= Sally Sloane =

- Sally Sloane at the 1955 Australian Folklore Festival (photograph from "People" magazine, 1956)

Background information
- Born: Eunice Evelyn Frost; 3 October 1894; Parkes, New South Wales, Australia
- Died: 20 September 1982 (aged 87) Wodonga, Victoria, Australia
- Genres: Folk music
- Occupations: Singer, instrumentalist
- Instruments: Button accordion, fiddle, mouth organ, jew's harp, tin whistle
- Years active: 1930s–1982
- Labels: Wattle, Larrikin, Carrawobitty Press, National Library of Australia

Sally Sloane (3 October 1894 – 20 September 1982) (birth name Eunice Evelyn Frost) was possibly the most important Australian "source musician" (carrier of Australian-Irish traditional music and song) to have been recorded during the Australian folk music revival of the 1950s and onwards; a number of her songs and tunes were passed down via her mother from her Irish grandmother, who emigrated to Australia in 1838. A resident of Lithgow, New South Wales and in her 60s at the time of her "discovery" by Australian folklorist John Meredith in 1954, she was an accomplished player of button accordion, fiddle and mouth organ as well as a singer. On a number of visits over the period 1954–1960, Meredith recorded over 150 items from her; these recordings are now in the collection of the National Library of Australia, and transcriptions of almost 40 of them were included, with accompanying notes, in his seminal 1967 book (with Hugh Anderson) "Folk Songs of Australia; And the Men and Women Who Sang Them". She was also visited and recorded by other collectors and at least one LP recording of her singing, "A Garland For Sally", was released, by Warren Fahey's Larrikin Records.

== Biography ==
Sally was born in 1894 at Parkes, New South Wales to Sarah and Tom Frost (a coach driver for Cobb and Co) and was christened Eunice Evelyn Frost. Together, Sally and her twin sister Bertha were the youngest of 10 children born to their parents over a fourteen-year period. It is not known when she began to be called "Sally", however the name is a diminutive of Sarah, which was the name of both her mother and grandmother.

Sally's maternal grandmother, Sarah Alexander, who died in 1889, was born in County Kerry in Ireland, (Note: 2 sources, which may have copied from each other (Low, 2003 and trove.nla.gov.au), state that Sally's grandmother was born in Belfast, which conflicts with the published statements of John Meredith (who undoubtedly knew Sally best) and others that Sally's grandmother came from County Kerry in the west of Ireland. In the absence of other evidence, it is presumed at this time that the statement by Meredith, etc. is correct and that the sources with conflicting information are in error.) and came to Australia by sailing ship with her brother when she was 22 years old. According to Sally's later conversations with John Meredith, her grandmother was a trained singer who knew many songs and dance tunes, many of which were later passed down to Sally via her daughter (Sally's mother), and entertained the passengers on her voyage out during concert parties. After her arrival in Australia, Sarah Alexander married a man called Dick Burrowes, and after his death, Charles Dean; her first daughter, also called Sarah (Sally's mother) initially married Tom Frost, Sally's father as described above, before divorcing him to take up residence with William Clegg, an itinerant railway construction worker and former gold miner. Sally and her twin sister, Bertha, travelled with their mother and new stepfather around the railway camps, adopting the surname of Clegg which they used on subsequent official documents. While travelling with her mother and stepfather, Sally found she had the ability to learn songs and tunes easily and later said that, as well as from her mother, she learned songs from her stepfather and from others in Parkes, Aberdeen, Tambar Springs, and elsewhere. In 1911, aged 17, she married John Phillip Malycha, who by then went by the surname of Mountford, a 28 year old miner living at Ashley, near Moree, giving her name as Eunice Evelyn "Mary" Clegg. Sally (Eunice/"Mary") and John lived at a number of locations in New South Wales and had five children within the first six years of their marriage.

It is not recorded what eventually happened to this marriage but it was certainly over by 1947, by which time Sally had formed a new relationship and was included in the New South Wales electoral roll as living in Lithgow, as Eunice Sloane, with Frederick Cecil ("Fred") Sloane, a grinder. Fred and Sally never married (Note: Possibly, she never obtained a divorce from her first husband, which would preclude remarriage while her legal husband was alive; one genealogy, citing the end of that marriage, says "deserted".) but presented themselves as husband and wife and remained together for over 35 years until Fred's death in 1980. The couple lived in Lithgow until 1956, when they moved first to Fennells Bay and then to Teralba, on the shore of Lake Macquarie, where Fred had work. In 1966, Fred's work there was complete and the couple returned to Lithgow, where they remained until Fred's death. Subsequently, Sally moved to Albury to stay with a niece, Jean, but unfortunately was victim of a tragic caravan fire on the property in which she was badly burned, and subsequently died from injuries sustained aged 87.

A reminiscence of Sally was included in an interview with her granddaughter, Cheryl Wotton (b. 1949), interviewed by Valda and Jim Low in 2001. A photograph with the caption "Sally Sloan presiding over a birthday party, Lithgow circa 1943", also including an image of her mother (known as "Granny Clegg"), was published in the Bush Music Club online archive in 2020.

== Musical activities, repertoire and style ==
Sally's mother Sarah was musical, playing concertina, button accordion, jew's harp and piano, and sang many songs from the repertoire of her own mother. Sally inherited her mother's love of music, playing the instruments favoured by her mother as well as becoming an accomplished player on the fiddle, mouth organ and tin whistle. While still a youngster she was already playing for bush dances and sang at local gatherings. Sally also mentioned (in an interview with Warren Fahey) appearing on stage at the Tivoli Theatre in Sydney on at least one occasion during the Second World War, playing for soldiers.

In late 1954 (Bush Music Cub archives) or early 1955 (McKenry book), John Meredith was performing in Lithgow with his pioneering "bush band" The Bushwhackers and as was his usual practice on the hunt for "bush singers", enquired whether there were any local singers he could visit. Fred Sloane was one of the organisers for the concert and told Meredith that his wife had a huge store of songs and tunes and could sing them "until the cows come home"; Meredith at first was inclined to disbelieve this but another of the group, Alan Scott was billeted with the Sloanes that weekend and confirmed the truth of Fred's assertion. Meredith lost no time in paying the Sloanes a visit on the next available occasion and returned numerous times, eventually recording over 150 items from her repertoire. A number of these were later released on the 1983 Larrikin Records LP, "A Garland For Sally", while a larger set of songs and tunes were included in Meredith and Hugh Anderson's 1967 publication "Folk Songs of Australia; And the Men and Women Who Sang Them." Meredith and the Sloanes enjoyed a close friendship, with Sally frequently contacting Meredith to tell him that she had remembered another song, or fragment thereof, with the result that Meredith visited the Sloanes on no less than 60 occasions; at one stage he was making the journey up to Lithgow (and later Teralba) every second month.

Meredith included Sally (as "Mrs. F. Sloane") as one of the "true Australian tradition-bearers" at the inaugural Australian Folklore Festival, staged in Sydney in September 1955. She was also (re-) recorded performing 8 items (songs and tunes) for a 1957 Wattle Records release Australian Traditional Singers and Musicians, along with other musicians originally recorded by Meredith including Duke Tritton, Herbert Gimbert and Edwin Goodwin - only the last using Meredith's original recording, since the singer had subsequently died. Reviewing this release in Midwest Folklore in 1959, the eminent U.S. folklorist Kenneth S. Goldstein wrote: "Mrs. Sloan [sic] is one of the great traditional singers of the world, certainly comparing favorably with the best to be offered in the English-speaking nations. And Mrs. Sloane's renditions on the button accordion and mouth organ are as delightful as her singing."

Sally was visited over the years by several other collectors including Warren Fahey and Graham Seal, Emily Lyle and Chris Sullivan, from the 1950s until the late 1970s. Former Bushwhacker and mouth organ player Harry Kay noted two Schottisches from her on a visit to him in Sydney in around 1968, while recordings made by Warren Fahey in 1976 are held in the National Library of Australia's Oral History and Folklore Collection.

Sally's performance style and repertoire, strongly influenced by the songs she learned orally, passed down by her Irish grandmother and mother, included original Irish ballads, English and Scottish traditional songs, bush ballads, and popular songs from the nineteenth and twentieth centuries that she learned from other musicians. Her Australian repertoire included such songs as "The Springtime it Brings on the Shearing", "The Wallaby Track", Henry Lawson's "Ballad of the Drover", "Click Go the Shears", and bushranger songs such as "The Death of Ben Hall" and "John Doolin", her version of "The Wild Colonial Boy"; it was songs like these (and bush instrumentals) that first attracted Meredith to Sally as an informant, however the survival of unique versions of Irish and British songs from the mid nineteenth century repertoire of her Irish grandmother can be viewed as equally if not more important from a folkloristic perspective.

Graeme Smith described her singing style in the following manner:

Distinctive and elegant as her melodies are, Sloane's singing style is the basis of her artistry. Her vocal production occasionally showed some use of a theatrical projection and vibrato, but in the main she used a steady pitch and a relatively direct narrative approach typical of vernacular traditional style. Within this vocal production she deployed a range of subtle vocal ornaments to emphasize both individual words and melodic points. Her most used ornament is an emphatic upper grace note, executed with a vocal break, often on an accented beat, but also deployed to hold the drama of other individual pitches, particularly in songs delivered at a slower tact, for example in 'The Springtime it Brings on the Shearing'. She uses portamento sparingly but nonetheless effectively.

John Meredith, in his introduction to "The Sally Sloane Songbook" (see below), wrote:

Rather amazingly Sally Sloane had two singing voices, which might conveniently be termed 'folk' and 'stage'. The first was used for all those lovely old Irish ballads Sal had inherited from her grandmother, through the medium of her mother, and this was a hard, clear, unemotional voice and style, very much in the Irish tradition. The other voice was reserved for those stage and art songs of probable music hall origins. It was a rich mezzo-soprano with a little vibrato and she used it for such songs as The Deep Shades of Blue, to give one example.

Thirty seven items from Sally's repertoire were published in print form, with notes and information regarding Sally's sources so far as was apparent, in 1967 as a major component of John Meredith and Hugh Anderson's "Folk Songs of Australia and the men and women who sang them" (Ure Smith, Sydney, refer Bibliography), with a selection from the same (seventeen items) republished posthumously as "The Sally Sloane Songbook" (Scott, 2004; for details see Bibliography). A listing of c. 144 items (songs and tunes) collected by John Meredith from Sally is given as an "extra" to the account of her life prepared by Valda Low, a more detailed list (with links) of tunes only was prepared by Ian Hayden in 2016, while Warren Fahey has put online a separate list of items of Sally's that he recorded.

She was made one of the earliest life members of the Sydney Bush Music Club, formed in 1954, and performed there on numerous occasions.

== Bibliography ==
- Meredith, John & Anderson, Hugh (1967). Folk Songs of Australia; And the Men and Women Who Sang Them, Volume 1. Ure Smith, Sydney, 300 pp. Pages 161-198 of this book are devoted to Sally and selections (with words and music) from her repertoire, namely "The Red Rose Top" (aka "The Sprig of Thyme"); "Ben Hall"; "The Banks of Claudy"; "The Maid of Fainey"; "The Wee One"; "The Cherry Tree"; "If I Was a Blackbird"; "The Girls of the Shamrock Shore"; "Lovely Molly"; "The Green Bushes"; "The Rambling Sailor"; "The Girl with the Flowing Hair"; "I've Been a Wild Boy"; "My Bonny Love Is Young"; "Lovely Nancy"; "The Lowlands of Holland"; "The Coolgardie Miner"; "Varsovienna" (tune); "Coming Down the Mountain" (tune); "Jack's Waltz" (tune); "Annie Shaw's Tune" (tune); "Mum's Mazurka" (tune); "John Doolan"; "The Wallaby Track"; "The Springtime It Brings On The Shearing"; "I Think By This Time He's Forgot Her"; "The Journeyman Tailor"; "Christ Was Born In Bethlehem"; "The Warrego Lament"; "Ballad of the Drover"; "The Black Velvet Band"; "The Shoemaker's Son"; "Click Go the Shears"; "Gargal Machree"; "The Knickerbocker Line"; "Molly Baun Lavery"; "My Son Ted" (some with incomplete verses).
- Meredith, John (1981). "Three songs of Sally Sloane". Stringybark & Greenhide vol. 3 no. 1: 7-9. Songs are "Young Pat McGuire", "The Maid of Sweet Gauteen", and "Squire Scoble or The Old Oak Tree".
- Anonymous (1982). "The Sweet Song is Stilled... Sally Sloane, Born 1894, Died 1982". Mulga Wire No 34: Dec 1982 page image
- "Review: A Garland For Sally (Larrikin, LRF136, 1983)". Stringybark & Greenhide vol. 5 no. 2 (1984)
- "Sally Sloane revels in the traditional" - review of A Garland For Sally. The Sydney Morning Herald, Monday, March 26, 1984, p. 53.
- Seal, Graham (2003). "Sally Sloane: a river of tradition". In Seal, Graham & Willis, Rob: Verandah Music: Roots of Australian Tradition. Curtin University Books/Fremantle Arts Centre Press.
- Scott, Gay (ed.) (2004) The Sally Sloane Songbook: Australian traditional singer. Sydney Bush Music Club Incorporated, Sydney. Songs included are The Wee One; My Bonny Love is Young; The Banks of Claudy; I've Been a Wild Boy; The Maid of Fainey; The Green Bushes; The Journeyman Tailor; I Think By This Time He's Forgot Her; The Cherry Tree; Adieu My Lovely Nancy; The Springtime It Brings On the Shearing; Molly Baun Lavery; The Sprig of Thyme; Ben Hall; If I was a blackbird; My Son Ted; Christ was Born in Bethlehem.

== Discography ==
=== Sally Sloane ===
- A Garland For Sally. Larrikin Records LRF 136, 1983 (1950s field recordings by John Meredith). Tracks: Break Up; Death Of Ben Hall; Banks Of Claudy; Varsovienna/Mountain Bell Schottische/Annie Shaw's Tune; The Red Barn/The Girls Of The Shamrock Shore; I've Been A Wild Boy; Molly Baun; Green Bushes; Mum'a Mazurka/Set Tune/Boys Of The Dardenelles; Young Pat Maguire; My Pretty Little Maid; Rambling Sailor; First Set Tune.

=== On other releases ===
- Various artists: Australian Traditional Singers and Musicians, Wattle, C7, 1957, Archive Series No. 1. (10-inch LP). Sally's music occupies all of Side 1 and the first and last tracks of Side 2, accompanying herself on button accordion (most tracks) and playing mouth organ on A6. Tracks: Martin O'Flynn; Ben Hall; The Quaker's Wife; The Wee One; Christ Was Born In Bethlehem; Miss McLeod's Reel; The Blackberry Blossom; Flowers Of Edinburgh.
- Various artists: Folk Songs of Australia (2 x cassettes), Carrawobitty Press, WON 595-1 and 595-2, 1995; re-released on 2 compact discs as Sharing the Harvest: Field Recordings from the Meredith Collection in the National Library of Australia. National Library of Australia, Canberra, 2001. Sally Sloane tracks: Annie Shaw's Tune; The Black Velvet Band; Christ Was Born in Bethlehem; Coming Down the Mountain; Jack's Waltz; John Doolan; The Knickerbocker Line; Mum's Mazurka; My Son Ted; The Rambling Sailor; The Springtime It Brings On the Shearing; Varsovienna; The Warrego Lament.
- included on the CD accompanying Keith McKenry's 2014 book "More Than a Life: John Meredith and the Fight for Australian Tradition", CD reference Fanged Wombat Productions FWD 011. Includes 1 track of Sally performing "Christ was Born in Bethlehem", from the original Meredith field recording, a different recording from that used for Australian Traditional Singers and Musicians.
