= John Meredith (folklorist) =

Australian folk singer and folklore collector (1920–2001)

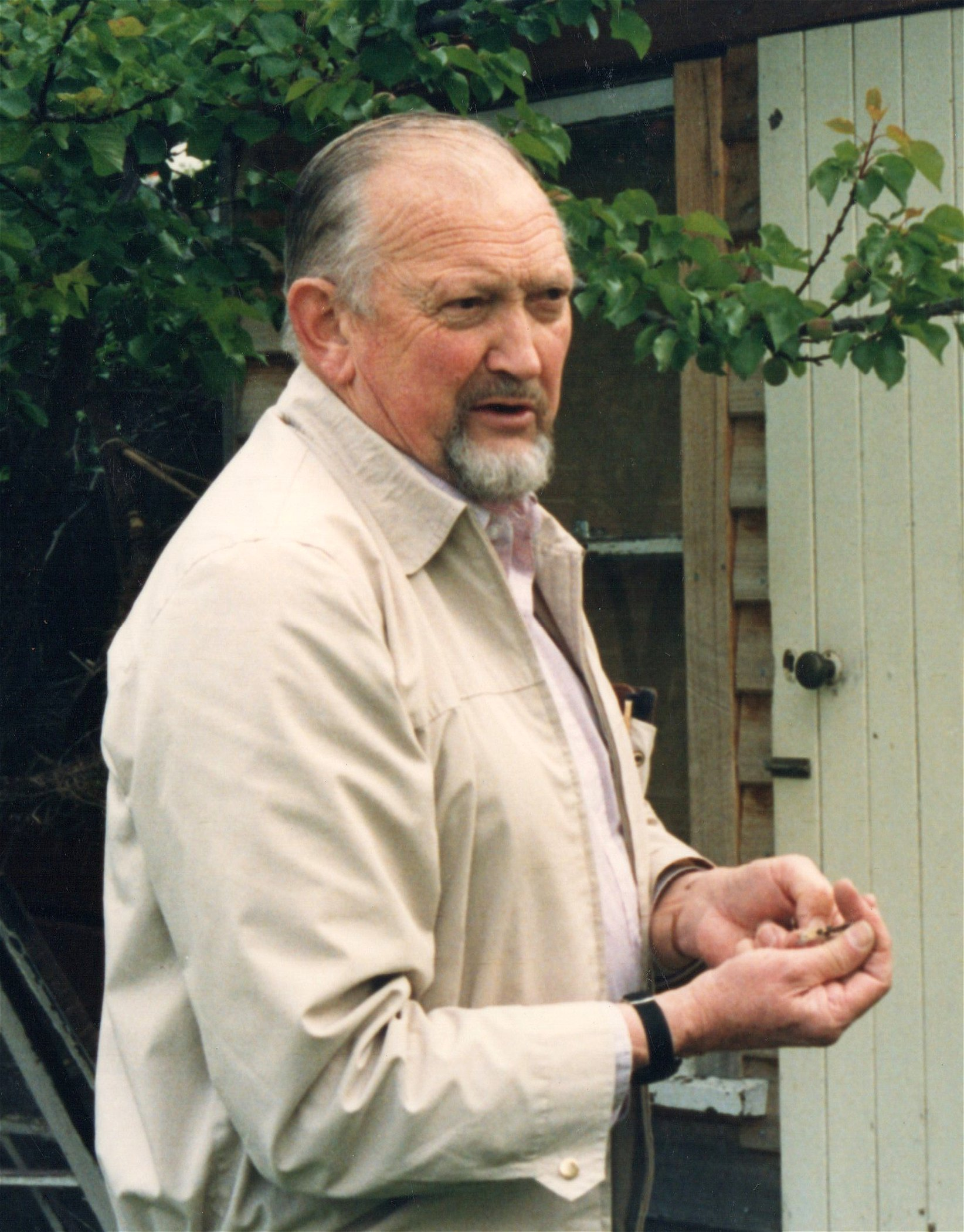
Meredith in 1987

John Stanley Raymond Meredith OAM (17 January 1920 – 18 February 2001) was an Australian pioneer folklorist from Holbrook, New South Wales whose work influenced the Australian folk music revival of the 1950s, in particular as a founding member of the Australia's first revivalist bush band The Bushwhackers (unrelated to the contemporary band of similar name). He was awarded the Medal of the Order of Australia in 1986 for service to Australian folklore and music, and became a Member of the Order of Australia in 1992 for service to the Arts, particularly in the collection and preservation of Australian folklore.

== Career ==
=== Early life ===
A pioneer collector of Australian folk music and song, John Meredith was born in Holbrook, New South Wales, to Bert and Ellen Meredith. Bert played the button (bush) accordion, often playing dance tunes for his family after dinner. Bert Meredith worked as a drover along the Darling and Murrumbidgee rivers in New South Wales and was often away. His father played the button accordion, an old and much patched Mezon Grand Organ model he probably learned to play whilst away droving and when he was at home he played the popular songs and dances of the Bush. He also played the mouth organ, using a tin pannikin as a resonator or playing the bones as he played on mouth organ. He died when John was only nine years old, but many of his tunes stayed in John's mind.

Ellen looked after John and six more on a small block in Holbrook and he remembers that she sang a little as she worked and she entertained the kids with readings from Australian books and magazines such as The Bulletin. Meredith took up the button accordion and at the age of fourteen, when Ellen promised him a brand new "Melba" model if he learnt how to play on his father's old and patched Mezon. He learned to play from the locals as well as learning some tunes from the gramophone. At seventeen or eighteen he began to assist with the playing at local dances and later would play for the entire evening if no other musician was available.

Meredith was educated at Holbrook Public School until the age of fourteen but was unable to complete the Intermediate Certificate as the family did not have the means to purchase the required school books. He developed an interest in Australian bush songs when he bought a copy of Banjo Paterson's Old Bush Songs. At the same time, he discovered photography. These three discoveries, music, bush songs and photographs were to become Meredith's lifetime passions.

He continued to develop his skills as a photographer and musician whilst working in Holbrook at a pharmacy. In 1944 Meredith moved to Melbourne and three years later decided to travel the east coast of Australia on his pushbike, picking up work where he could. During this time, Meredith travelled from Melbourne to Cairns and eventually settled in Sydney. In Sydney, Meredith joined the Eureka Youth League, the Communist Party, and the People's Choir. It was at this time that he began to seek out traditional Australian songs to include in the choir's repertoire.

In 1952 he was introduced to Jack Lee, an old man known as "Hoop-iron". "Hoop-iron" knew many of the old bush songs Meredith had been trying to find and Meredith started to record them. He soon discovered that he had uncovered an entire network of old singers and musicians who knew material that was assumed to have been lost from Australian culture. Meredith's long career as a folklore collector began.

In 1954 Meredith became the secretary of the newly formed Australian Folklore Society and also assisted in the formation of the Bush Music Club in Sydney. During this time he spent every available weekend travelling throughout NSW collecting songs and dance tunes from some of Australia's finest traditional singers. In 1960 Meredith was the recipient of an Australian Literature Fund Grant for £500 (equivalent to A$15,200 in 2020) to publish a book based on his field work and recordings. He suffered a heart attack at this time and the book, Folk Songs of Australia, co-written by Hugh Anderson, did not appear until 1967. For the next ten years, Meredith continued to write about his work and published many more books about folk life in Australia.

=== The Bushwhackers and Reedy River ===
In 1952, Meredith formed the first Australian revivalist bush band with Jack Barrie and Brian Loughlin (misspelled Loughlan in some sources). Originally known as The Heathcote Bushwhackers, they were later simply known as The Bushwhackers. Meredith had begun to collect and record bush music and songs and the band aimed to perform this new repertoire to promote the folk music traditions of rural Australia. The band were unique in the folk revival of that time in that they performed with traditional bush instruments. Meredith played the button (or bush) accordion or squeezebox, and the tin whistle. Barrie played the bush bass or tea chest bass and Loughlin played the lagerphone, also known as the Murrumbidgee River Rattler. Late in 1952 they gave their first performance at the Rivoli Hall in Hurstville. It was at this time that the name of the band was permanently changed to The Bushwhackers.

In December 1953 the band performed in the Sydney New Theatre amateur production of Reedy River, an Australian musical play written by Dick Diamond featuring bush and Australian folk music, some of which had been collected by Meredith. The success of Reedy River primarily inspired the Australian folk music revival of the 1950s. During that period, membership of the Bushwhackers expanded to include a number of the cast of the musical as well as others, eventually including Harry Kay, Alex (Alec) Hood, Cedric Grivas, Alan Scott and Chris Kempster. In 1954 Meredith was one of the founding members of the first club set up to cater to this interest, the Bush Music Club of Sydney.

The Bushwhackers disbanded in 1957. Various of its members continued to perform in bush bands such as "The Rambleers" and "The Galahs", while Meredith continued to collect field recordings of Australian traditional and folk music, as well as performing with "The Shearers" and the Bush Music Club's "Concert Party".

=== Later life ===
In 1981 Meredith re-discovered his love for collecting and photographing Australian bush singers and musicians, which he continued to do until his health failed him. The Meredith Collection is housed at the National Library of Australia and contains nearly 8,000 catalogued items including photos and material collected from over 700 performers. This included unpublished manuscripts such as 'Will Ogilvie – the Scottish jackaroo'.

In 2001, Meredith passed away in Albury, New South Wales. He never married. Meredith's biography More than a Life: John Meredith and the Fight for Australian Tradition was written by Keith McKenry and released in 2014.

=== Original works ===
Meredith also wrote unpublished ballad opera and rock opera. He wrote several plays, including The Wild Colonial Boy with Joan Clarke, first produced by Brisbane New Theatre in 1955, and How Many Miles from Gundagai performed by the Bushwhackers.

=== Song collecting ===
Some of the songs and music featured in the production of Reedy River had been collected by Meredith himself. He collected a wide variety of folk music, including Sally Sloane, a traditional singer with a large repertoire of songs many of which had not been collected previously. Meredith also collected songs by Duke Tritton, a poet and songwriter whose work reflected his experiences as a shearer and as an unemployed itinerant worker during the Great Depression. Both song books and non-fiction works on the folklore of Australia were published by Meredith over the course of his career.

Meredith continued to collect field recordings of traditional songs and music throughout his life. His recordings are housed in the Meredith Collection at the National Library of Australia.

== Publications ==
=== Books ===
- Bushwhacker Songs: Old and New Sydney: John Meredith, ca.1955
- Songs From Lawson By Henry Lawson, edited by John Meredith. Woolloomooloo, NSW: Bush Music Club, 1956, 1957
- Reedy River: The Songs from the Australian Musical Drama By Dick Diamond. Sydney: New Theatre, 1960
- The Wild Colonial Boy: The Life and Times of Jack Donahoe 1808(?)-1830 Sydney, NSW: Wentworth Press, 1960
- Folk Songs of Australia and the Men and Women Who Sang Them By John Meredith and Hugh Anderson. Sydney: Ure Smith, ca.1967, 1968, 1973
- Folk Songs of Australia and the Men and Women Who Sang Them By John Meredith and Hugh Anderson. Dee Why West, NSW: Ure Smith, 1979
- Frank, The Poet: The Life and Works of Francis MacNamara By John Meredith and Rex Whalan. Melbourne: Red Rooster, 1979
- Ned Kelly After A Century of Acrimony By John Meredith and Bill Scott. Sydney: Lansdowne Press, 1980
- The Coo-ee March: Gilgandra-Sydney 1915 Dubbo, NSW: Macquarie Publications, 1981
- The Donahoe Ballads Ascot Vale, Vic.: Red Rooster Press, ca.1982
- The Wild Colonial Boy: Bushranger Jack Donahoe, 1806–1830 Ascot Vale, Vic.: Red Rooster Press, 1982
- Duke of the Outback: The Adventures of "A Shearer Named Tritton" Vale, Vic.: Red Rooster Press, 1983
- Learn To Talk Old Jack Lang: A Handbook of Australian Rhyming Slang By John Meredith, drawings by George Sprod. Kenthurst, NSW: Kangaroo Press, 1984
- Folk Songs of Australia and the Men and Women Who Sang Them By John Meredith and Hugh Anderson. Kensington, NSW: New South Wales University Press, 1985–1987
- The Householders' Compendium Shepparton, Vic.: Night Owl, 1986
- The Coo-ee March: Gilgandra-Sydney, 1915 Kenthurst, NSW: Kangaroo Press, 1986
- King of the Dance Hall: The Story of Fifty Years of Ballroom Music with Frank Bourke and the White Rose Orchestra Kenthurst, NSW: Kangaroo Press, c1986
- Folk Songs of Australia and the Men and Women Who Sang Them: Volume 2 By John Meredith, Roger Covell and Patricia Brown. Kensington, NSW: New South Wales University Press, 1987
- Gallant Peter Clark Woden, A.C.T.: Popinjay, 1988
- The Last Kooradgie: Moyengully, Chief Man of the Gundungurra People Kenthurst, NSW: Kangaroo Press, 1989
- Breaker's Mate : Will Ogilvie in Australia, of Scottish-Australian poet and bush balladeer Will H. Ogilvie (1869–1963), compiled and edited by John Meredith. Kenthurst, NSW: Kangaroo Press, ca.1996

=== Other works ===
Meredith also authored a large number of magazine articles (full list unavailable) plus numerous original photographs, audio recordings and some film segments. A list of over 1,000 items deposited at the National Library of Australia with author = "Meredith, John, 1920-2001" can be generated here. Several of his film clips have been since made available by the National Library of Australia/National Film and Sound Archive of Australia via YouTube (see "External Links").
