= Dobe Newton =

Australian musician

Dobe Newton OAM
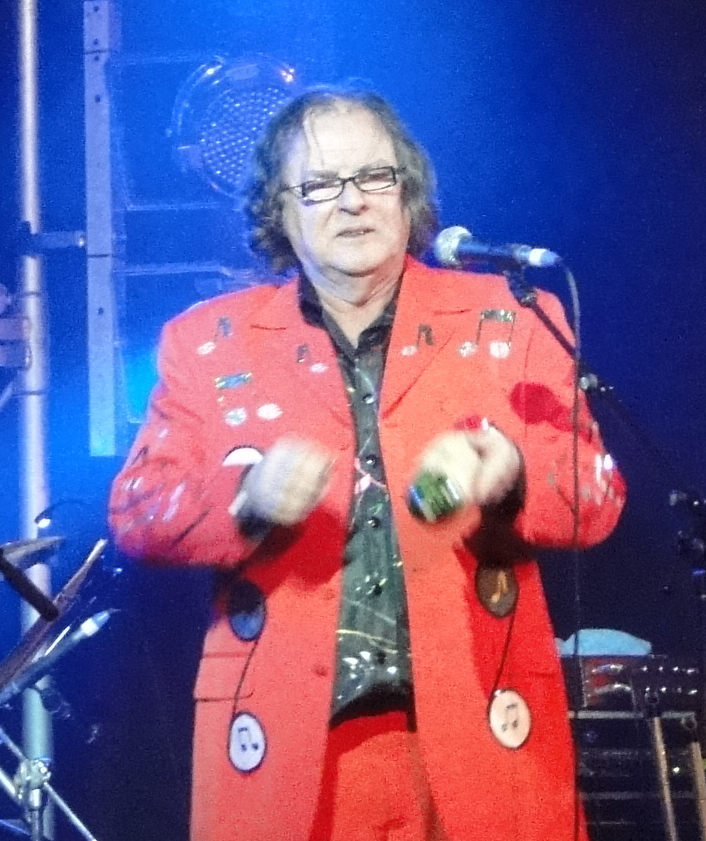
- Performing with the Bushwackers, National Celtic Festival, Portarlington, Victoria, 2010.

Background information
- Born: 14 July 1948 (age 78); Sydney, New South Wales, Australia
- Genres: Bush band; folk; Australian country
- Occupations: Musician; teacher; CEO
- Instruments: Vocals; lagerphone; tin whistle
- Years active: 1973–present
- Member of: The Bushwackers

Dobe Newton OAM (born 14 July 1948) is an Australian musician and member of folk and country music group the Bushwackers from 1973. He co-wrote the patriotic song "I Am Australian" in 1987 with Bruce Woodley. For his service to the performing arts as an entertainer and advocate he was appointed to the Order of Australia in 2013.

== Career ==
Dobe Newton was born on 14 July 1948 in Sydney. During the 1960s he acquired a lagerphone and tin whistle after hearing Irish folk group the Dubliners. He joined Australian bush band the Bushwackers (initially the Original Bushwhackers and Bullockies Bush Band) in 1973 on vocals and lagerphone. As the group's longest-serving member he became their leader during the 1980s. In 1987 he co-wrote "I Am Australian" with Bruce Woodley of the Seekers.

Outside of performing Newton ran workshops and seminars on music in both Western Australia and Victoria. He was the CEO of the Western Australian Music Industry Association in the 1990s, before he relocated to Victoria where took a similar role at the Victorian Rock Foundation. For 18 years he was a member of teaching staff at North Melbourne Institute of TAFE (Technical and Further Education) running a course on Music Business.

In 2013 he also became President of Country Music Association of Australia (CMAA) replacing John Williamson. As of March 2022 he still held that position.

He was awarded an Order of Australia Medal on Australia Day, 2013 for "service to the performing arts as an entertainer and advocate." Along with fellow Bushwacker Roger Corbett, Newton was added to the Australasian Country Music Roll of Renown in 2021.

In August 2023, Newton performed a rendition of his song "I Am Australian", alongside fellow Bushwacker Roger Corbett, in their audition on the twelfth season of The Voice Australia, in which they received a four-chair turn before securing a place on coach Jessica Mauboy's team.
