= Bush Music Club =

Bush Music Club Inc.
- Formation: 1954; 72 years ago
- Type: Nonprofit organization
- Purpose: Promotion of Australian folk music and folk dance; publishing of folk music related materials, including "Singabout" magazine (1956-1967) and "Mulga Wire" (1977-current).
- Headquarters: Sydney, Australia
- Region served: Australia
- Website: http://www.bushmusic.org.au/

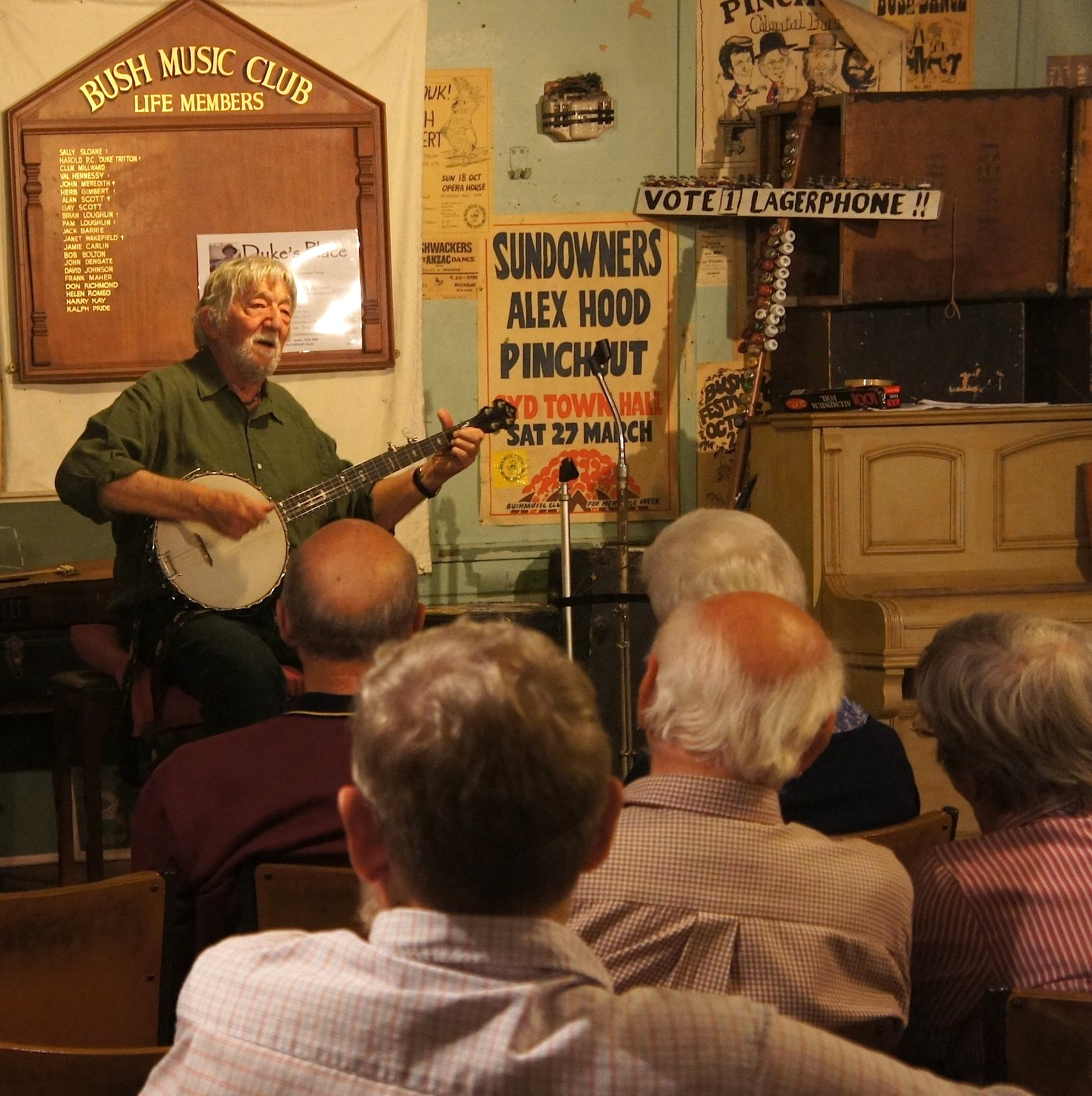
Original Bushwhacker Alex Hood, age 19 when the Club opened in 1954, performs at the Bush Music Club in 2014, in his 79th year.

Sydney's Bush Music Club is the oldest and longest running folk music performance and education organisation in Australia, and is believed to be the second oldest such club still in existence in the English speaking world. Founded in 1954, and still extant as at 2022, it exists to further "the collection and research of folklore traditions and folk music and to encourage the performance of traditional bush music, song and dance, spoken word, bush poetry and yarns". It hosts regular events and has published a range of folklore related materials, including the magazine "Singabout" from 1956 to 1967, which continues as a section within a subsequent publication "Mulga Wire" (1977-current).

== History ==
The club was founded in October 1954 by the Australian folklorist and performer John Meredith, together with colleagues from Australia's first revivalist "bush band" The Bushwhackers, as a social and teaching club with the aim of popularising the style of bush singing and dancing promoted by the band and encouraging others to form their own performing groups; the band would participate by teaching up-and-coming members songs and giving them instruction on playing bush instruments. An announcement of the proposed formation of the club, in the form of a leaflet available to interested parties, ran as follows:

THE BUSH MUSIC CLUB

We have been approached by many singers and instrumentalists who wished to join the "Bushwhackers", but we consider that the optimum number for an ensemble such as ours is six. We have been refusing engagements at the rate of three or four a week for several months, not because we want to, but simply for the reasons that we need time to rehearse, we have to work for our living and because we have to get some sleep occasionally.

We don’t like disappointing people so we have decided to form a club, where in return for a nominal membership fee we will give away our secrets. The "Bushwhackers" will help you to learn the accordeon, harmonica, bones, bush bass, lager phone and lots more. We will provide the words and music of our songs and show you how we sing them.

The inaugural meeting and first rehearsal of the BUSH MUSIC CLUB will take place at the Realist Theatrette, 1st Floor, 188 George Street, on Thursday October 14th, at 7 p.m. sharp.

Further details may be had from John Meredith, 5 Henry Street, Lewisham, or from any of the "Bushwhackers".

Initial office bearers (all members of the original Bushwhackers band) were Brian Loughlin as chair, Alan Scott as secretary/treasurer, Harry Kay as master of ceremonies and Meredith as "publicity officer" and future editor of the club's planned publications.

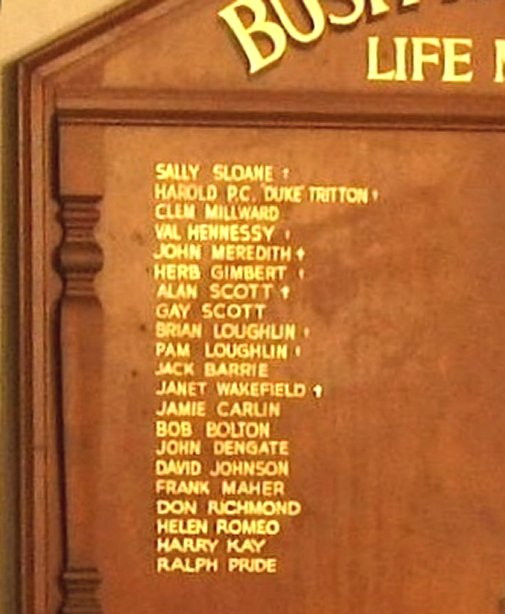
List of Life Members of the Bush Music Club as at 2014 (detail of Alex Hood photograph above)

With Meredith's interest in collecting Australian folksongs, the club's journal "Singabout" was started in 1956 as a route to publish and promote a selection of these songs for singing by others, in addition to being an outlet for newly composed songs on Australian themes. (A Club newsletter, also including song transcriptions, etc., had already started in 1955). While Meredith and his colleagues had Australian Communist Party affiliations, in reality this manifested itself as a general predisposition to sympathy to the concerns of the Australian working class and not to specific furtherance of official Communist Party objectives, although the American folklorist John Greenway, reviewing "Singabout" in 1958, lamented that "folksong collecting and publishing [in Australia] today is in the hands of the Communists". (Note: Such a connection was not, of course, without precedent: both the British Workers' Music Association and the U.S. People's Songs had similar interests, that is, the overt use of songs as a vehicle for social change, allied strongly with the labour movement) Meredith's involvement as an office bearer with the club lasted until at least 1968, where he is listed as assistant editor, having previously been president for 1961 and vice president for 1966.

Life members included the Australian traditional singers Sally Sloane and Duke Tritton; the latter assisted Meredith with his song collecting and also served as club vice president for several terms. Other persons awarded life membership included founder members and original Bushwhackers John Meredith, Jack Barrie, Alan Scott, Brian Loughlin and Harry Kay, resident topical/humorous songwriter John Dengate, and more (refer board illustrated at right).

A selection of performers from the club, including Meredith and several other of the original Bushwhackers in the early years, performed at festivals and public gatherings as the "Bush Music Club Concert Party" and made a number of appearances on record between the mid 1950s and 1960s (see "Recordings" section); for David Jones "Wool Week" in 1959 they also appeared as "The Shearer's Band". Members of these bands, who tended to vary, were amateur performers who performed for the love of the music, with proceeds of performances going back to support the club and its other activities. From the 1970s and onwards, many performers who had received their "apprenticeships" with the Concert Party went on to form bands of their own, examples being "The Rouseabouts", "Ryebuck", "Pinchgut", "Selectors", "Southern Cross", "Sydney Coves", "Currawong" and "Barangaroo".

The club rode out the downturn in popular interest in folk music in the 1980s and 1990s; a 1987 review noted that the club at that time had over 400 members. In 2014 the club celebrated its 60th birthday with a series of concerts, new publications and festival performances, and in 2020 was still offering a regular program of bush dances, dance and music workshops, and Irish traditional music, singing, and poetry sessions at a range of Sydney venues.

== Influence ==
Similar clubs began to appear in the other Australian States, notably the Victorian Bush Music Club (established 1959) and the Queensland Bush Music Club (also the Queensland Federation of Bush Music groups). Especially in its early years, the club acted as a catalyst for the formation of "bush bands" in other Australian cities and towns, while its Concert Party trained a number of musicians who subsequently went on to form their own bands in the 1970s and beyond (see above).

== Publications ==
[preliminary listing, probably some missed]

- 1954-1956 Bushwacker Broadsides: 1) The Old Man. Kangaroo; (2) The Old Bark Hut; (3) Jim Jones at Botany Bay; 4) The Rabbiter's Song; (5) Ho, Give a Fair Go; (6) Hungry Jim the Miner; 7) Wally the Weatherman; (8) The Black Velvet Band; (9) The Bold Kelly Gang; 10) Bound for Darling Harbour; (11) Farewell to Greta; (12) Kelly was their Captain; (13) The Kellys, Byrne and Hart; (14) Stringybark Creek; (15) Ye Sons of Australia; (16) ??
- 1955 John Meredith: Six authentic Songs from the Kelly Country
- 1956 onwards: "Singabout" Magazine (ceased 1967)
- 1956 John Meredith (editor): Songs from Lawson
- 1968 John Meredith, Alan Scott & Eric Bolton (editors): Singabout songster. Number 1
- 1970 Alan Scott: A collector's song book: words and music of thirty-one traditional songs collected in Australia
- 1970 R. D. Dengate and J. Carlin (editors): Songs of the shearer
- 1977-current "Mulga Wire" Magazine
- 1979 Bush Music Club: Six new dances, composed for the Bush Music Club's Silver Jubilee
- 1982 John Dengate: My shout!: songs and poems (reprinted 2012)
- 1984 David Johnson: Bush dance: a collection of traditional tunes arranged in sets for bush bands
- 1985 Bob Bolton (editor): Singabout, selected reprints from Singabout, journal of Australian folksong, 1956-1967: an anthology
- 1986 Lance Green: Bush dance: instructions
- 2004 Scott, Gay (editor) The Sally Sloane Songbook: Australian traditional singer
- 2007 Mike Waters: One hundred Dances
- 2010 Australian Railway Songs
- 2012 John Dengate: Songs, Poems, Satire and Shouts all the way
- 2013 Helen Romeo (compiler): Family bush dance: instructions for simple bush dances, suitable for children & family groups

== Recordings ==
The following list of recordings by the Bush Music Club Concert Party (aka "The Shearer's Band") was put together by Bob Bolton in 1983 (dates added for this article):

- 1959: Bush Music Club: Songs from the Shearing Sheds. Festival FL-7116; Calendar R66-433. Reissued as Bush Ballads, Festival FL3I-336
- 1959: The Shearer's Band: Harmony (Waltzing Matilda/Nine Miles From Gundagai/Botany Bay/Click Go The Shears). Issued by David Jones for "Wool Week", 1959.
- 1964: Dinki! Di! We (do) love singing Fair Dinkum Aussie Songs / (The Best): 10th Anniversary Album. Festival FL31'526 / Calendar R66l96 (Title depends on which side of the jacket you read!)
- 1966?: Poems in Music, Henry Lawson Poems set to music by the Bush Music Club. Festival: Mono; FL32—282; Stereo, SFL932-282 Calendar R66-587 (Stereo) SR66-9,587
- 1969: Songs And Poems of Australia (with various other artists). Calendar R66-577
- 1974: True Blue Songs of the Outback. Festival L4552314 (repackaging of Songs From The Shearing Shed & Dinki Di!, as double LP)
- 1980: 20 Golden Hits. Festival L-25365 (re-mastering of twenty tracks from earlier B.M.C. LPs)
- The Bush Music Club (7" 45 rpm). Festival FX 10-163
- 16,000 miles from Home. Festival FX 10-459
- Nine Miles from Gundagai. Festival FX 100-464 (contains previously issued material)

== Bibliography ==
- McKenry, Keith, 2014. More Than a Life: John Meredith and the Fight for Australian Tradition. Rosenberg Publishing, 488 pp. ISBN 9781925078145
