= Franklyn B Paverty =

- Origin: Australia
- Years active: 1970-present
- Labels: Larrikin Records
- Website: http://paverty.com.au

Franklyn B Paverty is an Australian bush band that has performed mostly in and around Canberra. Its repertoire primarily comprises Australian folk music, bush ballads and music for bush dances, varied occasionally with material from the celtic, bluegrass and old-time traditions.

== Origins and History ==
Formed by a group of ANU students in the early 1970s, the band first performed in Queanbeyan in 1974. It was first known as Franklyn B Paverty and the Platte Valley Crooners, as, writes Ben Hope, "as a tongue-in-cheek dedication to the jazz musician by the same name".

The band's name was subsequently shortened to Franklyn B Paverty, then to Paverty Bush Band, Paverty or the Pavs.

The band has made numerous albums, TV appearances and radio broadcasts and it played for the official opening of Australia's new Parliament House, Canberra in 1988; and again at celebrations marking the 10th anniversary in 1998, the 20th anniversary in 2008 and the 25th anniversary in 2013.

It has also shared the stage with Billy Connolly, The Dubliners, The Hollies, Gerry and the Pacemakers, Slim Dusty and Eric Bogle.

Band members over its history included Dave Chalker, Graham Chalker, Bryan Rae, Mal Bennett, Tom Breen, Mark Tandy, Ros Haskew, Fiona Mahoney, Dave O'Neill, Donal Baylor, Frank and Bernie Nizynski, Mike Jackson, John Warner, Bob Buckley, Peter Hobson, Peter Logue, Simone Dawson, Mary Firkins and John Taylor.

== Discography ==
=== Studio albums ===
List of albums, with selected chart positions
Title	Album details	Peak chart positions
Title	Album details	AUS
Paverty Stricken	Released: 1976; Format: LP; Label: Franklyn B. Paverty	-
1891	Released: 1980; Format: LP, Cassette; Label: EMI Custom Records (PRX-1668)	80
Songs of the Australian Goldrush	Released: 1987; Format: LP, Cassette; Label: Larrikin Records (LRF 173)	-
Convict Songs of Australia	Released: 1988; Format: LP, CD, Cassette; Label: Larrikin Records (LRF 222)	-
With My Swag On My Shoulder	Released: 2006; Format: CD; Label: Franklyn B Paverty	-
Trip to Trundle	Released: 2007; Format: CD; Label: Franklyn B Paverty	-
Singing Land	Released: Format: CD; Label: Franklyn B Paverty	-

== See also ==
- And the Band Played Waltzing Matilda
