= Jim Jones at Botany Bay =

Australian folk ballad

"Jim Jones at Botany Bay" (Roud 5478) is a traditional Australian folk ballad dating from the early 19th-century. The narrator, Jim Jones, is found guilty of poaching and sentenced to transportation to the penal colony of New South Wales. En route, his ship is attacked by pirates, but the crew holds them off. When the narrator remarks that he would rather have joined the pirates or indeed drowned at sea than gone to Botany Bay, Jones is reminded by his captors that any mischief will be met with the whip. In the final verse, Jones describes the daily drudgery and degradation of life as a convict in Australia, and dreams of joining the bushrangers (escaped convicts turned outlaws) and taking revenge on his floggers.

Australian folklorists such as Bill Scott date the song's composition to the years immediately preceding 1830 when bushranger Jack Donahue, who is named in the song, was fatally shot by troopers. The oldest surviving written version of the ballad is found in Old Pioneering Days in the Sunny South (1907), a book of reminiscences by Charles McAlister, a pioneer who drove bullock teams in southern-eastern New South Wales in the 1840s. According to folklorist A. L. Lloyd, "Jim Jones at Botany Bay" may have been lost to history had McAlister not included it in his book.

McAlister said "Jim Jones at Botany Bay" was sung to the tune of "Irish Molly O". Others consider it likely that it was sung to the tune of the Irish rebel song "Skibbereen".

== Lyrics ==
One version of the traditional lyrics is shown below:

Come gather round and listen lads, and hear me tell m' tale
How across the sea from England I was condemned to sail
The jury says, "He's guilty sir", and then says the judge, says he:
"Oh for life, Jim Jones, I'm sending you across the stormy sea
But take a tip before you ship to join the iron gang
Don't be too gay in Botany Bay, or else you'll surely hang
Or else you'll surely hang", says he, "and after that, Jim Jones
High upon the gallows tree the crows will pick your bones
There's no time for mischief there, remember that Jim Jones
Oh they'll flog the poaching out of you down there in Botany Bay"

The wind blew high upon the sea and some pirates come along
But the soldiers in our convict ship, they were a hundred strong
They opened fire and somehow drove that pirate ship away
I'd rather have joined that pirate ship than come to Botany Bay

Now night and day our irons clang and like poor galley-slaves
We toil and strive and when we die, we fill dishonoured graves
But by and by I'll break my chains and to the bush I'll go
And join the brave bushrangers there like Donahue and Co.
And some dark night when everything is quiet in the town,
I'll kill the tyrants one and all, I'll shoot the floggers down
I'll give the law a little shock, remember what I say
And they'll yet regret they sent Jim Jones and in chains to Botany Bay.

== Recordings ==
- Ewan MacColl, "Jim Jones at Botany Bay" (on "Convicts and Currency Lads" 1957)
- Marian Henderson, "Jim Jones of Botany Bay" (PIX magazine EP, 1964)
- Gary Shearston, "Jim Jones at Botany Bay" (on "Folk Songs and Ballads of Australia" 1964)
- A. L. Lloyd, "Jim Jones at Botany Bay" (on "The Great Australian Legend" 1971)
- Bushwhackers and Bullockies Bush Band ("Bushwackers Band"), "Jim Jones at Botany Bay" (on "The Shearer's Dream", Picture Records 1974. Tune by Mick Slocum as recorded by Bob Dylan 1992; Martin Carthy 1999)
- Bob Dylan, "Jim Jones" (on Good as I Been to You, 1992)
- Martin Carthy, "Jim Jones in Botany Bay" (on Signs of Life, 1999)
- Mick Thomas and the Sure Thing, "Jim Jones at Botany Bay" (on Dead Set Certainty, 1999)
- Martyn Wyndham-Reed, "Jim Jones at Botany Bay" (on Undiscovered Australia, 19xx)
- The Currency, "Jim Jones" (on "888", 2008)
- Mawkin:Causley, "Botany Bay" (on Cold Ruin, 2008)
- Chloe and Jason Roweth, "Jim Jones at Botany Bay" (on Battler's Ballad, Live at Humph Hall, 2012)
- Jennifer Jason Leigh, "Jim Jones at Botany Bay" (on The Hateful Eight soundtrack, 2015)
- Bill and Joel Plaskett, "Jim Jones" (on Solidarity, 2017)
- Brodie Buttons, "Jim Jones of Botany Bay" (on Sit Back and Endure, 2019)

== In popular culture ==
- In the computer strategy game Sid Meier's Alpha Centauri, the last part of the ballad is used upon faction selection to describe the Free Drones, a labourer faction.
- In Quentin Tarantino's Spaghetti Western-style film The Hateful Eight, condemned outlaw Daisy Domergue (Jennifer Jason Leigh) sings the song in reference to her captivity, altering "And I'll join the brave bushrangers there, Jack Donahue and Co." to "And you'll be dead behind me John when I get to Mexico". This change is specifically to subtly warn her captor, bounty-hunter John "The Hangman" Ruth (Kurt Russell), that she, like Jim Jones, is planning her escape from captivity followed by violent revenge against her captors. This performance is available on the film's soundtrack, The Hateful Eight. The Hateful Eight takes place during the Reconstruction Era, several decades after the song is thought to have been written but before it was first published in 1907. It was sung to the tune of Skibbereen.

== See also ==
- "Botany Bay", another Australian convict ballad
- "Wild Colonial Boy", ballad inspired by bushranger Jack Donahue

== Bibliography ==
- Charles MacAlister, Old Pioneering Days in the Sunny South (1907), "Jim Jones at Botany Bay" (1 text)
- Geoffrey Grigson (editor), The Penguin Book of Ballads (1975), 96, "Jim Jones at Botany Bay" (1 text)
- Warren Fahey, Eureka: The Songs that Made Australia (1984), pp. 28–29, "Jim Jones at Botany Bay" (1 text, 1 tune)
- J. S. Manifold, The Penguin Australian Songbook (1964), pp. 12–13, "Jim Jones" (1 text, 1 tune)
- ST PBB096 (Partial)
- Roud Folksong #5478
