= The Bushwhackers (band) =

Australian band

- Seven of the eight Bushwhackers in 1955, from the rear cover of their 1957 "Australian Bush Songs" EP. L-R: Chris Kempster, guitar; John Meredith, accordion; Alex Hood, bones; Harry Kay, harmonica; Alan Scott, tin whistle; John Barrie, tea chest bass; Cec Grivas (in place of Brian Loughlin), lagerphone. Brian Loughlin (obscured) was seated behind Kempster; his left leg (with carpet slipper) is just visible in this photograph.

Background information
- Origin: Australia
- Genres: Australian folk
- Instruments: button accordion, lagerphone, tea chest bass, guitar, tin whistle, bones
- Years active: 1952–1957
- Label: Wattle Records
- Past members: John Meredith, Jack Barrie, Brian Loughlin, Chris Kempster, Harry Kay, Alex Hood, Cecil Grivas, Alan Scott

The Bushwhackers, initially named "The Heathcote Bushwhackers", Australia's first "revival" bush band were arguably the catalyst for Australia's folk revival of the 1950s; prior to that revival, similar bush bands, utilizing a mixture of commercially available and sometimes home-made instruments, had performed a social function in rural areas since the late 19th century. The Bushwhackers performed from 1952 to 1957, when founder John Meredith disbanded the group and its members dispersed into other activities. (An unrelated group with a similar sounding name, "The Bushwackers", formed in Victoria, Australia in 1971 and continues to the present day). Over its relatively brief existence, the group evolved from an initial novelty act to one with a more serious mission of presenting and promoting to Australia its neglected bush song heritage, and laid the foundation for similar groups to follow through the 1960s and to the present. Its members also operated—at least initially—from a Marxist / Australian Communist Party ideology, attempting to embody the struggle of the working class against the ruling classes, although this may have been less than obvious to their audiences under the guise of popular entertainment.

== Band formation and source of name ==
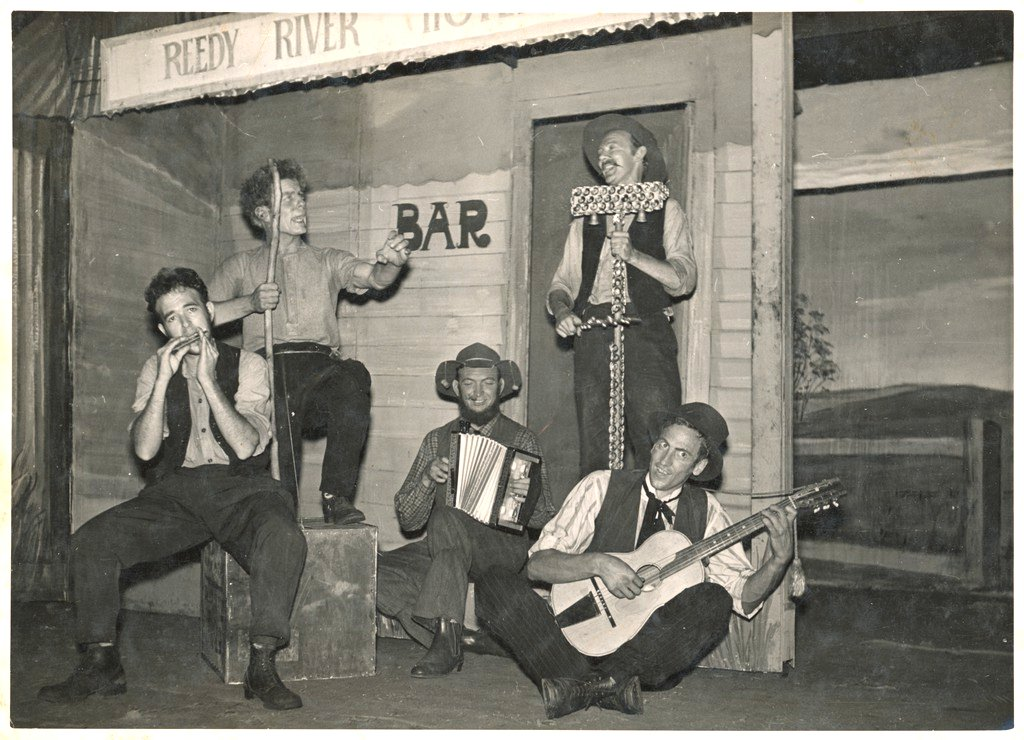
The Bushwhackers on the set of the play "Reedy River", 1953-1954. L-R: Harry Kay, Cecil Grivas, John Meredith, Brian Loughlin, Chris Kempster.

The group was originally formed as "The Heathcote Bushwhackers" in the outer Sydney suburb of Heathcote in 1952 by folklorist John Meredith together with his neighbours Jack Barrie and Brian Loughlin, to perform and popularise "bush music" and later, Australian songs that Meredith had started to collect in the field from traditional performers. In Australia, the term "to bushwhack" most commonly means to make one's way through untouched native vegetation, typically scrub or forest ("the bush") by "whacking" (cutting) a trail where none currently exists; a "bushwhacker" therefore means either such a traveller, or more generally, either a person who lives in such country, that is, off the "beaten track" (a phrase of similar derivation), or simply a resident of the countryside in general (by implication, an unsophisticated person, similar to the U.S. term "hillbilly") as opposed to a resident of the city or the suburbs. It seems likely that, at least at first, the group name was intended to be ironic, since Heathcote, although indeed a rural / "bush" area at that time, was basically a retreat for escapees from city life in search of a more rural lifestyle, who were attracted by cheap land for sale there while still with regular rail links to Sydney. Meredith resided in Heathcote from 1952 (when he moved there to share a somewhat primitive owner-built dwelling with its builder, Eric Burnett, an ex-roommate from Sydney) up to mid 1954, when he returned to the inner Sydney suburbs, taking up lodgings in Lewisham in order to avoid the long train commute from Heathcote to his job in the city, in addition to his burgeoning city-based musical activities.

In its initial lineup, the group's instrumentation was button accordion and tin whistle (played by Meredith), "bush bass" or tea chest bass played by Barrie (actually not a traditional "bush" instrument at all, but one previously played by sailors and "wharfies"), while Loughlin played the lagerphone, a home-made percussion instrument constructed by loosely nailing bottle tops to a broom handle to make a rattling sound when struck upon the floor, this example being constructed and named by Meredith's brother Claude and copied from something he had seen played by "an old rabbitter". Years later, Meredith gave the following account of their formation:

In June 1953 [sic: probably an error of recollection on Meredith's part; the year is given as 1952 in most other sources] a literary and musical evening held at Jack Barry's [sic] house at Heathcote was to have an "Australian Night" - something unique in those days when our own culture appeared in danger of being engulfed in the flood of second-rate canned American music. Jack, Brian Loughlin and I got together with button accordeon and two of our recent discoveries: a tea chest bass and a lagerphone. We stuck on false whiskers, dressed rough and gave out with our entire repertoire; Click Go The Shears, Botany Bay and Nine Miles From Gundagai. In spite of my whiskers falling off, or maybe because of them, we were an immediate success - as a comedy act! Chris Kempster joined us after that performance and then Harry Kay.

"Botany Bay" and "Click Go the Shears" were in fact learned from the repertoire of the American singer Burl Ives, who had toured Australia earlier that year and had included these and some other Australian songs in his performances, having been supplied with them in advance by the Australian collector Dr. Percy Jones. (Later these formed the basis of Ives' own albums 9 Australian Folk Songs (10", Australia, 1954) and Australian Folk Songs (USA, 1958).) Of the new recruits to the band, Chris Kempster (thirteen years younger than Meredith, and a singer on occasion to his own guitar-based accompaniment) was known to him via the Sydney based left-wing organisations the Eureka Youth League and the Unity Singers, of which both were members, while Harry Kay, also from the Eureka Youth League, played excellent harmonica.

The group gave its first public performance at the Rivoli Hall in Hurstville in late 1952, deciding to shorten its name to just "The Bushwhackers" at the same time.

== Reedy River ==
In 1953 Reedy River, an Australian musical written by Dick Diamond featuring bush and Australian folk music, opened first in Melbourne and then as an amateur production at the Sydney New Theatre, and the Bushwhackers were engaged to provide the musical accompaniment for the Sydney version, which saw the addition of one song "Widgegoeera Joe" (alternate title: "The Backblocks Shearer") which Meredith had collected earlier that year from a bush singer named Jack "Hoopiron" Lee. The production also included "Click Go the Shears", which although credited in the Reedy River Song Book to versions collected by Meredith in the field, actually derived mostly from the Burl Ives version that the band had originally learned. Performing as singers in the musical were Chris Kempster and Harry Kay, joined later in the season by Cecil Grivas, Alex Hood and Alan Scott, all of whom subsequently became assimilated into the band. Around this time, the group also supplied the songs and music for several historical radio features written for the Australian Broadcasting Commission (ABC) by Nancy Keesing.

== Subsequent activities ==
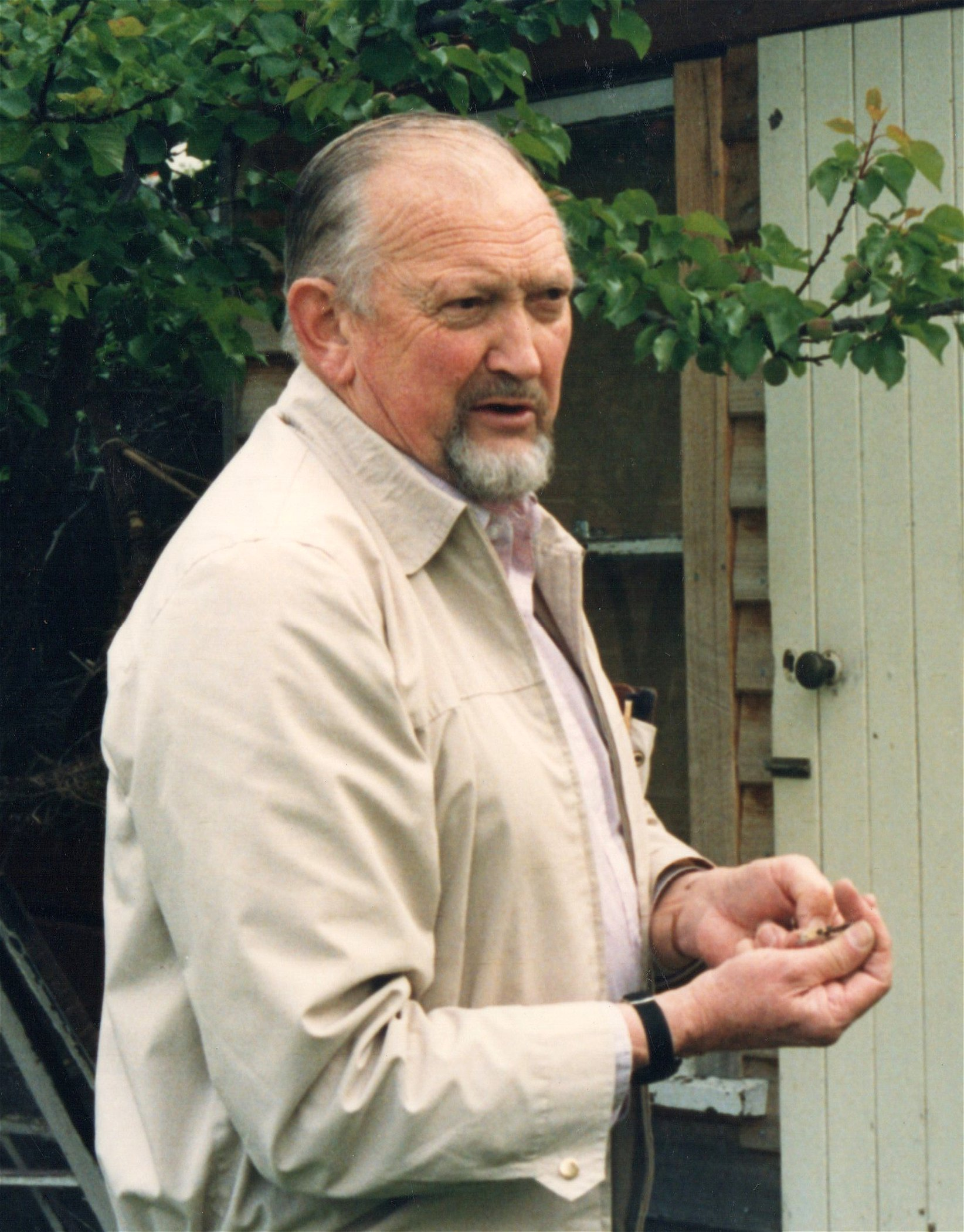
John Meredith in 1987

In 1954 the Bushwhackers, along with other folklore enthusiasts, established the Sydney Bush Music Club to encourage members of the Club and the general public to learn about and perform Australian folk and traditional music; an additional reason was to deflect more requests from interested parties to join the band, instead encouraging them to perform at the club and/or form their own groups. The band travelled outside Sydney into rural New South Wales, and Meredith and Scott often used their performances to scout out local bush musicians and singers for field recordings. In 1955 the group played for Dame Mary Gilmore's ninetieth birthday and recorded The Drover's Dream, released as a 78 rpm record on the newly established "Wattle" label, selling thousands of copies, followed by a number of other 78 recordings, as well as two 33 rpm EP releases, Australian Bush Songs and Nine Miles from Gundagai (both 1957). Other local groups taking inspiration from the Bushwhackers and/or the Bush Music Club around that time, performing similar music, included "The Overlanders" (from Leichhardt), "The Spraggers", "The Rouseabouts", and "The Drovers".

Remembering some of the group's activities some 25 years later, member Alan Scott wrote:

We were extremely popular. I have tapes of some of our radio features and they don't sound much at all but there was no doubt about the enthusiasm of our audiences... I wonder now how we coped! We held down our normal wages jobs, performed all over the place, participated in the Folk-lore Society and the Bush Music Club and were enthusiastic members of the Communist Party with all the political activity involved in that... We visited some country towns for different functions. We went down a coal mine at Lithgow and broadcast live over the radio station there where I forgot the words to Drover's Dream. We saw the Hunter River in full flood at Newcastle, put on a concert in Mudgee Town Hall and saw the remains of the Lawson Cottage at Eurunderee.

Although happy to commence, and then to continue the existence of the group under the general public perception as popular entertainment, Meredith and the other members were affiliated to the Australian Communist Party, at that time very much a focal point for idealistic youth, in particular following the end of the Second World War, together with its Marxist ideology and various offshoots such as the Eureka Youth League; in this respect, his aims paralleled those of folk-song activists working in America since the 1940s such as the Almanac Singers and The Weavers. As well as representing the struggle of the working class against the capitalist system, Meredith wanted the group to be at the vanguard of a movement to regain a national cultural identity. In his own papers of the time he wrote:

...[are] we going to plan as Marxists, and develop into a bigger, stronger and more influential group... We must regard ourselves as the spearhead in the battle for national cultural independence. Writers, poets and playwrights all play a big role in this struggle, but above all others, we must see that a song is more powerful a weapon, and has a greater and more lasting effect on the masses than, say, a story, a poem, or a play.

As the 1950s developed, Meredith in particular, sometimes assisted by other group members, became interested in collecting Australian songs "in the field" and was able to use performances by the group as a means to reach out to otherwise unknown local singers and other persons with knowledge of local, unrecorded material that he hoped to be able to capture for posterity, the start of an activity that he was to continue on his own or with other collectors long after the demise of the group. A contemporary account of the band's activities in the Sydney Morning Herald reads as follows:

In Sydney John Meredith, secretary of the Australian Folklore Society, is also the leading spirit of the Bushwhackers' Band, a group which has performed at many public functions and innumerable private parties and barbecues, and which has broadcast over the A.B.C. and other stations. ("Everyone Seems To Like It...") The band plays weird and wonderful bush-inspired instruments bones, bush bass (a "tea chest" with a double bass string that is slapped with a stick); lager-phone (an old hair broom with beer-bottle tops loosely nailed all over it), and others, as well as the button-accordion, guitar and mouth organ. The Bushwhackers' performances are only part of their crusade: wherever they give a concert they have a tape-recorder ready to collect any material which members of the audience can contribute.

== Demise of the group ==
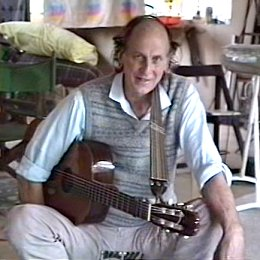
Chris Kempster in 1992

With very little notice to the group members, in 1957 Meredith abruptly decided to disband the group (minus Grivas, who had departed in 1955 due to a change in location), citing in his personal notes musical and personal differences between the older and younger members of the band: for example Kempster and Hood aspired to harmony singing, occasional solo vocals and more variety in the arrangements, Meredith's conception only involved solo singing in the verses, unison singing in the choruses, plus all the instruments playing all of the time. (By contrast, group member Alan Scott stated that in his opinion, the constant touring and rehearsing had simply got too much for Meredith, who "could not cope with all his other activities and be a Bushwhacker too".) Various of its members continued to perform in bush bands: Kempster, Hood and Kay initially as "The Three Bushwhackers" and then continuing as "The Rambleers"; Grivas with his brothers Roland and Milton as "The Galahs", already formed post his 1955 departure from the Bushwhackers; while Meredith continued to collect field recordings of Australian traditional and folk music, as well as performing with "The Shearers" and the Bush Music Club's "Concert Party".

== Reunions ==
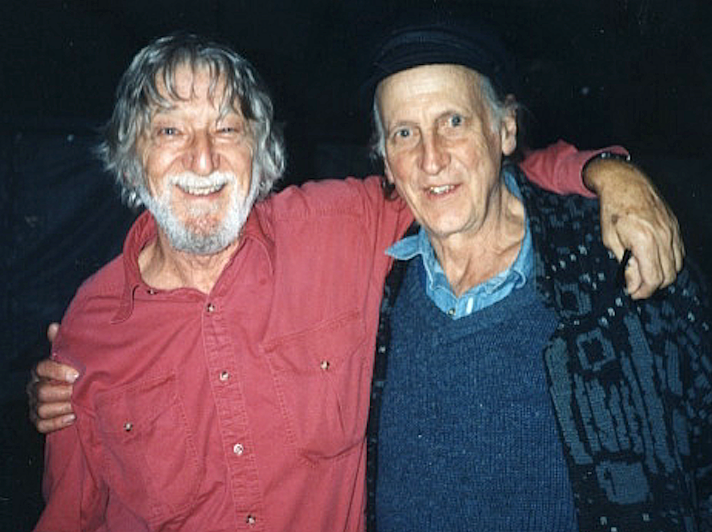
Alex Hood and Chris Kempster at Australia's National Folk Festival, Easter 2000

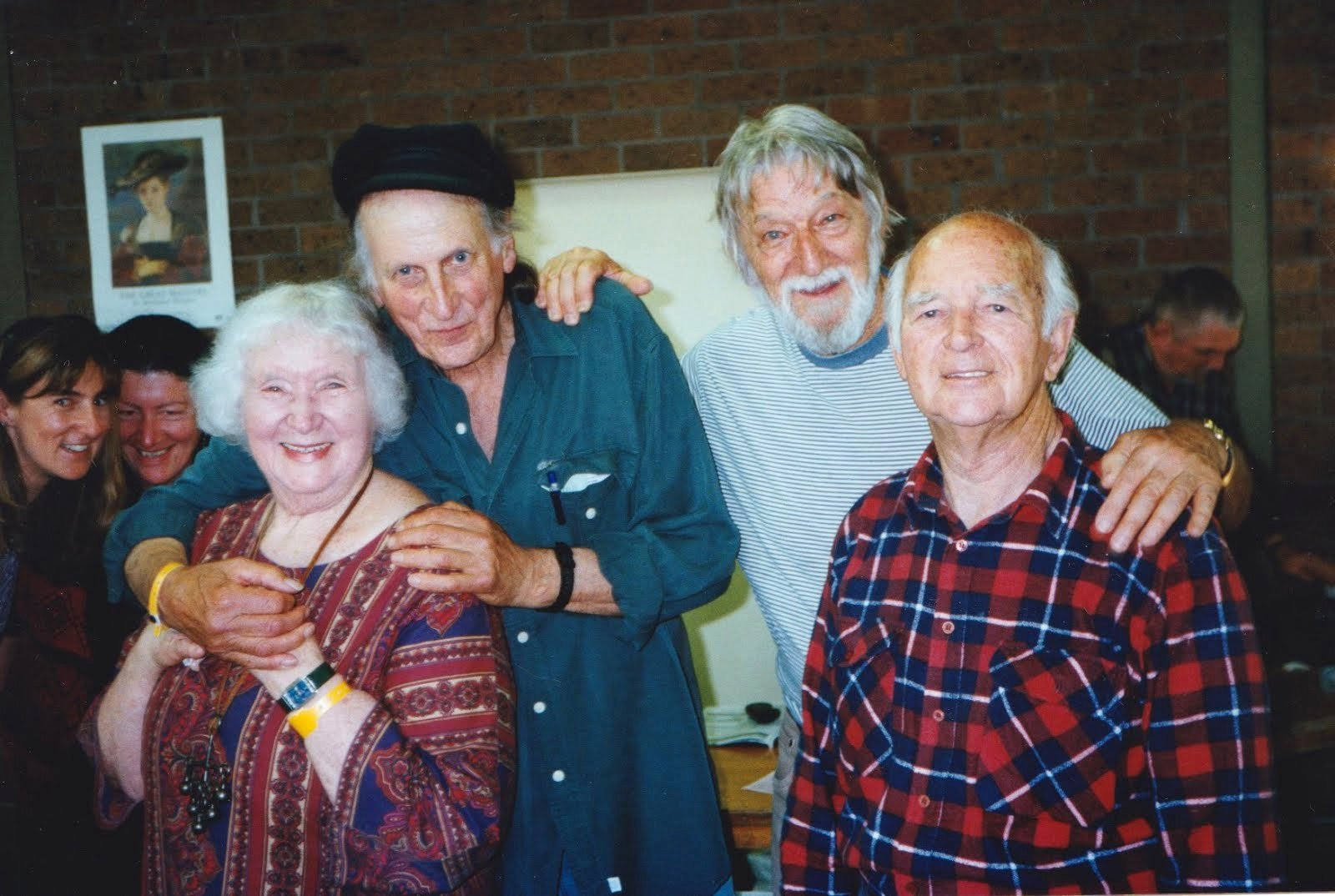
Three former members of the original Bushwhackers with their later associate Barbara Lisyak at the Illawarra Folk Festival at Jamberoo, 2002. L-R: Barbara Lisyak, Chris Kempster, Alex Hood and Harry Kay.

There were no reunions of the group during Meredith's lifetime; while he remained good friends with Loughlin and the latter's family, and also subsequently occasionally happily performed with Alan Scott, Meredith reportedly never forgave Kempster, Kay and particularly Hood for their attitudes which in his mind precipitated the demise of the Bushwhackers, as well as their later performing careers which included songs learned during their tenure with the Bushwhackers but uncredited as such on later recordings. Nevertheless, the surviving band members – apart from Cec Grivas, who was not in attendance – were present at a celebration of Meredith's life held at Gay Scott's Balmoral property in March 2001, a month after his death, and were persuaded to give a brief impromptu performance. The following year, members of the band played two 50th anniversary reunion concerts at the 2002 Australian National Folk Festival and the National Library in Canberra, plus there was an anniversary performance of Reedy River. Original members Cecil Grivas, Alex Hood, Harry Kay and Chris Kempster all took part, together with Meredith's long time friend and collecting associate Rob Willis who took the musical part of Meredith; Jack Barrie was unable to attend but sent his best wishes, Brian Loughlin having passed away earlier, in 1974. Kempster, Hood and Kay also took part in a Rambleers reunion the same year, along with their later musical associate Barbara Lisyak. Subsequently, Kempster died in January 2004 aged 70, Barrie in August 2015 (two years short of his one-hundredth birthday), and Grivas in August 2019 aged 88.

== Influence and legacy ==
Meredith's "Bushwhackers" had a musical influence far greater than their brief, 5-year life span, virtually single-handedly starting the entire Australian "bush music" revival of the 1950s, which still continues today in various forms (not least via the auspices of the Sydney Bush Music Club which Meredith and the group co-founded), as well as starting the wider Australian "folk revival" only a few years following its equivalent in the United States. Meredith's biographer, Keith McKenry, notes that the group

"...quickly realized that they had popular appeal... But were they a novelty act or serious musicians and singers? In truth [...] they were seeking to be both. The outrageous pseudo-bush garb ... was hardly calculated to engender respect or to portray serious musical intent, but increasingly that was Meredith's objective. He was coming to regard the Bushwhackers as having a mission, one of presenting and promoting to Australians their neglected bush song heritage."

In that mission, the group certainly succeeded, also assisted by the popular success of "Reedy River" which brought its included bush songs to a wide audience as well as introducing the then-novel concept of allowing the accompanying musicians to play their instruments on stage rather than out of sight, a precursor to numerous "folk song" performances that were to follow. Direct successors to the original group, such as "The Rambleers", continued Meredith's vision (with or without his blessing) in both live performances and recorded output.

Writing in 2004, and following the gift of the group's original "lagerphone" to the National Library of Australia after the group's reunion performance at the National Folk Festival in 2002, curator Mark Cranfield wrote:

...The (politically radical) Bushwhackers went on to become a leading force in the Australian folk music revival, appearing frequently at folk clubs, on record, on radio and at festivals through the 1950s ... It would be impossible to overstate John Meredith's achievements in the field of folklore, as a field collector, as a writer, as a mentor, and – in his early days – as founder and leader of the Bushwhackers.

== Unrelated group ==
An unrelated group with a similar sounding name, "The Bushwackers" (note slightly different spelling), initially "The Original Bushw[h]ackers and Bullockies Bush Band", formed in Melbourne, Australia in 1971 and continues to the present day.

== Discography and filmography ==
=== 78 and EP releases ===
"Reedy River" original cast recording:

- Diaphon presents Selections from "Reedy River". Diaphon DPR-8 (10-inch LP), 1954. Features Milton Moore, Cecil Grivas and Jack Barrie as soloists, with musical accompaniment by the Bushwhackers band.

Wattle Records "A Series" 78s

- A1 The Bushwhackers: The Drover's Dream / The Bullockies' Ball (1956)
- A2 The Bushwhackers: Travelling Down the Castlereagh / Australia's on the Wallaby (1956)
- A3 The Bushwhackers: Old Bullock Dray / Nine Miles from Gundagai (1956)
- A4 The Bushwhackers: Give a Fair Go / Rabbiter (not issued?)
- A5 The Bushwhackers: Botany Bay / Click Go the Shears (1956)
- A11 The Bushwhackers: Black Velvet Band / The Hut That's Upside-Down (1956)

"B Series" 7-inch 33 rpm EPs

- B1 The Bushwhackers: Australian Bush Songs (1957)
- ?? The Bushwhackers: Nine Miles from Gundagai (1957)

=== Reissues ===
"The Ballad of 1891" (Reedy River Cast recording, from the 10-inch LP) "The Drover's Dream" (Wattle 78 rpm single featuring Alan Scott), and "Click Go the Shears" (Wattle 78 rpm single featuring Brian Loughlin) are included on the CD accompanying Keith McKenry's 2014 book More Than a Life: John Meredith and the Fight for Australian Tradition, CD reference Fanged Wombat Productions FWD 011.

=== Short films ===
- 3 in 1. Directed by Cec Holmes
- Wattle Ballad Series No. 4, The Old Bullock Dray, The Bushwhackers 1961
