= Duke Tritton =

Australian poet and singer

- Tritton photographed by John Meredith in 1956

Background information
- Born: Harold Percy Croydon Tritton; 3 October 1886; Five Dock, New South Wales, Australia
- Died: 17 May 1965 (aged 78) Sydney, New South Wales, Australia
- Genres: Folk
- Occupations: Folk singer; shearer
- Instrument: Vocals
- Years active: 1905–1965
- Labels: Wattle

Harold Percival Croydon "Duke" Tritton (1886-1965) was an Australian poet, folk singer and shearer. His best-known poem, The Sandy Hollow Line, described the hardships of unemployed workers who were given 'sustenance' or 'susso' work such as the construction the Sandy Hollow Maryvale Railway during the Great Depression. The poem was set to music by John Dengate and was subsequently recorded by local artists including Warren Fahey.

Tritton was an early member of the Sydney Bush Music Club, which formed in 1954. He assisted John Meredith in collecting old bush songs. His autobiography, Time Means Tucker, was published by The Bulletin in 1959. This publication was a great success and was re-printed numerous times.

== Biography ==
Harold Percival Croydon Tritton was born in 1886 in Five Dock as the second son of Edgar Joseph Tritton, a labourer, and Frances née Lane. After leaving school at 13 he undertook a range of jobs including fisherman, newsboy, factory worker, apprentice and builder's labourer. From 1905 he worked as a shearer across inland New South Wales – alongside his friend, "Dutchy" Holand. Outside of shearing he also worked as a fencer, timber cutter, coach driver, road worker, fossicker, rabbiter and a boxer – the latter provided his nickname, "Duke".

While working in rural areas, Tritton started performing as a folk singer, often accompanied by "Dutchy" Simpson. During that time he wrote bush songs such as, "Shearing in a Bar", "The Gooseneck Spurs" and "Hughie". In December 1909 he married Caroline Goodman. Early in their marriage they lived in Mudgee and Tritton worked in Cullenbone. He was initially rejected for army service during World War 1 due to "flat feet"; after being accepted in 1918 he saw no active service since the conflict ended soon after.

The Tritton family moved to Sydney in 1919 where he worked delivering timber, they returned to Mudgee in 1927 after a timber strike. In 1933 they bought a property in Cullenbone where the family of ten children lived until 1938 when they moved back to Sydney. During World War 2 he attempted to enlist and worked as a timber deliverer until he was accepted in April 1942 as a private in the Australian Army. He returned to Cullenbone until he retired to Sydney in 1957.

In the 1950s Australian folklorist, John Meredith, was collecting and recording "old-timer singers born in the late 1800s, singing and playing old bush songs." Tritton responded to an article in The Bulletin in November 1954 by Meredith calling for "'missing' verses, songs and bush ballads." In 1957 two of his songs were recorded for a various artists' album, Australian Traditional Singers and Musicians via Wattle Records.

Tritton sometimes joined Meredith's ensemble, The Bushwhackers, as a singer, which was heard on radio and appeared in public performances. He wrote his memoirs, Time Means Tucker, in 1959, which appeared in The Bulletin. In 1964 it was re-published, as a book, by Shakespeare Head Press. Tritton died in May 1965, aged 78 and was survived by his wife, Caroline, and nine of their ten children. According to Tribune's D. K., "[he] could talk about the big shearing strikes from close knowledge, could yarn as easily with the Governor-General as with a young folk song enthusiast – and his life spanned more than a half century of Australian experience and tradition."
