= Bush dance =

Style of dance from Australia

Bush dance is a style of dance from Australia, particularly where the music is provided by a bush band. The dances are mainly based on the traditional folk dances of the UK, Ireland and central Europe.

== Eras of bush dance in Australia ==
- Early European 1770–1850 settlers came with their local dance traditions.
- Gold rush 1850–1860 miners brought dances from Europe some via the American gold rush.
- Pastoral period 1860–1950 rural woolshed balls and dances in local halls.
- Revival 1950–1960 collectors and enthusiasts document and perform dances.
- Recent popularity 1970–1980 most areas and many social clubs have regular Bushy Balls.

== Dance styles ==
- Bush dance – in general less emphasis on complex foot work and more about people being in the right place. Dress codes are relaxed.
- Colonial dance – more concern for correct foot work. Many of the dances are unique to Australia. Dress code usually period costume.

== Dance formations ==
Dances can be grouped by the formations of the dancers.

=== Big circle dances ===
Alternate men and women in a circle or horse shoe (example Stockyards)

=== Closed-couples dance ..... ===
Men and women in a ballroom or similar hold arranged around the room (example Brown Jug Polka)

=== Longways sets ===
3 to 8 couples in two lines, ladies face the band, men face the ladies. Top couple on the band's left. If up and down the hall, ladies on band's left, top couple nearest the band (example Galopede)

=== Sicilian circle dances ===
Couples facing each other at right angles to the line-of-dance around the room. Usually a progressive dance, so half the dancers will progress clockwise and half anti-clockwise. Double Sicilian is 2 couples, facing 2 couples (example Cottages)

=== Trio dances ===
Lines of three, a man and two women or two women and a man facing a similar line. Sets arranged around the room (example Dashing White Sergeant)

=== Quadrilles ===
Four couples arranged on the sides of a square (example Colonial’s Quadrille).

For more details refer to Quadrilles.

== Music ==
Tunes are mostly traditional UK and Irish tunes. UK, Irish and USA session players would know variations of most of the tunes.

Rhythms include – Reel, Jig, March, Waltz and Hornpipe.

Instruments – Fiddle, Piano, Accordion both Piano and Melodeon, Concertina; both English and Anglo, Tin whistle, Bush bass, Guitar, Banjo and all types of Percussion, including lagerphone. Electric amplified instruments, such as electric bass guitar or electric guitar have been used since the 1970s.

== American connection ==
Bush dances are similar to American line dances or American square dances, in that all dancers know certain steps and execute them together. Partners are often changed in the course of the dance. There are many standard dances that dancers are either taught or expected to know, such as The Ninepins Quadrille (nicknamed The Drongo by The Bushwackers)in which one person is excluded from the group when they have no partner and are 'mocked' by the others. Another popular, simple, progressive dance, often used with children, is the Heel-Toe Polka (also known as the Brown Jug Polka), where partners slap their knees, hands and partners' hands.

== See also ==
- Australian folk music
- Bush band
- Ceilidh
- English country dance
- Irish dance
- Scottish country dance
