= The Hateful Eight (soundtrack) =

2015 soundtrack album by Ennio Morricone

The Hateful Eight (Original Motion Picture Soundtrack)

Soundtrack album by Ennio Morricone
- Released: December 18, 2015
- Recorded: July 2015
- Studios: CNSO/Sound Trust Studios, Prague
- Genres: Film score; alternative rock; rock and roll
- Length: 72:47
- Labels: Decca; Third Man
- Producers: Ennio Morricone; Quentin Tarantino

Ennio Morricone chronology
En mai, fais ce qu'il te plait (2015)	The Hateful Eight (Original Motion Picture Soundtrack) (2015)	The Correspondence (2016)

Professional ratings
Review scores
Source	Rating
Allmusic	3.5/5 stars
Consequence	B+
Movie-wave.net	4/5 stars
Pitchfork	8.0/10
Soundtrack Geek	88.5/100
Filmtracks.com	4/5 stars

The Hateful Eight (Original Motion Picture Soundtrack) (stylized as Quentin Tarantino's The H8ful Eight) is the soundtrack album to Quentin Tarantino's 2015 motion picture The Hateful Eight. The soundtrack includes the only complete original score for a Tarantino film and is composed, orchestrated and conducted by Ennio Morricone. Morricone composed 50 minutes of original music for The Hateful Eight.

The Hateful Eight was the composer's first score for a Western film since Buddy Goes West (1981) and the first for a Hollywood production since Ripley's Game (2002). The score features notable horror references including Morricone's repurposed score from John Carpenter's The Thing (1982) and "Regan's Theme" from Exorcist II: The Heretic (1977), which serve the sinister mood.

In addition to Morricone's music, the album includes three songs which are featured in the film; The White Stripes' "Apple Blossom" (2000), David Hess' "Now You're All Alone" (1972) (originally from The Last House on the Left's soundtrack) and Roy Orbison's "There Won't Be Many Coming Home" (1966), as well as dialogue clips from the film. The trailer used the instrumental version of the song "Same Ol'" from The Heavy.

The soundtrack won a Golden Globe and Academy Award for Best Original Score on 28 February 2016.

The opening track, "L'ultima diligenza di Red Rock" (Versione Integrale), was released as a single online on December 15, 2015. In December 2016, it gained a nomination for a Grammy Award for Best Instrumental Composition for Morricone.

== Background ==
Tarantino originally wanted Morricone to compose the soundtrack for Inglourious Basterds. However, Morricone refused because of the sped-up production schedule of the film. He also turned down an offer to write some music for Pulp Fiction in 1994.

Tarantino previously used Morricone's music in Kill Bill, Death Proof, Inglourious Basterds, and Django Unchained, and Morricone also wrote an original song, "Ancora Qui", sung by Elisa, for the latter.

Morricone had previously made statements that he would "never work" with Tarantino after Django Unchained. The composer stated Tarantino used the music "without coherence" and that he "wouldn't like to work with him again, on anything". He quickly released a statement clarifying that his remarks were taken out of context, Morricone said that he has "great respect for Tarantino" and that he is "glad he chooses my music". He also said that because Tarantino chooses his music "it is a sign of artistic brotherhood".

On June 12, 2015, Tarantino held court at Italy's 59th David di Donatello Awards in Rome, which he attended to collect prizes from several years back for Pulp Fiction and Django Unchained. Tarantino was handed two statuettes by Morricone. Both artists revealed that they met a day earlier and that Morricone agreed to compose music for a Tarantino movie. In July 2015, Tarantino announced after the screening of footage of The Hateful Eight at San Diego Comic-Con that Morricone would score the film, the first Western Morricone has scored since 1981.

== Recording process ==
Morricone supplied music largely inspired by The Hateful Eight's screenplay. The music is moody, tension-building work with music box nods to the Italian Giallo genre.

The recording sessions began on July 18 at the Czech National Symphony Orchestra's studio "soundtrust" in Hostivař, Prague. Morricone previously conducted the orchestra CNSO for his soundtrack to Giuseppe Tornatore's The Best Offer (2013) and during his 60th Anniversary Tour. Quentin Tarantino was also present during the 3-day recording sessions to supervise the work.

In an August 2015 interview with Vulture, when Tarantino was asked how Morricone's score sounded, he joked, "It's horrible. What do you expect me to say?...You'll hear it when you see it. It's absolutely abysmal. No, there's no whistling in this score."

In a September 2015 interview with Dutch television broadcaster AVROTROS, Morricone stated that he did not want to repeat himself: "Can I repeat for Tarantino what I've done for Sergio Leone? It's not possible, right? It would be absurd. It would make Tarantino's movie look hideous, because that music is old, you see. I had to write it in another way. But I have written very important music for him. I don't know if he directly realized that, or if the others did. They didn't expect that music, that's why they didn't understand it. But he told me, after he had listened to it twice: it's ok, I like it. But at first it had been a shock. He had expected something completely different. But I didn't give that to him, because I didn't want to give him something he knew already."

== Track listing ==
All tracks composed, orchestrated, and conducted by Ennio Morricone, except where noted:

No.	Title	Writer(s)	Artist(s)	Length
1.	"L'ultima diligenza di Red Rock" (The Last Stage to Red Rock) [Versione Integrale]"			7:30
2.	"Ouverture"			3:11
3.	"Major Warren Meet Daisy Domergue" (Dialogue)		Jennifer Jason Leigh, Kurt Russell and Samuel L. Jackson	0:32
4.	"Narratore letterario (Literary Narrator)"			1:59
5.	"Apple Blossom"	Jack White	The White Stripes	2:13
6.	"Frontier Justice" (Dialogue)		Tim Roth and Kurt Russell	1:50
7.	""L'ultima diligenza di Red Rock" (The Last Stage to Red Rock) [#2]"			2:37
8.	"Neve (Snow)"			12:16
9.	"This Here Is Daisy Domergue" (Dialogue)		Kurt Russell and Michael Madsen	1:01
10.	"Sei cavalli (Six Horses)"			1:21
11.	"Raggi di sole sulla montagna (Rays of Sun on the Mountain)"			1:41
12.	"Son of the Bloody Nigger Killer of Baton Rouge" (Dialogue)		Samuel L. Jackson, Walton Goggins and Bruce Dern	2:43
13.	"Jim Jones at Botany Bay" (Song and dialogue)	Traditional	Jennifer Jason Leigh and Kurt Russell	4:10
14.	"Neve (Snow) [#2]"			2:05
15.	"Uncle Charlie's Stew" (Dialogue)		Samuel L. Jackson, Demián Bichir and Walton Goggins	1:41
16.	"I quattro passeggeri (The Four Passengers)"			1:49
17.	"La musica prima del massacro (Music Before the Massacre)"			2:00
18.	"L'inferno bianco (White Hell) [Synth]"			3:31
19.	"The Suggestive Oswaldo Mobray" (Dialogue)		Tim Roth, Walton Goggins and Kurt Russell	0:47
20.	"Now You're All Alone (Note: Originally from the 1972 film The Last House on the Left)"	David Hess	David Hess	1:29
21.	"Sangue e neve (Blood and Snow)"			2:05
22.	"L'inferno bianco (White Hell) [Ottoni]"			3:31
23.	"Neve (Snow) [#3]"			2:02
24.	"Daisy's Speech" (Dialogue)		Walton Goggins, Jennifer Jason Leigh and Michael Madsen	1:32
25.	"La lettera di Lincoln (The Lincoln Letter) [Strumentale]"			1:41
26.	"La lettera di Lincoln (The Lincoln Letter) [Con dialogo]"			1:46
27.	"There Won't Be Many Coming Home (Note: Originally from the 1967 film The Fastest Guitar Alive)"	Roy Orbison; Bill Dees	Roy Orbison	2:44
28.	"La puntura della morte (The Sting of Death)"			0:27
Total length:				72:47

=== Film music not included on the album ===
1. "Regan's Theme (Floating Sound)"—Ennio Morricone (from Exorcist II: The Heretic (1977))
2. "Eternity"—Ennio Morricone (from The Thing (1982))
3. "Silent Night"—Demián Bichir
4. "Ready for the Times to Get Better"-Crystal Gayle (exclusively used in the Roadshow for the opening of Chapter 4 - Domergue's Got a Secret)
5. "Bestiality"—Ennio Morricone (from The Thing)
6. "Despair"—Ennio Morricone (from The Thing)

The film's trailer used Welshly Arms' cover of "Hold On, I'm Coming", although this is not used in the film itself.

== For Your Consideration promo album ==
The Hateful Eight (For Your Consideration)

Soundtrack album by Ennio Morricone
- Recorded: July 2015
- Studios: CNSO/Sound Trust Studios, Prague
- Genre: Film score
- Length: 30:02
- Label: The Weinstein Company

As with all awards seasons, a For Your Consideration album leaked online, featuring a number of differences from the general release album.

All tracks are written by Ennio Morricone.

No.	Title	Length
1.	"Ouverture"	3:11
2.	"Titoli Principali"	4:40
3.	"Capitolo Tre"	3:23
4.	"Cominciando A Vedere"	3:23
5.	"La Pugnalata Della Morte"	0:33
6.	"Andiamo Un Po' Indietro"	1:00
7.	"Io Non Ho La Pistola"	1:03
8.	"Narratore letterario"	1:59
9.	"I quattro passeggeri"	1:49
10.	"La musica prima del massacro"	2:00
11.	"Com'e Il Caffè?"	1:18
12.	"Svegliati Bambino Bianco"	3:31
13.	"La lettera di Lincoln"	1:44
14.	"Titoli Finali"	1:39
Total length:		30:02

== Personnel ==
Score composed, orchestrated, conducted and produced by Ennio Morricone.

- Czech National Symphony Orchestra – orchestra
- Jan Hasenöhrl – trumpet
- Fabio Venturi – recording and sound mix
- Dusan Mihely – orchestra coordinator

== Accolades ==
Awards
Award	Date of ceremony	Category	Recipient	Outcome
Academy Awards	February 28, 2016	Best Original Score	Ennio Morricone	Won
Austin Film Critics Association Awards	December 29, 2015	Best Score	Ennio Morricone	Won
British Academy Film Awards	February 14, 2016	Best Original Music	Ennio Morricone	Won
Chicago Film Critics Association	December 21, 2015	Best Original Score	Ennio Morricone	Won
Central Ohio Film Critics Association	January 7, 2016	Best Original Score	Ennio Morricone	Won
Critics' Choice Movie Awards	January 17, 2016	Best Composer	Ennio Morricone	Won
Denver Film Critics Society	January 11, 2016	Best Original Score	Ennio Morricone	Won
Houston Film Critics Society Awards	January 17, 2016	Best Original Score	Ennio Morricone	Won
Golden Globe Awards	January 10, 2016	Best Original Score	Ennio Morricone	Won
Indiana Film Journalists Association Awards	January 4, 2016	Best Musical Score	Ennio Morricone	Nominated
New York Film Critics Circle Awards	December 2, 2015	Special Award	Ennio Morricone	Won
San Diego Film Critics Society	December 14, 2015	Best Use of Music in a Film	The Hateful Eight	Won
Los Angeles Film Critics Association, 2nd place	December 2015	Best Score	Ennio Morricone	Won
Washington D.C. Area Film Critics Association	December 2015	Best Score	Ennio Morricone	Nominated
AWFJ Award	January 12, 2016	Best Film Music Or Score	Ennio Morricone	Won
DFWFCA Award 2nd place	2015	Best Musical Score	Ennio Morricone	Won
FFCC Award	2015	Best Score	Ennio Morricone	Nominated
Georgia Film Critics Association	January 8, 2016	Best Original Score	Ennio Morricone	Won

== Charts ==
Chart (2015–16)	Peak position
Austrian Albums (Ö3 Austria)	54
Belgian Albums (Ultratop Flanders)	18
Belgian Albums (Ultratop Wallonia)	69
French Albums (SNEP)	126
German Albums (Offizielle Top 100)	82
Irish Albums (IRMA)	96
Italian Compilation Albums (FIMI)	3
Italian Vinyl Records (FIMI)	8
UK Soundtrack Albums (VG-lista)	5
