= Click Go the Shears =

Australian country song

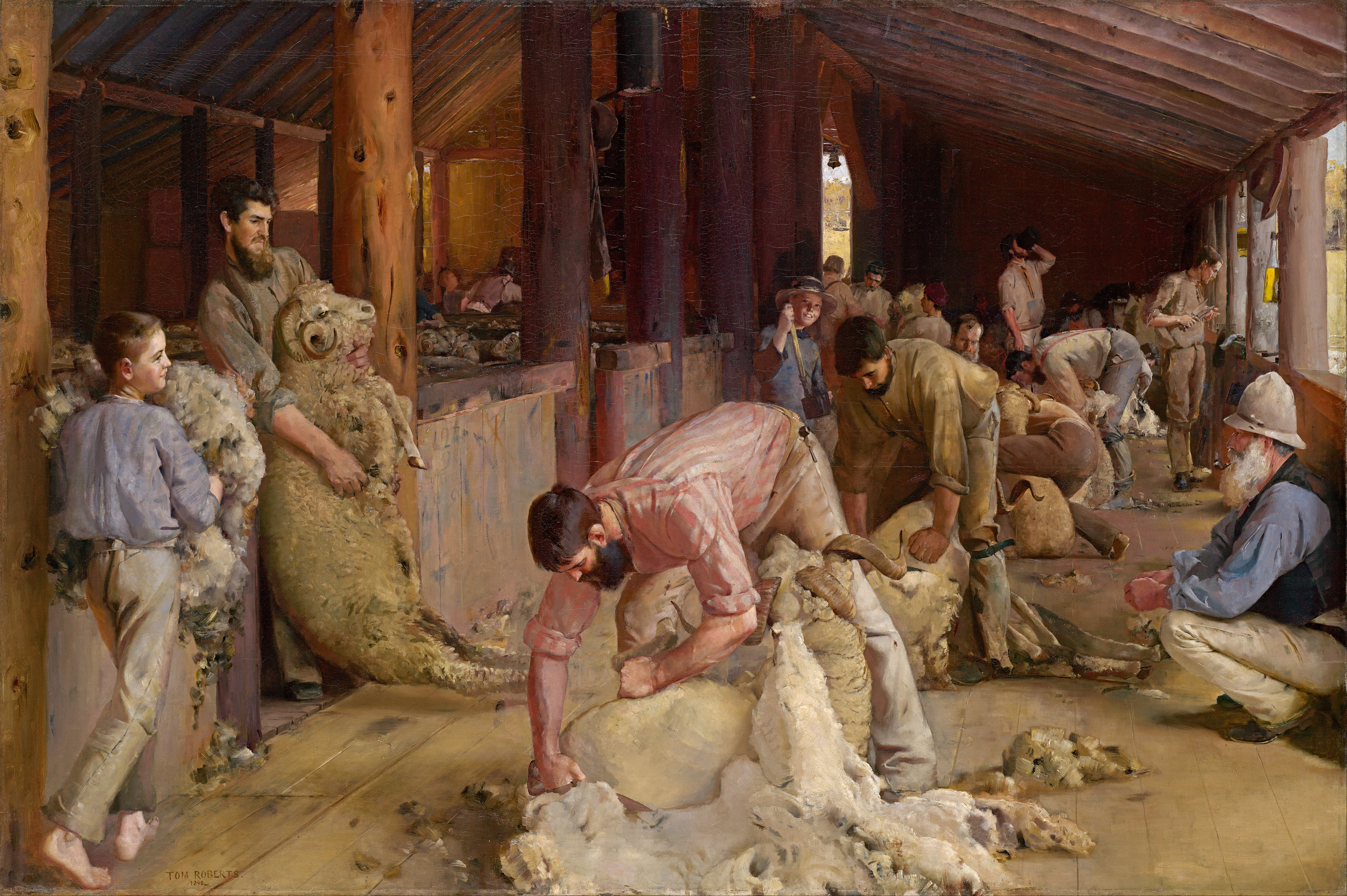
Tom Roberts: Shearing the Rams (1890)

"Click Go the Shears" is a traditional Australian country song. The song details a day's work for a sheep shearer in the days before machine shearing.

== Song ==
The enduring popularity of the song reflects the traditional role that the wool industry has played in Australian life. The song describes the various roles in the shearing shed, including the "ringer", the "boss of the board", the "colonial experience man" and the "tar boy". After the day's shearing, the "old shearer" takes his cheque and heads to the local pub for a drinking session.

The tune is from the American Civil War song "Ring the Bell, Watchman", by Henry Clay Work, and the first verse follows closely, in parody, Work's lyrics as well. It was originally named "The Bare Bellied Ewe", and only became popular in the 1950s, more than half a century later.

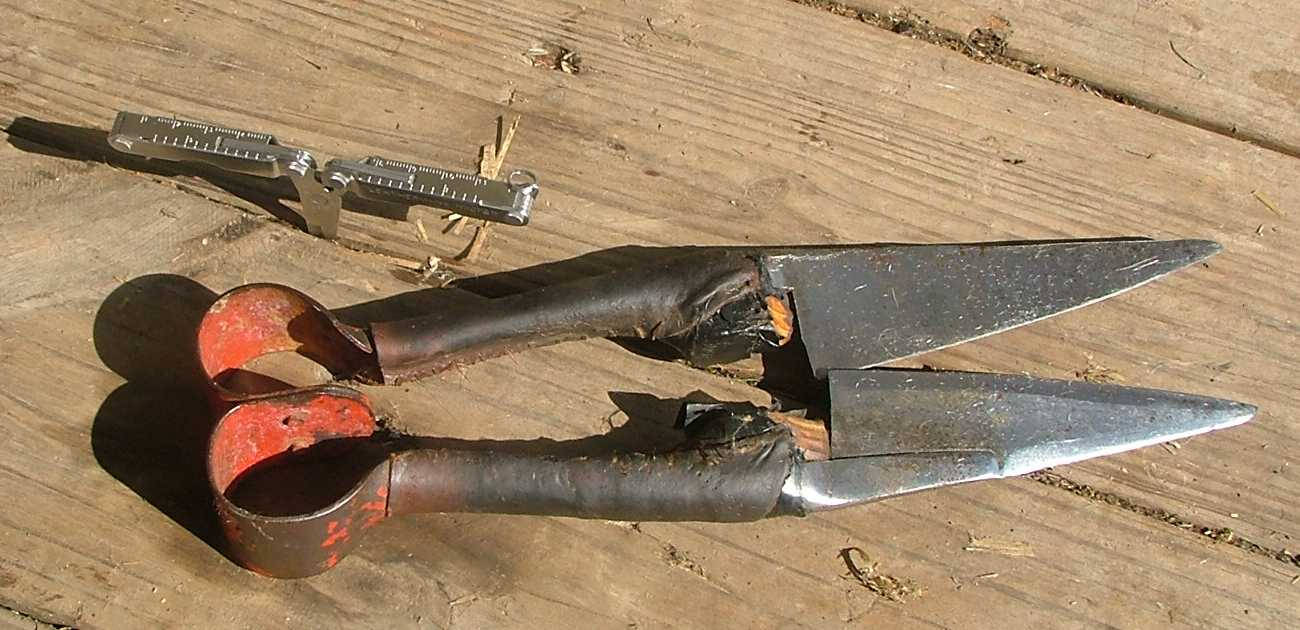
A pair of blade shears

The second verse in the original 19th-century song is as follows:

Click goes his shears; click, click, click.
Wide are the blows, and his hand is moving quick,
The ringer looks round, for he lost it by a blow,
And he curses that old shearer with the bare belled ewe.

The usual chorus of the song is as follows:

Click go the shears boys, click, click, click,
Wide is his blow and his hands move quick,
The ringer looks around and is beaten by a blow,
And curses the old snagger with the bare-bellied yoe

In June 2013, folklorist Mark Gregory discovered that a version of the song was first published in 1891 in the regional Victorian newspaper the Bacchus Marsh Express under the title "The Bare Belled Ewe" and the tune given as "Ring the Bell Watchman." That version was signed "C. C. Eynesbury, Nov. 20, 1891," Eynesbury being a rural property in the Bacchus Marsh area. It is possible that "C.C." was the author of the song.

The song was next published in 1939 in two Australian newspapers and then, in 1946, as a traditional song "collected and arranged" by musicologist the Reverend Dr Percy Jones. The lyrics vary widely: "bare-bellied yoe" (yoe is a dialect word for ewe) is often "bare-bellied joe" or even "blue-bellied ewe". The last line in the verse about the "colonial experience" man "smelling like a whore" is often bowdlerised to "smelling like a sewer" or completely rewritten.

The song has been recorded by many artists, notably in 1952 by the American folk musician Burl Ives, for his album Australian Folk Songs. Other versions were recorded by the British folklorist A. L. Lloyd in 1956 and American singer William Clauson in 1958. In January 2014, Chloe and Jason Roweth sang the 1891 version of the song for an ABC TV story.

== Other uses ==
There was a shearers' strike in 1891 so the publication of the song in that year would have resonated with the Australian community.

The song has been recorded by many artists, notably in 1952 by the American folk musician Burl Ives, for his album Australian Folk Songs. Other versions were recorded by the British folklorist A. L. Lloyd in 1956 and American singer William Clauson in 1958. In January 2014, Chloe and Jason Roweth sang the 1891 version of the song for an ABC TV story.

1966 government advertisement jingle on the change to decimal currency to the tune of Click Go the Shears. The full song is at 3:30.

When Australia decimalised the pound with the dollar in 1966, a jingle that accompanied the changeover was written to the same tune:

In come the dollars; in come the cents,
To replace the pounds and the shillings and the pence,
Be prepared folks, when the coins begin to mix,
On the fourteenth of February, nineteen-sixty-six.

In 1973, when Gough Whitlam, a former Australian Prime Minister, visited the People's Republic of China, "Click Go the Shears" was played through loudspeakers along the route of the Prime Minister's motorcade from Peking International Airport to his hotel.

In 1988, Australian-British singer Olivia Newton-John included the song in her Olivia Down Under television special.

== See also ==
- Tom Roberts
- Sheep shearer
- Rolf Harris
- Reedy River
