= Sydney City Trash =

Australian musical group

- Origin: Sydney, New South Wales, Australia
- Genres: country music, post-punk, rock
- Years active: 2004–
- Label: Dead Kernaghan
- Members: Mitchy Hell; Paddy Smiles McHugh; Browny "First Name Redacted" Brown; Jim Mongrel; Austin Red Citizen; Jim Eric Bones
- Past members: A.B.W. Howie and Pig Barnett
- Website: http://troubadour-music.com/blog/?page_id=30

Sydney City Trash is a Sydney, Australia based country/punk band. Three of its six members grew up in Tamworth, which is also Australia's Country Music Capital and their country roots are frequently reflected in the band's lyrics. The band has been described as the saviours of Australian Country, and is widely respected for its bitingly satirical and dense storytelling lyrics.

== History ==
Vocalist and Lyricist Mitch Hell was raised in Tamworth. After moving to Sydney and fronting various punk, straight edge, hardcore and Oi! bands he met up with former high school mate and fellow Tamworth survivor Paddy 'Toots' McHugh in spring of 2001. The pair wrote their first song, "Whiskey in the Sun", in early 2002 and recorded several incarnations of the song over the next year. However it wasn't until 2003 with the addition of another Tamworth resident, Browny "Barbecue" Brown, that the band really started taking shape.

The trio busked on the streets of Tamworth during the 2003 Tamworth Country Music Festival, playing mainly covers by Merle Haggard, David Allan Coe, The Descendents and The Clash. They then went to Hilltop Studios in Tamworth to record a demo with the idea of getting a real band together.

The demo worked and by mid-2003 the boys had recruited a drummer A.B.W. Howie (also from Tamworth) a bass player Pig Barnett and even a fiddle player Jim Eric Bones whom was then playing guitar for death metal band Punisha. All six members of the band rehearsed and in late 2003 went back into Hilltop Studio to record their first EP, Classic Cuntry Hits.

They became inspired by old Australian bush and folk bands such as Redgum, Roaring Jack and Dingo. They were also heavily influenced by Celtic punk bands such as the Pogues and Flogging Molly. All these influences were used and shaped to make the band's first full-length album Once Upon A Time in Australia which was released on Scott Mac of Toe to Toe's label Sold Our Souls. The album sold over 5,000 copies and the band played across Australia.

Drummer A.B.W. Howie left due to irreconcilable musical differences regarding the vocal stylings of the group, and he was replaced by Irish Austin Citizen. Another set back was the loss of the Pig on bass. He was replaced by Jim Mongrel from various south coast punk bands, most notably Run For Cover. It was with this new line up the band went to record at the Brain Studios in Surry Hills in early 2009 producing the third and final full-length album Terror Australis.

In 2013 the entire back catalog was released as a downloads on Bandcamp.

== Discography ==
- Classic Country Hits (2004)
- Once Upon A Time in Australia (2006)
- Terror Australis (2009)

== Members ==
- Mitch Hell (vocals, lyrics)
- "Browny" Brown (lead guitar)
- Paddy Finn McHugh (rhythm guitar)
- Jamie "Jim Mongrel" Skjeme (bass)
- James Eric Bones (fiddle, mandolin)
- Austin Ringo Citizen (drums)
