= Australian Folk Songs =

Studio album by Burl Ives
- Released: 1958
- Genre: Folk
- Length: 32:18
- Label: Decca

Burl Ives chronology
| Old Time Varieties (1958) | Australian Folk Songs (1958) | A Lincoln Treasury (1959) |

Australian Folk Songs (Decca DL 8749) is a 1958 album by Burl Ives. During his visit to Australia in 1952, invited there by the Australian Broadcasting Commission, Ives met the Reverend Percy Jones, a professor of music at the University of Melbourne. The two men compiled a book of Australian folk songs and Ives recorded an album 9 Australian Folk Songs in 1954, "collected and arranged" by Jones, which then became the raw material for most of this album, released in the United States and elsewhere as Australian Folk Songs.

The American cover of the album depicts Ives in a stereotypical Australian setting, standing in front of a poster of a kangaroo and interacting with a koala.

== Reception ==
Professional ratings
Review scores
| Source | Rating |
|---|---|
| AllMusic | 4.5/5 stars |

In his AllMusic review, critic Bruce Eder highly praised the album and wrote "while a lot that's on this has been bypassed and supplanted by subsequent efforts, it's still vital listening, and even more so when one appreciates the circumstances of its recording and origins. It offers some of the most spare and authentic settings of Ives' entire career ... and also some of Ives' most rousing and spirited singing ... Even the seemingly familiar titles are presented in uniquely Australian incarnations that transform them into something new and wonderful to hear; and it has to be remembered that virtually everything here was being put on record for the very first time; and the record's subsequent release in America was just as special an event at the time. And of all of Ives' 1950s albums, this is the one whose absence on CD (as of 2009) is a true musical crime, as well as an affront to Ives' history and memory."

== Track listing ==
=== Side one ===
1. "Wild Rover No More" – 2:24
2. "Click Go the Shears" – 4:28
3. "The Wild Colonial Boy" – 2:23
4. "A Nautical Yarn" – 2:06
5. "Across the Western Plains I Must Wander" – 2:10
6. "Waltzing Matilda" – 2:25

=== Side two ===
1. "Oh! The Springtime, It Brings on the Shearing" – 1:44
2. "The Station Cook" – 1:47
3. "The Dying Stockman" – 3:52
4. "Botany Bay" – 3:25
5. "The Old Bullock Dray" – 2:58
6. "The Stockman's Last Bed" – 2:36
