= Chloë and Jason Roweth =

Australian folk music duo

Chloë Roweth (born 1972) and Jason Roweth (born 1969) are Australian singers and instrumentalists who perform folk music, original and contemporary music." Their CD A Voice that was Still was awarded the National Folk Recording Award for 2010 by the National Film and Sound Archive at the Australian National Folk Festival.

Chloë Roweth was born in Cape Town, South Africa, and went to Australia with her family in 1984. She met Jason Roweth at university in 1991 and they later married.

Jason Roweth was born in Newcastle, New South Wales and was interested in music, musical instruments and composing songs from an early age. He gained first place in the music course for the New South Wales Higher School Certificate at Red Bend Catholic College, Forbes, New South Wales. He moved to Sydney in 1986, seeking to become a professional musician.

The couple released their first music CD, Wailing Bizarre in 1995. They went on to release more than fifteen CDs. On a number of these they performed as Us Not Them, singing and playing acoustic guitar, mandolin, electric guitar and bass. They also recorded music as Collector, collaborating with other artists.

In live performances they have combined with Bill Browne to perform as Battler's Ballad.

In 2012 the Roweths appeared on stage in country music concerts organised by the team at ABC Radio's Australia All Over programme.

== Discography ==
- Wailing Bizarre – Chloë & Jason Roweth (1995) (CD)
- Feet in the Dirt...Head in the Clouds – Us Not Them (1997) (CD)
- Jindi Plays Joe Jindi (1998) (CD)
- Songs of the Bush and Beyond – Us Not Them (1998) (CD)
- Sleepers – Us Not Them (2000) (CD)
- One Man’s Weeds, Another Man’s Flowers (Live at Wongawilli Hall) – Us Not Them (2001) (CD)
- Coming In From the Old Collector (2002) (CD)
- As Good As New – Us Not Them and Friends (2003) (CD)
- Pumpkin & Bear – Collector (2004) (CD)
- Spring Grove [Formerly Daisy Hill] – Chloë & Jason Roweth (2005) (CD)
- The Riderless Horse: An Australian Impression of WW1 – Chloë & Jason Roweth (2005) (CD)
- Another Threshing Day – Chloë and Jason Roweth with Jim McWhinnie (2006) (CD)
- The Perthville Sessions – Crank Handle (2007) (CD)
- A Voice That Was Still – Chloë and Jason Roweth with Jim McWhinnie (2009) (CD)
- Collector – Collector (2009) (CD)
- The Game is Getting Lively: Songs of the Weddin Mountains Bushrangers – Collector (2010) (CD)
- Sing us another one! Live at Humph Hall – Chloë and Jason Roweth with Loosely Woven (DVD/CD)
- Battlers' Ballad Live at Humph Hall – Chloë and Jason Roweth with Bill Browne (2 DVDs, 2 CDs)
- "That's Not How I Heard It..." – Jason Roweth with Chloë Roweth (2014) (CD)
- Too Many Bloody Songs About Shearers By Far! Vol. 1 – Chloë and Jason Roweth (2015) (CD)
- Light Another Fire – Chloë and Jason Roweth (2015) ( 2 CDs)
- The Roar of the Crowd – Chloë and Jason Roweth (2017) (2 CDs)
- The Soul of a Poet - Songs and Poems of Henry Lawson – Chloë and Jason Roweth with Liz Frencham (2018) (CD)
