= Bill Browne =

Australian rules footballer (1902–1948)

Personal information
- Full name: William Edward Browne
- Born: 19 March 1902; Port Melbourne, Victoria
- Died: 22 August 1948 (aged 46); St Kilda, Victoria
- Height: 184 cm (6 ft 0 in)
- Weight: 86 kg (190 lb)

Playing career^{1}
| Years | Club | Games (Goals) |
| 1925 | South Melbourne | 2 (2) |
| 1928 | Hawthorn | 5 (0) |
| Total | | 7 (2) |
- ^{1} Playing statistics correct to the end of 1928.

William Edward Browne (19 March 1902 – 22 August 1948) was an Australian rules footballer who played with South Melbourne and Hawthorn in the Victorian Football League (VFL).
