= Bacchus Marsh Express =

Former newspaper in Victoria, Australia

The Bacchus Marsh Express was a weekly newspaper in Victoria, Australia, founded by George Lane, and first published in July 1866. From October 1866, the paper was published by Christopher Crisp and George Lane, with Crisp acting as editor, and Lane as the printer.

The paper later became known as The Bacchus Marsh express and general advertiser for Ballan, Melton, Myrniong, Blackwood, Gisborne, Egerton and Gordon districts after absorbing the Melton and Braybrook Advertiser, the Werribee Advertiser and the Bacchus Marsh Advertiser. The publication ceased when purchased by Fairfax in 1983.
