= Reedy River (musical) =

- Music: various
- Lyrics: various
- Book: Dick Diamond
- Productions: Melbourne New Theatre 1953; Sydney New Theatre 1953

Reedy River is a 1953 Australian folk musical about the 1891 Australian shearers' strike. The libretto was written by Dick Diamond with songs chosen by John Gray. Two new songs were written for the musical by Diamond with music by Miles Maxwell.

== Background ==
The musical was previewed in 1952 in Melbourne.

== Production history ==
The play premiered at the Melbourne New Theatre on 11 March 1953. The Sydney production featured a band, The Bushwhackers, instead of an orchestra. Reedy River played throughout Australia over three years, was seen by over 450,000 people during its first run, and has been revived several times. Contemporary reviews were mixed. London's Unity Theatre mounted a production in 1954, describing it as "the working man's Oklahoma". Musical direction was by John Hasted.

== Selected songs ==
- "Widgeegoweera Joe"
- "Reedy Lagoon"
- "Banks of the Condamine"
- "Old Black Billy"
- "Reedy River"
- "Eumerella Shore"
- "Click Go the Shears"
- "Four Little Johnny cakes" composed by Louis Lavater

These songs were issued on an Australian 10" LP Diaphon DPR-8 in the mid 1950s. A further song "Ballad of 91" was also included on the record.
