= Bush band =

Group of musicians that play Australian bush ballads

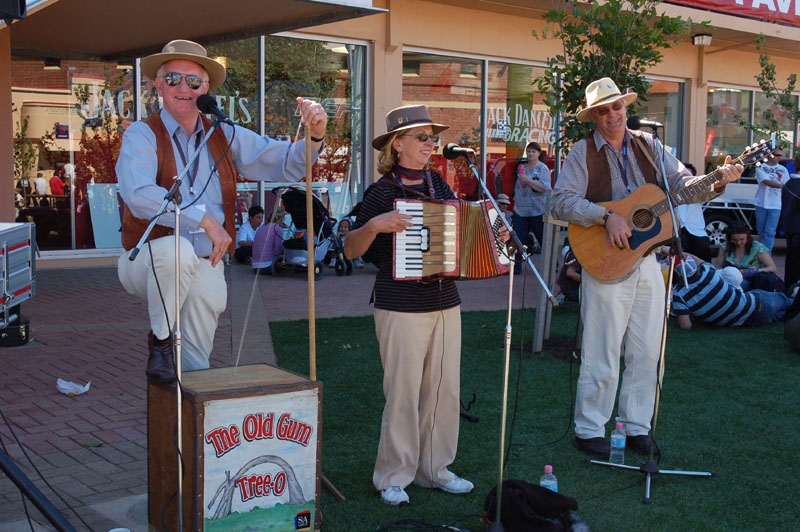
The Old Gum Tree-O, a three-piece bush band based in Adelaide, South Australia

A bush band is a group of musicians that play Australian bush ballads. A similar bush band tradition is also found in New Zealand.

== Instruments ==
In addition to vocals, instruments featured in bush bands may include fiddle, accordion, guitar, banjo, mandolin, concertina, harmonica, lagerphone, bush bass (tea chest bass) or double bass, tin whistle, and bodhrán. Less common are the piano, bones, barcoo dog (a sheep herding tool used as a sistrum), spoons, and musical saw. Although not traditional, electric bass guitar or electric guitar have occasionally been used since the 1970s.

== Repertoire and function ==
Bush bands play music for bush dances, in which the dance program is usually based on dances known to have been danced in Australia from colonial times to the folk revival in the 1950s. Contemporary dances, set in the traditional style, are also featured at bush dances.

Some popular traditional bush dances are Stockyards, Haymaker's Jig, Galopede, Brown Jug Polka, Virginia Reel and barn dance. Popular contemporary bush dances include Blackwattle Reel, Jubilee Jig, CHOGM Pentrille, Knocking Down His Cheque and Midnight Schottische.

Bush bands also play bush ballads, many of which date to the 19th century. Among the most notable bush lyricists was the poet Banjo Paterson (1864–1941).

The Bush Music Club, based in Sydney, New South Wales, Australia, hold regular bush dances and Colonial Balls where bush bands perform.

== Origin ==
Bush bands, as currently formulated, experienced a revival in 1953 with the musical play Reedy River, which was first produced and published by the New Theatre (Sydney) and most recently produced in 2002. Written by Dick Diamond, the musical featured twelve or so Australian songs, which included Doreen Jacobs' setting of Helen Palmer's "Ballad of 1891," as well as the title song, Chris Kempster's setting of Lawson's "Reedy River." The backing band for this popular stage production was "The Bushwhackers", who had formed a year earlier in 1952. As the musical was performed in Brisbane and other Australian cities, local "bush bands" modeled on the Sydney group, such as Brisbane's "The Moreton Bay Bushwhackers," sprang up in each place; many of these remained together following the closing of the musical, and spawned other, similar groups.

== Contemporary bush bands ==
Perhaps the best known bush band internationally, albeit in their later years with the influence of English folk rock bands like Fairport Convention and Steeleye Span, was the Bushwackers (spelt without the "h" as in the earlier Bushwhackers Band of the 1950s), who formed in Melbourne in 1971 and were active to 1984. The "Wackers," as they are known by their fans, toured around the world and with their larrikin, outgoing style, song books, dance instruction books and records, contributed markedly to the spread of bush music and dancing, especially in Australia. Their style was infused with Celtic music (i.e. reels and jigs) to a greater extent than previous bush bands, and they used an electric bass guitar in place of the more traditional bush bass. The period leading up to and following Australia's Bicentenary, 1988, saw a marked resurgence in bush music and bush dances that lasted for many years.

Many bands also bearing the rock influence and adding original music rode this Australiana wave. Examples are the Ants Bush Band, Eureka!, Skewiff, Rantan Bush Band and Bullamakanka and some bands, including the Bushwackers, still perform on an occasional basis.

In recent years, the emergence of bands such as The Currency (Melbourne), The Handsome Young Strangers (Sydney) Jack Flash (South Queensland) and Sydney City Trash (Sydney) has moved bush music into rock and roll venues and major festival stages, with a blended style that includes rock drums and guitars whilst combining with Celtic influences. The Handsome Young Strangers lean more towards the traditional style of bands such as The Bushwackers, whilst The Currency, Jack Flash and Sydney City Trash incorporate both punk and Celtic styles.

== List of notable bush bands ==
=== Australia ===
- The Bushwackers, established 1971 (Melbourne, Victoria)
- The Cobbers Bush Band, established 1968 (Melbourne, Victoria)
- Franklyn B Paverty, established 1970 (Canberra and the region around the Australian Capital Territory)
- Mucky Duck Bush Band, established 1974 (Perth, Western Australia)
- The Sundowners, established 1977 (Melbourne, Victoria)
- The Tin Shed Rattlers established 1971 and still very active today (Wagga Wagga, New South Wales).
- Wild Matildas Bush Band established 1994 (Adelaide, South Australia)

=== New Zealand ===
- The Big Muffin Serious Band
- The Pioneer Pog 'n' Scroggin Bush Band

== See also ==
- Australian folk music
- Bush dance
- Skiffle bands
- Warren Fahey, folklore collector and performer of Australian traditional music
