= John Dengate =

Australian folk singer and songwriter

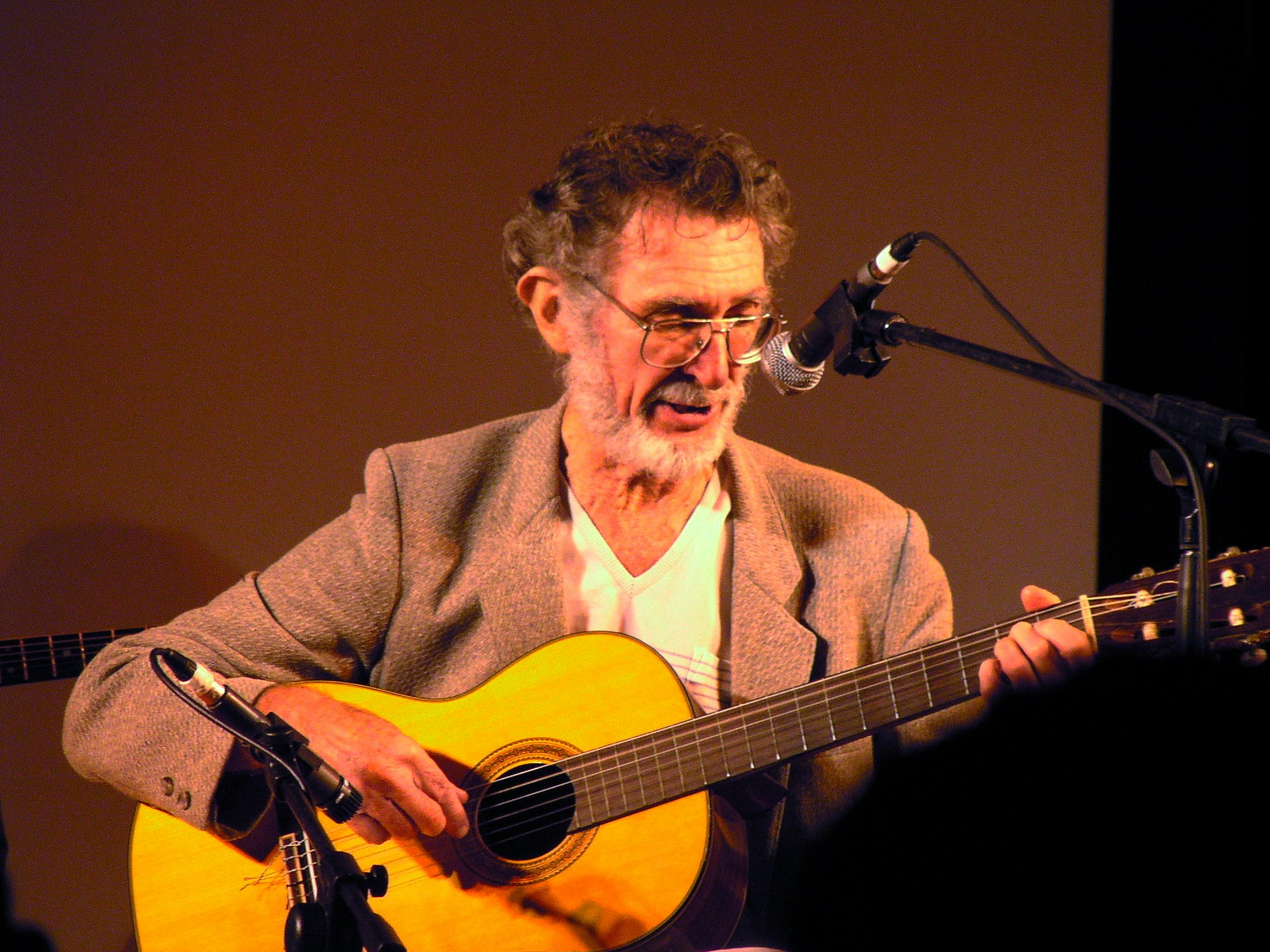
- John Dengate on stage at the 2004 National Folk Festival in Canberra

Background information
- Born: John Robert Dengate; 1 October 1938; Carlingford, New South Wales, Australia
- Died: 1 August 2013 (aged 74) Glebe, New South Wales, Australia
- Genres: Folk music, Satire
- Occupations: Musician, singer-songwriter
- Instruments: Vocals, guitar, tin whistle
- Years active: 1963–2013
- Website: John Dengate Homepage - Shoestring Records

John Dengate (1 October 1938 – 1 August 2013) was an Australian folk singer and songwriter. His songs, mostly but not exclusively humorous and satirical have been recorded by performers including Declan Affley, John Warner, Margaret Walters and Doug Jenner. In addition, he appeared on a number of recorded collections and produced a two-volume CD, 'Australian Son' on the Shoestring label. He made numerous appearances at folk concerts and festivals including the National Folk Festival.
