= The Bushwackers (band) =

Australian folk and country music band

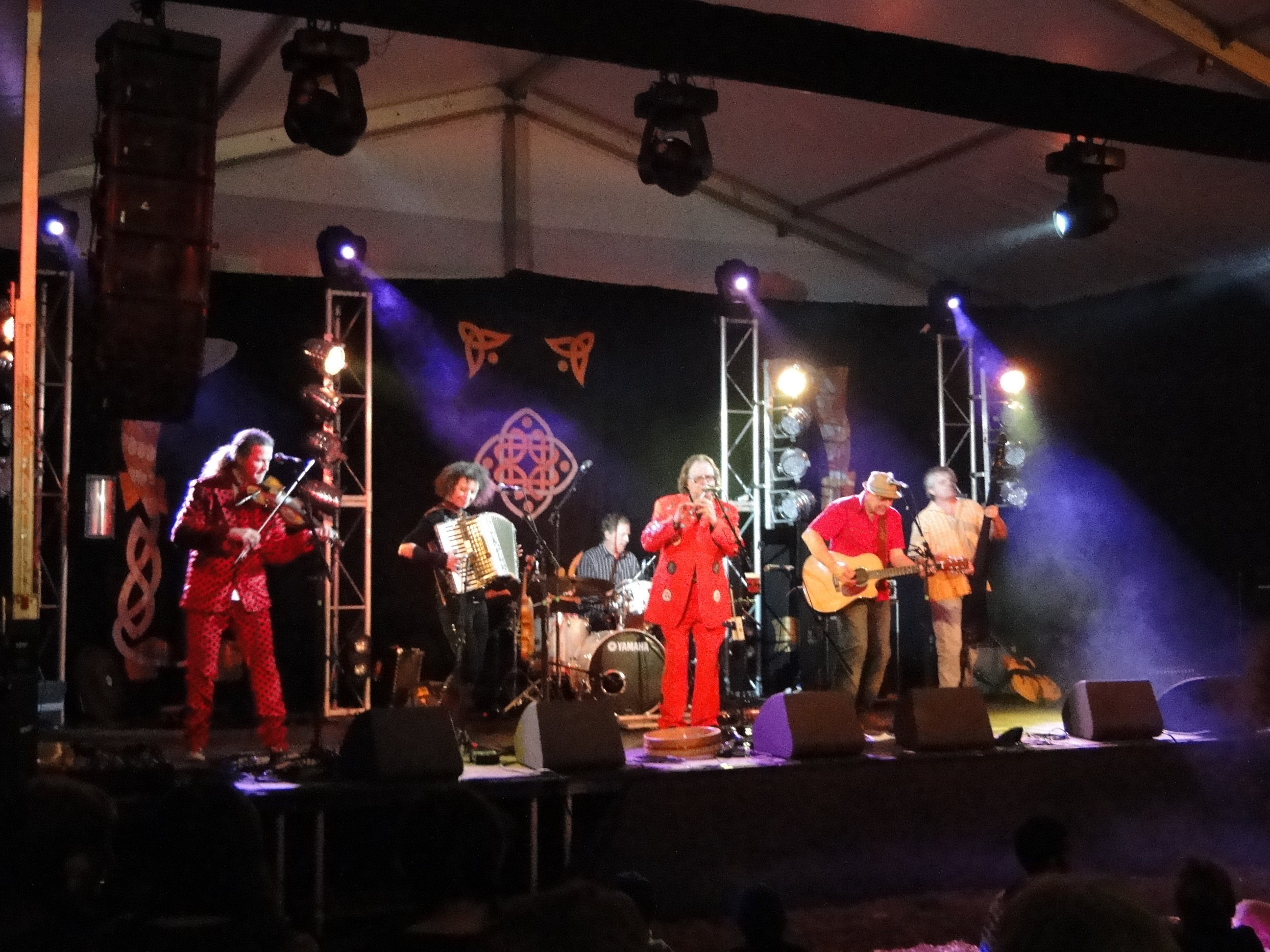
- The Bushwackers at the 2010 National Celtic Festival, Portarlington, Victoria, Australia

Background information
- Also known as: The Original Bushwhackers and Bullockies Bush Band; the Bushwackers Band; the Range Rovers
- Origin: Melbourne, Victoria, Australia
- Genres: Bush band, Australian country
- Years active: 1971–present
- Labels: Larrikin; Image; Avenue; CBS; Astor; ABC/EMI
- Members: Dobe Newton; Roger Corbett; Clare O'Meara; Sarah Bussutil-Palmer; Silas Palmer; Rory Phillips; Dave Roberts; Michael Vidale; Declan O’Neill; Tony O’Neill; Josh Beveridge; Cait Jamieson; Ali Foster; Doug Gallacher; Peter Keown; Ben Corbett
- Website: thebushwackers.com.au

The Bushwackers Band, often simply the Bushwackers, are an Australian folk and country music band or bush band founded in 1970. Their cover version of "And the Band Played Waltzing Matilda" (1976) was listed in the APRA Top 30 Australian songs in 2001, alongside its writer Eric Bogle's 1980 rendition. Their top 60 studio albums on the Australian Kent Music Report are Bushfire (1978), Dance Album (1980), Faces in the Street and Beneath the Southern Cross (both 1981).

== History ==
The Bushwackers Band were formed as the Original Bushwhackers and Bullockies Bush Band in 1971 in Melbourne by Dave Isom on guitar, banjo, vocals and mandolin; Bert Kahanoff on lagerphone and vocals; and Jan Wositzky on vocals, harmonica, banjo and percussion. Isom had started the La Trobe University Folk Club in 1969 and saw a concert by the Wild Colonial Boys at The Assembly Hall, Melbourne, with Kahanoff. Isom was inspired to form his own group, its name derives from a recording, Bullockies, Bushwhackers and Booze (1967) by various artists including Martyn Wyndham-Read, Peter Dickie and Jim Buchanan. Early gigs were in October 1971 by the trio who were later joined by various players, including Mick Slocum on accordion, concertina and vocals; and fiddlers Tony Hunt and Dave Kidd. Their debut album, The Shearers Dream, appeared in 1974 via Picture Records with the line-up of Hunt, Isom, Slocum and Wositsky joined by Dobe Newton on lagerphone, whistle and vocals.

The ensemble shortened their name to the Bushwackers Band and went full-time with their first tour to the United Kingdom. With an ever-changing line-up, and adding tin whistle, harmonica, concertina, 5-string banjo, bodhrán, bones, spoons, electric bass and guitar and drums the band worked throughout Australia and Europe. Their second album, And the Band Played Waltzing Matilda (1976), had Pete Howell on bass guitar joining the line-up of Hunt, Kidd, Newton, Slocum and Wositzky. It featured their cover version of the title song, which was written by Scottish-born Eric Bogle. "And the Band Played Waltzing Matilda" by the Bushwackers Band, alongside Bogle's 1980 rendition, was listed as one of the APRA Top 30 Australian songs in 2001 as part of the celebrations for the Australasian Performing Right Association (APRA)'s 75th anniversary.

Their fourth studio album, Bushfire (1978), was produced by John Wood for Image Records and peaked at No. 37 on the Kent Music Report albums chart. By 1979 the line-up was Newton, Slocum and Wositsky joined by Steve Groves on vocals and guitar, Fred Kuhnl on vocals, bass guitar and moog and Gregory Martin on drums and percussion. The Bushwackers' fifth studio album, Dance Album (1980) used the line-up of Martin and Newton with Andy Colville on electric guitar, Roger Corbett on electric bass, Michael Harris on fiddle and viola, Louis McManus on fiddle, mandolin and acoustic guitar and Bill Smith on harmonica, bones, spoons, axes, bodhrán and cross-cut saw. The album peaked at No. 35 – the group's highest placing. Corbett became the group's principal songwriter, record producer and talent manager.

In 1981 they released two top 60 studio albums, Faces in the Street and Beneath the Southern Cross. By the following year the line-up of Corbett, Newton and McManus were joined by Danny Bourke on fiddle and vocals, Tommy Emmanuel on guitar and vocals (ex-the Southern Star Band, Goldrush) and Freddie Strauks on drums (ex-Skyhooks, the Sports). McManus was replaced by Tony O'Neill on mandolin, guitar and vocals and Harris rejoined in 1983 while Strauks was replaced on drums by Robbie Ross (ex-Goanna).

In 1984 Newton disbanded the group except for reunion shows. The ABC's A Big Country aired a documentary special titled The Last Dance that year.

In 1987 he co-wrote "I Am Australian" with Bruce Woodley of the Seekers. In 1993 Newton and Corbet reformed the Bushwackers Band (initially as the Range Rovers) with Pete Drummond (later with Dragon) on drums, Michael Fix on guitar (ex-Hat Trick), Mark Oats on fiddle and Melanie Williamson on piano accordion, guitar and vocals. Fix was soon replaced by Peter Malone on guitar, who was replaced in turn by Brad Johns and then Tim Gaze by 1995. Other members have included David Brannigan (The Colinails), Dave Mattacks, Pat Drummond, Eddy van Roosendael.

In August 2023, Newton and Corbett, performed a rendition of "I Am Australian", in their audition on the twelfth season of The Voice Australia, in which they received a four-chair turn before securing a place on coach Jessica Mauboy's team.

== Members (Not a complete list) ==
=== 1970s ===
- Dave Isom – guitar, banjo, vocals, mandolin (1970–1976)
- Bert Kahanoff – lagerphone (1970–1976)
- Sylvester Kroyher – Fiddle (1971–72)
- John Spencer – Banjo, Mandolin (1971–72)
- Jan Wositzky a.k.a. Bill Smith – vocals, harmonica, banjo, percussion, bodhrán, spoons, bush bass, bones, axes, cross-cut saw (1971–1980)
- John Millard – Whistle, Flute (1972–73)
- Mick Slocum – accordion, concertina, vocals (fl. 1971–1979)
- Dave Kidd – fiddle (fl. 1971–73, 1976–78)
- Tony Hunt – fiddle, viola, banjo (fl. 1973–1976)
- Dobe Newton – lagerphone, whistle, vocals, side-drum, cross-cut saw (1973–present)
- Peter Howell – bass guitar (fl. 1974–76)
- Dave Brannigan – Guitar (1975)
- Louis McManus – fiddle, guitar, mandolin, acoustic guitar (fl. 1976–78, 1980–84)
- Pete Farndon – bass guitar (fl. 1976–78, died 1983)
- Dave Mattacks – Drums (UK 1976)
- John Fitzgerald – Guitar, fiddle (1977)
- Chris Duffy – guitar (fl. 1978)
- Hugh McDonald – Bass, guitar (1978)
- Jim Fisher – Guitar (1978–79)
- Doug Gallagher – Drums (1978 to present)
- Fred Kuhnl – vocals, bass guitar, moog (fl. 1979)
- Gregory Martin – drums, percussion (fl. 1979–1980)
- Steve Groves – vocals, guitar (fl. 1979)
- Michael Harris – fiddle, viola (fl. 1979–82, 1984)
- Andy Colville – electric guitar (fl. 1979–80)

=== 1980s ===
- Roger Corbett – electric bass, vocals (1980–present)
- Eddie van Rosendael – Drums (1980–81)
- Freddie Strauks – drums (fl. 1982–83)
- Tony O'Neill – mandolin, guitar, vocals (fl. 1982–83, 1985, 2006, 2012–present)
- Tommy Emmanuel – guitar and vocals (fl. 1982)
- Robbie Ross – drums (fl. 1983)
- Danny Bourke – fiddle, vocals (fl. 1982)
- Michael Fix – guitar (fl. 1993)
- Mario Gregorie – Keyboards (1984)
- Peter Northcote – Guitar (1985)
- Des McKenna – Drums (1986)
- Mick Hyder – Fiddle (1986)
- Pete Keown – Drums (1986–87, 2022–23)
- Steve Fearnley – Drums (1987–88)
- Spiro Phillipas – Bass (1985)
- Phil Emmanuel – Guitar (1987)
- Brendan O’Shea – Bass (1987)
- Pat Drummond – Guitar (1987)
- Simon Patterson – Guitar (1988)
- Bob Donaldson – Drum (1989–91)

=== 1990s ===
- Melanie Williamson – piano accordion, guitar, vocals (fl. 1993–98)
- Mark Oats – fiddle (fl. 1993–2020)
- Steve Housden – Guitar (1993–94)
- Pete Drummond – drums (fl. 1993–2002)
- Peter Malone – guitar (fl. 1994–95)
- Brad Johns – guitar (fl. 1995–96)
- Guy Dutton – Guitar
- Tim Gaze – guitar (fl. 1995–2002)
- Dave O’Neill – Fiddle (1996–97)
- Hanuman Das – Bass (1997)
- Willie Kwa – Drums (1998)
- Pamela Drysdale – Accordion, Vocals (1998–2002)
- Mike Kerin – Fiddle (1999)

=== 2000s ===
- Andrew Clermont – Fiddle (2002)
- Clare O’Meara – Fiddle, Accordion (2002–present)
- Matt Hanley – Guitar (2003)
- Justin Duggan – Drums (2003–2008)
- Duncan Toombs – Guitar (2003–05)
- Michael Vidale – Bass (2005–present)
- Brad Bergen – Drums (2005, 2006, 2007, 2010, 2011)
- Mark Miller – Bass (US 2006)
- Rick Shell – Drums (US 2006)
- Ben Corbett – Guitar, Bass (2007–present)
- Gary Steel – Accordion (2007)
- Adrian Cannon – Drums (2009)

=== 2010s ===
- David Hicks – Drums (2010)
- Declan O’Neill – Drums (2010–present)
- Brad Bergen – Drums (2011)
- Andy Gatus – Drums (2012–2019)
- Sarah Bussitil-Palmer – Fiddle (2016–present)
- Silas Palmer – Fiddle, Accordion (2016–present)
- Sue Carson – Fiddle (2017–2019)
- Liam Kennedy-Clark – Bass, Electric Guitar (2017–2024)
- Oscar Lupuczuk – Bass (2017–2020)
- Dave Roberts – Drums (2014–present)
- Gabi Louise – Fiddle (2018–2024)
- Ben Conciella – Bass (2019)
- Rory Phillips – Bass, Electric Guitar (2019–present)

=== 2020s ===
- Josh Beveridge – Bass (2025–present)
- Cait Jamieson – Fiddle (2025–present)

== Discography ==
=== Studio albums ===
List of albums, with selected chart positions
Title	Album details	Peak chart positions
Title	Album details	AUS
The Shearer's Dream	Released: 1974; Format: LP; Label: Rainbow Records (PRF 1007)	-
And the Band Played Waltzing Matilda	Released: 1976; Format: LP; Label: Image Records (ILP 753)	-
Murrumbidgee	Released: 1977; Format: LP; Label: Image Records (ILP 776)	-
Bushfire	Released: 1978; Format: LP; Label: Image Records (ILP 806)	37
Dance Album	Released: May 1980; Format: LP; Label: Image Records (ILP 815)	35
Faces in the Street	Released: April 1981; Format: LP; Label: Avenue Records (L 37585)	54
Beneath the Southern Cross	Released: October 1981; Format: LP, Cass; Label: Telmak (TMAK 043)	57
Down There for Dancing	Released: November 1982; Format: LP, Cass; Label: CBS (SBP 237825)	97
Warrigal Morning	Released: 1983; Format: LP, Cass; Label: CBS (SBP 237975); Note: Music for the film Bush Christmas	-
Billy of Tea	Released: 1994; Format: CD; Label:	-
Oz Rock Salutes	Released: 1997; Format: CD; Label: ABC Music (742382106326)	-
No Nuts 'Til Monday	Released: 1998; Format: CD; Label:	-
Australian Songbook 30th Anniversary Edition	Released: 2001; Format: CD; Label: The Bushwackers (BW002); New Recordings	-
Ned	Released: January 2005; Format: CD, DD; Label: The Bushwackers ()	-
Australian Songbook Volume 2	Released: 2009; Format: CD, DD; Label: The Bushwackers (BW006)	-
The Official Dance Album	Released: 2011; Format: 2x CD; Label: The Bushwackers (BW009)	-
Australian Songbook Volume 3	Released: 18 January 2013; Format: CD, DD; Label: The Bushwackers ()	-
The Lawson Project (with Dobe Newton)	Released: 4 March 2013; Format: 2x CD, DD, streaming; Label: Dobe Newton	-
The Hungry Mile	Released: 24 March 2017; Format: CD, DD, streaming; Label: The Bushwackers (BW011)	-
Dyed the Wool	Released: 10 January 2020; Format: CD, DD, streaming; Label: The Bushwackers (BW012)	-

=== Live albums ===
List of albums, with selected chart positions
Title	Album details	Peak chart positions
Title	Album details	AUS
Lively!	Released: 1984; Format: LP, Cass; Label: CBS (SBP 238004)	94
Jubilee 25th Anniversary Concert	Released: 1996; Format: CD; Label: EMI Music Group (4892832)	-

=== Compilation albums ===
List of albums, with selected chart positions
Title	Album details	Peak chart positions
Title	Album details	AUS
The Bushwackers Collection	Released: 1982; Format: LP, Cass; Label: Avenue Records (L 37821)	-
Waltzing Matilda	Released: 1984; Format: LP, Cass; Label: J&B Records (JB 195)	43
Celebration	Released: 1988; Format: 2xLP; Label: CBS (460860 1)	-
The Very Best of Redgum & The Bushwackers Band (with Redgum)	Released: July 1990; Format: CD, Cass; Label: J&B Records (JB415)	61
So Far... 1974–1994	Released: 1994; Format: 2xCD; Label: EMI (4797782)	-
The Great Bushwackers Band	Released: 2002; Format: 3xCD; Label: Rajon (R0011)	-
The Very Best of the Bushwackers	Released: 2008; Format: 2xCD; Label: MasterSong (580822)	-
Australian Songbook Collection	Released: January 2013; Format: 3xCD, DD; Label: The Bushwackers (BW0010); Features Australian Songbook Collection volumes 1,2&3	-

=== Extended plays ===
List of EP, with selected chart positions
Title	Details
Original T.V. Themes (with Brian May and The ABC Showband)	Released: 1975; Format: LP; Label: Image (IEP-3)
Shores of Botany Bay	Released: 1976; Format: LP; Label: Image (IEP-5)
Bushwacked	Released: 1995; Format: CD; Label: ABC
April 25	Released: 2006; Format: CD, DD; Label: The Bushwackers (BW004)

=== Singles ===
List of singles, with selected chart positions
Year	Title	Peak chart positions	Album
Year	Title	AUS	Album
1973	"When the Rain Tumbles Down in July"/"instrumental	-	
1979	"Annie"/"Fanny Bay"	-	Bushfire
1980	"Flying Pieman"/"The Kangaroo Hop"	-	The Dance Album
1980	"Waves of Bondi"/"Flying Pieman"	-	The Dance Album
1981	"Les Darcy"/"Weevils in the Flour"	-	Faces in the Street
1981	"Marijuana Australia"/"Ned Kelly's Tunes"	77	Faces in the Street
1982	"Waltzing Matilda"/"Beneath the Southern Cross"	-	Beneath The Southern Cross
1982	"1234"/"Coney Island"	-	Down There for Dancing
1983	"Warrigal Morning" (Theme from Bush Christmas)/"Goanna Stew"	-	Warrigal Morning
1983	"When Britannia Ruled the Waves"/"Hanging Rock"	-	Lively!
1984	"Lime Juice Tub"/"Marijunana Australia"	-	Lively!
1989	"Shoalhaven Man"/"The Butterfly"	-	non-album single
1996	"Battler's Ballad" (with Broderick Smith)	-	non-album single
2016	"Leave it in the Ground"	-	The Hungry Mile
2017	"Another Trip to Bunnings"	-	The Hungry Mile
2018	"Oh How Memories Have Flown"	-	non-album single
2019	"Stroke the Government's Pen" (with James Stewart Keene)	-	non-album single
2019	"Marijuana Australiana Rehashed"	-	Dyed the Wool

== Awards and nominations ==
=== Country Music Awards of Australia ===
The Country Music Awards of Australia (also known as the Golden Guitar Awards and originally named Australasian Country Music Awards) is an annual awards night held in January during the Tamworth Country Music Festival, in Tamworth, New South Wales, celebrating recording excellence in the Australian country music industry. The Bushwackers have won three awards (wins only).

Year	Nominee / work	Award	Result
1981	"Flying Pieman"	Instrumental of the Year	Won
2010	"The Road to Thargomindah" (written by Colin Buchanan)	Bush Ballad of the Year	Won
2012	"I Am Australian"	Heritage Track of the Year	Won
2022	The Bushwackers	Australian Roll of Renown	inducted

=== Mo Awards ===
The Australian Entertainment Mo Awards (commonly known informally as the Mo Awards), were annual Australian entertainment industry awards. They recognise achievements in live entertainment in Australia from 1975 to 2016. The Bushwackers have won three awards (wins only).

Year	Nominee / work	Award	Result
1983	Themselves	Best Country Group	Won
1986	Themselves	Best Country Group	Won
1988	Themselves	Best Country Group	Won
