= Dick Diamond =

Australian writer (1906–1989)

Richard Frank Diamond (27 July 1906 – 9 February 1989), better known as Dick Diamond, was an Australian writer best known for Reedy River.

Diamond was born in England and migrated to Australia in 1914. He wrote plays, scripts and revues and worked as a journalist. He worked in Vietnam and China and was a member of the Communist Party of Australia.

In 1945 he was secretary of the Victorian Actors' Equity union, and state secretary of the Actors and Announcers Equity Association of Australia. He was part of the protest against British and US transcripts flooding Australian radio and bringing a "threat to the further development of our national culture and artistic talent", and limiting the number of overseas actors working in Australia.

Diamond was mentioned in the Royal Commission Inquiring into the Origins, Aims, Objects and Funds of the Communist Party in Victoria and Other Related Matters, as having incorrect record of employment and experience.

== Select works ==
- Soak the Rich (1941), play
- Jack the Giant Killer (1947), pantomime, with lyrics and music by Mat Nemenoff, which began a three-week run in December. It featured a dame, a fairy queen, and referenced the capitalist system.
- Reedy River (1953), musical
- Under the Coolibah Tree (1955), musical
- The Walls are Down (1958), book, a collection of short stories of character sketches of Vietnamese people.
