= Frontline (album) =

Studio album by Redgum
- Released: June 1984
- Studio: Richmond Recorders, Melbourne
- Genre: Folk, Rock
- Length: 44:57
- Label: Epic
- Producer: Trevor Lucas

Redgum chronology
Caught in the Act (1983)	Frontline (1984)	Anything's Legal, Anything Goes (1984)

Frontline is the fourth studio album by the Australian folk-rock group Redgum. It was the last album that John Schumann performed on before he left the group at the end of 1985.

== Track listing ==
Side 1
No.	Title	Writer(s)	Length
1.	"I've Been to Bali Too"	John Schumann	3:47
2.	"A.S.I.O."	Michael Atkinson	4:16
3.	"Friday Night"	Atkinson	3:08
4.	"Spirit of the Land"	Hugh McDonald	4:57
5.	"Gladstone Pier"	Atkinson	7:46

Side 2
No.	Title	Writer(s)	Length
1.	"Spark of the Heart"	Atkinson	4:33
2.	"Still Life"	McDonald, Verity Truman	3:44
3.	"Working Girls"	Schumann	4:40
4.	"Beyond Reason"	Schumann	4:41
5.	"Hira (Diamond of the Dawn)"	Stephen Cooney	3:30
Total length:			44:58

== Personnel ==
The Band

- Michael Atkinson – vocals, guitar
- Hugh McDonald – acoustic and electric guitars, violin, vocals
- John Schumann – vocals, acoustic guitar
- Verity Truman – saxophone, flute, vocals
- Stephen Cooney - bass, didgeridoo, guitar, mandolin, banjo, vocals
- Brian Czempinski - drums
- Michael Spicer - piano, keyboards

Guests

- Mick O'Connor - Hammond organ
- Michael Harris - violin
- Dobe Newton - lagerphone
- Wilbur Wilde - saxophone
- Bill Harrower - saxophone, alto flute
- Trevor Lucas - guitar
- Greg Sheehan - percussion
- Tim Fetters - trumpet

Technical

- Trevor Lucas - producer
- Tony Buettel - engineer
- Richmond Recorders - recording studio
- Music Farm Studios - mixing studio

Design

- A&L Barnum Graphic Design, CBS Art Studio - artwork
- Ron Bell, The Age - front cover photography
- The Age, Peter Dombrovskis, Greg Noakes - back cover photography
- Stuart Fox - insert photography

== Charts ==
Chart (1984)	Position
Australia (Kent Music Report)	18
