= Virgin Ground =

Studio album by Redgum
- Released: 1980
- Recorded: Richmond Recorders, Melbourne & Pepper Studios, Adelaide
- Genre: Folk
- Length: 32:36
- Label: Epic
- Producer: Mark Boath, Redgum

Redgum chronology
| If You Don't Fight You Lose (1978) | Virgin Ground (1980) | Brown Rice and Kerosine (1981) |

Virgin Ground is the second album by Redgum. The title is taken from the first track.

It was originally released on vinyl and cassette. It was available on CD between 1990 and 1992, and has been out of print ever since, although some tracks were included on the 2004 collection Against the Grain.

The band were all working day jobs during recording. They would fly from Adelaide to Melbourne on a Friday, play a gig to pay for the trip, and then record all weekend." This album led to the band becoming more popular and becoming full-time musicians.

The title track tells the story of the New Australia Colony established in Paraguay in 1893 by a group of Australians led by William Lane, seeking a fresh start on "virgin ground" to establish a utopian society. Other tracks offer bleak insight into current social issues including chronic unemployment, the plight of migrant women, foreign domination of Australian business and government, and the apathy of 'middle Australia'. "Women in Change" features the last 4 stanzas from Lesbia Harford's poem "Periodicity", commenting on a woman's menstrual cycle.

== Track listing ==
Side A

1. "Virgin Ground" (M. Atkinson)
2. "Maria" (M. Atkinson)
3. "Stewie" (J. Schumann)
4. "Domination Quickstep" (V. Truman)
5. "The Money's No Good" (M. Atkinson/J. Schumann)

Side B

1. "Nuclear Cop" (M. Atkinson/J. Schumann/V. Truman/C. Timms)
2. "Women in Change" (V. Truman/L. Harford)
3. "Ted" (M. Atkinson)
4. "It Doesn't Matter to Me" (M. Atkinson/J. Schumann)
5. "Long Run" (J. Schumann)

== Personnel ==
- Michael Atkinson - vocals, electric and acoustic guitars, piano, mandolin
- John Schumann - lead vocals, acoustic guitar
- Verity Truman - vocals, flute, tin whistle, recorder, alto saxophone
- Chris Timms - vocals, violin

Additional musicians

- Dave Flett - bass on "Virgin Ground", "Nuclear Cop", "Ted" and "It Doesn't Matter to Me"
- Gordon McLean - drums on "Virgin Ground", "Nuclear Cop", "Ted" and "It Doesn't Matter to Me"
- Chris Boath - bass on "Maria", "Domination Quickstep", "The Money's No Good" and "Long Run"
- Geoff Gifford - drums on "Maria", "Domination Quickstep", "The Money's No Good" and "Long Run"
- Bronwyn Tupper - cello on "Stewie"

Technical personnel

- Produced by Mark Boath and Redgum
- Engineered by Mark Boath
- Cover painting by George Alridge
- Band photography by Grant Mathews
- Layout & design by Geoff Gifford
- Coordinated by Christopher Gunn

== Charts ==
| Chart (1980/81) | Position |
|---|---|
| Australia (Kent Music Report) | 53 |
