= Behind the Lines (John Schumann album) =

Studio album by John Schumann
- Released: August 2008
- Recorded: November 2007 – April 2008 at Hugh McDonald Studios, Kew
- Genre: Folk
- Label: ABC Music
- Producers: John Schumann, Hugh McDonald

John Schumann chronology
Lawson (2005)	Behind the Lines (2008)

Behind the Lines is the second album by John Schumann and the Vagabond Crew. Released in 2008, it was re-released in 2011.

It consists almost entirely of cover songs and musical renditions of poems. The album includes covers of artists and groups such as Eric Bogle, Judy Small, Cold Chisel, as well as a number of songs previously released by Schumann, either as a solo artist or during his time with Redgum.

The central theme of the album is Australians at war, although it also includes the iconic Australian song Waltzing Matilda, and "To An Old Mate", a Henry Lawson poem not specifically about war, which was also included on the Lawson album.

== Album artwork ==
The cover art shows a picture of an Australian First World War era soldier in a barracks, reading a book or a letter.

== Track listing ==
(original artists in parentheses)

1. "Boy on the Run" (The Dingoes) – 3:47
2. "And The Band Played Waltzing Matilda" (Eric Bogle) – 4:41
3. "Scots of the Riverina" (Henry Lawson) – 4:07
4. "No Man's Land (The Green Fields of France)" (Eric Bogle) – 5:08
5. "To An Old Mate" (Redgum) – 3:10
6. "Ted" (Redgum) – 4:13
7. "Mothers, Daughters, Wives" (Judy Small) – 4:59
8. "Khe Sanh" (Cold Chisel) – 4:25
9. "My Country" (Midnight Oil) – 4:28
10. "I Was Only Nineteen" (Redgum) – 4:46
11. "Rachel" (Raymond Froggatt)– 5:02
12. "Wings Of An Eagle" (Russell Morris) – 4:10
13. "Safe Behind The Wire" (John Schumann) - 3:36
14. "When the War Is Over" (Cold Chisel) - 4:01
15. "I'll Be Gone" (Spectrum) - 4.36
16. "Waltzing Matilda" (Banjo Paterson) - 5.11

== Personnel ==
The Vagabond Crew

- John Schumann – lead & backing vocals, acoustic guitars, percussion
- Hugh McDonald - lead & backing vocals, acoustic & electric guitars, bass, mandolin, violin, mandocello, dobro, keyboards, percussion
- Dave Folley - Drums, percussion
- Kat Kraus - lead and backing vocals
- Mark Kraus - audio

Special guests

- Rob Hirst - backing vocals
- Russell Morris - lead and backing vocals
- Mike Rudd - vocals, harmonica
- Broderick Smith - harmonica

Contributing Musicians

- Peter Anderson - accordion
- Shannon Bourne - acoustic and electric guitars
- Charlotte Dennis - cello
- Tom Kinnet - uilleann pipes, tin whistle
- Kecil Saudara - backing vocals
- Sam Willoughby - bass, backing vocals
