= Australian folk music =

Music genre

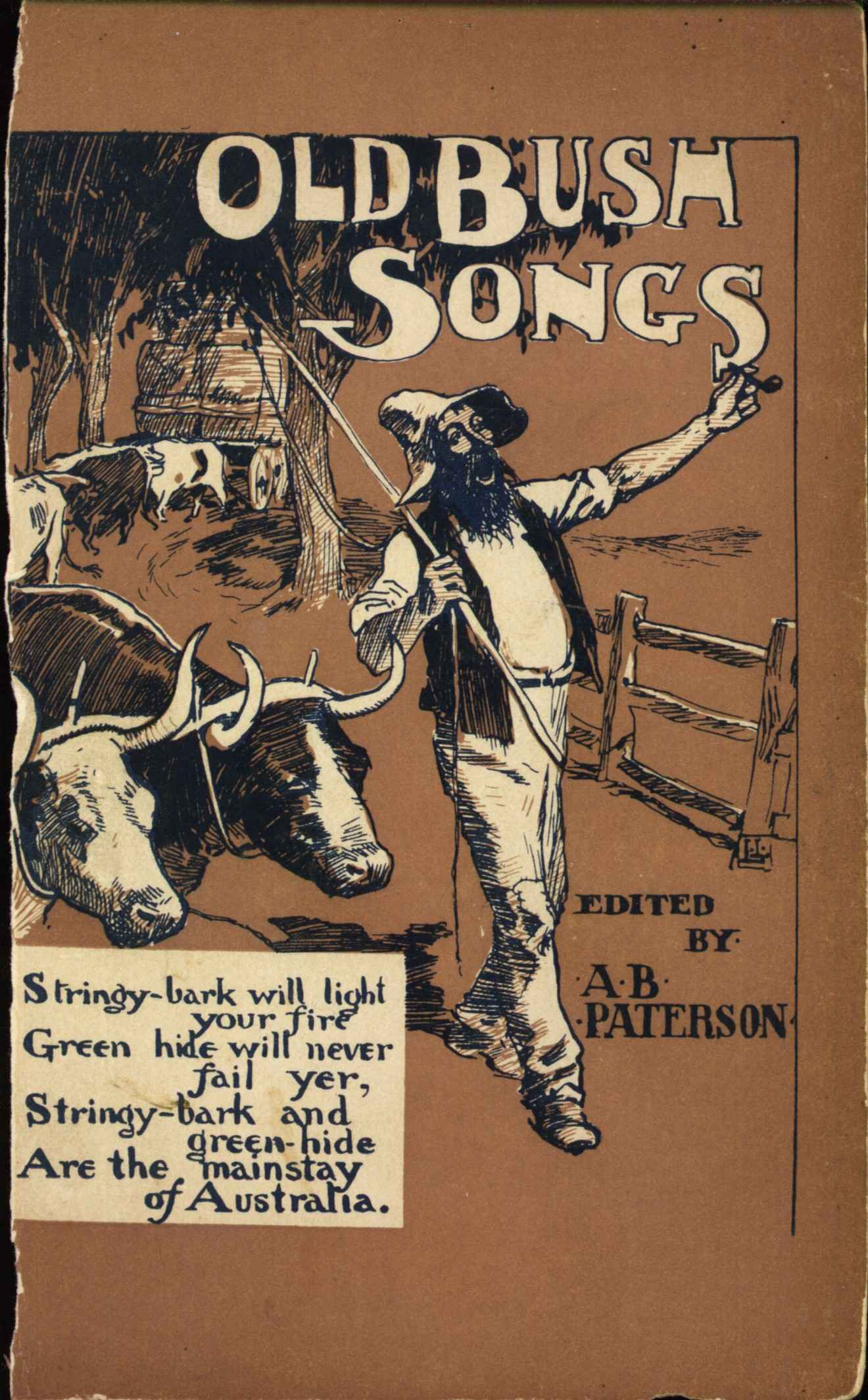
Cover to Banjo Paterson's seminal 1905 collection of bush ballads, entitled The Old Bush Songs

Australian folk music is the traditional music from the large variety of immigrant cultures and those of the original Australian inhabitants.

Celtic, English, German and Scandinavian folk traditions predominated in the first wave of European immigrant music. The Australian tradition is, in this sense, related to the traditions of other countries with similar ethnic, historical and political origins, such as New Zealand, Canada and the United States.

== Bush music ==
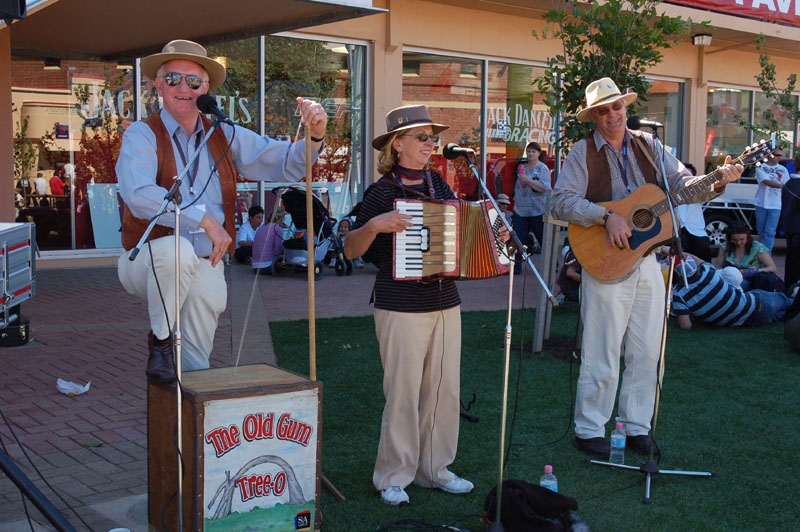
The Old Gum Tree-O, a three-piece bush band based in Adelaide, South Australia

For much of its history, Australia's bush music belonged to an oral and folkloric tradition, and was only later published in print in volumes such as Banjo Paterson's Old Bush Songs, in the 1890s. More than 70 of Banjo Paterson's poems have been set to music by Wallis & Matilda since 1980. The distinctive themes and origins of Australia's "bush music" or "bush band music" can be traced to the sea shanties of 18th and 19th century Europe and other songs sung by the convicts who were sent to Australia during the early period of the British colonisation, beginning in 1788. Early Australian ballads sing of the harsh ways of life of the epoch and of such people and events as bushrangers, swagmen, drovers, stockmen and shearers. Convict and bushranger verses often railed against government tyranny. Classic bush songs on such themes include: The Wild Colonial Boy, Click Go The Shears, The Eumeralla Shore, The Drover's Dream, The Queensland Drover, The Dying Stockman and Moreton Bay.

Later themes which endure to the present include the experiences of war, of droughts and flooding rains, of Aboriginality and of the railways and trucking routes which link Australia's distances. Isolation and loneliness of life in the Australian bush has been another theme.

Waltzing Matilda, often regarded as Australia's unofficial national anthem, is a quintessential Australian folk song, influenced by Celtic folk ballads.

Country and folk artists such as Lionel Long, Gary Shearston, Marian Henderson, Margaret Roadknight, The Bushwackers and John Schumann of the band Redgum and country artists like Tex Morton, Slim Dusty and John Williamson have continued to record and popularise the old bush ballads of Australia through the 20th and into the 21st century – and contemporary country artists including Sara Storer and Lee Kernaghan draw heavily on this heritage.

A number of British singers have spent periods in Australia and have included Australian material in their repertoires, e.g. A. L. Lloyd, Martyn Wyndham-Read, and Eric Bogle.

Notable Australian exponents of the folk revival movement included both European immigrants such as Eric Bogle, noted for his sad lament to the Gallipoli campaign "And the Band Played Waltzing Matilda", and indigenous Australians like Archie Roach and many others. In adapted forms Indigenous Australian music influenced the development of Australian country music and particularly after the folk revival, Australian folk music.

== Folk rock ==
In the 1960s and the 1970s, Australian Folk Rock brought both familiar and less familiar traditional songs, as well as new compositions, to live venues and the airwaves. Notable artists include The Bushwacker Band and Redgum. Redgum are known for their 1983 anti-war protest song "I Was Only Nineteen", which peaked at #1 on the National singles charts.

The Australian indigenous tradition brought to this mix novel elements, including new instruments, some of which are now internationally familiar, such as the didgeridoo of Northern Australia.The 1990s brought Australian Indigenous Folk Rock to the world, led by bands including Yothu Yindi. Australia's long and continuous folk tradition continues strongly to this day, with elements of folk music still influencing many contemporary artists including those generally thought of as Rock, Heavy metal and Alternative Music.

== History ==
=== Music of the convict era ===
European settlement of Australia began with the transportation of convicts from Great Britain. These convicts brought songs with them which were rapidly adapted to Australian conditions. Songs such as Moreton Bay based on the Irish song Boolavogue described the sufferings of the convicts.

The most notable songwriter of this era was Frank Macnamara, better known as Frank the Poet, author of such well known songs as Bold Jack Donahue, which developed into The Wild Colonial Boy.

The convict tradition also came to include songs popular in the English music halls, such as Botany Bay, and broadsheet ballads such as The Black Velvet Band.

=== 19th century ===
In the century following European settlement of Australia, a musical tradition developed in the bush, particularly among itinerant workers such as shearers. As in the convict era, most bush music was made by setting new words to well-known traditional or popular songs. The Bulletin, known as the 'Bushman's bible' played a prominent role in publishing and popularising new songs.

=== 1900–1950 ===
As in other countries, the spread of recorded music and the arrival of radio spelt the end of Australian bush music in its traditional form. American country music largely displaced traditional Australian music in the bush. However, traditional dance music proved more durable and retains a considerable number of adherents.

=== 1950s to 70s ===
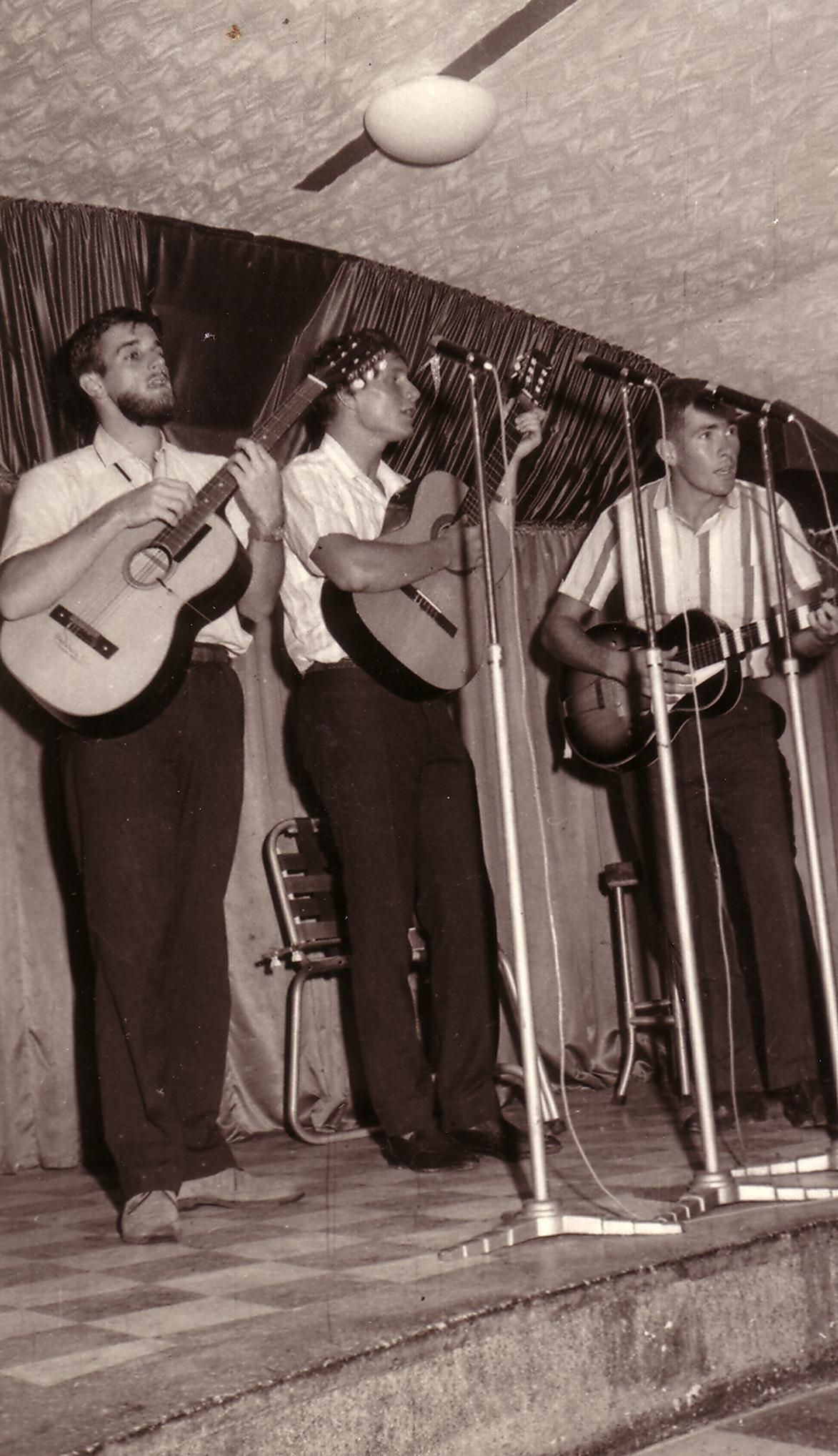
Babayaga Trio (L to R) Ray Gurney, Murray Uhlmann and Frank White on a Gold Coast, Queensland Tour 1964

1978 Mucky Duck Bush Band tour poster for the Pilbara Region

The rise of rock'n'roll and rock music in the 1950s and 60s saw the popularity of folk music decline, particularly among younger generations.

However, folk music continued to develop amongst small audiences. Bush bands experienced a revival in 1953 with the musical play Reedy River, which was first produced and published by the New Theatre (Sydney) and most recently produced in 2002. Written by Dick Diamond, the musical featured twelve or so Australian songs, which included Doreen Jacobs' setting of Helen Palmer's "Ballad of 1891", as well as the title song, Chris Kempster's setting of Lawson's "Reedy River". The backing band for this popular stage production was "The Bushwhackers", who had formed a year earlier in 1952. As the musical was performed in Brisbane and other Australian cities, local "bush bands" modeled on the Sydney group, such as Brisbane's "The Moreton Bay Bushwhackers" featuring Stan Arthur and Bill Scott, sprang up in each place; many of these remained together following the closing of the musical, and spawned other, similar groups.

This traditional period was superseded by a revival of folk music that featured more contemporary forms. The Australian band The Seekers emerged in 1963 and blended traditional music, and Lionel Long, with contemporary folk music and pop, an illustration of the rapid evolution and diversification of folk music that took place in the mid-1960s.

In Brisbane, from 1962 until it closed in 1977, the Folk Centre (renting facilities on Ann Street, adjacent to the People's Palace hotel) served as a crucible for both established and emerging artists. Stan and Kathy Arthur ran it, and the Wayfarers (Stan Arthur, Garry Tooth, Bob Stewart & Alistair Frazer) were the mainstay of the venue; while emerging local groups included the Wildwood Trio and the Babayaga Trio.

In Perth, W.A. in the early 70s, Stan Hastings ran a popular folk club called The Stables (a music venue in Malcolm Street) where Stan and his son Greg were instrumental in starting a Bush Band – Mucky Duck Bush Band. The 'Duck' turned professional in 1974, taking Australian bush music to many regional areas of W.A. Greg Hastings left the band in '79 to go solo and the band has kept going, with numerous different members throughout the years.

=== 1970s to 90s ===
The popularity of international folk-rock artists such as Bob Dylan, The Byrds, and The Band, along with the rise of protest movements, inspired new folk and folk-rock acts in Australia in the 1970s, such as Eric Bogle, Judy Small, Redgum, and the folk-punk band Roaring Jack.

Many folk acts featured songs with political or social commentary. Bogle wrote the song 'And the band played Waltzing Matilda' in 1971 as an oblique comment on the Vietnam war but instead referencing Australian involvement in Gallipoli. The song became a hit overseas in the mid 70s and has since won awards, been covered many times and been voted as one of the Top 30 Australian songs of all time.

Redgum achieved mainstream chart success in 1983 with their #1 hit 'I was only 19' – another political commentary on war.

In the 1980s and 90s Indigenous musicians such as Kev Carmody, Archie Roach and Tiddas gained a following combining acoustic folk songs with story-telling, and occasionally incorporating traditional Aboriginal instruments.

As music festivals became more popular in the 1970s, festivals dedicated to folk music began. Port Fairy folk festival started in 1977 in Victoria, under the theme of 'Australian and traditional Irish music'. The festival has continued annually, expanding its focus to include folk music from around the world. Similarly, Maleny folk festival which began in 1987 in Queensland, expanded to the Woodford folk festival in 1994, and now encompasses a wide range of international folk and some rock music. Both these, and smaller festivals such as the Blue Mountains Music Festival of Folk, Roots & Blues , have provided an outlet for folk and folk-inspired music outside mainstream venues and radio.

=== 2001-Present ===
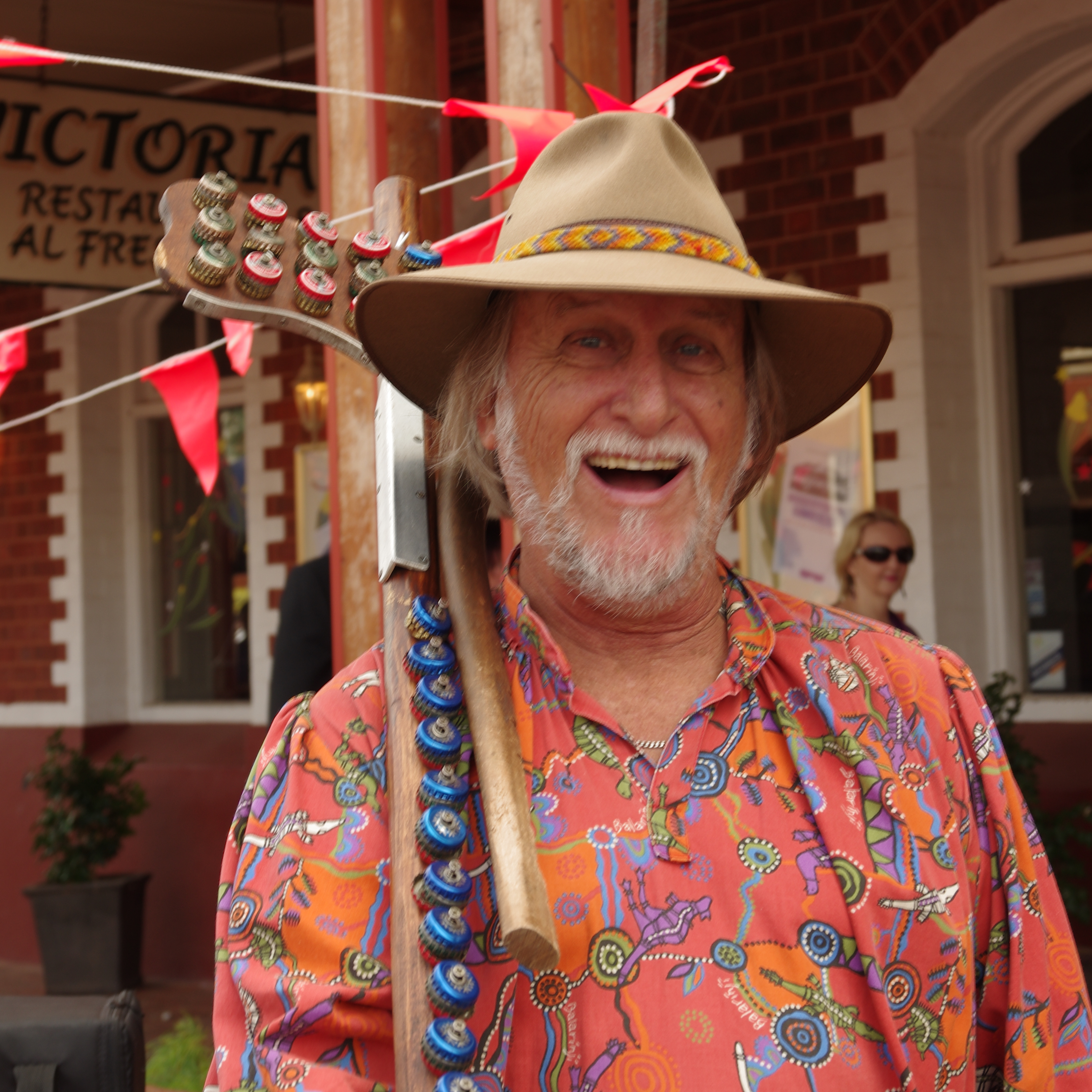
Greg Hastings at the Moondyne Festival 2013

There has been somewhat of a revival of Australian folk music in recent years with many folk bands and musicians becoming quite successful. For example, Geoffrey Gurrumul Yunupingu whose debut album Gurrumul was nominated for four ARIA awards and reached 2× Platinum. Other Bands such as Angus & Julia Stone or Boy & Bear have also heavily drawn on folk influences.

Known internationally, were the Bushwackers (spelt without the "h" as in the earlier Bushwhackers Band of the 1950s), who formed in Melbourne and were active from the early 1970s to 1984. Their style was infused with Celtic music (i.e. reels and jigs) to a greater extent than previous bush bands, and they used an electric bass guitar in place of the more traditional bush bass. The period leading up to and following Australia's Bicentenary, 1988, saw a marked resurgence in bush music and bush dances that lasted for many years.

Many bands also bearing the rock influence and adding original music rode this Australiana wave. Examples are the Ants Bush Band, Eureka!, Rantan Bush Band and Bullamakanka. Few bands formed in the 1980s survive to this day. One exception, while seeing many player changes over the years, is Currency Lads (Sydney), which still performs regularly (2009). Brisbane's Rantan Bush Band, formed in 1977, continues to perform commercially on at least a weekly basis (2010) and still has three of its original line-up.

In recent years the emergence of bands such as The Currency (Melbourne), The Handsome Young Strangers (Sydney) and Sydney City Trash (Sydney) has moved bush music into rock and roll venues and major festival stages, with a blended style that includes rock drums and guitars whilst combining with Celtic influences. The Handsome Young Strangers lean more towards the traditional style of bands such as The Bushwackers, whilst The Currency and Sydney City Trash incorporate both punk and Celtic styles. Rantan Bush Band has maintained a folk/country blend as its trademark and performs both traditional Australian songs as well as Australian country music and a supporting repertoire of regular pop and rock music for dancing.

Bush bands play music for bush dances, in which the dance program is usually based on dances known to have been danced in Australia from colonial times to the folk revival in the 1950s. Contemporary dances, composed in the traditional style, are also featured at bush dances.

== See also ==
- British folk revival
- Folk club
- Music of Australia
- Percy Grainger
- Pub session

== Bibliography ==
- Chris O'Connor & Suzette Watkins: Begged, Borrowed & Stolen, Talunga Music., 1979 ISBN 0-9594713-0-8
- David G Johnson: Bush Dance – A collection of Traditional Tunes, Bush Music Club., 1984 ISBN 0-9599528-1-0
- Max Klubal: Music for Australian Folk Dancing with Instructions, The Australian Folk Trust, 1979
- Jan Wositzky, Dobe Newton, Barry Olive: The Bushwackers Band Dance Book, Greenhouse Publications 1980 ISBN 0-909104-25-5
- Rantan Bush Band (with Mike Jackson): Bush Dance!, Bluegum Music, 1982–2009, 7th Ed., ISBN 1-875437-37-1
- Rantan Bush Band (with Mike Jackson): Social Dance!, Bluegum Music, 1994–2009, 5th Ed., ISBN 1-875437-38-X
- Mike Jackson (with Rantan Bush Band and Ian Blake): Rig-a-Jig-Jig!, Bluegum Music, 1985–2009, Combined edition, ISBN 1-875437-39-8
