= Cut to the Quick =

EP by Redgum
- Released: 1982
- Recorded: Recorders and York Street Studio, Melbourne
- Genre: Folk,
- Label: Epic
- Producer: Redgum

Redgum chronology
Brown Rice and Kerosine (1981)	Cut to the Quick (1982)	Caught in the Act (1983)

Cut to the Quick is an EP by Redgum.

"Working Girls" was later released on Frontline, "Fabulon", "The Diamantina Drover", and "Where Ya Gonna Run To" were included on 1983's Caught in the Act. "Where Ya Gonna Run To" was also included on Brown Rice and Kerosine.

More recently, in 2004 "Fabulon" and "The Diamantina Drover" were included on the Redgum anthology Against the Grain.

== Track listing ==
Side A

1. "Working Girls"
2. "Fabulon"

Side B

1. "The Diamantina Drover"
2. "Where Ya Gonna Run To"
