= If You Don't Fight You Lose =

Studio album by Redgum
- Released: 1978
- Recorded: Lucky Larry's Lepertone Studios, South Australia
- Genre: Australian folk music
- Label: Larrikin, Epic
- Producer: Mark Boath, Chris Gunn, Redgum

Redgum chronology
If You Don't Fight You Lose (1978)	Virgin Ground (1980)

If You Don't Fight You Lose is the first album by Redgum. The title is taken from a line in the song "Killing Floor".

It was originally released on vinyl and cassette. It was very briefly available on CD in the late 80s, through a licensing deal with budget label Rainbow. It has never been re-released, although some tracks were included on the 2004 Redgum collection Against the Grain.

The band at this time was a part-time group and far less polished than they later became, they were still taking form. The songs address topical issues, such as unemployment, US influence, the effects of white settlement on Australia's aboriginal population, and more.

== Track listing ==
1. "One More Boring Night In Adelaide" (J. Schumann)
2. "Carrington Cabaret" (J. Schumann)
3. "Critique in G" (Redgum)
4. "Beaumont Rag" (Redgum)
5. "Peter the Cabby" (J. Schumann)
6. "H.M.A.S. Australia" (J. Schumann)
7. "Raggin'" (M. Atkinson)
8. "So Goodbye" (J. Schumann)
9. "Poor Ned" (T. Lucas)
10. "Killing Floor" (M. Atkinson)
11. "Letter to B.J." (J. Schumann)
12. "Servin' U.S.A." (Redgum)
