= Etched in Blue =

Studio album by John Schumann
- Released: November 1987
- Recorded: May–June 1987
- Studios: Music Farm Studios, Coorabell, New South Wales
- Genre: Folk
- Label: CBS
- Producer: Peter Cobbin

John Schumann chronology
Etched in Blue (1987)	John Schumann Goes Looby-Loo: A Collection of Songs for Little Kids (1988)

Etched in Blue is the debut solo album by John Schumann, released in November 1987, the year after he left the folk rock band, Redgum. It was reissued on CD in 2009. At the APRA Music Awards of 1989, Schumann won Most Performed Australasian Country Work for the lead track, "Borrowed Ground".

== Album artwork ==
The cover art shows Schumann's face and a map in the background.

== Track listing ==
1. "Borrowed Ground" - 4:24
2. "Thunder Across The Reef" - 4:35
3. "Holy Mary" - 5:28
4. "Coming Home" - 3:48
5. "Safe Behind The Wire" - 3:28
6. "He's Got The Money" - 4:02
7. "Yuppy Days" - 4:39
8. "After The Party" - 3:52
9. "For The Children" - 4:12
10. "Borrowed Ground Reprise 1788-1988" - 4:15

== Charts ==
Chart (1987)	Peak position
Australian Albums (Kent Music Report)	63
