= Midnight Sun (Redgum album) =

Studio album by Redgum
- Released: November 1986
- Recorded: Fast Forward Studios, Melbourne, July/August 1986
- Genre: Folk, Rock
- Length: 44:01
- Label: Epic
- Producer: Michael Atkinson & Hugh McDonald

Redgum chronology
Anything's Legal, Anything Goes (1984)	Midnight Sun (1986)	The Very Best of Redgum (1987)

Midnight Sun is the fifth and final studio album by Redgum, released through Epic Records in November 1986.

John Schumann had left the group in 1985 to pursue a solo career, so Hugh McDonald took over as lead singer. Michael Atkinson left the group in 1987 after its release; the remaining members toured until 1990 to pay off the band's debts, and then disbanded.

== Track listing ==
Side A

1. "Talk" (Hugh McDonald/Michael Spicer) - 4:21
2. "When Your Luck Ran Out" (Hugh McDonald) - 5:48
3. "Running with the Hurricane" (Hugh McDonald/Michael Atkinson) - 3:47
4. "Empty Page" (Michael Spicer/Verity Truman) - 4:39
5. "Midnight Sun" (Michael Atkinson) - 4:45

Side B

1. "Too Many Dollars" (Michael Atkinson) - 3:44
2. "Another Country" (Michael Atkinson) - 5:02
3. "In Their Hands" (Verity Truman) - 4:30
4. "Blood upon the Rain" (Hugh McDonald/Michael Atkinson) - 4:24
5. "La Partida (The Parting)" (Victor Jara) - 3:05

== Charts ==
Chart (1986/87)	Position
Australia (Kent Music Report)	77

== Personnel ==
- Michael Atkinson - bass, vocals
- Hugh McDonald - lead vocals, guitars, violin
- Michael Spicer - keyboards, flute
- Verity Truman - vocals, saxophone, flute
- Alex Pertout
- Chris Doheny
- Dave Clabour
- David Burgos
- Eddie Rayner
- John Barrett
- Lisa Young
- Roger McLachlan
- Shane Howard
- Trevor Courtney
