= Scots of the Riverina =

Poem by Australian writer Henry Lawson

- by Henry Lawson
- Written: 1917
- First published in: The Bulletin
- Country: Australia
- Language: English
- Publication date: 24 May 1917

Full text
- Scots of the Riverina at Wikisource

Scots of the Riverina is a 1917 Australian bush poem by Henry Lawson. It relates the story of a boy who left his home in Riverina and is shunned by his family until he dies in World War I.

== Overview ==
It is set in the Riverina, New South Wales in the town of Gundagai. It tells of a boy who leaves home at the start of the harvest to move to the city, an unheard of and unforgivable thing for a Scot to do in the early 1900s, according to the poet: "They were Scots of the Riverina, and to run from home was a crime."

The boy's father, the old "Scot of the Riverina", burns all of his son's letters, removes his son's name from the Family Bible, and vows to never speak of his son again. Eventually the boy goes to war and is killed at Flanders, and the poem ends with the father writing his son's name back into the bible.

== Other versions ==
- Australian country singer Lee Kernaghan interpreted the poem musically on his album The Outback Club in 1992.
- Hugh McDonald recorded it on his 1994 album "Lawson" and it was later recorded by John Schumann and the Vagabond Crew on the 2005 album Lawson and also on their next album Behind the Lines.

== Publication history ==
After the poem's initial publication in The Bulletin it was then included in the following collections and anthologies:

- Selected Poems of Henry Lawson by Henry Lawson, Angus and Robertson, 1918
- A Fantasy of Man : Henry Lawson Complete Works 1901-1922 edited by Leonard Cronin, Lansdowne, 1984
- A Collection of Australian Bush Verse Peter Antill-Rose, 1989

== See also ==
- 1917 in Australian literature
