= Lawson (album) =

Studio album by John Schumann
- Released: 2005
- Recorded: May 2005
- Studios: Sing Sing, South Melbourne
- Genre: Folk
- Label: ABC Music / Universal Music Australia
- Producer: Kerryn Tolhurst

John Schumann chronology
Portrait: The Very Best of John Schumann (2002)	Lawson (2005)	Behind the Lines (2008)

Lawson is the debut album by John Schumann and the Vagabond Crew. It was Schumann's first album of new material since 1993's True Believers.

It marked the first time that Schumann had worked on an album with Hugh McDonald and Michael Atkinson since Schumann left Redgum in 1985.

The album consists of the poetry of Henry Lawson put to music.

== Album artwork ==
The cover art shows John Schumann and Henry Lawson, seemingly gazing at each other across the ages.

== Track listing ==
1. "To An Old Mate"
2. "Knocking Around"
3. "The Glass on the Bar"
4. "Second Class Wait Here"
5. "Faces In The Street"
6. "The Bush Girl"
7. "Taking His Chance"
8. "Scots of the Riverina"
9. "To Hannah"
10. "A Prouder Man Than You"
11. "The Low Lighthouse"
12. "The Shame of Going Back"
13. "To Jim"

== Personnel ==
The Vagabond Crew

- Michael Atkinson
- Shannon Bourne
- Paul Cartwright
- Michael Harris
- Rob Hirst
- Marcia Howard
- Shane Howard
- Toby Lang
- Mal Logan
- Louise McCarthy
- Hugh McDonald
- Russell Morris
- Alan Pigram
- Steven Pigram
- Mike Rudd
- Broderick Smith
- Chris Stockley
- Mick Wordley

Demo musicians

- Ian "Polly" Politis
- Rohan Powell
- Matt Schumann
- Anthony Thyer

Additional musician (mentioned on individual song pages in the liner notes)

- Kerryn Tolhurst
