= Far North West Sports League =

The Far North West Sports League was formed as a joint initiative by the Commonwealth and State governments and the SANFL to promote active lifestyles in the APY lands, situated in the far north west corner of South Australia. The FNWSL is an Australian rules football and Softball competition.

== History ==
Formed in 2007, two conferences of four teams were formed. The Eastern conference consisted of Indulkana, Mimili, Anilalya and Pukatja. The Western conference included Fregon, Amata, Murputja and Pipalyatjara. The top two teams of each conference played off for the premiership.

In August 2026, the APY League's upcoming grand final was cancelled, and the competition suspended indefinitely, after a 300 person brawl at Mutijulu oval during the qualifying finals. The fight continued into the streets surrounding the oval. Some people wielded sticks and rocks as weapons. Police responded from Mutitjulu, Yulara, Docker River and Kulgera. The league was previously suspended due to violence in 2018 and 2021.

== Current clubs ==
- Amata Bombers
- Central Swans
- Finke Crows
- Fregon Bulldogs
- Indulkana Saints
- Mimili Blues
- Pukatja Magpies
- Suns
- Pipalyatjara Lions
- Wintjalangu Saints

== Premierships ==
- 2007 Mimili 12.6.78 def Amata 8.5.53
- 2008 Pukatja 10.4.64 def Mimili 8.6.54
- 2009 Amata 10.5.65 def Mimili 7.8.50
- 2010 Mimili 9.5.59 def Fregon 8.8.56
- 2011 Amata 9.6.60 def Wintjlunga 7.10.52
- 2012 Pipalyatjara def Fregon
- 2013 Indulkana def Tjurma
- 2014 Murputja def Pukatja
- 2015 Pukatja def Indulkana
- 2016 Pukatja def Fregon
- 2017 Tjurma def Amata
- 2019 Tjurma def Wintjalangu

== 2013 Ladder ==
Far North West SL	Wins	Byes	Losses	Draws	For	Against	%	Pts
Amata	10	0	2	0	804	579	58.13%	40
Tjurma	10	0	2	0	861	683	55.76%	40
Indulkana	8	0	4	0	838	639	56.74%	32
Pukatja	7	0	5	0	859	849	50.29%	28
Fregon	6	0	6	0	734	618	54.29%	24
Murputja	5	0	7	0	753	656	53.44%	20
Pipalyatjara	2	0	10	0	609	1009	37.64%	8
Wintjalangu	0	0	12	0	468	829	36.08%	0

== Notable players ==
- Amos Frank - Hawthorn selected Frank in the AFL 2012 Rookie Draft at pick 34.

== Books ==
- Encyclopedia of South Australian country football clubs / compiled by Peter Lines. ISBN 9780980447293
- South Australian country football digest / by Peter Lines ISBN 9780987159199
