= APRA Music Awards of 1989 =

Annual Australian music awards

APRA Music Awards of 1989–1990
- Date: May 1991
- Location: Australia
- Website: apra-amcos.com.au

The Australasian Performing Right Association Awards of 1989-1990 (generally known as APRA Awards) are a series of awards held in May 1991. The APRA Music Awards were presented by Australasian Performing Right Association (APRA) and the Australasian Mechanical Copyright Owners Society (AMCOS). APRA-AMCOS changed the timing of their awards ceremony from May to the previous November and hence a special presentation for 1989/90 recipients was made at the 1991 ceremony. The Australasian Performing Right Association Awards of 1989 are a series of awards held in May 1989 at the Hilton Hotel, Sydney; and are shown in the second table below.

== 1989 – 1990 Awards ==
Only winners are noted

Award	Winner
Gold Award	"Beds Are Burning" (Peter Garrett, Robert Hirst, James Moginie) by Midnight Oil
Most Performed Australasian Country Work	"Rip Rip Woodchip" (John Williamson) by John Williamson
Most Performed Australasian Popular Work	"Crying in the Chapel" (Peter Blakeley, Aaron Zigman) by Peter Blakeley
Most Performed Australasian Serious Work	Snugglepot & Cuddlepie (Richard Mills) by Richard Mills
Most Performed Australasian Jazz Work	"Tonite I'm Alive with You" (Paul Grabowsky, Yuri Worontschak) by Paul Grabowsky and Yuri Worontschak
Most Performed Overseas Work	"Sacrifice" (Elton John, Bernie Taupin) by Elton John

== 1989 Awards ==
APRA Music Awards of 1989
- Date: 1 May 1989
- Location: Sydney, New South Wales, Australia
- Website: apra-amcos.com.au

Only winners are noted

Award	Winner
Platinum Award	Corroboree (John Antill) by John Antill and National Theatre Ballet
Platinum Award	In recognition of the outstanding popularity of their collective works throughout the world (Harry Vanda, George Young) by Vanda & Young
Gold Award	"Don't Dream It's Over" (Neil Finn) by Crowded House
Gold Award	"Need You Tonight" (Andrew Farriss, Michael Hutchence) by INXS
Gold Award	In recognition of the outstanding popularity of his many works in Australia and New Zealand by Hal David
Most Performed Australasian Music for Film	The Man from Snowy River II (Bruce Rowland) by Bruce Rowland
Most Performed Australasian Country Work	"Borrowed Ground" (John Schumann) by John Schumann
Most Performed Australasian Popular Work	"Electric Blue" (Iva Davies, John Oates) by Icehouse
Most Performed Australasian Serious Work	Fantasia (Robert Hughes)
Most Performed Australasian Jazz Work	"Disappearing Shoreline" (Paul Grabowsky) by Paul Grabowsky
Most Performed Overseas Work	"(I've Had) The Time of My Life" (John DeNicola, Donald Markowitz, Franke Previte) by Bill Medley and Jennifer Warnes

== See also ==
- Music of Australia
