= John Campbell Munro =

Scottish-Australian musical artist (1947–2018)

John Munro
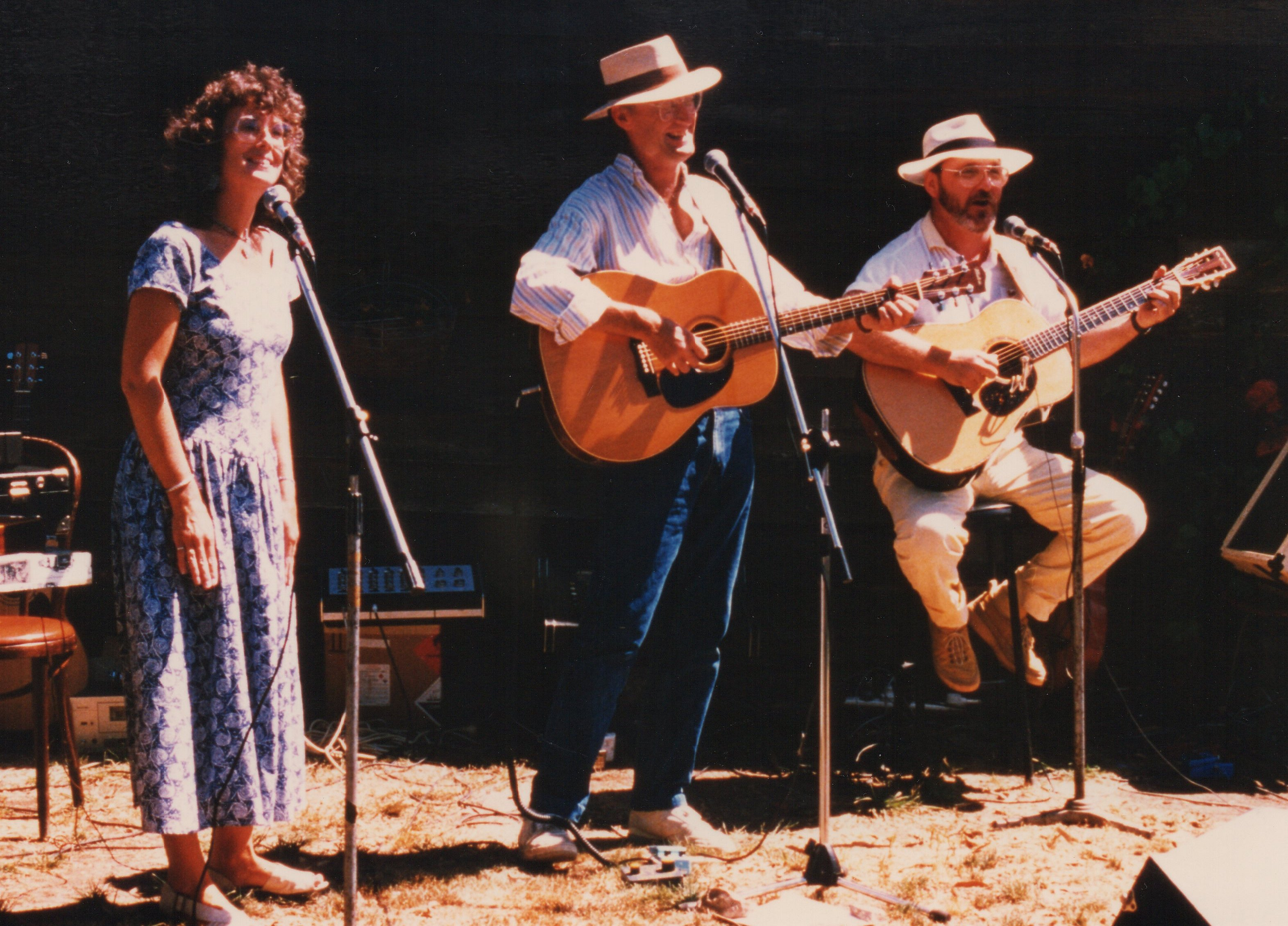
- Munro (right) with Australian folk trio Tracey-Munro-Tracey in 1988

Background information
- Birth name: John Campbell Munro
- Born: 29 September 1947; Glasgow, Scotland
- Died: 10 May 2018 (aged 70)
- Genres: Australian folk music Contemporary folk music
- Occupation(s): Musician, songwriter
- Instrument(s): Vocals, guitar
- Years active: 1970s–2018

John Campbell Munro (29 September 1947 – 10 May 2018) was a folk singer who was born in Glasgow, Scotland in 1947 and emigrated to Adelaide, Australia in 1965. He was a leading figure in Australian folk music for 40 years and worked with Eric Bogle and Australian folk groups Tracey-Munro-Tracey (with Denis and Lynne Tracey) and Colcannon.

In 1990 Munro wrote a series of 12 songs depicting the events leading up to and culminating in the battle at the Eureka Stockade. The Eureka Suite has been performed all over Australia including at the site of the stockade itself. In 1992 he composed a similar set of musical pieces on the life of Australian bushranger Ned Kelly. This piece has also proved popular in Australia and New Zealand.

Munro has written many songs and his material has been recorded by artists in Canada, the UK and Australia. He more recently formed a trio with former Colcannon members Mike O'Callaghan and Pete Titchener.

Munro died on 10 May 2018.

== See also ==
- Australian folk music
