= Mucky Duck =

Mucky Duck may refer to:

- Mucky duck, colloquial term for black swans
- Mucky Duck Bush Band, the Western Australian bush band
- McGonigel's Mucky Duck, a live music venue in Houston where Clandestine debuted
