= I Was Only 19 =

Single by Redgum
- B-side: "Yarralumla Wine"
- Released: March 1983
- Recorded: February 1983
- Genre: Australian folk
- Length: 4:19
- Label: Epic, CBS
- Songwriter: John Schumann
- Producer: Trevor Lucas

Redgum singles chronology
"Caught in the Act" (1982)	"I Was Only 19" (1983)	"ASIO" (1983)

"I Was Only 19" (a.k.a. "Only 19" or "A Walk in the Light Green") is a song by the Australian folk group Redgum. The song was released in March 1983 as a single, which hit number one on the national Kent Music Report Singles Chart for two weeks. It was also recorded for Redgum's live album Caught in the Act (Epic Records), released in June, which stayed in the top 40 of the Kent Music Report Albums Chart for four months. Royalties for the song go to the Vietnam Veterans Association of Australia. It is in the Australasian Performing Right Association's Top 30 Australian Songs of all time. "I Was Only 19" became the most widely recognised song by the band.

Redgum's lead vocalist-guitarist, John Schumann, wrote the song based on experiences he heard from veterans, particularly Mick Storen (his brother in-law) and Frankie Hunt. The mine experiences in the story pertain to an incident during Operation Mundingburra on 21 July 1969 of which Storen experienced. Schumann has said that "the power derives from the detail, provided by my mate and brother-in-law, Mick Storen, who was brave and trusting enough to share his story with me."

The song is a first-person account of a typical Australian soldier's experience in the Vietnam War, from training at Puckapunyal army base in Victoria to first hand exposure to military operations and combat, and ultimately his return home disillusioned and suffering from both PTSD and, it is implied, the harmful effects of Agent Orange. The context is the return of Vietnam vets to a sometimes hostile reception in Australia, what John Schumann perceived as soldiers returning to Australia from a "war that nobody wanted to honour [their] service in". Schumann wrote the song from a sense of injustice at this. For the live version, Schumann explained the title, "A Walk in the Light Green", as referring to operational patrols in areas marked light green on topographical maps, where dark green indicated thick jungle, plenty of cover and few land mines and light green indicated thinly wooded areas, little cover and a high likelihood of land mines.

In January 2018, as part of Triple M's "Ozzest 100", the 'most Australian' songs of all time, "I Was Only 19" was ranked number 20. In 2025, the song placed 63 on the Triple J Hottest 100 of Australian Songs.

== Impact ==
The Australian Vietnam Veterans' "Welcome Home Parade" was held in Sydney on 3 October 1987 and was followed by a concert in The Domain where Redgum's Schumann performed his song with veteran Frank Hunt on stage. From this parade, a desire for a War Memorial to commemorate Vietnam Veterans grew into fruition with the Memorial's dedication in October 1992. Australian Vietnam Forces National Memorial was constructed in Anzac Parade, Canberra in 1992 and includes a "Wall of Words": "Stele B, the northern or right-hand stele, is adorned with a series of 33 quotations fixed in stainless steel lettering." Amongst the quotations is:

Then someone called out "contact" and the bloke behind me swore,
and we hooked in there for hours, then a god-almighty roar.
Frankie kicked a mine the day that mankind kicked the moon.
God help me, he was going home in June.

A "normal language" explanation of each quote has been included, courtesy of the late Brigadier Alf Garland:

This is a quotation from the song 'I was only 19' by the Australian singing group "Red Gum" [sic]. It relates to a fire fight that had lasted for some hours when an explosion occurred. "Frankie", one of the soldiers had kicked (tripped) a landmine. In the song he died on the same day that the US put a man on the moon for the first time. Frankie was supposed to be returning home to Australia on completion of his tour in June of that year.

At the 40th-year commemoration of the Battle of Long Tần, 18 August 2006, veterans were accompanied by Australian Ambassador Bill Tweddle at the Long Tan Cross; following the commemoration, a concert was held at Vũng Tàu where Schumann (and The Vagabond Crew) sang "I Was Only 19." He also introduced Long Tần veteran Storen as the source for the song. For an SBS TV special Vietnam Nurses (2005), director Polly Watkins chose "Redgum and John Schumann's song 'Only Nineteen' during the Welcome Home Parade in 1987 because it is integral to one of the nurses' stories." Frank Hunt provides an account of his Vietnam experiences, titled "I Was Only Nineteen", in Gina Lennox' book Forged by War (August 2006).

After Schumann had received letters of request from active soldiers in Afghanistan and East Timor, he sought permission to visit the troops but obtained no answer. A reporter published an article on the situation, and authorities gave permission for Schumann to tour East Timor in December 2009 and entertain Australian and New Zealand troops. Between September and October 2011, he played for Australian troops in Afghanistan.

In 2015, Lee Kernaghan recorded the song for his album Spirit of the Anzacs. That same year, the song was added to the Sounds of Australia Registry at the National Film & Sound Archive (NFSA).

== Lyrics glossary ==
The lyrics include words, terms and place names particular to Australia and Vietnam:

- ANZAC: Australian and New Zealand soldiers who fought in the world wars. Originally the Australian and New Zealand Army Corps.
- Canungra: the jungle warfare training centre near Canungra, Queensland.
- Channel Seven: Australian television network.
- Chinook: Military helicopter.
- Contact!: Military term indicating an encounter with the enemy. Will also contain direction of contact either contact left, contact right, contact front or contact rear.
- Dustoff: Casualty evacuation by helicopter.
- Greens: Jungle Green Working Dress, the field uniform worn by the Australian Army between the early 1960s and 1989.
- The Grand Hotel: A hotel in Vung Tau that had been converted for Army use.
- Light green: parts on a map which indicated supposedly more dangerous areas for soldiers to patrol as there was little dense foliage and cover and an area which was more likely to be mined.
- Nui Dat: Village in Bà Rịa province in Southern Vietnam, and the main base of 1st Australian Task Force from 1965 to 1972.
- Puckapunyal: Former Army enlisted soldier recruit training centre in Victoria.
- Recreational Leave: Free time from duties, during the war most Rec Leaves took place in nearby Vietnamese cities, such as Vũng Tàu. Some Rec Leaves would involve the soldier(s) travelling to their home nation for longer periods, though this was not as common.
- Shoalwater: Military exercise area in Queensland.
- Sixth Battalion: (aka 6RAR) Australian army battalion, whose D Company had been involved in the Battle of Long Tan during a tour three years earlier.
- Slouch hat: Parade head-dress for the Australian army.
- SLR: Standard 7.62 mm semi-automatic rifle issued to Australian infantrymen during the Vietnam War.
- Tinnies: Cans of beer.
- Townsville: City in Queensland, home of the Australian Army's 3rd Brigade & RAAF Base Townsville. Also at the time the embarkation point for troops shipping to Vietnam from all around Australia, because it was the biggest port in Northern Australia.
- VB: Victoria Bitter (beer). Was also used as a reference to one's comrades in arms, aka "Venerable Brethren."
- Vũng Tàu: Coastal city in Southern Vietnam which was the 1st Australian Logistics Support Group base and a rest area for troops based at Nui Dat.
- Pin-up: An image featuring either the soldiers wife, or a celebrity posing in an attractive way.

== Charts ==
=== Weekly charts ===
Chart (1983)	Peak position
Australia (Kent Music Report)	1

=== Year-end charts ===
Chart (1983)	Peak position
Australia (Kent Music Report)	13

== Certifications ==
Region	Certification	Certified units/sales
Australia (ARIA)	3× Platinum	210,000^{‡}
^{‡} Sales+streaming figures based on certification alone.

== Covers and parodies ==
When the song was first released, Rick Melbourne, a breakfast radio announcer, produced a parody version of the song, including the lyrics "God help me, she told me she was sixteen". Australian country singer John Williamson recorded a live version as "Only 19" and released it on his 1984 vinyl LP, The Smell of Gumleaves (re-released in 1996 as a CD under the title Home Among the Gum Trees).

The song's and album's producer, Trevor Lucas, performed his version as a member of his United Kingdom-based group Fairport Convention at the 1985 Cropredy Festival. On the show Fast Forward, Gina Riley, in character as Eleanor LaGore, performed a swing version of the song.

The song was covered by Australian Army Band The Lancer Band in 2015 in the lead up to ANZAC Day. The cover gained positive widespread attention in the media. It differed from most covers as it was performed by soldiers and sung by a female soldier.

In October 2005, Australian hip-hop group The Herd performed a cover of the song for Triple J's Like a Version, which was voted in at number 18 in the 2005 Triple J Hottest 100 playlist and was certified Gold by the Australian Recording Industry Association (ARIA) in 2023. A studio recording of the cover, featuring additional vocals from John Schumann, was included on the 2006 reissue of the band's third studio album, The Sun Never Sets.

The song plays a symbolic role in the 2006 book World War Z by Max Brooks.

After COVID-19 had hit Australia, several musicians created their parody of the song, realising the lyrical similarity of "I was only 19" and "It was COVID-19" as well as the shared macabre nature of both topics. Among the most prominent versions were Keir Nuttall's parody and one by an artist known as BOADZ. Understandably, while the nature of the parodies got a polarised response, the dark humour did not sit well with Schumann, who contacted Nuttall with a request to take down the parody. Nuttall honoured Schumann's request. The BOADZ parody remains on Facebook, however.

"I explained that I was uncomfortable about the parody because first of all it's a sacred song, to Vietnam vets particularly, and other returned servicemen and women," Schumann said, "But also the fact is that a lot of Vietnam vets are quite old now and a lot of them have compromised health. This virus, as we know, is likely to be very, very serious for people who are old and otherwise sick."

== Track listing ==
1. "I Was Only 19 (A Walk in the Light Green)" (John Schumann) - 4:19
2. "Yarralumla Wine" (Michael Atkinson) - 2:33

== Personnel ==
Single version "I Was Only 19" (March 1983) – 4:19
Only Schumann and McDonald of Redgum played on this track:

- John Schumann – lead vocals, guitar
- Hugh McDonald – violin, vocals
- Brian Czempinski – drums (later became a member of Redgum)
- Trevor Lucas – backing vocals, producer
- Peter Coughlan – bass guitar

Caught in the Act live version, "I Was Only 19 (A Walk in the Light Green)" (1983) – 5:57
Schumann introduces the song and explains the phrase 'A Walk in the Light Green' which he gives as its title. Recorded at The Rose, Shamrock and Thistle Hotel (aka Three Weeds Hotel) in Rozelle, New South Wales:

- Michael Atkinson – guitar, mandolin, piano, vocals
- Hugh McDonald – violin, vocals
- John Schumann – lead vocals, guitar
- Verity Truman – flute, tin whistle, vocals
- Trevor Lucas – producer
- Jim Barton – engineer

== 2013 re-release ==
John Schumann released the song as an acoustic single on iTunes to commemorate 30 years since the song's original release. The single was the version recorded for the 2008 Vagabond Crew album Behind The Lines.

== See also ==
- 19 (song)
- And the Band Played Waltzing Matilda
