= Caught in the Act (Redgum album) =

Live album by Redgum
- Released: May 1983
- Recorded: Rose, Shamrock, and Thistle, Sydney, New South Wales
- Genre: Australian folk, Australian rock
- Length: 70:28
- Label: Epic
- Producer: Trevor Lucas

Redgum chronology
Cut to the Quick (1982)	Caught in the Act (1983)	Frontline (1984)

Caught in the Act is the first live album by Australian folk group Redgum, released in May 1983 on Epic Records. The title is taken from the sixth track, which was also featured on Brown Rice and Kerosine.

It features "I Was Only Nineteen", which was a number one hit in Australia.

== Track listing ==
Side A

1. "Beaumont Rag (Redgum) - 10:19
2. "The Last Frontier" (John Schumann) - 4:10
3. "Brown Rice & Kerosine" (M. Atkinson) - 3:23
4. "Nuclear Cop" (Redgum) - 3:43
5. "I Was Only 19 (A Walk in the Light Green)" (John Schumann) - 4:58

Side B

1. "Fabulon" (Byrne, Redgum, Tradational) - 2:30
2. "The Diamantina Drover" (Hugh McDonald) - 5:25
3. "Where Ya Gonna Run to" (John Schumann) - 3:59
4. "It Doesn't Matter to Me" (Schumann, Atkinson) - 5:19
5. "Long Run" (John Schumann) - 3:23
6. "Poor Ned" (Trevor Lucas) - 3:43
7. "Raggin'" (Hicks, Atkinson) - 2:20

Bonus Single

Side C

1. "Caught in the Act" (Redgum) - 9:15

Side D

1. "Stewie" (John Schumann) - 4:56
2. "Lear Jets Over Kulgera" (M Atkinson) - 3:06

The last three tracks were originally included as a bonus 7-inch EP with early copies of the album. They were also placed between "I Was Only 19" and "Fabulon" on cassette and CD versions of the album, and appear thusly on the 2016 double LP reissue.

== Charts ==
Chart (1983)	Peak position
Australia (Kent Music Report)	5

== Certifications and sales ==
Region	Certification	Certified units/sales
Australia (ARIA)	Gold	20,000^{^}
^{^} Shipments figures based on certification alone.
