= Kulgera, Northern Territory =

Kulgera
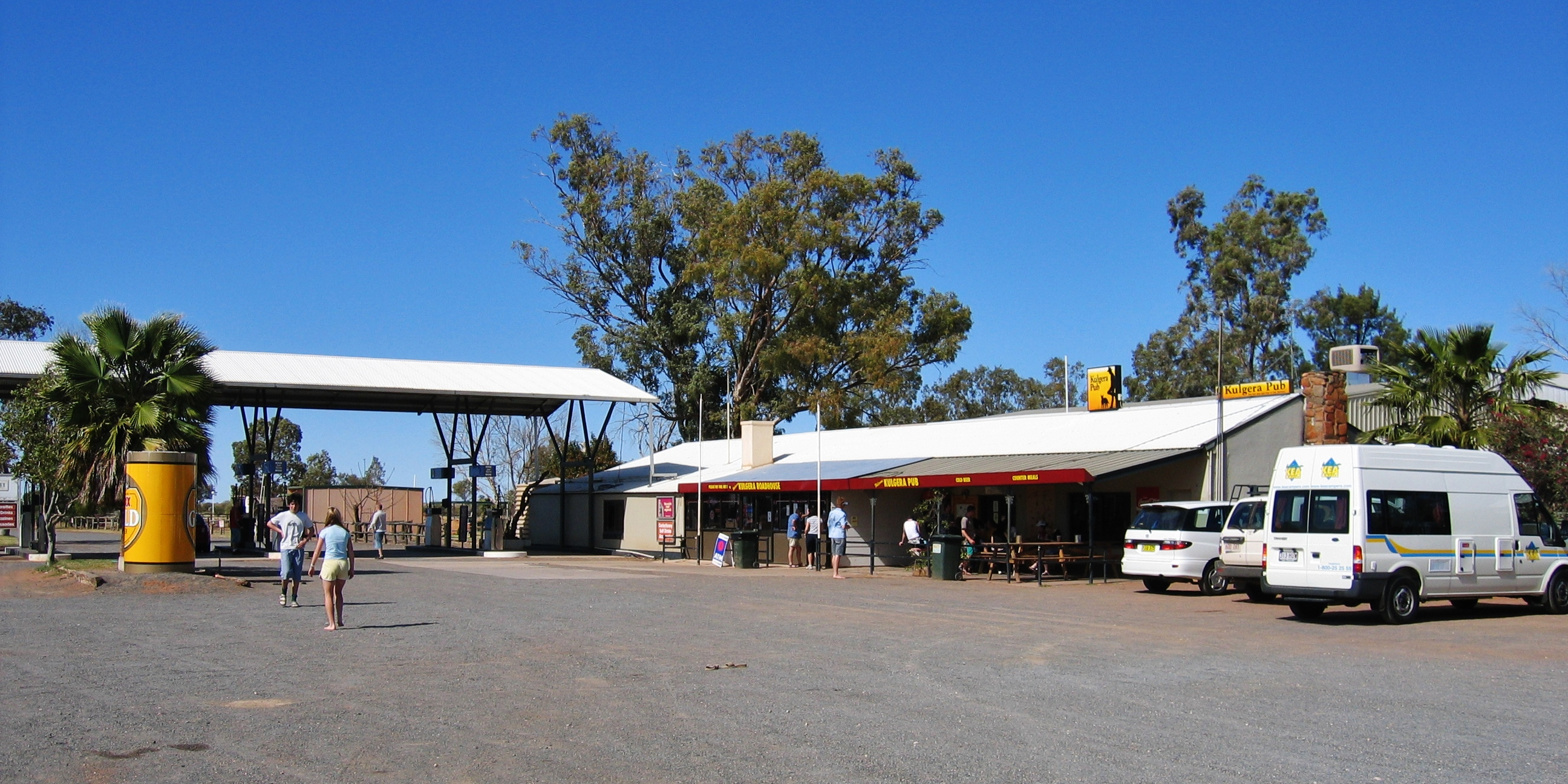
- Kulgera Pub

- Coordinates: 25°50′27″S 133°18′02″E
- Country: Australia
- State: Northern Territory
- City: Ghan
- LGA: MacDonnell Region

Government
  - Territory electorate: Namatjira
  - Federal division: Lingiari
- Elevation: 509 m (1,670 ft)

Population
  - Total: 50 (2006 census)
- Postcode: 0872
- Mean max temp: 28.6 °C (83.5 °F)
- Mean min temp: 13.9 °C (57.0 °F)
- Annual rainfall: 249.9 mm (9.84 in)

Kulgera is a locality in the Northern Territory of Australia. It is 275 kilometres (171 mi) south of Alice Springs and 21 kilometres (13 mi) north of the border with South Australia, making it the southernmost permanent settlement in the Northern Territory. It sits on the junction of the Stuart Highway and the road to Aputula. In the 2006 Australian census it had a population of 50.

== History ==
Kulgera is the Pitjantjatjara name for an outcrop of granite rocks just east of the settlement. According to Nicolas Rothwell, Kulgera is derived from kalgka in the Pertam language of the mountains and that word "refers to a particularly private recess of a private part of the female anatomy".

A pastoral lease of 1,370 square kilometres (530 sq mi) to the north east of the outcrop was granted to the Coulthard family in 1928 and was named Kulgera Station.

== Transport ==
Kulgera is located on Stuart Highway. It is served by Greyhound Australia. Being the closest settlement to the South Australia/Northern Territory border makes it a well-known locality among travellers.

Kulgera railway station is 12 km east of the settlement on the Adelaide–Darwin railway. The Ghan, run by Journey Beyond Rail between Adelaide and Darwin arrives twice weekly in each direction.

Kulgera Airport (IATA: KGR, ICAO: YKUL) is adjacent to the settlement but is served only by charter flights.

== Climate ==
Climate staticstics were monitored in Kulgera since 1968.

Climate data for Kulgera
Month	Jan	Feb	Mar	Apr	May	Jun	Jul	Aug	Sep	Oct	Nov	Dec	Year
Record high °C (°F)	47.0 (116.6)	45.5 (113.9)	43.8 (110.8)	39.9 (103.8)	34.0 (93.2)	32.0 (89.6)	30.7 (87.3)	34.5 (94.1)	38.6 (101.5)	43.0 (109.4)	44.7 (112.5)	47.0 (116.6)	47.0 (116.6)
Mean daily maximum °C (°F)	37.0 (98.6)	35.7 (96.3)	32.4 (90.3)	28.3 (82.9)	22.9 (73.2)	18.9 (66.0)	19.2 (66.6)	22.1 (71.8)	27.1 (80.8)	30.8 (87.4)	33.6 (92.5)	35.1 (95.2)	28.6 (83.5)
Mean daily minimum °C (°F)	22.1 (71.8)	21.3 (70.3)	18.0 (64.4)	13.9 (57.0)	9.0 (48.2)	5.2 (41.4)	4.8 (40.6)	6.6 (43.9)	11.3 (52.3)	15.3 (59.5)	18.4 (65.1)	20.3 (68.5)	13.9 (56.9)
Record low °C (°F)	9.0 (48.2)	10.8 (51.4)	7.0 (44.6)	1.5 (34.7)	−2.1 (28.2)	−4.5 (23.9)	−4.8 (23.4)	−2.8 (27.0)	−1.0 (30.2)	2.9 (37.2)	5.4 (41.7)	9.5 (49.1)	−4.8 (23.4)
Average rainfall mm (inches)	28.9 (1.14)	32.5 (1.28)	29.1 (1.15)	13.3 (0.52)	12.3 (0.48)	15.8 (0.62)	11.6 (0.46)	8.5 (0.33)	14.8 (0.58)	19.4 (0.76)	25.2 (0.99)	32.8 (1.29)	244.2 (9.6)
Source: Bureau of Meteorology

== In popular culture ==
Kulgera features in the Redgum song "Lear Jets Over Kulgera" from their 1981 album Brown Rice and Kerosine.
