= Brown Rice and Kerosine =

Studio album by Redgum
- Released: 1981
- Recorded: Music Farm Studios, Byron Bay, NSW, September/October 1981
- Genre: Folk
- Length: 35:58
- Label: Epic
- Producer: John French

Redgum chronology
Virgin Ground (1980)	Brown Rice and Kerosine (1981)	Cut to the Quick (1982)

Brown Rice and Kerosine is the third album by Australian folk-rock group Redgum. The title is taken from the first track, and the album was released around the time Redgum changed from a part-time band to a full-time job for its members.

"100 Years On" was released as a single. As noted on a sticker on the cover, the song "Liberal Values" was to have been included on the album but was removed for legal reasons. It was a parody of Bacharach/David's "(The Man Who Shot) Liberty Valance". In April 2019, a recording of a live performance of "Liberal Values" from 1980 was uploaded to YouTube.

It was originally released as a record and was very briefly available on CD in the late 80s. Some tracks were included on the 2004 collection Against the Grain.

== Track listing ==
Side A

1. "100 Years On" (J. Schumann)
2. "Lear Jets Over Kulgera" (M. Atkinson)
3. "Caught in the Act" (M. Atkinson/J. Schumann/V. Truman/C. Timms)
4. "Yarralumla Wine" (M. Atkinson)
5. "Where Ya Gonna Run to" (J. Schumann)

Side B

1. "Brown Rice and Kerosine" (M. Atkinson)
2. "The Federal Two-Ring Circus" (M. Atkinson)
3. "Your O.S. Trip" (M. Atkinson)
4. "The Last Frontier" (J. Schumann)
5. "Parramatta Gaol 1843" (M. Atkinson/V. Truman)

== Charts ==
Chart (1981/82)	Position
Australia (Kent Music Report)	48
