= APRA Top 30 Australian songs =

Song list created by the Australian Performing Right Association

APRA's Top 30 Australian songs was a list created by the Australasian Performing Right Association (APRA) in 2001, to celebrate its 75th anniversary. A panel of 100 music personalities were asked to list the "ten best and most significant Australian songs of the past 75 years". The top ten songs, in numerical order, were announced on 28 May 2001 at the APRA Awards. The next twenty were not ordered and had been released nearly four weeks earlier, on 2 May, in a media statement by APRA representative Debbie Kruger.

At the 2001 APRA Awards ceremony, You Am I performed the No. 1 listed song "Friday on My Mind" with Harry Vanda of the Easybeats guesting on guitar. Ross Wilson of Daddy Cool performed the No. 2 listed song "Eagle Rock", while Midnight Oil's "Beds are Burning" at No. 3 was shown on video introduced by Senator Aden Ridgeway as an Indigenous spokesperson on reconciliation.

== Top Ten songs ==
No.	Titles	Performers	Year	Writers	Music publishers	Peak chart position	
No.	Titles	Performers	Year	Writers	Music publishers	AUS	NZ
1	"Friday on My Mind"	The Easybeats	1966	Harry Vanda, George Young	J Albert & Son Pty Ltd	1	2
2	"Eagle Rock"	Daddy Cool	1971	Ross Wilson	Mushroom Music Pty Ltd	1	1
3	"Beds Are Burning"	Midnight Oil	1987	Rob Hirst, James Moginie, Peter Garrett	Sony Music Publ. Aus.	6	1
4	"Down Under"	Men at Work	1981	Colin Hay, Ron Strykert	EMI Songs Aus. Pty Ltd	1	1
5	"A Pub with No Beer"	Slim Dusty	1957	Gordon Parsons	EMI Music Publ. Aus. Pty Ltd	1	—
6	"The Loved One"	The Loved Ones	1966	Ian Clyne, Gerry Humphrys, Robert Lovett	Mushroom Music Pty Ltd	2	—
7	"Don't Dream It's Over"	Crowded House	1986	Neil Finn	Mushroom Music Pty Ltd	8	1
8	"Khe Sanh"	Cold Chisel	1978	Don Walker	Rondor Music Aus. Pty Ltd	40	—
9	"It's A Long Way To The Top"	AC/DC	1976	Bon Scott, Angus Young, Malcolm Young	J Albert & Son Pty Ltd	5	—
10	"Quasimodo's Dream"	The Reels	1981	Dave Mason	Festival Music Pty Ltd	—	—

== The remaining 20 songs ==
Listed in chronological order:

Year	Titles	Performers	Writers	Music publishers	Peak chart position	
Year	Titles	Performers	Writers	Music publishers	AUS	NZ
1922	"Along the Road to Gundagai"	Jack O'Hagan & various	Jack O'Hagan	Allans Music Aus.	—	—
1969	"The Real Thing"	Russell Morris	Johnny Young	Chappell & Co Aus.	1	—
1971	"I'll Be Gone"	Spectrum	Michael Rudd	Cellar Music Co	1	—
1972	"And the Band Played Waltzing Matilda"	The Bushwackers (1976); Eric Bogle (1980)	Eric Bogle	Larrikin Music Publ.	—	—
1976	"I'm Stranded"	The Saints	Chris Bailey, Ed Kuepper	Mushroom Music	—	—
1979	"Cool Change"	Little River Band	Glenn Shorrock	Warner Chappell Music	—	25
1982	"Science Fiction"	Divinyls	Christina Amphlett, Mark McEntee	EMI Music Publ. Aus.	13	—
1982	"Power and the Passion"	Midnight Oil	Robert Hirst, James Moginie, Peter Garrett	Sony Music Publ. Aus.	8	4
1983	"Reckless"	Australian Crawl	James Reyne	Warner Chappell Music	1	8
1983	"Cattle and Cane"	The Go-Betweens	Grant McLennan, Robert Forster	Festival Music, Complete Music Ltd (PRS)	—	—
1983	"I Was Only Nineteen"	Redgum	John Schumann	Universal/MCA Music Publ.	1	41
1984	"Throw Your Arms Around Me"	Hunters & Collectors	John Archer, Geoffrey Crosby, Douglas Falconer, Robert Miles, Mark Seymour, Michael Waters, John Howard	Mushroom Music	49	28
1986	"Wide Open Road"	The Triffids	David McComb	Mushroom Music	64	—
1987	"To Her Door"	Paul Kelly and The Coloured Girls	Paul Kelly and The Coloured Girls	Mushroom Music	14	—
1988	"My Island Home"	Warumpi Band (1988), Christine Anu (1995), Neil Murray	Neil Murray	Rondor Music Aus.	—	—
1990	"The Ship Song"	Nick Cave and the Bad Seeds	Nick Cave	Mute Song (PRS), Mushroom Music	—	—
1991	"Treaty"	Yothu Yindi	Paul Kelly, Mandawuy Yunupingu, Stuart Kellaway, Cal Williams, Galarrwuy Yunupingu, Milkayngu Mununggurr, Witiyana Marika	Mushroom Music	11	—
1997	"Even When I'm Sleeping"	Leonardo's Bride	Dean Manning	Mushroom Music	4	34
1997	"Truly Madly Deeply"	Savage Garden	Darren Hayes, Daniel Jones	EMI Music Publ. Aus. / Rough Cut Music	1	12
1998	"The Day You Come"	Powderfinger	Jonathan Coghill, John Collins, Ian Haug, Darren Middleton, Bernard Fanning	Universal Music Publ.	25	—

== See also ==
- APRA Top 100 New Zealand Songs of All Time
