= And the Band Played Waltzing Matilda =

1971 song by Eric Bogle

Song by Eric Bogle
- Written: 1971
- Genre: Anti-war song
- Composer: Eric Bogle
- Lyricist: Eric Bogle

"And the Band Played Waltzing Matilda" is a song written by Scottish-born Australian singer-songwriter Eric Bogle in 1971. The song describes war as futile and gruesome, and criticises its glorification. This is exemplified in the song by the account of a young Australian who is maimed during the Gallipoli Campaign of the First World War. The protagonist, who had travelled across rural Australia before the war, is devastated by the loss of his legs in battle. As the years pass he notes the death of other veterans, while the younger generation becomes apathetic to them and their cause.

The chorus begins with the phrase "And the band played Waltzing Matilda". The song "Waltzing Matilda", by Australian poet Banjo Paterson, is the unofficial national anthem to which the young Australian volunteers of Bogle's song march to war and return from war and which is played when the war is remembered. At the conclusion of Bogle's song, its melody and a few of its lyrics, with modifications, are incorporated.

Many cover versions of the song have been performed and recorded, as well as many versions in foreign languages.

== Narrative ==
The song is an account of the memories of an old Australian man who, in his youth, had travelled across rural Australia as a swagman, "waltzing [his] Matilda" (carrying his "swag", a combination of portable sleeping gear and luggage) all over the bush and the outback. In 1915, he joined the Australian armed forces and was sent to Gallipoli. For "ten weary weeks", he kept himself alive as "around [him] the corpses piled higher". Eventually, he is wounded by a shell burst and awakens in hospital to find that he has lost his legs. He declares it to be a fate worse than death, as he can "go no more waltzing Matilda".

When the ship carrying the young soldiers had left Australia, the band played "Waltzing Matilda" while crowds waved flags and cheered. When the crippled narrator returns and "the legless, the armless, the blind, the insane" are carried down the gangway, the people watch in silence and turn their faces away. As an old man, he now watches his comrades march in Anzac Day parades from his porch. As the war falls out of living memory, young people question the purpose of the observances, and he finds himself doing the same. With each passing year, the parades become smaller, as "more old men disappear", and he observes that "some day, no one will march there at all".

== Composition and style ==
Interviewed by The Sydney Morning Herald in 2002, Bogle said that as a 12-year-old boy in Peebles, Scotland in 1956, he had purchased a set of bound volumes of World War Illustrated, a weekly "penny dreadful propaganda sheet", which had been published during World War I. Bogle was inspired by the photography and felt a sense of "...the enormity of the conflict and its individual toll". In his teens he was a voracious reader of everything on the war and already knew much about the Anzacs' role at Gallipoli before he emigrated to Australia in 1969.

Bogle wrote the song in the space of two weeks in 1971, inspired by an Anzac Day march he saw in Canberra shortly after moving to Australia. Interviewed in 2009 for The Scotsman, he said:

I wrote it as an oblique comment on the Vietnam War, which was in full swing... but while boys from Australia were dying there, people had hardly any idea where Vietnam was. Gallipoli was a lot closer to the Australian ethos – every schoolkid knew the story, so I set the song there. ... At first the Returned Service League and all these people didn't accept it at all; they thought it was anti-soldier, but they've come full circle now and they see it's certainly anti-war but not anti-soldier.

He told The Sydney Morning Herald:

A lot of people now think the song is traditional. And a lot of people think that I died in the war, and penned it in blood as I expired in the bottom of a trench. I never thought the song would outlast me, but I have decided now there's no doubt it will. For how long, I have no idea. Nothing lasts forever. Hopefully it'll be sung for quite a few years down the track, especially in this country. And hopefully it will get to the stage where everyone forgets who wrote it.

The chorus begins with the phrase "And the band played Waltzing Matilda". The song "Waltzing Matilda", by Australian poet Banjo Paterson, is the almost national anthem to which the young Australian volunteers of Bogle's song march to war and return from war and which is played when the war is remembered. At the conclusion of Bogle's song, its melody and a few of its lyrics, with modifications, are incorporated.

== Background ==
The song was originally eight verses long, but Bogle pared it down to five. In 1974, Bogle entered the National Folk Festival songwriting competition in Brisbane, which offered a first prize of a $300 Ovation guitar. Bogle sang two songs, with Matilda as the second. He later recalled:

I sang the first song and got polite applause. Then I did Matilda, and for the first time, and thankfully not the last, there was a second's silence after I finished. I thought, "I've fucked it here." I hadn't sung it very well. Then this storm of applause broke out and I thought, "Ovation guitar, come to daddy!" Well, that wasn't my first thought, but it was pretty close to my first thought.

The judges awarded the song third place, but their decision caused a small storm of protest, focusing more attention on the song, Bogle thought, than outright victory would have done. Jane Herivel from the Channel Islands had heard Bogle sing at the festival and asked him to send her a recording. She sang it at a festival in the south of England, where folk singer June Tabor heard it and later recorded it for her 1976 debut solo album Airs and Graces. Unknown to Bogle, the song became famous in the UK and North America; so when Bogle was in the UK in 1976 he was surprised to be asked to perform at a local folk club on the strength of the song.

== Historical accuracy ==
The line "they gave me a tin hat" is anachronistic, as steel helmets were not issued to British and Empire troops at Gallipoli.

Walsh (2018) suggests that the line "they marched me away to the war" implies compulsion in the form of conscription, whereas all Australian troops in Europe were volunteers, and the government did not force conscripts to fight overseas.

The song refers to the fighting at Suvla Bay in the lines:

And how well I remember that terrible day, how our blood stained the sand and the water.
And of how in that hell that they called Suvla Bay, we were butchered like lambs at the slaughter.

The vast majority of the 16,000 Australian and New Zealand troops landed not at Suvla but at Anzac Cove, 8 kilometres to the south, and some 15 weeks earlier. There was a small Australian presence at Suvla, the Royal Australian Naval Bridging Train, an engineering and construction unit comprising 350 men, of whom none were killed during the initial landing and two by the time the campaign was abandoned eleven months later. Bogle states that he substituted "Anzac" for "Suvla" because at the time he wrote the song (1971) there was a "deeply ingrained misconception" among Australians that all their troops had fought entirely at Suvla. He also states that it was easier to incorporate the word "Suvla" into the lyric.

== Covers ==
The first release of the song was by John Currie on the Australian label M7 in 1975.

Other cover versions of the song have been performed and recorded by The Pogues, Katie Noonan (Flametree Festival Byron Bay 08), The Irish Rovers, Joan Baez, June Tabor, Priscilla Herdman, Liam Clancy, Martin Curtis, The Dubliners, Ronnie Drew, Danny Doyle, Slim Dusty, The Fenians, Mike Harding, Jolie Holland, Seamus Kennedy, Johnny Logan and Friends, John Allan Cameron, John McDermott, Midnight Oil, Christy Moore, William Crighton, The Sands Family, the Skids, John Williamson, The Bushwackers and the bluegrass band Kruger Brothers, Redgum, John Schumann, Tickawinda (on the album Rosemary Lane), Orthodox Celts, The Houghton Weavers, Elizabeth Smith & The Lancers (Australian Army Band), and Bread and Roses. Audrey Auld-Mezera (on the album Billabong Song), Garrison Keillor has also performed it on his radio show A Prairie Home Companion when ANZAC Day (25 April) has fallen on a Saturday and has also performed his own adaptation titled And the Band Played The Star-Spangled Banner. Phil Coulter released a cover on his 2007 album Timeless Tranquility - 20 Year Celebration.

American Vietnam veteran and Medal of Honor recipient Senator Bob Kerrey, who lost half his leg in the war, sang the song to his supporters after being elected to the United States Senate in 1988, and borrowed the first line for the title of his 2002 autobiography, When I Was A Young Man: A Memoir. Every year on 25 April, Lucy Ward is invited to sing the song at the annual ANZAC Day service held at the Gallipoli Memorial at the National Memorial Arboretum at Alrewas. While touring the country, in April 2014, Ward also performed the song to a capacity crowd at The Grand Pavilion in Matlock Bath.

== Non-English versions ==
The song was translated into French (Et l'orchestre jouait la valse de Mathilde) by the musical duo Ambages in 2014.

== Recognition and awards ==
In 1986 the song was given a Gold Award 1986 by the Australasian Performing Right Association (APRA). In May 2001 the APRA, as part of its 75th Anniversary celebrations, named "And the Band Played Waltzing Matilda" as one of the Top 30 Australian songs of all time.

== See also ==
- "No Man's Land"
- List of anti-war songs
