= Michael Easton (composer) =

- Born: 1954; Stevenage, Hertfordshire, England
- Died: 6 February 2004 (aged 49) London, England
- Occupations: Composer, musician, music critic

Michael Easton (1954 – 6 February 2004) was a British composer, musician, and music critic. Born in Stevenage, Hertfordshire, he was a co-founder of the Port Fairy Spring Music Festival in Victoria, Australia.

== Career ==
After encouragement from composer Elizabeth Poston, he trained at the Royal Academy of Music with Lennox Berkeley (composition) and Norman Del Mar (conducting).

Easton worked in music publishing before moving to Melbourne, Australia in 1982, where in 1986 he became a freelance composer. His activities included arranging, performing (in a piano duo with Len Vorster) and writing and broadcasting on music. With Vorster and the English composer Michael Hurd he co-founded the Port Fairy Spring Music Festival in 1990.

Easton and Michael Atkinson were nominated for the 1994 ARIA Award for Best Original Soundtrack, Cast or Show Album for their music to the Australian TV series Snowy. A Naxos CD issued in 1998 includes recordings of five of his orchestral works: Concerto on Australian Themes (1996), An Australian in Paris (1995), Beasts of the Bush (1995), the Concerto for Piano Accordion, Piano and Strings (1996, for Bernadette Conlon) and Overture to an Italianate Comedy.

His other works include three symphonies, nine operas – including several children's operas, such as The Emperor's New Clothes (1993), and The Selfish Giant (1995) – and a successful musical, Dorothy Parker Says (1993).

A Voice Not Stilled, a concerto for piano and orchestra on a fragment of music recovered from a victim of the holocaust, was premiered in July 2000. He scored the short comedy film The Moment of Accepting Life, shown at the 2001 Cannes International Film Festival.

== Death and legacy ==
Easton died at the age of 49 in London on 6 February 2004, one day after suffering a fall.

As of 2026 the Port Fairy Spring Music Festival continues to be held annually.

== Awards and nominations ==
=== ARIA Music Awards ===
The ARIA Music Awards is an annual awards ceremony held by the Australian Recording Industry Association. They commenced in 1987.

Year	Nominee / work	Award	Result	Ref.
1994	Snowy (with Michael Atkinson)	Best Original Soundtrack, Cast or Show Album	Nominated	
