= Mucky Duck Bush Band =

Australian folk and country music band

The Mucky Duck Bush Band
- 1978 Nor'west Folk Tours poster

Background information
- Origin: Perth, Western Australia, Australia
- Genres: Bush band, Australian country music, Australian folk music
- Years active: 1974–2026
- Labels: Larrikin, Pocket Universe
- Members: Don Blue, John Perry, Erik Kowarski
- Past members: Stan Hastings, Greg Hastings, Barry Halpin, Butch Hooper, Jerry Everard, Val Hastings, David Browne, Roy Abbott, Roger Montgomery, Rob Kay, John Angliss, Andy Copeman, Martin Coulter, Adam Ashforth, David Ralph.
- Website: www.muckyduckbushband.com

The Mucky Duck Bush Band, often called Mucky Duck, is a Western Australian Australian folk and country music band and bush band formed in 1973 in Perth, Western Australia. The band was founded by Stan Hastings, who ran the folk club The Stables in Northbridge, and his son Greg Hastings. They turned professional in 1978, touring around Western Australia.

In 1982 they performed a musical Moondyne Joe (about the bushranger of that name) at the Regal Theatre in Subiaco.

The group had a changing lineup over the years and in 2003 it was revealed that English writers had made the dubious claim that their lineup had included Lord Lucan.

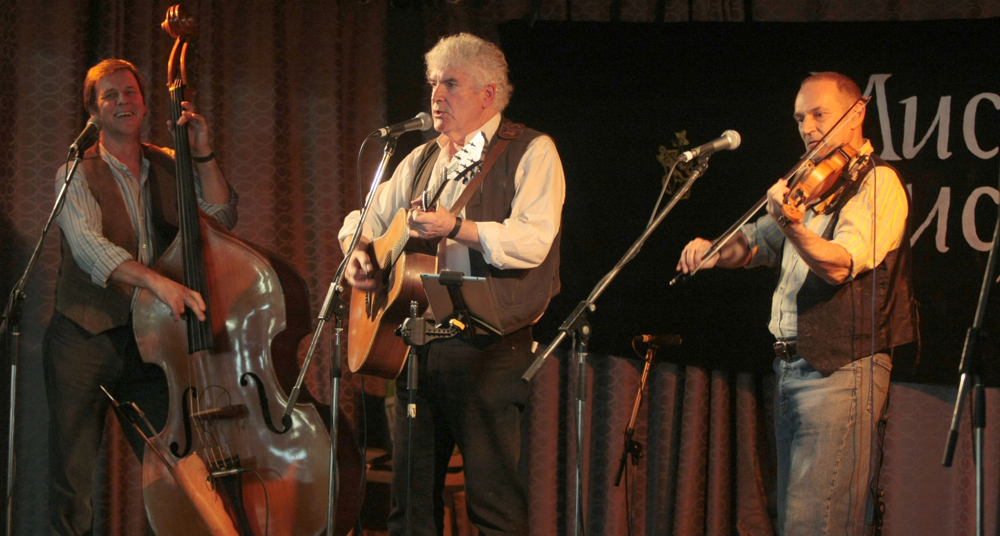
Mucky Duck Bush Band at CD/Book Launch, Fairbrdge Festival, 26 April 2014. L-R: John Perry, Don Blue, Erik Kowarski

Mucky Duck's current lineup (since 2002) is Don Blue (guitar, whistle, vocals), John Perry (bass, vocals) and Erik Kowarski (fiddle, guitar, vocals). For some performances they are joined by Bob Emery (mandolin, guitar, vocals).

== Discography and works ==
- The Mucky Duck Bush Band (1980), At last the Mucky Duck album, Grass Roots Productions
- Mucky Duck Bush Band (1982), Dance on with the Duck an introduction to early colonial dances, Thank-You-Both Productions, Greenmount, W.A. : Edwest [distributor]
- Life. Be in it; Mucky Duck Bush Band (1982), With the compliments of Mucky Duck Bush Band and Life.Be in It. : an introduction to early colonial dances, Life. Be in it
- Abbott, Roy; Montgomery, Roger; Mucky Duck Bush Band (1982), Moondyne Joe, The Band
- Montgomery, Roger (1985), Pilbara connection, Roger Limpid Productions
- Mucky Duck Bush Band (1985), From the bush, Larrikin
- Mucky Duck Bush Band; Abbott, Roy Charles (2004), Mucky Duck Bush Band 1974–2004 three ducking decades, Pocket Universe
- Mucky Duck Bush Band (2014), The Heart of Duckness, Pocket Universe
- Blue, Don (2014), Duck Tales: A History of the Mucky Duck Bush Band 1973-2013, Don Blue
