= Martin Curtis =

New Zealand musician

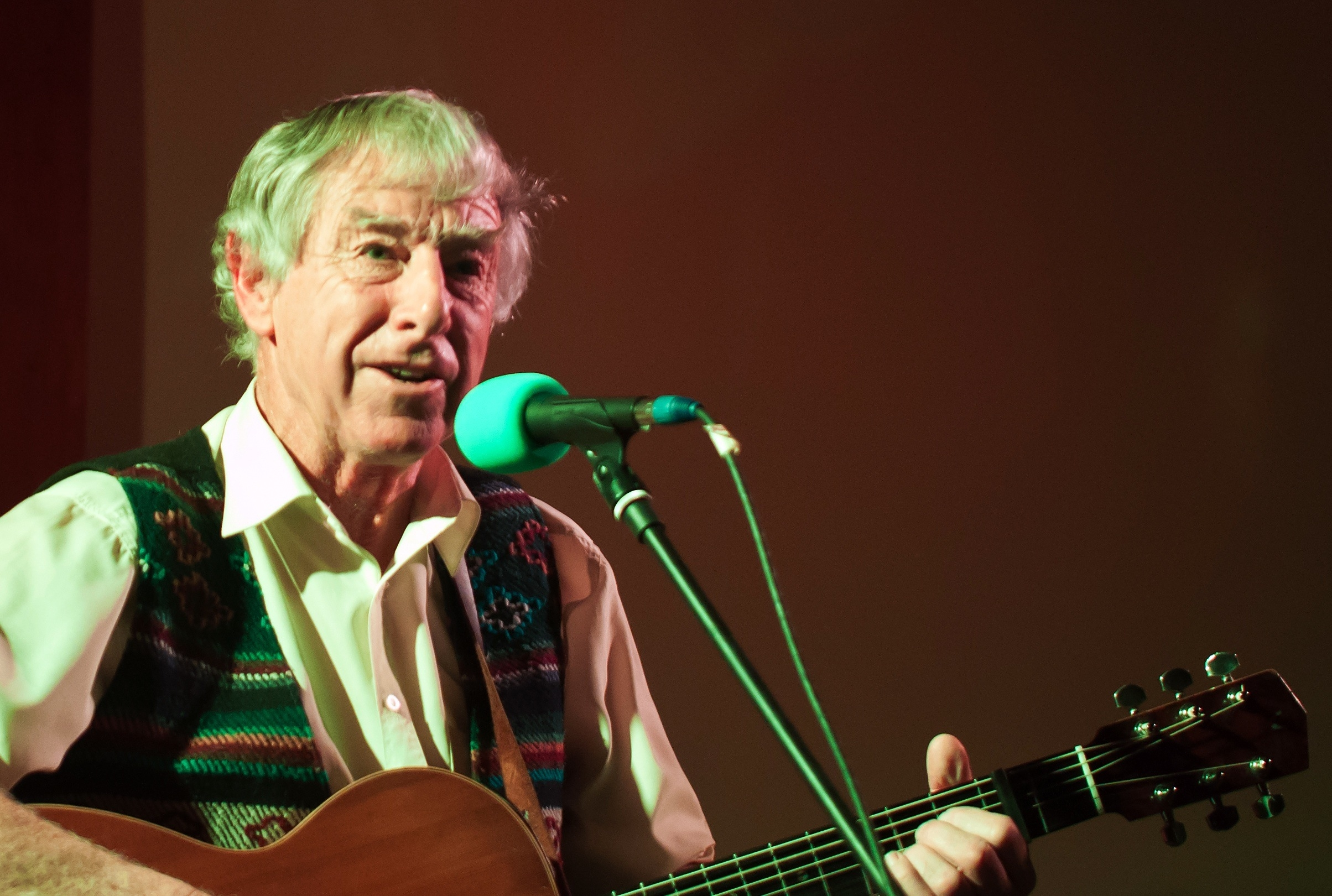

Background information
- Origin: Central Otago, New Zealand
- Genres: Folk
- Years active: 1970's - present
- Labels: Gin & Raspberry Records
- Website: https://www.martincurtis.co.nz/

Martin Curtis is a New Zealand singer / songwriter who has released over 12 albums in a career spanning 5 decades. He has toured extensively nationally and internationally, particularly in the United Kingdom, as well as Australia, Hong Kong, Austria, Norway and Nepal.

== Biography ==
Curtis has released over 12 albums. His 1982 debut album, Gin & Raspberry, is recognised by the New Zealand Recording Industry Association as the best-selling New Zealand folk music album. His 2008 album Sea to Summit was a finalist for the 2009 Tui Award for the best New Zealand folk music album of the year.

He ran the Cardrona Folk Festival from 1977 to 2022, and in 2024 hosted the inaugural Earnscleugh Folk Festival. He is also responsible for organising many tours of New Zealand by top folk musicians, mainly from Britain, but including Eric Bogle from Australia and Jeremy Taylor from South Africa.

== Albums ==
- 1982: Gin & Raspberry
- 1985: Back from the Hills
- 1990: The Daisy Patch
- 1994: Save the Wilderness
- 1996: Off to the Dry Cardrona
- 1998: Below the High Country
- 2000: Let's Sing a Kiwi Song (children's album)
- 2002: Beyond a Climber's Moon
- 2004: Otago, My Home (DVD)
- 2008: Sea to Summit
- 2013: Live at Greendale
- 2017: Where the Peaks Meet the Skies
- 2018: High in the Himalaya
- 2018: The Sound of the Warning
