= Eric Bogle =

Scottish and Australian folk musician (born 1944)

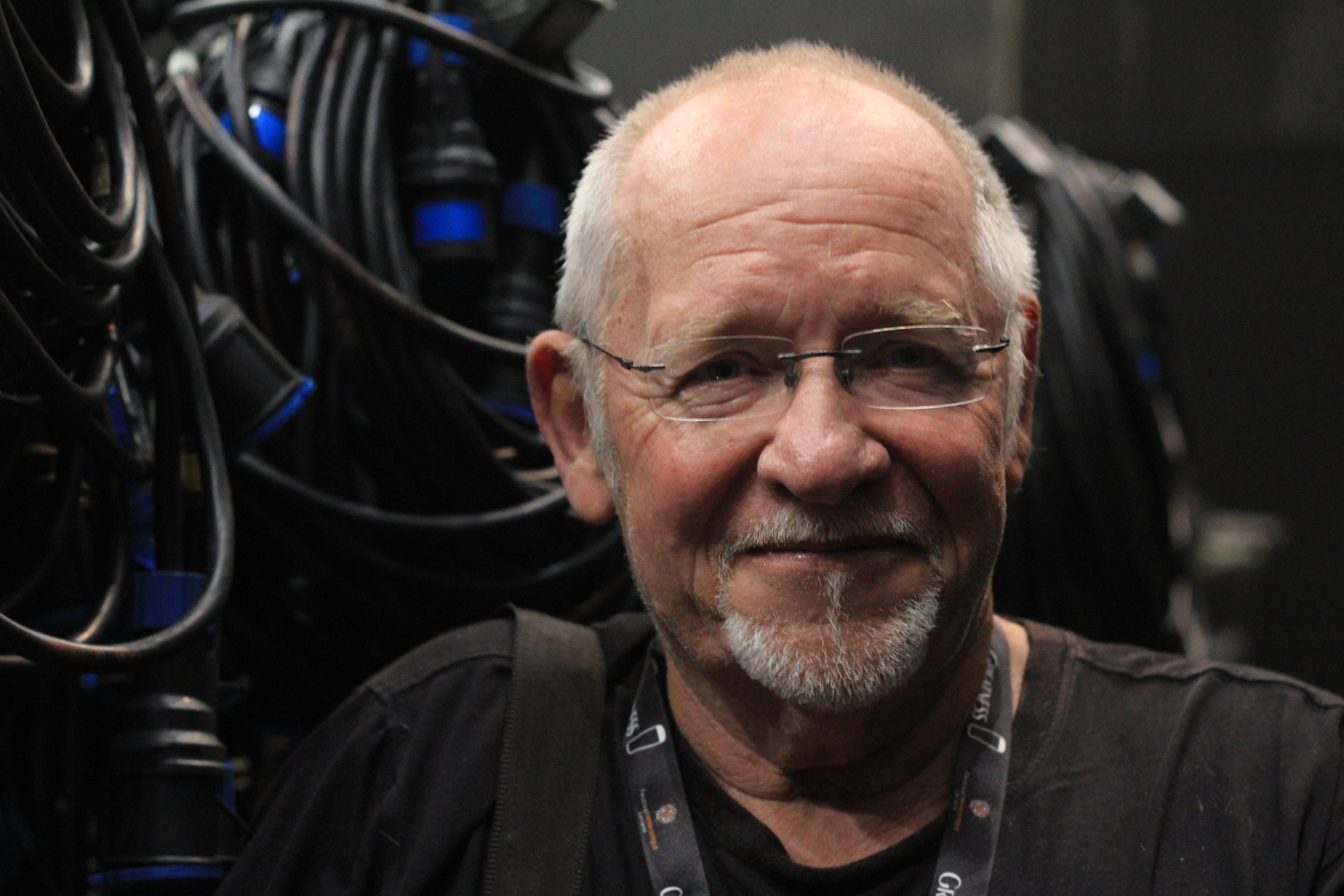
- Bogle during the Festival Interceltique de Lorient in 2016

Background information
- Born: 23 September 1944 (age 81); Peebles, Scotland
- Genres: Folk
- Occupations: Singer-songwriter, musician
- Instrument: Guitar
- Label: Rousabout

Eric Bogle (born 23 September 1944) is a Scottish and Australian folk singer-songwriter and musician. Born and raised in Scotland, he emigrated to Australia at the age of 25 to settle near Adelaide, South Australia. Bogle's songs have covered a variety of topics and have been performed by many artists. Two of his best known songs are "No Man's Land" (or "The Green Fields of France") and "And the Band Played Waltzing Matilda", with the latter named one of the APRA Top 30 Australian songs in 2001 as part of the celebrations for the Australasian Performing Right Association's 75th anniversary.

== Early years ==
Eric Bogle was born on 23 September 1944 in Peebles, Scotland. His father was a railway signalman who played the bagpipes. Bogle started writing poetry when he was eight years old. After attending school until he was sixteen, he worked in various trades: labourer, clerk and barman. In 1969, he emigrated to Australia and initially lived in the capital, Canberra, where he worked as an accountant. He had an interest in politics and by 1980 had moved to Queensland before settling in Adelaide.

== Career ==
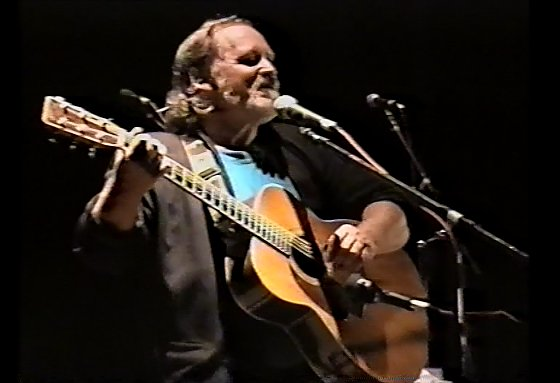
Bogle on stage at the 1994 Tamar Valley Folk Festival, George Town, Australia

Bogle taught himself to play guitar and joined a skiffle and rock band. He was the leader of Eric and the Informers in Scotland. His early influences were Lonnie Donegan, Elvis Presley and Ewan MacColl. He turned to folk music prior to emigrating to Australia – his first written songs concerned his parents. One of these, "Leaving Nancy", which sang of the day he left home for Australia, being the last time he saw his mother Nancy, was often covered, most notably by the Dubliners and the Fureys. When living in Canberra he joined the local folk music scene and performed occasionally.

Several of his most famous songs tell of the futility or loss of war. Prominent among these is "And The Band Played Waltzing Matilda", written in 1971, later covered by Joan Baez, the Pogues, June Tabor and many more. The lyrics recount the experiences of a member of the Australian and New Zealand Army Corps (ANZAC) at the Battle of Gallipoli. It has also been interpreted as a reaction to the Vietnam War.

Another of his best-known songs, "No Man's Land", is also World War I-themed. This song is commonly known as "The Green Fields of France", a title it was first given by the Fureys and which has subsequently been used in many further cover versions. The song refers to the traditional Scottish song "Flowers of the Forest" being played over the grave of a World War I soldier. Bogle deliberately gave the dead soldier an Irish name ("Willie McBride") as a counter to the anti-Irish sentiment prevalent in Britain during the 1970s. The song has been covered by Alex Beaton (with "A Scottish Soldier" from The Water is Wide), Plethyn ("Gwaed ar eu Dwylo" (Blood on their Hands), sung in Welsh from "Blas y Pridd"), Hannes Wader ("Es ist an der Zeit" (It is the Time)), and Dutch folk band Wolverlei as "14-18". American folk singer Charlie Zahm also has a version on his album Festival Favorites, as does American folk singer Robert Marr on his 2011 album Celticism. The lyrics from the song were referred to by former British prime minister Tony Blair in 2003 as his favourite anti-war poem.

"As if he Knows" (2001) widens the theme of the wastage of war to describe the sadness of Australian mounted soldiers in Palestine in 1918 as they are obliged to shoot their horses, "who asked so little and gave so much", before embarkation.

Another notable song on a similar theme, but with a more contemporary setting, is the Troubles-inspired "My Youngest Son Came Home Today", with its tale of a young man killed during fighting in Northern Ireland. Notably, the song does not take sides in the conflict; it does not mention whether the title character is a nationalist or loyalist. However, the song has been adopted by Nationalists and is now associated with Irish Republicanism. When Billy Bragg covered the song, on his 1990 album The Internationale, he changed the line "dreams of freedom unfulfilled" (which echoes the language of Nationalists) to "dreams of glory unfulfilled".

Bogle's songs cover a wide range of subjects and themes, including comedic songs ("The Aussie Bar-B-Q"), songs of real life emotion “Daniel Smiling “, The Enigma”, “One Small Star” and “ Now I'm Easy". Few would tackle a subject such as cerebral palsy, yet Eric knew the daughter of his friend Ray Smith and wrote “Rosie”, an endearing song where many find that they join in the chorus. His song "Safe in the Harbour" is an homage to Stan Rogers. "Katie and the Dreamtime Land" is a tribute to American folk singer Kate Wolf, who died from leukaemia in 1986. Other well-known songs, with lighter subject matter, include two homages to departed pets, "Little Gomez" and "Nobody's Moggy Now" and an acknowledgment of his folk music fans with "Do You Sing Any Dylan?".

In 2000 a five-CD collection, Singing The Spirit Home, was released. His first and only live performance DVD was released in May 2009.

== Touring ==
Bogle (left) with John Munro in Watford during their 2009 farewell tour

Bogle has undertaken an extensive concert tour of the UK (sometimes including appearances in continental Europe as well), every three years since 1985. These tours have usually included a supporting cast of Australian-based singers and musicians, most regularly John Munro and Brent Miller. Bogle said that his 2009 tour, with John Munro, would be his last overseas tour. This featured a Saturday Night Special on 27 June with Martyn Wyndham-Read, Johnny Collins and Les Sullivan in Watford, the closest venue to London.

More recent tours in Australia have included Adelaide-based musicians Emma Luker (fiddle) and Pete Titchener (guitar/bass)

Bogle was a prominent artist at the National Folk Festival in Canberra over Easter 2011 as well as a regular artist at the Port Fairy Folk Festival held in Port Fairy, Victoria, every March.

Many of Bogle's songs have been covered by other artists; including Joan Baez, Mr. Ian Stuart Donaldson & Stigger, John Schumann, Donovan, the Skids, June Tabor, the Men They Couldn't Hang, the Clancy Brothers, the Dubliners, John McDermott, Liam Clancy, Mike Harding, the Pogues, De Dannan, Dropkick Murphys, the Corries, Billy Bragg, the Bushwackers, Slim Dusty, Mary Black, the Fureys, and John Williamson. In May 2001 the Australasian Performing Right Association (APRA), as part of its 75th anniversary celebrations, named his song "And the Band Played Waltzing Matilda" as one of the Top 30 Australian songs of all time.

== Discography ==
=== Studio albums ===
Title	Album details	Peak chart positions
Title	Album details	AUS
Now I'm Easy	Released: 1980; Label: Larrikin Records (LRF041)	-
Plain & Simple (with John Munro)	Released: 1981; Label: Grass Roots (GR 172815)	-
Scraps of Paper (With John Munro and Brent Miller)	Released: September 1982; Label: Larrikin Records (LRF104)	84
When The Wind Blows (With John Munro and Brent Miller)	Released: July 1984; Label: Larrikin Records (LRF144)	78
Hard, Hard Times (With John Munro)	Released: 1985; Label: Folk Freak (FF-404018)	
The Anzacs (with Ted Egan, Judy Small, Nerys Evans and the Anzac Band & Singers)	Released: 1985; Label: Faces of Australia Series, ABC Records (TELP 1003)	—
Singing the Spirit Home	Released: November 1986; Label: Larrikin Records (LRF186)	96
Something of Value	Released: 1988; Label: Larrikin Records (LRF220)	—
Voices in the Wilderness	Released: 1990; Label: Larrikin Records (L 30413)	—
Mirrors	Released: 1993; Label: Larrikin Records (LRF 282)	—
The Emigrant & The Exile (with John Munro)	Released: 1996; Label: Larrikin Records (LRF478)	—
Small Miracles	Released: 1997; Label: Larrikin Records (LRF473)	—
Endangered Species	Released: 1999; Label: Acmec Records (ACMEC001)	—
The Colour of Dreams	Released: 2002; Label: Rouseabout Records (RRR33)	—
Other People's Children	Released: 2005; Label: Rouseabout Records (RRR39)	—
The Dreamer	Released: 2009; Label: Rouseabout Records (RRR47)	—
A Toss of the Coin (with John Munro)	Released: 2013; Label: Rouseabout Records (RRR61)	—
Voice (with John Munro)	Released: 2016; Label:	—
The Source of Light (with John Munro)	Released: 2021; Label: Greentrax	—

=== Live albums ===
Title	Album details	Peak chart positions
Title	Album details	AUS
In Person / Vol. 1 – Live in Person	Released: 1977 (Germany); Label: Autogram (ALLP-211); Note: Recorded live in Germany, February 1977	-
Vol. 2 – Down Under	Released: 1982 (Germany); Label: Autogram (ALLP-220); Note: Recorded live in Australia February & May 1977	-
Vol. 3 – Pure	Released: 1982 (Germany); Label: Autogram (ALLP-253); Note: Recorded in 1977	-
Eric Bogle In Concert (with John Munro & Brent Miller)	Released: 1985; Label: Larrikin Records (LRF160); Note: Recorded at the Octagon Theatre, Perth in August 1984.	-
I Wrote This Wee Song...	Released: 1994; Label: ABC Records (4797422; Note: Recorded live at the Adelaide Arts Theatre on 31 July 1993	-

=== Compilations ===
Title	Album details	Peak chart positions
Title	Album details	AUS
The Eric Bogle Songbook	Released: August 1986; Label: Axis (AX.701256)	-
The Eric Bogle Songbook Volume 2	Released: 1992; Label: Greentrax (CDTRAX 051)	-
The Gift of Years: Very Best of Eric Bogle	Released: 2000; Label: EMI (724352485123)	-
By Request	Released: 2001 (Europe); Label: Greentrax (CDTRAX 210)	-
Singing The Spirit Home	Released: 2001; Label: EMI (724353552022); Note: 5×CD set	-
At This Stage: The Live Collection	Released: 2005; Label: Greentrax (CDTRAX286)/Rouseabout Records (RRR38); Note: 2×CD set	-

=== Videos ===
Title	Album details	Peak chart positions
Title	Album details	AUS
Live at Stoneyfell Winery	Released: 2009; Label: Greentrax (DVTRAX2022); Recorded live at Stoneyfell Winery, Adelaide, on 1 March 2009	-

== Awards ==
On 25 January 1987, Bogle was appointed a Member of the Order of Australia "In recognition of service to the performing arts as a song writer and singer."

=== ARIA Music Awards ===
The ARIA Music Awards are an annual awards ceremony that recognises excellence, innovation and achievement across all genres of Australian music. They commenced in 1987.

Year	Nominee / work	Award	Result	Ref.
1989	Something of Value	Best Independent Release	Nominated	

=== Mo Awards ===
The Australian Entertainment Mo Awards (commonly known informally as the Mo Awards), were annual Australian entertainment industry awards. They recognised achievements in live entertainment in Australia from 1975 to 2016. Bogle won one award in that time.

Year	Nominee / work	Award	Result (wins only)
1990	Eric Bogle	Folk Performer of the Year	Won

=== National Folk Festival ===
Year	Nominee / work	Award	Result (wins only)
2019	Eric Bogle	Lifetime Achievement Award	awarded

=== Tamworth Songwriters Association ===
The Tamworth Songwriters Association (TSA) is an annual songwriting contest for original country songs, awarded in January at the Tamworth Country Music Festival. They commenced in 1986. Bogle has won three awards.

Year	Nominee / work	Award	Result (wins only)
1987	Eric Bogle	Songmaker Award	awarded
1988	Eric Bogle	Tex Morton Award	awarded
1991	"Silly Slang Song" by Eric Bogle	Comedy/Novelty Song of the Year	Won

== Bibliography ==
- Walsh, Michael J. K. (2018). Eric Bogle, music and the Great War : 'An old man's tears'. Abingdon; New-York: Routledge. p. 179. ISBN 9781138719118.
