= Port Fairy Folk Festival =

The Port Fairy Folk Festival is an annual four-day music festival based in the historic fishing village of Port Fairy in Victoria, Australia.

== History ==
The festival began on 2 December 1977 under the theme of "Australian and Irish Traditional Music" exploring traditional music and culture. The festival was founded by Jamie McKew leading a small group of folk music performers and supporters from Geelong and Melbourne. It was with a sense of social justice, that led Jamie to create the festival. “Folk songs were socially significant, they had meaning to them. The songs were fun, but they also had a purpose. I wasn’t marching on the streets, but I’d always had a strong sense of social justice.”

The focus moved to "World Roots and Acoustic Music" in the early 1980s and has subsequently broadened to include a diverse range of genres, styles and influences. The 40th edition of the festival was held in March 2016 with McKew as festival director. The leadership transitioned to Caroline Moore as program director in 2017.

The festival now takes place annually over the Labour Day long weekend and has been produced by the Port Fairy Folk Festival Committee Incorporated which has been in Port Fairy since 1992.

The 2021 festival was cancelled for the year due to the COVID-19 pandemic. The festival returned in 2022, from 11 to 14 March, and has continued since.

Artists and bands that have performed at the festival include Billy Bragg, Eric Bogle, John Williamson, Ted Egan, Ani Di Franco, Margret RoadKnight, Colin Hay, Kavisha Mazzella, Zulya Kamalova, Mike Rudd, Weddings Parties Anything, Blue Grassy Knoll, Anam, Tiddas, Lior, Christine Anu, Eric Bibb, Luka Bloom, Shane Howard, Joe Camilleri, The Black Sorrows, John McCutcheon, Mills Sisters, David Essig, Clive Gregson, Christine Collister, Butch Hancock, Jimmie Dale Gilmore, Judy Small, Joe Dolce, and Roaring Jack.
