= John Schumann and the Vagabond Crew =

Australian folk group

- Origin: Adelaide, South Australia, Australia
- Genre: Folk
- Years active: 2005–present
- Label: ABC Music
- Spinoff of: Redgum
- Members: John Schumann; Matt McNamee; Rohan Powell; Anthony Thyer; Jamie Harrison; Ioannis Politis; Julian Ferraretto; Mark Kraus
- Past members: Michael Atkinson; Shane Howard; Marcia Howard; Russell Morris; Rob Hirst; Mike Rudd; Broderick Smith; Dave Folley; Hugh McDonald; Kat Kraus; Alex Black; Sam Willoughby

John Schumann and the Vagabond Crew are an Australian folk group formed in Adelaide in 2005. The band's name is taken from a line in Henry Lawson's poem "Knocking Around". Since it was founded a number of Australian musicians have been involved. The formation of the group marked the return of John Schumann, former Redgum frontman to regular performances and recording.

== Recordings ==
As of 2013, the band has released two albums. Both have consisted of either cover songs or poems set to music. The first, Lawson, was a collection of Henry Lawson poems put to music. This marked the first collaboration between John Schumann, Hugh McDonald, and Michael Atkinson since Schumann left Redgum back in 1986.

Their second album was Behind the Lines, an album based largely around the theme of Australians at war. It also featured Hugh McDonald, although Michael Atkinson did not participate. Their third album, Ghosts and Memories, was released in 2018 featuring a number of songs commissioned over the years - including On Every Anzac Day, commissioned by LTGEN David Morrison then Chief of Army. The album also featured Graduation Day, a song revealing the price paid by Australia’s police men and women In April 2025 John and The Vagabond Crew released the single “Fishing Net in the Rain” following the Royal Commission into Veteran Suicide. Co-written with Schumann’s manager, Ivan Tanner, the song is based on Petty Officer David Finney. The Vagabond Crew continues to tour and record, regarded as an accomplished a compelling concert act.

== Other activities ==
The band provided the music for "Lawson", a one-man stage show by Max Cullen based on the life of Henry Lawson. They played in Vietnam to mark the 40th anniversary of the Battle of Long Tan, the most famous engagement involving Australians during the Vietnam War.

The group has played many concerts and festivals, especially around Anzac Day.

They have also played overseas for Australian forces several times. In December 2009 they visited East Timor to play for Australian and New Zealand troops stationed there, in September–October 2011 they played for Australian troops in Afghanistan and in July 2013 they played for Australian troops and Australian Federal Police in the Solomon Islands. Schumann and McDonald travelled to Dar Es Salaam to perform for the crew of HMAS Darwin on Anzac Day in 2014. In 2016, the band returned to the Middle East to play for troops serving in the UAE and Kabul in Afghanistan. John Schumann and the Vagabond Crew performed the Lawson album with the Adelaide Symphony Orchestra in the Adelaide Festival Theatre in September 2022, the 100th anniversary of Lawson’s death. The concert featured a narrative written by Schumann and his erstwhile Australian Literature teacher and friend, Professor Brian Matthews. The narrative was delivered by actor Richard Roxburgh.

== Discography ==
=== Studio albums ===
- Lawson (2005)
- Behind the Lines (2008)
- Ghosts and Memories (2018)
