= Michael Atkinson (composer) =

Australian musician and composer

- Born: Michael Atkinson; Australia
- Genres: Rock, Australian folk
- Occupations: Singer, songwriter, guitarist, composer
- Instrument: horn
- Years active: 1975–present
- Labels: Larrikin, CBS, Epic, Columbia, Sony

Michael Atkinson is an Australian musician and composer, known for being a member of the band Redgum.

== Career ==
Atkinson was a member of Redgum from 1975 to 1987. While with Redgum he wrote many of the band's songs, and with Michael Spicer, who had joined the band later as a keyboardist, also wrote the score for the film A Street to Die.

After leaving Redgum, he worked as a composer on Australian films, including Backlash (1986), The Last Man Hanged (1993), and the Russell Crowe film Heaven's Burning (1997), and television series, including the popular police drama Blue Heelers. His score for Stan and George's New Life was nominated for the 1991 AACTA Award for Best Original Music Score.

In 2005, with other former members of Redgum and other Australian bands reunited as John Schumann and the Vagabond Crew, he recorded Lawson, poems by Henry Lawson set to music.

== Awards and nominations ==
=== ARIA Music Awards ===
The ARIA Music Awards is an annual awards ceremony held by the Australian Recording Industry Association. They commenced in 1987.

Year	Nominee / work	Award	Result	Ref.
1994	Snowy (with Michael Easton)	Best Original Soundtrack, Cast or Show Album	Nominated	
