= Against the Grain (Redgum album) =

Greatest hits album by Redgum
- Released: 2004
- Genre: Folk
- Label: Epic

Redgum chronology
The Very Best of Redgum (1987)	Against the Grain (2004)	The Essential Redgum (2011)

Against the Grain is a greatest hits album from the Australian folk-rock group Redgum.

As of 2012, it is one of only three Redgum albums available on CD, the others being Caught in the Act, and another best of album, The Essential Redgum.

== Track listing ==
1. "Poor Ned"
2. "Killing Floor"
3. "Servin' USA"
4. "Maria"
5. "Ted"
6. "Long Run"
7. "Brown Rice and Kerosene"
8. "Yarralumla Wine"
9. "The Last Frontier"
10. "Where Ya Gonna Run To"
11. "Fabulon"
12. "The Diamantina Drover"
13. "I Was Only 19 (A Walk In The Light Green)"
14. "I've been to Bali Too"
15. "ASIO"
16. "Spirit of the Land"
17. "Gladstone Pier"
18. "Still Life"
19. "Just Another Moment On Your Own"
