= Music Farm Studio =

Recording studio in Australia

Music Farm Studio is a recording studio set on a large property near Byron Bay in New South Wales, Australia. It is known for having had many musicians recording their music there from the 1980s onwards, including Kylie Minogue, Olivia Newton-John, Cold Chisel, Yothu Yindi, Midnight Oil, Redgum, Mental As Anything, and Goanna. Established in 1979 by producer and studio designer John Sayers, it was refurbished in the 1990s and passed through several private owners before being sold in 2017 and turned back into a commercial studio.

== History ==
Music Farm Studio was established by musician Gary Deutsche after buying the property in 1976 as a working dairy farm called The Fig Tree Inn.

The original studio was built in 1979 by New Zealand-born Australian recording engineer, producer, and studio designer John Sayers. It was equipped with a 24-track MCI 500 recording console and known for its rich acoustics.

Radio and broadcasting entrepreneur Eric Roberts refurbished the studios during the 1990s and expanded the console to its full capacity of 42 inputs, as well as adding new effects units and Pro Tools. Greg Courtney became director of the studio.

In 2001 Roberts sold the property Suzi Dowling for around A$1.5m, who sold it to photographer Martin Kantor (nephew of Rupert Murdoch) and artist Tanya Hoddinott for around A$3m in 2010. In 2017 it again changed hands, for around the same price, and has since been converted back into recording studios.

== Description and current use ==
Music Farm Studio is a well-equipped recording studio situated on a 4.5-hectare (11-acre) property near Coorabell, in the hinterland of Byron Bay, New South Wales. The property also includes several other dwellings and provides luxury accommodation.

Musician and producer Chris Collins has used the studio to produce the music of many contemporary artists.

== Significance ==
In 2021 Mixdown magazine listed it as one of "The 10 most important Australian recording studios of the 20th century".

Many famous musicians have recorded their music in the studio, including Kylie Minogue, Olivia Newton-John, Jimmy Barnes (in Cold Chisel), Richard Clapton, Yothu Yindi, Pete Murray, Midnight Oil, The Radiators, Tommy Emmanuel, Mi-Sex, Redgum, Mental As Anything, Goanna, and Tash Sultana.
