= Judy Small =

Australian former singer

- Born: Judith Margaret Small; 26 March 1953 (age 73); Coffs Harbour, New South Wales, Australia
- Occupations: Singer; songwriter; musician; lawyer; judge
- Years active: Late 1970 – 2013, 2021-2024(music); Lawyer (1998–2020)
- Works: A Natural Selection 1982; Ladies & Gems 1984; Mothers, Daughters, Wives 1984; The ANZACS (with Ted Egan, Eric Bogle, Nery Evans and Thee ANZAC Band and Singers); One Voice in the Crowd 1985; Home Front 1988; Snapshot 1990; Second Wind 1993; Global Village 1995; Three Sheila's (with Kavisha Mazzella and Bronwyn Calcutt) 1997; Let the Rainbow Shine 1999; Mosaic 2003; Live at the Artery 2007; There are also two compilations: The Best of the 80s/The Best of Judy Small 1993 and Never Turning Back 1998
- Spouse: Charlotte Stockwell
- Awards: MO award Folk Artist of the Year 1990; Member of the Order of Australia for significant contribution to folk music 2013

Judith Margaret Small AM is an Australian former folk music singer, songwriter and musician, and retired judge of the Federal Circuit Court of Australia. As a performer she has been hailed as "The Grande Dame of Australian Folk Music".

During her singing career Judy was known for her feminist and political songs, usually following a traditional theme. She produced thirteen studio albums and one double live album, hundreds of songs and has been described as being among the most popular political singers in Australia, with many of her songs based on topical factual events like Anzac Day, the redevelopment of a favourite beachside property in her home town of Coffs Harbour, and the Montreal Massacre. She enjoys singing about real people and issues, stating "If an audience comes away thinking about the issues I raise, that's a worthwhile concert, but only if they come away thinking about the issues and having had a really good time is it a successful performance". She toured the country and internationally, playing primarily in clubs and pubs, and at various folk festivals and conventions.

== Biography ==
Judy Small, now based in Melbourne was born in Coffs Harbour, New South Wales. She moved to Sydney in 1972, studying psychology and began her career as a singer and songwriter in the early 1970s, inspired by the folk revival boom of the 1960s and describing her influences as such folk singers as Joan Baez, Peter, Paul and Mary and The Seekers.

One of her successful ballads is "The White Bay Paper Seller", based on newspaper seller and Sydney icon Beatrice Bush. Apart from her own repertoire she is a renowned interpreter of song both traditional and contemporary.

After an informal performance at the Vancouver Folk Music Festival in 1982, where she sang “Mothers, Daughters, Wives”, now perhaps her most well-known song, she became a full-time singer-songwriter. Over the next 16 years, she regularly toured throughout the United States, Canada, the United Kingdom, Denmark, Australia and New Zealand.

In 1990, she received the "Mo" Award - Mo Awards for Australian Folk Performer of the Year and in 1997 was the Port Fairy Folk Festival Artist of the Year. She was also invited to Beijing for the United Nations Women's Conference NGO Forum - UN in 1995, where she sang to thousands of women from all over the world.

People had been asking for some years for Judy to release an album recorded live, so they could hear her introductions and the stories of her songs, which have become as much a part of her show as the songs themselves, so a concert was recorded at The Artery in Melbourne, and subsequently released as a double CD Collection set, "Live at the Artery" spanning her 35-plus years of music.

Judy Small retired from full-time performance in 1998. She became a family lawyer in Melbourne working in private practice for 6 years before joining Victoria Legal Aid in 2004, but continued to write new songs and to perform regularly. In March 2013, she was appointed as a Judge with the Federal Circuit Court of Australia, and retired from performing, saying that “judges don't have political opinions that they express in public”. Judy retired from the Bench in April 2020 and sang occasionally until the end of 2024, when she retired from performing altogether for health reasons.

She lives in Melbourne with her wife Charlotte Stockwell whom she married in Wānaka, New Zealand on 10 May 2014.

Judy was Co-Chair and then Chair of Midsumma Festival, Australia's pre-eminent LGBTQIA+ arts organisation, from September 2019 to May 2025. She currently sits on the board of family counselling and education organisation Better Place Australia.

== Music ==
Judy Small's songs cover a wide range of topics and styles, especially social justice, equity and harmony with a particular emphasis on feminism and peace. Among the most popular are "Mothers, Daughters, Wives", "Women of Our Time", "One Voice in the Crowd" and "Global Village".

Her songs have been recorded by numerous artists including Ronnie Gilbert, Eric Bogle, Charlie King and Priscilla Herdman and Scottish folk groups such as The McCalmans and The Corries. Several of her recordings have been translated to a number of languages.

== Discography ==
- A Natural Selection (1982)
- Mothers, Daughters, Wives (1984)
- Ladies and Gems (1984)
- One Voice in the Crowd (1985)
- The Anzacs (with Ted Egan, Eric Bogle, Nerys Evans and the Anzac Band & Singers) (1985)
- Home Front (1988)
- Snapshot (1990)
- Best of Judy Small (1992)
- Second Wind (1993)
- Global Village (1995)
- Three Sheilas (1997)
- Let the Rainbow Shine (1999)
- Never Turning Back (2001)
- Mosaic (2003)
- Judy Small: Live at The Artery (2006) (double 2 CD disc, recorded live in Melbourne)

== Awards and recognition ==
In 1995, Small was invited to Beijing for the United Nations Women's Conference NGO Forum. In 1997 she was the Port Fairy Folk Festival Artist of the Year. In 2006, Australian Rhymes Magazine named her club/pub entertainer/performer of the year.

In June 2013 she was made a Member of the Order of Australia (AM) for her contribution to folk music.

In 2023 she was awarded the Lifetime Achievement Award at the National Lifetime Achievement Award.

She was inducted onto the Victorian Honour Roll of Women in 2024.

=== Australian Entertainment Awards ===
The Australian Entertainment Mo Awards (commonly known informally as the Mo Awards), were annual Australian entertainment industry awards. They recognise achievements in live entertainment in Australia from 1975 to 2016.

Year	Nominee / work	Award	Result (wins only)
1989	Judy Small	Folk Performer of the Year	Won

=== Australian Women in Music Awards ===
The Australian Women in Music Awards is an annual event that celebrates outstanding women in the Australian Music Industry who have made significant and lasting contributions in their chosen field. They commenced in 2018.

Year	Nominee / work	Award	Result
2026	Judy Small	Lifetime Achievement Award	Nominated
