= Hugh McDonald (Australian musician) =

Australian rock musician (1954–2016)

- Born: 17 July 1954; Cowell, South Australia, Australia
- Died: 18 November 2016 (aged 62)
- Genres: Rock, Australian folk, folk rock
- Occupations: Musician, singer, songwriter, guitarist
- Years active: 1970s–2016
- Labels: CBS, Epic, Columbia, Sony
- Website: hughmcdonald.com

Hugh McDonald (17 July 1954 – 18 November 2016) was an Australian musician. Active from the 1970s to 2016, he performed and recorded with the Bushwackers, the Sundowners, Banshee, Redgum, Des "Animal" McKenna, Moving Cloud and the Colonials.

McDonald became better known when he joined the folk-rock group Redgum in 1981. He wrote a number of the group's songs, including "The Diamantina Drover". After lead singer John Schumann left the band in 1986, he took over as lead singer until the group disbanded in 1990.

After Redgum, McDonald continued playing and recording music, and also taught music, including working with the Geelong Music College Orchestra. In addition, he had his recording studios in Melbourne.

McDonald also lent his musical and recording expertise to the production of the Poowong Consolidated Primary School's annual music CD and more recently DVD. He worked alongside the students and music teacher Phil Beggs to compose, write, record and produce the CD.

From 2005 McDonald worked with Schumann again as part of the Vagabond Crew, touring and performing on the albums Lawson and Behind the Lines. The latter album was recorded at McDonald's Studios.

McDonald performed for Australian forces overseas several times. In December 2009 he visited East Timor to play for Australian and New Zealand troops stationed there, in September–October 2011 he played for Australian troops in Afghanistan and in July 2013 he played for Australian troops and Australian Federal Police in the Solomon Islands. In 2014 he played for the Royal Australian Navy troops in Tanzania, Africa, and in March 2016 he returned to Afghanistan to play for Australian troops.

In 2014 McDonald released his third solo album, titled The Land, which includes his more recent originals "If It All Goes South", a tender heartfelt song which he wrote for his wife, Rebecca Harris Mason, and "Shrodinger's Cat", a contemplative song about accepting the uncertainties of life.

McDonald had seven children, six grandchildren and lived with his wife, pianist Rebecca Harris Mason, and his two stepchildren. His daughter, Georgia, is also a musician who formerly sang and played guitar in Melbourne band Camp Cope, before they broke up.

Hugh McDonald died on 18 November 2016 from complications of prostate cancer at the age of 62.

== Discography ==
=== Albums ===
Title	Details
The Lawson Album	Released: 1993; Label: ABC Music; Format: CD
Spirit of the Land	Released: 2004; Label: Hugh McDonald; Format: CD, DD
The Land	Released: July 2014; Label: Hugh McDonald; Format: CD, DD
Bush Shenanigans	Released: 2017; Label: Hugh McDonald; Format: CD, DD, streaming

=== Other singles ===
List of singles as featured artist, with selected chart positions
Title	Year	Peak chart positions
Title	Year	AUS
"The Garden" (as Australia Too)	1985	22
