= Redgum =

Australian folk band (1975–1990)

- Origin: Adelaide, South Australia, Australia
- Genres: Folk, rock
- Years active: 1975–1990
- Labels: Larrikin, Epic, Columbia
- Spinoffs: John Schumann and the Vagabond Crew
- Past members: Michael Atkinson; John Schumann; Verity Truman; Chris Timms; Gordon McLean; Tom Stehlik; Russell Coleman; Dave Flett; Hugh McDonald; Stephen Cooney; Brian Czempinski; Michael Spicer; James Spicer; Tim Hannaford; Bruce Barry

Redgum were an Australian folk and political music group formed in Adelaide in 1975 by singer-songwriters John Schumann and Michael Atkinson on guitars/vocals, and Verity Truman on flute/vocals; they were later joined by Hugh McDonald on fiddle and Chris Timms on violin. All four had been students at Flinders University and together developed a strong political voice. They are best known for their protest song exploring the impact of war in the 1980s "I Was Only 19", which peaked at No. 1 on the national singles charts. The song is in the Australasian Performing Right Association (APRA) list of Top 30 of All Time Best Australian Songs created in 2001.

Redgum also covered Australian consumer influences on surrounding nations in 1984's "I've Been to Bali Too", both hit singles were written by Schumann. "The Diamantina Drover", written by Timms' replacement, violinist/vocalist Hugh McDonald and "Poor Ned", written by Trevor Lucas of Fairport Convention, are examples of their bush songs. Lucas produced their May 1983 live album Caught in the Act, which peaked at No. 5 on the national albums chart. Schumann left the band and pursued a solo career from 1986, Atkinson left in 1987 and Redgum finally disbanded in 1990.

From 2005, Schumann and McDonald performed together as part of John Schumann and the Vagabond Crew.

== History ==
Redgum was formed in 1975 when three students at Flinders University, John Schumann, Michael Atkinson and Verity Truman collaborated for a musical assessment piece for their Politics and Art course. The trio quickly gained fame around the university community for their forthright songs, and by 1976 had been joined by violinist Chris Timms who had previously attended Flinders University.

The group were soon in demand for parties, pubs and rallies throughout South Australia and Victoria. On the first album, If You Don't Fight You Lose (1978) Redgum showed it was one of the few Australian bands prepared to tackle domestic politics and culture. "One More Boring Night in Adelaide" for some will remain, despite some of its dated references, a classic analysis of Australian provincial parochialism. Initially a part-time band, performing weekends and school holidays (two members were teachers), it was only after they released their second album, Virgin Ground (late 1980), to strong sales and critical acclaim, that the group became full-time and started touring nationally. On 14 October 1979, Redgum appeared, along with the bands Small Axe and Hit 'n' Run and the feminist circus troupe Wimmin's Circus, at an Anti-Uranium Benefit concert, in support of trade union bans on uranium mining, at the Caulfield Institute of Technology at Caulfield, Melbourne.

The group's success continued to grow with the release of their next three albums, Virgin Ground, Brown Rice and Kerosine (1981) and the EP Cut to the Quick (September 1982), and they weathered several line-up changes including the addition of a didgeridoo and the replacement of Timms in May 1982 with Hugh McDonald, among others. They released a songbook The Redgum Songbook: Stubborn Words, Flagrant Vices (1981).

1983's Caught in the Act.

Collaboration with influential Australian folk producer Trevor Lucas (from UK folk group Fairport Convention) brought the high-point of their career – the live LP Caught in the Act was released in May 1983 and "I Was Only 19" aka "A Walk in the Light Green" (March 1983) hit number one on the Australian singles chart. The song precipitated a Royal Commission into the use and effects of chemical agents in the Vietnam War by the Australian military. The album included "The Diamantina Drover" and "The Last Frontier" which are indicative of their folk music style.

The band released their next LP, Frontline (June 1984) with its single "I've Been to Bali Too", and started touring folk venues in the UK and Europe with some success. Late in 1985, Schumann announced that he had signed a solo deal with CBS Records and would be quitting. Redgum released one more album of new material, Midnight Sun (1986), and a last single "Roll it on Robbie" (1987) after which Atkinson left. There were plans to release another album but this did not occur. The album was recorded at Warrenwood in Melbourne but never released due to the studio going into liquidation. The remaining members who recorded this album Hugh McDonald, Verity Truman, Michael Spicer, James Spicer and Tim Hannaford performed until 1990, when the band's considerable debts were cleared. After this was achieved Redgum disbanded.

== Band members post-Redgum ==
After leaving the band, Schumann released two solo albums before pursuing a brief political career, standing for the South Australian seat of Mayo in the 1998 federal election and losing by a small margin. He was later employed by the Democrats as a staffer. He left the Democrats in 2000 and returned to further solo works. Schumann returned to recording in 2005 with the Vagabond Crew (which included fellow Redgum member Hugh McDonald) and new albums were released in 2005 and 2008.

Chris Timms left to further a career in Adult Education within the Dept. of TAFE in South Australia. He was active within the Australian Labor Party for a time.

Other members of Redgum continue to work in the Australian music scene. Atkinson has worked in film and television. He composed the music for films including Heaven's Burning (1997), starring Russell Crowe.

Truman performs in Adelaide as a longtime member of cabaret/cover band CrossRoads.

In 2005, Redgum was again brought to attention through the recording of an acoustic / hip hop cover of "I Was Only 19" by Australian group The Herd with Schumann providing some vocals. The song received high rotation on popular national radio station Triple J. Michael Spicer is currently teaching MIDI, Synthesis & Composition in Singapore Polytechnic.

Hugh McDonald died of cancer on 19 November 2016 at the age of 62.

== Members ==
In chronological order:

- John Schumann (vocals, guitar) 1975–1985
- Michael Atkinson (songwriting, bass, mandolin, piano, vocals) 1975–1987
- Verity Truman (vocals, flute, tin whistle) 1975–1990
- Chris Timms (violin, backing vocals) 1975–1982
- Bruce Barry (bass, guitar) 1975
- Chris Boath (bass guitar) 1978–1979
- Gordon McLean (drums) 1978–1979
- Tom Stehlik (drums) 1981
- David Flett (bass guitar) 1980–1983
- Geoff Gifford (drums) 1980–1982
- Russel Coleman (drums) 1982–1983
- Hugh McDonald (guitar, violin, vocals) 1982–1990
- Michael Spicer (keyboards, flute) 1983–1990
- Brian Czempinski (drums) 1984–1986
- Stephen Cooney (bass guitar, didgeridoo, guitar, mandolin, banjo) 1984–1985
- Andy Baylor (guitar, fiddle) 1986
- Peter Bolke (bass guitar) 1986
- Ray Rafael (drums) 1986–1989
- Darren Deland Darren (bass guitar, vocals) 1987–1988
- Louis McManus (guitar) 1987?
- Malcolm Wakeford (drums) 1987?
- Bob Sender Bob (guitar) 1987?
- James Spicer (drums/vocals) 1988–90
- Tim Hannaford (bass guitar/vocals) 1989–90

== Discography ==
=== Studio albums ===
Year	Title	Peak chart positions
Year	Title	AUS Kent
1978	If You Don't Fight You Lose: Released: 1978; Format: LP, cassette; Label: Larrikin (LRF 037)	—
1980	Virgin Ground: Released: 1980; Format: LP, cassette; Label: Epic (ELPS 4137)	53
1981	Brown Rice and Kerosine: Released: 1981; Format: LP, cassette; Label: Epic (ELPS 4257)	48
1984	Frontline: Released: June 1984; Format: LP, cassette; Label: Epic (ELPS 4428)	18
1986	Midnight Sun: Released: November 1986; Format: LP, cassette; Label: Epic (ELPS 4570)	77

=== Live albums ===
Year	Title	Peak chart positions	Certification
Year	Title	AUS Kent	Certification
1983	Caught in the Act: Released: May 1983; Format: LP, cassette; Label: Epic (ELPS 4371)	5	AUS: Gold
2017	Live in Melkweg, Amsterdam 1985: Released: November 2017; Format: CD (limited), DD, streaming; Label: Mark Williams, Black Box Records/ MGM Distribution	—	

=== Compilation albums ===
Year	Title	Peak chart positions
Year	Title	AUS Kent
1985	Redgum's Greatest: Everything's Legal – Anything Goes: Released: November 1985; Format: LP, cassette; Label: Epic (ELPS 4512)	49
1987	The Very Best of Redgum: Released: August 1987; Format: LP, cassette; Label: J&B (JB 305)	37
2004	Against the Grain: Released: 2004; Format: CD; Label: Columbia (5190092000)	—
2011	The Essential Redgum: Released: 2011; Format: CD, digital download; Label: Sony (88697764442)	—

=== Extended plays ===
Year	Title
1982	Cut to the Quick: Released: September 1982; Format: LP; Label: Epic (EX 12020)
1988	4 Play Vol 19: Released: March 1988; Format: LP, CD; Label: Epic (651093)

=== Singles ===
Year	Title	Peak chart positions	Certification	Album
Year	Title	AUS	Certification	Album
Jan 1981	"The Long Run"	—		Virgin Ground
Nov 1981	"100 Years On"	—		Brown Rice and Kerosine
1982	"Working Girls"	—		Cut to the Quick
March 1983	"I Was Only 19"	1	ARIA: 3× Platinum	Caught in the Act
Aug 1983	"Long Run" (re-release)	—		Virgin Ground
March 1984	"I've Been to Bali Too"	16		Frontline
June 1984	"Friday Night"	82		Frontline
1984	"A.S.I.O."	—		Frontline
May 1985	"The Drover's Dog"	20		Redgum's Greatest: Everything's Legal – Anything Goes
October 1985	"Just Another Moment on Your Own"	—		Redgum's Greatest: Everything's Legal – Anything Goes
October 1986	"Running with the Hurricane"	—		Midnight Sun
May 1987	"Roll It on Robbie"	34		The Very Best of Redgum

== Awards ==
=== Country Music Awards of Australia ===
The Country Music Awards of Australia (CMAA) (also known as the Golden Guitar Awards) is an annual awards night held in January during the Tamworth Country Music Festival, celebrating recording excellence in the Australian country music industry. They have been held annually since 1973.

Year	Nominee / work	Award	Result
1984	"I Was Only 19" (written by John Schumann)	Top Selling Song of the Year	Won
1984	"I Was Only 19" (written by John Schumann)	APRA Song of the Year	Won

=== Mo Awards ===
The Australian Entertainment Mo Awards (commonly known informally as the Mo Awards), were annual Australian entertainment industry awards. They recognise achievements in live entertainment in Australia from 1975 to 2016. Redgum won two awards in that time.

Year	Nominee / work	Award	Result (wins only)
1984	Redgum	Country Showgroup of the Year	Won
1987	Redgum	Country Showgroup of the Year	Won
