= John Schumann =

Australian musician (born 1953)

John Schumann AM
- Schumann in 2026

Background information
- Born: John Lewis Schumann; 18 May 1953 (age 73); North Adelaide, South Australia, Australia
- Genre: Australian folk
- Occupations: Musician; singer; songwriter; guitarist; politician
- Years active: 1975–current
- Labels: ABC Music; Larrikin; CBS; Epic; Columbia; Sony
- Website: schumann.com.au

John Lewis Schumann AM (born 18 May 1953) is an Australian singer-songwriter and guitarist from Adelaide. He is best known as the lead singer for the folk group Redgum, with their chart-topping hit "I Was Only 19 (A Walk in the Light Green)", a song exploring the psychological and medical side-effects of serving in the Australian forces during the Vietnam War. The song's sales assisted Vietnam Veterans during the 1983 Royal Commission into the effects of Agent Orange and other chemical defoliants employed during the war. Schumann was an Australian Democrats candidate in the 1998 federal election, narrowly failing to unseat Australian Foreign Minister Alexander Downer for the Division of Mayo.

Since 2005 he has been performing as part of John Schumann and the Vagabond Crew, including fellow ex-Redgum member Hugh McDonald.

== Biography ==
=== 1975–1985: Redgum ===
Schumann was born on 18 May 1953 and attended Blackfriars Priory School, and then Flinders University studying philosophy, English and drama for his Bachelor of Arts. In 1975 he contributed to a radical politics in art project, convened by Professor Brian Medlin with fellow students Michael Atkinson and Verity Truman. The three students went on to form political folk band Redgum and began performing in local pubs and campuses. An 'underground recording' of their music was made at the Australian Broadcasting Corporation (ABC) studios in Adelaide by Darc Cassidy – the tapes went on to become popular on campuses across Australia and on independent radio. Chris Timms (also from Flinders University) joined the group in 1976 and they toured to Melbourne as a part-time group. Schumann was by then teaching English and Drama at Marion High School and performing on weekends and school holidays. By December 1980, they decided to become a full-time band. Schumann wrote their biggest hits including "Long Run", "The Last Frontier", "I Was Only Nineteen" (March 1983) and "I've Been to Bali Too" (1984). In 1985 Redgum toured overseas performing at major festivals across England and Europe including the Edinburgh Festival and in war torn Belfast in Northern Ireland. The band had a strong following in Scandinavia. He has now written a picture book with the lyrics of "I was only Nineteen" [Written by Schumann, J. and illustrated by Craig Smith (2014) I was Only Nineteen. 1st Ed., ALLEN & UNWIN]. And has got a book coming out about police mental health.

=== 1985–1993: Early solo music career ===
Schumann left Redgum (late 1985) due to continual pressure to tour and to spend more time with his young family in the Adelaide Hills returned to teaching at Reynella East Primary School. He embarked upon a solo career with CBS, where he released several records, including Etched in Blue (1987), and a children's record, Looby Loo (1989). The 1987 single "Borrowed Ground" from Etched in Blue was given the Australasian Performing Right Association (APRA) Most Performed Australasian Country Work Award in 1988. In 1992 he recorded a single for Sony titled "Eyes on Fire", this was followed by an album for Columbia Records in 1993, True Believers.

=== 1998–2001: Political career ===
Schumann used his public profile and became involved in social justice issues: rallying against Queensland's Premier Joh Bjelke-Petersen; the 'Save The Franklin River' campaign including as a member of Gordon Franklin & the Wilderness Ensemble (contained members of Goanna and Redgum) to record a single "Let the Franklin Flow" in 1983 and seeking justice and compensation for Vietnam Veterans in the 1980s and 1990s.

In 1998 Schumann accepted an appointment as the chief of staff for the then leader of the Australian Democrats, Meg Lees. He stood against Australian Foreign Minister Alexander Downer for the Division of Mayo in Adelaide, winning 22.4% of the primary vote to Downer's 45.6%, taking the vote to preferences. After the distribution of preferences, Downer held the seat 51.7% to Schumann's 48.3%. Despite coming close to winning the seat, Schumann decided not to contest the seat in the 2001 election, citing a number of reasons including family commitments and the Democrats' decision to remove Lees as party leader in favour of Natasha Stott Despoja in April 2001.

=== 2001–current: later career ===
Schumann is a co-director of Schumann & Associates – a communications, public relations and consultancy company. He speaks on issues of social justice and Australian identity to universities and companies. He has been outspoken in protecting the Adelaide Park Lands from tree removal and construction projects. In 2008 Flinders University recognised him as a distinguished alumnus for his contribution to Australian music and social justice. He is not affiliated with any political party.

In 2005 Schumann invited a number of musicians (including ex-Redgum members Hugh McDonald and Michael Atkinson) to play and sing on an album, Lawson, which comprises songs Schumann wrote based on poems by Australian poet Henry Lawson. Lawson was credited to John Schumann and the Vagabond Crew and released by ABC Music.

Schumann and Redgum were bought back to public attention in 2006 when Australian hip-hop group The Herd covered "I Was Only 19" with Schumann supplying some vocals. On 18 August 2006, John Schumann and the Vagabond Crew performed in Vũng Tàu, Vietnam, to mark the 40th anniversary of the Battle of Long Tân. The concert was broadcast nationally by ABC radio.

In 2007 John Schumann and The Vagabond Crew provided the music for a stage play, Lawson, starring Max Cullen as Henry Lawson. After refusing to appear live on the 1980s ABC music-TV show, Countdown, Schumann appeared in the Countdown Spectacular 2 concert series in Australia in August and September 2007. He sang the Redgum hit "I Was Only 19" only. From late 2007, John Schumann and the Vagabond Crew have appeared at major music festivals around Australia. Schumann signed a new multi-album deal with ABC Music and Behind the Lines, an album of songs related to Australians at war, was released in August 2008.

Schumann has performed for Australian forces overseas several times. In December 2009 he visited East Timor to play for Australian and New Zealand troops stationed there, in September–October 2011 he played for Australian troops in Afghanistan and in July 2013 he played for Australian troops and Australian Federal Police in the Solomon Islands.

In 2011 Schumann worked with the Defence department on "Dents in the Soul", a project designed to help soldiers deal with post traumatic stress disorder.

In 2015, Schumann recorded "Kokoda – Only The Brave Ones", a duet with Lee Kernaghan for his album Spirit of the Anzacs.

In 2015 he was commission by the Australian Army to write "Every Anzac Day", a song about aboriginal soldiers who served in the Australian military. It was released in April 2015 ahead of the 100th anniversary of the Gallipoli landings. It was released with "Anzac Biscuits" as a B-side.

== Personal life ==
Schumann met Denise 'Denny' Storen in 1981 and they later married. She is the sister of Vietnam veteran Mick Storen, whose recollections inspired "I Was Only 19". The couple have a son and a daughter.

== Discography ==
=== Studio albums ===
List of studio albums, with selected details and chart positions
Title	Album details	Peak chart positions
Title	Album details	AUS
Etched in Blue	Released: October 1987; Format: LP, CD, Cassette; Label: CBS (460271 2)	63
John Schumann Goes Looby-Loo: A Collection of Songs for Little Kids	Released: 1988; Format: LP, CD; Label: CBS (463255 2)	116
True Believers	Released: October 1993; Format: LP, CD; Label: CBS (473818 2)	—
Lawson (as John Schumann and the Vagabond Crew)	Released: 2005; Format: CD; Label: Bombora Creative (Bombora1)	—
Behind the Lines (as John Schumann and the Vagabond Crew)	Released: 2008; Format: CD, CD+DVD, download; Label: ABC Music, UMA (1778130)	—
Ghosts and Memories (as John Schumann and the Vagabond Crew)	Released: July 2018; Format: CD, download; Label: ABC Music (6765315)	—

=== Compilation albums ===
List of compilation albums, with selected details
Title	Details
Portrait: The Very Best of John Schumann	Released: 2002; Format: CD; Label: CBS (5109202000)
Gelignite Jack – The John Schumann Collection	Released: 2007; Format: CD, download; Label: ABC (5144227712)

=== Charting singles ===
List of singles, with selected chart positions
Title	Year	Peak chart positions	Album
Title	Year	AUS	Album
"Borrowed Ground"	1987	91	Etched in Blue
"Eyes on Fire"	1992	123	True Believers

== Awards and nominations ==
- Nominated for Best Children's Album in the 1989 ARIA Music Awards for John Schumann Goes Looby-Loo.
- APRA Song of the Year and Top Selling Song of the Year in the 1984 Country Music Awards of Australia (CMAA) (also known as the Golden Guitar Awards) for I Was Only 19 (written by John Schumann) performed by Redgum.
- Medal of the Order of Australia (OAM) in the 2014 Australia Day Honours for "service to music, and to the veteran community".
- Member of the Order of Australia (AM) in the 2022 Australia Day Honours for "significant service to the veteran community, to music, and to the community".
