= Barbara Morison =

Australian radio broadcaster

Barbara Morison is an Australian radio broadcaster based in Sydney Community Radio station 2SER FM. She specialises in Country Music, and has interviewed Willie Nelson, Kris Kristofferson, Johnny Cash, Waylon Jennings, Keith Urban, Troy Cassar-Daley and Lonnie Lee among many others.

== Work ==
The host of All Kinds of Country on since 1981, she was one of the inaugural broadcasters inducted into the Australian Country Music Broadcasters Hall Of Fame in 1997, awarded the Australian Bush Balladeer Association Achievement Award for services to Australian Country Music in 2013 and the Country Music Association of Australia award for Legacy Industry in 2024.

Morison began broadcasting as a school girl with her mother Irene Morison and later with her faithful dog Diesel, and has been a vital connection for audiences and industry to find each other and build the Australian country music scene locally. She has also championed the best of international country music for Australian audiences. She has also regularly reported on the Tamworth Country Music Festival.

== Irene Morison ==
Barbara's mother Irene Morison was also a champion of Australian Country music, privately fundraising in 1991 to have a bust of Buddy Williams produced for the Pioneer's Parader in Tamworth. The bust was the first of a collection that is now a drawcard for the Tamworth Country Music Festival, and has since been followed by busts for Tex Morton, Gordon Parsons, Stan Coster, Shirley Thoms, Reg Lindsay, Jimmy Little, Chad Morgan and others.
