= Shirley Thoms =

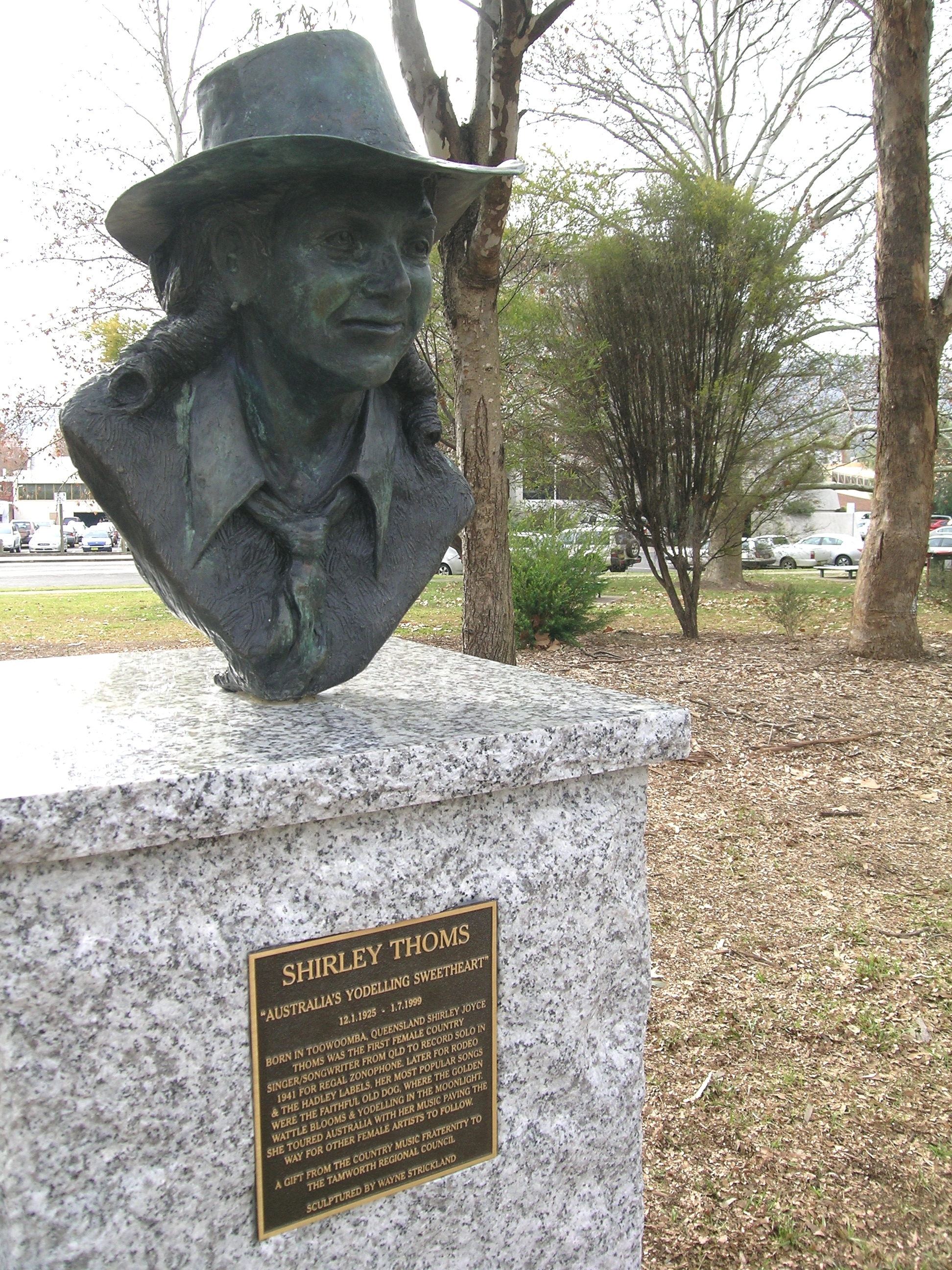
- A bronze statue bus tof Shirley Thoms in Bicennery Park, Tamworth, New South Wales

Background information
- Also known as: Australia's Yodelling Sweetheart
- Born: Shirley Joyce Thoms; 12 January 1925; Toowoomba, Queensland
- Died: 1 July 1999 (aged 74) Summerland Point, Lake Macquarie, New South Wales
- Genre: Country
- Occupations: Singer, songwriter

Shirley Thoms-Bystrynski (12 January 1925 – 1 July 1999), was an Australian country music singer and pioneer of Australia's country music industry. She was known as Australia's Yodelling Sweetheart.

== Biography ==
Thoms was born in January 1925, in Toowoomba, Queensland and was raised in a family of seven children.

She began her career singing and yodelling songs by Tex Morton and Harry Torrani, and won a Bundaberg talent quest with Torrani's Mockingbird Yodel. In 1941, aged 16, with what is now EMI Records she became the first female solo act to record country music in Australia, as well as the first Queenslander to be featured on disc. This first batch of songs included ""Faithful Old Dog". She went on to tour Australia and New Zealand, entertaining the troops during World War II and writing songs. Thoms became known by the title of Australia's Yodelling Sweetheart. She later toured with Sole Bros Circus and met her first husband John Sole. The couple had a son, Peter and Thoms stepped away from show business, however John Sole died prematurely. In 1970, Thoms came out of retirement to appear on the Captain Cook Bicentenary Show in the Tamworth Town Hall and briefly revived her career with album releases in 1970 and 1972.

Her most popular and best selling recordings were "The Faithful Old Dog", "Where The Golden Wattle Blooms" and "Yodelling in the Moonlight".

After suffering from Parkinson's disease and a heart condition, she died in 1999, at Summerland Point, Lake Macquarie, NSW, aged 74.

== Legacy ==
There is a collection of bronze busts in Bicentennial Park, Tamworth that includes Shirley Thoms, Stan Coster, Tex Morton, Gordon Parsons, Barry Thornton and Buddy Williams.

== Honours and awards ==
=== Australian Roll of Renown ===
The Australian Roll of Renown honours Australian and New Zealander musicians who have shaped the music industry by making a significant and lasting contribution to Country Music. It was inaugurated in 1976 and the inductee is announced at the Country Music Awards of Australia in Tamworth in January. Thoms was the fifth artist and first woman to receive this honour.

Year	Nominee / work	Award	Result
1980	Shirley Thoms	Australian Roll of Renown	inductee
