= Ashleigh Dallas =

- Born: 1994
- Genre: Country
- Occupations: Singer, songwriter
- Instruments: Vocals; guitar
- Years active: 2013–present
- Label: Checked Label
- Website: ashleighdallas.com.au

Ashleigh Dallas is an Australian country music singer-songwriter and multi-instrumentalist.

== Life and career ==
=== Early life ===
Ashleigh Dallas was born in Tamworth, NSW. Her father, Brett Dallas is a Golden Guitar winner and producer and her grandfather, Rex Dallas is an Australian Roll of Renown recipient and Golden Guitar winner. Dallas recalls performing from the age of five in her grandfather's barn. She wrote her first song when she was 12 years old.

=== 2013–present: Career beginnings ===
Dallas released her debut album, Dancing with a Ghost in September 2013. In 2014, Dallas won the Qantaslink New Talent of the Year at the Country Music Awards of Australia.

Dallas released her second studio album, Other Side of Town in August 2015.

In 2022, Dallas, won Female Artist of the Year and Video of the Year for "Long Way 'Round" at the Country Music Awards of Australia.

Dallas' Setting Suns was nominated for Traditional Country Album of the Year and Album of the Year at the 2025 Country Music Awards of Australia.

== Personal life ==
In 2019, Ashleigh gave birth to Harriet Lynn Dallas.

== Discography ==
=== Albums ===
List of albums, with selected details and chart positions
Title	Details	Peak chart positions	
Title	Details	AUS	AUS Country
Dancing with a Ghost	Released: September 2013; Label: Essence Music (5310589562); Formats: CD, digital download	—	—
Other Side of Town	Released: 14 August 2015; Label: WJO, Universal Music Australia (4746960); Formats: CD, digital download	—	—
Lighthouse	Released: 6 January 2017; Label: Ashleigh Dallas, Checked Label (3300270); Formats: CD, digital download	—	—
Reflection	Released: 12 July 2019; Label: Ashleigh Dallas, Checked Label; Formats: CD, digital download	—	5
In the Moment	Released: 9 September 2022; Label: Ashleigh Dallas, Checked Label; Formats: CD, digital download	63	8
Setting Suns	Released: 13 September 2024; Label: Ashleigh Dallas, Checked Label; Formats: CD, digital download	—	13

== Awards and nominations ==
=== Country Music Awards of Australia ===
The Country Music Awards of Australia (CMAA) (also known as the Golden Guitar Awards) is an annual awards night held in January during the Tamworth Country Music Festival, celebrating recording excellence in the Australian country music industry. They have been held annually since 1973.

Awards and nominations for Ashleigh Dallas
Year	Nominee / work	Award	Result (wins only)
2014	Ashleigh Dallas	New Talent of the Year	Won
2018	Lighthouse	Traditional Country Album of the Year	Won
2022	Ashleigh Dallas	Female Vocalist of the Year	Won
2022	"Long Way 'Round"	Video of the Year	Won
2023	In the Moment	Traditional Country Album of the Year	Won
2025	Setting Suns	Traditional Country Album of the Year	Won
