= Lenore Somerset =

Australian folk singer (1931–2006)

- Born: 17 February 1931; Brisbane, Queensland, Australia
- Died: 17 October 2006 (aged 75) Melbourne, Victoria, Australia
- Genres: Folk music, popular music
- Occupations: Musician, actress
- Instruments: Voice, guitar
- Years active: 1940s - 19??, 1960s - 2000s
- Labels: Regal Zonephone, W&G, CBS, EMS, Astor

Lenore Somerset (1931–2006) was an Australian folk singer who was popular in the 1960s. She recorded for various labels which included W&G Records, EMS Records and CBS Records. She was also an actress, appeared in Australian television series' Young Ramsay, Division 4, Homicide and Bluey, etc.

== Background ==
Lenore Somerset was born in Brisbane, Queensland in 1931. She moved to Melbourne in the late 1950s. She was discovered by her neighbor who heard her singing over the fence. With his help, it led to television appearances and performing around town.

She was the niece of Australian country singer Buddy Williams. In her early days she was known as Lenore Miller. She recorded five duets with her uncle which were released on the Regal Zonophone label. With the Regal Zonophone recordings behind her, it was in the 1960s she found success when known as Lenore Somerset.

According to a 1963 issue of Billboard, Lenore Somerset was likely the best-known folk singer in Australia. She rode the crest of the folk popularity wave in the early 1960s.

Some of the venues she appeared in locally include the Melbourne Jazz and Folk Center in 1963, the Sydney Conservatorium in 1964, and the Chevron Hotel in 1972 etc.

== Career ==
=== 1960s ===
==== Debut album ====
By June 1963, Lenore Somerset's debut album had been released. She was pictured on page 18 of the 20 June 1963 issue of The Age. By that time, she had already appeared on all three of the television stations in Melbourne. Her album was reviewed by "Orpheus" on page four of the edition. It was speculated by Billboard that the album should secure a personal management contract with Woomera Music. The album, Lenora Somerset Sings featured fourteen songs which included "All My Trials", "Moreton Bay", "Andy's Gone with the Cattle", "The Ox Driver Song", "The Riddle Song", and Little Moses".

==== Australian Newport folk festival ====
Somerset along with Marian Henderson, Gary Shearston, Tina Lawton, Martin Wyndham-Reade, Jeanne Lewis, and compere Leonard Teale were scheduled to appear at the Australian Newport Folk Festival which was held at the Newport Oval in Newport, New South Wales from 8–10 January 1965. According to The Canberra Times, the festival was expected to bring in up to 12,000 people over its three-day run.

The event was recorded, and according to the 4 March issue of The Canberra Times, there were six programmes. The first of them was to be broadcast by the A.B.C on 7 march. Paul Marks, a jazz / blues singer & guitarist was the featured artist. The second and third programmes would be of Tina Lawton and Lenore Somerset respectively.

==== Further activities ====
Along with Judy Jacques, Hans Georg, Brian Mooney, Martin Wyneham Read, Kirk & Jane, Juan da Montagne (Spanish Guitarist), Somerset was scheduled to appear at the Melbourne Folk Festival on 9 April 1965.

It was written in the 14 May 1965 issue of The Australian Jewish News that Mike Seeger, brother of Pete and his band, the New Lost City Ramblers would be playing two concerts at the Melbourne Town Hall on Wednesday 26 May and Tuesday 1 June. The stars of the Australian Newport Folk Festival, Marian Henderson, Gary Shearston, Paul Marks, Tina Lawton, Lenore Somerset, The Wesley Three, And Sean and Sonja etc. would be on the same programme.

Somerset was pictured with folk singers Doug Owen and Margaret Smith in the 22 July 1965 issue of The Age. They were to appear in a variety show, televised on GTV-9 on the 29th. A song they were expected to perform was "Follow the Drinking Gourd which was described by the paper as an American Negro freedom song, which references a constellation pointing the way to freedom. Also scheduled to be at the event were Chris Beard and his sister Robina, Toni Lamond, Bon Maguire, Judd Laine, Roger McDougall, and Mary Hardy.

It was reported by Billboard in the magazine's 13 November 1965 issue that Somerset had released her self-titled EP and was in the process of recording her third album release.

In a December 1966 article Garry Raffaele of The Canberra Times, she was described as lengthening and broadening her musical scope, so unlike some other folk singers, she was able to make a full-time living from her music. While her musical recordings were in the folk genre, her television appearances and cabaret work were more commercial.

According to the 16 July 1966 issue of Billboard, popular W&G Records artist Lenore Somerset was doing well with her low-priced album. It was described by Cash Box as an interesting set of early Australian tunes drawn from old miner and sheep drover songs.

With Normie Rowe, Maureen Elkner, Phil Lanham, Pauline Murphy and Danny O'Meara the compere, Somerset appeared on stage at Nui Dat, South Vietnam on a government sponsored show to entertain Australian troops. The event was held on 25 April 1969. She was also photographed that month at Nui Dat by David Reginald Combe, giving a letter from home to Private David Jones of the 3rd Squadron, Special Air Service Regiment.

According to the "On-the-scene" section in the 21 May 1969 issue of The Altona Star, Somerset had changed her singing style from the days when she was at Frank Traynor's club.

=== 1970s - 1980s ===
Along with Graeme Thompson, Peter Carr, Peter Robinson, John Farrar, Pat Carroll, Doug Owen and Terry Walker, Somerset was part of a concert party that went to Saigon in 1970.

It was reported by Cash Box in the 27 November 1971 issue that W&G Records had re-entered the singles race with Lenore Somerset's "Listen to the Man" record that was composed by David Langdon, a local writer.

On 13 April 1974 Somerset and Barry Krause were booked to appear at the Hakoah Eastern Suburbs football club with Somerset in the first show slot.

Somerset recorded an album Misty that was released on the EMS label (GNLP 7056) in 1978, which was run by Graham Morphett, the same label that Veronica Overton, Patsy Biscoe, Mike Quarmby and Pam Tamblyn had releases on.

=== 1980s - 2000s ===
According to the 17 May 1980 issue of TV Week, 'Reg Lindsay was looking forward to recording more of his Reg Lindsay's Country Homestead show at QTQ9 in Brisbane. His guests were said to be Lenore Somerset, Maria Dallas, Derwood Magill and Jan Kelly.

Somerset was still performing in the 2000s while aged in her seventies.

In the 2000s, prior to her death, Somerset was honored at the Tamworth Country Music Festival.

== Death ==
Lenore Somerset died in Melbourne, Victoria on 17 October 2006.

== Later years ==
According to the 20 April 2009 issue of The Phoenix, recording engineer Marcus Herman had been working on a live set of performances from thirty years prior. The CD album, Wandong Country Live included Lenore Somerset, Kevin Shegog, David Pincombe, The Hawking Brothers and Tex Morton.

== Discography ==
Singles
Act	Release	Catalogue	Year	Notes
The Yodeling Jackaroo & Lenore Miller	"Brown-Eyed Sweetheart of Mine" / "The Bushman's Rodeo"	Regal Zonophone G24929	1945	shellac, 10", 78 RPM
Buddy Williams & Lenore Miller	"Where the Lazy Murray River Rolls Along" / "The Drover's Song"	Regal Zonophone G24947	1945	shellac, 10", 78 RPM
Buddy Williams and Lenore Miller	"Rhythm in the Saddle" / "Bushland Paradise"	Regal Zonophone G24963	?	shellac, 10", 78 RPM
Lenore Somerset	"Mary's Boy Child" / "Little Moses"	W&G S 1798	1964	7" 45 rpm
Lenore Somerset	"Massachusetts" / "What Now My Love"	CBS BA 221475	1968	7" 45 rpm
Lenore Somerset	"Listen to the Man" / "You've Gotta Learn to Stand Together"	W&G S 8282	1970	7" 45 rpm

EP
Act	Release	Tracks	Catalogue	Year	Notes
Lenore Somerset	Requests	"Hava Nagila", "Moreton Bay" "Foggy Foggy Dew", "Little Moses"	W&G WG-E-2415	1965	
Lenore Somerset	Lenore Somerset Live	"Jericho", "Oh Freedom", " Come, Go With Me to That Land" "Hava Nagila", "he Ox Drivers"	W&G WG-E-2485	1965	

Albums
Act	Release	Catalogue	Year	Notes
Lenore Somerset	Lenore Somerset Sings	W&G B 1578	1963	
Lenore Somerset	Portrait of a Folk Singer	W&G B 1911	1964	
Lenore Somerset	Australia Past	W&G 25/2521	1965	
Lenore Somerset	Misty	EMS Records (Nationwide) GNLP 7056	1977 / 1978	
Lenore Somerset	For Billy Joe	W&G / Astor	1980	

== Television and film ==
Television
Title	Episode	Role	Director	Date	Notes
Homicide	"The Visitors"	Nola Pickett	Athol Charlwood, Andrew Swanson	Oct 17, 1967	
Division 4	"Collision"	Liz Richards	John Jacob, David Pulbrook	Nov 17, 1971	
Homicide	"Matchmaker"	Cheryl Green	Paul Eddey	Aug 28, 1973	
Matlock Police	"No Problems"	Jessica martin	Graeme Arthur	Jan 15, 1976	
Homicide	"Bunny"	Stella Fisher	George Miller	Apr 19, 1976	
Bluey	"Father and Son"	Mavis	Gary Conway	Feb 19, 1977	
Young Ramsay	"Story of a Shaggy Dog"	Elaine Phillips	David Stevens	Nov 4, 1977	
Carson's Law	"Trial and Error"	Ruby	Mandy Smith	Mar 29, 1983	

Film
Title	Role	Director	Date	Notes
Me & Mr Thorne	Lila	Paul Eddey	1976	Australian television movie
