= Quarmby (surname) =

Quarmby is a surname. Notable people with the surname include:

- John Quarmby (1929–2019), English actor
- Jonathan Quarmby (born 1961), English record producer and songwriter
- Lynne Quarmby, Canadian scientist, activist and politician
- Mike Quarmby, Australian country singer and horticulturalist
