= Tim McNamara =

Tim McNamara may refer to:

- Tim McNamara (baseball), pitcher in Major League Baseball
- Tim McNamara (musician), Australian country music performer, radio presenter and talent scout
- Timothy P. McNamara, psychologist at Vanderbilt University
