= Bush ballad =

Music genre of Australia

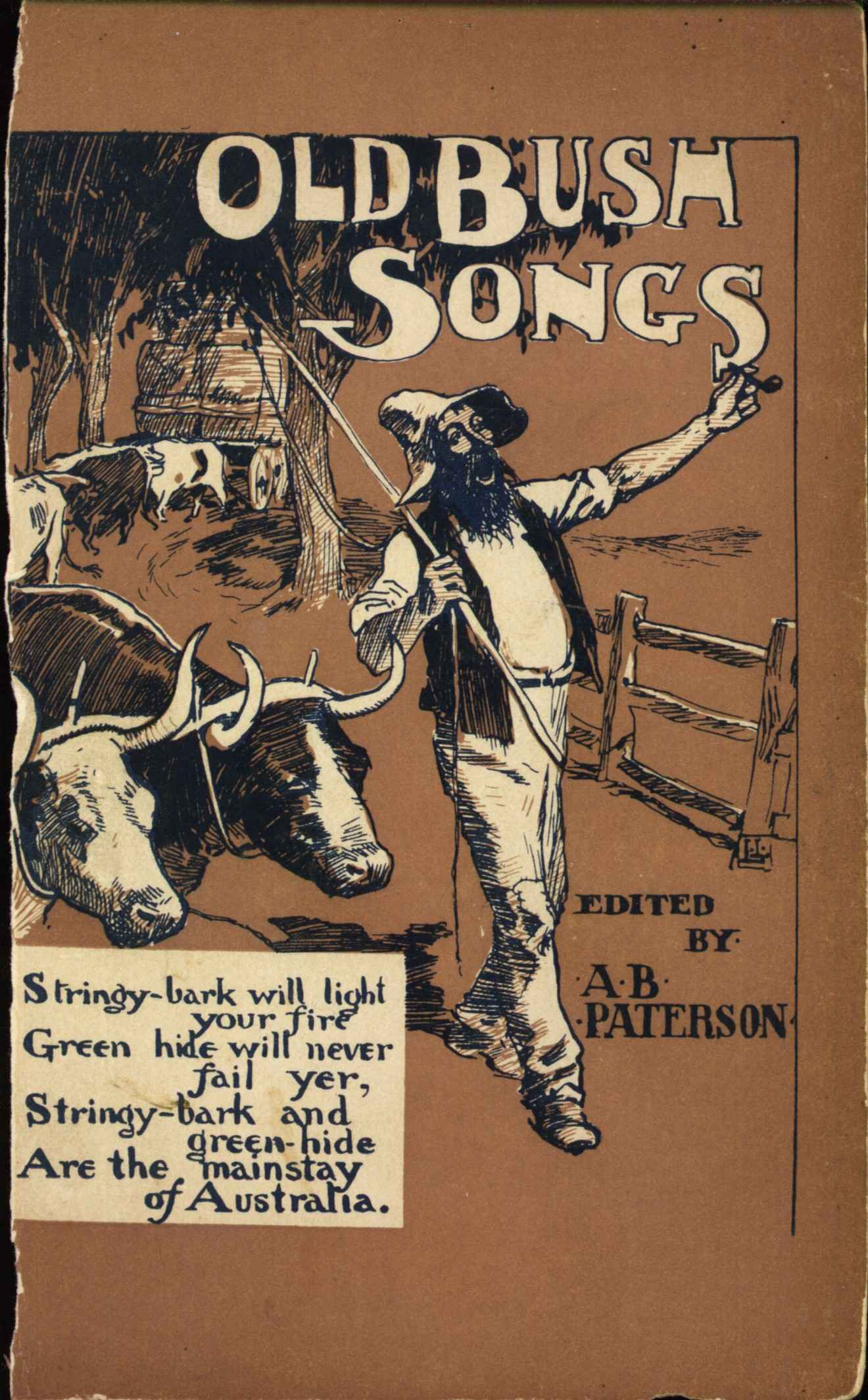
Cover of Old Bush Songs (1905), Banjo Paterson's seminal collection of bush ballads.

The bush ballad, bush song, or bush poem is a style of poetry and folk music that depicts the life, character and scenery of the Australian bush. The typical bush ballad employs a straightforward rhyme structure to narrate a story, often one of action and adventure, and uses language that is colourful, colloquial, and idiomatically Australian. Bush ballads range in tone from humorous to melancholic, and many explore themes of Australian folklore, including bushranging, droving, droughts, floods, life on the frontier, the city-country divide, and relations between Indigenous and European Australians.

The tradition dates back to the beginnings of European settlement when colonists, mostly British and Irish, brought with them the folk music of their homelands. Many early bush poems originated in Australia's convict system, and were transmitted orally rather than in print. It evolved into a unique style over the ensuing decades, attaining widespread popularity in the late 19th and early 20th centuries when it was thought by many Australians to convey "an authentic expression of the national spirit". Through bush poetry, publications like The Bulletin sought to define and promote mateship, egalitarianism, anti-authoritarianism and a concern for the "battler" as quintessential Australian values.

Though the style has since declined in popularity, works from the period leading up to Federation remain among the best-known and loved poems in Australia, and "bush bards" such as Henry Lawson and Banjo Paterson are regarded as giants of Australian literature. Clubs and festivals devoted to bush poetry can be found throughout the country, and the tradition lives on in Australian country music.

== Characteristics ==
The songs tell personal stories of life in the wide open country of Australia. Typical subjects include mining, raising and droving cattle, sheep shearing, wanderings, war stories, the 1891 Australian shearers' strike, class conflicts between the landless working class and the squatters (landowners), and bushrangers such as Ned Kelly, as well as love interests and more modern fare such as trucking.

Although not technically bush ballads, there are also numerous sea shanties formerly sung by whalers and other sailors, as well as songs about the voyage made by convicts and other immigrants from England to Australia, which are sung in a similar style.

While subject matter may be constant, musical styles differ between traditional and contemporary bush ballads. Exemplars of the traditional bush ballad style include Slim Dusty's When the Rain Tumbles Down in July or Leave Him in the Long yard which have strong narrative in verses plus choruses set to a Pick n' Strum beat. Contemporary bush ballads may employ finger picking and strumming rock styles.

== History ==
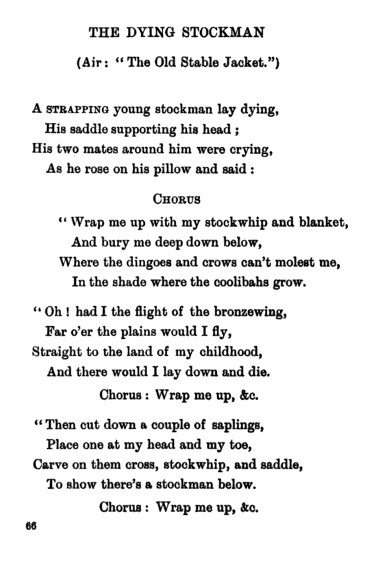
First page of "The Dying Stockman," a bush ballad published in Banjo Paterson's 1905 collection The Old Bush Songs

Australia's musical traditions include the English, Scottish, and Irish folk songs of the convicts, as well as the work of pastoral poets of the 1880s. There was also a hymn singing tradition brought by missionaries in the 19th century. and the convict songs of those incarcerated on the island. They represent attempts to European cultural forms to the Australian environment.

The distinctive themes and origins of Australia's bush music can be traced to the songs sung by the convicts who were sent to Australia during the early period of the British colonisation, beginning in 1788. Early Australian ballads sing of the harsh ways of life of the epoch and of such people and events as bushrangers, swagmen, drovers, stockmen and shearers. Convict and bushranger verses often railed against government tyranny. Classic bush songs on such themes include: The Wild Colonial Boy, Click Go The Shears, The Eumeralla Shore, The Drover's Dream, The Queensland Drover, The Dying Stockman and Moreton Bay.

Later themes which endure to the present include the experiences of war, of droughts and flooding rains, of Aboriginality and of the railways and trucking routes which link Australia's vast distances. Isolation and loneliness of life in the Australian bush has been another theme. For much of its history, Australia's bush music belonged to an oral and folkloric tradition, and was only later published in print in volumes such as Banjo Paterson's Old Bush Songs, in the 1890s.

The songs often discuss the hardscrabble life and struggles of the Aussie battler. The songs are often ironic and humorous as with Paterson's Beautiful Land of Australia chorus: "Illawarra, Mittagong, Parramatta, Wollongong. If you wish to become an ourang-outang, Then go to the bush of Australia."

The lyrics for "Waltzing Matilda", often regarded as Australia's unofficial national anthem, were also composed by Paterson in 1895. This strain of Australian country music, with lyrics focusing on strictly Australian subjects, is generally known as "bush music" or "bush band music".

The ballad genre continued in Australia after popular music took hold in Great Britain. "The oral ballad tradition centered on rural areas had been dying out in England for a generation as a consequence of the land clearances, industrialisation and urbanisation, found a new lease of life in the Australian bush, and one suspects that these traditional and reworked ballads were also sung in the early "free and easys." While popular music in England had begun to develop in the working-class music halls during the 1830s and 1840s, the spread of popular music in Australia was still in its infancy."

The diversity in Australia has increased, but even in the 1920s Poncie Cubillo introduced the rondalla with their Filipino string band in Darwin.

The ballad tradition has grown to include some of these influences including Chinese and Filipino. There were also the de Bortoli family, in Texas, Queensland, Italians who grew tobacco, adding to the amalgam of folk tunes and Tex Morton hillbilly tunes. Morton, a country music singer originally from New Zealand, released a number of Australian-themed 78s between 1936 and 1943 (including "Dying Duffer's Prayer," "Murrumbridgee Jack," "Billy Brink The Shearer," "Stockman's Last Bed," "Wrap Me Up in My Stockwhip and Blanket," "Rocky Ned (The Outlaw)," and "Ned Kelly Song"), which can be considered to have been inspired by the bush ballad tradition. However, Morton sang without an Australian accent and his yodeling style was closer to that of the American singer Jimmie Rodgers than earlier Australian folk singers.

Later influences from American cowboy and country songs and 1950s rock 'n' roll led to the performance of bush ballads being influenced by and combined with these forms. With the advance of technology and mass communications, the bush ballads were joined on the modern Australian music scene by rockabilly, country music, blues, Texas swing, bluegrass, trail songs, and country pop.

Country and folk artists including Slim Dusty, Stan Coster, Rolf Harris, The Bushwackers, John Williamson, Graeme Connors and John Schumann of the band Redgum have continued to record and popularise the old bush ballads of Australia through the 20th and into the 21st century, and contemporary artists including Sara Storer and Lee Kernaghan draw heavily on this heritage.

Ashley Cook, a contemporary balladeer, sings about topics relevant to life in agriculture and mining work in Australia's outback: Cattle, Dust and Leather and Blue Queensland Dogs. His song "Road to Kakadu" laments the slaughter of water buffalo in Northern Territory in the 1990s to control the Brucellosis disease. Beneath the Queensland Moon covers the life and death as a drover.

== Public perceptions ==
The genre is sometimes represented as unsophisticated, partially due to clichéd images and stereotypes.

The genre has been influential and inspirational in theater and movies. Since the mid-20th century, bush songs have often been performed by bush bands, such as The Bandicoots or Franklyn B Paverty. Female bush balladeers have also been studied.

A number of awards have been set up to recognize bush balladeers. Jeff Brown was nominated for a Golden Guitar Award in the Bush Ballad of the Year category for a song he recorded In the wings of the yard in 2008. Past winners of the Country Music Awards Australia Bush Ballad of the Year include Anne Kirkpatrick and Joy McKean. The Stan Coster Memorial Bush Ballad Award is presented in several categories. 2007 winners included Reg Poole for male vocalist of the year for 'A Tribute To Slim', Graham Rodger for Songwriter of the Year 'The Battle of Long Tan', and Dean Perrett for Album of the Year 'New Tradition'. The publishers of the Balladeers Bulletin magazine also hold a "Bush Balladeer Starquest" competition. At the 2008 36th Country Music Awards of Australia held in Tamworth, Amos Morris became the youngest artist ever to win the Golden Guitar trophy for the Bush Ballad of the Year category with Sign of the Times.

== Examples ==
Some examples of popular bush ballad poems and songs include:

Traditional:

- "The Wild Colonial Boy"
- "Click Go the Shears"
- "Moreton Bay"

The Bush Bards:

- "Fair girls and grey horses", by Will H. Ogilvie
- "Freedom on the Wallaby" by Henry Lawson
- "The Sick Stockrider" by Adam Lindsay Gordon
- "Waltzing Matilda" by Banjo Paterson

Modern writers and singers:

- When the Rain Tumbles Down in July by Slim Dusty
- Leave Him in the Longyard by Kelly Dixon (versions by Slim Dusty and Lee Kernaghan)
- Three Rivers Hotel by Stan Coster (versions by Slim Dusty and John Williamson)
- The Ballad of Camooweal sung by Slim Dusty
- The Biggest Disappointment by Joy McKean (sung by Slim Dusty and Troy Cassar-Daley)
- Mallee Boy by John Williamson
- Diamantina Drover by Hugh McDonald (of Redgum)

== Bush balladeers ==
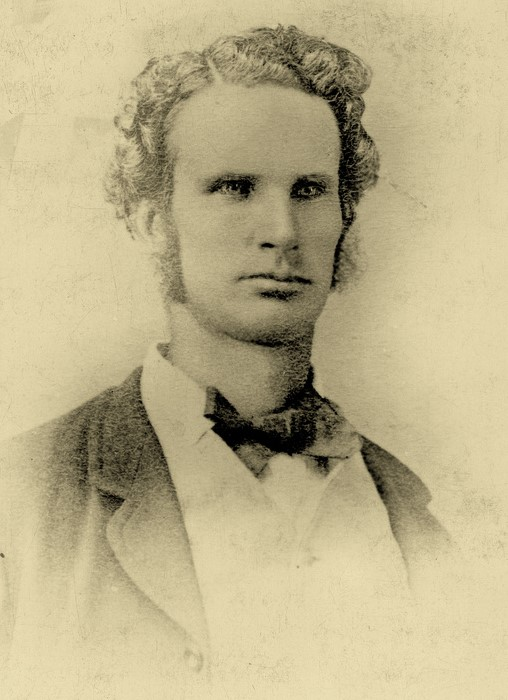
Adam Gordon

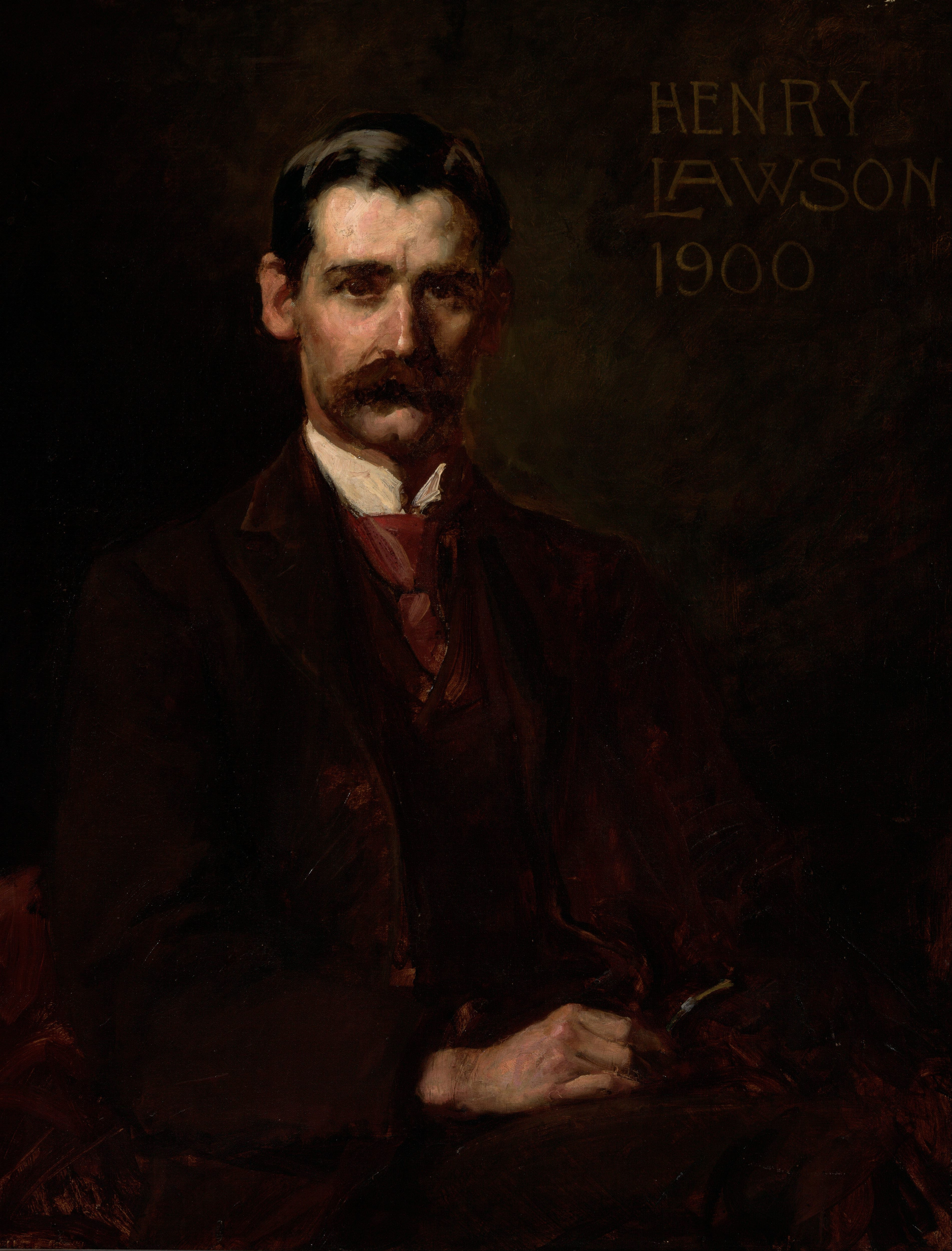
Henry Lawson

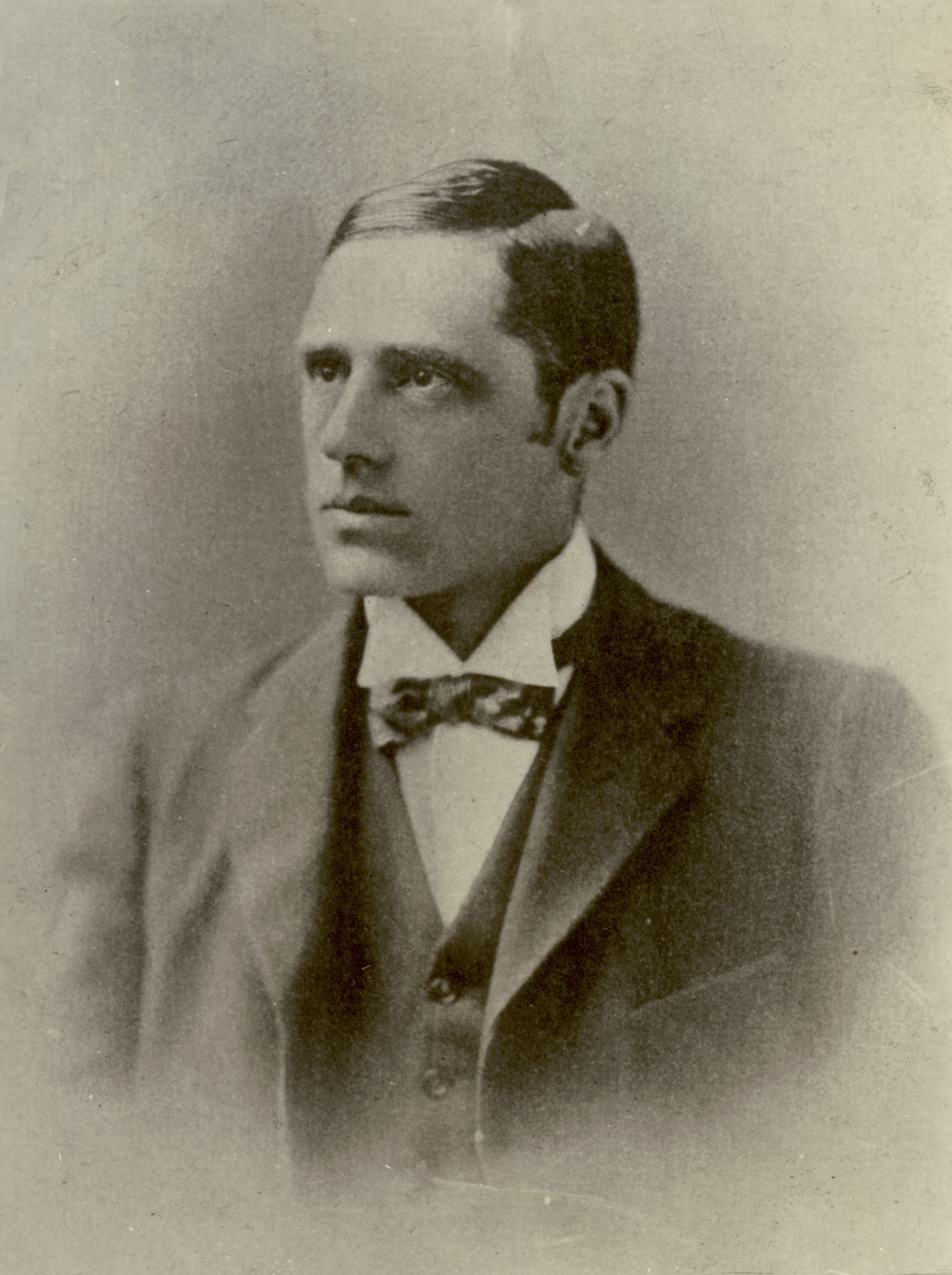
Banjo Paterson

- Lex Banning (1921–1965)
- Barbara Baynton (1857–1929)
- Barcroft Boake (1866–1892)
- David Campbell (1915–1979)
- Stan Coster (1930–1997)
- C. J. Dennis (1876–1938)
- Slim Dusty (1927–2003)
- Edward Dyson (1865–1931)
- Warren Fahey (b. 1946)
- John Farrell (1851–1904)
- Adam Lindsay Gordon (1833–1870)
- Edward Harrington (1896–1966)
- Clive James (1939–2019)
- Henry Kendall (1839–1882)
- Henry Lawson (1867–1922)
- Will Lawson (1876–1957)
- Geoffrey Lehmann (b. 1940)
- Lionel Long (1939–1998)
- James McAuley (1917–1976)
- Dorothea Mackellar (1885–1968)
- Francis 'Frank the Poet' MacNamara (1810–1862)
- Harry 'Breaker' Morant (1864–1902)
- John Shaw Neilson (1872–1942)
- Will H. Ogilvie (1869–1963)
- Jack O'Hagan (1898–1987)
- Gordon Parsons (1926–1990)
- Banjo Paterson (1864–1941)
- Dean Perrett
- Gary Shearston (1939–2013)
- Kenneth Slessor (1901–1971)
- Charles Robert Thatcher (1830–1878)
- Shirley Thoms (1925–1999)
- Francis Webb (1925–1973)
- Buddy Williams (1918–1986)
- John Williamson (b. 1945)

=== Collectors of bush songs ===
- Warren Fahey
- John Manifold (balladeer and collector)
- John Meredith
- Les Murray
- Banjo Paterson
- Bill Scott (balladeer and collector)

=== In other languages ===
- Iain Eairdsidh MacAsgaill (1898–1934)

== See also ==
- Australian literature
