= Buddy Williams =

Buddy Williams may refer to:

- Buddy Williams (jazz drummer) (born 1952), American jazz drummer
- Buddy Williams (country musician) (1918–1986), Australian country musician, singer and songwriter
