= Jewel Coburn =

Australian music publisher, singer, and former actress

- Born: Jewel Evelyn Blanch; 4 March 1958 (age 67); Glen Innes, New South Wales, Australia
- Occupations: Music publisher; singer; actress
- Years active: 1962–present

Jewel Evelyn Coburn (née Blanch; born 4 March 1958) is an Australian music publisher, singer and former actress.

== Biography ==
Jewel Coburn was born as Jewel Evelyn Blanch on 4 March 1958 in Glen Innes, New South Wales, to Berice Ida (née Collins) and Arthur Ernest Blanch. Both parents were established country music performers. The family were living on a farm, "Harmony Hill", 16 kilometres (10 mi) from Brisbane. Blanch appeared on Brisbane's Coca-Cola TV Show, singing and playing a ukulele, aged 3. She recorded a novelty song "I Wanna Stay on Jumbo" in 1962 at the age of four, which was issued in March 1963. During her childhood, Blanch and her parents toured as the Blanch Family or the Blanches.

She appeared on television programs in Australia and the United States, The Linkletter Show, The Barry Crocker Show and Junior Bandstand. At the age of 8, Blanch had a recording contract with EMI Records for four songs on its imprint, His Master's Voice.

In 1962 The Blanch Family were signed to W&G label in Melbourne where they recorded a song written for Jewel "I Wanta Stay on Jumbo" and a duet with her father "On Accounts I Love You". "Jumbo" was an instant success and became a national hit.

The family embarked on a fifteen-month tour of the United States from December 1963, during which time Blanch attended a Beverly Hills Unified School District. They returned to Australia in 1965, but relocated to the US in 1968 where Blanch was signed to Capitol Records and worked with Al De Lory.

During the 1970s, Blanch became better known for her acting, working on American television programs, The Mod Squad, Bonanza, Lassie, Night Gallery, Owen Marshall, Counselor at Law and Jigsaw John. For secondary education she attended University High School, West Los Angeles and then Hollywood Professional School. The actress appeared in the films, Baffled! (1973), The Morning After (1974), and Against a Crooked Sky (1975). Blanch received critical praise for playing a visually impaired girl on the ABC Afterschool Special, Blind Sunday in 1976. She had a guest role as Abbie Singleton for six episodes of Australian soap The Young Doctors in 1977.

Blanch's singing career developed in the late 1970s and she was recognised as an emerging talent by publications such as Record World and Cashbox. She won Billboard's Country Music Award for Number One New Female Singles Artist in 1979.

Blanch's handprints were imprinted into the new Australian Country Music Hands of Fame monument in Tamworth, New South Wales in recognition of the success she had already achieved during her career.

Blanch went on to have further success as a country music performer, winning three Golden Guitars at the Country Music Awards of Australia. In 1982, she was awarded Golden Guitars for Female Vocalist of the Year and for Album of the Year, for "The Lady and the Cowboy" which she had recorded with her father. The following year, Blanch was again awarded the Golden Guitar for Female Vocalist of the Year.

Upon marrying Barry Coburn in 1982, she returned to the United States in 1984 where the couple opened a music publishing company called Ten Ten Music Group. In 2012, Coburn co-founded the Eleven Eleven Music Group with Jason Morris. Coburn sold her share of the Ten Ten Music Group in 2014.

== Work ==
=== Film ===
Year	Title	Role	Type
1975	Against a Crooked Sky	Herself/Performer: Title song "Against a Crooked Sky"	Feature film, US

=== Television ===
Year	Title	Role	Type
1961	Coca-Cola TV Show	Regular - Herself/Performer	TV series Australia
1970	The Mod Squad	Guest role: Luanne McKenna	TV series US, 1 episode
1970; 1971	Lassie	Guest roles: Little Girl/Young Girl	TV series, 1 episode
1970	Lassie: Well of Love	Little Girl	TV film, US
1971	Lassie	Guest role: Jodi Tyler	TV series US, 2 episodes
1971	Night Gallery	Guest role: Monica (Segment "The Doll")	TV series US, 1 episode
1971	Bonanza	Guest roles: Neta Thatcher/Carrie Sturgis	TV series US, 2 episodes
1972	Owen Marshall, Counselor at Law	Guest role: Judy	TV series US, 1 episode
1972	Baffled!	Jennifer Glenn	TV film, US
1972	Climb an Angry Mountain	Christina Cooper	TV film, US
1974	The Morning After	Karen Lester	TV film, US
1975	The Honorable Sam Houston	Nancy Houston	TV film, US
1976	Jigsaw John	Guest role: Deedee	TV series US, 1 episode
1976	ABC After School Specials	Guest role: Eileen	TV series US, 1 episode
1976	Isis	Guest role: Hope	TV series, 1 episode
1976-1977	The Young Doctors	Recurring Guest role: Abbie Singleton	TV series Australia, 6 episodes
1977; 1978; 1982	The Mike Walsh Show	Guest - Herself	TV series Australia, 1 episode
1977	Maggi Eckhardt Show	Guest - Herself	TV series Australia, 1 episode
1978	Fantasy Island	Guest role: Charity	TV series US, 1 episode
1978	Project U.F.O.	Guest role: Sis	TV series US, 1 episode
1978	Reg Lindsay's Country Homestead	Guest - Herself/Performer	TV series Australia, 1 episode
1978, 1982	The Mike Walsh Show	Guest - Herself/Performer	TV series Australia, 1 episode
1979	Blind Sunday	Role unknown	TV film
1980	John Singleton	Guest - Herself	TV series Australia, 1 episode
1982	Country Music Awards of Australia	Herself - Winner	TV special, Australia
1982	The Mike Walsh Show	Guest - Herself/Performer	TV series Australia, 1 episode

== Discography ==
=== Albums ===
Title	Album details
Meet the Blanch Family (as part of The Blanch Family)	Released: 1960s; Format: LP; Label: W&G (WG-B-1705)
The Lady and the Cowboy (with Arthur Blanch)	Released: 1981; Format: LP, Cassette; Label: CBS (SBP 237632)
Send All the Ghosts Away	Released: 1982; Format: LP, cassette; Label: CBS (SBP 237842)
Blanch Family Classics (as part of The Blanch Family)	Released: November 1983; Format: LP, Cassette; Label: Axis (AX.1183); Compilation album
The Best of Jewel Blanch	Released: 2015; Format: CD; Compilation album

=== Singles ===
Year	Title
1962	"I Wanta Stay on Jumbo"
1963	"On Accounts I Love You" (with Arthur Blanch)
1964	"Christmas Kangaroo" (with The Kanga-Rolers)
1967	"The Funny Little Voice "
1967	"Mummy's Pretty Clothes" / "Gary"
1976	"Will I Ever Learn"
1978	"Keep Me from Blowing Away"
1979	"Can I See You Tonight"
1981	"You Bring the Best Out in Me"/"I Can Love You" (with Arthur Blanch)
1982	"There's More to Country Than Cowboys" (with Arthur Blanch)

== Awards ==
=== Country Music Awards of Australia ===
The Country Music Awards of Australia (CMAA) (also known as the Golden Guitar Awards) is an annual awards night held in January during the Tamworth Country Music Festival, celebrating recording excellence in the Australian country music industry. They have been held annually since 1973.

Year	Nominee / work	Award	Result
1982	"I Can Love You"	Female Vocalist of the Year	Won
1982	The Lady and the Cowboy (with Arthur Blanch)	Album of the Year	Won
1983	Send All the Ghosts Away	Female Vocalist of the Year	Won

- Note: wins only
