= Dean Perrett =

Australian singer–songwriter

- Origin: Kingaroy, Queensland, Australia
- Genres: Traditional Country and Bush Ballad
- Instruments: Guitar, Singer
- Years active: 1989 – present
- Website: www.deanperrett.com

Dean Perrett is an Australian Traditional Country singer and songwriter from Queensland, Australia.

Dean is one of Australia's leading Traditional Country and Bush Ballad artists, He recorded his first album in 1989 and in the following 25 years he has released 12 more albums.

Dean has toured internationally and regularly performs at the Tamworth Country Music Festival and other various festivals and gigs.

== Albums ==
Title	Details
Australia She's Mine	Released: 1989
Kings in Grass Castles	Released: 1999; Label: LBS Records (LBS039CD)
The Real Thing	Released: 2001; Label: LBS Records (LBS058CD)
All Set & Saddled	Released: 2003; Label: LBS Records (LBS077CD)
Keep on the Sunnyside	Released: 2004; Label:
My Saddle Bag Dreams	Released: 2005; Label: Kross Kut Records (KKR107CD)
New Traditions	Released: 2006; Label: Dean Perrett (DPE001)
Return of the Stockman	Released: 2007; Label: Dean Perrett
A Thousand Campfires	Released: 2008; Label: Dean Perrett
Cattle Town	Released: November 2011; Label: Dean Perrett
My Bush Heritage	Released: 2013; Label: Dean Perrett
The Shelter of the Cross	Released: 2013; Label: Dean Perrett
I'm the Land	Released: July 2014; Label: Dean Perrett (DPE007)
Dusty Sky	Released: January 2016; Label: Dean Perrett, Checked Label
Aussie Favourites Bluegrassed	Released: March 2017; Label: Dean Perrett, Checked Label
Earn Your Spurs	Released: August 2018; Label: Dean Perrett, Checked Label
Kind Seasons	Released: February 2021; Label: Dean Perrett, Checked Label
The Sweetest Verse	Released: January 2024; Label: Dean Perrett, Checked Label
Bush Troubadour	Released: June 2025; Label: Dean Perrett, Checked Label
Close to Home	Released: May 2026; Label: Dean Perrett, Checked Label

== Awards and nominations ==
=== Country Music Awards of Australia ===
The Country Music Awards of Australia (CMAA) (also known as the Golden Guitar Awards) is an annual awards night held in January during the Tamworth Country Music Festival, celebrating recording excellence in the Australian country music industry. They have been held annually since 1973.

Year	Nominee / work	Award	Result (wins only)
2012	"Channel Country Ground" (by Dean Perrett & Lee Kernaghan)	Bush Ballad of the Year	Won
2015	"My Country, My Land" (by Dean Perrett & Troy Cassar-Daley)	Vocal Collaboration of the Year	Won
2015	"Bloodwood & Clover" by Dean Perrett	Bush Ballad of the Year	Won
2015	himself	Hands of Fame	imprinted
2018	"Henbury Blues" by Dean Perrett	Bush Ballad of the Year	Won
2021	"Six decks to Darwin" by Dean Perrett	Bush Ballad of the Year	Won
2023	"Out on Killarney" by Dean Perrett	Bush Ballad of the Year	Won

=== Tamworth Songwriters Awards ===
The Tamworth Songwriters Association (TSA) is an annual songwriting contest for original country songs, awarded in January at the Tamworth Country Music Festival. They commenced in 1986. Dean Perrett has won eleven awards.

Year	Nominee / work	Award	Result (wins only)
2002	"The Shelter of the Cross" by Dean Perrett	Gospel Song of the Year	Won
2004	"Hold On to Jesus" by Dean Perrett	Gospel Song of the Year	Won
2005	"No Greater Friend" by Dean Perrett	Gospel Song of the Year	Won
2005	"No Greater Friend" by Dean Perrett	Country Song of the Year	Won
2011	"The Shepherd's Fold" by Dean Perrett	Gospel Song of the Year	Won
2012	"There's Room at the Cross" by Dean Perrett and Sherry Foster	Gospel Song of the Year	Won
2014	"Hilda's Rest" by Dean Perrett	Country Song of the Year	Won
2014	"Hilda's Rest" by Dean Perrett	Country Ballad of the Year	Won
2015	"Coopers Creek" by Dean Perrett	Traditional Bush Ballad of the Year	Won
2015	"Fear God" by Dean Perrett	Alt. Blues and Bluegrass of the Year	Won
2015	"The Lighthouse" by Dean Perrett	Gospel Song of the Year	Won
