= The Morning After (1974 film) =

1974 television film by Richard T. Heffron

- Genre: Drama
- Based on: The Morning After by Jack B. Weiner (as Jack Weiner)
- Teleplay by: Richard Matheson
- Directed by: Richard T. Heffron
- Starring: Dick Van Dyke; Lynn Carlin; Don Porter
- Theme music composer: Pete Carpenter; Mike Post
- Country of origin: United States
- Original language: English

Production
- Executive producer: Lawrence Turman
- Producer: Stan Margulies
- Cinematography: Michel Hugo
- Editor: David Newhouse
- Running time: 74 minutes
- Production company: Wolper Productions

Original release
- Network: ABC
- Release: February 13, 1974

The Morning After is a 1974 American made-for-television drama film starring Dick Van Dyke and Lynn Carlin, based on the best selling novel by Jack B. Weiner, and with a screenplay by Richard Matheson. It was originally aired as an ABC Movie of the Week.

== Plot ==
Charlie Lester is a public relations speech writer for an oil magnate. He is married with two children. As the film opens we see him drinking heavily at an office party and then having an argument with his wife Fran after he tipsily returns home. The song "Yesterday", sung by Joey Scarbury, is played several times in the film as Charlie continues in a downward spiral. He is given a jolting reason to quit drinking after his boss scolds him for appearing half drunk at an important business meeting, then ruining a dinner party at his home and even hitting his wife in a drunken rage. He is shown afterwards literally on his knees, begging her forgiveness.

It is revealed in the film that Charlie's father was an alcoholic and his mother was abusive, ignoring him while lavishing her affections on his younger brother. He breaks down as he tells this story to a therapist. In massive denial and pain, he drops out of therapy and continues to drink, culminating in a physical assault on Fran as she tries to drag him out of a bar. When he returns home, she informs him she is seeing a lawyer and filing assault charges. Charlie then becomes violently ill and vomits blood. His doctor informs him he may be suffering from liver damage and "either you stop drinking or you're going to drink yourself to death!"

In a desperate attempt to stop, Charlie takes a vacation and goes alone to a seaside resort. He winds up passed out on the beach. He suffers a terrifying attack of delirium tremens and wakes up in a mental ward. Even in this desperate circumstance, Fran stays with him and his sympathetic doctor informs him he can be helped, but his recovery is entirely up to him. Shortly afterward, Charlie escapes from the hospital and goes to a bar. He calls Fran and tearfully apologizes for all the pain he has caused her. He tells her he loves her and their children with all his heart but "It's no use...there's just no point...I'm no damn good, I never was...goodbye, my heart." The final scene shows Charlie alone, drunk and hopeless on a deserted beachfront.

== Cast ==
- Dick Van Dyke - Charlie Lester
- Lynn Carlin - Fran Lester
- Don Porter - Rudy King
- Linda Lavin - Toni
- Jewel Blanch - Karen Lester
- Joshua Bryant - Dr. Emmett
- Richard Derr - Dr. Tillman

== Production background ==
Van Dyke played a successful public relations writer who has a serious drinking problem that threatens his marriage and life. Around this time, Van Dyke admitted he himself was an alcoholic and had been seeking treatment (one of the first celebrities to do so). This film also marked Van Dyke's first real attempt to escape his Rob Petrie image. Van Dyke was nominated for an Emmy Award for Best Lead Actor in a Drama but lost to Hal Holbrook. The film is still shown in some treatment centers.
