= Tracy Coster =

Australian singer-songwriter (born 1966)

Tracy Coster (born 12 April 1966) is an Australian country music singer and songwriter. Her father, Stan Coster, was an acknowledged songwriter.

== Early life ==
Coster was born on 12 April 1966, It is hard to determine the time Tracy Coster started her career. She was born into country music, and she grew up with the music her father Stan wrote. Tracy started singing in her father's band when she was about thirteen, and she was determined to become a country star. The family led a travelling life from one gig to the other.

== Recording career ==
- 1985 - release of the first single "Why Do I Feel Like Crying'"
- 1987 - released debut album From The Heart
- 1991 - released album The Girl in the Band - "City Sidewalks" and "Don't say Goodbye" became Top 10 hit singles
- 1993 - released the album Play the Game
- 2000 - released her first bush ballads album Bush Baby
- 2004 - released Coster Country - a tribute to her father Stan Coster
- 2006 - released single "I Don't Want To Talk About Rain"

== Achievements ==
- 1986 - CMAA Golden Guitar Awards Finalist in Female Vocalist of the Year
- 1994 - Inducted into the Hands of Fame in Tamworth
- 1994 - CMAA Golden Guitar Finalist for Female Vocalist of the Year with the Brian Poole and the Tremolos remake 'Someone'
- 2004 - Named Australian Independent Country Music Award Heritage Track of the Year 'Bush Barbeque'
- 2005 - Named CMAA Golden Guitar Awards Vocal Collaboration of the Year with Anne Kirkpatrick for 'Back to the Saltbush Plains'’
- 2005 - Named Australian Independent Country Music Awards Album of the Year
- 2005 - Named Stan Coster Bush Ballad Awards Album of the Year 'Coster Country'
- 2005 - Named Stan Coster Bush Ballad Awards Comedy Song of the Year 'Loaded Dog'
- 2006 - Finalist in the ACMLA People's Choice Awards for Best Bush Ballad of the Year
