= Arthur Blanch =

Australian country singer-songwriter (1928–2023)

Background information
- Born: 1 November 1928; Tamworth, New South Wales, Australia
- Died: 26 July 2023 (aged 94)
- Genre: Country
- Occupations: Singer, musician, songwriter
- Instrument: Vocals
- Formerly of: The Blanch Family

Arthur Blanch (1 November 1928 – 26 July 2023) was an Australian country singer-songwriter. He was the father of country music singer, Jewel Blanch, with whom he has performed.

== Life and career ==
Arthur Blanch was born on 1 November 1928 at Wollun, near Tamworth, New South Wales, where his parents were sheep farmers. In the late 1940's, Blanch began entering talent quests and in 1949 won Australia's Amateur Hour which led to Blanch signing his first recording contract in the 1950's.

Blanch married Berice Collins in Glen Innes, New South Wales on 6 February 1954. In 1958 their daughter Jewel was born.

In 1962 the Blanch Family were signed to W&G label in Melbourne. The three family members becoming known for recording collaborations and touring together, relocating to the United States in 1968 where they established themselves as performers which included appearances on the Grand Ole Opry.

Blanch achieved success in America during the late 1970's with his songs "The Little Man's Got The Biggest Smile" and "Maybe I'll Cry Over You" both entering Billboard's Hot Country Songs chart. The family moved back to Australia in 1980 where they based themselves in Queensland.

At both the 1982 and 1983 Country Music Awards of Australia, Blanch won Golden Guitars for Album of the Year, the first of which was a duet album he released with his daughter Jewel, The Lady and the Cowboy, and the other for Too Late for Regrets. Blanch then won Golden Guitars in 1984 and 1985, both being awarded for Male Vocalist of the Year.

Blanch again collaborated with his daughter to write a television special called The Lady and the Cowboy which starred Smoky Dawson, Allan Caswell and Johnny Chester among others, and aired in both Australia and the United States. In 1986, Blanch again relocated to the United States when he and his wife moved to Nashville.

In 2004, Blanch and his wife Berice published a biographical book Woolun One: The Story of the Blanch Family.

In 2001, Arthur was inducted into the Australian Roll of Renown. He was awarded the Tamworth Songwriter's Association Award in 2007.

Arthur Blanch died on 26 July 2023, at the age of 94.

== Discography ==
=== Albums ===
| Title | Album details |
|---|---|
| Meet the Blanch Family (as part of The Blanch Family) | Released: 1960s; Format: LP; Label: W&G (WG-B-1705) |
| The Lady and the Cowboy (with Jewel Blanch) | Released: 1981; Format: LP, Cassette; Label: CBS (SBP 237632) |
| Too Late for Regrets | Released: 1982; Format: LP, Cassette; Label: CBS (SBP 237843) |
| What Do Lonely People Do | Released: 1983; Format: LP, Cassette; Label: EMI (EMX-240253) |
| Blanch Family Classics (as part of The Blanch Family) | Released: November 1983; Format: LP, Cassette; Label: Axis (AX.1183); Compilation album |
| Long Way Home | Released: 1986; Format: LP, Cassette; Label: Sundown Records (SUN 0163) |
| Songs of Praise and Inspiration | Released: 1998; Format: CD; Label: Tamworth Music (TCD-101) |
| Gems & A Few Jewels Volume 3 | Released: 2003; Format: CD; Label: Tamworth Music (TCD-105); Compilation album |
| Life's Been Good to Me | Released: 2007; Format: CD; Label: Tamworth Music (TCD-07) |
| What Really Matters | Released: 2008; Format: CD; Label: Tamworth Music (TCD-108) |
| How Can I Thank You | Released: 2009; Format: CD; Label: Tamworth Music (TCD-109) |
| The Best of Arthur Blanch | Released: 2016; Format: CD; Label: Tamworth Music (TCD-113); Compilation album |

== Awards ==
=== Australian Roll of Renown ===
The Australian Roll of Renown honours Australian and New Zealander musicians who have shaped the music industry by making a significant and lasting contribution to Country Music. It was inaugurated in 1976 and the inductee is announced at the Country Music Awards of Australia in Tamworth in January.

| Year | Nominee / work | Award | Result |
|---|---|---|---|
| 2001 | Arthur Blanch | Australian Roll of Renown | inductee |

=== Country Music Awards of Australia ===
The Country Music Awards of Australia (CMAA) (also known as the Golden Guitar Awards) is an annual awards night held in January during the Tamworth Country Music Festival, celebrating recording excellence in the Australian country music industry. They have been held annually since 1973.

| Year | Nominee / work | Award | Result (wins only) |
|---|---|---|---|
| 1982 | The Lady and the Cowboy (with Jewel Blanch) | Album of the Year | Won |
| 1983 | Too Late For Regrets | Album of the Year | Won |
| 1984 | "I've Come a Long Way" | Male Vocalist of the Year | Won |
| 1985 | "What Do Lonely People Do" | Male Vocalist of the Year | Won |

=== Tamworth Songwriters Awards ===
The Tamworth Songwriters Association (TSA) is an annual songwriting contest for original country songs, awarded in January at the Tamworth Country Music Festival. They commenced in 1986.

| Year | Nominee / work | Award | Result (wins only) |
|---|---|---|---|
| 2007 | Arthur Blanch | Songmaker Award | awarded |
