= Baffled! =

1973 American-British TV film by Philip Leacock

- Genre: Thriller
- Written by: Theodore Apstein
- Directed by: Philip Leacock
- Starring: Leonard Nimoy; Susan Hampshire; Rachel Roberts; Vera Miles
- Music by: Richard Hill
- Country of origin: United States; United Kingdom
- Original language: English

Production
- Executive producer: Norman Felton
- Producer: Philip Leacock
- Cinematography: Ken Hodges
- Editor: Bill Blunden
- Running time: 90 minutes (American version); 100 minutes (UK version)
- Production companies: Arena Productions; ITC Entertainment

Original release
- Network: NBC
- Release: January 30, 1973

Baffled! is a 1973 American-British made-for-television supernatural mystery film directed by Philip Leacock. The story is part of the occult detective subgenre and stars Leonard Nimoy, Susan Hampshire, and Vera Miles.

Baffled! was intended as a pilot for a television series but when no network showed interest it was released in British theatres and later released as a television film in America on NBC. The British version runs ten minutes longer than the American.

== Plot ==
Race car driver Tom Kovack suddenly begins to experience psychic visions. He meets Michelle Brent, an expert on the paranormal, and the two form an unlikely partnership. Kovack's visions draw them into an occult-themed mystery at a remote inn on the English coast.

== Cast ==
- Leonard Nimoy as Tom Kovack
- Susan Hampshire as Michele Brent
- Rachel Roberts as Mrs. Farraday
- Vera Miles as Andrea Glenn
- Jewel Blanch as Jennifer Glenn
- Valerie Taylor as Louise Sanford
- Ray Brooks as George Tracewell
- Angharad Rees as Peggy Tracewell
- Christopher Benjamin as Verelli

== Home release ==
Scorpion Releasing, in conjunction with ITV, released a DVD of Baffled! in 2014. The DVD included both the UK version and U.S versions of the film.
