= Against a Crooked Sky =

1975 film

- Theatrical release poster
- Directed by: Earl Bellamy
- Written by: Douglas C. Stewart (written by) & Eleanor Lamb (written by)
- Produced by: Lyman Dayton (producer); Dan Greer (associate producer)
- Starring: Richard Boone; Stewart Petersen; Henry Wilcoxon
- Cinematography: Joe Jackman; Bernie Abramson
- Edited by: Marsh Hendry
- Music by: Lex de Azevedo
- Distributed by: Doty-Dayton Releasing
- Release date: December 1975
- Running time: 89 minutes
- Country: United States
- Language: English
- Box office: $2.3 million (US/Canada rentals) or $2,273,000

Against a Crooked Sky is a 1975 American Western film directed by Earl Bellamy, starring Richard Boone, Stewart Petersen, and Henry Wilcoxon.

== Plot summary ==
Charlotte, the daughter of the pioneer family Sutter, is kidnapped by a mysterious Indian tribe. Her father John leads a search party to find her. Sam, his son, pursues her on his own. As he nearly drowns, a broken-down, drunk prospector called Russian and his dog save him. After two weeks, John has to release the party and starts searching on his own. Some time after, he returns, totally exhausted and wounded, claiming Charlotte has to be dead, because he looked everywhere and could not find her. Sam now convinces the Russian, who knows the region better than others, to help him find his sister, by reminding him of the gold arm rings of the indians. They also find no trace.

But then, they meet a tribe of Cheyenne. The man who seems to be their medicine man needs both to find the "Crooked Sky", the mysterious tribe. Crossing their territory, they are attacked by Apaches. They can beat them back, but the dog looses his life and the medicine man is badly wounded, but he is still able to lead them to some mountains. The next day, the sun reveals the entrance to the mystic place.
They find a totem pole of stone with golden traces - and get caught by the tribe they have been searching for so long. A lot of the indians wear gold jewelry. After some words, the medicine man gets slaughtered by the chief in the night. Askea, an indian girl who has learned english, helps them talking to the chief who claims Charlotte killed the medicine man. She will die - when Sam fails to test in a deadly, ritual race against the sun that no one seemingly ever won.

Sam has to arrive at the sacrifice place until noon. His sister is blindfolded unter a piece of cloth and has to stand on the cliff. Sam prays and arrives just in time. Exactly as the chief shoots his arrow, Sam crosses the golden sun clock on the mountains. His sister falls to death. Sam returns home and tells his parents, living with the indians, Charlotte died of a fever.

But suddenly Charlotte appears. She explains, that Ashkea took her place and therefore it was her who died. Charlotte shows them her newborn son - of her former indian husband. But he followed them, now knowing that she survived. He turns his horse and heads to his home - alone.

== Cast ==
- Richard Boone as Russian
- Stewart Petersen as Sam Sutter
- Henry Wilcoxon as Cut Tongue / Narrator
- Clint Ritchie as John Sutter
- Shannon Farnon as Molly Sutter
- Jewel Blanch as Charlotte Sutter
- Brenda Venus as Ashkea
- Geoffrey Land as Temkai
- Gordon Hanson as Chief Shumeki
- Vince St. Cyr as Cheyenne Chief Shokobob
- Margaret Willey as Old Hag
- Norman Walke as Milt Adams
- George Dale as Bob
- Bar Killer as B'ar Killer

== Production ==
Parts of the film were shot in Professor Valley, Martin Ranch, Pace Creek, Castle Valley, Dud's Bottom, Arches National Park, Dead Horse Point, and the Dolores River in Utah.

The novelisation was issued by Eleanor Lamb and Douglas Stewart, Bantam Books, 1976.

== Soundtrack ==
- Jewel Blanch - "Against a Crooked Sky" (Music by Lex de Azevedo, lyrics by Mac David)

== See also ==
- List of American films of 1975
- List of films in the public domain in the United States
