= Tim McNamara (musician) =

Australian musician (1922–1983)

- Born: 10 October 1922; Lucknow, New South Wales, Australia
- Died: 16 April 1983 (aged 60); Sydney, New South Wales, Australia
- Occupation: country music performer
- Spouse: Daphne Ford (m. 1940)

Timothy Edmund McNamara (10 October 1922 – 16 April 1983) was an Australian country music performer, radio presenter and talent scout.

Born in Lucknow, New South Wales, near Orange, McNamara was the youngest of eleven children. He found work as a boundary rider at the age of 12 on a sheep station. After his family relocated from Orange to Sydney, McNamara remained in the Orange area and worked on dairy farms after leaving school. Inspired by performers such as Tex Morton, McNamara learnt how to sing, yodel and play guitar.

In 1940, he married Daphne Ford, after which he served in the Royal Australian Air Force during World War II.

It was following the war, McNamara made a name for himself as an entertainer, writing and performing songs such as "Riding Along" and "We're Going To The Rodeo Today", which he recorded at his first recording session in 1948. He also appeared in the Australian film, Into the Straight.

In 1949, McNamara commenced work as a radio presenter at Sydney radio station 2SM where he hosted a popular country music program. McNamara's program has been credited with boosting the popularity of such artists as Slim Dusty, Joy McKean and Gordon Parsons.

McNamara launched a national talent show in 1950, which was sponsored by 2SM and Rodeo Records. The popularity of the inaugural talent show which was won by Reg Lindsay, helped establish it as an annual event.

McNamara's career spanned the decades between the 1950s and 1980s, recording for such labels as Festival Records and EMI.

== Legacy ==
In 1978, McNamara was part of the second group of well known country music performers to imprint their hands into the "Australian Country Music Hands of Fame" monument which had been erected the previous year in Tamworth, New South Wales.

At the 1981 Golden Guitar Awards in Tamworth, McNamara was named as the sixth person to be elected onto the Australian Roll of Renown.

A wax sculpture of McNamara is situated in the Gallery of Stars Wax Museum at the Big Golden Guitar Tourist Centre in Tamworth, which was opened by Slim Dusty in 1988.

In 2002, McNamara was posthumously added to the Australian Country Music Broadcasters Hall of Fame.

== Death ==
McNamara died from cancer in Sydney on 16 April 1983.
