= Reg Poole =

Australian country singer-songwriter (born 1944)

Reg Poole OAM
- Born: Reginald Allen Poole; 24 September 1944 (age 81); Rushworth, Victoria
- Genres: country
- Occupations: Singer, musician, songwriter
- Instrument: Vocals

Reginald Allen Poole is an Australian country singer-songwriter. Poole won three Golden Guitars, was inducted into the Roll of Renown in 2006, was awarded an OAM for services to country music in 2006 and in 2016 was elevated to Country Music Living Legend, an award designed to honour the achievements of those who have made a lasting contribution to country music in Australia and are actively engaged in writing, recording and performing.

== Career ==
Poole left his dairy farm in the 1970s to pursue a career in music and won his first Golden Guitar in 1974.

In 1977, Poole signed with Selection Records, releasing several highly successful recordings over the next three decades, and became well known for concept albums, particularly with rodeo and truck themes.

== Discography ==
=== Albums ===
Title	Album details
Country Music At Its Best (as Reg Poole and the Country Trend)	Released: 1974; Format: LP; Label: W&G (WG.35/S/5646)
The Long Paddock	Released: 1977; Format: LP; Label: Larrikin Records (LRF021)
Goin' Rodeoin'	Released: 1978; Format: LP, Cassette; Label: Selection Records (PRL-001)
Rigs and Roads	Released: 1979; Format: LP, Cassette; Label: Selection Records (PRML 012)
From the Cradle to the Saddle	Released: 1980; Format: LP, Cassette; Label: Selection Records (PRML 020)
The Way It Used to Be	Released: 1981; Format: LP, Cassette; Label: Selection Records (PRL 025)
Rodeo Fever	Released: 1981; Format: LP, Cassette; Label: Selection Records (PRML 026)
Candles and Wine	Released: 1983; Format: LP, Cassette; Label: Selection Records (PRL 036)
When the Big Mobs Came to Burke	Released: 1983; Format: LP, Cassette; Label: Selection Records (PRL 038)
Shootin' Up On Rodeo (with Tom McIvor)	Released: 1984; Format: LP, Cassette; Label: Selection Records (PRL 043)
Woman of the West	Released: 1985; Format: LP, Cassette; Label: Selection Records (PRL 045)
I Love This Land Australia	Released: 1988; Format: LP, Cassette; Label: Festival Records (L 19250)
The Ghosts of 2KM	Released: 1994; Format: CD; Label: Selection Records (PCD 078)
Old Mates and Chute Gates	Released: 1995; Format: CD; Label: Selection Records (PCD 083)
A Letter to Buddy	Released: 1999; Format: CD; Label: Selection Records (PRC 095)
Music's Been Good to Me	Released: May 2017; Format: CD, DD; Label: Reg Poole
The Good Old Days	Released: August 2017; Format: CD, DD; Label: Reg Poole

== Awards ==
=== Australian Roll of Renown ===
The Australian Roll of Renown honours Australian and New Zealander musicians who have shaped the music industry by making a significant and lasting contribution to Country Music. It was first awarded in 1976, and each new inductee is announced at the Country Music Awards of Australia in Tamworth in January.

Year	Nominee / work	Award	Result
2006	Reg Poole	Australian Roll of Renown	inductee

=== Country Music Awards of Australia ===
The Country Music Awards of Australia (CMAA) (also known as the Golden Guitar Awards) is an annual awards night held in January during the Tamworth Country Music Festival, celebrating recording excellence in the Australian country music industry. They have been held annually since 1973.

Year	Nominee / work	Award	Result
1974	Reg Poole	New Talent of the Year	Won
1981	"The Warrumbungle Mare "	Heritage Award	Won
1985	"When the Big Mobs Came to Bourke"	Heritage Award	Won

=== Tamworth Songwriters Awards ===
The Tamworth Songwriters Association (TSA) is an annual songwriting contest for original country songs, awarded in January at the Tamworth Country Music Festival. They commenced in 1986.

Year	Nominee / work	Award	Result (wins only)
2014	Reg Poole	Songmaker Award	awarded
