= Rick and Thel Carey =

- Also known as: The Sliprail Swingsters
- Origin: Sydney, New South Wales, Australia
- Genres: Country
- Years active: 1947–1987
- Labels: Regal Zonophone; Hadley
- Past members: Richard Carey; Thelma Carey

Rick and Thel Carey were an Australian country music duo, consisting of husband and wife Richard Bruce Carey (13 August 1927 – 28 July 2017) and Thelma Claurine Carey (née Hoctor; 9 October 1929 – 2 October 1998).

Rick Carey, originally from Sydney and Thelma Hoctor, who grew up in Glossodia, commenced their respective careers as solo artists. However, after they met in the 1940s, they established themselves as a duo, the Sliprail Swingsters. Following their win on Australia's Amateur Hour in 1950, they married in 1952 and became Rick and Thel. They toured Australia extensively, and were referred to as country music's "singing sweethearts" and then as "Mr. & Mrs. Country".

After many appearances and a short tour out of Sydney with The Reg Lindsay Show, in 1958 Rick & Thel were part of the All Star Western Show along with Chad Morgan, Kevin King, Nev Nicholls and Peter Mollerson on the fiddle. In 1959, they toured with The Chad Morgan Show, this was followed by their own traveling shows. Rick first introduced his comical creation 'Cousin Ratsack' onto the All Star Western Show in 1958 and continued the act for thirty years or so.

In 1969, their concert at Bourke was marred by the crowd's poor behaviour during their performance. Rick said he had never played in front of such a poorly behaved crowd and would impose stricter conditions of entry for future concerts; he considered reducing audience numbers to ensure the enjoyment of attendees.

They had a successful recording career with record labels Regal Zonophone Records, which became EMI, and then in later years with Hadley Records. Their popular songs include "She Was Happy Til She Met You", "I'll Never Be Fooled Again", "Looking Back to See", "You Can Say That Again", "White Crosses in the Jungle", "You Thought I Thought", "Rusted Love", "Fourteen Red Roses for Jenny", "He's a... She's a..." and "I'll Take the Dog".

After 35 years of touring and performing throughout Australia as Rick and Thel, they retired in 1987 and settled on a property near Denmark, Western Australia, when Thel became ill. Thel Carey died on 2 October 1998.

Following Thel's death, Rick was active in a local country music club in Denmark, becoming its patron in 2001. Despite moving to Brisbane in 2005, Rick continued in his role as the club's patron. In 2007, Rick released another album, Beyond the Dream. It featured other country music artists as guests along with his daughter, Lynne. Rick Carey died on 28 July 2017.

== Legacy ==
In 1977, Rick and Thel were part of the first group of Australian country performers to have their hands imprinted into the new Australian Country Music "Hands of Fame" monument in Tamworth.

The Australian Roll of Renown honours Australians and New Zealanders who have shaped the music industry by making a significant and lasting contribution to Country Music. It was inaugurated in 1976 where each inductee is announced at the Country Music Awards of Australia in Tamworth in January.

Year	Nominee / work	Award	Result
1985	Rick and Thel Carey	Australian Roll of Renown	inductee

There are wax figures of Rick and Thel in the Gallery of Stars Wax Museum within the Big Golden Guitar Tourist Centre, Tamworth, which was officially opened in 1988.
