= Rex Dallas =

Australian musician

- Born: Frederick Amos Doble; 6 November 1938 (age 88); Wallerawang, NSW Australia
- Genres: Country; bush ballad; rock 'n' roll; light operetta
- Occupations: Musician; singer; songwriter; yodeller; bush balladeer
- Years active: 1953–present
- Labels: EMI Records, Hadley Records

Rex Dallas (born Frederick Amos Doble; 6 November 1938) is an Australian country musician, singer, songwriter, yodeller and bush balladeer. His albums also include selections of horse songs, war songs, mother songs and even one on the theme of coalmining.

== Early life ==
Dallas was born as Frederick Amos Doble, in Wallerawang, a small mining town near Lithgow, New South Wales. Dallas inherited a love of bush poetry through a close friendship with his grandfather, who regularly read poems to him.

== Career ==
Dallas first appeared on local radio 2LT Lithgow, at the age of 15. One year later, he relocated to Sydney. He later toured with Lee "Stubby" Gordon and made his first single 'Bicycle Wreck' for EMI Records in 1960. From the early 1970s, Dallas toured extensively, accompanied by his band, the Dallas Cowboys. In 1981, Dallas featured in a television documentary about his touring show. When not touring with his country show, he regularly entertained at his own venue, Gully Park, in Moonbi, northern NSW.

== Personal life ==
Rex married Adrienne Francis James in 1961. They have four sons - Brett, Colin, Jeffrey and Shannan. In 1989, Dallas purchased “Gully Park” property in Moonbi, near Tamworth NSW. In 2010, they sold "Gully Park" and bought a residence in Manilla NSW. His granddaughter Ashleigh Dallas is also a country singer songwriter and musician .

== Discography ==
=== Albums ===
List of albums
Title	Details
The Harry Torrani Yodelling Album	Released: 1975; Label: Hadley Records (HLP 1223); Format: LP, Cassette
The Harry Torrani Yodelling Album Vol.2	Released: 1975; Label: Hadley Records (HLP 1224); Format: LP, Cassette
In the Days When I Was Me	Released: 1976; Label: Hadley Records (HLP 1226); Format: LP, Cassette
I Love the Old Bush Ballad Songs	Released: 1977; Label: Hadley Records (HLP 1234); Format: LP, Cassette
Old Wallerawang	Released: 1978; Label: Hadley Records (HLP 1239); Format: LP, Cassette
Here's to the Song Writer	Released: 1979; Label: Hadley Records (HLP 1244); Format: LP, Cassette
Yodelling Mad	Released: 1979; Label: Hadley Records (HLP 1255); Format: LP, Cassette
Buckjump and Saddle Tales	Released: 1981; Label: Hadley Records (HLP 1262); Format: LP, Cassette
Remembering Those Hillbilly Hits	Released: 1982; Label: Hadley Records (HLP 1267); Format: LP, Cassette
Mothers Flower Garden	Released: 1982; Label: Hadley Records (HLP 1275); Format: LP, Cassette
Easy Lovin'	Released: 1984; Label: Hadley Records (HLP 1280); Format: LP, Cassette
Born to the Saddle	Released: 1984; Label: Hadley Records (HLP 1284); Format: LP, Cassette
For Valour	Released: 1985; Label: Hadley Records (HLP 1288); Format: LP, Cassette
Duelling Yodellers (with Owen Blundell)	Released: 1988; Label: Briar Records (BLP 2); Format: LP, Cassette
We Dig Coal	Released: 1990; Label: Sundown Records (SUN 0420); Format: LP, Cassette, CD
Heart Lands	Released: 1994; Label: Hadley Records (HCDM 1310); Format: CD
Songs of My Country	Released: 1995; Label: LBS Records (LBS022CD); Format: CD
24 Harry Torrani	Released: 1996; Label: Hadley Records (HCDM 1314); Format: CD
Show Boat Kalang	Released: 2018; Label: William Osland Consulting (7652935); Format: CD

== Awards ==
=== Australian Roll of Renown ===
The Australian Roll of Renown honours Australian and New Zealander musicians who have shaped the music industry by making a significant and lasting contribution to Country Music. It was inaugurated in 1976 and the inductee is announced at the Country Music Awards of Australia in Tamworth in January.

Year	Nominee / work	Award	Result
2000	Rex Dallas	Australian Roll of Renown	inductee

=== Country Music Awards of Australia ===
The Country Music Awards of Australia (CMAA) (also known as the Golden Guitar Awards) is an annual awards night held in January during the Tamworth Country Music Festival, celebrating recording excellence in the Australian country music industry. They have been held annually since 1973.

Year	Nominee / work	Award	Result (wins only)
1975	Old Wallerawang	EP of the Year	Won
1976	"My Lancashire Yodelling Lass"	Male Vocalist of the Year	Won
1977	himself	Hands of Fame	imprinted
1982	"His Spurs Are Rusty Now" (with Colin Dallas)	APRA Song of the Year	Won
1992	"The Western Main"	Heritage Award	Won

=== Tamworth Songwriters Awards ===
The Tamworth Songwriters Association (TSA) is an annual songwriting contest for original country songs, awarded in January at the Tamworth Country Music Festival. They commenced in 1986.

Year	Nominee / work	Award	Result (wins only)
2001	Rex Dallas	Songmaker Award	awarded
