= Buddy Williams (country musician) =

Australian musician (1918–1986)

- Also known as: The Yodelling Jackaroo
- Born: Harry Taylor; 5 September 1918; Sydney, New South Wales, Australia
- Died: 5 September 1986 (aged 68) Queensland, Australia
- Genres: Country music
- Occupations: Singer-songwriter; travelling showman; rodeo rider
- Instrument: Guitar
- Years active: 1936–1986
- Labels: Private Recordings (1935), Regal Zonophone, EMI (1939–1964), RCA (1964–1986)

Buddy Williams (5 September 1918 – 12 December 1986), born as Harry Taylor and also known as Harold Williams, was an Australian country music singer-songwriter and musician, known as "The Yodelling Jackaroo".

Although country music originated from the Southern United States, Williams was the first Australian to record country music in Australia, two years after New Zealander Tex Morton made his first recording in Australia.

Williams recorded his songs about life and times in the Australian bush and it was with Williams that the bush ballad was first born. In 2007, Williams's recording of "Give A Little Credit To Dad", complete with trademark yodel, was added to the Sounds of Australia project by the National Film and Sound Archive.

Williams was an inspiration for numerous country stars that followed, such as Slim Dusty.

== Early life and background ==
Buddy Williams was born Harry Taylor in the Sydney suburb of Newtown and was soon placed in Glebe Point Orphanage. After many failed escape bids as a child, he was fostered out as a young boy to a dairy-farming family at Dorrigo on the north coast of New South Wales (NSW). It soon became apparent that rather than looking for a new child to bring up, the family was more interested in an unpaid laborer. This was not uncommon in the Depression and post-Depression era where rural child slavery was a fact of life. Times were hard, and life on the farm was tough for young Williams, but it also allowed freedom he never had in the orphanage. He would listen to recordings on an old gramophone of his favourite singers such as Jimmie Rodgers and fell in love with this new music that would become known as country music. At age 15, he ran away from his foster home and began working for other families in the district. He worked at many jobs and started busking around the north coast of NSW, dodging the police who at the time frowned upon such activities. Naughty ratbags

His niece was Lenore Miller who recorded some songs with him for the Regal Zonophone Records label.

== Career ==
Buddy Williams made his first recordings in 1938, a Private Process disk. The two songs recorded at this session were "Where The Jacarandas Bloom" and "They Call Me The Clarence River Yodeller". The latter song was re-worked, called "They Call Me The Ramblin' Yodeller" and recorded during his first EMI session on 7 September 1939. These two long-lost recordings were later released on a Kingfisher Records collection in the early 1990s as part of an early Buddy Williams catalogue re-release, which is no longer available.

Williams first sang professionally in 1936 at the Grafton Jacaranda Festival in northern NSW. He also did a guest spot on Grafton's radio station 2GF at the time. He left the town of Grafton and busked his way down the NSW coast before approaching EMI records in Sydney where he gained an audition.

The Page family from Newcastle, who had befriended the young Williams, bought him a black Gibson L-00 acoustic guitar which he used on all his recordings during the 1940s. This guitar was accidentally destroyed while on tour in the late 1940s. Williams later recalled that he had spent his entire life trying to find a replacement guitar that had the same sound quality of his old Gibson, but he never found one. Some of the guitars Williams used during his career included Gibson Hummingbird, Gibson Country and Western, Gibson J-200, and Martin D 28.

On 7 September 1939, he recorded six songs for the Regal Zonophone label. In September 1939, Australia entered WWII and Williams enlisted in the army. During the war years, many of Williams's recording sessions were done while on leave from active service. In the final days of WWII he was seriously wounded during the battle of Balikpapan and was not expected to live. He was recommended for the Military Medal and carried the mass of scars from his injuries for the rest of his life.

In 1948 Williams starred in a short film titled He Chased The Chicken which featured live performances of two of his recordings, "The Overlander Trail" and "The Chicken Song". The studio versions of these songs had been recorded in 1946. Another live song in the film titled "Dear Little Lady of Mine" was never recorded nor released on record. Williams was also meant to appear in the 1946 Australian movie "The Overlanders" with Chips Rafferty, but was unable to obtain leave from the army at the time.

After the war was over and he had recovered from his injuries, he set about forming a travelling rodeo tent show. He eventually wound back his rodeo and tent show after many years and then toured for 11 months of each year with the Buddy Williams Variety Show.

Though Williams performed mostly in country towns and outback communities, having once commented that during his long touring career he had performed in just about every country town in Australia, he also performed a small number of shows in major cities. During 1940 he played the Theatre Royal, Sydney alongside Roy Rene and Evie Hayes. He also did an eight-week stint at Brisbane's Theatre Royal. In 1973 he played Sydney's Hordern Pavilion for the UNICEF concert alongside big-name American acts such as Tex Ritter and Wanda Jackson. In the early 1980s, Williams did a small number of Sydney shows including shows at the Auburn Baseball Club, the Seven Hills RSL Club, and a show at the Star Hotel in the heart of China Town Sydney attended by Australian 1950s and 1960s rocker Col Joye.

Williams suffered the first of two massive heart attacks while on stage in the late 1970s. During one of these hospital stays, he received a call from a lifelong fan called Bert Newton, an Australian television icon. The pair became firm friends and Williams later appeared on live Australian TV on the Bert Newton Show, singing "The Overlander Trail" with guitar accompaniment.

In addition to constant touring, Williams continued to record. During 1965, he moved to RCA records where he became a Gold Record recording artist and recorded a large number of albums. In 1977, Williams was inducted into the Australian Roll of Renown In 1980, he won the first Heritage Award at the Tamworth Country Music Festival for his song "What A Dreary Old World It Would Be".

In 1978, Buddy Williams was the subject of a documentary titled The Last of the Fair Dinkum Outback Entertainers, narrated by his good friend John Singleton. It had a film crew travel with Williams during one of his far North Queensland tours. At the time, Singleton was a well-known radio station disk jockey and advertising executive. Singleton regularly featured Williams's songs on his radio shows in the late 1970s and early 1980s. Singleton also became a regular face in the crowd at many of Williams's shows.

Williams's last recordings were made months before his death in 1986, when he was sick with terminal cancer, and released posthumously.

A number of artists have recorded Williams's songs, including Rick and Thel Carey who recorded an album of his songs. The Le Garde Twins who toured with Williams also recorded a number of his songs, as did Rex Dallas, Slim Dusty, Nev Nichols, Lindsay Butler and more recently Ashley Cook, who recorded a complete album of Williams's songs.

During the 1970s, North American country music superstar Wilf Carter also recorded a number of Williams's songs on an album of Australian songs. A number of tribute songs have been recorded by many artists including John Williamson whose song "The Last of the Pioneers" is a tribute to Williams and his contribution to Australian music.

In the early 1970s Williams gave the young Australian guitarist Tommy Emmanuel a start in his band. Emmanuel toured with Williams and was a regular session musician for him.

In 1991 a bust of Williams created by Sydney sculptor Gaye Evans Porter was installed at Bicentennial Park in the Tamworth CBD. The bust of Williams was the brainchild of Irene Morison, mother of broadcaster Barbara Morison. In 2019, the busts were repositioned from their original locations in park to line a pedestrian pathway called Pioneer's Parade at the park's entrance.

In September 2018, a special weekend of events was held in Dorrigo, New South Wales to commemorate what would have been Williams' 100th birthday. During the weekend, memorabilia relating to Williams' career was displayed at the Don Dorrigo and Guy Fawkes Historical Society Museum where a memorial plaque paying tribute to Williams was unveiled by local MP Melinda Pavey.

== Personal life ==
Williams married Bernie Burnett on 9 January 1940. They met at the Grafton Jacaranda Festival when Burnett was 13 and Williams was 17. They made several recordings together, including "Stockmen in Uniform" and "Let's Grow Old Together". They later divorced.

He married his second wife Grace Maidman in Brisbane on 31 January 1947.

Williams' 18-month-old daughter Donita was killed in Scottsdale, Tasmania on 29 November 1948 after being accidentally run over by a reversing truck at the Scottsdale Showground during preparations for one of Williams' shows. She was rushed to hospital in a critical condition where she died an hour after the accident. A coroner's inquiry was held the following day where the coroner returned a verdict of accidental death.

Williams died on 12 December 1986 and is buried in Brisbane's Lutwyche Cemetery along with his second wife Grace and their daughter Donita.

== Discography ==
=== Albums ===
List of albums, with selected chart positions
Title	Released	Label	Cat.
Buddy Williams Remembers	19 Jan 1965	RCA	L101594
Family Album	19 Jan 1966	RCA	L101693
Buddy Williams Remembers Vol:2	1967	RCA	L101786
The Williams Family	1968	RCA	L101801
Songs of the Australian Outback	1967	RCA	RDS-26-9
Buddy Sings Hank	1968	RCA	L101820
A Family Affair	1968	RCA	SL101827
The Cowboy's Life is Good Enough for Me	1969	RCA	SL101847
Sentimental Buddy	1969	RCA	SL101851
Buddy N' Shorty	1970	RCA	SL101899
Hard Times	1971	RCA	SL101900
Along the Outback Tracks	1972	RCA	SL102061
Aussie on My Mind	1972	RCA	MSL102227
Country Touch	1975	RCA	VPL10055
Hittin' the Road Again	1975	RCA	VPL10072
Thanks to You	1975	RCA	VPL10089
The Happiest Days of My Life	1976	RCA	VPL10128
Farming '77	1977	RCA	VPL10151
Trucks and Trains	1978	RCA	VPL10161
What a Dreary Old World It Would Be	1978	RCA	VAL10251
Ramblin' Round	1979	RCA	VPL10150
Wonder Valley	1980	RCA	VAL10312
An Old Hillbilly from Way Back	1981	RCA	VAL10360
A Man and His Guitar	1982	RCA	VAL10367
A Breath of Country Air	1982	RCA	VAL10377
Big Country Muster	1983	RCA	VAL10430
Take My Hand	1985	RCA	VAL10492
How's Your Memory	1986	RCA	VPL10623
The Bushland That I Love	1986	RCA	VPL10635
Buddy Williams – Reflections	1987	RCA	SPLP1023

=== Extended plays ===
List of extended plays, with selected chart positions
Title	Released	Label	Cat.
Wedding Bells	1951	EMI Columbia	SEGO 70035
"It Sure Makes You Wonder, Don't It?" / "Christmas Boogie" / "Rocky Roundup Show" / "Our Wedding"	5 Oct 1956	Regal Zonophone	G25460
The Kelly Gang	1957	EMI Columbia	SEGO 70047
Cattle Train	1966	RCA	20390
The Old North Queensland Line	1968	RCA	20470
Buddy's Country	1983	RCA	TEP0424

=== Singles ===
List of singles
Title	Released	Label	Cat.
"They Call Me The Clarence River Yodeller" / "Where The Jacarandas Bloom"	c. 1936	Private Recordings^{1}	
"That Dapple Grey Broncho Of Mine" / "They Call Me the Rambling Yodeler"	7 Sep 1939	Regal Zonophone	G23854
"Lonesome for You Mother Dear" / "Give a Little Credit to Your Dad"	7 Sep 1939	Regal Zonophone	G23855
"The Orphan's Lament" / "My Moonlight Lullaby"	7 Sep 1939	Regal Zonophone	G23856
"Happy Jackaroo" / "Dreaming of My Mother"	14 May 1940	Regal Zonophone	G24026
"A Cowboy's Life Is Good Enough for Me" / "Under the Old Wattle Tree"	14 May 1940	Regal Zonophone	G24027
"The Australian Bushman's Yodel" / "There's an Empty Bunk in the Bunkhouse"	14 May 1940	Regal Zonophone	G24028
"The Shearer's Goodbye" / "Memories of Home"	25 Nov 1940	Regal Zonophone	G24187
"The Newsboy's Message" / "Going Home"	25 Nov 1940	Regal Zonophone	G24221
"The Wandering Gambler" / "Happy Cowboys"	25 Nov 1940	Regal Zonophone	G24326
"Headin' for the Warwick Rodeo" / "Can a Black Sheep Be Forgiven?"	14 Nov 1941	Regal Zonophone	G24382
"The Crepe Upon the Little Cabin Door" / "The Maple on the Hill"	14 Nov 1941	Regal Zonophone	G24409
"When the Candle Lights are Gleaming" / "Let's Grow Old Together"	14 Nov 1941	Regal Zonophone	G24482
"The Dying Soldier's Prayer" / "I'll Be Back Never Fear"	20 Nov 1941	Regal Zonophone	G24506
"The Face On the Bar Room Floor" / "Wingie the Railway Cop"	20 Nov 1941	Regal Zonophone	G24545
"Down By the Old Beaten Trail" / "The Australian Hillbilly"	20 Nov 1941	Regal Zonophone	G24554
"What a Pal My Mother Might Have Been to Me" / "Where the White Faced Cattle Roam"	18 May 1942	Regal Zonophone	G24596
"My Pretty Quadroon" / "Wonder Valley"	18 May 1942	Regal Zonophone	G24632
"Blazin' the Trail" / "A Mother's Plea"	18 May 1942	Regal Zonophone	G24670
"Where the Roly Poly Grass Rolls O'er the Plain" / "Music in My Pony's Feet"	22 Dec 1942	Regal Zonophone	G24822
"Stockmen in Uniform" / "Sunny Australian Sweetheart"	22 Dec 1942	Regal Zonophone	G24851
"Riding Home At Sundown" / "Bushland of My Dreams"	22 Dec 1942	Regal Zonophone	G24883
"Brown Eyed Sweetheart Of Mine" / "The Bushman's Rodeo"	16 March 1945	Regal Zonophone	G24929
"The Drover's Song" / "Where The Lazy Murray River Rolls Along"	16 March 1945	Regal Zonophone	G24947
"Bushland Paradise" / "Rhythm In The Saddle"	16 March 1945	Regal Zonophone	G24963
"The Overlander Trail" / "Over Hill Top And Hollow"	19 Sep 1946	Regal Zonophone	G25052
"Riding Down the Valley" / "The Mountain Barbecue"	19 Sep 1946	Regal Zonophone	G25069
"Chain Lightning the Outlaw" / "The Orphan Boy and His Dog"	19 Sep 1946	Regal Zonophone	G25078
"Down the Old Bush Track" / "Pioneering Days"	25 Mar 1948	Regal Zonophone	G25224
"The Stockman and the Outlaw" / "My Sunny Southern Home"	25 Mar 1948	Regal Zonophone	G25237
"The Chicken Song" / Eureka"	23 Apr 1948	Regal Zonophone	G25218
"Dear Old Aussie Blues" / "Beneath the Queensland Moon"	21 Sep 1950	Regal Zonophone	G25284
"Riding Down the Wallaby Trail" / "Always Call Me Darling"	21 Sep 1950	Regal Zonophone	G25286
"My Darling River Rose" / "Little Jackeroo"	21 Sep 1950	Regal Zonophone	G25287
"Wedding Bells" / "Murrumbidgee Blues"	18 June 1951	Regal Zonophone	G25305
"The Black Sheep" / "Freight Train Blues"	18 June 1951	Regal Zonophone	G25306
"I'm Gonna Tear Down the Mailbox" / "Beyond the Setting Sun"	18 June 1951	Regal Zonophone	G25307
"The Flying Doctor" / "A Mother As Lovely As You"	30 Oct 1951	Regal Zonophone	G25323 45-DO-4047
"There's Another Angel In Heaven" / "Too Many Parties And Too Many Pals"	30 Oct 1951	Regal Zonophone	G25341
"I Can't Stand Sitting in a Cell" / "Gambling Polka Dot Blues"	30 Oct 1951	Regal Zonophone	G25342
"Too Old to Cut The Mustard" / "Back Street Affair"	18 Nov 1952	Regal Zonophone	G25344
"My Mother Must Have Been a Girl Like You" / "I Love You a Thousand Ways"	18 Nov 1952	Regal Zonophone	
"Christmas Bells" / "Dear Old Dorrigo"	18 Nov 1952	Regal Zonophone	G25356
"Somebody's Stolen My Honey" / "Blue Since You've Been Gone"	18 Nov 1952	Regal Zonophone	G25357
"Death of Hank Williams" / "Missing In Action"	3 July 1953	Regal Zonophone	G25368
"Pentridge Jail" / "Spirit of Progress"	3 July 1953	Regal Zonophone	G25383
"I Can't Forget My Memories" / "Swagman's Friend"	3 July 1953	Regal Zonophone	G25391
"The Old Sundowner" / "Australia's Kitty Gill"	3 July 1953	Regal Zonophone	G25392
"Honeymoon on a Rocket Ship" / "The Ring"	2 Oct 1953	Regal Zonophone	G25376
"The Blacksheep's Return to the Fold" / "The Kelly Gang"	2 Oct 1953	Regal Zonophone	G25387
"In Daddy's Footsteps" / "I'd Rather Have a Pony Than a Girl"	2 Oct 1953	Regal Zonophone	
"I've Mortgaged the Farm Again" / "Sailor Boy"	22 June 1955	Regal Zonophone	G25416
"Away Out On the Plain" / "Ben Hall the Bushranger"	22 June 1955	Regal Zonophone	
"Busy Buzzin' Round" / "A Yellow Dog's Love"	22 June 1955	Regal Zonophone	
"There's Sunshine On My Side of the Street" / "She Left Me for the Joys of Gold"	22 June 1955	Regal Zonophone	
"Little Red Bonnet" / "Kings Cross Boogie"	5 Oct 1956	Regal Zonophone	
"Answer to Missing in Action" / "The Ringer"	5 Oct 1956	Regal Zonophone	G25462
"Mareeba Rodeo" / "Poison Darts"	5 Oct 1956	Regal Zonophone	G25463
"Mummy Didn't Tuck Me Into Bed Last Night" / "Lest We Forget"	5 Oct 1956	Regal Zonophone	
"Flynn of the Inland" / "My Dream of Hank and Jimmie"	29 Aug 1958	Regal Zonophone	45-DO-3987
"I'll Stroll Down Memory Lane With You" / "Don't Forget Me Little Darling"	29 Aug 1958	Regal Zonophone	45-DO–3988
"The Prisoner's Song" / "On an Ocean of Broken Dreams"	29 Aug 1958	Regal Zonophone	45-DO-3989
"In the Doghouse" / "Bowlegged Stockman"	29 Aug 1958	Regal Zonophone	45-DO-3990
"Hank, It Will Never Be The Same Without You" / "Aren't I Lucky"	18 Sep 1959	Regal Zonophone	45-DO-4104
"Rocking Alone in an Old Rocking Chair" / "Rhythm of the Roundup"	18 Sep 1959	Regal Zonophone	45-DO-4105
"Polling Day" / "Dave Sands"	18 Sep 1959	Regal Zonophone	45-DO-4106
"Anybody's Lover" / "The Nightmare"	24 March 1960	Regal Zonophone	45-DO-4133
"Christmas Blues" / "What's the Use?"	24 March 1960	Regal Zonophone	45-DO–4134
"The Snowy Mountains" / "Ten Years"	24 March 1960	Regal Zonophone	45-DO-4135
"Under Western Skies" / "When The Cactus Is In Bloom"	22 Sep 1960	Regal Zonophone	45-DO-4160
"The Panther" / "The Spice of Life"	22 Sep 1960	Regal Zonophone	45-DO-4161
"My Sleepy Valley Home" / "Roley"	22 Sep 1960	Regal Zonophone	45-DO-4162
"Mother Went A-Walking" / "Crazy"	1 Dec 1961	Regal Zonophone	DO-4163
"I Went Home to Mother" / "Teardrops"	1 Dec 1961	Regal Zonophone	45-DO-4252
"Journey's End / Gonna Ride Till the Sun Goes Down"	1 Dec 1961	Regal Zonophone	45-DO-4253
"True Friends Are So Few" / "Rockin' Cowboy"	1 Dec 1962	Regal Zonophone	45-DO-4384
"Gonna Ride Till the Sun Goes Down" / "My Sleepy Valley Home" (Recut)	1 Dec 1962	Regal Zonophone	
"Please Light the Darkness for Me" / "I've Forgotten How to Cry"	20 May 1963	Regal Zonophone	45-DO-4381
"Snow On the Mountain" / "Back to Alice Springs"	20 May 1963	Regal Zonophone	45-DO-4383
"When Jesus Calls" / "The Cross of Jesus"	20 May 1963	Regal Zonophone	45-DO-4382
"The Rules of Love" / "Horse Teams"	1979	Regal Zonophone	
"Way Up North" / "Pal Of My Heart"	26 Feb 1964	Regal Zonophone	45-DO-4462
"I'm Moving Out" / "Pretty Girl"	26 Feb 1964	Regal Zonophone	DO-4463
"I've Been Around" / "A Letter to Slim"	26 Feb 1964	Regal Zonophone	DO-4464
"Chapel Bells" / "We're Both Sorry Now"		RCA	101604
"Lofty" / "My Windflower State"		RCA	101682
"Les Dingo" / "Lucky Horseshoe"		RCA	101724
"Wild River" / "This Particular Baby"		RCA	101597
"That Old Gum Tree" / "Black Diamond"		RCA	101605
"The Big Banana Land" / "Who Can Make a Flower"	July 1969	RCA	101855
"The Sounds Of The Bush At Night" / "The Sad Eyed Zebu Steer"		RCA	101857
"Back O' Bourke" / "Spider From The Gwydir"		RCA	102097
"Buddy Williams At the Opera House" / "Mighty Moonbi Range"	1974	RCA	102399
"The Wreck of the Tasman Bridge" / "35 Wonderful Years"		RCA	102748

=== Compilation albums and special releases ===
List of compilation albums and special releases, with selected chart positions
Title	Released	Label	Cat.
Buddy Williams Sings Jimmy Rodgers	1962	EMI	330SX 7665
Buddy Williams Sings Outback Ballads	unknown	EMI	330SX 7644
Buddy Williams "I'll Stroll Down Memory Lane With You"	1978	EMI	EMB.10402
Buddy Williams "Bushland Of My Dreams"	1979	EMI	EMB.10441
Buddy Williams "Blazin' the Trail"	1983	EMI	EMB.10509
Buddy Williams "Over Hilltop and Hollow"	1985	EMI	AX 701217
The Immortal Buddy Williams "Away Out On The Plain"	1987	EMI	AX 701370
Buddy Williams "Under Western Skies"	1991	EMI	8380202
Buddy Williams Regan Zonophone Collection – Vol 1	1997	EMI	
Buddy Williams – Last Outback Entertainer	12 July 2011	Rocket Group Party	

== Awards and nominations ==
=== Australian Roll of Renown ===
The Australian Roll of Renown honours Australian and New Zealander musicians who have shaped the music industry by making a significant and lasting contribution to Country Music. It was inaugurated in 1976 and the inductee is announced at the Country Music Awards of Australia in Tamworth in January.

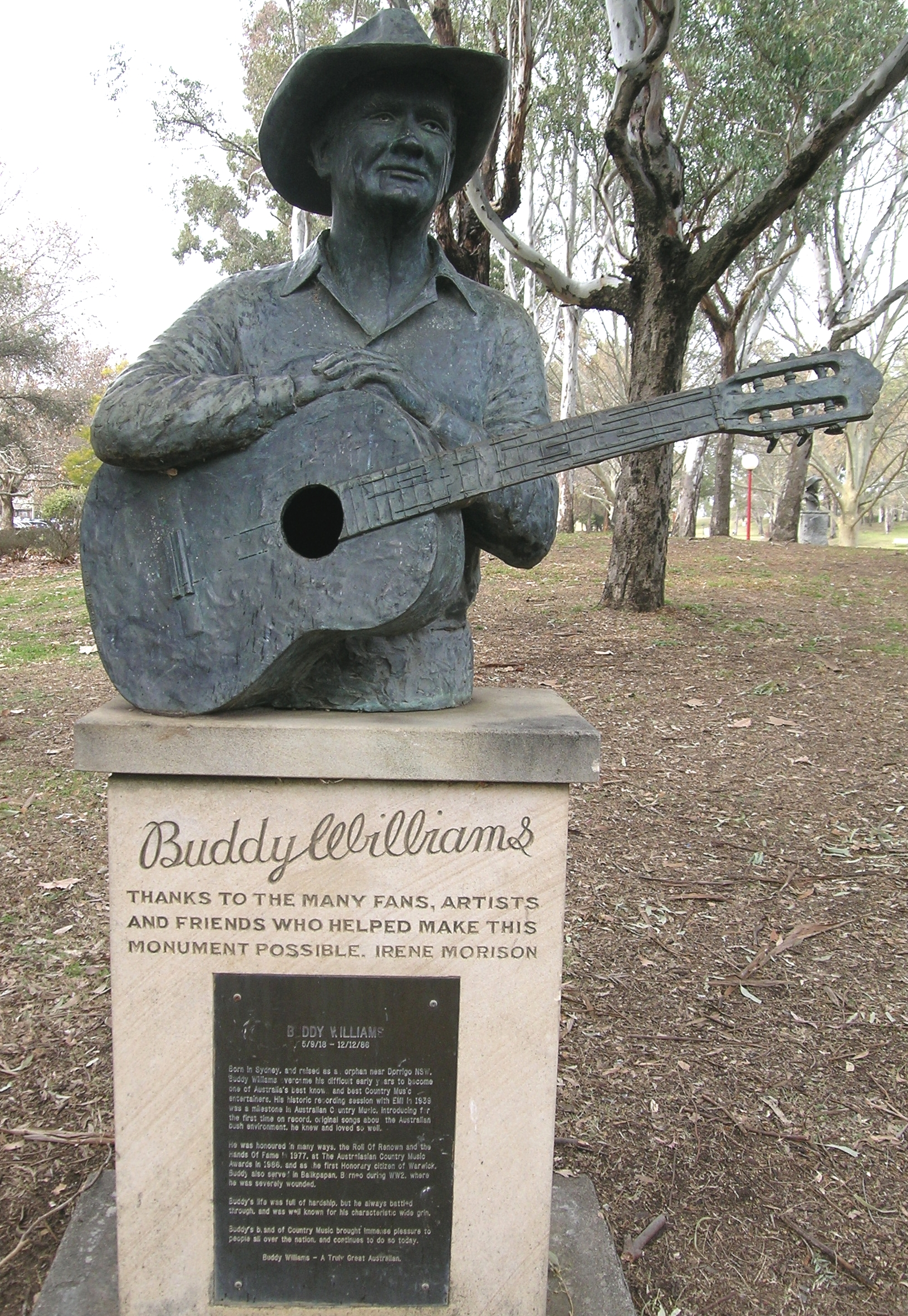
Bust of Buddy Williams in Centennial Park, Tamworth, NSW

Year	Nominee / work	Award	Result
1977	Buddy Williams	Australian Roll of Renown	inductee

=== Country Music Awards of Australia ===
The Country Music Awards of Australia (CMAA) (also known as the Golden Guitar Awards) is an annual awards night held in January during the Tamworth Country Music Festival, celebrating recording excellence in the Australian country music industry. They have been held annually since 1973.

Year	Nominee / work	Award	Result
1980	What a Dreary Old World It Would Be	Heritage Award	Won

=== Tamworth Songwriters Awards ===
The Tamworth Songwriters Association (TSA) is an annual songwriting contest for original country songs, awarded in January at the Tamworth Country Music Festival. They commenced in 1986. Buddy Williams won two awards.

Year	Nominee / work	Award	Result (wins only)
1987	Buddy Williams	Special Award	Won
1993	Buddy Williams	Songmaker Award	awarded

== Publications ==
- Williams, Buddy (1940). The songs of Buddy Williams. Melbourne: Allans.
- Williams, Buddy (1942). Buddy Williams 'The Yodeling Jackaroo' Second album of latest Australian hill billy songs. Melbourne: Allans.
- Williams, Buddy (c. 1947). Buddy Williams 'The Yodeling Jackaroo' Third book of Australian hill billy songs. Melbourne: Allans.
- Williams, Buddy (1948). Buddy Williams 'The Yodeling Jackaroo' 4th Book of Australian Hill Billy Songs. Melbourne: Allans.
- Williams, Buddy (1948). The orphan boy and his dog. Melbourne: Allans.
- Williams, Buddy (1948). When it's apple picking time in Tassie. Melbourne: Allans.
- Williams, Buddy (c. 1950). Buddy Williams' hillbilly album. Southern Music Publishing Co.
- Williams, Buddy (1956). Buddy Williams' hillbilly album. Number 2. Southern Music Publishing Co.
