= Harry Hopkinson =

British music hall performer (1902–1979)

- Torrani in 1934

Background information
- Also known as: Austin Layton, Harry Torrani
- Born: 8 June 1902; North Wingfield, Chesterfield, England, UK
- Died: 4 March 1979 (aged 76)
- Occupations: Music Hall performer, singer, songwriter
- Label: EMI/Regal Zonophone

Harry Hopkinson (8 June 1902 – 4 March 1979), known professionally as Harry Torrani, was a British music hall performer, singer and songwriter who has been credited as one of the world's greatest yodelers. He was billed as the "Yodeling Cowboy from Chesterfield".

== Biography ==
Hopkinson came from a family of coal miners in North Wingfield, Chesterfield, England, and started singing in the North Wingfield Church choir. After a spell working in the local colliery, cut short due to an accident, he entered show business performing with a troupe of traveling entertainers. Initially Hopkinson used the stage name Austin Layton. The yodelling part of Hopkinson's act was expanded, and it was then he adopted the more commercial and continental sounding name Harry Torrani.

Hopkinson recorded his first yodelling song in 1931 for the Regal Zonophone label, "Honeymoon Yodel" coupled with "Happy and Free". His recording career continued for c. 10 years, and he recorded 25 records and 51 tracks. Hopkinson performed extensively on radio and in music halls, and was billed as the "Yodeling Cowboy from Chesterfield". He earned the nickname "The Singing Puzzle" due to his falsetto performances behind a curtain which had audiences guessing at his gender. Hopkinson's yodelling style has been cited as a significant influence on subsequent generations of yodellers worldwide, including Rex Dallas.

Hopkinson was married to wife Joy and had a daughter Dawn, he retired from show business during the late 1940s. In his retirement he worked as a watch repairer, after entering a nursing home and having suffered a stroke he died on 4 March 1979 at the age of 76.

== Discography ==
- "Honeymoon Yodel" / "Happy and Free" (1931)
- "Mississippi Yodel" / "Mammy's Yodel" (1932)
- "Yodel All Day" / "Yodeller's Dream Girl" (1932)
- "Dan, Dan, the Yodelling Man" / "Sitting In a Jail House" (1933)
- "Gambling Darkie" / "Yodelling Rag Man" (1933)
- "Mexican Yodel" / "My Swiss Miss Yodel" (1933)
- "The Yodelling Monster" / "The Yodelling Hobo" (1934)
- "Log Cabin" / "Lancashire Yodelling Lass" (1935)
- "Yodel and Smile" / "My Guitar and Me" (1937)
- "Mockingbird Yodel" / "The Prairie Yodel" (1937)
- "Scottie the Yodeller" / "Nursery Rhyme Yodel" (1938)
