= Mike Quarmby =

Australian singer

- Origin: Adelaide, Australia
- Genres: Country
- Occupation(s): Musician, horticulturalist
- Instrument(s): Vocals, guitar
- Years active: 1970s - 1980s
- Labels: CBS, EMS, Nationwide, RCA Victor

Mike Quarmby is an Australian singer who recorded in Australia from the early 1970s to the late 1980s. He has had albums issued on the CBS, EMS, Nationwide and RCA Victor labels.

== Background ==
According to Country Call, Quarmby was South Australia's leading country singer. His debut single was "The Far Outback" bw "Someday the Sun" that was released on CBS in 1973. He recorded for Graham Morphett's EMS label which was the same label that Lenore Somerset, Veronica Overton, Patsy Biscoe, and Pam Tamblyn had releases on.

In later years he would be involved in horticulture.

== Career ==
=== 1970s ===
In 1973, Quarmby's Visions album was released on CBS SBP 234385. The musicians that played on the album were, Jock Munro on guitars, Sandy Mathewson on bass, Dean Birbeck on drums, Glenn Henrich on piano, tenor sax, clarinet, soprano sax, vibes recorded and percussion, Mike Smith on banjo and fiddle, Trevor Warner on fiddle and dobro and J. Alan Slater on electric piano and organ. It was his debut album. It was reviewed in the November issue of Electronics Australia. The reviewer said that it was a brilliant first album and Quarmby played acoustic guitar very well. The album was recorded on a 16 track recorder in Adelaide by John Widgery and Mike Fitzhenry. The reviewer said that sessions produced a big sound but Quarmby had a rather light voice. The songs singled out were, "Someday the Sun" and "People, People, People", which was one of the two country-styled jams.

In 1977, Quarmby's It’s Nothing You Could Ever Hang a Name On was released on EMS GNLP7057 and Nationwide GNLP7057.

It was reported in the 3 February 1979 issue of Music Week that the directors of EMS Records, John Evans and Graham Morphett and Jean Leskiw the executive vice-president of Maple Haze in Canada had entered into a type of reciprocal arrangement. From the Australian side was "Muddy Mississippi" by Mike Quarmby and "Corroboree Song" by Trev Warner. And from the Canadian side was an album by the Western Senators.

=== 1980s ===
Along with John Chester, Matt Raynor, Reg Lindsay, Trev 'n Dennis and Pam and Lou Tamblyn, Mike Quarmby and Stardust appeared at the Southern Country Music Festival, held at the racecourse at Strathalbyn. They were part of the weekend program of an event that attracted 8,000 people.

In 1981, his single, "Whatever The Moment Requires" bw "Misty Morning" was released on RCA Victor 103831.

On 25 October 1981, Mike Quarmby and his Country band along with the S.A. Police Band were the musical attractions at the 1981 Bushing fair, an event described by the V.H. Times (Victor Harbor Times) as one of the biggest days in the history of McLaren Vale.

On 1 July 1988, Quarmby and his brand of music was set to entertain guests at the Conservatory at the Bel Air Hotel. He had the 7:30 to 11:30 slot. Quarmby was booked to appear at the Conservatory at the Bel Air Hotel on 12 August 1988.

He released a self-titled cassette album in 1989.

=== 1990s ===
According to the Victor Harbor Times, a South Australian vocalist and guitarist had been playing regular gigs at the Currency Creek Winery was appearing with Trevor Warner, Frankie Davidson and Kelly's Revenge! Bush Band at a three-hour country spectacular at the Mount Barker Show on 31 March 1990.

On 5 October 1990, Quarmby was booked to appear at the Rivers End Resort in Goolwa at 7:30 pm.

According to "Lorraine's Roundup" in the November 1991 issue of Country Call, Quarmby had a new cassette out and they were looking forward to having Mike & the Bandicoots back at their November show.

== Later years ==
Quarmby, who has been a horticulturalist for some decades has been working with his wife Gayle in the bush tucker industry. They were the subject of an article published in the Australian Financial Review on 30 May 2017. Since 2001, Quarmby and his wife had been working in a business that would work positively for and give recognition to Indigenous Australia.

== Personal life ==
Mike Quarmby is married to Gayle who is the daughter of landscape artist, Ernest "Rex" Battarbee.

== Discography ==
=== Singles ===
- "The Far Outback" / "Someday the Sun", CBS BA221998 - 1973
- "Whatever The Moment Requires" / "Misty Morning", RCA Victor 103831 - 1981

=== Albums ===
- Visions, CBS SBP-234385 - 1973
- It’s Nothing You Could Ever Hang a Name On, EMS GNLP 7057 - 1977
- Misty Morning, RCA Victor VPL1-6568 - 1981
- Mike Quarmby - 1989
