= Australian Roll of Renown =

Australian country music Award

Australian Country Music Roll of Renown
- Awarded for: Contribution to Country Music
- Country: Australia
- Presented by: Country Music Awards of Australia
- First award: 1976

The Australian Country Music Roll of Renown is an Australian and New Zealand country music Hall of Fame that was inaugurated by Radio 2TM in 1976. The award honours Australian and New Zealand musicians who have shaped the music industry by making a significant and lasting contribution to country music. The award is determined by an independent selection panel, set up under Chairmanship of Max Ellis, one of the original founders of the Roll of Renown, the Awards and the Festival. The inductee is announced at the Country Music Awards of Australia in Tamworth every January.

== List of inductees ==
| Year | Inductees |
|---|---|
| 1976 | Tex Morton |
| 1977 | Buddy Williams |
| 1978 | Smoky Dawson |
| 1979 | Slim Dusty |
| 1980 | Shirley Thoms |
| 1981 | Tim McNamara |
| 1982 | Gordon Parsons |
| 1983 | The McKean Sisters (Joy and Heather) |
| 1984 | Reg Lindsay |
| 1985 | Rick and Thel Carey |
| 1986 | Johnny Ashcroft |
| 1987 | Chad Morgan |
| 1988 | John Minson |
| 1989 | The Hawking Brothers |
| 1990 | Stan Coster |
| 1991 | Barry Thornton |
| 1992 | Nev Nicholls |
| 1993 | Shorty Ranger |
| 1994 | Jimmy Little |
| 1995 | Ted Egan |
| 1996 | Dusty Rankin |
| 1997 | John Williamson |
| 1998 | Rocky Page |
| 1999 | Brian Young |
| 2000 | Rex Dallas |
| 2001 | Arthur Blanch |
| 2002 | The Schneider Sisters (Mary and Rita Schneider) |
| 2003 | Frank Ifield |
| 2004 | Webb Brothers & Kenny Kitching |
| 2005 | The Singing Kettles & Athol McCoy |
| 2006 | Reg Poole |
| 2007 | Lindsay Butler & Kevin King |
| 2008 | Geoff Mack & Jean Stafford |
| 2009 | Slim Newton |
| 2010 | Anne Kirkpatrick |
| 2011 | Phil Emmanuel and Tommy Emmanuel |
| 2012 | Terry Gordon |
| 2013 | Wayne Horsburgh |
| 2014 | Norm Bodkin & Les Parnell |
| 2015 | Ray Kernaghan & Lee Kernaghan |
| 2016 | Graeme Connors |
| 2017 | Troy Cassar-Daley |
| 2018 | Kasey Chambers |
| 2019 | James Blundell |
| 2020 | Joy McKean |
| 2021 | The Bushwackers |
| 2022 | Beccy Cole |
| 2023 | Colin Buchanan |
| 2024 | Allan Caswell |
| 2025 | Keith Urban |
| 2026 | Adam Harvey |
