= Stan Coster =

Australian singer-songwriter (1930–1997)

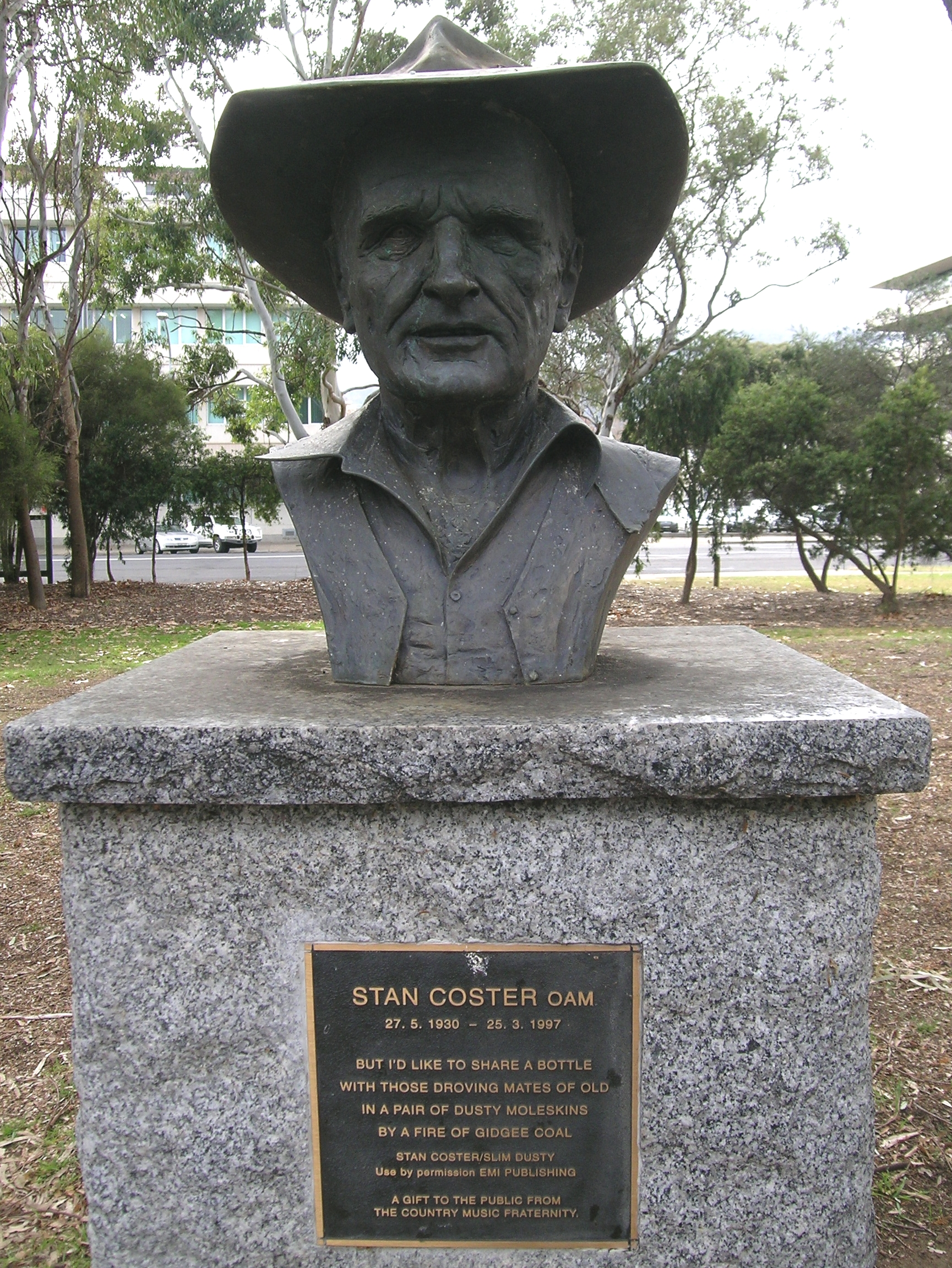
- Bust of Stan Coster, Bicentennial Park, Tamworth, NSW.

Background information
- Genres: Australian country music; rough rider; construction worker; station hand
- Instruments: Vocals, guitar
- Years active: 1956–1996
- Label: Gidgee Records
- Formerly of: Slim Dusty

Stan Coster OAM (27 May 1930 – 25 March 1997) was an Australian country music singer-songwriter. His songs were regularly performed by Slim Dusty and other singers. He is the father of country music singer Tracy Coster.

== Early life ==
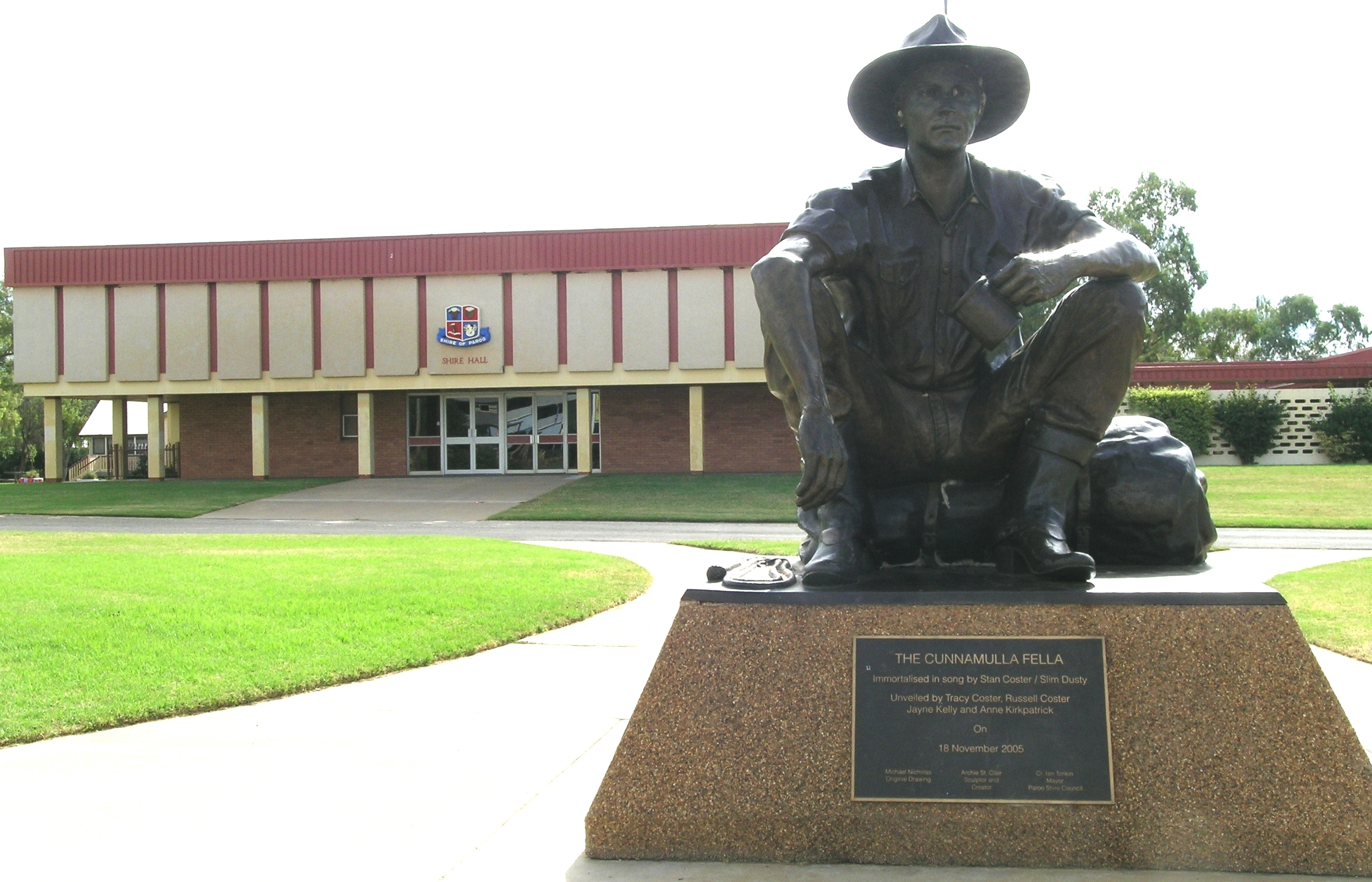
Statue of the "Cunnamulla Fella" erected as a tribute to songwriter Stan Coster and singer Slim Dusty. The Shire of Paroo hall in Cunnamulla (which was later rebuilt after this photo was taken in 2010) is in the background.

Stan Coster was born at Casino on the north coast of New South Wales, Australia in 1930. One of seven children, each of whom were musically talented. He left school at the age of 14 and worked for a local butcher in Woolgoolga, NSW. By the age of 16, he was cutting sleepers for train tracks and at 18 years of age he went to work as a station hand before moving to Sydney and in 1948 moved to Cooma, New South Wales, to work on the Snowy Mountains Scheme.

In 1950, at age 20, Coster joined a travelling rodeo as a rough rider and in 1951 he married Dorothy Aileen Milto, with whom he had three children, including country music singer Tracy Coster.

== Musical career ==
In 1956, Coster began writing songs and met Slim Dusty in 1960 at Longreach, Queensland. Dusty recorded his first Coster song, "Return of the Stockman" in 1962. Dusty went on to record another 70 of Stan Coster's tracks. In 1977, Coster won the Golden Guitar for APRA Song of the Year with his composition "Three Rivers Hotel", recorded by Slim Dusty. While on the land Coster worked as a ringer, fencer, slaughterman, horse-breaker, kangaroo shooter, and shed hand and was able to draw these experiences into his bush ballads. Popular compositions such as his "Three Rivers Hotel", which tells the story of building a train line into a remote nickel mine, were based on his own life experiences and brought to popular attention through performances and recordings by Slim Dusty and other artists.

In the late 1970s, Coster moved to Tamworth, New South Wales where he had begun his singing career at Joe Maguire's Pub (formerly known as the Tattersalls Hotel), and then to nearby Manilla. He appeared in the 1984 feature film The Slim Dusty Movie and in that year formed his own record label, "Gidgee Records".

In the 1980s Coster held his Stan Coster Show at the Tenthill Hotel in Upper Tenthill, Queensland to crowds too large to be accommodated in the hotel.

In 1987, Coster won another Golden Guitar for APRA Song of the Year for "He's a Good Bloke When He's Sober". In 1989 he was awarded an OAM for "Services to Country Music", and in 1990 was inducted into the Australian Roll of Renown at Tamworth. He won the 1995 Golden Guitar (Heritage Award) for Bush Ballad Song of the Year with "Lawson's Loaded Dog" and in 1996 released his last album Come Back to the Bush.

Other than Dusty – Buddy Williams, Joy McKean, John Williamson, Gordon Parsons and many other music artists have performed Stan Coster songs.

== Death ==
Coster died from cancer on 25 March 1997 at Manilla.

== Legacy and awards ==
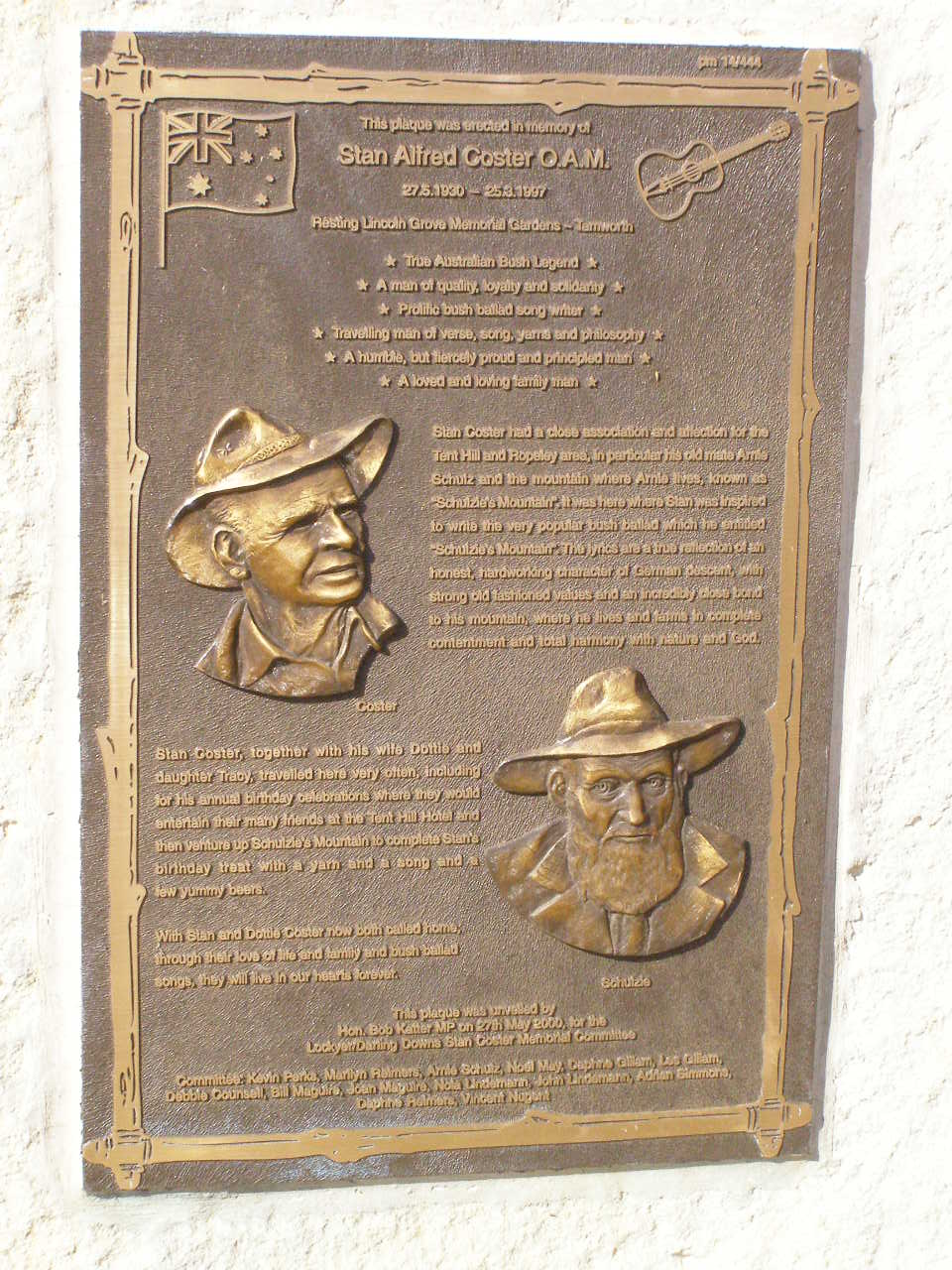
Stan Coster memorial, carpark of the Tenthill Hotel, 2006

In 1999, a bronze bust featuring his image was unveiled in Tamworth's Bicentennial Park (31.0931°S 150.9291°E). On Sunday 18 January 1998, another memorial was erected in Manilla (30.7477°S 150.7202°E).

Two memorials were erected in Queensland. On Tuesday 4 April 2000, a memorial was erected at Centenary Park, Mowen Street, Clifton (27.9322°S 151.9053°E). On Saturday 27 May 2000, another memorial was unveiled by Bob Katter at the Tenthill Hotel Carpark in Upper Tenthill (27.6344°S 152.2142°E).

Coster's daughter, Tracy Coster released a tribute album to her father in 2004, entitled "Coster Country" which also featured duet performances with John Williamson, Adam Harvey, Lee Kernaghan and Anne Kirkpatrick.

In 2005, in tribute to the iconic song "Cunnamulla Fella" performed by Dusty with lyrics by Stan Coster, an eponymous statue was unveiled in the Queensland town of Cunnamulla. The song recalls Coster's days working as a sheep-shearing "ringer" around Cunnamulla in the 1950s. Dusty recorded the song and it became an enduring country music hit, later covered by Lee Kernaghan. The statue was unveiled by country music personalities Anne Kirkpatrick (Dusty's daughter), Jayne Kelly and Tracy and Russell Coster.

The Annual Tenthill Turnout is held at Ma Ma Creek in May on the Saturday closest to Coster's birthday, 27 May, to celebrate Coster's music.

=== Australian Roll of Renown ===
The Australian Roll of Renown honours Australian and New Zealander musicians who have shaped the music industry by making a significant and lasting contribution to Country Music. It was inaugurated in 1976 and the inductee is announced at the Country Music Awards of Australia in Tamworth in January.

Year	Nominee / work	Award	Result
1990	Stan Coster	Australian Roll of Renown	inductee

=== Country Music Awards of Australia ===
The Country Music Awards of Australia (CMAA) (also known as the Golden Guitar Awards) is an annual awards night held in January during the Tamworth Country Music Festival, celebrating recording excellence in the Australian country music industry. They have been held annually since 1973.

Year	Nominee / work	Award	Result (wins only)
1977	"Three Rivers Hotel" (written by Stan Coster) recorded by Slim Dusty	APRA Song of the Year	Won
1987	"He's a Good Bloke When He's Sober" (written by Stan Coster) recorded by Slim Dusty	APRA Song of the Year	Won
1995	"Lawson's Loaded Dog" (written by Stan Coster)	Bush Ballad Heritage Song of the Year	Won

=== Tamworth Songwriters Awards ===
The Tamworth Songwriters Association (TSA) is an annual songwriting contest for original country songs, awarded in January at the Tamworth Country Music Festival. They commenced in 1986. Stan Coster has won one award.

Year	Nominee / work	Award	Result (wins only)
2003	"The Ghost of Three Rivers" by Keith Jamieson and Stan Coster	Traditional Bush Ballad of the Year	Won
