= Kelly Dixon =

American archaeologist

Academic background
- Education: University of Minnesota Duluth (BA); Michigan Technological University (MS); University of Nevada, Reno (PhD)
- Thesis: “A place of recreation of our own”: The archaeology of the Boston Saloon. Diversity and leisure in an African American-owned saloon, Virginia City, Nevada (2002)
- Doctoral advisor: Donald L. Hardesty

Academic work
- Discipline: Archaeologist
- Sub-discipline: Archaeology of the American West
- Institutions: University of Montana

Kelly J. Dixon is a Professor of Archaeology at the University of Montana. Her main area of work is the American West, and she is perhaps best known for her work with the Donner Party site at Alder Creek, as well as research into saloons in Virginia City, Nevada.

== Education ==
Kelly Dixon attended the University of Minnesota Duluth, majoring in anthropology. She went on to receive her Master of Science in Industrial Archaeology at Michigan Technological University in 1995 and her Doctorate in Anthropology at the University of Nevada, Reno. While at the University of Nevada she worked on her dissertation based on the archaeology of an African American saloon with Donald Hardesty.

== Research ==
Dixon's particular field of interest is the historical archaeology of the American West. Between 1997 and 2002 she conducted projects in Virginia City, Nevada and the Comstock Mining District while working for the Nevada State Historic Preservation Office at the Comstock Archaeology Center.

Dixon has also done extensive work on the Donner Party site, continuing the work done by Hardesty in the late 1980s and early 1990s. In 2003, in conjunction with researchers from the University of Oregon, a production company affiliated with the Discovery Channel sponsored work there. This resulted in the show Unsolved History: The Donner Party. Her team found numerous artifacts including ceramics, pieces of a lantern, writing slate, mirror fragments, glass from a medicine bottle, and musket balls. She returned in the summer of 2004 for five weeks to carry out an excavation with her colleagues that was funded by various universities, a local foundation, and eventually, for part of the lab analysis, a production company affiliated with the History Channel. Dixon and colleagues were not just concerned with the topic of cannibalism and whether it may have occurred at the Donner Party's Alder Creek camp, but what the individuals living in that camp endured and what, in general, humans do, or how they adapt, when faced with desperate circumstances. The combined historical and archaeological evidence indicated that cannibalism did take place but not until the last few weeks. The History Channel aired the thirty-minute segment on the Donner Party in the spring of 2006 as part of a documentary on cannibalism.

From 2006 to 2008, she served as the editor for the Society for Historical Archaeology website.

== Publications ==
- Boomtown Saloons: Archaeology and History in Virginia City, University of Nevada Press, 2005. (ISBN 0874176085)
- An Archaeology of Desperation: Exploring the Donner Party's Alder Creek Camp, 2011 ISBN 978-0-8061-4210-4
