= Tex Morton =

New Zealand entertainer, songwriter, actor, and hypnotist (1916–1983)

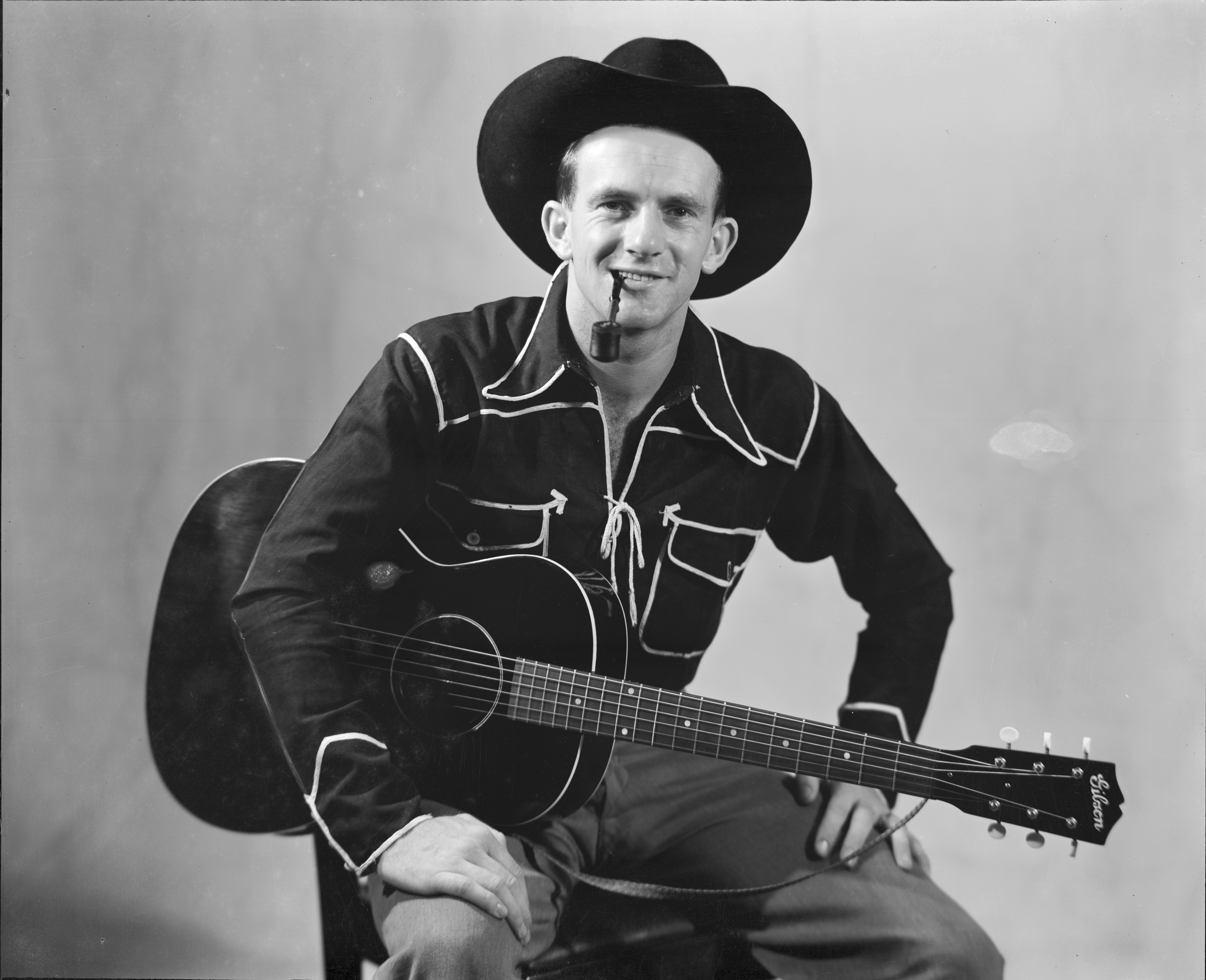
- Tex Morton c. 1940

Background information
- Also known as: Robert Tex Morton
- Born: Robert William Lane; 30 August 1916; Nelson, New Zealand
- Died: July 23, 1983 (aged 66) Royal North Shore Hospital, Sydney, Australia
- Genres: Country
- Occupation: Singer-songwriter
- Instruments: Vocals, guitar
- Years active: 1936–1983
- Labels: Regal Zonophone, Columbia Records, Rodeo Records, Tasman Recording Corp.

Tex Morton (born Robert William Lane in Nelson, New Zealand, also credited as Robert Tex Morton; 30 August 1916 – 23 July 1983 Sydney, Australia) was a New Zealand singer-songwriter and musician, who was a pioneer in Australian of country and western music and referred to as "The Father of Australian Country Music" being the first artist to record this style outside the United States . He also performed as a vaudevillian, actor, television host, travelling performer and circus performer.

== Early life ==
Morton was born Robert William Lane in 1916, the eldest of four to Bernard William Lane and Mildred Eastgate. At age 15 he left home to launch himself into show business. He adopted the name Morton while busking, after a police officer asked whether he was Bobby Lane, and he answered that he was Bobby Morton, taking the name from a sign seen on a garage.

== Career ==
=== 1930s – 1940s ===
Morton recorded some "hillbilly songs" in 1934 in his native New Zealand in Wellington those however where not commercially issued Soon after, he emigrated to Australia, apparently intent on a recording career. On 25 February 1936, Morton made his first professional recordings cutting four songs for the Columbia Graphophone Company in Sydney. and between 1936 and 1943, recorded 93 songs, accompanying himself on an acoustic guitar for most tracks, for Columbia's Regal Zonophone label. On some later tracks, he was accompanied by his band, The Rough Riders, and a female singer 'Sister Dorrie' (Dorothy Carroll). In 1943, he left Columbia following a dispute with Arch Kerr, the Record Sales Manager. He was often billed as 'The Yodelling Boundary Rider' on records, though he apparently did not approve of the name.

During the 1930s and 1940s, Morton gradually incorporated Australian themes and motifs into some of the songs he wrote. This approach was followed by other Australian country artists who followed in his footsteps, such as Buddy Williams and Slim Dusty, leading to a particular genre of country music - the Australian bush ballad, which was also influenced by the turn-of-the-century poetry of Banjo Paterson and Henry Lawson.

=== 1950s – 1980s ===
From 1950 to 1959, Morton was based in North America. He toured with Pee Wee King in 1952 and recorded in Nashville in March 1953. Morton toured Canada and the United States as a stage hypnotist, memory expert, whip cracker, and sharpshooter, and was associated for some time with the Canadian country singer, Dixie Bill Hilton.

He returned to Australia in 1959 with a Grand Ole Opry show, featuring Roy Acuff, the Wilburn Brothers and June Webb, but the show was not popular with Australian audiences and the tour had to be called off.

Morton continued to record during the 1960s and 1970s, and had a surprise hit with "Goondiwindi Grey" on the Australian Singles Charts, reaching No. 5 in June 1973. During this period, Morton showed an increasing interest in acting, hosting the Country Touch TV series in New Zealand, and in the 1980s appeared in Australian films Stir (1980), We of the Never Never (1982) and Goodbye Paradise (1983).

Morton was the first inductee into Australian Roll of Renown in 1976, recognising his pivotal role in the development of country music in Australia and New Zealand. He was inducted into the Country Music Awards of Australia Hands of Fame in 1977.

== Later years ==
He had married Marjorie Brisbane in 1937, and they had two sons, twins. Morton and Brisbane divorced in 1979, and he lived with his partner Kathleen Bryan until his death on 23 July 1983 in Sydney. Morton died of cancer and was survived by Bryan and one son.

His song 'Wrap Me Up with My Stockwhip and Blanket' (1936) was added to the National Film and Sound Archive's Sounds of Australia registry in 2010.

== Style ==
Morton, in his career, capitalized on American cowboy and "Wild West" images, and was sometimes billed as "The Singing Cowboy Sensation," performing for rodeos, and singing in a yodeling style that drew heavily on those of American singers such as Jimmie Rodgers. His yodelling was influenced by Rodgers, Goebel Reeves and the British Alpine yodeller, Harry Torrani.

His early recordings featured references to America, until the release of 'Wrap Me Up with My Stockwhip and Blanket' in 1936 where he added references to dingoes and the coolibah, Australianisms that were at odds with his American style singing accent.

== Awards and nominations ==
=== Country Music Awards of Australia ===
The Country Music Awards of Australia (CMAA) (also known as the Golden Guitar Awards) is an annual awards night held in January during the Tamworth Country Music Festival, celebrating recording excellence in the Australian country music industry. They have been held annually since 1973.

Year	Nominee / work	Award	Result (wins only)	Ref.
1974	"Goondiwindi Grey"	APRA Song of the Year	Won	
1976	Tex Morton	Australian Roll of Renown	inductee	

== Filmography ==
=== Film ===
Year	Title	Role	Notes
1979	Say You Want Me		TV movie (as Robert Morton)
1980	Stir	The Governor	Film (as Robert 'Tex' Morton)
1982	We of the Never Never	Landlord	Feature film
1983	Goodbye Paradise	Godfrey	Feature film (as Robert 'Tex' Morton), (final film role)

=== Television ===
Year	Title	Role	Notes
1975	Homicide	Mr. Watson	TV series, episode: "The Egotist"
1975–1976	Matlock Police	Horrie Day / Prad Smith	TV series, 3 episodes
1977	Glenview High	Grant	TV series, episode: "The Cheat"
1978	Case for the Defence	Rupe Case	TV series, 5 episodes (as Robert 'Tex' Morton)
1983	Waterloo Station	Harry McDowell	TV series (as Robert 'Tex' Morton)
