= The Bragg UNSW Press Prize for Science Writing =

Australian science writing award

The Bragg UNSW Press Prize for Science Writing was established in 2012 to recognise excellence in Australian science writing. The annual prize of A$7,000 is awarded to the best short non-fiction piece of science fiction with the aim of a general audience. Two runners up are awarded $1,500 each.

The prize is named in honour of Australia's first Nobel laureates, father and son team William Henry Bragg and Lawrence Bragg. The prize is supported by the Copyright Agency Cultural Fund and the UNSW Faculty of Science.

An associated anthology, The Best Australian Science Writing (NewSouth Publishing) collects the best of the year's science writing.

== Winners ==
| Year | Author | Work | Source | Result | Ref. |
|---|---|---|---|---|---|
| 2012 | Jo Chandler | Feeling the Heat (excerpt) | Melbourne University Publishing | Winner | |
| 2012 | Ashley Hay | "The Aussie Mozzie Posse" | Good Weekend | Runner Up | |
| 2012 | Peter McAllister | "The Evolution of the Inadequate Modern Male" | Australasian Science | Runner Up | |
| 2013 | Fred Watson | "Here Come the Ubernerds: Planets, Pluto and Prague" | Star-Craving Mad: Tales from a Travelling Astronomer | Winner | |
| 2013 | Gina Perry | "Beyond the Shock Machine" | Behind the Shock Machine: The Untold Story of the Notorious Milgram Psychology Experiments | Runner Up | |
| 2013 | Chris Turney | "Martyrs to Gondwanaland: The Cost of Scientific Exploration" | 1912: The Year the World Discovered Antarctica | Runner Up | |
| 2014 | Jo Chandler | "Tb and Me: A Medical Souvenir" | The Global Mail | Winner | |
| 2014 | Frank Bowden | "Eleven Grams of Trouble" | Inside Story | Runner Up | |
| 2014 | Peter Meredith | "Weathering the Storm" | Australian Geographic | Runner Up | |
| 2015 | Christine Kenneally | "The Past May Not Make You Feel Better" | The Invisible History of the Human Race | Winner | |
| 2015 | Idan Ben-Barak | "Why Aren't We Dead Yet" | Why Aren't We Dead Yet | Runner Up | |
| 2015 | Trent Dalton | "Beating the Odds" | The Weekend Australian | Runner Up | |
| 2016 | Ashley Hay | "The Forest at the Edge of Time" | The Australian Book Review | Winner | |
| 2016 | Susan Double | "Beautiful Contrivances" | Orchids Australia | Runner Up | |
| 2016 | Fiona McMillan | "Lucy's Lullaby: Song for the Ages" | The Australian Book Review | Runner Up | |
| 2017 | Alice Gordon | "Trace Fossils: The Silence of Ediacara, the Shadow of Uranium" | Griffith Review No. 55 – State of Hope | Winner | |
| 2017 | Jo Chandler | "Grave Barrier Reef" | The Australian | Runner Up | |
| 2017 | Elmo Keep | "The Pyramid at the End of the World" | The Australian | Runner Up | |
| 2018 | Andrew Leigh | "From Bloodletting to Placebo Surgery" | Randomistas: How Radical Researchers Changed Our World | Winner | |
| 2018 | Jo Chandler | "Amid Fear and Guns, Polio Finds a Refuge" | Undark | Runner Up | |
| 2018 | Margaret Wertheim | "Radical Dimensions" | Aeon | Runner Up | |
| 2019 | Melissa Fyfe | "Getting Cliterate" | Good Weekend | Winner | |
| 2019 | Cameron Muir | "Ghost Species and Shadow Places" | Griffith Review | Runner Up | |
| 2019 | Jackson Ryan | "How Crispr Could Save Six Billion Chickens from the Meat Grinder" | CNET | Runner Up | |
| 2020 | Ceridwen Dovey | "True Grit" | Wired | Winner | |
| 2020 | Sarah Waples | "Winging It" | The Weekend Australian Magazine | Runner Up | |
| 2020 | Kirsten Weir | "The Year I Broke My Brain" | New Scientist | Runner Up | |
| 2021 | Kirsten Weir | "Covid-19 in Schools: The Perfect Storm" | Scientific American | Winner | |
| 2021 | Ben Oliver | "The Covid Lab Leak Theory" | Wired | Runner Up | |
| 2021 | Anna Funder | "In Praise of the Liberal Arts" | The Guardian | Runner Up | |
| 2021 | Ceridwen Dovey | "Everlasting Free Fall" | Alexander (app) | Winner | |
| 2021 | Jo Chandler | "The Covid-climate Collision" | Unspecified | Runner-up | |
| 2021 | Jackson Ryan | "To the Dragon Palace and Back" | Unspecified | Runner-up | |
| 2022 | Lauren Fuge | "Time Travel and Tipping Points" | Cosmos Magazine | Winner | |
| 2022 | Olivia Willis | "Spillover in Suburbia" | Unspecified | Runner-up | |
| 2022 | Helen Sullivan | "A Syrian Seed Bank's Fight to Survive" | Unspecified | Runner-up | |
| 2023 | Nicky Phillips | "Trials of the Heart" | Nature | Winner | |
| 2023 | Jo Chandler | "Buried Treasure" | Unspecified | Runner-up | |
| 2023 | Amalyah Hart | "Model or Monster" | Unspecified | Runner-up | |
| 2024 | Cameron Stewart | "Heroes of Zero" | The Weekend Australian | Winner | |
| 2024 | Dyani Lewis | "The World's Oldest Story Is Flaking Away. Can Scientists Protect It?" | Unspecified | Runner-up | |
| 2024 | Amanda Niehaus | "Dog People" | Unspecified | Runner-up | |
| 2025 | Tabitha Carvan | "The Unexpected Poetry of PhD Acknowledgements" | Unspecified | Winner | |
| 2025 | Angus Dalton | "The Night I Accidentally Became a Corpse Flower's Bedside Manservant" | Unspecified | Runner-up | |
| 2025 | James Purtill | "Air Conditioning Quietly Changed Australian Life in Just a Few Decades" | Unspecified | Runner-up | |
| 2026 | James Bradley | "An Oceanic Tempo" | Aeon | Winner | |
| 2026 | Jonathan Webb & Fiona Pepper | "Challenger: The Disaster Five People Saw Coming" | ABC News | Winner | |
| 2026 | Kate Evans | "Silent Spring" | | Runner-up | |
| 2026 | Caitlin Maling | "Stromatolites. So What Now?!" | | Runner-up | |
