= Australia 2020 Summit =

Summit held in Australia in 2008

The Australia 2020 Summit was a summit that was held from 18 to 19 April 2008 at Parliament House in Canberra, Australia and aimed to "help shape a long-term strategy for the nation's future". Announced by the new prime minister Kevin Rudd, the summit drew limited bipartisan support from Brendan Nelson and the opposition Coalition parties and ran as 10 working groups of 100 participants. There were 1002 delegates in attendance to discuss ten "critical areas". Ideas and proposals were invited from all members of the community and an official website was set up to accept submissions.

The 10 critical policy areas were:

1. Productivity—including education, skills, training, science and innovation
2. Economy—including infrastructure and the digital economy
3. Sustainability and climate change
4. Rural Australia—focusing on industries and communities
5. Health and ageing
6. Communities and families
7. Indigenous Australia
8. Creative Australia—the arts, film and design
9. Australian governance, democracy and citizenship
10. Security and prosperity—including foreign affairs and trade

== Criticism ==
The summit was criticised by Australia's Jewish community for being scheduled over the first two nights of Passover, which prevented many Jews from attending. The Government responded by convening a special half-day symposium in Sydney five days beforehand, attended by 56 leaders of the Jewish community, plus senior Government representatives Kevin Rudd, Peter Garrett, Nicola Roxon and Jenny Macklin.

The summit was also criticized for the near-absence of women on the 11-member committee who would pick the 1,000 delegates—only actress Cate Blanchett had been named. The Government responded by saying six of the co-chairs would be female politicians. By the time of the summit, there were three women on a 12-member committee. Additionally, other commentators such as the Institute of Public Affairs, Australians for Constitutional Monarchy and Australian Monarchist League criticised what they saw as the unrepresentative nature of the delegates, which in their view biased the final report towards republicanism and ideas such as constitutional reform and a bill of rights.

Some of the delegates themselves expressed criticism of how the summit was conducted. In particular, claims were made that the final report, which purported to represent the resolutions of the sub-groups, did not reflect ideas that they had espoused or did include ideas which they had not discussed, possibly reflecting an agenda which had been determined before the summit. Others were concerned that hard issues, such as terrorism in the group examining foreign affairs and security issues, were ignored.

Journalist Nicholas Stuart was initially struck by the people who were not invited to Australia 2020, including two Australian National University professors Paul Dibb and Hugh White who had both advised Kim Beazley. Looking at the list of those invited, he found that "the holes kept expanding as I looked further and further, searching for the others who should have been there." He said "it began to appear as if one group of advisors ... under Howard had been replaced with another group of similarly hand-picked individuals," plus some media names. There was no continuing secretariat for any follow-up action for the recommendations from the conference or the ten subgroups or forums. Wayne Swan managed to get a review of the taxation system, to be prepared by the Treasury, but in May 2010 when Rudd eventually released the report, he rejected 135 of the 138 recommendations . Stuart wrote "The 2020 summit provided a paradigm for much of the activity in Rudd's term of office ... His rhetoric inspired and enthused voters. And yet ... and yet ... nothing happened."

== Participants ==
The summit was led by an 11-member steering committee, whose initial membership was announced on 26 February 2008. The committee played a key role in selecting the other participants, and each member led one of the working groups together with a government co-chair. Since the initial announcement, Dr Kelvin Kong (Indigenous Australia) withdrew due to family health reasons, and Dr Jackie Huggins was appointed to replace him. On 14 April 2008, an additional co-chair, Dr Julianne Schultz, was announced for the Creative Australia stream.

There were two additional late participants who had been granted special entry as winners of competitions and their names did not show in the original lists of participants. They both attended the Productivity Stream Agenda. Their names were Susan Roberts, TAFE Head Teacher of Child & Family Services from Taree who had won a national competition by Channel Nine and Ernie Peralta, a university lecturer whose "Golden Guru" concept of business mentoring was later adopted in Queensland.

The members of the steering committee were as follows:

Working group (stream)	Committee member	Government co-chair
Chair	Glyn Davis	N/A
Productivity	Warwick Smith	Julia Gillard
Economy	David Morgan	Wayne Swan
Sustainability and Climate Change	Roger Beale	Penny Wong
Rural Australia	Tim Fischer	Tony Burke
Health	Michael Good	Nicola Roxon
Communities and Families	Tim Costello	Tanya Plibersek
Indigenous Australia	Jackie Huggins (replaced Kelvin Kong)	Jenny Macklin
Creative Australia	Cate Blanchett and Julianne Schultz	Peter Garrett
Australian Governance	John Hartigan	Maxine McKew
Security and Prosperity	Michael Wesley	Stephen Smith

=== Australia 2020 Summit Youth Delegates ===
Eleven young people were also selected by their peers at the 2020 Youth Summit, running from 11 to 13 April 2008, to represent Australian youth at the Australia 2020 Summit.

== Related events ==
Several events were held in the lead up to the Australia 2020 Summit:

- 2020 Youth Summit: For 100 young people (15 to 24 years) from around Australia in Canberra, 12 and 13 April 2008.
- Canberra 2020 Summit: For Canberra residents, on the theme of innovation, in Canberra, 5 April 2008.
- Foundations of Open: Technology and Digital Knowledge: Australian National University, Canberra, 3 April 2008.
