= Fran Molloy =

Founder of the Freeline forum for independent journalists in Australia

- Occupations: Journalist, author, academic

Fran Molloy is an Australian journalist and author, journalism academic and founder of the Freeline forum for independent journalists in Australia. She is also an elected member of the Federal Council of the Media, Entertainment and Arts Alliance. Her work has appeared in such newspapers as The Sydney Morning Herald, The Age and The Sun-Herald as well as a range of magazines including Fast Thinking, The Walkley Magazine published by the Walkley Awards, G Magazine, Practical Parenting published by Pacific Magazines.

She also writes for major online publications including the Australian Broadcasting Corporation and SBS. She was also a food reviewer for regular Sydney restaurant guides such as Eating out with Kids, the Good Pub Guide and Cheap Eats Sydney.

She previously wrote blogs for a wide readership for Practical Parenting and Fadgetry, an online gadget guide. In 2007, Molloy was commended by mental health advocacy Stigmawatch for balanced reporting on mental health issues.

As well as hundreds of articles, Molloy has written the books Careers in Journalism (2004) (with Helena Janson) and Extreme: jobs your mother doesn't want you to know about (2006). A former magazine editor and radio producer, Molloy was previously manager of the Australian Centre for Independent Journalism and also taught at the University of Technology. She regularly comments publicly on issues related to freelance journalism and is an adjunct journalism teacher at the University of Technology Sydney, New South Wales Writers' Centre, Southern Cross University Lismore and New York University's Sydney campus.

Molloy was educated at the University of Sydney and De La Salle College, Cronulla and lives in the Sutherland Shire with her husband Brendan FitzPatrick and four children.

== Bibliography ==
- Careers in Journalism, John Wiley and Sons, Sydney, 2004, ISBN 0-7314-0112-3
- Extreme : jobs your mother doesn't want you to know about , CareerFAQ, Ultimo, 2006, ISBN 978-1-921106-28-6
