= Ashley Hay (writer) =

Australian writer

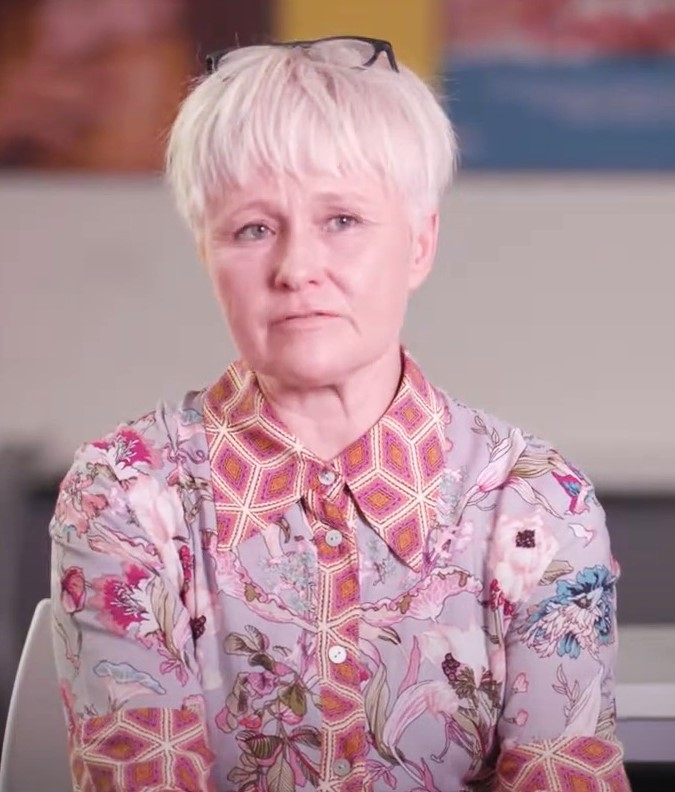
- Hay appears for Griffith Review in 2019
- Born: 1971 (age 54–55)
- Occupation: Novelist; science writer; editor
- Notable awards: Colin Roderick Award; The Bragg UNSW Press Prize for Science Writing

Website
- www.ashleyhay.com.au

Ashley Hay (born 1971) is an Australian writer. She has won awards for both her nonfiction science writing and her novels. From 2018 to 2022 she was editor of the Griffith Review.

== Career ==
Hay is the author of three novels, including The Railwayman's Wife, joint winner of the 2013 Colin Roderick Award and the 2014 People's Choice Award at the New South Wales Premier's Literary Awards.

She won The Bragg UNSW Press Prize for Science Writing in 2016 for her essay "A Forest at the Edge of Time", having previously been a runner-up to Jo Chandler for the inaugural award in 2012.

Hay was appointed editor of the Griffith Review in 2018, while founding editor Julianne Schultz took on the publisher's role. She left in 2022.

Hay's essays and reviews have been published in journals such as The Adelaide Review, Australian Book Review, The Bulletin, Griffith Review, The Independent Monthly, Island, Southerly and Sydney Pen Magazine, as well as in The Sydney Morning Herald and The Australian newspapers.

== Works ==
=== Novels ===
- Hay, Ashley (2010). The body in the clouds. Allen & Unwin. ISBN 978-1-74237-242-6.
- Hay, Ashley (2013). The railwayman's wife. Allen & Unwin. ISBN 978-1-74343-281-5.
- Hay, Ashley (2017). A hundred small lessons : a novel. Allen & Unwin. ISBN 978-1-925576-66-5.

=== Nonfiction ===
- Hay, Ashley (2000). The secret : the strange marriage of Annabella Milbanke and Lord Byron. Duffy & Snellgrove. ISBN 978-1-875989-59-1.
- Hay, Ashley (2002). Gum. Duffy & Snellgrove. ISBN 978-1-876631-26-0.
- Stacey, Robyn; Hay, Ashley (2004). Herbarium. Cambridge University Press. ISBN 978-0-521-60392-8.
- Stacey, Robyn; Hay, Ashley (2007). Museum : the Macleays, their collections and the search for order. Cambridge University Press. ISBN 978-0-521-87453-3.
- Hay, Ashley, ed. (2014). The best Australian science writing 2014. NewSouth Publishing. ISBN 978-1-74224-188-3.
