= Dane Lovett =

Dane Lovett (born 1984) is an artist from Brisbane, Australia. In 2007 the artist moved to Melbourne to complete honours in painting at the Victorian College of the Arts.

== Exhibitions ==
In 2011 Dane Lovett was included in the group show "Explaining Colours to the Blind" at Tristian Koenig, exhibited solo at Colette in Paris and received a grant from the Australia Council for the Arts to undertake a studio residency in Tokyo for three months.

== Representation ==
Dane Lovett is represented by Tristian Koenig in Melbourne and Sullivan + Strumpf Fine Art in Sydney.

== See also ==
- Arts in Australia
