= Jo Chandler =

Australian science writer

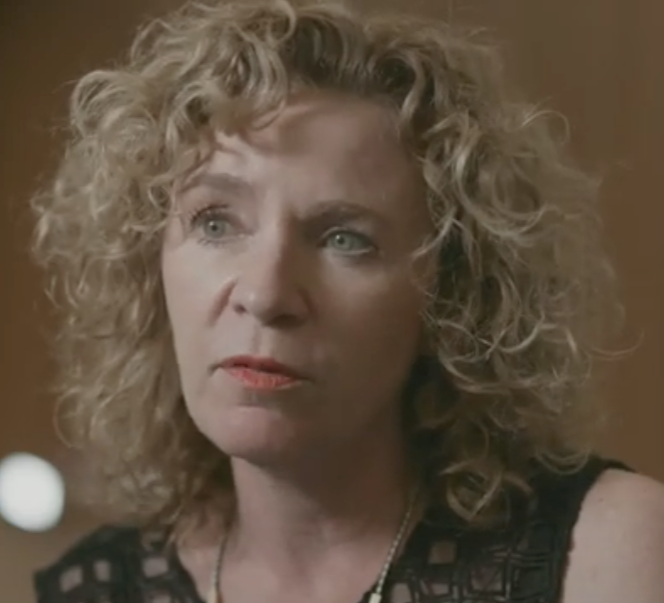
- In a Lowy Institute video in 2018
- Born: 1965 (age 60–61)
- Occupations: Journalist, educator

Jo Chandler (born 1965) is an Australian journalist, science writer and educator. Her journalism has covered a wide range of subject areas, including science, the environment, women's and children's issues, and included assignments in Africa, the Australian outback, Antarctica, Afghanistan and Papua New Guinea. She is currently a lecturer at the University of Melbourne's Centre for Advancing Journalism and Honorary Fellow Deakin University in Victoria, Australia.

Chandler edited Best Australian Science Writing 2016 and is author of Feeling the Heat. She continues to work as a freelance journalist.

== Career ==
In the industry for more than 30 years, Chandler started out on country newspapers, working as a cadet using a typewriter.

Chandler started with The Age newspaper in 1989; where she worked for much of her career, culminating in the role of Fairfax senior writer and roving national and international correspondent. As senior writer with The Age Chandler wrote in-depth reports and analysis of topics; with particular interests in humanitarian, women's issues, aid and development, Indigenous affairs and climate change.

Chandler's journalism has evolved and she has built on her skills and experience through a range of professional fellowships. She studied in the USA at the University of Missouri School of Journalism as a Rotary Scholar (1988/89) and travelled in 2006 to the UK on a Harry Brittain Fellowship for future senior editors with the Commonwealth Press Union and the British Foreign Office. She received two media fellowships with the Australian Antarctic Division, reporting from Casey Station and field research sites in 2007 and in 2009/10.

In 2005, after more than a decade in editing, she went back on the road as a reporter. She has filed news and features from assignments across Africa, Antarctica, Afghanistan, rural and remote Australia and Papua New Guinea earning numerous distinctions as an essayist, profile writer and narrative journalist, and is recognized across a range of specialty areas. Distinctions earned include the Walkley (Australia's Pulitzer Prize) and Quill awards, the Bragg Prize for Science Writing, the George Munster Award for Independent Journalism and the ACFID (Australian Council for International Media) Media award.

Chandler's work has been included in The Monthly, The Guardian, The Sydney Morning Herald, ABC Radio National, Cosmos, Good Weekend, The Weekend Australian Magazine, Griffith Review, New Scientist, The Global Mail (vale), BBC Online, and Undark among others. These stories include "It's 2013 And They're Burning Witches" and the personal "TB and Me".

Chandler edited Best Australian Science Writing 2016 (NewSouth) and is author of Feeling the Heat (Melbourne University Press).

== Personal life ==
Chandler lives in Melbourne and has two children.

Chandler is also a patient advocate for TB, having herself contracted drug resistant (MDR) TB while working as a journalist in PNG.

== Awards ==
- 1987-88 Rotary Foundation Scholarship (University of Missouri-Columbia School of Journalism).
- 2002 Australian Museum's Eureka Prize for Health and Medical Research Journalism for her role as editor in a series for The Age on the human genome.
- 2007 Australian Antarctic Division Fellowship.
- 2009 Australian Antarctic Division Fellowship.
- 2009 Walkley Award 'Commentary, Analysis, Opinion and Critique'.
- 2010 United Nations Association of Australia Media Peace Award for best print feature.
- 2013 Royal Australia New Zealand College of Obstetricians and Gynaecologists (RANZCOG) Media Award of Excellence.
- 2013 Quill award winner 'Best Feature in Writing', 'The Global Mail'.
- 2013 George Munster Prize for Independent Journalism for her series on PNG in the Global Mail.
- 2013 ACFID (Australian Council for International Media) Award for the series 'Project PNG' published in the Global Mail.
- 2014 Winner UNSW Bragg Prize for Science Writing for 'TB and me: a medical souvenir'.
- 2017 Winner Walkley Freelance Journalist of the Year.
- 2023 Winner Australian Museum Eureka Prize for Science Journalism for "Buried Treasure", Griffith Review

== Publications ==
- Chandler, J. (2011). Feeling the Heat, Carlton, Vic: Melbourne University Press, ISBN 9780522857719.
- Nixon, C. with Chandler, J. (2011). Fair Cop, Carlton, Vic: Victory Books, ISBN 9780522856859.
- Chandler, J. (Ed) (2016). The Best Australian Science Writing, Sydney, NSW: NewSouth Publishing, ISBN 1742235034.
