= Australian Centre for Independent Journalism =

The Australian Centre for Independent Journalism (ACIJ)(1990-2017) was a non-profit organisation based at the Broadway campus of the University of Technology, Sydney. The ACIJ was founded in 1990 as a Centre with close links to the University's Journalism School. The ACIJ ceased to operate in 2017, after campus authorities "killed it off", according to Pacific Journalism Review. The ACIJ's aims included assisting in the production of quality journalism, especially investigative journalism; to support research into journalism and the media and to contribute to scholarly debate and research about journalism.

The last Director of the Centre was Associate Professor Tom Morton who also teaches in the Journalism School at the University of Technology, Sydney. Staff and students of UTS and working journalists across Australia could apply for membership of the Centre.

Many high-profile Australian journalists have worked and been associated with the Centre, which was founded by Professor Julianne Schultz AM FAHA in 1990. Previous Directors and staff include Professor Julianne Schultz, Professor Wendy Bacon, Professor Chris Nash, Professor Alan Knight, journalists Brian Toohey, Peter Cronau, Michael Gawenda, Fran Molloy, Asa Wahlquist, Alexandra de Blas, Robert Manne, Dennis Shanahan, Willa McDonald and Margaret Simons.

The ACIJ's main projects were the production of the online magazine, ReportageOnline; running the George Munster Journalism Forums and the annual George Munster Award for Independent Journalism; running the annual Public Right to Know conference and other occasional seminars and publications. The ACIJ also ran short courses on journalism.
