= Wendy Bacon =

Australian academic, investigative journalist and political activist

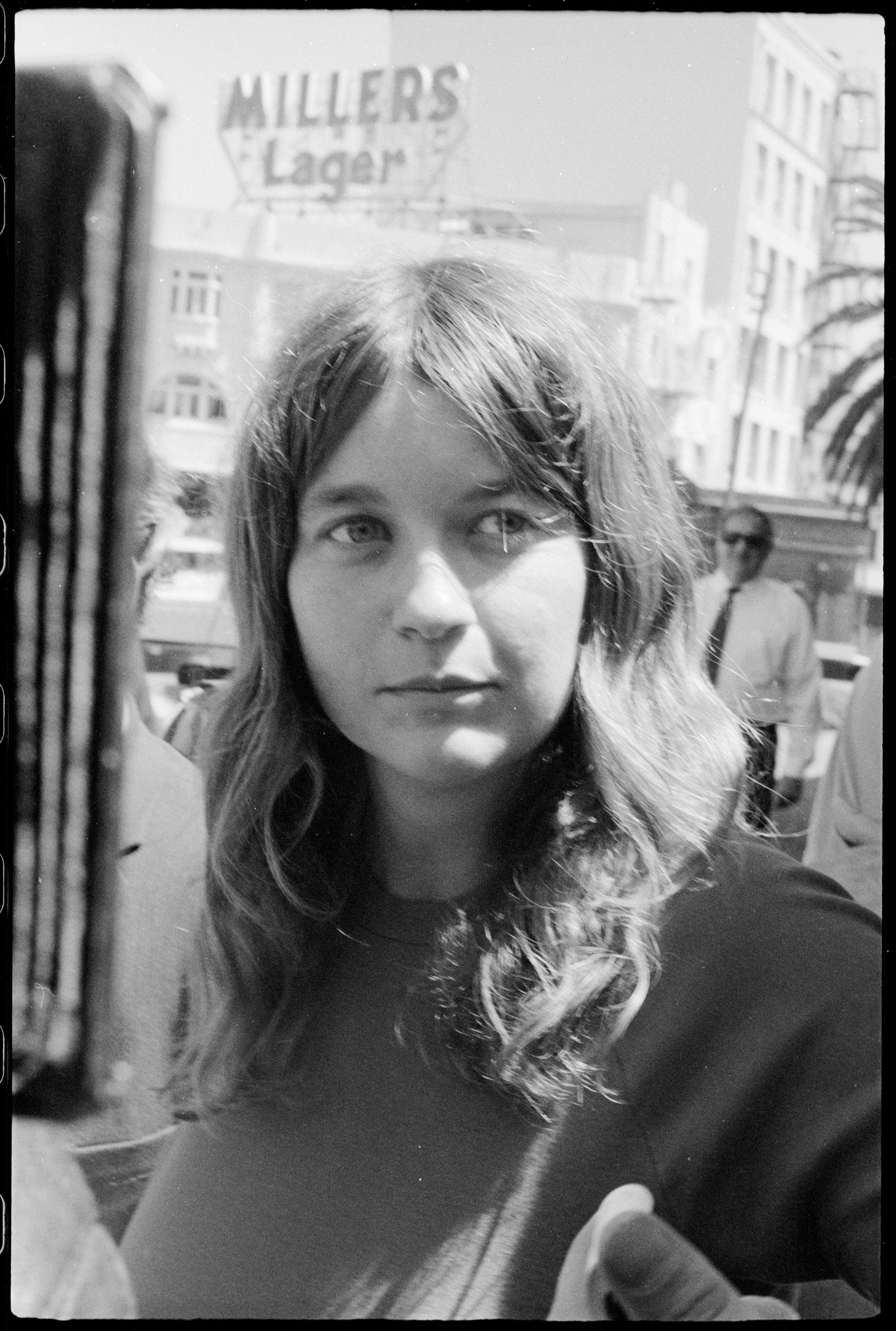
- Leaving court, Sydney 1972
- Born: 1946 (age 79–80)
- Education: University of Melbourne (BA)
- Occupations: Journalist, academic
- Website: www.wendybacon.com

Professor Wendy Bacon (born 1946) is an Australian academic, investigative journalist, and political activist who was head of the Journalism Program at the University of Technology, Sydney. She was awarded Australian journalism's highest prize, a Walkley Award in 1984 for her articles about police corruption in New South Wales.

On her own website Bacon describes her approach to journalism and political activism:

I am an investigative journalist who is also a political activist. This means that I want my journalism to be useful to those who resist abuses of power and seek social justice rather than supporting existing power structures, which is what most journalism does. My emphasis is on information that I hope will empower people to take action.

== Early life and activism ==
In the late 1960s, Bacon attended the University of New South Wales, where she was a member of the Kensington Libertarians, edited the student newspaper Tharunka and later the underground anti-censorship paper Thor. She was part of the group that distributed a publication called The Little Red Schoolbook which had explicit information about sex.

When she was 23, Bacon was convicted of "exhibiting an obscene publication" and given a good behaviour bond. She spent a week in Mulawah Women's Prison while awaiting sentence. Her brief experience in prison led her to later co-found the support group, Women Behind Bars, in Sydney and also exposed her to incidents of police corruption.

Between 1970 and 1981, Bacon's activism included issues such as repealing pornography laws, the dismissal of the Whitlam government, police corruption, prisoner treatment, and censorship laws. She was convicted ten times for protests, which included posting on building facades, displaying "obscenities", and disobeying the police. During this period, she met and associated with the resistance fighter and anarchist Jack the Anarchist, who spoke alongside her in at least one rally.

Bacon was denied entry to legal practice in the 1980s and her case became Australia's most famous for refusal to admit based on personal morality. Bacon enrolled in graduate law school in 1977. Upon graduation in 1979 she applied to join the New South Wales Bar Association. In her application, Bacon was candid about her prior activism, which the New South Wales Appeals Court acknowledged in stating that political radicalism or extremism played no role in admission to the bar. The Court questioned her fitness from a separate incident in 1979 in which she told the court that she had paid a client's bail using money borrowed from a mutual friend. The Court did not believe her account and cited this as evidence that Bacon had and would break the law in service of her activism.

== Journalism ==
Unable to practice law, Bacon became an investigative journalist, working for The National Times, the Sun Herald, Channel 9's Sunday program, 60 Minutes, and the Special Broadcasting Service's overseas program Dateline. During the mid-1980s, she was involved in reporting the case of High Court judge Lionel Murphy. Murphy, who was alleged by some to have connections to organised crime, was charged with perverting the course of justice, and convicted, but was acquitted after two appeals. Bacon received a Walkley award in 1984 for her exposure of official corruption in New South Wales.

Bacon wrote a series of articles in The National Times newspaper on the attempted bribe and murder of Detective Michael Drury in the 1980s and this story formed the basis of the award-winning ABC television mini-series, Blue Murder.

From 1991 to August 2012, Bacon was a professor at the University of Technology, Sydney, where she taught journalism at the Australian Centre for Independent Journalism (ACIJ). Bacon also ran courses in freedom of information law for Fairfax Media.

As a freelance investigative journalist, she has contributed hundreds of articles to a range of media outlets, including The Sydney Morning Herald, The Guardian, The Age, The Brisbane Times, New Matilda and more.

An example of the power of her work was a series of articles about a police officer's corrupt framing of his ex-wife, eventually leading to the overturn of a miscarriage of justice.

She continues to write, including for Michael West Media. Her blog includes a range of topics including politics, law and justice, women's issues and the environment .

== Activism ==
Alongside her distinguished career as a journalist and academic, Bacon remains interested in anarchism, feminism and political activism. She continues to be actively involved in movements for social justice, peace, and environmental issues.

In 2016 Bacon was arrested at a protest to stop the construction of the WestConnex motorway.

In 2025, she was arrested at a Rising Tide protest against coal exports.

== Oral history ==
An oral history interview with Bacon, recorded in 1999, is available at the National Library of Australia.

== See also ==
- Anarchism in Australia

== Bibliography ==
- Parker, Christine (2007). "Case Study: The Wendy Bacon Case". Inside Lawyers' Ethics. Cambridge University Press. pp. 249–251. ISBN 978-0-521-54664-5.
