= We Are Hunted =

Software company

- Type: Subsidiary of Twitter
- Industry: Music; Internet
- Founded: April 2009- April 2013
- Defunct: 2013
- Fate: Acquired by Twitter
- Headquarters: San Francisco, California
- Key people: Stephen Phillips (Founder/CTO); Richard Slatter (Founder/COO); Michael Doherty (Engineer); Adrian McLean (Designer/Editor); Ben Novakovic (Engineer); Ben Johnston (Founder/CPO); Jess Huddart (CDO)
- Products: Online music aggregation
- Number of employees: 10
- Website: wearehunted.com

We Are Hunted was a Brisbane-based software company that developed proprietary search technology which continuously scanned the Internet to identify the hottest new music in the world. The company was founded by Stephen Phillips, Richard Slatter, Michael Doherty and Nick Crocker in 2007.

The service provided a constant stream of new music, delivered in a simple, tile-based user interface.

We Are Hunted was originally owned and operated by Hunted Media, a web services company based in San Francisco, California. In late 2012, Twitter acquired the company, announcing plans to turn the platform into a new product called Twitter Music in early 2013.

== Music Charts ==
We Are Hunted was best known for its emerging music chart. The chart provided a continually updated list of the best new songs in the world, as measured by popularity on music blogs and social media. We Are Hunted also charted the most popular mainstream and top 40 artists in the world, and published music charts in a range of genres from electronic to metal.

== Technology ==
The We Are Hunted service was powered by a proprietary software system. The platform enabled data aggregation, machine learning and content recommendation services. The system generated the music charts, powered the dynamic playlists, and delivered detailed analytics and reporting. The platform indexed approximately 100,000 music articles and 40 million music related tweets each month. It actively monitored YouTube and the Facebook graph for artist activity. The service used an open source stack including Linux, Apache, Nginx, Python, Sphinx, Postgres, Django, Redis, Twisted, and more.

== Team ==
The core team responsible for the development of We Are Hunted was led by Stephen Phillips and Richard Slatter and included, Michael Doherty, Adrian McLean, and Ben Novakovic. UI/UX design was led by Jessica Huddart and Alex Naghavi of Josephmark. Several other people contributed greatly to the development of the service including Genevieve Robey, Russell Keith-Magee, David Novakovic, Mitch Malone, Nathan Oorloff, Jack Murphy, Ryan Blunden, Tom Knox, Eoin McCarthy, Simon Litchfield and the team at Josephmark.

The company was backed by Graeme Wood, the successful Australian Internet entrepreneur and philanthropist.

Hunted Media provided fee for service web and mobile development services to support the ongoing development of the We Are Hunted service. The Hunted Media team had established a reputation in the digital music industry as an app development powerhouse working with companies like MySpace, MTV, Sony, eMusic, SiriusXM, Condé Nast and The Echonest.

== Launch ==
The site was launched on 17 April 2009. It was featured on popular online technology blogs Wired, TechCrunch, Mashable and TechNation. We Are Hunted received over 100,000 visits in its first week online.

We Are Hunted was initially created and developed in Brisbane, Australia. The website concept arose from a discussion between founders Nick Crocker and Ben Johnston in early 2008. Crocker met Stephen Phillips, the founder of Australian news search engine Wotnews, in November 2008. After this initial meeting, Crocker and Phillips decided to work together to bring the idea to life. Crocker and Johnston finalised the site concept, developed the brand name and logo, and designed the first version of the user interface. The Wotnews technical team then, over several weeks, created the first version of the site, including the core music intelligence platform and innovative website interface. Six weeks after launch, the site was purchased by Wotnews from Native Digital. Wotnews was eventually rebranded Hunted Media. After mid 2009, We Are Hunted was a web property developed and managed 100% by the Hunted Media team.

== Acquisition By Twitter ==
The Hunted Media team relocated to San Francisco and was working on the third version of the We Are Hunted service. On 11 April 2013, Hunted Media announced they were shutting down their website due to Twitter acquiring the company. We Are Hunted was transformed into the Twitter #Music App.
