= Julianne Schultz =

Australian academic and literary editor

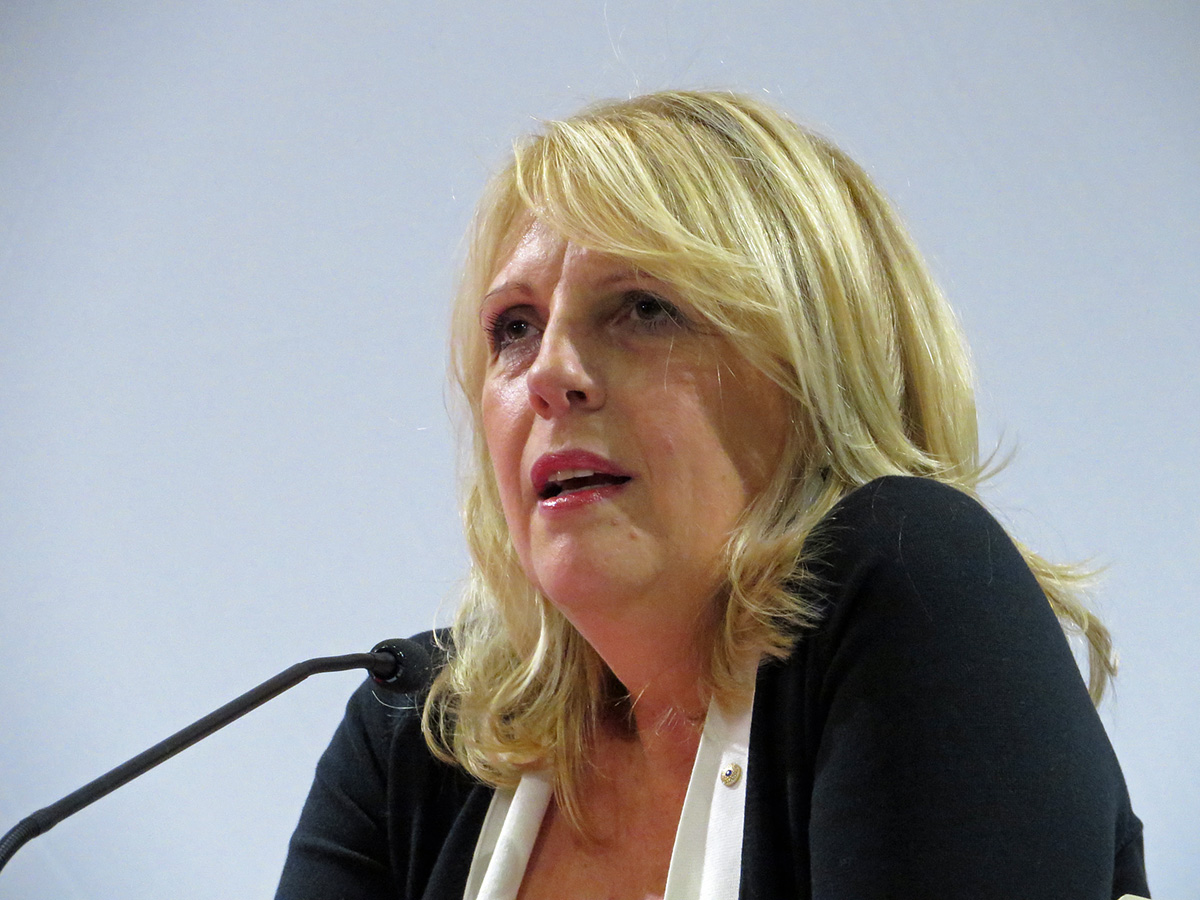
Schultz speaks at the University of Sydney in 2013

Julianne Schultz AM FAHA (born 1956) is an Australian academic, media manager, author and editor. She was the founding editor of the Australian literary and current affairs journal Griffith Review. She is currently an emeritus professor at Griffith University's Centre for Social and Cultural Research.

== Early years and education ==
Schultz was born on 2 January 1956 in Hamilton, Victoria. Her father, Dr Noel Schultz, was born and brought up in the Darling Downs in Queensland and married Dr Cynthia Weiss in Adelaide in 1955 after he graduated from Concordia Lutheran College. Cynthia was a deaconess of the Lutheran Church in South Australia. Noel Schultz was appointed the Lutheran pastor at Hamilton, Victoria, and was subsequently appointed pastor at Gilgandra, New South Wales, Tabor in Victoria and Brisbane, before joining the Uniting Church in Melbourne. Cynthia Schultz trained as a psychologist at the University of Queensland and subsequently taught at La Trobe University, Melbourne.

Schultz completed her school education at St Peters Lutheran College in Brisbane and went on to gain a Bachelor of Arts in journalism at the University of Queensland, graduating in 1976. She was co-editor, with Jane Camens, of the University of Queensland student newspaper Semper Floreat. Schultz later completed a PhD at the University of Sydney in 1996, in which she explored the contemporary relevance of the fourth estate to the practice of journalism in Australia.^{[2]} She was awarded a Graduate Certificate in management from the Australian Graduate School of Management, University of New South Wales in 2003.

== Career ==
Schultz began her career as a researcher and producer in radio with the ABC in Brisbane and in 1977 moved to The Australian Financial Review in Melbourne as a reporter. After working as a journalist in London, she became a producer for ABC TV on Four Corners in Sydney in 1981 and was appointed as lecturer in journalism at the NSW Institute of Technology (later UTS) the following year. She was promoted to senior lecturer in 1986 and to associate professor in 1989, when she became the founding director of the Australian Centre for Independent Journalism, which she led until 1994.

She was a visiting fellow at the Research School of Social Sciences at the Australian National University between 1991 and 1994, and after moving to Brisbane in 1994, was appointed adjunct professor in journalism at the Queensland University of Technology. She joined The Courier-Mail as associate editor and columnist between 1995 and 1997. In 1998, Schultz took up the position of general manager, corporate strategy and communications for the ABC in Sydney, where she was employed until 2000.

She has been a director of Strategies & Solutions Group Pty Ltd, and undertook many consulting projects focusing on media, digital futures and culture. In 2003, Schultz was appointed professor and founding editor of Griffith Review, published by Griffith University. Griffith Review has since published work from almost one thousand authors, and more than 150 fiction and non-fiction books have been developed from essays and stories first published in the journal, which marked its 50th edition in 2015. Schultz became publisher of Griffith Review in 2018, with author Ashley Hay taking over the role of editor.

== Personal life ==
Schultz is married to technology consultant Ian Reinecke AM and has two children. She has a sister, Cindy Schultz Ferguson, a former management consultant, and a brother, Andrew Schultz, a well-known classical music composer. Julianne wrote the libretti of two operas written by Andrew – Going into Shadows (2001) and Black River (1992).

== Honours ==
Schultz was appointed a Member of the Order of Australia for services to the community as a writer, editor and academic in 2009. She was elected the following year as an Honorary Fellow of the Australian Academy of Humanities. She was awarded a special commendation from the Australian Human Rights and Equal Opportunity Commission for excellence in commentary at The Courier-Mail in 1997. The film adaptation of Black River, (directed by Kevin Lucas) won the Opera Screen Grand Prix at Opéra Bastille, Paris in 1993.

== Professional roles ==
Schultz has held numerous board-level roles in her professional career, including member of the Ideas for Australia Advisory Committee, National Centre for Australian Studies, Monash University (1991–1994); coordinator, Brisbane Women's Media Forum (1997); member, Appeal Committee, Media Entertainment and Arts Alliance (1997); Member of ABC Independent Complaints Review panel (1996–1998); ambassador, Australian Indigenous Educational Foundation (2008–13); advisory board, Centre for Advancing Journalism, University of Melbourne (2000–present). She has been a judge of major literary and journalism awards, including chairing the panel for the Premier's award for work of state significance at the Queensland Literary Awards in 2015.

Schultz was appointed as co-chair with actress Cate Blanchett of the Creative Australia Stream for the 2020 Summit at Parliament House, Canberra, in 2008. From 2009 to 2013, she was chair of the Queensland Design Council and chair of the National Cultural Policy Reference Group (2011–13).

Schultz was chair of the Council of the Australian Film Television and Radio Authority from 2012 to 2015, and resumed the position for one year from March 2016. From 2009 to 2014, she was a director of the board of the Australian Broadcasting Corporation, and between 1998 and 2013 she was a director of the Grattan Institute, Melbourne. She was director of the Copyright Agency Ltd between 1997 and 2000 and a director of the Communications Law Centre between 1990 and 1994.

She was longlisted for the inaugural Australian Political Book of the Year in 2022 for The Idea of Australia.

== Political views ==
In her book The Idea of Australia – A Search For the Soul of the Nation, Schultz argued Australians can choose to improve and be more confident. She described Australia as a place where forgetting is essential.

== Bibliography ==
=== Books ===
- Reinecke, Ian & Julianne Schultz (1983). The phone book : the future of Australia's communications on the line. Melbourne: Penguin Books.
- Steel City Blues (1985)
- Not Just Another Business (1994)
- Reviving the Fourth Estate (1998)
- Journalism: Print Politics & Popular Culture (edited with Ann Curthoys, 1999)
- The Idea of Australia: A search for the soul of the nation (2022)

=== Essays and reporting ===
- Schultz, Julianne (Autumn 2010). "We are what we eat". Introduction. Griffith Review. 27: 1–4.

=== Critical studies and reviews of Schultz's work ===
The idea of Australia

- Phiddian, Robert (October 2022). "The figure in the carpet : the stories we tell ourselves". Australian Book Review. 447: 34–35.
