= Graeme Wood (businessman) =

Australian entrepreneur

Graeme Wood AM
- Born: Graeme Thomas Wood; 1947 (age 78–79); Rockhampton, Queensland, Australia
- Education: University of Queensland (B.Ec, M.IS)
- Occupation: Entrepreneur

Graeme Thomas Wood AM (born 1947) is an Australian digital entrepreneur, philanthropist and environmentalist. He founded the websites Wotif.com and The Global Mail. Wood has also invested in The Guardian Australia.

== Career ==
Wood founded The Global Mail, a not-for-profit multimedia site for journalism in the public interest. In July 2013, The Global Mail became the first institutional member of the Washington-based International Consortium of Investigative Journalists (ICIJ), as part of Wood's three-year, US$1.5 million grant to bolster cross-border investigative reporting. Other businesses Wood has founded include Wild Mob (2008), a not-for-profit organisation that aims to protect Australia's most threatened species and ecosystems by giving young people the opportunity to participate in conservation work and environmental education; Artology (2011), an organisation focused on youth development and social change through the arts; and Wotnews, which closed in 2012 after spawning We Are Hunted, a music recommendation website sold to Twitter in 2013.

The Graeme Wood Foundation supports environmental sustainability, the arts, tertiary education and improved justice for Australia's Indigenous community. In 2010, he gave a political donation of A$1.6 million, to The Greens and is a donor of University of Queensland, the University of Tasmania, and Melbourne University. In January 2013, Wood became a backer of the digital arm of British newspaper The Guardian in Australia, which he said would add quality and diversity to Australian media and foster a closer interaction with the rest of the world. In October 2016, leaked emails from the account of John Podesta included a claim by a public relations company, Fenton Communications, that Wood had pledged US$500,000 towards an advertising campaign to counter the climate change denial stance of media owned by Rupert Murdoch. Wood has since stated, "It sounded like a good idea at the time but in the end I didn’t proceed with any funding".

In 2011, Wood acquired the Triabunna Woodchip Mill in Tasmania. He submitted plans for the rejuvenation of the site, renamed Spring Bay Mill, in September 2016.

== Awards and honours ==
Wood was made a Member of the Order of Australia (AM) in the 2012 Australia Day Honours. He was awarded Suncorp Queenslander of the Year and received an Honorary Doctorate of Economics from the University of Queensland.
