= St Aloysius College, Cronulla =

St Aloysius College

Location
- 2 Cross Road; Cronulla, New South Wales, 2230; Australia; 34°3′22″S 151°8′32″E

Information
- Former names: De La Salle College
- Type: Independent comprehensive co-educational secondary day school
- Religious affiliation: De La Salle Brothers
- Denomination: Roman Catholic
- Established: 2024; 2 years ago
- Educational authority: New South Wales Education Standards Authority
- Oversight: Sydney Catholic Schools
- Principal: Stephen Mahoney
- Staff: 64 (2023)
- Years: 7–12
- Enrolment: 411 (2023)
- Campus type: Suburban
- Colours: Navy, gold and white
- Website: stalscronulla.syd.catholic.edu.au

St Aloysius College is an independent Roman Catholic comprehensive co-educational secondary day school, located in Cronulla a southern suburb of Sydney, New South Wales, Australia. It is named for the heroic young Italian Jesuit saint Aloysius Gonzaga (1568-1591), who is the patron saint of youth.

== History ==
In 1936, the De La Salle Brothers purchased a bushland property, 'Kilkivan Grange,' for the purpose of a college for Catholic boys and used an existing house on the property for boarding students.

Brother Donatus Slattery, an Irishman, was appointed the inaugural Principal of De La Salle College Cronulla in 1936; he died in Sydney in 1962.

From 1936 to 1967, students from Primary classes to Leaving Certificate level attended the college, but in 1967, in co-operation with the nearby De La Salle College in Caringbah, the present structure of a Senior College for Years 11 and 12 only was established.

In 1975, the College admitted girls for the first time, accepting school certificate graduates from Our Lady of Mercy College, Burraneer. In 1990 the Catholic Education Office, Archdiocese of Sydney took over administrative responsibility for the college.

Former Principal Brother Stan Carmody (died 5 February 2011, aged 92) encouraged the development of the senior rugby league team which produced several National Rugby League players.

In 1994, the first lay principal was appointed.

In 2024, the college will welcome its first intake of Year 7 students with the college to become a fully co-educational Year 7 to 12 college from 2027. Additionally, the name of the college will change to Saint Aloysius College reflecting the close ties the school has with the local parish of St. Aloysius in Cronulla.

== College Principals ==
- Brother Donatus Slattery (1936)
- Brother Vincent Latham (1937)
- Brother George Lyons (1938–1939)
- Brother Eugene Donegan (1940–1945)
- Brother Dositheus O’Dea (1946–1949)
- Brother Leo Caldwell (1950–1954)
- Brother Leopold Deignan (1955–1960)
- Brother John Neil (1961–1966)
- Brother Celestine Gavin (1967–1973)
- Brother Walter Farrell (1974)
- Brother Edward Gehrig (1975–1976)
- Brother Stanislaus Carmody (1977–1986)
- Brother Kenneth Ormerod (1987–1989)
- Brother Malachy Yates (1990–1993)
- Mrs Julia O’Connor (1994–1995)
- Mr John Maguire (1996–2004)
- Mr John Riordan (2005–2008)
- Mr Phil Gane (2009–2015)
- Mr Craig Mooney (2016–2019)
- Mr Stephen Mahoney (2020–present)

== Notable alumni ==
- John Della Bosca – politician
- Jonathan Docking – rugby league football player
- Andrew Ettingshausen – athlete
- Michael Forshaw – Senator
- Steve Hutchins – Senator and ALP president
- John Kane and Genni Kane – musicians in the band Flying Emus
- John Lee – former Director General of the NSW Department of Premier & Cabinet and now CEO of the Tourism and Transport Forum of Australia
- Michael Lee – former Federal Minister
- Fran Molloy – journalist
- Peter Morrissey – fashion designer
- Tony Sheldon – Australian Senator
- Carmel Tebbutt – former Deputy Premier of NSW
- Mark Vincent – opera singer
- Vanessa Ware – netball player
- Glenn Wheeler – TV/radio personality
- Brendan Cowell – actor

== See also ==
- List of Catholic schools in New South Wales
- Lasallian educational institutions
- Catholic education in Australia
