= Nicholas Stuart =

Australian journalist

Nicholas Stuart is an Australian journalist who is editor-in-chief of abilitynews.org. He is the author of three books about Australian politics.

== Early life ==
Stuart is the child of Ron Stuart, a research officer with the Reserve Bank of Australia, and his wife Ruth.

Stuart's father was offered a position in Port Moresby, Papua New Guinea (then a dependent territory of Australia) when Nicolas was 4 years old and he was brought up in Port Moresby until the age of 10. After travelling the world for a year, the family moved back to Sydney, where he attended Sydney Grammar School. Stuart studied Arts/Law at Sydney University where he was a member of the Sydney University Regiment of the Australian Army Reserve. Stuart then studied for an MA in War Studies at King's College London in 1984.

== Career ==
When he returned to Australia the next year Stuart became a cadet radio news journalist with the Australian Broadcasting Corporation, gaining wide reporting experience. He later reported on politics and international events for the Radio Current Affairs programs "AM" and "PM", before moving to the ABC TV environmental program "A Question of Survival".

He covered the aftermath of the 1989 Tiananmen protests in China before becoming the ABC's Indochina Correspondent, based in Bangkok. Stuart was critically injured in a vehicle accident in Bangkok in late 1990 when he was left in a coma. He later returned to work in Bangkok and covered the 1992 demonstrations that led to the fall of the military-backed government of the country. He received a rare High Commendation issued by the Walkley Award judges that year. However, the ABC believed he had not properly recovered from his accident and was recalled to Australia. After working for a period in the Corporation's International Operations division, he later left the ABC.

Stuart accompanied his wife, Catherine McGrath, to Singapore where she was based as an ABC correspondent in 1995. McGrath later became Chief Political Correspondent for ABC Radio; Political Editor for Television Australia; and Chief Political Correspondent for SBS Television.

When they returned to Canberra Stuart began writing as a columnist with The Canberra Times. Stuart's newspaper column specialises in coverage of strategic and defence issues reflecting his time in the Army Reserves and MA studies.

== Books ==
His unauthorised biography of Kevin Rudd ("Kevin Rudd - an unauthorised political biography") has been described by Monash University's Senior Lecturer in Economics Nick Economou as "requisite reading for observers of Australian national politics". The book has been assessed as a fair, balanced and generally positive treatment of Rudd.

Within a month of the election of the new Labor government Stuart published another 96,000 word book ("What Goes Up") analysing the last term of the Howard government and identifying the significant factors that resulted in the change of government at the 2007 election. This has received similar positive reviews in the Sydney Morning Herald, The Australian, and The Age newspapers.

Less than one month after the fall of Kevin Rudd Stuart published his third book, "Rudd's Way". This book describes reasons why the ALP decided to remove Rudd from the leadership, making him the only successful Labor prime minister never to face re-election.

== Involvement with disability issues ==
Stuart has become increasingly involved with disability issues, initially as a Director and later President of the National Brain Injury Foundation of Australia. As a result he became an ex-officio Director of Brain Injury Australia between 2011 and 2014. In 2013 Stuart was elected as a Director of The House with No Steps, then Australia's second-largest provider of services for people with a disability.

He is currently editor-in-chief of the website abilitynews.org which is dedicated to providing relevant information about disability issues and the NDIS to the broader community.

== Fellowships ==
In 2015 Stuart was a Press Fellow at Wolfson College, Cambridge.

In 2016 Stuart received a Churchill Fellowship to study long-term recovery after head injury.
