= The Global Mail =

Multimedia site for longform and project-based journalism

- Website type: News
- Available in: English
- Dissolved: 2014
- Headquarters: Sydney, Australia
- Area served: Worldwide
- Key people: Lauren Martin, Managing Editor. Jane Nicholls, CEO
- Website: theglobalmail.org
- Advertising: None
- Launched: 6 February 2012

The Global Mail was a not-for-profit multimedia site for longform and project-based journalism in the public interest operating from 2012 to 2014. Based in Sydney, Australia, the site launched in February 2012 with philanthropic funding from internet entrepreneur Graeme Wood, who committed funding for five years.

In July 2013, The Global Mail became the first institutional member of the Washington-based International Consortium of Investigative Journalists (ICIJ), as part of an effort to bolster cross-border investigative reporting. The partnership involves funding a new Global Investigative Journalism Fellowship for an Australian journalist and full-time research desk for the consortium.

The Global Mail was free to access and free of advertising. By contrast with other news sites, it primarily focuses on investigative, long-form and data journalism and analysis, electing not to "swim in the 24/7 news cycle."

== Data journalism ==
The Global Mail partnered with transparency groups on data led investigations. In February 2013, The Global Mail partnered with OpenAustralia.org to create a tool to search Australia's Hansard database. During the Australian Federal Election, the site produced a data tool allowing Australian voters to see how all parties on the September federal election ballot would allocate their preferences; the tool was shared on the Guardian Australia site. Partnering with DetentionLogs.com.au and RightoKnow.org.au it created a vehicle for crowd-sourcing Freedom of Information requests for information through a data visualisation, Behind the Wire.

== Partnerships ==
The Global Mail frequently partnered with larger commercial media organisations to increase impact for its stories. The site has published with The Guardian and the Guardian Australia, Radio National's Background Briefing, The Daily Beast, Time, SBS Dateline, and CNN International.

== Awards ==
The Global Mail's work was recognised with awards and nominations for data journalism (for its Powerhouse blog of data and analysis from Australia's parliament) and photography as well as for its writing – including Walkley award nominations for feature writing, international journalism, investigative journalism; Walkley finalists in Young Journalist of the Year categories in both 2012 and 2013; and a UNAA Environment Day Awards category finalist in for Media. Staff photographer Ella Rubeli won the 2013 Walkley Young Journalist of the Year award for camerawork.

The Global Mail published the photo that won the inaugural Nikon-Walkley Photo of the Year (2013) and has finalists for two 2013 Walkley Awards; two of the three finalists for the Walkley Freelance Journalist of the Year award submitted work first published in The Global Mail. Jo Chandler was the winner of the Australian Council For International Development (ACFID) Media Award, and a finalist in the inaugural Lowy Institute Media Award for her work for The Global Mail. Chandler's feature, The Last Laughing Death was included in The Best Australian Science Writing 2013, as were two other stories from The Global Mail.

The Global Mail also has won three Kennedy Awards for outstanding journalism, and has three finalists in the Human Rights Awards for print and online media for 2013.

On 28 November 2013, photojournalist Barat Ali Batoor was awarded two Walkley Awards for excellence in journalism, for work published on The Global Mail. One was for photo of the year, the other for best photographic essay of the year.

In 2012, writer Paul Connolly's The Global Mail piece on Australian sprinter Josh Ross won 'Best Profiling of an Athlete, Team or Coach' in the annual Australian Sports Commission Media Awards.

== Closure ==
In January 2014, Wood told staff that he would cease funding the newspaper, and they would need to seek alternative funding to remain in operation. This didn't eventuate, and by the end of the next month the website had a notice at the top of the home page stating "The Global Mail has ceased operations."
