= G Magazine (Australia) =

Australian consumer sustainability magazine

G: The Green Lifestyle Magazine
- Editor: Nguyen Ty Phu
- Categories: Lifestyle Environment Magazine
- Frequency: Bimonthly
- Total circulation: 35,000
- Founded: 2006
- Company: Next Media Pty Ltd
- Country: Australia
- Based in: Sydney
- Language: English
- Website: gmagazine.com.au
- ISSN: 1834-1233

G magazine is a bi-monthly Australian consumer sustainability magazine, published in Sydney. The first issue of G magazine went on sale in November 2006, and G-Online went live in September 2008.

The publication was launched and published by Luna Media, and purchased by Next Media (previously Wolseley Media) in January 2009.

Editorial advisors include Sir Richard Branson, British entrepreneur; Patrice Newell, author and former TV presenter; Nick Rowley, a former climate change advisor to Tony Blair; Jon Dee, founder and chairman of the Australian advocacy organisation Do Something! and co-founder of Planet Ark; and Maria Atkinson, co-founder of the Green Building Council and global head of sustainability for Lend Lease.

== Awards ==
At the 2006 Bell Awards for Publishing Excellence, Luna Media was named Best Small Publisher.

At the 2007 Bell Awards, G won Consumer Magazine of the Year (print run over 30,000) and Best Magazine Launch. It was also commended for its editorial, design, publishing, and advertising sales.

At the 2008 Bell Awards, G-Online, won Best Internet Site for G-Online from the Bell Awards for Publishing Excellence. Also in 2008, Sara Phillips won Editor of the Year award, and Best Magazine Supplement for September The Green Book. The magazine's publisher, Luna Media, won the inaugural Sustainability in Publishing award.

Also in 2008, Luna Media was also awarded both the inaugural Lord Mayor's Sustainability Award and Environmental Business Award at the City of Sydney Business Awards.

In January 2009 it was sold to Next Media (previously Wolseley Media) and in 2015 it ceased publication.

== Sections ==
- Trailblazers: Short articles about people and organizations working on sustainability
- G People: Interviews with people in the environmental movement
- Instant Expert: Quick summary of an environmental issue
- Versus: Compares items to see which is the more environmentally friendly
- General features: Long-form articles
- Department features: Food, Garden, Health and Wellbeing, Home, Kids
- Travel: Ecologically friendly travel
- By The Numbers: Statistics on environmental issues
