= Griffith Review =

Quarterly journal, founded in 2003

- Language: English

Publication details
- History: 2003 to present
- Publisher: Text Publishing, for Griffith University (Australia)
- Frequency: Quarterly

Standard abbreviations
- ISO 4: Griffith Rev.

Indexing
- ISSN: 1448-2924

Links
- Journal homepage

Griffith Review is a quarterly publication featuring essays, reportage, memoir, fiction, poetry and artwork from established and emerging writers and artists. The publication was founded in 2003 by Griffith University in Australia, and was initially published by ABC Books. In 2009, Text Publishing became the Review's publishing partner and distributor. Therefore, the magazine has bases in both Brisbane and Melbourne. Julianne Schultz was the founding editor and has been publisher since 2018, when Ashley Hay was appointed editor.

== Awards ==
- 2007 Victorian Premier's Literary Award - Alfred Deakin Prize for an Essay Advancing Public Debate was awarded to Frank Moorhouse
- 2007 Walkley Award for Excellence in Journalism
  - Finalist for the Magazine Feature Writing category - Margaret Simons for her essay "Buried in the labyrinth"
  - Winner for the Social Equity Journalism category - Frank Moorhouse for "The writer in a time of terror"
- 2013 Walkley Award for Excellence in Journalism
  - Winner for the Coverage of Indigenous Affairs category - Kathy Marks for her reportage piece "Channelling Mannalargenna"
  - Winner for the Long Feature Writing category - Melissa Lucashenko for her reportage piece "Sinking below sight"
- 2014 Human Rights Awards - journalist and editor Peter Mares was shortlisted for the Print and Online Award for his piece "Refuge without work"

== See also ==
- List of literary magazines
