= Kasey Chambers discography =

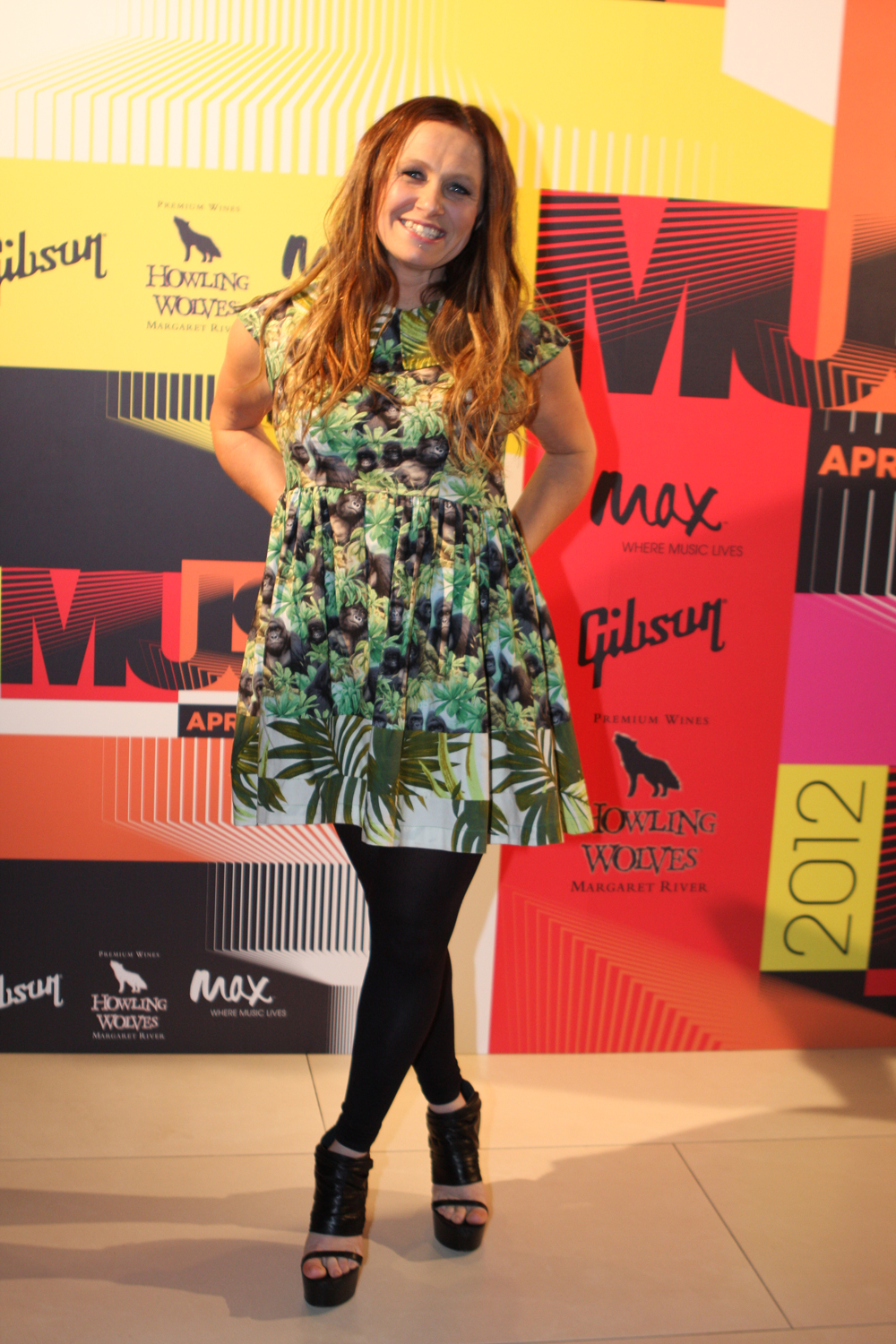
- Chambers in 2012
- Studio albums: 13
- EPs: 1

The discography of Kasey Chambers, an Australian singer-songwriter, consists of thirteen studio albums.

Chambers' first album was released in 1999. She has since achieved five number-one albums on the ARIA Albums Chart, fourteen ARIA Music Awards, and was inducted into the ARIA Hall of Fame in 2018, making her the youngest woman to recognised with this achievement.

== Studio albums ==
Title	Album details	Peak chart positions						Certifications (sales threshold)
Title	Album details	AUS	US Country	US	US Heat	US Folk	US Indie	Certifications (sales threshold)
The Captain	Release date: 17 May 1999; Format: CD, digital download; Label: EMI Records	11	49	—	—	—	—	AUS: 3× Platinum
Barricades & Brickwalls	Release date: 3 September 2001; Format: CD, digital download; Label: Warner Bros. Records	1	13	104	1	—	—	AUS: 7× Platinum
Wayward Angel	Release date: 31 May 2004; Format: CD, digital download; Label: Warner Bros. Records	1	31	—	15	—	—	AUS: 3× Platinum
Carnival	Release date: 19 August 2006; Format: CD, digital download; Label: EMI Records	1	—	—	22	—	—	AUS: Platinum
Rattlin' Bones (with Shane Nicholson)	Release date: 19 April 2008; Format: CD, digital download; Label: Liberation Music (Aus/NZ), Sugar Hill Records (US/Worldwide)	1	—	—	21	—	—	AUS: Platinum
Kasey Chambers, Poppa Bill and the Little Hillbillies (with Bill Chambers and the Little Hillbillies)	Release date: 6 November 2009; Format: CD, digital download; Label: Liberation Music	58	—	—	—	—	—	
Little Bird	Release date: 17 September 2010; Format: CD, digital download; Label: Liberation Music (Aus/NZ), Sugar Hill Records (US/Worldwide)	3	32	—	6	9	39	AUS: Gold
Storybook	Release date: 23 September 2011; Format: CD, digital download; Label: Liberation Music (Aus/NZ), Sugar Hill Records (US/Worldwide)	21	53	—	16	19	—	
Wreck & Ruin (with Shane Nicholson)	Release date: 23 October 2012; Format: CD, digital download; Label: Liberation Music (Aus/NZ), Sugar Hill Records (US/Worldwide)	6	35	—	15	10	—	
Bittersweet	Release date: 29 August 2014; Format: CD, digital download; Label: Warner Music Australia	2	49	—	24	23	—	
Dragonfly	Release date: 20 January 2017; Format: CD, digital download; Label: Warner Music Australia	1	—	—	—	—	—	
Campfire (with The Fireside Disciples)	Release date: 27 April 2018; Format: CD, digital download, streaming, vinyl; Label: Warner Music Australia	6	—	—	—	—	—	
Backbone	Release date: 4 October 2024; Format: CD, digital download, streaming, vinyl; Label: Essence	3	—	—	—	—	—	
"—" denotes releases that did not chart or not released to that country

=== Video albums ===
List of video albums with selected details
Title	Details	Certification
Behind the Barricades	Released: 2002; Label: Capitol; Formats: DVD	ARIA: Platinum

== Extended plays ==
Title	Extended play details	Peak chart positions
Title	Extended play details	AUS
Ain't No Little Girl	Release date: 26 August 2016; Format: CD, digital download; Label: Warner Music Australia	99

== Singles ==
Year	Title	Peak chart positions		Certifications (sales threshold)	Album
Year	Title	AUS	NZ	Certifications (sales threshold)	Album
1999	"Cry Like a Baby"	71	—		The Captain
1999	"Don't Talk Back"	—	—		The Captain
2000	"The Captain"	68	—		The Captain
2001	"Runaway Train"	86	—		Barricades & Brickwalls
2001	"On a Bad Day"	147	—		Barricades & Brickwalls
2002	"Not Pretty Enough"	1	4	AUS: 2× Platinum	Barricades & Brickwalls
2002	"Million Tears"	32	—		Barricades & Brickwalls
2002	"If I Were You"	32	—		Barricades & Brickwalls
2003	"True Colours"	4	—	AUS: Gold	Non-album single
2004	"Hollywood"	28	—		Wayward Angel
2005	"Pony"	10	—		Wayward Angel
2005	"Saturated"	75	—		Wayward Angel
2006	"Nothing at All"	9	—		Carnival
2006	"Surrender"	74	—		Carnival
2008	"Rattlin' Bones" (with Shane Nicholson)	55	—		Rattlin' Bones
2008	"Monkey on a Wire" (with Shane Nicholson)	—	—		Rattlin' Bones
2009	"Wildflower" (with Shane Nicholson)	—	—		Rattlin' Bones
2010	"The Lost Music Blues"	—	—		Kasey Chambers Poppa Bill & the Little Hillbillies
2010	"Little Bird"	82	—		Little Bird
2011	"Beautiful Mess"	—	—		Little Bird
2011	"Luka"	166	—		Storybook
2012	"Adam and Eve" (with Shane Nicholson)	—	—		Wreck & Ruin
2012	"The Quiet Life" (with Shane Nicholson)	—	—		Wreck & Ruin
2013	"Wreck & Ruin" (with Shane Nicholson)	—	—		Wreck & Ruin
2014	"Wheelbarrow"	—	—		Bittersweet
2014	"Bittersweet"	116	—		Bittersweet
2015	"Is God Real?"	—	—		Bittersweet
2016	"Satellite"	—	—		Dragonfly
2018	"The Campfire Song"	—	—		Campfire
2018	"Goliath is Dead"	—	—		Campfire
2019	"Whispering Voice" (with Ash Grunwald)	—	—		Mojo
2019	"When We’re Both Old & Mad" (with Paul Kelly)	—	—		Songs from the South: 1985–2019
2019	"Southern Pace" (with Carly Burruss)	—	—		Non-album single
2021	"Valentines Day" (with Paul Field)	—	—		Love Songs for Lonely People
2021	"Good People" (with Bliss n Eso)	—	—		The Sun (Bliss n Eso album)
2022	"Lose Yourself" (live at Civic Theater)	—	—		Backbone
2024	"Backbone (The Desert Child)"	—	—		Backbone
2024	"A Love like Springsteen"	—	—		Backbone
2025	"The Divorce Song" (featuring Shane Nicholson)	—	—		Backbone
"—" denotes releases that did not chart or not released to that country

== Music videos ==
Year	Video	Director
2000	"Cry Like a Baby"	Paul Elliott
2001	"Runaway Train"	
2002	"Not Pretty Enough"	Danny Passman
2004	"Like a River"	Sean Gilligan
2004	"Hollywood"	
2005	"Saturated"	
2006	"Nothing at All"	
2008	"Rattlin' Bones" (with Shane Nicholson)	Helen Clemens
2011	"Little Bird"	Gemma Lee
2011	"Beautiful Mess"	
2011	"Luka"	
2012	"Adam & Eve" (with Shane Nicholson)	Duncan Toombs
2013	"The Quiet Life" (with Shane Nicholson)	Duncan Toombs
2014	"Wheelbarrow"	Renny Wijeyamohan
2014	"Bittersweet" (with Bernard Fanning)	Renny Wijeyamohan
2015	"Is God Real?"	
2016	"Ain't No Little Girl"	
2016	"Satellite"	
2018	"The Campfire Song"	
2018	"Goliath is Dead"	
2019	"When We're Both Old & Mad"	
2019	"Go On Your Way"	
2024	"Backbone (The Desert Child)"	
2024	"A Love Like Springsteen"	

=== Other appearances ===
List of other non-single song appearances
Title	Year	Album
"Matilda No More" (with Slim Dusty)	2000	Looking Forward Looking Back
"Tear Stained Eyes"	2001	107.1 KGSR Radio Austin - Broadcasts Vol.9
"Little Sparrow"	2003	Just Because I'm a Woman: Songs of Dolly Parton
"You're Learning" (with Paul Kelly and the Stormwater Boys)	2005	Foggy Highway
"Better Be Home Soon"	2005	She Will Have Her Way
"When Two Hearts Collide" (with Jimmy Barnes)	2007	Out in the Blue
"In the Jailhouse Now" (with Shane Nicholson)	2009	Both Sides Now
"Cootamundra Wattle" (with John Williamson)	2010	Absolute Greatest: 40 Years True Blue
"Hold On" (with Shane Nicholson)	2010	Long Gone Whistle - The Songs of Maurice Frawley
"Sleeping Cold" (with Shane Nicholson)	2011	Mad Bastards
"When Two Hearts Collide" (with Jimmy Barnes)	2011	Floodlight - Barnes Family Songs For Flood Relief
"Christmas Time" (with Bill Chambers)	2011	Rockwiz: The Christmas Album
"Cold and Bitter Tears" (with Bill Chambers)	2015	Cold and Bitter Tears: The Songs of Ted Hawkins
"Leave On a Light " (with Bill Chambers)	2016	Leave On a Light - The Songs of Karl Broadie
"Black Bess" (with Jimmy Barnes)	2020	Cannot Buy My Soul: The Songs of Kev Carmody
"Walk a Country Mile" (excerpt) (with Bill Chambers)	2020	Slim and I
"The Friend Beasts" (with Dan Kelly) (with Paul Kelly)	2021	Paul Kelly's Christmas Train
"Watch Over Me" (with Bernard Fanning and Claire Bowditch)	2025	Tea & Symphony (20th Anniversary)
