= List of awards and nominations received by Kasey Chambers =

Kasey Chambers awards and nominations
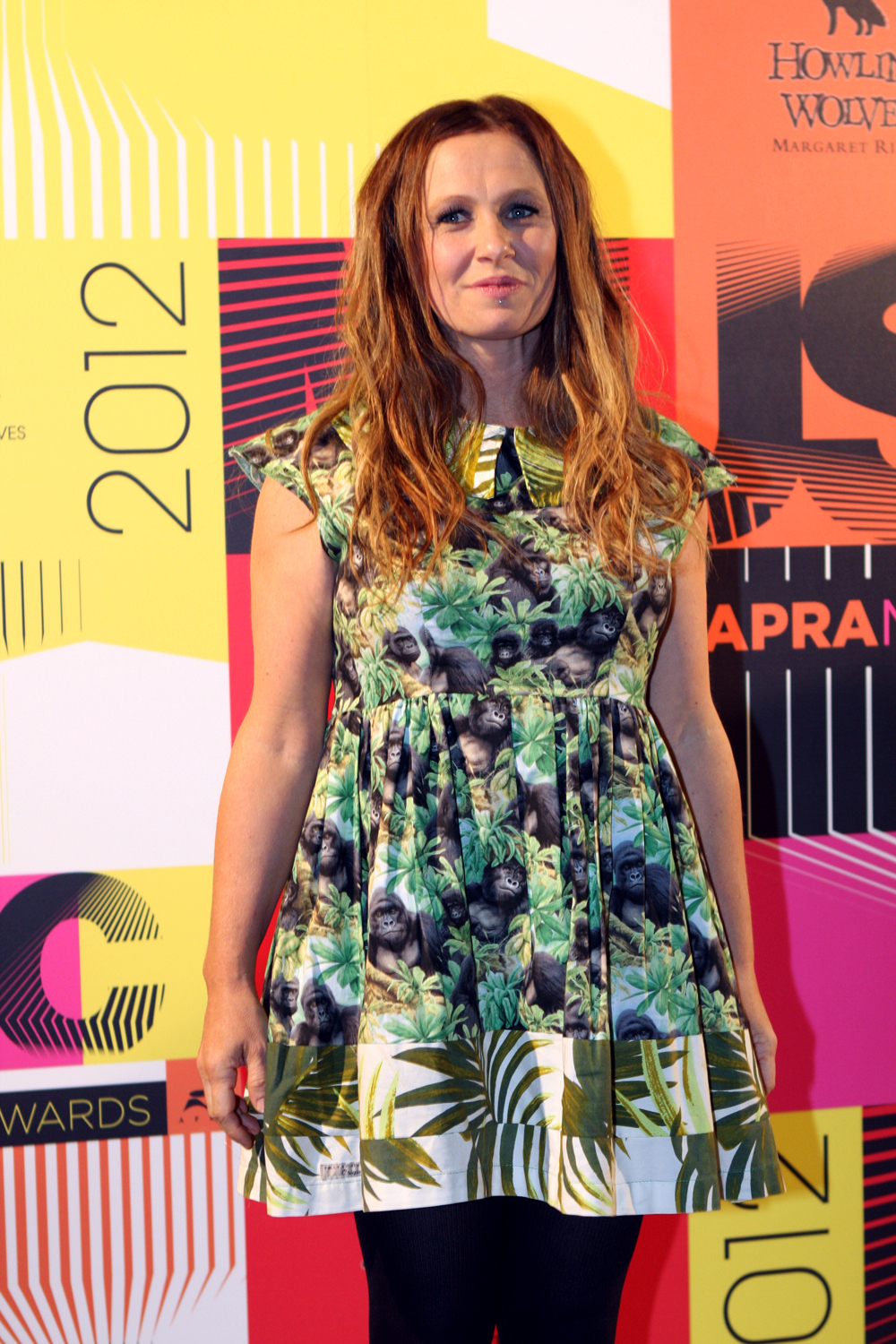
- Chambers in May 2012
Awards and nominations
Award	Wins	Nominations
ARIA Awards	14	33
APRA Awards	10	27
CMAA Awards Country Music Awards	24	
Mo Awards Entertainment industry awards	2	2

Totals (Note: Certain award groups do not simply award one winner. They acknowledge several different recipients, have runners-up, and have third place. Since this is a specific recognition and is different from losing an award, runner-up mentions are considered wins in this award tally. For simplification and to avoid errors, each award in this list has been presumed to have had a prior nomination.)
- Wins: 32
- Nominations: 74

Kasey Chambers is an Australian country music singer-songwriter who started her solo career in 1998 and released her first recording in 1999. Chambers has released twelve studio albums, The Captain (1999), Barricades & Brickwalls (2001), Wayward Angel (2004), Carnival (2006), Rattlin' Bones (2008), Kasey Chambers, Poppa Bill and the Little Hillbillies (2009), Little Bird (2010), Storybook (2011), Wreck & Ruin (2012), Bittersweet (2014), Dragonfly (2017) and Campfire (2018).

Chambers has won and been nominated for numerous music awards. They include fourteen Australian Recording Industry Association (ARIA) Awards and ten Australasian Performing Right Association (APRA) Awards. She was inducted into the ARIA Hall of Fame in 2018. This induction recognised her achievement of a "significant body of recorded work" and that she "has had a cultural impact within Australia". Chambers has also won awards in the country music field with nine from the Country Music Association of Australia (CMAA).

== Awards ==
=== AIR Awards ===
The Australian Independent Record Awards (commonly known informally as AIR Awards) is an annual awards night to recognise, promote and celebrate the success of Australia's Independent Music sector.

Year	Nominee / work	Award	Result	Ref.
2010	Kasey Chambers, Poppa Bill and the Little Hillbillies	Best Independent Country Album	Won	
2011	Little Bird	Best Independent Artist	Nominated	
2025	Backbone	Best Independent Country Album or EP	Won	
2025	Rosemary Whatmuff for "Backbone (The Desert Child)"	Independent Music Video of the Year	Nominated	

=== APRA Music Awards ===
These awards were established by Australasian Performing Right Association (APRA) in 1982 to honour the achievements of songwriters and music composers, and to recognise their song writing skills, sales and airplay performance, by its members annually. Since 1997 the association has formed an alliance with Australasian Mechanical Copyright Owners Society (AMCOS), which manages mechanical royalties, to present the awards. Kasey Chambers has won 10 APRA Music Awards out of 27 nominations.

Year	Nominee / work	Award	Result
2000	"Cry Like a Baby" (Kasey Chambers)	Most Performed Country Work	Nominated
2000	"Cry Like a Baby" (Kasey Chambers)	Song of the Year	Nominated
2001	"The Captain" (Chambers)	Most Performed Country Work	Won
2001	"The Captain" (Chambers)	Song of the Year	Nominated
2002	Kasey Chambers	Songwriter of the Year	Won
2002	"On a Bad Day" (Chambers)	Most Performed Country Work	Nominated
2002	"On a Bad Day" (Chambers)	Song of the Year	Nominated
2002	"Runaway Train" (Chambers, Steven Werchon)	Most Performed Country Work	Nominated
2002	"Runaway Train" (Chambers, Steven Werchon)	Song of the Year	Nominated
2003	"Not Pretty Enough" (Chambers)	Most Performed Australian Work	Won
2003	"Not Pretty Enough" (Chambers)	Most Performed Country Work	Won
2003	"Not Pretty Enough" (Chambers)	Song of the Year	Won
2003	"A Million Tears" (Chambers)	Most Performed Country Work	Nominated
2003	"If I Were You" (Chambers)	Most Performed Country Work	Nominated
2005	"Hollywood" (Chambers)	Most Performed Country Work	Nominated
2005	"Like a River" (Chambers)	Most Performed Country Work	Won
2006	"Hollywood" (Chambers)	Most Performed Country Work	Nominated
2006	"Pony" (Chambers)	Most Performed Country Work	Won
2006	"Saturated" (Chambers)	Most Performed Country Work	Nominated
2007	"Nothing at All" (Chambers)	Most Performed Country Work	Won
2009	"Rattlin' Bones" (Chambers, Shane Nicholson	Country Work of the Year	Won
2009	"Rattlin' Bones" (Chambers, Shane Nicholson	Song of the Year	Nominated
2011	"Little Bird" (Chambers)	Country Work of the Year	Won
2011	"Little Bird" (Chambers)	Song of the Year	Nominated
2012	"Beautiful Mess" (Chambers)	Country Work of the Year	Nominated
2012	"Beautiful Mess" (Chambers)	Song of the Year	Shortlisted
2013	"Adam and Eve" (Kasey Chambers and Shane Nicholson)	Song of the Year	Shortlisted
2013	"The Quiet Life" (Kasey Chambers and Shane Nicholson)	Song of the Year	Shortlisted
2015	"Bittersweet" (Chambers, Bernard Fanning)	Song of the Year	Nominated
2016	"Is God Real?" (Chambers)	Country Work of the Year	Nominated
2019	"The Campfire Song" (Chambers)	Country Work of the Year	Nominated
2021	"When We're Both Old and Mad" (Paul Kelly & Kasey Chambers)	Song of the Year	Shortlisted
2025	"Backbone (The Desert Child)"	Song of the Year	Shortlisted

=== ARIA Music Awards ===
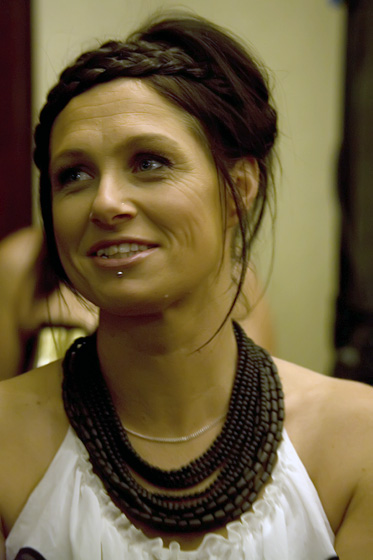
Chambers at the ARIA Hall of Fame, July 2008

These awards have been presented by the Australian Record Industry Association (ARIA) since 1987. Kasey Chambers has won 14 ARIA Music Awards from 33 nominations, including her first win in 1999 for the Best Country Album for The Captain. As from November 2018, she has won that category nine times, she was also inducted into the ARIA Hall of Fame.

Year	Nominee / work	Award	Result
1999	The Captain	Best Country Album	Won
1999	The Captain	Best Female Artist	Nominated
2000	"The Captain"	Best Female Artist	Won
2000	"The Captain"	Single of the Year	Nominated
2002	Barricades & Brickwalls	Album of the Year	Won
2002	Barricades & Brickwalls	Best Country Album	Won
2002	Barricades & Brickwalls	Best Female Artist	Won
2002	Barricades & Brickwalls	Highest Selling Album	Nominated
2002	Barricades & Brickwalls – Campbell Murray Creating	Best Cover Art	Nominated
2002	"Not Pretty Enough"	Highest Selling Single	Nominated
2002	"Not Pretty Enough"	Single of the Year	Nominated
2003	Barricades & Brickwalls	Highest Selling Album	Nominated
2004	Wayward Angel	Album of the Year	Nominated
2004	Wayward Angel	Best Country Album	Won
2004	Wayward Angel	Best Female Artist	Won
2004	Wayward Angel – Mathematics	Best Cover Art	Nominated
2006	"Nothing at All"	Best Female Artist	Nominated
2007	Carnival	Best Female Artist	Nominated
2007	Carnival – Nash Chambers	Producer of the Year	Nominated
2008	Rattlin' Bones (by Kasey Chambers & Shane Nicholson)	Album of the Year	Nominated
2008	Rattlin' Bones (by Kasey Chambers & Shane Nicholson)	Best Country Album	Won
2008	Rattlin' Bones (by Kasey Chambers & Shane Nicholson) – Aaron Hayward & David Homer (Debaser)	Best Cover Art	Nominated
2009	Rattlin' Bones Max Sessions (by Kasey Chambers & Shane Nicholson)	Best Music DVD	Nominated
2010	Kasey Chambers, Poppa Bill and the Little Hillbillies (by Kasey Chambers, Poppa Bill and other family members)	Best Children's Album	Nominated
2011	Little Bird	Best Country Album	Won
2011	Little Bird	Best Female Artist	Nominated
2013	Wreck & Ruin (by Kasey Chambers & Shane Nicholson)	Best Country Album	Won
2013	Wreck & Ruin (by Kasey Chambers & Shane Nicholson) – Glen Hannah	Best Cover Artist	Nominated
2014	Bittersweet	Best Country Album	Won
2014	Bittersweet	Best Female Artist	Nominated
2017	Dragonfly	Best Country Album	Won
2018	Kasey Chambers	ARIA Hall of Fame	inductee
2018	Campfire	Best Country Album	Won
2025	Backbone	Best Country Album	Won

=== Australian Women in Music Awards ===
The Australian Women in Music Awards is an annual event that celebrates outstanding women in the Australian Music Industry who have made significant and lasting contributions in their chosen field. They commenced in 2018.

Year	Nominee / work	Award	Result	Ref.
2024	Kasey Chambers	Lifetime Achievement Award	Won	
2024	Kasey Chambers	Artistic Excellence Award	Nominated	

=== Country Music Awards of Australia ===
The Country Music Awards of Australia (CMAA) (also known as the Golden Guitar Awards) is an annual awards night held in January during the Tamworth Country Music Festival, in Tamworth, New South Wales, celebrating recording excellence in the Australian country music industry. Chambers has won twenty-eight awards.

Year	Nominee / work	Award	Result [wins only]
2000	The Captain	Album of the Year	Won
2000	The Captain	Female Vocalist of the Year	Won
2002	"Not Pretty Enough"	Song of the Year	Won
2002	Barricades & Brickwalls	Top Selling Album of the Year	Won
2003	herself	Golden Guitar Winner of the Decade	Won
2005	"Pony"	Female Vocalist of the Year	Won
2005	"Like a River"	Single of the Year	Won
2005	Wayward Angel	Top Selling Album of the Year	Won
2006	"Pony"	Single of the Year	Won
2009	"Rattlin' Bones" (with Shane Nicholson)	Song of the Year	Won
2009	"Rattlin' Bones" (with Shane Nicholson)	Single of the Year	Won
2009	"Rattlin' Bones" (with Shane Nicholson)	Video Clip of the Year	Won
2009	Rattlin' Bones (with Shane Nicholson)	Highest Selling Album of the Year	Won
2009	Rattlin' Bones (with Shane Nicholson)	Album of the Year	Won
2011	"Little Bird"	Song of the Year	Won
2011	"Little Bird"	Single of the Year	Won
2011	"Little Bird"	Female Artist of the Year	Won
2011	"Love Like a Hurricane" (with Kevin Bennett)	Vocal Collaboration of the Year	Won
2012	"Millionaires" (with Beccy Cole)	Vocal Collaboration of the Year	Won
2013	"Adam & Eve" (with Shane Nicholson)	Group or Duo of the Year	Won
2015	Bittersweet	Album of the Year	Won
2017	"F U Cancer" with Catherine Britt, Beccy Cole, Lyn Bowtell, Josh Pyke, Wes Carr and Wendy Matthews)	Vocal Collaboration of the Year	Won
2018	Dragonfly	Alt Country Album of the Year	Won
2018	herself	Australian Roll of Renown	inducted
2019	Campfire	Traditional Country Album of the Year	Won
2026	Backbone	Alt Country Album of the Year	Won
2026	"The Divorce Song" (with Shane Nicholson)	Song of the Year	Won
2026	"The Divorce Song" (with Shane Nicholson)	Single of the Year	Won

=== Mo Awards ===
The Australian Entertainment Mo Awards (commonly known informally as the Mo Awards), were annual Australian entertainment industry awards. They recognise achievements in live entertainment in Australia from 1975 to 2016. Chambers won two awards in that time.

Year	Nominee / work	Award	Result (wins only)
1999	Kasey Chambers	Female Country Entertainer of the Year	Won
2001	Kasey Chambers	Female Country Entertainer of the Year	Won

=== National Live Music Awards ===
The National Live Music Awards (NLMAs) are a broad recognition of Australia's diverse live industry, celebrating the success of the Australian live scene. The awards commenced in 2016.

Year	Nominee / work	Award	Result
2019	Kasey Chambers	Live Country Act of the Year	Won

=== Other awards ===
Year	Award-giving body	Award	Result
2004	Country Music Association Awards	Global Country Artist Award	Won
2009	Americana Music Awards	Best Duo/Group of the Year (Kasey Chambers and Shane Nicholson)	Nominated
2010	Americana Music Awards	Song of the Year ("Rattlin' Bones" – Kasey Chambers and Shane Nicholson)	Nominated
2017	Americana Music Awards	Vanguard Award	Won
