= Bad Machines =

Studio album by Shane Nicholson
- Released: March 2011
- Label: Liberation
- Producer: Shane Nicholson, Nash Chambers

Shane Nicholson chronology
Familiar Ghosts (2008)	Bad Machines (2011)	Wreck & Ruin (2012)

Bad Machines is the fourth studio album from Australian country singer Shane Nicholson, released by Liberation Music in Australia in March 2011. The album peaked at number 29 on the ARIA Charts, becoming Nicholson's first solo album to peak in the top 50. The album spawned the APRA Award-winning song "Famous Last Words", which won Best Country Work at the APRA Music Awards of 2012.

The inspiration for the album's title came after Nicholson read Midnight Express by Billy Hayes and William Hoffer, in which a criminal is likened to a "bad machine". Nicholson said this made him ponder "Are we made a certain way in the beginning or is it conditioning? Are we controlled by an Almighty engineer?".

At the ARIA Music Awards of 2011, the album was nominated for Best Country Album, but lost out to his wife Kasey Chambers' Little Bird, an album he produced.

At the Country Music Awards of Australia in January 2012, the album was nominated for Album of the Year.

== Reception ==
Graham Reid from Elsewhere NZ said the album "covers a lot of territory" and described "Famous Last Words" as "a snappy country-rocker", "The Broken Things" as "a gentle, simple declaration of love", "Fish and Whistle" as "a light gospel-country feel" and "Money for Jam" as "a brooding, almost monotone rocker".

== Track listing ==
No.	Title	Length
1.	"Famous Last Words"	2:08
2.	"Blueberry Pie"	3:09
3.	"Jimmie Rodgers Was a Vampire"	3:42
4.	"Bad Machines"	2:43
5.	"The Broken Things"	3:20
6.	"Fish and Whistle"	2:35
7.	"Everywhere You Go"	3:43
8.	"Money for Jam"	4:08
9.	"Whistling Cannonballs" (featuring Paul Kelly)	2:55
10.	"Hammer and Nail"	2:42
11.	"Not You, Again"	3:16
12.	"Trick Knee Blues"	2:32
13.	"Music Is Dead"	2:46

== Charts ==
=== Weekly charts ===
Chart (2011)	Peak Position
Australian Albums (ARIA)	29

=== Year-end charts ===
Chart (2011)	Position
Australian Country Albums Chart	43

== Release history ==
Country	Date	Format	Label	Catalogue
Australia	March 2011	CD; Digital download	Liberation Records	LMCD0127
