= Love and Blood (album) =

Studio album by Shane Nicholson
- Released: 28 July 2017
- Label: Lost Highway Australia, Universal
- Producer: Shane Nicholson, Matt Fell

Shane Nicholson chronology
Hell Breaks Loose (2015)	Love and Blood (2017)	Living in Colour (2021)

Love and Blood is the eighth studio album from Australian country singer Shane Nicholson, released on Lost Highway Australia, Universal in July 2017. The album peaked at number 28 on the ARIA Charts.

Nicholson saw the album as a summation of where he is now. He said "I noticed that what changes isn't so much the subject matter, it's your perspective as you get older and write from different points of view with a different mindset. It's been interesting watching that evolve; my take on one subject is different than it may have been twenty years ago when I first started releasing records." Nicholson also said this album feels like a sequel to Hell Breaks Loose, released in 2015 and written amongst the wreckage of his eight-year marriage to Kasey Chambers.

At the ARIA Music Awards of 2017, the album was nominated for Best Country Album.

At the Country Music Awards of Australia in January 2018, the album was nominated for Alternative Country Album of the Year. Nicholson won Male Artist of the Year at the same awards.

== Reception ==
In a positive review, Musicologist Bernard Zuel said "It's partly in the music which straddles rock, country and a kind of soul that is stripped of groove but not feeling... It's partly in the sound which is smooth enough to fit in with classic radio tones of the FM years... [but] most of all it's in an intensity of emotion and sombreness of storytelling here that at least asks to be taken seriously as something more than a batch of songs to make you feel happy/sad/moved to beers."

Denise Hylands from Stack Magazine said "The always sincerely personal Nicholson shares his current matters of the heart with an uplifting determination of love and hope."

== Track listing ==
No.	Title	Length
1.	"Safe"	3:00
2.	"Driving Me Mad"	2:29
3.	"One Trick Pony" (featuring Buddy Miller)	2:41
4.	"Bad Apple"	2:38
5.	"God's Own Army"	2:38
6.	"Hotel Radio"	2:54
7.	"I Don't Dance"	2:45
8.	"Someone's Gonna Pay"	3:30
9.	"Busted Lip"	3:26
10.	"Song for a Sad Girl"	2:45
11.	"Even If You Were the One"	3:47
12.	"All I Know"	3:15

== Charts ==
Chart (2017)	Peak Position
Australian Albums (ARIA)	28

== Release history ==
Country	Date	Format	Label	Catalogue
Australia	28 July 2017	CD; Digital download; LP; streaming	Lost Highway Australia, Universal	5772093
