= Hell Breaks Loose (album) =

Studio album by Shane Nicholson
- Released: 7 August 2015
- Length: 45:09
- Label: Lost Highway Australia, Universal
- Producer: Shane Nicholson, Matt Fell

Shane Nicholson chronology
Pitch, Roll & Yaw - Live and Solo (2014)	Hell Breaks Loose (2015)	Love and Blood (2017)

Hell Breaks Loose is the seventh studio album from Australian country singer Shane Nicholson, released on Lost Highway Australia, Universal in August 2015. It is the first album of new material since Nicholson's marriage break-up with Kasey Chambers in 2013. The album peaked at number 16 on the ARIA Charts.

Upon release, the album was described by Country Music Channel as Nicholson's most personal collection with Nicholson saying "Many of these songs are about self-discovery and new horizons, and also how that's not always great, it can also sometimes be difficult. You can veer down a few wrong paths. It can take time to adjust." Nicholson later added "I don't feel compelled to prove anything. I know with Hell Breaks Loose we came up with something that I loved. That's all that has ever mattered to me, really. The weight on your shoulders certainly feels greater when you are younger, and these days I'm just happy to be doing what I do, the way I like to do it."

At the ARIA Music Awards of 2015, the album was won the ARIA Award for Best Country Album.

At the Country Music Awards of Australia in January 2016, the album won the award for Alternative Country Album of the Year.

== Background and recording ==
In mid-2013 Nicholson announced he had separated from wife of eight years, Kasey Chambers, with whom he shares son Arlon and daughter Poet, and had released two ARIA award winning albums. The normally prolific songwriter then entered a dry spell of almost a year. At the invitation of his friend and indigenous songwriter Warren H Williams, Nicholson travelled to the remote town of Hermannsburg, north-west of Alice Springs. Nicholson said "I had things on the boil during that time but I wasn't properly writing. It was a product of my environment though." Nicholson was producing albums for other people "I was just making record after record, back to back, for other people [and] after [a] 14-hour sessions in the studio you just don't come home and write songs." Nicholson said the vastness of the landscapes around Hermannsberg gave Nicholson the distance, both physical and figurative, to pick up his guitar to write. "What I got out there, there was this sense of perspective and being removed from my bubble." Nicholson said the distance is what he "needed", saying "it was the catalyst for the record coming to life."

== Reception ==
Professional ratings
Review scores
Source	Rating
The Music AU	3.5/5 stars

Chris Familton from The Music AU discussed the songs personal reflection with traumatic experience, geographical locations and depression saying "Heavy subject matter abounds yet Nicholson applies a wonderfully light musical touch with plenty of acoustic guitar, piano and shuffling drums. Melodies dance and dive across the 13 songs whose folk and country hooks, with time, dig in deep." Country Music Channel called the album "wonderful".

== Track listing ==
No.	Title	Length
1.	"Weight of the World"	2:30
2.	"Hell Breaks Loose"	3:25
3.	"When the Money's All Gone"	3:56
4.	"Slow Coach"	2:30
5.	"Irons & Chains"	2:10
6.	"One Big Mess"	3:34
7.	"Secondhand Man"	4:10
8.	"Hermannsburg"	3:17
9.	"Bury My Guns"	2:27
10.	"Single Fathers"	2:56
11.	"Far Cry"	3:09
12.	"You and Whose Army?"	2:44
13.	"Eyes on the Prize"	2:47
14.	"In Favour of the House" (bonus track)	2:52
15.	"I Ain't Had Your Love" (bonus track)	2:42

== Charts ==
=== Weekly charts ===
Chart (2015)	Peak Position
Australian Albums (ARIA)	16

=== Year-end charts ===
Chart (2015)	Position
Australian Country Albums Chart	48

== Release history ==
Country	Date	Format	Label	Catalogue
Various	7 August 2015	CD; Digital download; streaming	Lost Highway Australia, Universal	4745547
Australia	14 August 2015	LP	Lost Highway Australia, Universal	4742475
