= The Divorce Song =

Single by Kasey Chambers featuring Shane Nicholson

from the album Backbone
- Released: January 2025
- Length: 2:58
- Label: Essence
- Songwriters: Kasey Chambers & Shane Nicholson
- Producers: Kasey Chambers, Shane Nicholson, Nash Chambers

Kasey Chambers singles chronology
"A Love Like Springsteen" (2024)	"The Divorce Song" (2025)

Shane Nicholson singles chronology
"Sometimes" (2023)	"The Divorce Song" (2025)

"The Divorce Song" is a country song written and performed by Kasey Chambers and Shane Nicholson and released in January 2025 as the third and final single from Chamber's thirteenth studio album, Backbone.

At the 2026 Country Music Awards of Australia , the song won Song of the Year and Single of the Year. During an acceptance speech, Chambers said "I think if we'd known that divorce was such a career move, we would have done it sooner." It was also nominated for Music video and Vocal collaboration of the Year at the same awards.

== Background and release ==
Chambers and Nicholson married in 2005 and have two children together. In 2008, Chambers and Nicholson released their first collaboration album Rattlin' Bones. It debuted at number one on the ARIA Albums Chart, was certified platinum, and won the couple five Golden Guitars at the 2009 Country Music Awards of Australia and the ARIA Award for Best Country Album in 2008. In 2012, the two released their second collaborative album, Wreck & Ruin. It won the ARIA Award for Best Country Album in 2013. The couple separated in 2013 and have not written a song together until "The Divorce Song".

Upon release, Chambers said, "Writing 'The Divorce Song' with my ex-husband Shane Nicholson and then recording it together as a duet is one of my favourite musical moments of my career and even more, one of my proudest family moments. Honestly, when our marriage ended I never thought Shane and I would ever write another song together again but I guess if you work hard enough on making a divorce really work, then anything can happen." Nicholson added, "For a long while, writing and recording together again wasn't looking likely for Kasey and I, and 'The Divorce Song' seems like the perfect way to revisit what we always did best together. Only an hour to put down on paper, but in reality it took us 10 years to write this song."

== Music video ==
The music video for the song was filmed and edited by Gabe Coggan and released in January 2025.

== Reception ==
As part of the album review, Brett Leigh Dicks from Xpress Mag said "As a lyricist, Chambers has never shied away from wearing her heart on her sleeve, and nowhere is this more apparent than within 'The Divorce Song'. A Johnny and June Cash-style duet with former partner Shane Nicholson, the song is crammed with lyrical treasures, ranging from gems like 'If I wasted most of my best years, I'm glad they were wasted with you' to 'We said till death do us part, but death didn't come quick enough.'"

Pace Proctor from The AU Review said "'The Divorce Song' is a super fun addition that proves Chambers and co. don't take themselves too seriously. The addition of the studio musicians laughing through a mistake is a perfect introduction to a tongue in cheek tune that suggests 'We couldn’t survive as the marrying kind / but we do divorce pretty good'".
