= Cry Like a Baby (Kasey Chambers song) =

Single by Kasey Chambers

from the album The Captain
- Released: February 1999
- Recorded: 1998
- Genre: Country
- Length: 4:02
- Label: EMI Music Australia
- Songwriter: Kasey Chambers
- Producer: Nash Chambers

Kasey Chambers singles chronology
"Cry Like a Baby" (1999)	"Don't Talk Back" (1999)

"Cry Like a Baby" is a country song written and performed and written by Kasey Chambers and produced by her brother, Nash Chambers. It was released in February 1999 as the lead single from her debut studio album, The Captain (1999).

At the APRA Music Awards of 2000, the song was nominated for Song of the Year and Most Performed Country Work.

== Track listing ==
CD single (7243 8 86910 2 4)
No.	Title	Length
1.	"Cry Like a Baby"	4:02
2.	"We're All Gonna Die Someday"	2:09

== Charts ==
Chart performance for "Cry Like a Baby"
Chart (1999)	Peak position
Australia (ARIA)	72
