= JMC Academy =

Entertainment technology academy in Australia

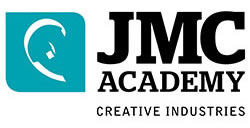
- Other name: JMC
- Type: Private
- Established: 1982
- Academic affiliations: Australian Council of Private Education and Training (ACPET), Berklee International Network
- Chairman: Rod Camm
- Academic staff: 1235
- Administrative staff: 45
- Location: Brisbane; Melbourne; Sydney

JMC Academy (JMC), founded in 1982, is an Australian multi-campus higher-education institution located in New South Wales, Victoria and Queensland.

JMC is recognised as a quality tertiary education provider by the Australian Government's Tertiary Education Quality & Standards Agency (TEQSA) and the Australian Skills Quality Authority (ASQA).

In 2013, JMC was awarded the Higher Education Provider of the Year by the Australian Council for Private Education and Training (ACPET). In the same year, JMC Academy became the only Australian institution to join the Berklee College of Music's International Network.

== History ==
JMC Academy was established in 1982. The first campus was located in Sydney. It became the first private college to qualify for Audio Engineering, Digital Television and Digital Multimedia accreditation.

In 1988 JMC Academy was approved to accept international students. JMC then received accreditation in Audio Engineering, making JMC Academy Australia's first institution to offer accredited digital multimedia courses.

In 1992 JMC received accreditation for Multimedia. In 1994, JMC received accreditation in Music Business Management.

In 1997, JMC received accreditation for Popular Music & Performance before becoming Australia's first institution to offer accredited Digital TV courses when they received accreditation in Digital Television Production in 2000. In 2001, JMC opened the Melbourne Campus. In 2005, the Sydney campus received approval to deliver Higher Education courses, followed by the South Melbourne campus in 2006. JMC's South Brisbane campus then opened in 2007 receiving approval to deliver Higher Education courses the following year.

2012 saw JMC launch a Game Design course. In 2013, JMC became a Berklee College of Music partner and won the ACPET Awards for ‘Higher Education Provider of the Year’ & ‘Teacher of the Year’.

JMC's Digital Design & Songwriting courses launched in 2014, followed by the launch of the APRA AMCOS Scholarship in 2016. 2018 saw the launch of JMC's Master of Creative Industries course, and a new 8-floor campus opens in Brisbane.

== Campus ==
JMC has three campuses across Australia.

=== Sydney Campus ===
Located within the education hub of Central Sydney. The office of Study Anywhere is located on the same street.

=== Brisbane Campus ===
The Brisbane campus is located adjacent to the Queensland State Library, Art Gallery, Museum and Performing Arts Centre.

=== Melbourne Campus ===
The campus is located in South Melbourne between the south bank of the Yarra River and Port Phillip Bay.

== Accreditation ==
- Registered Higher Education Provider
- Accredited by the Tertiary Education Quality and Standards Agency (TEQSA)
- Accredited by the Australian Skills Quality Authority (ASQA)
- Registered on the Commonwealth Register of Institutions and Courses for Overseas Students (CRICOS)
- Member of the Australian Council of Private Education and Training (ACPET)
- Nationally recognised under the Australian Qualifications Framework

== Notable alumni ==
- Jess Dunbar and Matt Price – Australian singing duo
- Tim Omaji – Australian singer-songwriter and dancer
- Nicole Paparistodemou – Greek singer
- Camille Trail – Australian country musician
- Monica Strut - Music Journalist and Singer

== Notable staff ==
- Lachlan Goold – 2-time ARIA Music Awards winner & Audio Engineer
- Richard Grossman – Music performance trainer and two-time ARIA Music Awards winner
