= Backbone (Kasey Chambers album) =

Studio album by Kasey Chambers
- Released: 4 October 2024
- Recorded: The Rabbit Hole (Central Coast)
- Genres: Country; Americana
- Length: 62:59
- Label: Essence
- Producer: Kasey Chambers

Kasey Chambers chronology
Campfire (2018)	Backbone (2024)

Singles from Backbone
- 1. "Backbone (The Desert Child)" Released: 30 July 2024; 2. "A Love Like Springsteen" Released: 4 October 2024; 3. "The Divorce Song" Released: January 2025

Backbone is the thirteenth studio album by Australian singer-songwriter Kasey Chambers. The album was released on 4 October 2024. It was announced on 30 July 2024 alongside the release of its lead single.

Upon announcement, Chambers said: "Good and bad, this album is who I am. I worked with my favourite musicians, and I sang about every beautiful, joyous, embarrassing and tough thing I've gone through. Everything that's gone into making me this person." The album is inspired by material from Chambers' book Just Don't Be a Dickhead, scheduled for release on 1 October 2024.

In September 2024, Chambers announced the Backbone 2025 tour dates across Australia from January to June.

At the AIR Awards of 2025, the album was nominated for Best Independent Country Album or EP. At the 2025 ARIA Music Awards, the album won Best Country Album.

At the 2026 Country Music Awards of Australia, the album was nominated for Album of the Year and Alt. Country Album of the Year. It won Alt. Country Album of the Year

== Track listing ==
All tracks are written by Kasey Chambers, except where noted.

Backbone track listing
No.	Title	Writer(s)	Length
0.	Untitled		3:25
1.	"A New Day Has Come"		5:22
2.	"Backbone (The Desert Child)"		3:32
3.	"A Love Like Springsteen"	Chambers; Brandon Dodd	3:40
4.	"Dart n Feather"		4:42
5.	"For Better or Worse"	Chambers; Dodd	4:18
6.	"Little Red Riding Hood"		4:35
7.	"Silverado Girl"		3:50
8.	"The Divorce Song" (featuring Shane Nicholson)	Chambers; Shane Nicholson	2:58
9.	"Arlo"
10.	"Broken Cup"		3:14
11.	"My Kingdom Come" (featuring Ondara)	Chambers; Dodd	3:30
12.	"Something to Believe In"		4:11
13.	"Take Me Down the Mountain"		4:07
14.	"You Are Everything to Me"		3:20
15.	"Lose Yourself" (live at Newcastle Civic Theatre)	Jeff Bass; Luis Resto; Marshall Mathers	8:15

== Personnel ==
=== Musicians ===
- Kasey Chambers – acoustic guitar, banjo, vocals
- Brady Blade – drums, percussion, backing vocals
- Jeff McCormack – bass guitar, backing vocals
- Sam Teskey – electric guitar, slide guitar, acoustic guitar, backing vocals
- Brandon Dodd – electric guitar, baritone guitar, acoustic guitar, banjo, harmony vocals
- Bill Chambers – Dobro, mandolin, harmony vocals, lap steel on "Lose Yourself"
- Nash Chambers – harmony vocals
- Mick Albeck – fiddle
- Ian Perez – keyboards, organ
- Alexandra D'Elia – violin
- Adrian Walls – cello
- Shane Nicholson – guest vocals and acoustic guitar on "The Divorce Song"
- Ondara – guest vocals on "My Kingdom Come"
- Syd Green – drums on "Lose Yourself"

=== Technical ===
- Kasey Chambers – production
- Dingo Music Productions – co-production, engineering assistance
- Jeff McCormack – mastering, engineering
- Nash Chambers – mixing

=== Visuals ===
- Chloe Isaac – cover photo
- Gabriel Coggan – inside photos
- Dave Homer – artwork

== Charts ==
Chart performance for Backbone
Chart (2024)	Peak position
Australian Albums (ARIA)	3
Australian Country Albums (ARIA)	1
