= Ain't No Little Girl =

EP by Kasey Chambers
- Released: 26 August 2016
- Genre: Country
- Label: Warner Music Australia
- Producers: Paul Kelly, Nash Chambers

Kasey Chambers chronology
Bittersweet (2014)	Ain't No Little Girl (2016)	Dragonfly (2017)

Ain't No Little Girl is a 2016 extended play (EP) by Australian country singer Kasey Chambers. Three of the four tracks from the EP also appear on Chambers' 2017 album, Dragonfly.

The title track of the EP is intended as the answer to the question posed by her 2002 number one single "Not Pretty Enough". Chambers said: "The song has all my insecurities and vulnerability and broken hearts in there and I still don't know what the f... I am doing half the time but now I also have strength."

Elsewhere, Chambers said, "It's the first song in my life I truly feel 'wrote me' rather than me writing it. I wrote it a few years back and never connected to it much because I honestly felt like I wasn't strong enough personally or vocally to really 'own it.' I grew into the song throughout a lot of personal growth and after vocal surgery having two nodules removed from my vocal cords, I found a new strength and power within myself as a singer and a woman. It became a theme to new life, and I feel is the most important song I've ever written."

At the 2017 Country Music Awards of Australia, the title track was nominated for Song of the Year, Single of the Year and Video Clip of the Year.

== Critical reception ==
Daniel Patrin from Renowned for Sound gave the extended play 4 out of 5, saying: "It's a well-thought sampler of hand plucked Aussie country jams, even featuring a track with Keith Urban. The EP covers many different moods in its short time, doing well to encapsulate feelings of modernism with a classic country appeal." He called the EP "a golden nugget of outback goodness proving to be that of essential 2016 listening. It showcases Kasey's confident musical headspace of today while maintaining a thorough country music backbone."

== Track listing ==
- Digital download
1. "Ain't No Little Girl" – 4:16
2. "If We Had a Child" (with Keith Urban) – 3:39
3. "Only Child" – 2:53
4. "Talkin' Baby Blues" – 4:31

== Charts ==
Chart (2016)	Peak position
Australia (ARIA)	99

== Release history ==
Region	Date	Format(s)	Label	Catalogue
Australia	26 August 2016	Digital download, CD	Warner Music Australia	5419731382
