= Camille Trail =

- Born: 13 October 1998 (age 26); Baralaba, Queensland, Australia
- Genres: Indie; folk
- Instruments: Vocals; piano; guitar
- Labels: Compass Bros / Universal
- Website: camilletrail.com

Camille Trail (born 1998) is an Australian indie folk musician from Baralaba, Queensland. She released her latest single Gotta Get To Know You August 11, produced by Garret Kato. She released her debut album, River of Sins, in August 2021.

== Career ==
Camille Trail was born in 1998 in Baralaba, Queensland, and began learning piano aged 8. She performed her first gig at the Baralaba Hotel, aged 14. After high school she studied music at JMC Academy in Brisbane, and began writing her debut album.

After sending demos to country musician-producer, Shane Nicholson, they recorded together across six weeks in February 2019, with Nicholson featuring on vocals for a track. Trail released her first single, "Humming Chain", in that year. To pay Nicholson, Trail sold two bulls from her family's cattle station, Murrindindi. The recording sessions were used as her final university assessment and became her debut album, River of Sins, which was released in 2021. It peaked at No. 5 on the ARIA Australian Artist Country Albums chart. Gareth Bryant of scenstr.com.au felt Trail has an "innate ability to weave blues, gospel and folk into her alt. country, Americana soundscapes, creating poignant snapshots of vulnerability soaked in the human spirit."

In 2021 she was nominated for New Talent of the Year at the 50th annual Golden Guitar Awards, and in 2022 her single, "I Know I'm Hard to Love" was nominated for the Country Award at the Queensland Music Awards.

She released her latest single 'Gotta Get To Know You' on August 11, produced by Indie/Folk Singer Songwriter and Producer Garret Kato. The new release is the first of Trail's shift to the indie folk genre.

== Discography ==
=== Studio albums ===
Title	Album details	Peak chart positions
Title	Album details	AUS Country
River of Sins	Released: 7 August 2021; Label: Compass Bros / Universal Music Australia; Formats: CD	5

=== Singles ===
Title	Details	Peak chart positions
Title	Details	AUS
'Humming Chain"	Released: 2019; Label: Self released; Format: Digital	
"Devil's Drink"	Released: 2020; Label: Compass Bros Records; Format: Digital	
"Little History"	Released: 2020; Label: Compass Bros Records; Format: Digital	
"Holding Pattern" (featuring Brad Butcher)	Released: 2021; Label: Compass Bros Records; Format: Digital	
"I Know I'm Hard to Love"	Released: 2021; Label: Compass Bros Records; Format: Digital	
"I Don't Like You"	Released: 2021; Label: Compass Bros Records; Format: Digital	

== Awards ==
=== Country Music Awards (CMAA) ===
Year	Nominee / work	Award	Result
2021	Herself	New Talent of the Year	Nominated

=== Queensland Music Awards ===
Year	Nominee / work	Award	Result
2022	"I Know I'm Hard to Love"	Country Award	Nominated
