= Living in Colour =

Studio album by Shane Nicholson
- Released: 20 August 2021
- Label: Lost Highway Australia, Universal

Shane Nicholson chronology
Love and Blood (2017)	Living in Colour (2021)

Singles from Living in Colour
- 1. "Harvest On Vinyl" Released: 18 March 2021; 2. "Life Ain't Fine" Released: 21 June 2021; 3. "And You Will Have Your Way"" Released: 9 July 2021

Living in Colour is the ninth studio album from Australian country singer Shane Nicholson, released on Lost Highway Australia, Universal in August 2021. The album was written and recorded in a studio on the Central Coast (New South Wales) by Nicholson alone due to the ongoing COVID restrictions, while balancing life and producing several other artist's projects at the same time. Nicholson said "I haven't really done that since then, being able to sit there by myself and pick up instrument after instrument. It was mostly me and a bottle of whiskey into the night, that was it." The album peaked at number 68 on the ARIA Charts.

The album was announced in July 2021 alongside the album's third single "And You Will Have Your Way" with Nicholson saying "In my 20s the world seemed basically full of possibilities. I had this idea that there were elders to me that were learned, educated people, intelligent people and they took care of everything. Then my 30s came along and I had kids. I started thinking about what the world would be like for them. By the time my 40s arrived my old world-view had almost completely fallen apart, and I had reached peak cynicism."

Nicholson supported the album with the Australian Living in Colour tour, due to run from 20 August to 4 December 2021. These date were later delayed and are expected from 8 October 2021 to 12 February 2022.

At the 2021 ARIA Music Awards, the album was nominated for Best Country Album.

At the 2022 Country Music Awards of Australia, the album won Album of the Year and Alt. Country Album of the Year.

== Reception ==
Jeff Jenkins from Stack Magazine said "More than two decades after his first release, Nicholson is doing his finest work. Living in Colour is both a celebration of music and a lament for a world gone crazy." Jenkins concluded saying "The world needs more songwriters like him."

Beat Magazine said "A rare talent who has bridged the gap between alt-country and the mainstream, this album captures Nicholson's charismatic talent for writing striking songs that pay tribute to the unpredictability of human experience, with the ability to wrap up difficult subject matters with music of uplifting beauty and charm."

== Track listing ==
No.	Title	Length
1.	"And You Will Have Your Way"	3:00
2.	"Helena"	3:33
3.	"House Burns Down"	2:52
4.	"Simple Man"	2:44
5.	"Harvest On Vinyl"	3:35
6.	"The High Price of Surviving"	2:37
7.	"How to Write a Song"	2:48
8.	"Life Ain't Fine"	2:27
9.	"High Horse"	3:23
10.	"A Million Angels"	3:46
11.	"Ain't Been Loved"	3:10
12.	"Where in the World"	2:18
13.	"This Is War"	3:02

== Charts ==
Chart performance for Living in Colour
Chart (2021)	Peak position
Australian Albums (ARIA)	68

== Release history ==
Country	Date	Format	Label	Catalogue
Australia	20 August 2021	CD; Digital download; LP; streaming	Lost Highway Australia, Universal	3807851
