= Pony (Kasey Chambers song) =

Single by Kasey Chambers

from the album Wayward Angel
- B-side: "Driving with the Brakes On"
- Released: 16 January 2005 (Australia)
- Recorded: 2004
- Genre: Country
- Length: 4:03
- Label: Essence
- Songwriter(s): Kasey Chambers
- Producer(s): Nash Chambers

Kasey Chambers singles chronology
"Hollywood" (2004)	"Pony" (2005)	"Saturated" (2005)

"Pony" is a country song performed and written by Kasey Chambers and produced by her brother, Nash Chambers for her third album Wayward Angel (2004). It was released as the album's second single on 16 January 2005 in Australia as CD single. The song became Chambers' third top ten hit on the ARIA Singles Chart. It references Ralph Stanley, an American folk, bluegrass, and country music artist. At the APRA Music Awards of 2006 "Pony" won Most Performed Country Work.

== Track listing ==
All tracks are written by Kasey Chambers

No.	Title	Length
1.	"Pony"	04:03
2.	"Driving with the Brakes On"	04:53
3.	"Hollywood" (live)	03:36

== Charts ==
=== Weekly charts ===
Chart (2005)	Peak position
Australia (ARIA)	10

=== Year-end charts ===
Chart (2005)	Peak position
Australia Single (ARIA)	78
