= Adam & Eve (song) =

Single by Kasey Chambers and Shane Nicholson

from the album Wreck & Ruin
- Released: 23 July 2012
- Recorded: 2012
- Studio: Foggy Mountain
- Genre: Alternative country
- Length: 3:05
- Label: Bloodlines
- Songwriters: Kasey Chambers & Shane Nicholson
- Producers: Kasey Chambers, Shane Nicholson, Nash Chambers

Kasey Chambers singles chronology
"Luka" (2012)	"Adam & Eve" (2012)	"The Quiet Life" (2012)

Shane Nicholson singles chronology
"Jimmie Rodgers Was a Vampire" (2011)	"Adam & Eve" (2012)	"The Quiet Life" (2012)

"Adam & Eve" is a country song written and performed by Kasey Chambers and Shane Nicholson. It was co-produced by Kasey's brother, Nash and released in July 2012 as the lead single from their pair second collaborative studio album, Wreck & Ruin (2012).

The song is loaded with religious imagery including serpents and sin and storytelling that's part fairytale and Biblical. Nicholson said "There is no symbolic connection between us and Adam and Eve. I don't know if that story ended that well anyway."

Chambers said "Adam and Eve definitely takes a very old traditional type story and puts a modern twist on it, which is I guess what the album is generally. We talked about how that would be a good concept for a song, being that we're husband and wife and can play the parts as actors."

At the Country Music Awards of Australia of 2013, the song was nominated for Song of the Year, Single of the Year and Video of the Year. Chambers and Nicholson won Group or Duo of the Year for this song.

== Music video ==
The music video for "Adam & Eve" was directed by Helen Clemens and released on 7 August 2012. The video tells the tale of outlaws on the run from the law. Kasey and Shane escape through outback purgatory, travelling through barren landscapes and changing climates.

== Reception ==
auspOp said the song sees "Chambers & Nicholson doing what they do best – hamonising beautifully on a simple, stripped back country/folk song."
