= Little Bird (Kasey Chambers album) =

Studio album by Kasey Chambers
- Released: 17 September 2010
- Genre: Country
- Length: 45:50
- Label: Liberation
- Producer: Nash Chambers, Shane Nicholson

Kasey Chambers chronology
Kasey Chambers, Poppa Bill and the Little Hillbillies (2009)	Little Bird (2010)	Storybook (2011)

Singles from Little Bird
- 1. "Little Bird" Released: 20 August 2010; 2. "Beautiful Mess" Released: February 2011

Little Bird is the seventh studio album released by the Australian singer Kasey Chambers, released by Liberation Music in Australia on 17 September 2010. The album peaked at number three on the Australian ARIA Charts, becoming Chambers' first album to miss the number one spot since her debut album, The Captain, peaked at number eleven in 1999.

At the AIR Awards of 2011, the album was nominated for Best Independent Country Album. At the 2011 ARIA Music Awards, the album won Best Country Album.

== Reception ==
Professional ratings
Review scores
Source	Rating
Allmusic	3/5 stars
Slant Magazine	4/5 stars

Music critic Alexey Eremenko, fromAllmusic wrote "Little Bird is more old school, as it peppers the pop hits with honest to God country numbers, complete with banjo and fiddle... With Chambers, the music and the words sometimes tether on the brink of cliché, not archetype. But for the most part, she is still able to deliver her tunes with honesty that makes you think about feelings she's conveying, not her recording budgets, as is the case with many over-processed country stars out there."

== Track listing ==
All tracks are written by Kasey Chambers, with the exception of "Millionaires", which was written by Beccy Cole.

No.	Title	Length
1.	"Someone Like Me"	4:09
2.	"Beautiful Mess"	3:14
3.	"Devil on Your Back"	3:23
4.	"Little Bird"	3:30
5.	"Georgia Brown"	1:45
6.	"Somewhere"	3:47
7.	"This Story"	3:43
8.	"Love Like a Hurricane" (featuring Kevin Bennett)	3:10
9.	"Down Here on Earth"	3:15
10.	"Nullarbor, The Biggest Backyard"	2:24
11.	"Bring Back My Heart"	2:56
12.	"Invisible Girl"	3:19
13.	"Train Wreck"	5:56
14.	"The Stupid Things I Do"	2:00

Deluxe Edition
No.	Title	Length
15.	"Millionaires" (featuring Beccy Cole)	3:50
16.	"Old School"	2:39
17.	"Hold On"	3:43

== Personnel ==
- Kevin Bennett – duet vocals
- Kasey Chambers – vocals
- Beccy Cole – duet vocals
- Shane Nicholson, Jim Mogine and Bill Chambers – guitar, Stringed Instruments.
- John Watson – drums
- Jeff McCormack – bass

== Charts ==
=== Weekly charts ===
Chart (2010–11)	Peak position
Australian Albums (ARIA)	3
US Billboard Top Country Albums	32
US Billboard Top Heatseekers	6
US Billboard Folk Albums	9
US Billboard Independent Albums	39

=== Year-end charts ===
Chart (2010)	Position
Australian Albums Chart	68
Australian Artist Albums Chart	18
Australian Country Albums Chart	6
Chart (2011)	Position
Australian Country Albums Chart	17

== Certifications ==
Region	Certification	Certified units/sales
Australia (ARIA)	Gold	35,000^{^}
^{^} Shipments figures based on certification alone.
