= Bittersweet (Kasey Chambers album) =

Studio album by Kasey Chambers
- Released: 29 August 2014 (Australia)
- Recorded: Australia
- Genre: Country, Pop
- Length: 45:44
- Label: Warner Bros., Sugar Hill
- Producer: Nick DiDia

Kasey Chambers chronology
Wreck & Ruin (2012)	Bittersweet (2014)	Ain't No Little Girl (2016)

Singles from Bittersweet
- 1. "Wheelbarrow" Released: 2014; 2. "Bittersweet" Released: 2014; 3. "Is God Real?" Released: April 2015

Bittersweet is the tenth studio album by Australian singer-songwriter Kasey Chambers. It was released on 29 August 2014 and debuted at No. 2 in Australia, making it her sixth top 5 album in Australia.

It was the first album of Chambers' not to be produced by her brother Nash Chambers. The album was produced instead by Nick DiDia. Kasey says for this record she needed something different: “I wanted to have an experience making a record that I had never had before. I wanted to challenge myself and I wanted to be excited.” DiDia had previously produced albums for Pearl Jam, Rage Against the Machine, Bruce Springsteen, The Wallflowers, The Living End, and Powderfinger.

It is also Chambers' first album since she split from husband Shane Nicholson.

The album won Best Country album at the ARIA Music Awards of 2014 Chambers also received a nomination for Best female artist but lost out to Sia.

Chambers also toured throughout 2014/2015 to support the album.

The album was released in the United States on July 24, 2015 through Sugar Hill Records. She toured the US throughout July and August to support the release.

== Critical reception ==
Chris Familton from The Music AU gave the album 3.5 out of 5, saying: "[The album] finds her canvassing a range of styles and moods, often with religious/biblical references, without sacrificing her heart-on-sleeve emotiveness, innate sense of melody and country heart. Chambers has again come up with a strong batch of songs that give her the opportunity to rewardingly dig into a few vocal corners she hasn’t explored to any great extent on previous albums."

== Track listing ==
No.	Title	Length
1.	"Oh Grace"	4:21
2.	"Is God Real?"	3:52
3.	"Wheelbarrow" (with Ashleigh Dallas)	3:50
4.	"I Would Do"	4:17
5.	"Hell of a Way to Go"	3:39
6.	"House on a Hill"	3:48
7.	"Stalker"	2:42
8.	"Heaven or Hell"	3:03
9.	"Bittersweet" (with Bernard Fanning)	3:59
10.	"Too Late to Save Me"	3:45
11.	"Christmas Day"	4:48
12.	"I'm Alive"	3:50

== Personnel ==
- Bernard Fanning – acoustic guitar, backing vocals, harmonica, keyboards, piano
- Dan Kelly – backing vocals, acoustic guitar, electric guitar
- Kasey Chambers – acoustic guitar, backing vocals, banjo
- Ashleigh Dallas – backing vocals, banjo, fiddle, mandolin
- Matthew Engelbrecht – bass
- Alex Mustakov – design
- Declan Kelly – drums
- Matthew Engelbrecht – flugelhorn
- Steve Smart – mastering
- Nick Didia – mixing
- Declan Kelly – percussion
- Carlotta Moye – photography
- Nick Didia – producer

== Charts ==
=== Weekly charts ===
Bittersweet debuted at No. 2 in Australia on its released in 2014, behind Jimmy Barnes' 30:30 Hindsight. In the US, the album was released in July 2015, and debuted on the Heatseekers Albums chart at No. 24, Folk Albums at No. 23, and Top Country Albums at No. 49, with 800 copies sold in its debut week.

Chart (2014–15)	Peak position
Australian Albums (ARIA)	2
US Top Country Albums (Billboard)	49
US Folk Albums (Billboard)	23
US Heatseekers Albums (Billboard)	24

=== Year-end charts ===
Chart (2014)	Position
Australian Artist Albums Chart	39
Australian Country Albums Chart	4
Chart (2015)	Position
Australian Country Albums Chart	48
