= Storybook (Kasey Chambers album) =

Studio album by Kasey Chambers
- Released: 23 September 2011
- Genres: Folk, Country, World music, Pop
- Label: Liberation / Sugar Hill Records
- Producer: Nash Chambers

Kasey Chambers chronology
Little Bird (2010)	Storybook (2011)	Wreck & Ruin (2012)

Singles from Storybook
- 1. "Luka" Released: 2011

"Storybook" is the eighth studio album by Australian singer-songwriter Kasey Chambers. "Storybook" is a collection of some of Kasey's favourite artists, musicians that have inspired and influenced her throughout her career and acts as a companion to her autobiography, A Little Bird Told Me.

It was released on 23 September 2011 and peaked at No.21 in Australia.

== Review ==
Hal Horowitz from All Music gave the album 3.5 out of 5, saying; "Chambers invests her girlish yet poignant vocals and the playing is consistently excellent. If you are already a fan, it's an agreeable venture, but she's not bringing much new to the table in terms of arrangements or her vocal approach. That doesn't make this any less genuine or heartfelt in terms of Chambers' often poignant commitment; however, it also seems like a missed opportunity to stamp these songs with her own personality by re-imagining them to reveal fresh or previously unrealised sub texts."

Jason Hamad from No Surf Music said; "Lacking any original material, it’s impossible to say that Storybook is a 'can’t miss' album, but for Kasey Chambers fans it has the potential to be extremely informative. Although there are a few misses, with highlights like 'Happy Woman Blues', 'Return of the Grievous Angel', 'Leave the Lights On', 'Guilty', 'Orphan Girl' and 'Too Long in the Wasteland' it’s more than an enjoyable listen."

== Track listing ==
No.	Title	Writer(s)	Original artist	Length
1.	"Happy Woman Blues"	Lucinda Williams	Lucinda Williams	3:25
2.	"Return of the Grievous Angel"	Gram Parsons and Thomas Brown	Gram Parsons	4:23
3.	"If I Needed You" (with Jimmy Barnes)	Townes Van Zandt	Emmylou Harris and Don Williams	2:53
4.	"Luka"	Suzanne Vega	Suzanne Vega	3:35
5.	"Nothing but a Child" (with The Lost Dogs)	Steve Earle	Steve Earle	4:23
6.	"Leave the Lights On"	John Prine	John Prine	2:17
7.	"I'm So Lonesome I Could Cry" (with Paul Kelly)	Hank Williams	Hank Williams	2:34
8.	"Guilty"	Matthew Ryan	Matthew Ryan	5:01
9.	"Orphan Girl" (with Shane Nicholson)	Gillian Welch	Gillian Welch	3:48
10.	"True Colours"	Billy Steinberg and Tom Kelly	Cyndi Lauper	3:45
11.	"Water in the Fuel"	Fred Eaglesmith	Fred Eaglesmith	4:46
12.	"I Wish It Would Rain" (with Ashleigh Dallas)	Nanci Griffith	Nanci Griffith	3:20
13.	"Everything's Turning to White"	Paul Kelly	Paul Kelly	5:47
14.	"Too Long in the Wasteland"	James McMurtry	James McMurtry	4:45
15.	"Top of the World"	Patty Griffin	Patty Griffin	4:58
Total length:				59:40

== Charts ==
=== Weekly charts ===
Chart (2011)	Peak position
Australian Albums (ARIA)	21
US Top Country Albums (Billboard)	53
US Americana/Folk Albums (Billboard)	19
US Heatseekers Albums (Billboard)	16

=== Year-end charts ===
Chart (2011)	Position
Australian Country Albums Chart	13
