= Rattlin' Bones (song) =

Single by Kasey Chambers and Shane Nicholson

from the album Rattlin' Bones
- Released: 2008 (Australia)
- Length: 3:42
- Label: Liberation
- Songwriter(s): Kasey Chambers & Shane Nicholson
- Producer(s): Nash Chambers

Kasey Chambers singles chronology
| "Surrender" (2006) | "Rattlin' Bones" (2008) | "Monkey on a Wire" (2008) |

Shane Nicholson singles chronology
| "Safe and Sound" (2007) | "Rattlin' Bones" (2008) | "Monkey on a Wire" (2008) |

"Rattlin' Bones" is a country song written and performed by Kasey Chambers and Shane Nicholson. It was produced by Kasey's brother, Nash and released in 2008 as the lead single from their collaborative studio album of the same name (2008). The song peaked at number 55 on the ARIA Charts in December 2008.

At the Country Music Awards of Australia of 2009, the song won Song of the Year, Single of the Year and Video of the Year.

At the APRA Music Awards of 2009, the song was nominated for Song of the Year and won Country Work of the Year.

At the Americana Music Honors & Awards of 2010, the song was nominated for Song of the Year.

== Track listing ==
RFD80M-79232
| No. | Title | Length |
|---|---|---|
| 1. | "Rattlin' Bones" | 3:42 |

== Charts ==
Chart performance for "Rattlin' Bones"
| Chart (2008–2009) | Peak position |
|---|---|
| Australia (ARIA) | 55 |
