= Dragonfly (Kasey Chambers album) =

Studio album by Kasey Chambers
- Released: 20 January 2017
- Recorded: Sing Sing Studios
- Genre: Americana, Country Rock
- Label: Warner Bros., Sugar Hill
- Producer: Paul Kelly, Nash Chambers

Kasey Chambers chronology
| Ain't No Little Girl (2016) | Dragonfly (2017) | Campfire (2018) |

Singles from Dragonfly
- 1. "Ain't No Little Girl" Released: 26 August 2016; 2. "Satellite" Released: December 2016

Dragonfly is the eleventh studio album by Australian singer-songwriter Kasey Chambers. It was released on 20 January 2017.

Chambers said working with Paul Kelly on the album "was a dream", also adding: "Paul brought out a whole new side of me, but then I also got to enjoy the comforts of recording with the person who knows and has shaped my original sound better than anyone, my brother Nash, along with my live touring band who have become a huge part on my sound. This double album shows who I am as much as any piece of work I have ever done."

Of the decision to record a double album, Chambers said, "I was just going to do two short sessions and then put them together for one album but both sessions ended up with more finished songs than I'd planned so I decided a double album would be the way to go."

== Reception ==
Professional ratings
Review scores
| Source | Rating |
|---|---|
| Rolling Stone | 4/5 stars |
| Herald Sun | 3.5/5 stars |
| The Music | 3/5 stars |

Gareth Hopewell from Rolling Stone gave the album a positive review, writing: "A towering songbook, wordy and resigned, Dragonfly is the opus of Australia's foremost progenitor of, and innovator in, the country-roots fold. It’s the masterwork of a heart laid bare in song." Cameron Adams from the Herald Sun called the album "mature". Liz Giuffre from The Music AU said: "Dragonfly heralds Kasey Chambers' new era. Written and released after some big personal changes, her already wonderfully distinctive sound has transitioned again. Single "Ain't No Little Girl" is gratifyingly dramatic, rattling with a huskiness that mixes Sia and Martha Wainwright." Giuffre also praised "the gorgeous, tight harmonies of "Jonestown", the rumbling of "Dragonfly" and sliding melancholy of "Annabelle".

== Track listing ==
Sing Sing sessions

1. "Pompeii"
2. "Ain't No Little Girl"
3. "Summer Pillow"
4. "Golden Rails"
5. "Jonestown"
6. "Romeo & Juliet" (with Foy Vance)
7. "Talkin' Baby Blues"
8. "You Ain't Worth Suffering For"
9. "Behind the Eyes of Henri Young"
10. "Hey" (with Paul Kelly)
11. "This Is Gonna Be a Long Year"

Foggy Mountain sessions

1. "Shackle & Chain"
2. "Dragonfly"
3. "If I Died"
4. "Satellite" (with Ed Sheeran)
5. "No Ordinary Man" (with Harry Hookey, Vika & Linda)
6. "If We Had a Child" (with Keith Urban)
7. "Annabelle"
8. "The Devil's Wheel" (with Grizzlee Train)
9. "Ain't No Little Girl" (FM Lounge Version)

== Charts ==
=== Weekly charts ===
| Chart (2017) | Peak position |
|---|---|
| Australian Albums (ARIA) | 1 |
| New Zealand Heatseekers Albums (RMNZ) | 10 |

=== Year-end charts ===
| Chart (2017) | Position |
|---|---|
| Australian Albums (ARIA) | 86 |
| Australian Country Albums Chart | 5 |

== Release history ==
| Region | Date | Format | Edition(s) | Label | Catalogue |
|---|---|---|---|---|---|
| Australia | 20 January 2017 | 2×CD; digital download | Standard | Warner Music Australia | 5419752962 |

== See also ==
- List of number-one albums of 2017 (Australia)
