= Hollywood (Kasey Chambers song) =

Single by Kasey Chambers

from the album Wayward Angel
- Released: 9 August 2004 (Australia)
- Recorded: 2004
- Genre: Country
- Length: 3:31
- Label: Essence
- Songwriter: Kasey Chambers
- Producer: Nash Chambers

Kasey Chambers singles chronology
"True Colours" (2003)	"Hollywood" (2004)	"Pony" (2005)

"Hollywood" is a country song performed and written by Kasey Chambers and produced by her brother, Nash Chambers, released in August 2004 as the lead single from her third studio album Wayward Angel (2004).

The song was nominated for "Most Performed Country Work" at the APRA Music Awards of 2005 and 2006, losing out to Chambers' own "Like a River" in 2005 and "Pony" in 2006.

An acoustic version of the song appeared on a 2005 compilation CD "I Heard It On NPR: Singers, Songs & Sessions".

== Track listing ==
All tracks are written by Kasey Chambers.

No.	Title	Length
1.	"Hollywood"	3:31
2.	"Top of the World" (live)	5:02
3.	"Like a River" (live)	3:36

== Charts ==
Chart (2004)	Peak position
Australia (ARIA)	28
