= Nothing at All (Kasey Chambers song) =

2006 single by Kasey Chambers

Single by Kasey Chambers

from the album Carnival
- Released: 22 July 2006
- Recorded: 2006
- Genre: Country
- Length: 3:23
- Label: Essence
- Songwriter(s): Kasey Chambers
- Producer(s): Nash Chambers

Kasey Chambers singles chronology
"Saturated" (2005)	"Nothing at All" (2006)	"Surrender" (2006)

"Nothing at All" is a country song performed and written by Kasey Chambers and produced by her brother, Nash Chambers, released in July 2006 as the lead single from her fourth studio album Carnival (2006).

The song won the "Most Performed Country Work" at the APRA Music Awards of 2007 It was the third year in a row Chambers won this award. The song earned Chambers a nomination for Best Female Artist at the ARIA Music Awards of 2006.

== Track listing ==
No.	Title	Length
1.	"Nothing at All"	3:23
2.	"Round Here"	4:54
3.	"Circle"	3:33

== Charts ==
=== Weekly charts ===
Chart (2006)	Peak position
Australia (ARIA)	9

=== Year-end charts ===
Chart (2006)	Position
Australian Artists (ARIA)	33
