= The Captain (Kasey Chambers song) =

Single by Kasey Chambers

from the album The Captain
- Released: February 2000 (Australia)
- Recorded: 1999
- Genre: Country
- Length: 4:09
- Label: EMI Music Australia
- Songwriter: Kasey Chambers
- Producer: Nash Chambers

Kasey Chambers singles chronology
"Don't Talk Back" (2000)	"The Captain" (2000)	"Runaway Train" (2001)

"The Captain" is a country song performed and written by Kasey Chambers and produced by her brother, Nash Chambers. It was released in February 2000 as the third and final single from her first studio album, The Captain (1999).

== Reception ==
At the ARIA Music Awards of 2000, the song won Chambers an ARIA Award for Best Female Artist and was nominated for Single of the Year. The song won the "Most Performed Country Work" and was nominated for "Song of the Year" at the APRA Music Awards of 2001.

Junkee said, "Those who find Kasey Chambers’ distinctive twang too much for their ears are depriving themselves of a true joy. Her timid, cracking vocal carries the gorgeous ‘The Captain’, as perfect a country-pop song as there ever was."

The song was used over the closing credits of the Season 3 episode of The Sopranos, He Is Risen.

== Track listing ==
CD Maxi (724389689327)
No.	Title	Length
1.	"The Captain" (radio edit)	4:09
2.	"Water in the Fuel"	4:54
3.	"Another Lonely Day"	3:59

== Charts ==
Chart (2000)	Peak position
Australia (ARIA)	68
