= Kasey Chambers, Poppa Bill and the Little Hillbillies =

Studio album by Kasey Chambers
- Released: 6 November 2009
- Genre: Country, Children's music
- Label: Liberation

Kasey Chambers chronology
Rattlin' Bones (2008)	Kasey Chambers, Poppa Bill and the Little Hillbillies (2009)	Little Bird (2010)

Singles from Kasey Chambers, Poppa Bill and the Little Hillbillies
- 1. "The Lost Music Blues" Released: February 2010

Kasey Chambers, Poppa Bill and the Little Hillbillies is the sixth studio album released by Australian country musician, Kasey Chambers, released 6 November 2009 by Liberation Music in Australia. The children's music album is co-credited to Chambers, her father Bill Chambers as "Poppa Bill", and other members of her family as "the Little Hillbillies". It includes a track, "Two Houses", co-written with her oldest son, Talon Hopper.

It was the 19th best selling country album in Australia in 2009. At the Australian Independent Music Awards of 2010, it won best country album. It was nominated for the Best Children's Album at the ARIA Music Awards of 2010 but lost to the Wiggles' Let's Eat.

== Track listing ==
1. "The Lost Music Blues" – 2:31
2. "The Ballad of Poppa Bill" – 2:40
3. "I Spy" – 2:30
4. "Poppa Bill Says" – 2:22
5. "Do You Remember?" – 2:10
6. "Before You Came Along" – 3:15
7. "Two Houses" – 2:01
8. "Old Man Down on the Farm" – 1:44
9. "My Oh My" – 2:57
10. "When We Were Kids" – 2:58
11. "Sometimes" – 3:16
12. "Something in the Water" – 2:41
13. "Imagination" – 3:40
14. "Blue" – 1:38
15. "Christmas Time" – 3:03
16. "The Best Years" – 2:18
17. "Kasey Chambers Reads 'Little Kasey Chambers and the Lost Music'" – 4:18

== Charts ==
=== Weekly charts ===
Chart (2009–10)	Peak position
Australian ARIA Albums Chart	58

=== Year-end charts ===
Chart (2009)	Position
Australian Country Albums Chart	19
