= Carnival (Kasey Chambers album) =

Studio album by Kasey Chambers
- Released: 19 August 2006
- Recorded: 2006 (Central Coast, New South Wales)
- Genre: Country; pop
- Length: 46:14
- Label: EMI (Australia); Warner Bros. (US)
- Producer: Nash Chambers

Kasey Chambers chronology
Wayward Angel (2004)	Carnival (2006)	Rattlin' Bones (2008)

Singles from Carnival
- 1. "Nothing at All" Released: 22 July 2006; 2. "Surrender" Released: December 2006; 3. "Sign on the Door" Released: 2007

Carnival is the fourth studio album from Australian singer/songwriter Kasey Chambers, released in Australia on 19 August 2006 and in the United States on 12 September 2006.

== History ==
Carnival marks a departure from the trademark styles of Chambers's previous albums, showcasing a more mature and edgier sound. The album features guest appearances by Tim Rogers and Bernard Fanning, as well as appearances by her son, Talon, and nephew, Eden.

On the album, Chambers has said:

It is a little different in places but is still very much a KC album. I feel comfortable with it and have really enjoyed trying some new sounds on certain tracks and old familiar ones on others. There are moments on this album lyrically that are very deep and mean a lot to me but also moments where I have tried to not analyse too much and just let the lyrics flow out naturally. But once again there is (and always be) a little piece of my heart and soul in every line and sound...

On 28 August 2006 the album made its debut on the Australian Albums chart at number one and accrediting Platinum by ARIA. It was knocked off the top spot on its second week in the chart by Bob Dylan's album Modern Times and then on the third week it feel to number three. The album then dropped five places down the chart to number eight and then fell out of the top ten to number fourteen. It spent another two weeks in the top twenty then falling to number twenty-two, then to twenty-eight and after two weeks it fell out of the charts at number forty-two spending eleven weeks in the top fifty.

The album was deemed ineligible for both the Australian and US Billboard country charts, the first of Chambers's albums to not be classified as country. Had it been eligible, based on its sales the album would have charted in the 30s on the Billboard country chart, a similar position to her previous album Wayward Angel.

Two songs were released from the album; "Nothing at All" and "Surrender", both written by Chambers. "Nothing at All" was released as a CD single on 22 July 2006 and had high success debuting and peaking in the Australian Singles Chart top ten at number nine. "Surrender" however was not as successful only peaking at number seventy-four in Australia.

== Critical reception ==
Professional ratings
Review scores
Source	Rating
Allmusic	4/5 stars

Music critic Mark Deming, in his AllMusic wrote "While Carnival is roots-friendly enough that it isn't likely to seriously alienate most of her fans, this album does represent a clear and decisive break from the country-influenced approach of her earlier music... As a vocalist, Chambers remains wonderfully expressive while maintaining a realistic emotional palate at all times, and her instrument is simple but gorgeous... With Carnival, Kasey Chambers gives up her title as the greatest Aussie country singer alive and becomes – the greatest Aussie singer around today? Maybe that's going a bit far to make a point, but after hearing this album, most people would be much less likely to argue the point."

== Track listing ==
All tracks are written by Kasey Chambers

Carnival track listing
No.	Title	Length
1.	"Colour of a Carnival"	3:23
2.	"Sign on the Door"	4:16
3.	"The Rain"	3:42
4.	"Light Up a Candle"	2:47
5.	"Hard Road"	3:59
6.	"Nothing at All"	3:21
7.	"Railroad"	4:21
8.	"I Got You Now"	3:14
9.	"Dangerous"	5:04
10.	"Surrender"	3:55
11.	"You Make Me Sing"	4:10
12.	"Don't Look So Sad"	4:02

== Personnel ==
- Mick Albeck – violin
- Michael Barker – percussion, drums
- Kasey Chambers – harmony vocals
- Nash Chambers – producer, engineer, mixing
- Pete Dyball – assistant
- Bernard Fanning – harmonica, vocals
- Jeff McCormack – bass, engineer, mixing
- Jim Moginie – piano, electric guitar, keyboards, mandola
- Mark Punch – electric guitar, resonator guitar, baritone guitar
- Tim Rogers – vocals
- Steve Smart – mastering
- Daniel Smith – photography
- Michael Spiccia – art direction, design
- Adrian Wallis – cello

== Charts ==
=== Weekly charts ===
Weekly chart performance for Carnival
Chart (2006)	Peak position
Australian Albums (ARIA)	1
US Heatseekers Albums (Billboard)	12

=== Year-end charts ===
Year-end chart performance for Carnival
Chart (2006)	Position
Australian Albums (ARIA)	51

== Certifications ==
Certifications for Carnival
Region	Certification	Certified units/sales
Australia (ARIA)	Platinum	70,000^{^}
^{^} Shipments figures based on certification alone.
