= Campfire (Kasey Chambers album) =

Studio album by Kasey Chambers
- Released: 27 April 2018
- Genre: Country, Americana, Country Folk
- Label: Warner Bros.

Kasey Chambers chronology
Dragonfly (2017)	Campfire (2018)

Singles from Campfire
- 1. "The Campfire Song" Released: 16 March 2018; 2. "Goliath is Dead" Released: 19 April 2018

Campfire is the twelfth studio album by Australian singer-songwriter Kasey Chambers and co-credited to the Fireside Disciples, a trio of Kasey's long-term guitarist Brandon Dodd, Kasey's father Bill Chambers and Yawuru elder Alan Pigram.

Upon release, Chambers said "I grew up with such a unique childhood living on the Nullarbor Plain with my family for the first 10 years of my life. We did all of our cooking on open fire - my dad hunted for our food and then mum would put it in the camp oven. After we'd eaten, my dad brought out the guitar and we'd all sit around this campfire and play music together. For this album I wanted to bring people to the campfire that was such a big part of my life when I was growing up."

The album was released 27 April 2018 and was supported by a 40-date national tour between May and August 2018 across Australia.

At the ARIA Music Awards of 2018, Campfire won the ARIA Award for Best Country Album.

At the Australian Country Music Awards of 2019, the album won Traditional Country Album of the Year.

== Track listing ==
No.	Title	Length
1.	"The Campfire Song" (featuring Alan Pigram)	3:31
2.	"Go On Your Way"	2:01
3.	"Orphan Heart"	3:12
4.	"Goliath Is Dead"	2:26
5.	"Abraham"	6:07
6.	"Early Grave"	3:38
7.	"The Harvest & the Seed" (featuring Emmylou Harris)	3:08
8.	"Big Fish"	1:58
9.	"Junkyard Man"	2:26
10.	"Now That You've Gone"	5:40
11.	"This Little Chicken" (featuring Bill Chambers)	2:09
12.	"Fox & the Bird"	3:24
13.	"Happy" (featuring The Little Pilgrims)	4:07

== Charts ==
=== Weekly charts ===
Chart (2018)	Peak position
Australian Albums (ARIA)	6

=== Year-end charts ===
Chart (2018)	Position
Australian Country Albums (ARIA)	11

== Release history ==
Region	Date	Format	Edition(s)	Label	Catalogue
Australia	27 April 2018	CD; digital download; streaming; Vinyl	Standard	Warner Music Australia	5419700636
