= Wreck & Ruin =

Studio album by Kasey Chambers and Shane Nicholson
- Released: 7 September 2012
- Studio: Central Coast, New South Wales
- Genre: Country, bluegrass
- Length: 33:58
- Label: Liberation
- Producer: Nash Chambers, Kasey Chambers and Shane Nicholson

Kasey Chambers chronology
Storybook (2011)	Wreck & Ruin (2012)	Bittersweet (2014)

Shane Nicholson chronology
Bad Machines (2011)	Wreck & Ruin (2012)	Pitch, Roll & Yaw - Live and Solo (2014)

Wreck & Ruin is the second collaboration album between the Australian country singer Kasey Chambers and the Australian singer Shane Nicholson, released by Liberation Music in Australia on 7 September 2012 (see 2012 in music).

Upon release, Nicholson said "I don't want it to sound flippant, but it quite easy to write. It formed itself quite easily. We were just there, like we were hanging around while the songs were being written. When I listen to the album it sounds easy."

In October 2013, the album won Best Country Album at the 2013 ARIA Awards. It was also nominated for the Best Cover Art, but lost to Ice on the Dune.

== Reception ==
Professional ratings
Aggregate scores
Source	Rating
Metacritic	86/100
Review scores
Source	Rating
AllMusic	4/5 stars
American Songwriter	4/5 stars
The New Zealand Herald	4/5 stars
PopMatters	8/10
Slant Magazine	4/5 stars
The Sydney Morning Herald	4/5 stars
Tom Hull	B+

Mark Deming of AllMusic gave the album a positive review, saying; "The 13 songs they wrote for this project are sublime, hitting their target with impressive skill. Whether they're trying to generate laughter, menace, or a pull on the heartstrings. Kasey Chambers and Shane Nicholson are two of the finest natural talents in country and folk music today need only listen to this to be convinced".

Sienna Cronin from Daily Mercury said "There's an easy feeling about Wreck & Ruin, the new album from Kasey Chambers and Shane Nicholson. It could be the husband-and-wife duo's natural chemistry, their individual talents as songwriters or their wholesome, family approach to life in the music industry - or a combination of all three."

== Track listing ==
All tracks are written by Kasey Chambers and Shane Nicholson.

Wreck & Ruin track listing
No.	Title	Length
1.	"'Til Death Do Us Part"	1:25
2.	"Wreck And Ruin"	2:30
3.	"Adam and Eve"	3:06
4.	"The Quiet Life"	2:37
5.	"Dustbowl"	2:43
6.	"Familiar Strangers"	3:04
7.	"Your Sweet Love"	2:31
8.	"Rusted Shoes"	2:53
9.	"Flat Nail Joe"	2:39
10.	"Have Mercy on Me"	2:56
11.	"Up or Down"	2:30
12.	"Sick as a Dog"	1:53
13.	"Troubled Mind"	3:20

== Personnel ==
- Jeb Cardwell – banjo, resonator guitar (dobro), acoustic guitar, backing vocals
- James Gillard – bass (upright), electric bass, backing vocals
- Steve Fearnley – drums, percussion, backing vocals
- John Bedggood – fiddle, mandolin, backing vocals
- Shane Nicholson – vocals, acoustic guitar, electric guitar, mandolin, accordion, harmonium, harmonica, percussion
- Kasey Chambers – vocals, banjo
- Jeff McCormack – mastering
- Andrew Cooney – photography (band)
- Helen Clemens – photography (Kasey and Shane)

== Charts ==
=== Weekly charts ===
Chart (2012)	Peak Position
Australian Albums (ARIA)	6
UK Country Albums (OCC)	13
US Top Country Albums (Billboard)	35
US Folk Albums (Billboard)	10
US Top Heatseekers Albums (Billboard)	15

=== Year-end charts ===
Chart (2012)	Position
Australian Artist Albums Chart	25
Australian Country Albums Chart	8
Chart (2013)	Position
Australian Country Albums Chart	48
