= The Captain (album) =

Studio album by Kasey Chambers
- Released: 17 May 1999
- Genres: Country, folk
- Length: 42:13
- Labels: EMI (Australia); Asylum (US)
- Producer: Nash Chambers

Kasey Chambers chronology
The Captain (1999)	Barricades & Brickwalls (2001)

Singles from The Captain
- 1. "Cry Like a Baby" Released: February 1999; 2. "Don't Talk Back" Released: August 1999; 3. "The Captain" Released: February 2000

The Captain is the solo debut album of Australian country music singer Kasey Chambers. It was released on 17 May 1999 in Australia, At the 1999 ARIA Music Awards, The Captain won the ARIA Award for Best Country Album. Prior to releasing this album, Chambers had performed more than a decade with her family's Dead Ringer Band, a popular Australian country music group.

The album has been certified 3× platinum in Australia.

== Critical reception ==
Professional ratings
Review scores
Source	Rating
AllMusic	4/5 stars
The Encyclopedia of Popular Music	4/5 stars
Los Angeles Times	3/4 stars
(The New) Rolling Stone Album Guide	3.5/5 stars

The Los Angeles Times concluded: "The opening track, 'Cry Like a Baby', immediately earns her a place on singer-songwriter Olympus with the likes of John Prine and Iris DeMent. Indeed, hers is the most impressive debut in the folk-country field since DeMent's in 1992."

== Track listing ==
All tracks are written by Kasey Chambers, except where noted.

The Captain track listing
No.	Title	Length
1.	"Cry Like a Baby"	3:58
2.	"The Captain"	4:37
3.	"This Flower"	2:47
4.	"You Got the Car"	4:03
5.	"These Pines"	3:59
6.	"Don't Talk Back"	4:45
7.	"Southern Kind of Life"	3:59
8.	"Mr. Baylis"	3:47
9.	"The Hard Way"	2:52
10.	"The Last Hard Bible"	2:20
11.	"Don't Go" (K. Chambers, Worm Werchon)	2:58
12.	"We're All Gonna Die Someday" (K. Chambers, Werchon, Bill Chambers, Paul Henning)	2:08

Special limited edition bonus disc
No.	Title	Length
1.	"I Still Pray"
2.	"Dam"
3.	"Freight Train"
4.	"Water in the Fuel"
5.	"Another Lonely Day"
6.	"Better Be Home Soon"
7.	"Heartbreak Heartmend" (with Paul Kelly)

== Charts ==
=== Weekly charts ===
Weekly chart performance for The Captain
Chart (1999–2002)	Peak position
Australian Albums (ARIA)	11
Australian Country Albums (ARIA)	1
US Top Country Albums (Billboard)	49

=== Year-end charts ===
Year-end chart performance for The Captain
Chart (2000)	Position
Australian Albums (ARIA)	41
Chart (2001)	Position
Australian Country Albums (ARIA)	4
Chart (2002)	Position
Australian Country Albums (ARIA)	5
Chart (2003)	Position
Australian Country Albums (ARIA)	14

== Certifications ==
Certifications for The Captain
Region	Certification	Certified units/sales
Australia (ARIA)	3× Platinum	210,000^{^}
^{^} Shipments figures based on certification alone.
