= Rattlin' Bones =

Studio album by Kasey Chambers and Shane Nicholson
- Released: 21 April 2008
- Recorded: Central Coast, New South Wales
- Genre: Country, bluegrass
- Length: 42:34
- Label: Liberation
- Producer: Nash Chambers

Kasey Chambers chronology
| Carnival (2006) | Rattlin' Bones (2008) | Kasey Chambers, Poppa Bill and the Little Hillbillies (2009) |

Shane Nicholson chronology
| Faith and Science (2006) | Rattlin' Bones (2008) | Familiar Ghosts (2008) |

Professional ratings
Review scores
| Source | Rating |
|---|---|
| AllMusic | 4.5/5 stars |
| Engine 145 | 4.5/5 stars |
| Slant Magazine | 4/5 stars |

Rattlin' Bones is the first collaboration album between the Australian country singer Kasey Chambers and the Australian singer Shane Nicholson, released by Liberation Music in Australia on 21 April 2008.

Chambers said that co-writing was something she always wanted to do but never felt comfortable with until this record because there was no pressure in recording it. Nicholson said that "Writing was a product of our environment, something that happened in and around our daily lives. And something that getting to know the Chambers family has shown me is a beautiful way to make music." "We didn't want a duets album, where people come together for a vocal collaboration and go on their way. We wanted an album that sounds like a band with two singers in it. It feels that way to us. And we hope it feels that way to the people who hear it too." states Chambers again.

The album debuted at number one on the Australian ARIA Albums Chart on 28 April 2008 with sales of 8,965 copies. In October 2008, the album won Best Country Album at the 2008 ARIA Awards. In December 2008, the song "Rattlin' Bones" peaked on the ARIA Singles Charts at number 55. Country Universe named Rattlin' Bones as the second-best country album of the decade.

== Track listing ==
All tracks are written by Kasey Chambers and Shane Nicholson, except where noted

Rattlin' Bones track listing
| No. | Title | Length |
|---|---|---|
| 1. | "Rattlin' Bones" | 3:42 |
| 2. | "Once in a While" (Nicholson) | 2:37 |
| 3. | "Sweetest Waste of Time" | 2:57 |
| 4. | "Monkey on a Wire" (Nicholson) | 3:06 |
| 5. | "One More Year" (Nicholson) | 3:37 |
| 6. | "The House That Never Was" | 3:06 |
| 7. | "Wildflower" | 3:55 |
| 8. | "No One Hurts Up Here" | 2:16 |
| 9. | "The Devil's Inside My Head" (Chambers) | 2:06 |
| 10. | "Sleeping Cold" | 2:55 |
| 11. | "Adeline" | 3:13 |
| 12. | "Jackson Hole" | 3:15 |
| 13. | "Your Day Will Come" (Chambers) | 3:02 |
| 14. | "Woe Is Mine" (alternate title "No Depression") | 2:41 |

== Charts ==
=== Weekly charts ===
Weekly chart performance for Rattlin' Bones
| Chart (2008) | Peak position |
|---|---|
| Australian Albums (ARIA) | 1 |

=== Year-end charts ===
Year-end chart performance for Rattlin' Bones
| Chart (2008) | Position |
|---|---|
| Australian Albums Chart | 11 |
| Australian Country Albums Chart | 1 |
| Chart (2009) | Position |
| Australian Artist Albums Chart | 41 |
| Australian Country Albums Chart | 4 |

== Certifications ==
Certifications for Rattlin' Bones
| Region | Certification | Certified units/sales |
|---|---|---|
| Australia (ARIA) | Platinum | 70,000^{^} |
^{^} Shipments figures based on certification alone.

== Live performance ==
Chambers and Nicholson performed songs from the album Rattlin' Bones at "The Studio", Sydney Opera House, on 9 July 2008 as part of the series The MAX Sessions. A film of the program was released on DVD in 2008.
