= Shane Nicholson (singer) =

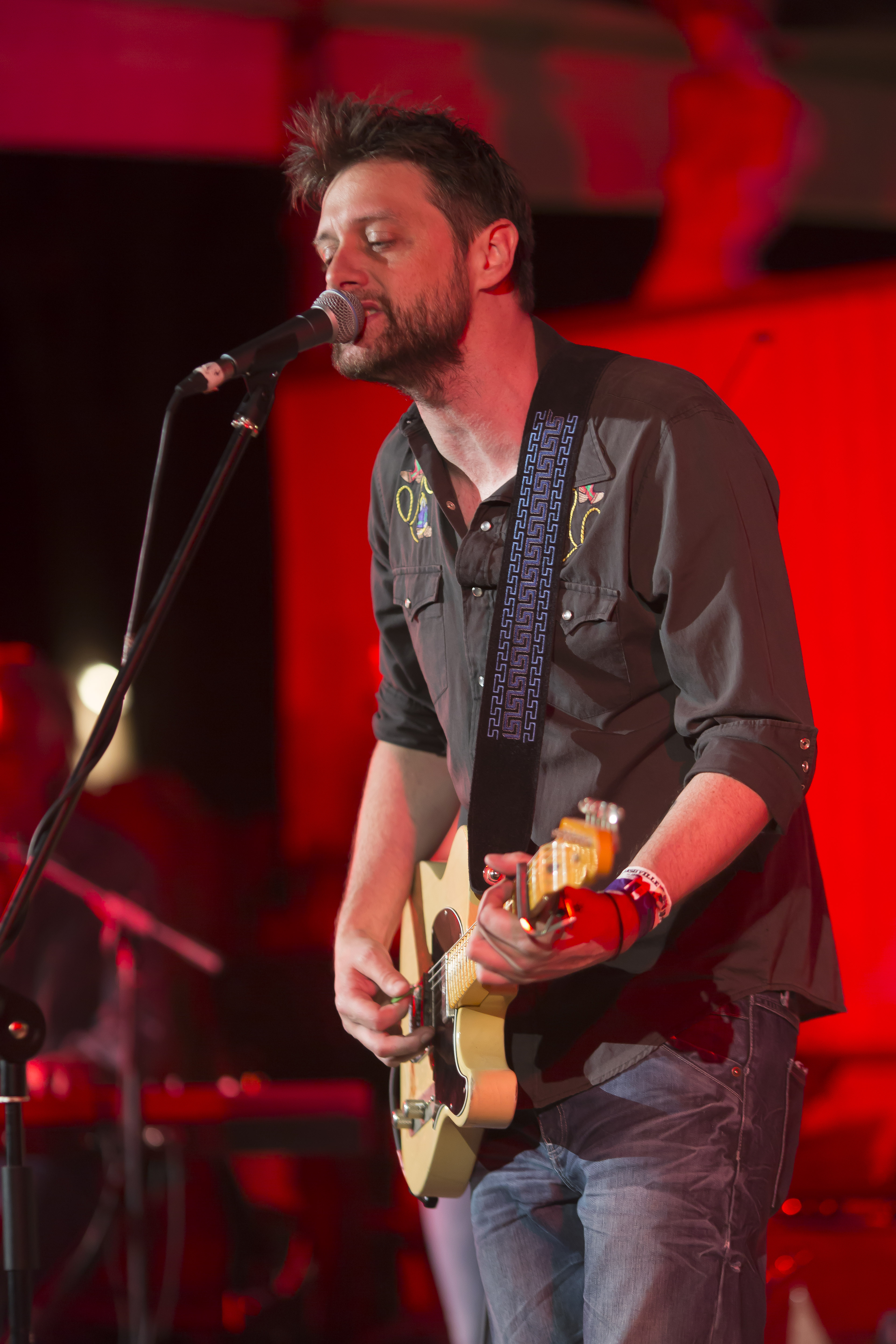
- Nicholson performing at the Dashville Skyline in October 2015

Background information
- Born: Brisbane, Australia
- Genres: Country, Americana
- Occupation: Musician
- Years active: 1998–present
- Labels: Virt Records, Liberation Records, EMI Records, Warner Bros. Records, WEA
- Website: shanenicholson.com

Shane Nicholson is an Australian singer-songwriter from Brisbane. He has released 11 albums, both in Australia and internationally, and has won 3 ARIA Awards, 15 Golden Guitars, and 2 APRA Awards. He's twice been named Producer of the Year at the Country Music Awards of Australia.

== Career ==
=== 1990s–2001: Freak and Pretty Violet Stain ===
During his final year of high school, Nicholson was part of a band called Freak, which won an early round of Triple J Unearthed competition in the Sunshine Coast division. Shortly after this, the band name changed to Pretty Violet Stain and released an extended play in 1997 called Blush. This was followed by singles "If the Money's Right", "Never Come Down" and "Talk" and album Parachutes and Gravity, which was released in 2000. The band split shortly after.

=== 2002–2007: It's a Movie and Faith and Science ===
Nicholson signed with EastWest and released his debut studio album It's a Movie in 2002. It was during the recording of this album with Nash Chambers that Nicholson met Kasey Chambers. The two dueted on the lead single, "Designed to Fade".

He toured in Australia and made his United States debut at the South by Southwest Festival, which prompted his signing with Virt Records and a more extensive American tour. USA Today named It's a Movie one of the top pop albums of 2004.

A second solo album, Faith and Science, was released in 2006 and included the single "I Know What You Need", which became his first charting single, peaking at number 54.

=== 2008–2013: Albums with Kasey Chambers, Familiar Ghosts and Bad Machines ===
Nicholson joined with wife Kasey Chambers for the album Rattlin' Bones, which was released in April 2008 and debuted at number 1 on the ARIA charts. At the ARIA Music Awards of 2008, it won ARIA Award for Best Country Album. The album won five Golden Guitar Awards at the Country Music Awards of Australia (CMAA) in January 2009.

Between tours he recorded a third solo album, Familiar Ghosts, which was released in November 2008 and was nominated for an Best Country Album at the ARIA Music Awards of 2009. This coincided with Nicholson moving into music production.

In March 2011, Nicholson released his sixth solo album, Bad Machines, which peaked at number 29. Nicholson and his wife welcomed a baby girl on 6 October 2011, named Poet Poppin Nicholson.

At the January 2012 CMAA, Nicholson won the Song of the Year for his song, "Bad Machines". Also in 2012, Nicholson won the APRA Country Work of the Year award for "Famous Last Words".

In September 2012, Nicholson and Chambers released a second collaborative album, Wreck & Ruin was peaked at number 6 on the ARIA Charts. The album was nominated for 5 awards at the 2013 CMAA awards, ultimately winning the couple the award for "Group/Duo of the Year". At the ARIA Music Awards of 2013, the album won Best Country Album. Nicholson was named Producer of the Year at the 2013 Country Music Awards of Australia.

On 23 April 2013, it was announced that Nicholson and Kasey Chambers had separated, with the collision of work and family life said to have forced their split.

=== 2014–2020: Hell Breaks Loose and Love and Blood ===
In 2014, Nicholson signed a new recording deal with Lost Highway Australia/Universal Music, and released his first live album, Pitch, Roll & Yaw – Live and Solo.

June 2015 saw the release of "Secondhand Man", the first single from Nicholson's album Hell Breaks Loose. The album was written amongst the break up of this married to Chambers. Released in August 2015, it debuted at No. 16 on the ARIA chart.

Hell Breaks Loose won the ARIA award for Best Country Album at the ARIA Music Awards of 2015 and received 7 CMAA nominations at the 2016 CMAA awards. The album won Alternative Country Album of the Year Award.

Love and Blood was released in July 2017 and debuted at No. 28 on the ARIA chart. It was nominated for Best Country Album at the ARIA Music Awards of 2017. At the CMAA in January 2018, Nicholson won Male Artist of the Year.

Nicholson appeared as an on-camera music producer in ABC television production of The Recording Studio, a 10-part series that ran in April 2019. The music from the series won the 2019 ARIA Award for Best Original Soundtrack, Cast or Show Album.

In May 2019, Nicholson was signed a publishing deal with Cooking Vinyl Australia.

On 3 April 2020, Nicholson confirmed the digital reissued of his back-catalogue.

=== 2021: Living in Colour ===
In July 2021, Nicholson announced the release of his forthcoming studio album, Living in Colour. The album was released on 20 August 2021. August also saw the release of Camille Trail's album River of Sin which Nicholson had produced. It debuted at No. 34 on the ARIA Country Music Charts, and #5 on the ARIA Australian Country Music Charts.

== Personal life ==
On 17 December 2005 Nicholson married fellow country music singer-songwriter, Kasey Chambers. In 2002, Chambers sang on Nicholson's debut solo album "Designed to Fade", which was produced by Kasey's brother, Nash. Subsequently, they co-released two albums, Rattlin' Bones (2008) and Wreck & Ruin (2012). Chambers and Nicholson have two children: son Arlo Ray (2007) and daughter Poet Poppin (2011). In April 2013 the couple announced their separation.

== Discography ==
=== Albums ===
==== Studio albums ====
List of studio albums, with selected chart positions and certifications
Title	Album details	Peak chart positions	Certifications
Title	Album details	AUS	Certifications
It's a Movie	Released: 2002; Label: EastWest / Warner (245577, 0927455772); Formats: CD	—	
Faith & Science	Released: 2006; Label: Essence / EMI (094636128429); Formats: CD	—	
Rattlin' Bones (with Kasey Chambers)	Released: 21 April 2008; Label: Essence / Liberation (LMCD005); Formats: CD, LP, download	1	ARIA: Platinum
Familiar Ghosts	Released: 2008; Label: Liberation (LMCD025); Formats: CD, download	—	
Bad Machines	Released: March 2011; Label: Liberation (LMCD0127); Formats: CD, download	29	
Wreck & Ruin (with Kasey Chambers)	Released: 23 October 2012; Label: Essence / Liberation (LMCD0178); Formats: CD, LP, download	6	
Hell Breaks Loose	Released: August 2015; Label: Lost Highway Australia, UMA (4745547); Formats: CD, LP, download	16	
Love and Blood	Released: August 2017; Label: Lost Highway Australia, UMA (5772093); Formats: CD, LP, download	28	
Living in Colour	Released: 20 August 2021; Label: Lost Highway Australia, Island (3807851); Formats: CD, LP, download, streaming	68	

==== Soundtrack albums ====
List of soundtrack albums with selected details
Title	Album details
Mad Bastards (with The Pigram Brothers, Alex Lloyd & Kasey Chambers)	Released: 2011; Label: Bush Turkey Films (BTF001); Formats: CD, Digital download

==== Live albums ====
List of live albums with selected details
Title	Album details
Pitch, Roll & Yaw – Live and Solo	Released: November 2014; Label: UMA (4711153); Formats: CD, digital download

==== Compilation albums ====
List of compilation albums with selected details
Title	Album details
Sleeping Dogs – The Rarities	Released: 2011; Label: Shane Nicholson; Formats: CD

=== EPs ===
List of EP with selected details
Title	Album details
It's a Home Movie	Released: 2002; Label: EastWest / Warner (SHANSAM002); Formats: Promotional CD
Exit Wounds	Released: 2011; Label: Liberation / UMA; Formats: CD, download

=== Singles ===
List of singles, with selected chart positions
Title	Year	Peak chart positions	Album
Title	Year	AUS	Album
"Designed to Fade"	2002	—	It's a Movie
"I Wish I Was You (Sometimes)"	2003	—	It's a Movie
"I Know What You Need"	2006	54	Faith & Science
"Safe and Sound"	2007	—	Faith & Science
"Rattlin' Bones" (with Kasey Chambers)	2008	55	Rattlin' Bones
"Monkey on a Wire" (with Kasey Chambers)	2008	—	Rattlin' Bones
"Summer Dress"	2008	—	Familiar Ghosts
"Wildflower" (with Kasey Chambers)	2009	—	Rattlin' Bones
"Where the Water Goes"	2009	—	Familiar Ghosts
"Bad Machines"	2010	—	Bad Machines
"Famous Last Words"	2011	—	Bad Machines
"Whistling Cannonballs" (with Paul Kelly)	2011	—	Bad Machines
"Jimmie Rodgers Was a Vampire"	2011	—	Bad Machines
"Adam & Eve" (with Kasey Chambers)	2012	—	Wreck & Ruin
"The Quiet Life" (with Kasey Chambers)	2012	—	Wreck & Ruin
"Wreck & Ruin" (with Kasey Chambers)	2013	—	Wreck & Ruin
"Secondhand Man"	2015	—	Hell Breaks Loose
"When the Money's All Gone"	2015	—	Hell Breaks Loose
"Weight of the World"	2016	—	Hell Breaks Loose
"Safe"	2017	—	Love and Blood
"I Don't Dance"	2017	—	Love and Blood
"Even If You Were the One"	2017	—	Love and Blood
"As Above, So Below" (with Aleyce Simmonds)	2018	—	More Than Meets the Eye
"The High Price of Surviving"	2020	—	Living in Colour
"Long Way from Lonely" (with Hunger Kaine)	2020	—	non album singles
"Don't Take John Prine"	2020	—	non album singles
"Harvest On Vinyl"	2021	—	Living in Colour
"Life Ain't Fine"	2021	—	Living in Colour
"And You Will Have Your Way"	2021	—	Living in Colour
"Sometimes" (with Tori Forsyth)	2023	—	
"The Divorce Song" (with Kasey Chambers)	2025	—	Backbone

== Awards and nominations ==
=== AIR Awards ===
The Australian Independent Record Awards (commonly known informally as AIR Awards) is an annual awards night to recognise, promote and celebrate the success of Australia's Independent Music sector.

Year	Nominee / work	Award	Result
2011	Bad Machines	Best Independent Artist	Nominated

=== Americana Music Awards ===
The Americana Music Honors & Awards honours distinguished members of the music community. Nicholson has been nominated twice.

Year	Nominee / work	Award	Result
2009	Nicholson and Kasey Chambers	Best Duo/ Group of the Year	Nominated
2010	"Rattlin' Bones" (with Kasey Chambers)	Song of the Year	Nominated

=== APRA Music Awards ===
The APRA Music Awards is annual awards ceremony that celebrate excellence in contemporary music, which honour the skills of member composers, songwriters and publishers who have achieved outstanding success in sales and airplay performance. Nicholson has won two awards from five nominations.

Year	Nominee / work	Award	Result
2009	"Rattlin Bones" (with Kasey Chambers)	Song of the Year	Nominated
2009	"Rattlin Bones" (with Kasey Chambers)	Country Work of the Year	Won
2012	"Bad Machines"	Country Work of the Year	Nominated
2012	"Bad Machines"	Song of the Year	Shortlisted
2012	Country Work of the Year	"Famous Last Words"	Won
2013	"Adam and Eve" (Kasey Chambers and Shane Nicholson)	Song of the Year	Shortlisted
2013	"The Quiet Life" (Kasey Chambers and Shane Nicholson)	Song of the Year	Shortlisted
2016	"Secondhand Man"	Country Work of the Year	Nominated
2016	"Secondhand Man"	Song of the Year	Shortlisted

=== ARIA Music Awards ===
The ARIA Music Awards is an annual awards ceremony that recognises excellence, innovation, and achievement across all genres of Australian music. Nicholson has won three awards from eleven nominations.

Year	Nominee / work	Award	Result
2008	Rattlin' Bones (with Kasey Chambers)	Best Country Album	Won
2008	Rattlin' Bones (with Kasey Chambers)	Album of the Year	Nominated
2008	Aaron Hayward & David Homer for Rattlin' Bones	Best Cover Art	Nominated
2009	Rattlin' Bones Max Sessions (with Kasey Chambers)	Best Music DVD	Nominated
2009	Familiar Ghosts	Best Country Album	Nominated
2011	Bad Machines	Best Country Album	Nominated
2013	Wreck & Ruin (with Kasey Chambers)	Best Country Album	Won
2013	Glen Hannah for Wreck & Ruin	Best Cover Art	Nominated
2015	Hell Breaks Loose	Best Country Album	Won
2015	"Secondhand Man" (directed by Filmery)	Best Video	Nominated
2017	Love and Blood	Best Country Album	Nominated
2021	Living in Colour	Best Country Album	Nominated

=== Country Music Awards of Australia ===
The Country Music Awards of Australia (CMAA) (also known as the Golden Guitar Awards) is an annual awards night held in January during the Tamworth Country Music Festival, in Tamworth, New South Wales, celebrating recording excellence in the Australian country music industry. Nicholson has won fifteen awards.

Year	Nominee / work	Award	Result
2009	Rattlin' Bones (with Kasey Chambers)	Album of the Year	Won
2009	Rattlin' Bones (with Kasey Chambers)	Highest Selling Album	Won
2009	"Rattlin' Bones" (with Kasey Chambers)	Song of the Year	Won
2009	"Rattlin' Bones" (with Kasey Chambers)	Single of the Year	Won
2009	"Rattlin' Bones" (with Kasey Chambers)	Video of the Year	Won
2009	himself with Kasey Chambers	Group/Duo of the Year	Nominated
2012	Bad Machines	Album of the Year	Nominated
2012	"Bad Machines"	Song of the Year	Won
2012	"Bad Machines"	Single of the Year	Nominated
2012	"Bad Machines"	Male Artist of the Year	Nominated
2012	"Whistling Cannonballs" (with Paul Kelly)	Vocal Collaboration of the Year	Nominated
2012	"Famous Last Words"	Video of the Year	Nominated
2012	Songs & Pictures by Beccy Cole	Producer of the Year	Nominated
2013	Wreck & Ruin (with Kasey Chambers)	Album of the Year	Nominated
2013	"Adam & Eve" (with Kasey Chambers)	Group or Duo of the Year	Won
2013	"Adam & Eve" (with Kasey Chambers)	Song of the Year	Nominated
2013	"Adam & Eve" (with Kasey Chambers)	Single of the Year	Nominated
2013	"Adam & Eve" (with Kasey Chambers)	Video of the Year	Nominated
2013	"Reach For You" (with Harmony James)	Vocal collaboration of the Year	Nominated
2013	himself	Producer of the Year	Won
2016	Hell Breaks Loose	Alternative Country Album of the Year	Won
2016	Hell Breaks Loose	Male Artist of the Year	Nominated
2016	Hell Breaks Loose	Top Selling Album of the Year	Nominated
2016	"Secondhand Man"	Song of the Year	Nominated
2016	"Secondhand Man"	Single of the Year	Nominated
2016	"Secondhand Man"	Video Clip of the Year	Nominated
2016	"Hermannsburg"	Heritage Song of the Year	Nominated
2016	Producer of the Year	Sweet Rebecca by Beccy Cole	Nominated
2018	Love and Blood	Alternative Country Album of the Year	Nominated
2018	Love and Blood	Male Artist of the Year	Won
2018	"Safe"	Single of the Year	Nominated
2018	"Safe"	Song of the Year	Nominated
2021	"The High Price of Surviving"	Song of the Year	Won
2021	"The High Price of Surviving"	Video of the Year	Nominated
2022	Living in Colour	Album of the Year	Won
2022	Living in Colour	Alt Country Album of the Year	Won
2022	And You Will Have Your Way"	Song of the Year	Won
2022	And You Will Have Your Way"	Single of the Year	Won
2023	"Wiser" (with Lyn Bowtell)	Vocal Collaboration of the Year	Nominated
2024	"Sometimes" (with Toni Forsyth)	Vocal Collaboration of the Year	Nominated
2026	"Ntaria" (Warren H Williams (featuring Kasey Chambers and Shane Nicholson)	Vocal Collaboration of the Year	Nominated
2026	"Ntaria" (Warren H Williams (featuring Kasey Chambers and Shane Nicholson)	Heritage Song of the Year	Nominated
2026	"The Divorce Song" (with Kasey Chambers)	Vocal Collaboration of the Year	Nominated
2026	"The Divorce Song" (with Kasey Chambers)	Song of the Year	Won
2026	"The Divorce Song" (with Kasey Chambers)	Single of the Year	Won

== Selected Production work ==
Year	Artist	Album	Notes
2009	Lou Bradley	La La La Not Listening	
2010	Catherine Britt	Catherine Britt	ARIA Award for Best Country Album, nominated (2010)
2011	Beccy Cole	Songs & Pictures	ARIA Award for Best Country Album, nominated (2012)
2012	Quarry Mountain Dead Rats	Bloodhound Killed My Squeezebox	
2013	Alex Lloyd	Urban Wilderness	
2014	Lyn Bowtell	Heart of Sorrow	
2014	Jodi Martin	Saltwater	
2015	Beccy Cole	Sweet Rebecca	
2015	Suze DeMarchi	Home	
2016	Katie Brianna	The Victim or The Heroine	
2016	Jason Walker	All-Night Ghost Town	
2016	Amber Lawrence	Happy Ever After	
2016	Tori Forsyth	Dawn of the Dark	CMAA Alternative Country Album of the Year, nominated (2017)
2018	Ben Leece	No Wonder The World Is Exhausted	
2021	Camille Trail	River of Sins	
