= Kasey Chambers =

Australian singer-songwriter (born 1976)

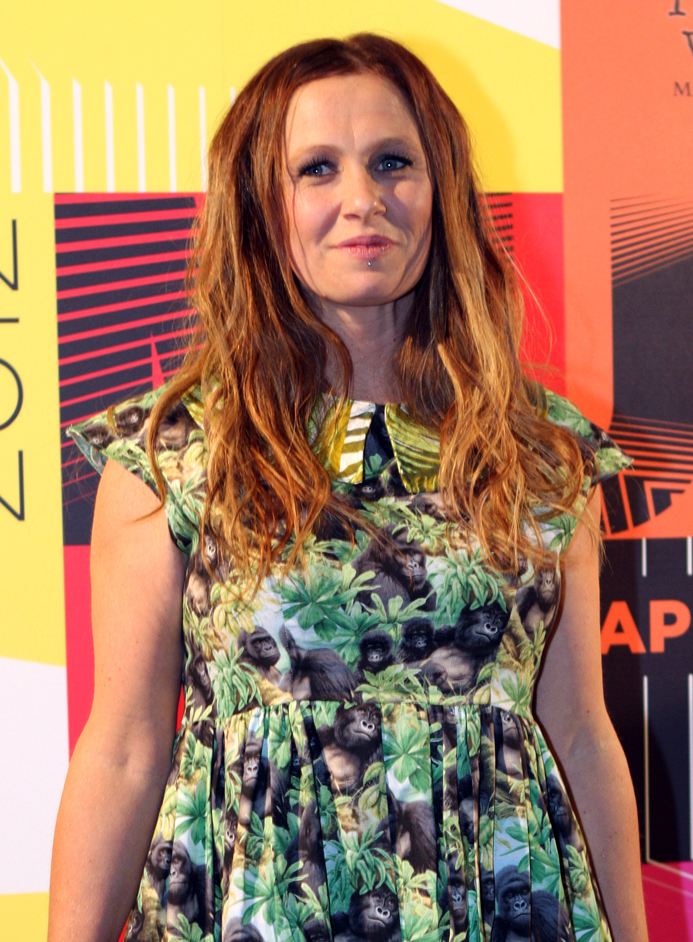
- Chambers in 2012

Background information
- Born: 4 June 1976 (age 50); Mount Gambier, South Australia, Australia
- Origin: Adelaide, South Australia, Australia
- Genre: Country
- Occupation: Musician
- Instruments: Vocals; guitar; banjo
- Years active: 1987–present
- Labels: EMI; Asylum; Essence; Warner Bros.; Liberation/Sugar Hill
- Formerly of: Dead Ringer Band
- Website: kaseychambers.com

Kasey Chambers (born 4 June 1976) is an Australian country singer-songwriter and musician born in Mount Gambier to musicians Diane and Bill Chambers. Her older brother is musician and producer Nash Chambers. All four were members of family country-music group Dead Ringer Band in Bowral, New South Wales, from 1992 to 1998. Chambers launched her solo career thereafter. Five of her 12 studio albums have reached No. 1 on the ARIA Albums Chart: Barricades & Brickwalls (September 2001), Wayward Angel (May 2004), Carnival (August 2006), Rattlin' Bones (April 2008) and Dragonfly (January 2017). In November 2018, she was inducted into the ARIA Hall of Fame and has won an additional 14 ARIA Music Awards with nine for Best Country Album. Her autobiography, A Little Bird Told Me..., co-authored with music journalist Jeff Apter, was released in 2011.

== Dead Ringer Band ==
Kasey Chambers was born in 1976 in Mount Gambier, South Australia, to Diane and Bill Chambers. Her older brother, Nash Chambers, was born in 1974. From July 1976, the Chambers family travelled around the Nullarbor Plain, where her parents hunted foxes and rabbits for pelts during seven or eight months a year, spanning nine years. During the "hot months" (generally from November to March), they returned to Southend, South Australia, where her family owned a fish and chip shop for a time.

From 1986, Bill and Diane returned to performing as a country music duo while their children attended school in Southend. In the following year, the parents added first Kasey and then Nash to their act, which became the Dead Ringer Band – named for the children looking like their parents. Chambers recorded vocals for two albums released under Bill's name: Sea Eagle (1987) and Kindred Spirit (1991). From 1992, Dead Ringer Band released an extended play and four albums. For their first album, Red Desert Sky (November 1993), she was named as Kasey Jo Chambers, provided vocals and wrote four of its tracks. It was co-produced by the group with Eddie Sikorski at John Reynolds Recording Studio, Adelaide.

Chambers met fellow country singer-songwriter Beccy Cole in mid-1989 in Adelaide, and she joined Dead Ringer Band on a tour through New South Wales before going solo. Chambers later recalled, "I never really met anyone at this point in my life that was of the same generation as me – a young girl who liked country music. And funnily enough the first song that I ever wrote in my life was called 'Beccy', about Beccy. It's the worst song you've ever heard in your whole life." She cited Emmylou Harris as one of her primary influences, recalling that her parents had frequently played Harris' music throughout her childhood. The group ended when Chambers' parents divorced in the late 1990s. Diane moved to Norfolk Island, and Bill moved to Sydney.

== Solo career ==
=== 1998–2002: The Captain to Barricades & Brickwalls ===
Chambers recorded her debut solo album, The Captain, on Norfolk Island during July and August 1998 with her brother Nash producing and father Bill on guitar. United States country musicians Buddy and Julie Miller added guitars and vocals to four tracks. Accompanying music video was directed by Ryan Renshaw. The Captain was released in May 1999 by EMI Music Australia and in June 2000 in the US by Asylum Records. It peaked at No. 11 on the ARIA Albums Chart and No. 1 on the related ARIA Country Albums chart. At the ARIA Music Awards of 1999, she won Best Country Album, and in the following year, she won Best Female Artist for its title track, which was issued in 2000.

The Captain was certified double platinum for shipment of 140,000 copies by Australian Recording Industry Association (ARIA) in 2001. It reached the top 50 of the Billboard Top Country Albums in 2001. She toured the US as a support act to Lucinda Williams and later supported Emmylou Harris on the Australian leg of that artist's tour. "The Captain" was played in episode 8 ("He Is Risen") of the third season of The Sopranos, in April 2001.

Chambers' second studio album, Barricades & Brickwalls, which was also produced by Nash, was released in September 2001 via EMI Music. It debuted at No. 4 in the ARIA Albums Chart and peaked at No. 1 in February of the following year. Its third single, "Not Pretty Enough" (January 2002), also peaked at No. 1 on the related ARIA Singles Chart in the same month. The track was written by Chambers, and according to Australian musicologist, Ian McFarlane, "[it's] about being ignored by commercial radio." He cited her autobiography, A Little Bird Told Me (2011), "'I wrote [it] as a song about feeling invisible... it was obvious that out in the music industry there was only one path for most young women – over-sexualised and over made up. To succeed you needed to look like Britney or Shakira."

She is the first Australian country music artist to have a simultaneous No. 1 single and album. Subsequent singles "Million Tears" (June 2002) and "If I Were You" (October) also made the top 40. At the ARIA Music Awards of 2002, she won three categories: Album of the Year, Best Female Artist and Best Country Album, for Barricades & Brickwalls. It was certified seven times platinum in 2003 for shipment of at least 490,000 copies. In February 2002, it was released in the US, which peaked at No. 104 on the Billboard 200, topping the related Heatseeker Chart and reaching the top 20 of their country music chart. It received "generally favorable reviews," according to aggregate site, Metacritic, with a rating of 74% from 12 critics.

Australian music journalist Ed Nimmervoll compared it to her first album: "The musical cast remains essentially the same as The Captain with the addition of a 'rock' component via drummer Peter Luscombe and rhythm guitarist Dave Steel, and a guest appearance from 'punkabilly' band the Living End. The album also features appearances from Paul Kelly and American country's Lucinda Williams." Nimmervoll cited Chambers' observation, "The last album showed my life story. That was Introducing Kasey Chambers. This one's The Many Moods of Kasey Chambers."

=== 2003–2007: Wayward Angel to Carnival ===
Chambers recorded a cover version of Cyndi Lauper's "True Colours" (April 2003), which peaked at No. 4 on the ARIA Singles Chart and was used as the theme song for the Rugby World Cup in that year. Her rendition reached No. 76 on the End of Year Top 100 Singles for 2003, and was certified as a gold record for shipment of 35,000. At the APRA Music Awards of 2003, Chambers won three categories with "Not Pretty Enough" named as Song of the Year, Most Performed Australian Work and Most Performed Country Work.

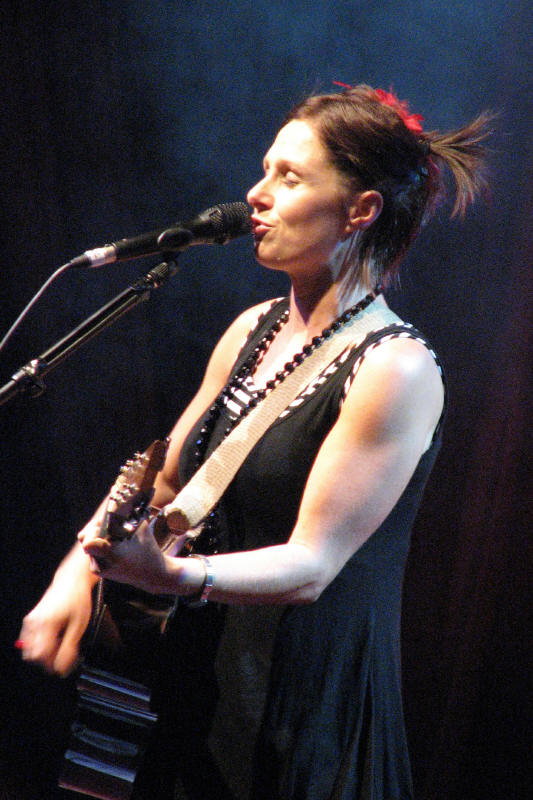
Chambers at the Royal Theatre, Canberra, November 2006

She released her third solo album, Wayward Angel, in May 2004, which debuted at No. 1 on the ARIA Albums Chart and remained at the top position for five weeks. It was accredited triple platinum for shipment of 210,000 copies by the end of the following year. AllMusic's Mark Deming felt, "[it] is perhaps a bit less striking than her first two sets, The Captain and Barricades & Brickwalls, if only because she staked out her style on those sessions, and here she's harvesting from the ground she broke earlier on. But this also sounds like her most accomplished effort to date."

Singles from the album include "Hollywood" (August 2004), "Pony" (January 2005), and "Saturated" (May). Following the Boxing Day Tsunami (26 December 2004), Chambers appeared at the Wave Aid charity concert in Sydney in January 2005, to help raise funds for organisations in disaster affected areas. At the ARIA Music Awards of 2004 she won both Best Female Artist and Best Country Album for Wayward Angel.

Chambers's fourth studio album, Carnival (August 2006), also debuted at No. 1. Deming found, "[it] is roots-friendly enough that it isn't likely to seriously alienate most of her fans, this album does represent a clear and decisive break from the country-influenced approach of her earlier music; most of these 12 songs are easygoing but satisfying roots rock with a bluesy undertone... As a songwriter, she keeps getting better at writing about the stuff of everyday lives (love, lust, disappointment, getting on with life) with an uncommon degree of horse sense and attention to detail, and if anything, the new musical backdrops have added to the depth of her emotional landscapes." Its lead single, "Nothing at All" (July), reached the top 10.

=== 2008–2010: Rattlin' Bones to Little Bird ===
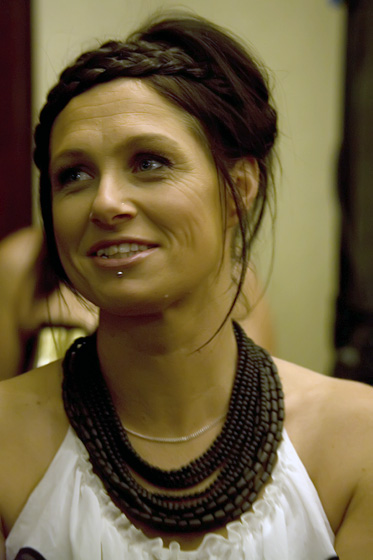
Chambers at the ARIA Hall of Fame, July 2008

In April 2008, Chambers issued her first collaboration album, Rattlin' Bones, with her then-husband Shane Nicholson, which was co-produced by Nash and Nicholson. It debuted at No. 1 and was certified platinum for 70,000 shipments by that year's end. Frank Gutch Jnr of No Depression felt, "[it] could be the soundtrack of the Old West, or themes from the old mountain lifestyle. They have it down, from the sparing use of mandolin and the at times Everly Brothers harmonies to the dirt-beneath-the-fingernails aura. This music is American. Except that it's Australian. It's a conundrum."

Chambers and Nicholson were joined by fellow country musician, Troy Cassar-Daley, to perform at Sound Relief, in March 2009, which was a benefit concert in support of survivors of the February 2009 Victorian bushfires. It was held at the Melbourne Cricket Ground, simultaneously with another concert at the Sydney Cricket Ground. All the proceeds from the Melbourne concert went to the Red Cross Victorian Bushfire relief. Appearing with Chambers in Melbourne were Augie March, Bliss N Eso with Paris Wells, Gabriella Cilmi, Hunters & Collectors, Jack Johnson, Jet, Kings of Leon, Liam Finn, Midnight Oil, Paul Kelly, Split Enz and Wolfmother.

During 2009, Chambers collaborated with Bill, Nash and family members to release a children's music album, Kasey Chambers, Poppa Bill and the Little Hillbillies (November 2009). In 2010, it won the Australian Independent Record (AIR) Award for Best Independent Country Album. As part of that project, she also co-wrote a children's story, Little Kasey Chambers and the Lost Music (2009), with Bernadette Werchon.

Chambers' seventh studio album, Little Bird, was released in September 2010 via Liberation Music, which peaked at No. 3. Slant Magazine's Jonathan Keefe rated it as 4-out-of-5 stars and explained, "[it] is a polished, studio-slick record of pop-country whose songs are catchy as all hell... It's the economy of [her] songwriting that has been the source of the comparisons between her work and that of [Lucinda] Williams, and Chambers's deep understanding of song structure allows her to create real emotional complexity from just a few turns of phrase." It won Best Country Album at the ARIA Awards in 2011.

=== 2011–2013: Storybook to Wreck & Ruin ===
Storybook, Chambers next studio album, was released in September 2011, and consists of cover versions of other artists material, which peaked at No. 21. No Surf Music's Jason D Hamad described how, "because of its very nature I can't say that this album breaks any new ground. Still, it does justice to Chambers' sometimes-eclectic influences and adds an additional layer of understanding for her fans."

Her single from the album, "Luka" (2011), is a rendition of Susan Vega's original from 1987. Hamad discussed how, "[she] strips away the 80's synth-pop, replacing it with more traditional instrumentation including a prominent, bouncing bass, but keeps the airy musical feel meant to contrast with the dark tone of the lyrics." Her autobiography, A Little Bird Told Me..., was co-authored with music journalist, Jeff Apter, and was issued later that year.

Her second collaboration with Nicholson, Wreck & Ruin (September 2012), reached No. 6 and provided another ARIA Award for Best Country Album in the next year. Keefe found the album has, "the married couple layering intricate vocal harmonies over some casual, mostly acoustic country-rock... Though [it] impresses for its thematic focus and gallows humor, the economy of language in the songwriting occasionally scans as a bit pedestrian."

On April 23, 2013, it was announced that Nicholson and Kasey Chambers had separated, their split forced by the collision of work and family life.

=== 2014–2018: Bittersweet to Campfire ===
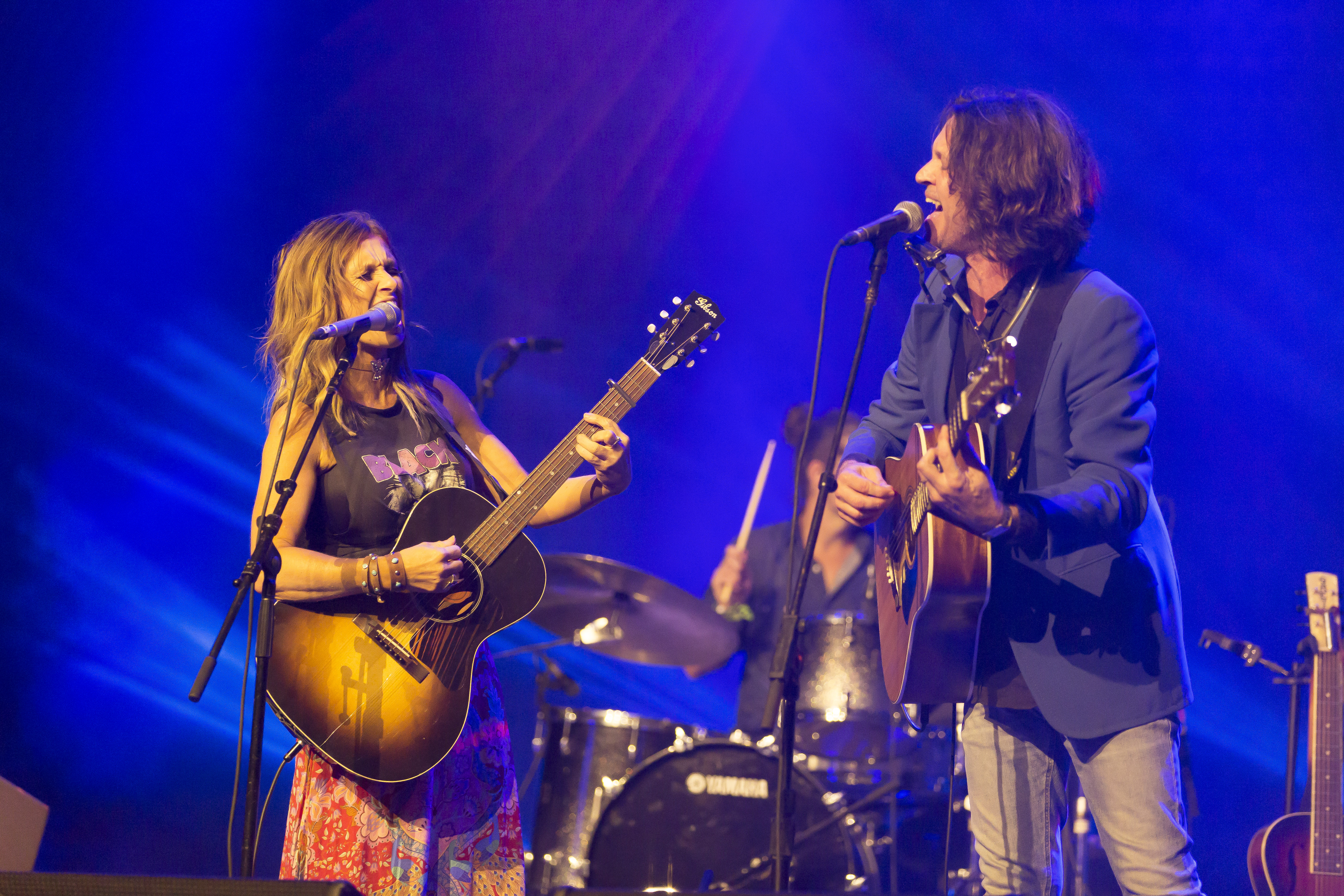
With Bernard Fanning in 2017

Chambers' 10th studio album, Bittersweet, was released in August 2014, which peaked at No. 2. It was produced by Nick DiDia – her first album which was not produced by her brother, Nash. Deming felt, "[she] has written a set of songs that are unpretentiously intelligent but deal with matters of the heart and soul with unrelenting honesty, and her rough, sweet vocals never deliver anything short of the ring of truth. [It] is a strong, satisfying album from one of the best and most distinctive singer/songwriters of her day, and this confirms she can move in any number of different directions and still offer her listeners something remarkable."

It was also recorded after her marital split from Nicholson the previous year. The Music's Chris Familton observed, "It finds her canvassing a range of styles and moods, often with religious/biblical references, without sacrificing her heart-on-sleeve emotiveness, innate sense of melody and country heart." The title track is a duet with Bernard Fanning (ex-Powderfinger), which Familton found, "sways with a Neil Young looseness that works surprisingly well." It won Best Country Album at the ARIA Music Awards of 2014.

In late 2015, she covered the track, "Cold and Bitter Tears", on a tribute album for US soul blues musician, Ted Hawkins, Cold and Bitter Tears: The Songs of Ted Hawkins, which was released on Eight 30 Records in Austin, Texas. She was joined on the track by Bill and explained, "My dad called me up one day and told me about the project... We recorded it at my dad's house, sitting around jamming around a mike. It was a really special thing. I play with my dad all the time, but the novelty never wears off. I love the combination that we create together."

Dragonfly, was released in January 2017 and reached No. 1. It is a double album with Nash producing one session at his Foggy Mountain studio and Australian singer-songwriter Paul Kelly producing another session at Sing Sing Studios, Melbourne. She followed with a U.S. tour in mid-year. Besides duetting on a track with Kelly, she also sings on a track each with Ed Sheeran, Keith Urban and Foy Vance.

Rolling Stone Australia's Gareth Hipwell observed, "[she] has always tended to eschew the more reticent course of songwriting from a point of abstraction, consistently wearing her profoundest truths and uncertainties on her sleeve. It's an artistic penchant given full flight on free-ranging double-LP Dragonfly: 'Talkin' Baby Blues', a shot of Woody Guthriesque spoken-word acoustica, is itself a stunningly candid retelling of Chambers' storied life to date." Jonathan Bernstein of American Songwriter rated it at 3.5 stars out of 5 and explained, "[it] serves as a summation of sorts of the singer's entire career, a comprehensive, double-album opus that effortlessly switches between Appalachian mountain music, slow-burning folk-rock, melodic radio-pop, Woody Guthrie talking blues, and celebratory country-gospel." At the ARIA Music Awards of 2017, she won her eighth Best Country Album trophy, for Dragonfly.

Chambers' 12th studio album, Campfire (April 2018), is a collaboration with the Fireside Disciples, an "ad hoc acoustic ensemble," comprising Bill on dobro, Brandon Dodd on acoustic guitar, and Alan Pigram on mandolin (and vocals on the album's lead track). It peaked at No. 6 and was co-produced by Chambers, Bill, Dodd, Pigram and Jordan Power. At the ARIA Music Awards of 2018, Chambers became the youngest solo female artist to be inducted into the ARIA Hall of Fame, as well as winning the Best Country Album category for a record ninth time. At the Australian Country Music Awards of 2019, Campfire won Traditional Country Album of the Year.

=== 2024: Backbone ===
In July 2024, Chambers announced her 13th studio album Backbone, released in October, and book Just Don't Be a D**khead.

== Personal life ==
From 2000, Kasey Chambers' domestic partner was Cori Hopper, a Perth-born actor, film and music video maker, later based in Sydney. Their son Talon was born in 2002, and they separated in November 2004. Hopper was a presenter on Australia's Funniest Home Videos from January to December of that year and was a regular cast member on The Wedge during 2006.

On December 17, 2005, Chambers married fellow country music singer-songwriter Shane Nicholson. Chambers had sung a duet, "Designed to Fade," with Nicholson on his debut solo album, It's a Movie (2002), which was produced by Nash Chambers. Subsequently, they co-released two albums, Rattlin' Bones (2008) and Wreck & Ruin (2012). Their son Arlo Ray was born in 2007, followed by daughter Poet Poppin in 2011. In April 2013, the couple announced their separation. In 2024, they recorded "The Divorce Song" which featured on Chambers' album Backbone.

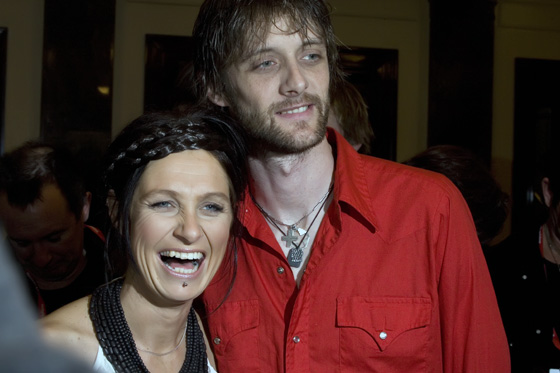
Chambers and Shane Nicholson, at the ARIA Hall of Fame, July 2008

At age 30, Chambers was diagnosed with a combination of the eating disorders bulimia and anorexia nervosa. She explained, "I just didn't feel myself and I knew that something wasn't right [...] It wasn't an image thing for me ... It wasn't 'Oh I look fat in photos'. It was more about the control thing." She was treated by a psychologist, and MammaMia's Jessie Stephens observed, "she recognises the importance of accepting that it might be a bad day, or a bad week, and negativity is a vital part of living a balanced life. Pushing it away can lead to anxieties manifesting in a different, more debilitating way."

In her autobiography, A Little Bird Told Me... (2011), Chambers provided, "a disarmingly honest account of a remarkable talent." The Herald Sun's Corinna Hente observed, "Despite all the success, tragedy struck through a miscarriage, a broken relationship, anorexia and a breakdown. She rebuilt her life with music, playing covers with her family in a band called the Lost Dogs at the local pub." She described one of their gigs from July 2007, "it's not the best idea to get up and sing with a band when you're nine months pregnant, 10 days overdue and bigger than a barn, but there was something about my gigs with the Lost Dogs band that I found impossible to resist. They were a reminder of why I'd fallen in love with music in the first place."

Chambers was raised in the Seventh-day Adventist Church by her parents. After releasing her single, "Is God Real?" (April 2015), she described her beliefs, "It is a very personal thing, which is probably why we don't talk about it, but I don't think that means we shouldn't... For me, I certainly believe in a higher power. I don't have a yes or no answer. I have some sort of belief there, but it has changed a lot over the years." As of November 2018, she lives in Copacabana, New South Wales Central Coast.

== Bibliography ==
- Chambers, Kasey; Werchon, Bernadette (2009), Little Kasey Chambers and the Lost Music, Harrold, Emma, (illustrator), Essence Music / Liberation Music, OCLC 503530157
- Chambers, Kasey; Apter, Jeff (2011), A Little Bird Told Me..., HarperCollins, ISBN 978-0-7322-9108-2
- Chambers, Kasey (2024), Just Don't Be a Dickhead and Other Profound Things I've Learnt, Hardie Grant, ISBN 9781761451027

== Discography ==
- The Captain (1999)
- Barricades & Brickwalls (2001)
- Wayward Angel (2004)
- Carnival (2006)
- Rattlin' Bones (with Shane Nicholson) (2008)
- Kasey Chambers, Poppa Bill and the Little Hillbillies (2009)
- Little Bird (2010)
- Storybook (2011)
- Wreck & Ruin (with Shane Nicholson) (2012)
- Bittersweet (2014)
- Dragonfly (2017)
- Campfire (with the Fireside Disciples) (2018)
- Backbone (2024)

== Awards and nominations ==
Chambers has won and been nominated for numerous music awards. They include 14 Australian Recording Industry Association (ARIA) Awards and 10 Australasian Performing Right Association (APRA) Awards. She was inducted into the ARIA Hall of Fame in 2018. This induction recognised her achievement of a "significant body of recorded work" and that she "has had a cultural impact within Australia." Chambers has also won awards in the country music field with twenty eight from the Country Music Association of Australia (CMAA).
