= List of number-one club tracks of 2001 (Australia) =

ARIA Charts number-one club tracks of 2001 2002 >

Other Australian number-one charts of 2001
- albums
- singles
- dance singles

Top Australian singles and albums of 2001
- Triple J Hottest 100
- top 25 singles
- top 25 albums

This is a list of ARIA club chart number-one hits from 2001, which is collected from Australian Recording Industry Association (ARIA) from weekly DJ reports.

== Chart ==
Date		Song	Artist(s)	Reference
January	1	"Operation Blade"	Public Domain	
January	8	"Operation Blade"	Public Domain	
January	15	"Operation Blade"	Public Domain	
January	22	"Operation Blade"	Public Domain	
January	29	"Operation Blade"	Public Domain	
February	5	"Operation Blade"	Public Domain	
February	12	"Played-A-Live (The Bongo Song)"	Safri Duo	
February	19	"Touch Me"	Rui da Silva featuring Cass Fox	
February	26	"We Will Survive"	Warp Brothers vs. Aquagen	
March	5	"We Will Survive"	Warp Brothers vs. Aquagen	
March	12	"Chase the Sun"	Planet Funk	
March	19	"Chase the Sun"	Planet Funk	
March	26	"Nine Ways"	JDS	
April	2	"My Beat"	Blaze featuring Palmer Brown	
April	9	"My Beat"	Blaze featuring Palmer Brown	
April	16	"Salsoul Nugget (If U Wanna)"	M&S Presents The Girl Next Door	
April	23	"My Beat"	Blaze featuring Palmer Brown	
April	30	"Love In Traffic"	Satoshi Tomiie featuring Kelli Ali	
May	7	"American Dream"	Jakatta	
May	14	"True Love"	Platinum Groove Project	
May	21	"What It Feels Like for a Girl"	Madonna	
May	28	"What It Feels Like for a Girl"	Madonna	
June	4	"What It Feels Like for a Girl"	Madonna	
June	11	"What It Feels Like for a Girl"	Madonna	
June	18	"Bel Amour"	Frank Keller Jr. featuring Sydney	
June	25	"Let It Ride"	Sgt Slick	
July	2	"Bass Has Got Me Movin'"	Love Tattoo	
July	9	"Bass Has Got Me Movin'"	Love Tattoo	
July	16	"Bass Has Got Me Movin'"	Love Tattoo	
July	23	"Keep Control"	Sono	
July	30	"Keep Control"	Sono	
August	6	"Keep Control"	Sono	
August	13	"Another Chance"	Roger Sanchez	
August	20	"Precious Heart"	Tall Paul vs. INXS	
August	27	"Starlight"	The Supermen Lovers	
September	3	"Another Chance"	Roger Sanchez	
September	10	"Starlight"	The Supermen Lovers	
September	17	"Starlight"	The Supermen Lovers	
September	24	"Starlight"	The Supermen Lovers	
October	1	"Starlight"	The Supermen Lovers	
October	8	"Starlight"	The Supermen Lovers	
October	15	"Flawless"	The Ones	
October	22	"Flawless"	The Ones	
October	29	"Rapture"	iiO	
November	5	"Rapture"	iiO	
November	12	"Rapture"	iiO	
November	19	"Rapture"	iiO	
November	26	"Rapture"	iiO	
December	3	"Rapture"	iiO	
December	10	"Rapture"	iiO	
December	17	"Rapture"	iiO	
December	24	"Rapture"	iiO	
December	31	"Rapture"	iiO	

== Number-one artists ==
Position	Artist	Weeks at No. 1
1	iiO	10
2	Public Domain	6
2	The Supermen Lovers	6
3	Madonna	4
4	Blaze	3
4	Palmer Brown	3
4	Love Tattoo	3
4	Sono	3
5	The Ones	2
5	Planet Funk	2
5	Roger Sanchez	2
5	Warp Brothers	2
5	Aquagen	2
6	Frank Keller Jr	1
6	Jakatta	1
6	JDS	1
6	M&S	1
6	The Girl Next Door	1
6	Platinum Groove Project	1
6	Rui da Silva	1
6	Safri Duo	1
6	Satoshi Tomiie	1
6	Kelli Ali	1
6	Sgt Slick	1
6	Tall Paul	1
6	INXS	1

== See also ==
- ARIA Charts
- List of number-one singles of 2001 (Australia)
- List of number-one albums of 2001 (Australia)
- 2001 in music
