= List of number-one urban singles of 2001 (Australia) =

ARIA Charts number-one urban singles of 2001 2002 >

Other Australian number-one charts of 2001
- albums
- singles
- dance singles

Top Australian singles and albums of 2001
- Triple J Hottest 100
- top 25 singles
- top 25 albums

The ARIA Urban Chart is a chart that ranks the best-performing Urban tracks singles of Australia. It is published by Australian Recording Industry Association (ARIA), an organisation who collect music data for the weekly ARIA Charts. To be eligible to appear on the chart, the recording must be a single, and be "predominantly of a Urban nature".

== Chart history ==
Issue date	Song	Artist(s)	Reference
1 January	"Independent Women"	Destiny's Child	
8 January	"Independent Women"	Destiny's Child	
15 January	"Dance with Me"	Debelah Morgan	
22 January	"Dance with Me"	Debelah Morgan	
29 January	"Dance with Me"	Debelah Morgan	
5 February	"Stan"	Eminem	
12 February	"Stan"	Eminem	
19 February	"Stan"	Eminem	
26 February	"Stan"	Eminem	
5 March	"Stan"	Eminem	
12 March	"Case of the Ex"	Mýa	
19 March	"Case of the Ex"	Mýa	
26 March	"It Wasn't Me"	Shaggy	
2 April	"It Wasn't Me"	Shaggy	
9 April	"It Wasn't Me"	Shaggy	
16 April	"It Wasn't Me"	Shaggy	
23 April	"It Wasn't Me"	Shaggy	
30 April	"It Wasn't Me"	Shaggy	
7 May	"Lady Marmalade"	Christina Aguilera, Lil' Kim, Mýa & Pink	
14 May	"Lady Marmalade"	Christina Aguilera, Lil' Kim, Mýa & Pink	
21 May	"Lady Marmalade"	Christina Aguilera, Lil' Kim, Mýa & Pink	
28 May	"Lady Marmalade"	Christina Aguilera, Lil' Kim, Mýa & Pink	
4 June	"Angel"	Shaggy	
11 June	"Angel"	Shaggy	
18 June	"Angel"	Shaggy	
25 June	"Angel"	Shaggy	
2 July	"Angel"	Shaggy	
9 July	"Angel"	Shaggy	
16 July	"Angel"	Shaggy	
23 July	"Angel"	Shaggy	
30 July	"Angel"	Shaggy	
6 August	"Let's Get Married"	Jagged Edge	
13 August	"Purple Pills"	D12	
20 August	"All Rise"	Blue	
27 August	"All Rise"	Blue	
3 September	"All Rise"	Blue	
10 September	"Ride wit Me"	Nelly	
17 September	"All Rise"	Blue	
24 September	"Hit 'Em Up Style (Oops!)"	Blu Cantrell	
1 October	"Because I Got High"	Afroman	
8 October	"Because I Got High"	Afroman	
15 October	"Because I Got High"	Afroman	
22 October	"Because I Got High"	Afroman	
29 October	"Because I Got High"	Afroman	
5 November	"Because I Got High"	Afroman	
12 November	"Because I Got High"	Afroman	
19 November	"What Would You Do?"	City High	
26 November	"What Would You Do?"	City High	
3 December	"What Would You Do?"	City High	
10 December	"What Would You Do?"	City High	
17 December	"What Would You Do?"	City High	
24 December	"What Would You Do?"	City High	
31 December	"I'm Real"	Jennifer Lopez	

== Number-one artists ==
Position	Artist	Weeks at No. 1
1	Shaggy	15
2	Afroman	7
3	City High	6
3	Mýa	6
4	Eminem	5
5	Blue	4
5	Christina Aguilera	4
5	Lil' Kim	4
8	Debelah Morgan	3
7	Destiny's Child	2
8	Blu Cantrell	1
8	D12	1
8	Jagged Edge	1
8	Jennifer Lopez	1
8	Nelly	1

== See also ==
- 2001 in music
- List of number-one singles of 2001 (Australia)
