= List of number-one urban albums of 2001 (Australia) =

ARIA Charts number-one urban albums of 2001 < 2000 2002 >

Other Australian number-one charts of 2001
- albums
- singles
- dance singles

Top Australian singles and albums of 2001
- Triple J Hottest 100
- top 25 singles
- top 25 albums

This is a list of albums that reached number-one on the ARIA Urban Albums Chart in 2001. The ARIA Urban Albums Chart is a weekly chart that ranks the best-performing urban albums in Australia. It is published by the Australian Recording Industry Association (ARIA), an organisation that collects music data for the weekly ARIA Charts. To be eligible to appear on the chart, the recording must be an album of a predominantly urban nature.

== Chart history ==
Issue date	Album	Artist(s)	Reference
1 January	Born to Do It	Craig David	
8 January	Born to Do It	Craig David	
15 January	Charlie's Angels Soundtrack	Various Artists	
22 January	Born to Do It	Craig David	
29 January	J.Lo	Jennifer Lopez	
5 February	J.Lo	Jennifer Lopez	
12 February	J.Lo	Jennifer Lopez	
19 February	The Marshall Mathers LP	Eminem	
26 February	The Marshall Mathers LP	Eminem	
5 March	The Marshall Mathers LP	Eminem	
12 March	The Marshall Mathers LP	Eminem	
19 March	The Marshall Mathers LP	Eminem	
26 March	The Marshall Mathers LP	Eminem	
2 April	Born To Do It	Craig David	
9 April	Born To Do It	Craig David	
16 April	Born To Do It	Craig David	
23 April	Born To Do It	Craig David	
30 April	Born To Do It	Craig David	
7 May	Born To Do It	Craig David	
14 May	Born To Do It	Craig David	
21 May	Born To Do It	Craig David	
28 May	Born To Do It	Craig David	
4 June	Born To Do It	Craig David	
11 June	Born To Do It	Craig David	
18 June	Hot Shot	Shaggy	
25 June	Hot Shot	Shaggy	
2 July	Hot Shot	Shaggy	
9 July	Hot Shot	Shaggy	
16 July	Hot Shot	Shaggy	
23 July	Hot Shot	Shaggy	
30 July	Hot Shot	Shaggy	
6 August	Devil's Night	D12	
13 August	Devil's Night	D12	
20 August	Devil's Night	D12	
27 August	Devil's Night	D12	
3 September	Glitter (soundtrack)	Mariah Carey	
10 September	A Funk Odyssey	Jamiroquai	
17 September	Country Grammar	Nelly	
24 September	The Id	Macy Gray	
1 October	The Id	Macy Gray	
8 October	Country Grammar	Nelly	
15 October	The Id	Macy Gray	
22 October	Country Grammar	Nelly	
29 October	Country Grammar	Nelly	
5 November	Invincible	Michael Jackson	
12 November	Invincible	Michael Jackson	
19 November	Invincible	Michael Jackson	
26 November	Invincible	Michael Jackson	
3 December	Hot Shot	Shaggy	
10 December	Hot Shot	Shaggy	
17 December	Hot Shot	Shaggy	
24 December	Hot Shot	Shaggy	
31 December	Hot Shot	Shaggy	

== See also ==
- 2001 in music
- List of number-one albums of 2001 (Australia)
