= List of top 25 singles for 2001 in Australia =

Top 25 singles of 2001 < 2000 2002 >

Other Australian top charts for 2001
- top 25 albums
- Triple J Hottest 100

Australian number-one charts of 2001
- albums
- singles
- dance singles

The following lists the top 100 singles of 2001 in Australia from the Australian Recording Industry Association (ARIA) End of Year singles chart.

"Can't Fight the Moonlight" by LeAnn Rimes was the biggest song of the year, peaking at #1 for six weeks and staying in the top 50 for 22 weeks. The longest stay at #1 was joint by Shaggy with "Angel" which spent 8 weeks at the top spot, and it was joint by Alien Ant Farm's "Smooth Criminal".

#	Title	Artist	Highest pos. reached	Weeks at No. 1
1.	"Can't Fight the Moonlight"	LeAnn Rimes	1	6
2.	"It Wasn't Me"	Shaggy	1	4
3.	"Can't Get You Out of My Head"	Kylie Minogue	1	4
4.	"Angel"	Shaggy	1	8
5.	"Hanging by a Moment"	Lifehouse	1	5
6.	"Stan"	Eminem feat. Dido	1	1
7.	"I'm Like a Bird"	Nelly Furtado	2	2
8.	"Smooth Criminal"	Alien Ant Farm	1	8
9.	"Can We Fix It?"	Bob the Builder	1	1
10.	"Whole Again"	Atomic Kitten	2	1
11.	"Case of the Ex"	Mýa	1	2
12.	"Butterfly"	Crazy Town	4	1
13.	"Lady Marmalade"	Christina Aguilera, Pink, Mýa and Lil' Kim	1	3
14.	"Because I Got High"	Afroman	1	3
15.	"Me, Myself, and I"	Scandal'us	1	3
16.	"Don't Stop Movin'"	S Club 7	2	4
17.	"Ms. Jackson"	Outkast	2	4
18.	"How You Remind Me"	Nickelback	2	1
19.	"Let's Get Married"	Jagged Edge	2	1
20.	"With Arms Wide Open"	Creed	4	2
21.	"Strawberry Kisses"	Nikki Webster	2	7
22.	"All Rise"	Blue	3	3
23.	"Drops of Jupiter (Tell Me)"	Train	5	2
24.	"Let Me Blow Ya Mind"	Eve feat. Gwen Stefani	4	1
25.	"Operation Blade"	Public Domain	7	2
26.	"Mambo No. 5"	Lou Bega	2	2
27.	"Cruisin'"	Gwyneth Paltrow and Huey Lewis	1	2
28.	"Teenage Dirtbag"	Wheatus	1	4
29.	"What Would You Do?"	City High	2	2
30.	"Walking Away"	Craig David	5	1
31.	"Dance with Me"	Debelah Morgan	3	2
32.	"Free"	Mýa	4	2
33.	"Yellow"	Coldplay	5	3
34.	"It's Raining Men"	Geri Halliwell	4	1
35.	"Bette Davis Eyes"	Gwyneth Paltrow	3	1
36.	"I'm a Believer"	Smash Mouth	9	2
37.	"Out of Reach"	Gabrielle	9	3
38.	"Turn Off the Light"	Nelly Furtado	7	1
39.	"Bow Wow (That's My Name)"	Lil Bow Wow	6	1
40.	"Ride wit Me"	Nelly	4	3
41.	"Kryptonite"	3 Doors Down	8	2
42.	"One Step Closer"	Linkin Park	4	3
43.	"Miss California"	Dante Thomas	5	1
44.	"Uptown Girl"	Westlife	6	1
45.	"Rollin'"	Limp Bizkit	11	1
46.	"You All Dat"	Baha Men	8	1
47.	"U Remind Me"	Usher	4	1
48.	"Purple Pills"	D12	3	1
49.	"Follow Me"	Uncle Kracker	1	1
50.	"Bootylicious"	Destiny's Child	4	2
51.	"Luv Me, Luv Me"	Shaggy	10	2
52.	"Fallin'"	Alicia Keys	7	2
53.	"I'm Real"	Jennifer Lopez	3	1
54.	"Hit 'Em Up Style (Oops!)"	Blu Cantrell	3	1
55.	"Survivor"	Destiny's Child	7	1
56.	"All for You"	Janet Jackson	5	1
57.	"Independent Women Part I"	Destiny's Child	3	3
58.	"7 Days"	Craig David	4	1
59.	"I Need Somebody"	Bardot	5	1
60.	"One More Time"	Daft Punk	10	1
61.	"Love Don't Cost a Thing"	Jennifer Lopez	4	1
62.	"E.I."	Nelly	12	1
63.	"What Took You So Long?"	Emma Bunton	10	1
64.	"It's Over"	Kurupt	15	1
65.	"Too Close"	Blue	5	1
66.	"Around the World (La La La La La)"	ATC	11	3
67.	"Starlight"	The Supermen Lovers	12	3
68.	"Original Prankster"	The Offspring	5	1
69.	"The Itch"	Vitamin C	6	1
70.	"Dancing in the Moonlight"	Toploader	12	1
71.	"Amazing"	Alex Lloyd	14	2
72.	"Hero"	Enrique Iglesias	1	2
73.	"Play"	Jennifer Lopez	14	1
74.	"Clint Eastwood"	Gorillaz	17	1
75.	"In My Pocket"	Mandy Moore	11	1
76.	"Another Day in Paradise"	Brandy and Ray J	11	1
77.	"Country Grammar (Hot Shit)"	Nelly	20	2
78.	"Don't Tell Me"	Madonna	7	2
79.	"Just the Thing"	Paul Mac featuring Peta Morris	17	1
80.	"Wassup!"	Da Muttz	12	1
81.	"Thank God I'm a Country Boy"	Hampton the Hampster	12	2
82.	"Let's Dance"	Five	3	1
83.	"The Hampsterdance Song"	Hampton the Hampster	5	1
84.	"What It Feels Like for a Girl"	Madonna	6	1
85.	"Supreme"	Robbie Williams	14	1
86.	"Sky"	Sonique	18	2
87.	"The Power / Every Time I Close My Eyes"	Vanessa Amorosi	8	2
88.	"Again"	Lenny Kravitz	30	2
89.	"Everytime You Need Me"	Fragma	17	1
90.	"No More (Baby I'ma Do Right)"	3LW	26	2
91.	"Stuck in a Moment You Can't Get Out Of"	U2	3	1
92.	"Drive"	Incubus	34	1
93.	"Don't Mess with the Radio"	Nivea	14	1
94.	"Better Man"	Robbie Williams	6	4
95.	"Where the Party At"	Jagged Edge	13	1
96.	"Bad Boy for Life"	P. Diddy, Black Rob and Mark Curry	20	1
97.	"Don't Think I'm Not"	Kandi	16	1
98.	"Family Affair"	Mary J. Blige	8	1
99.	"I'm a Slave 4 U"	Britney Spears	7	1
100.	"Lovin' Each Day"	Ronan Keating	21	1
