= List of number-one dance singles of 2001 (Australia) =

ARIA Charts number-one dance singles of 2001 2002 >

Other Australian number-one charts of 2001
- albums
- singles

Top Australian singles and albums of 2001
- Triple J Hottest 100
- top 25 singles
- top 25 albums

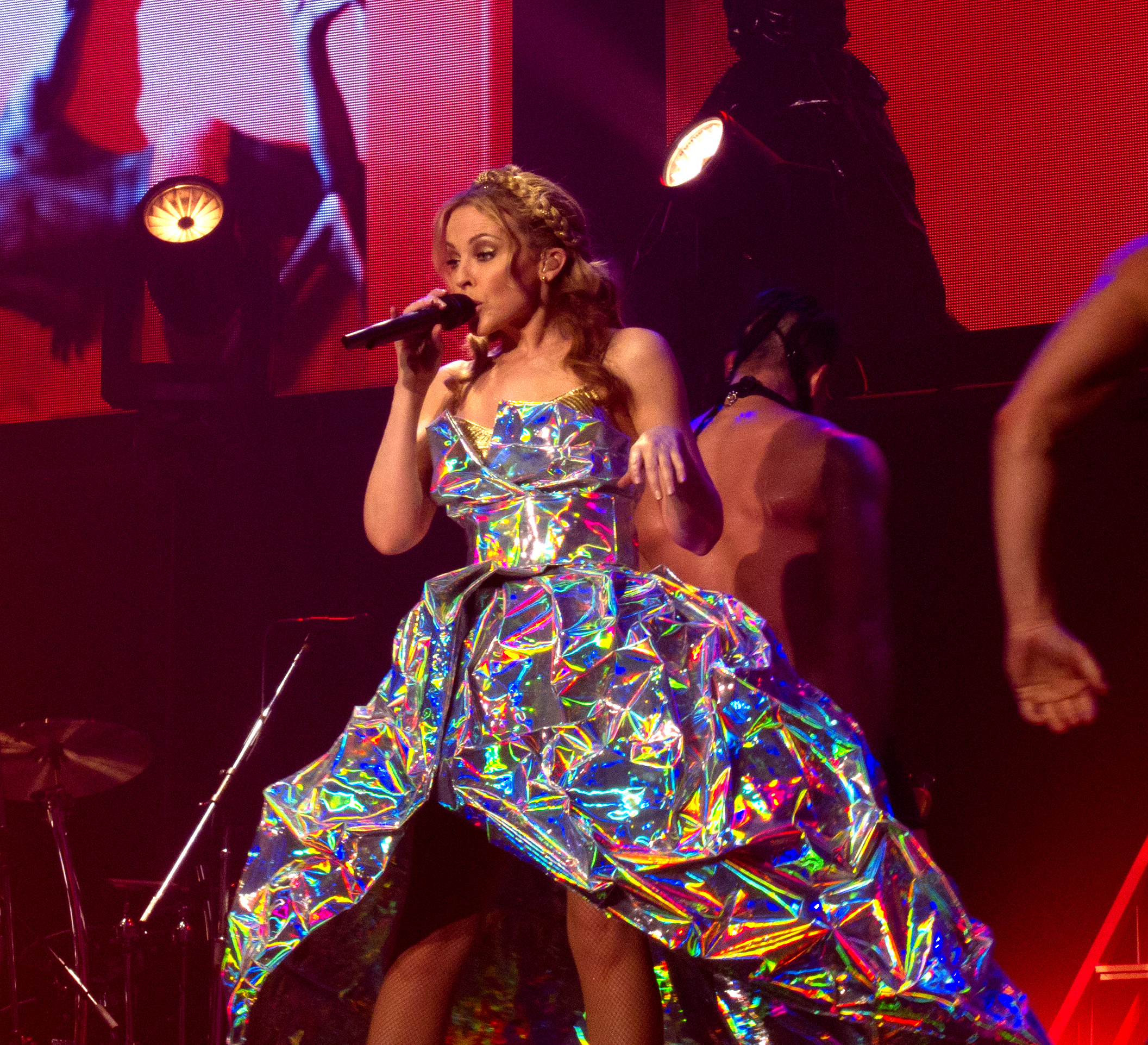
Kylie Minogue's "Can't Get You Out of My Head" topped the chart for ten consecutive weeks, and was the number-one dance single of 2001.

The ARIA Dance Chart is a chart that ranks the best-performing dance singles of Australia. It is published by Australian Recording Industry Association (ARIA), an organisation who collect music data for the weekly ARIA Charts. To be eligible to appear on the chart, the recording must be a single, and be "predominantly of a dance nature, or with a featured track of a dance nature, or included in the ARIA Club Chart or a comparable overseas chart".

In 2001, eleven singles topped the chart. Public Domain's "Operation Blade (Bass in the Place...)" had the longest-running chart-topping dance single of 2001, for thirteen non-consecutive weeks. Kylie Minogue's "Can't Get You Out of My Head" and Bardot's "I Need Somebody" were the only singles to debut at the number-one spot of the chart. Debelah Morgan's "Dance With Me" appeared on the chart for five weeks, before it was removed from the chart and listed on the newly established ARIA Urban Singles Chart. Other chart-topping dance singles from 2001 include Minogue's "Can't Get You Out of My Head", which stayed at number one for ten straight weeks, and Da Muttz's "Wassuup" which spent eight weeks atop the chart.

== Chart history ==
Key
| † | Indicates number-one dance single of 2001 |

| Issue date | Song | Artist(s) | Reference |
|---|---|---|---|
| 1 January | "Independent Women (Part 1)" | Destiny's Child | |
| 8 January | "Dance With Me" | Debelah Morgan | |
| 15 January | "Dance With Me" | Debelah Morgan | |
| 22 January | "Dance With Me" | Debelah Morgan | |
| 29 January | "Dance With Me" | Debelah Morgan | |
| 5 February | "Dance With Me" | Debelah Morgan | |
| 12 February | "Operation Blade (Bass in the Place...)" | Public Domain | |
| 19 February | "Operation Blade (Bass in the Place...)" | Public Domain | |
| 26 February | "Operation Blade (Bass in the Place...)" | Public Domain | |
| 5 March | "Operation Blade (Bass in the Place...)" | Public Domain | |
| 12 March | "Operation Blade (Bass in the Place...)" | Public Domain | |
| 19 March | "Operation Blade (Bass in the Place...)" | Public Domain | |
| 26 March | "Operation Blade (Bass in the Place...)" | Public Domain | |
| 2 April | "Operation Blade (Bass in the Place...)" | Public Domain | |
| 9 April | "Operation Blade (Bass in the Place...)" | Public Domain | |
| 16 April | "Operation Blade (Bass in the Place...)" | Public Domain | |
| 23 April | "Operation Blade (Bass in the Place...)" | Public Domain | |
| 30 April | "Operation Blade (Bass in the Place...)" | Public Domain | |
| 7 May | "What It Feels Like for a Girl" | Madonna | |
| 14 May | "What It Feels Like for a Girl" | Madonna | |
| 21 May | "Operation Blade (Bass In the Place...)" | Public Domain | |
| 28 May | "Wassuup" | Da Muttz | |
| 4 June | "Wassuup" | Da Muttz | |
| 11 June | "Wassuup" | Da Muttz | |
| 18 June | "Wassuup" | Da Muttz | |
| 25 June | "Wassuup" | Da Muttz | |
| 2 July | "Wassuup" | Da Muttz | |
| 9 July | "Wassuup" | Da Muttz | |
| 16 July | "Wassuup" | Da Muttz | |
| 23 July | "Pop" | 'N Sync | |
| 30 July | "Pop" | 'N Sync | |
| 6 August | "Just the Thing" | Paul Mac featuring Peta Morris | |
| 13 August | "Just the Thing" | Paul Mac featuring Peta Morris | |
| 20 August | "Just the Thing" | Paul Mac featuring Peta Morris | |
| 27 August | "Starlight" | The Supermen Lovers | |
| 3 September | "Starlight" | The Supermen Lovers | |
| 10 September | "Starlight" | The Supermen Lovers | |
| 17 September | "Can't Get You Out of My Head" † | Kylie Minogue | |
| 24 September | "Can't Get You Out of My Head" † | Kylie Minogue | |
| 1 October | "Can't Get You Out of My Head" † | Kylie Minogue | |
| 8 October | "Can't Get You Out of My Head" † | Kylie Minogue | |
| 15 October | "Can't Get You Out of My Head" † | Kylie Minogue | |
| 22 October | "Can't Get You Out of My Head" † | Kylie Minogue | |
| 29 October | "Can't Get You Out of My Head" † | Kylie Minogue | |
| 5 November | "Can't Get You Out of My Head" † | Kylie Minogue | |
| 12 November | "Can't Get You Out of My Head" † | Kylie Minogue | |
| 19 November | "Can't Get You Out of My Head" † | Kylie Minogue | |
| 26 November | "I Need Somebody" | Bardot | |
| 2 December | "I Need Somebody" | Bardot | |
| 10 December | "Rapture" | iiO | |
| 17 December | "Rapture" | iiO | |
| 24 December | "Rapture" | iiO | |
| 31 December | "Rapture" | iiO | |

== See also ==
- 2001 in music
- List of number-one singles of 2001 (Australia)
- List of number-one club tracks of 2001 (Australia)
