= List of UK Dance Singles Chart number ones of 2000 =

These are The Official UK Charts Company UK Dance Chart number one hits of 2000. The dates listed in the menu below represents the Saturday after the Sunday the chart was announced, as per the way the dates are given in chart publications such as the ones produced by Billboard, Guinness, and Virgin.

| Issue date | Song | Artist |
|---|---|---|
| 1 January | "A Little Bit of Luck" | DJ Luck & MC Neat |
| 8 January | "A Little Bit of Luck" | DJ Luck & MC Neat |
| 15 January | "A Little Bit of Luck" | DJ Luck & MC Neat |
| 22 January | "Rise" | Eddie Amador |
| 29 January | "Pitchin' (In Every Direction)" | Hi-Gate |
| 5 February | "Hear You Calling" | Aurora |
| 12 February | "Breathe and Stop" | Q-Tip |
| 19 February | "Must Be the Music" | Joey Negro featuring Taka Boom |
| 26 February | "I'm in Love" | Starparty |
| 4 March | "Movin' Too Fast" | Artful Dodger and Romina Johnson |
| 11 March | "Movin' Too Fast" | Artful Dodger and Romina Johnson |
| 18 March | "Stop Playing with My Mind" | Barbara Tucker |
| 25 March | "Stop Playing with My Mind" | Barbara Tucker |
| 1 April | No Chart Published | No Chart Published |
| 8 April | "Right Before My Eyes" | N'n'G featuring Kallaghan |
| 15 April | "Flowers" | Sweet Female Attitude |
| 22 April | "Toca's Miracle" | Coco Star & Fragma |
| 29 April | "Imagine (Asylum Remix)" | Shola Ama |
| 6 May | "Crazy Love" | MJ Cole |
| 13 May | "Heart of Asia" | Watergate |
| 20 May | "Tell Me Why (The Riddle)" | Paul Van Dyk featuring Saint Etienne |
| 27 May | "Masterblaster 2000" | DJ Luck & MC Neat featuring JJ |
| 3 June | "It Feels So Good" | Sonique |
| 10 June | "On the Beach" | York |
| 17 June | "Girls Like Us" | B-15 Project featuring Crissy D and Lady G |
| 24 June | "Sandstorm" | Darude |
| 1 July | "The Power of Love"(Rob Searle club mix edit) | Frankie Goes to Hollywood |
| 8 July | "Voices" | Bedrock |
| 15 July | "Beautiful" | Matt Darey featuring Marcella Woods |
| 22 July | "I Need Your Lovin (Like the Sunshine)" | Marc et Claude |
| 29 July | "Sing-A-Long" | Shanks & Bigfoot |
| 5 August | "Fly Bi" | Teebone featuring MC Kie & MC Sparks |
| 12 August | "Time to Burn" | Storm |
| 19 August | "I Feel for You" | Bob Sinclar |
| 26 August | "Groovejet (If This Ain't Love)" | Spiller featuring Sophie Ellis-Bextor |
| 2 September | "Groovejet (If This Ain't Love)" | Spiller featuring Sophie Ellis-Bextor |
| 9 September | "Freak Like Me" | Tru Faith & Dub Conspiracy |
| 16 September | "Lady (Hear Me Tonight)" | Modjo |
| 23 September | "Scorchio" | Sasha/Emerson |
| 30 September | "Kernkraft 400" | Zombie Nation |
| 7 October | "Sorry (I Didn't Know)" | Monsta Boy featuring Denzie |
| 14 October | "Silence" | Delerium featuring Sarah McLachlan |
| 21 October | "Dooms Night" | Azzido Da Bass |
| 28 October | "Pasilda" | Afro Medusa |
| 4 November | "Gettin' in the Way" | Jill Scott |
| 11 November | "Greed" / "The Man with the Red Face" | Laurent Garnier |
| 18 November | "138 Trek" | DJ Zinc |
| 25 November | "One More Time" | Daft Punk |
| 2 December | "Operation Blade (Bass in the Place...)" | Public Domain |
| 9 December | "Phatt Bass" | Warp Brothers vs. Aquagen |
| 16 December | "Dedicated to Love" | Marissa |
| 23 December | "Storm Animal" | Storm |
| 30 December | "Operation Blade (Bass in the Place...)" | Public Domain |

== See also ==
- 2000 in music
