= List of number-one singles of 2001 (Australia) =

ARIA Charts number-one singles of 2001 < 2000 2002 >

Other Australian number-one charts of 2001
- albums
- dance singles

Top Australian singles and albums of 2001
- Triple J Hottest 100
- top 25 singles
- top 25 albums

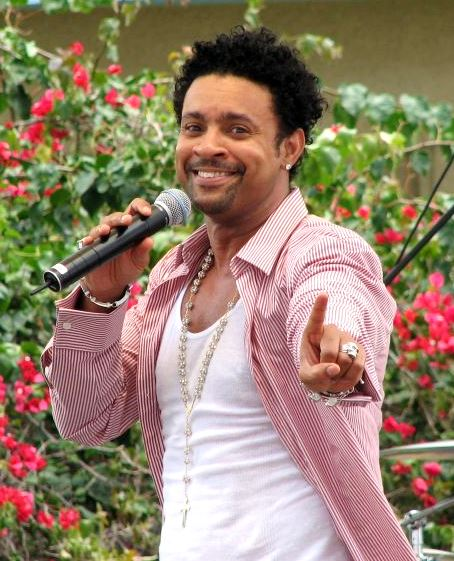
Reggae singer Shaggy had two number-one singles for 12 weeks on the top spot in a calendar year.

The Australian Top 100 Singles Chart is a chart that ranks the best-performing singles of Australia. Published by the ARIA report, the data are compiled by the Australian Recording Industry Association (ARIA) based collectively on each single's weekly physical and digital sales and airplay. In 2001, there were 14 singles that topped the chart.

In 2001, 16 acts achieved their first number-one single in Australia, either as a lead artist or featured guest, including Shaggy, Mýa, LeAnn Rimes, Lifehouse, Scandal'us, and Alien Ant Farm. Shaggy, Rayvon, Scandal'us, and Kylie Minogue were the only acts to have earned a number-one debut single this year. Reggae singer Shaggy and R&B singer Mýa had two number-one singles that reached the top-spot. During the year, five collaboration singles reached the number-one position.

Shaggy's "Angel" and Alien Ant Farm's "Smooth Criminal" were the longest-running number-one singles of 2001, remaining in that position for eight weeks. The second-longest run at number-one was "Can't Fight the Moonlight" by Leann Rimes, whose streak on the top spot reached six weeks. Another single with an extended chart run was Lifehouse's "Hanging by a Moment", which topped the chart for five weeks.

== Chart history ==
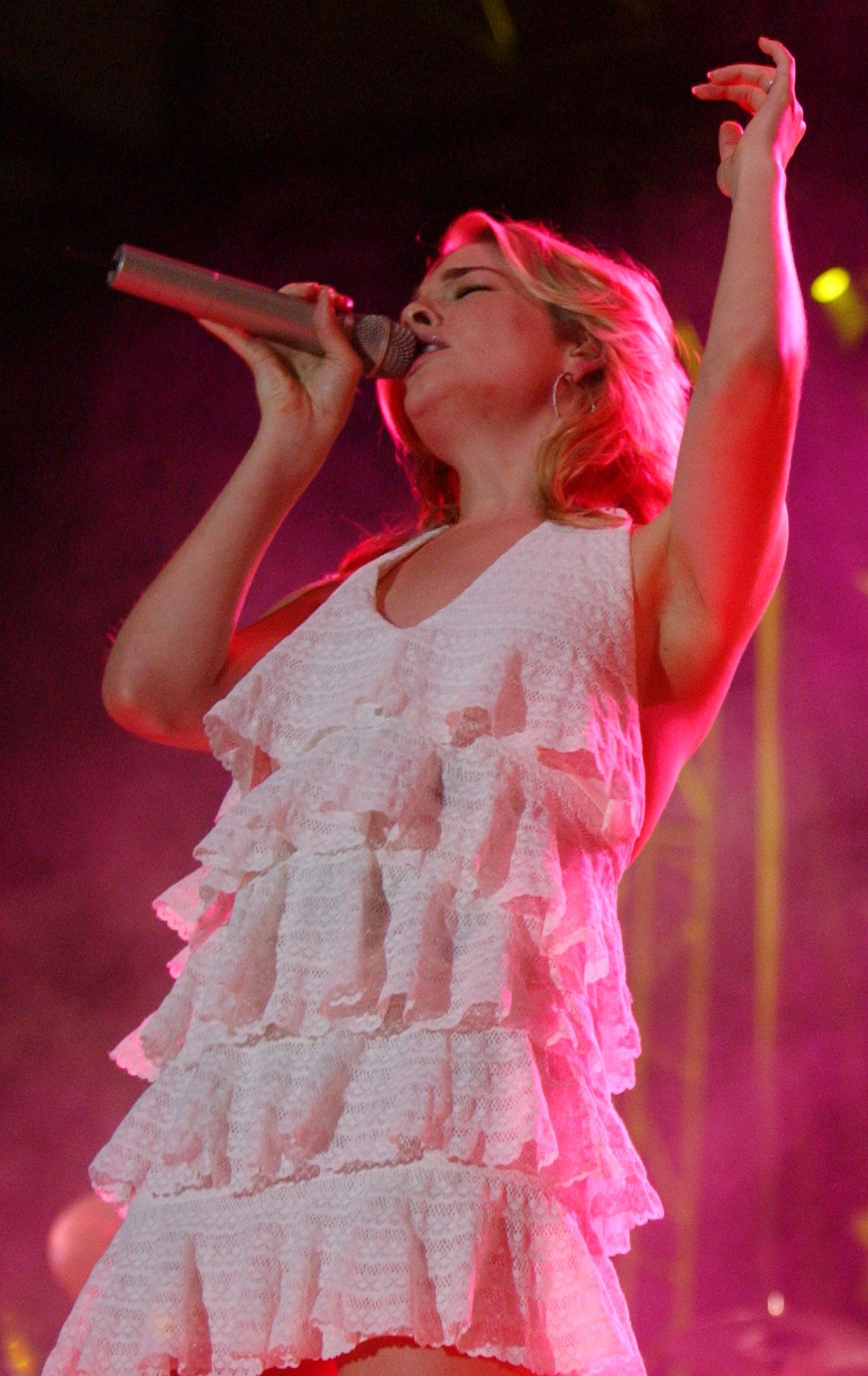
LeAnn Rimes scored her first Australian number-one single with "Can't Fight the Moonlight", which topped the chart for six weeks.

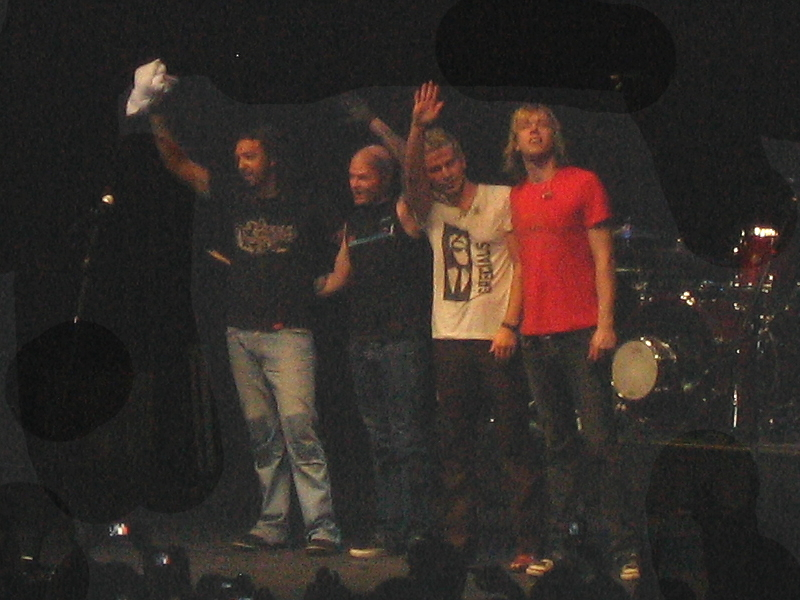
Lifehouse gained their first number-one single in Australia with their debut single "Hanging by a Moment", which stayed at the top spot for five consecutive weeks.

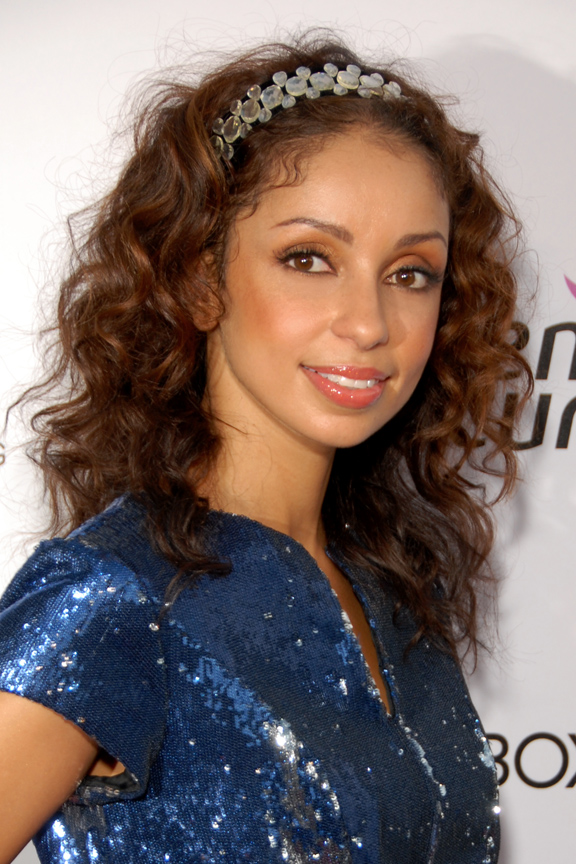
Mýa reached the top spot with two singles, as the lead artist on "Case of the Ex", which topped the chart for two weeks, and as one of four acts on "Lady Marmalade", which stayed at the top spot for three consecutive weeks.

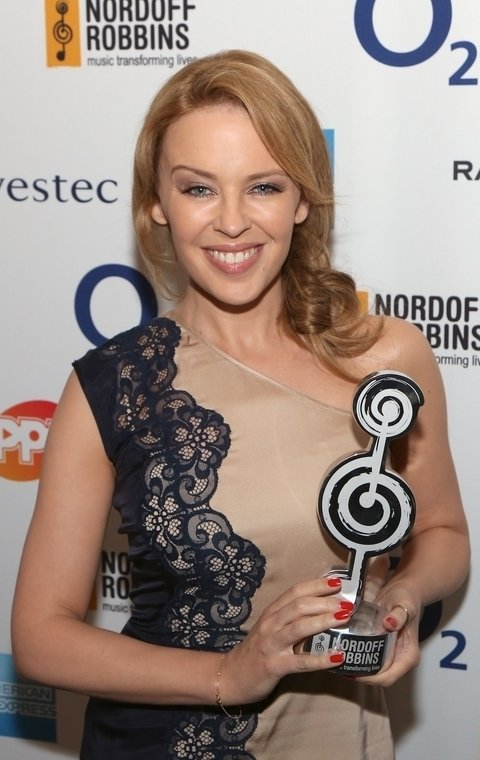
Kylie Minogue scored her seventh Australian number-one single with "Can't Get You Out of My Head", which topped the chart for four consecutive weeks.

Key
The yellow background indicates the #1 song on ARIA's End of Year Singles Chart of 2001.

| Date | Song | Artist(s) | References |
|---|---|---|---|
| 7 January | "Teenage Dirtbag" | Wheatus | |
| 14 January | "Cruisin'" | Gwyneth Paltrow and Huey Lewis | |
| 21 January | "Cruisin'" | Gwyneth Paltrow and Huey Lewis | |
| 28 January | "Can't Fight the Moonlight" | LeAnn Rimes | |
| 4 February | "Can't Fight the Moonlight" | LeAnn Rimes | |
| 11 February | "Can't Fight the Moonlight" | LeAnn Rimes | |
| 18 February | "Can't Fight the Moonlight" | LeAnn Rimes | |
| 25 February | "Can't Fight the Moonlight" | LeAnn Rimes | |
| 4 March | "Can't Fight the Moonlight" | LeAnn Rimes | |
| 11 March | "Stan" | Eminem featuring Dido | |
| 18 March | "Case of the Ex" | Mýa | |
| 25 March | "Case of the Ex" | Mýa | |
| 1 April | "It Wasn't Me" | Shaggy featuring Rikrok | |
| 8 April | "It Wasn't Me" | Shaggy featuring Rikrok | |
| 15 April | "It Wasn't Me" | Shaggy featuring Rikrok | |
| 22 April | "It Wasn't Me" | Shaggy featuring Rikrok | |
| 29 April | "Me, Myself & I" | Scandal'us | |
| 6 May | "Me, Myself & I" | Scandal'us | |
| 13 May | "Me, Myself & I" | Scandal'us | |
| 20 May | "Lady Marmalade" | Christina Aguilera, Pink, Lil' Kim and Mýa | |
| 27 May | "Lady Marmalade" | Christina Aguilera, Pink, Lil' Kim and Mýa | |
| 3 June | "Lady Marmalade" | Christina Aguilera, Pink, Lil' Kim and Mýa | |
| 10 June | "Angel" | Shaggy featuring Rayvon | |
| 17 June | "Angel" | Shaggy featuring Rayvon | |
| 24 June | "Angel" | Shaggy featuring Rayvon | |
| 1 July | "Angel" | Shaggy featuring Rayvon | |
| 8 July | "Angel" | Shaggy featuring Rayvon | |
| 15 July | "Angel" | Shaggy featuring Rayvon | |
| 22 July | "Angel" | Shaggy featuring Rayvon | |
| 29 July | "Angel" | Shaggy featuring Rayvon | |
| 5 August | "Follow Me" | Uncle Kracker | |
| 12 August | "Hanging by a Moment" | Lifehouse | |
| 19 August | "Hanging by a Moment" | Lifehouse | |
| 26 August | "Hanging by a Moment" | Lifehouse | |
| 2 September | "Hanging by a Moment" | Lifehouse | |
| 9 September | "Hanging by a Moment" | Lifehouse | |
| 16 September | "Can We Fix It?" | Bob the Builder | |
| 23 September | "Can't Get You Out of My Head" | Kylie Minogue | |
| 30 September | "Can't Get You Out of My Head" | Kylie Minogue | |
| 7 October | "Can't Get You Out of My Head" | Kylie Minogue | |
| 14 October | "Can't Get You Out of My Head" | Kylie Minogue | |
| 21 October | "Because I Got High" | Afroman | |
| 28 October | "Because I Got High" | Afroman | |
| 4 November | "Because I Got High" | Afroman | |
| 11 November | "Smooth Criminal" | Alien Ant Farm | |
| 18 November | "Smooth Criminal" | Alien Ant Farm | |
| 25 November | "Smooth Criminal" | Alien Ant Farm | |
| 2 December | "Smooth Criminal" | Alien Ant Farm | |
| 9 December | "Smooth Criminal" | Alien Ant Farm | |
| 16 December | "Smooth Criminal" | Alien Ant Farm | |
| 23 December | "Smooth Criminal" | Alien Ant Farm | |
| 30 December | "Smooth Criminal" | Alien Ant Farm | |

== Number-one artists ==
| Position | Artist | Weeks at No. 1 |
|---|---|---|
| 1 | Shaggy | 12 |
| 2 | Rayvon (as featuring) | 8 |
| 2 | Alien Ant Farm | 8 |
| 3 | LeAnn Rimes | 6 |
| 4 | Mya | 5 |
| 4 | Lifehouse | 5 |
| 5 | RikRok (as featuring) | 4 |
| 5 | Kylie Minogue | 4 |
| 5 | P!nk | 3 |
| 6 | Scandul'us | 3 |
| 6 | Christina Aguilera | 3 |
| 6 | Lil' Kim | 3 |
| 6 | Afroman | 3 |
| 7 | Gwyneth Paltrow | 2 |
| 7 | Huey Lewis | 2 |
| 8 | Eminem | 1 |
| 8 | Dido | 1 |
| 8 | Uncle Kracker | 1 |
| 8 | Bob The Builder | 1 |
| 8 | Wheatus | 1 |

Songs that peaked at number two include I'm Like A Bird by Nelly Furtado, Whole Again by Atomic Kitten, Don't Stop Movin' by S Club 7, Ms. Jackson by Outkast, How You Remind Me by Nickelback, Let's Get Married by Jagged Edge and Strawberry Kisses by Nikki Webster

Songs that peaked at number three include All Rise by Blue, Dance With Me by Debelah Morgan, Bette Davis Eyes by Gwyneth Paltrow, Purple Pills by D12 and I'm Real by Jennifer Lopez

Other hit songs included Butterfly by Crazy Town (4), With Arms Wide Open by Creed (4), Let Me Blow Ya Mind by Eve feat. Gwen Stefani (4), Operation Blade by Public Domain (7)

== See also ==
- 2001 in music
- List of top 25 singles for 2001 in Australia
- List of number-one dance singles of 2001 (Australia)

== Notes ==
- Number of number-one singles: 15
- Longest run at number one: Angel by Shaggy and Smooth Criminal by Alien Ant Farm (8 weeks)
