= Case of the Ex =

2000 single by Mýa

Single by Mýa

from the album Fear of Flying
- Written: Late 1999
- Released: July 11, 2000
- Studio: Triangle Sound (Atlanta, Georgia)
- Genre: Pop; R&B
- Length: 3:56
- Label: Interscope
- Songwriters: Christopher Stewart; Traci Hale; Thabiso "Tab" Nkhereanyne
- Producer: Christopher "Tricky" Stewart

Mýa singles chronology
"The Best of Me" (2000)	"Case of the Ex" (2000)	"Best of Me, Part 2" (2000)

Music video
- "Case of the Ex (Whatcha Gonna Do)" on YouTube

Alternative covers
- UK cover

"Case of the Ex" (sometimes subtitled "Whatcha Gonna Do") is a song performed by American singer Mýa. It was written and composed by Christopher "Tricky" Stewart (with his songwriting partners Traci Hale and Thabiso "Tab" Nkhereanyne) for Mýa's sophomore studio record, Fear of Flying (2000). The up-tempo pop-R&B track was inspired by a relationship Hale was going through at the time. It was released on July 11, 2000, as the second single from the album, following "The Best of Me" (featuring Jadakiss).

The song received mixed to positive reviews from contemporary music critics and became Mýa's breakthrough hit, both stateside and internationally. "Case of the Ex" became a top-five hit on the US Billboard Hot 100 for the week of December 2, 2000, peaking and spending three consecutive weeks at number two. Internationally, the single topped the Australian ARIA Singles Chart for two consecutive weeks in March 2001 and peaked at number three in the United Kingdom.

The accompanying music video for the single was directed by Diane Martel and choreographed by Tina Landon. The video, filmed in the Mojave Desert, featured the singer and her backup dancers performing with large poles as props, and dancing in the sand. The visuals drew comparisons to Janet Jackson's "You Want This" (1994) music video and Mel Gibson's 1979 film Mad Max. In addition, the video was nominated for a Washington Area Music Award for Video of the Year, while the song itself won in the Urban Contemporary Recording category in 2001.

== Background ==
"Case of the Ex" was composed by Christopher "Tricky" Stewart, Traci Hale, and Thabiso "Tab" Nkhereanyne in late 1999. Initially, Mýa was working at the Redzone Studios in Atlanta, Georgia, when she heard an early instrumental of the song through the walls from the room next door. She stepped out of her session and was introduced to Stewart in the next studio. Originally a rap song, Stewart rearranged the track to make it fit Mýa's persona.

Speaking of its creation, Stewart said: "We got together to write a song specifically for Mýa. We kicked around some subjects which Mýa could potentially sing. We wanted to create a lyric theme that would keep her young, yet would show that she was growing up." It was Hale who came up with the lyric idea, which was inspired by a relationship she was going through at the time and revolved around "a strong woman who won't tolerate her man returning to his ex-girlfriend." While Tab and Hale contributed most of the lyrics, Stewart wrote the music and played all of the tracks, with Hale singing on the original demo."

The initial demo also featured the percussive, keyboard hook which would become the song's musical trademark. "I followed an old philosophy, which is to try to catch the listener's attention," explained Stewart. "I wanted to make a statement with that hook, creating a special sound that people would react to and remember. It was like a loud horn blast, which was derived from a sampled sound, and then enhanced with my K-25 keyboard." Soon after completing the demo, Stewart played the song for Mýa, and she "immediately loved it." The following day, she recorded her vocals at Stewart's studio for the master version.

== Critical reception ==
"Case of the Ex" garnered mixed to positive reviews. Billboard magazine compared the song to Destiny's Child's "Jumpin', Jumpin'", and added: "With its quick-programmed drum track [...] Mýa's 'Case of the Ex' is on the right track. Production-wise, the song used some computer tricks to play with Mýa's vocals. [It] is set to be a hot track on radio and in the clubs all summer long." Music Week said the song was "sultry R&B" and that it "should help lift sales of her album Fear of Flying." Jacqueline Springer of NME gave the song seven out of ten stars, writing: "The stuttering arrangement of the original is cool and suits Mýa's brooding mood, but after a while it simply sits in the wind—there's no real build into a bassline leaving the track to run along a continuous pop/R&B vibe." Writing for Yahoo! Music UK, Gary Crossing described "Case of the Ex" as a smooth and sassy if somewhat formulaic slice of R&B.

=== Accolades ===
"Case of the Ex" was featured on The Village Voice's Pazz & Jop end of the year critics list.

Year	Ceremony	Award	Result	Ref.
2001	Washington Area Music Awards	Urban Contemporary Recording	Won	
2001	Washington Area Music Awards	Video of the Year	Nominated	

== Chart performance ==
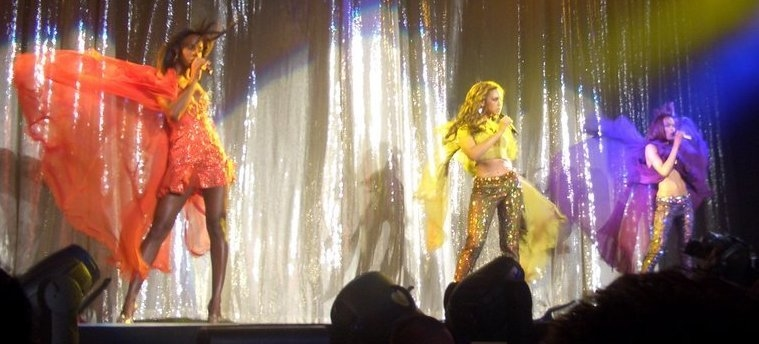
"Case of the Ex" was fended off from the number one position on Billboard Hot 100 by Destiny's Child's "Independent Women Part 1".

In the United States, "Case of the Ex" debuted at number 72 on Billboard Hot 100 in the week of August 19, 2000.^{[1]} The following week, it leaped from 72 to 57 in the week of August 26, 2000. It continued to climb the Hot 100, ascending from 42 to 31 during its sixth week, on September 23, 2000. The song reached its peak at number 2 in the week of December 2, 2000. From the weeks of December 2–16, 2000; it spent three consecutive weeks at number two. "Case of the Ex" spent 30 consecutive weeks on that chart. The song became Mýa's second non-consecutive solo top-10 hit after 1998's "It's All About Me" (featuring Sisqó). It remains Mýa's second-biggest and second-highest-charting single on the chart to date (she topped the chart the following year when the "Lady Marmalade" remake featuring her, Lil' Kim, Christina Aguilera, and Pink climbed to number one). "Case of the Ex" became a top-10 hit on Billboard's Hot R&B/Hip-Hop Singles & Tracks chart in the week of December 9, 2000, peaking at number ten and spent 28 consecutive weeks on that chart. It was Mýa's fifth and final top-10 hit on that chart.

Globally, "Case of the Ex" debuted at number five on the Australian Singles Chart on the week of February 18, 2001. It topped the chart and spent two consecutive weeks at number one, during the weeks of March 18–25, 2001. In total, the song spent 23 consecutive weeks altogether on the chart. It was certified platinum by Australian Record Industry Association for shipment of 70,000 units. In the Netherlands, the song debuted at number sixty-two during the week of October 7, 2000. It reached its peak of number eight in the week of November 4, 2000, and spent 18 consecutive weeks on the Dutch Single Top 100 chart. "Case of the Ex" peaked at number seventeen in New Zealand during the week of January 28, 2001. It debuted and peaked at number three in the United Kingdom on the week of February 10, 2001, and spent 13 consecutive weeks altogether on the chart.

== Music video ==
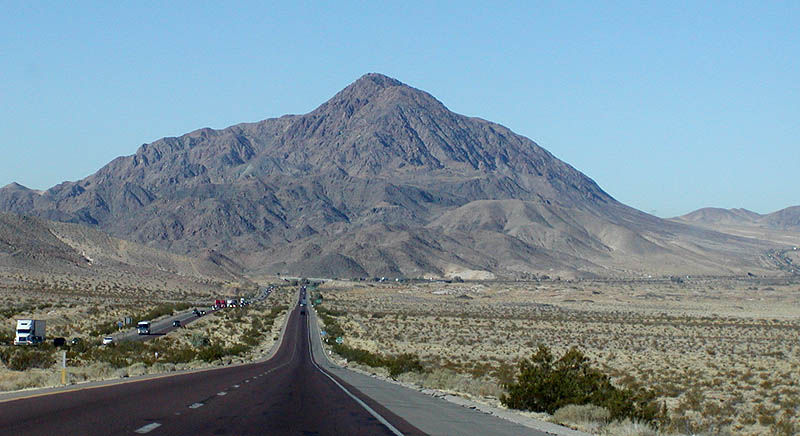
The video for "Case of the Ex" was filmed in the Mojave Desert in California.

The video for "Case of the Ex" was directed by Diane Martel and filmed at Mojave Desert in California. On filming "Case of the Ex," the singer laughed and remarked, "It was literally hell." During filming, a wardrobe malfunction had occurred on set where the studs Mya and her dancers wore didn't have lining on the opposite sides, causing the crew to get cut up on their skin, while simultaneously getting sunburnt with sand getting in their sunburns and scrapes. She noted: "So it was a very painful video regarding our skin and having to do take after take in hot weather." Mya however, gushed and shared, "It was fun because I was so excited to do these really fierce dance moves and show personality."

"Case of the Ex" music video "opens in a Mad-Maxish desert setting, where a posse of well-muscled girls stands before a group of somewhat nonplussed boys". The girls then proceed "wielding their martial-arts sticks" at the men during their dance routine. By the end of the video, Mya and her dancers exit, leaving their audience dusty and on their own. Cynthia Fuchs from PopMatters compared the video to "Say You'll Be There" by the Spice Girls and "You Want This" by Janet Jackson. The video first premiered on BET the week ending on June 26, 2000, later airing on MTV the week ending on July 24, 2000.

== Live performances ==
Mya performed "Case of the Ex" on multiple talk shows. On July 10, 2000, she performed "Case of the Ex" on Farmclub.com. In September 2000, she performed the song on BET's 106 & Park. On October 23, 2000, she performed onTotal Request Live. The following month, November 6 and 11 on The Tonight Show with Jay Leno and Soul Train. In December 2000, she performed the song on MTV's Fashionably Loud and The Queen Latifah Show. On February 28, 2001, she hosted and performed at 2001 Soul Train Music Awards. In 2025, Mya performed the song at the BET Awards 2025 during the shows's opening segment, oding 106 & Park and its 25th-anniversary celebration.

== Legacy ==
British girl group IV Rox re-recorded "Case of the Ex" and released it as their debut single. Their version was featured on the group's debut EP Imperfections (2015). Impressed by their cover, Mýa has expressed her appreciation and tweeted, "Lovely job ladies~xoxo." With their version, the group auditioned for series 11 of The X Factor and received a standing ovation. Out magazine included "Case of the Ex" as one of their most empowering, memorable and influential all-girl dance routines list. VH1 recognized "Case of the Ex" in their list of Best R&B Music Video Choreography of the 1990s and 2000s. Writing for Pitchfork, Marc Hogan suggested "Case of the Ex" as one of his choices for his 6 Millennium Era Hits That Top 40 Needs to Sample list, commenting, "A clear-voiced young singer with a strong sense of identity like Kehlani (or maybe Halsey in a pinch) could work wonders here." Billboard ranked "Case of the Ex" as one their 100 Greatest Songs of 2000 list. In September 2020, Spin magazine ranked "Case of the Ex" at number 19 on their "50 Greatest Songs of 2000" list. In January 2024, Rolling Stone magazine ranked "Case of the Ex" as one of their "The 100 Greatest R&B Songs of the 21st Century" list.

== Track listings ==
US CD single

1. "Case of the Ex" (radio edit) – 3:35
2. "Case of the Ex" (LP version) – 3:56
3. "Case of the Ex" (instrumental) – 4:14

US 12-inch single

A1. "Case of the Ex (Whatcha Gonna Do)" (radio edit) – 3:52
A2. "Case of the Ex (Whatcha Gonna Do)" (LP version) – 3:56
B1. "Case of the Ex (Whatcha Gonna Do)" (instrumental) – 4:14
B2. "Case of the Ex (Whatcha Gonna Do)" (acappella) – 3:55

UK CD single

1. "Case of the Ex" (radio edit) – 3:56
2. "Case of the Ex" (Sovereign Remix) – 5:40
3. "Ghetto Supastar (That Is What You Are)" (with Pras Michel featuring Ol' Dirty Bastard) (main version) – 4:26
4. "Case of the Ex" (CD-ROM video)

UK 12-inch single

A1. "Case of the Ex" – 3:56
A2. "Case of the Ex" (O.M.O. 2-step mix) – 3:57
B1. "Case of the Ex" (Sovereign Remix) – 5:40

UK cassette single

1. "Case of the Ex" – 3:56
2. "Ghetto Supastar (That Is What You Are)" (main version) – 4:26

European CD single

1. "Case of the Ex" (radio edit)
2. "Case of the Ex" (O.M.O. 2-step mix)

Australian CD single

1. "Case of the Ex" (radio edit)
2. "Case of the Ex" (O.M.O. 2-step mix)
3. "Take Me There" (with Blackstreet featuring Mase and Blinky Blink) (soundtrack LP version)
4. "Ghetto Supastar" (soundtrack LP version)

== Credits and personnel ==
Credits are adapted from the liner notes of Fear of Flying.

=== Recording ===
- Recorded at Triangle Sound Studios (Atlanta, Georgia)
- Mixed at Larrabee North (North Hollywood, California)

=== Personnel ===
- Christopher "Tricky" Stewart – production, programming, keyboards
- Traci Hale – background vocals
- Brian "B-Luv" Thomas – recording engineer
- Kevin "KD" Davis – mixing

== Charts ==
=== Weekly charts ===
Weekly chart performance for "Case of the Ex"
Chart (2000–2001)	Peak position
Australia (ARIA)	1
Australian Urban (ARIA)	1
Belgium (Ultratop 50 Flanders)	16
Belgium (Ultratop 50 Wallonia)	26
Canada Top Singles (RPM)	14 (Note: "Case of the Ex" reached number 14 when RPM ceased publication in November 2000.)
Canada Airplay (BDS)	6
Europe (Eurochart Hot 100)	13
France (SNEP)	29
Germany (GfK)	39
Ireland (IRMA)	12
Netherlands (Dutch Top 40)	7
Netherlands (Single Top 100)	8
New Zealand (Recorded Music NZ)	17
Scottish Singles Sales (Official Charts)	15
Switzerland (Schweizer Hitparade)	72
UK Singles (Official Charts)	3
UK Dance (Official Charts)	2
UK Hip Hop/R&B (Official Charts)	1
US Billboard Hot 100	2
US Hot R&B/Hip-Hop Songs (Billboard)	10
US Pop Airplay (Billboard)	3
US Rhythmic Airplay (Billboard)	1

=== Year-end charts ===
2000 year-end chart performance for "Case of the Ex"
Chart (2000)	Position
Netherlands (Dutch Top 40)	32
Netherlands (Single Top 100)	64
US Billboard Hot 100	72
US Hot R&B/Hip-Hop Singles & Tracks (Billboard)	87
US Mainstream Top 40 (Billboard)	82
US Rhythmic Top 40 (Billboard)	17

2001 year-end chart performance for "Case of the Ex"
Chart (2001)	Position
Australia (ARIA)	11
Australian Urban (ARIA)	4
Belgium (Ultratop 50 Flanders)	91
Netherlands (Dutch Top 40)	160
UK Singles (OCC)	107
UK Urban (Music Week)	39
US Billboard Hot 100	40
US Mainstream Top 40 (Billboard)	26
US Rhythmic Top 40 (Billboard)	61

== Certifications ==
Certifications and sales for "Case of the Ex"
Region	Certification	Certified units/sales
Australia (ARIA)	Platinum	70,000^{^}
New Zealand (RMNZ)	Gold	15,000^{‡}
United Kingdom (BPI)	Silver	200,000^{‡}
^{^} Shipments figures based on certification alone.^{‡} Sales+streaming figures based on certification alone.

== Release history ==
Release dates and formats for "Case of the Ex"
Region	Release date	Format(s)	Label	Ref.
United States	July 11, 2000	Urban contemporary radio	Interscope	
United States	July 18, 2000	Rhythmic contemporary radio	Interscope	
United States	August 28, 2000	12-inch vinyl	Interscope	
United States	September 19, 2000	Contemporary hit radio	Interscope	
Germany	September 26, 2000	CD	Interscope	
United States	November 14, 2000	Maxi-CD; CD	Interscope	
United Kingdom	January 29, 2001	12-inch vinyl; CD; cassette	Interscope	
Australia	February 5, 2001	CD	Interscope	

== See also ==
- List of number-one singles of 2001 (Australia)
- List of Top 25 singles for 2001 in Australia
- List of number-one urban singles of 2001 (Australia)
- List of UK R&B Singles Chart number ones of 2001
- List of UK top 10 singles in 2001
- List of Billboard Rhythmic number-one songs of the 2000s
- List of Billboard Hot 100 top 10 singles in 2000
- List of Billboard Hot 100 top 10 singles in 2001
