= List of UK R&B Singles Chart number ones of 2000 =

The UK R&B Chart is a weekly chart that ranks the 40 biggest-selling singles and albums that are classified in the R&B genre in the United Kingdom. The chart is compiled by the Official Charts Company, and is based on physical and other physical formats. This is a list of the UK's biggest R&B hits of 2000.

== Number ones ==
Key
| † | Best-selling R&B single of the year |

| Issue date | Single | Artist |
|---|---|---|
| 2 January | "I Try" | Macy Gray |
| 9 January | "I Try" | Macy Gray |
| 16 January | "U Know What's Up" | Donnell Jones |
| 23 January | "U Know What's Up" | Donnell Jones |
| 30 January ^{[a]} | "Rise" | Gabrielle |
| 6 February ^{[a]} | "Rise" | Gabrielle |
| 13 February | "Rise" | Gabrielle |
| 20 February | "Rise" | Gabrielle |
| 27 February | "Caught Out There" | Kelis |
| 5 March | "Satisfy You" | Puff Daddy featuring R. Kelly |
| 12 March | "Satisfy You" | Puff Daddy featuring R. Kelly |
| 19 March | "Still D.R.E." | Dr. Dre featuring Snoop Dogg |
| 26 March ^{[a]} | "Never Be the Same Again" | Melanie C featuring Lisa "Left Eye" Lopes |
| 2 April | "Never Be the Same Again" | Melanie C featuring Lisa "Left Eye" Lopes |
| 9 April ^{[a]} | "Fill Me In" | Craig David |
| 16 April | "Thong Song" | Sisqó |
| 23 April | "Fill Me In" | Craig David |
| 30 April | "Fill Me In" | Craig David |
| 7 May | "Thong Song" | Sisqó |
| 14 May | "Thong Song" | Sisqó |
| 21 May | "Thong Song" | Sisqó |
| 28 May | "Taken for Granted" | Sia |
| 4 June | "Shackles (Praise You)" | Mary Mary |
| 11 June | "Mama Who Da Man" | Richard Blackwood |
| 18 June | "Shackles (Praise You)" | Mary Mary |
| 25 June | "Ghetto Romance" | Damage |
| 2 July ^{[a]} | "The Real Slim Shady" | Eminem |
| 9 July | "The Real Slim Shady" | Eminem |
| 16 July | "The Real Slim Shady" | Eminem |
| 23 July | "Jumpin', Jumpin'" | Destiny's Child |
| 30 July ^{[a]} | "7 Days" | Craig David |
| 6 August | "7 Days" | Craig David |
| 13 August | "7 Days" | Craig David |
| 20 August | "7 Days" | Craig David |
| 27 August | "7 Days" | Craig David |
| 3 September | "7 Days" | Craig David |
| 10 September | "It Doesn't Matter" | Wyclef Jean featuring The Rock & Melky Sedeck |
| 17 September | "It Doesn't Matter" | Wyclef Jean featuring The Rock & Melky Sedeck |
| 24 September | "Most Girls" | Pink |
| 1 October | "Tell Me" | Melanie B. |
| 8 October | "The Way I Am" | Eminem |
| 15 October | "I Wish" | R. Kelly |
| 22 October | "Body II Body" | Samantha Mumba |
| 29 October ^{[a]} | "Holler"/"Let Love Lead the Way" | The Spice Girls |
| 5 November | "Holler"/"Let Love Lead the Way" | The Spice Girls |
| 12 November | "Country Grammar" | Nelly |
| 19 November | "Gravel Pit" | Wu-Tang Clan featuring Paulissa Moorman |
| 26 November ^{[a]} | "Independent Women" | Destiny's Child |
| 3 December | "Independent Women" | Destiny's Child |
| 10 December ^{[a]} | "Stan" † | Eminem |
| 17 December | "Stan" † | Eminem |
| 24 December | "Stan" † | Eminem |
| 31 December | "Stan" † | Eminem |

== Notes ==
- ^{a} - The single was simultaneously number one on the UK Singles Chart.

== See also ==
- List of UK Dance Singles Chart number ones of 2000
- List of UK Independent Singles Chart number ones of 2000
- List of UK Rock & Metal Singles Chart number ones of 2000
- List of UK R&B Albums Chart number ones of 2000
