= Warp Brothers =

German electronic dance music group

Warp Brothers is the electronic dance music group started by German DJs Oliver Goedicke and Jürgen Dohr in 1999. Their style includes house, trance, breakbeat and electro in early days, lately hard dance, trance and psytrance.

At the beginning of their career their most successful hits were "Phatt Bass", "We Will Survive" and "Blast the Speakers", which charted in several countries.

The original version of "Phatt Bass" was by Warp Brothers vs. Aquagen, based on New Order's "Confusion" (Pump Panel Reconstruction Mix), and should not be confused with Public Domain's "Operation Blade", which was based on the same song. "Blast the Speakers" was featured on the 2005 techno album Radikal Techno 6.

In 2010 Jürgen Dohr left the group. In 2015 Peter Sildegren is joining Oliver Goedicke and making come back for Warp Brothers.

The success of “Phatt Bass 2016” vs. Wolfpack (#1 at Beatport and amongst the three most played club and festival tunes of the year) gave them support from Armin Van Buuren, Tiesto, Afrojack, David Guetta, Hardwell, W&W, and Dash Berlin.

== Singles ==
- 2000: "Phatt Bass" (vs. Aquagen)
- 2001: "We Will Survive"
- 2002: "Blast the Speakers"
- 2002: "The Power"
- 2002: "Cokane"
- 2003: "Going Insane" (feat. Red Monkey)
- 2005: "Phatt Bass"
- 2006: "Push Up"
- 2007: "Dominator"
- 2008: "Phatt Bass" (vs. Ali Payami)
- 2016: "Phatt Bass" (vs. Wolfpack)
- 2017: "Cokane"
- 2018: "Husten" (vs. Dj Bonebreaker)
- 2018: "Time & Space"
- 2019: "Warped Jump"
- 2019: "Ska Train" (vs. Dj Quicksilver feat. The Beatmasters)
- 2020: "Dreamworld" (vs. Pablo Quinones)
- 2021: "Trippin In Goa"
- 2021: "Kanlaon" (with Maharlika Muiska)

== Selected discography ==
- Warp 10 (2002)
- Warp Factor (2003)
- TranzWorld, Vol. 6.0 (2003)
- TranzWorld, Vol. 7 (2004)
- TranzWorld, Vol. 8 (2004)
- TranzWorld, Vol. 9 (2005)
- Live in Sydney (2005)
- Big in Japan (2006)

== Remixes ==
Aquagen - Lovemachine (Warp Brothers remix)	2000
Avancada - Jump Pump Break (Warp Brothers Terror Horns Remix)	2000
Modem - Contact (We Gotta Connect) (Warp Brothers Remix)	2000
Norman Bass - How U Like Bass (Warp Brothers Remix)	2000
Airheadz - Stanley (Here I Am) (Warp Brothers Mix)	2001
Black Spider - Save Your Life (Warp Brothers Club mix)	2001
Brooklyn Bounce - Born To Bounce (Warp Brothers Remix)	2001
Balloon - Bad And Sexy (Warp Brothers Remix)	2001
Balloon - Techno Rocker (Warp Brothers Remix)	2001
Fragma - You Are Alive (Warp Brothers Remix)	2001
Lavidium - Space (Warp Brothers Remix)	2001
Pep'N Up - Time & Space (Warp Brothers Remix)	2001
Stargazers - Anybody Out There (Warp Brothers Remix)	2001
Stone Phazers - John Wayne (Warp Brothers Remix)	2001
OT Quartet - Hold That Sucker Down (Warp Brothers Remix)	2001
Akira Yamamoto - Searchin' for The Light (Warp Brothers Remix)	2002
Ayumi Hamasaki - Still Alone (Warp Brothers Remix)	2002
Blizzard Brothers - Thunderstruck (Warp Brothers Remix)	2002
D.O.N.S. - Sharp as a Knife (Warp Brothers Remix)	2002
D.O.N.S. - Sharp as a Knife (Warp Brothers Less Vox Mix)	2002
DJ Bonebreaker - Husten! (Warp Brothers Remix)	2002
Dream - Get Over (Warp Brothers Remix)	2002
Groove Coverage - Moonlight Shadows (Warp Brothers Remix)	2002
JFK - Good God (Warp Brothers Remix)	2002
Kriminal Sputnik - Let's Take Break (Warp Brothers Remix)	2002
L'na - Urgent (Warp Brothers Remix)	2002
Mac & Mac - Wicked Wild (Warp Brothers Power Plant Remix)	2002
Perfect Phase - Slammer Jammer (Warp Brothers Remix)	2002
Robbie Rivera - The Hum Melody (Warp Brothers Remix)	2002
Ultrasonic - Annihilating Rhythm (Part 2) (Warp Brothers Remix)	2002
Floorfilla - Anthem 6 (Warp Brothers Remix)	2003
Bad Habbit Boys - King Of Trash (Warp Brothers Remix)	2004
Kadoc - The Nighttrain [Warp Brothers Remix]	2004
Quake Project - U.T.O. (United Trance Outlaws) (Warp Brothers Remix)	2004
Warp Brothers pres. Damient O Connor - On A Trip	2004
Brooklyn Bounce - Sex, Bass & Rock'n'Roll (Warp Brothers Remix Edit)	2005
Brooklyn Bounce - Sex, Bass & Rock'n'Roll (Warp Brothers Remix)	2005
Hypertrophy - Just Come Back 2 Me 2005 (Warp Brothers Remix)	2005
C-90 feat. Red Monkey - Yo DJ! (Warp Brothers Remix)	2006
Kadoc - U Got To Be There (Warp Brothers Remix)	2006
Melissa Tkautz - Glamorous Life (Warp Brothers Remix)	2006
No Name - I'm Your Dj (Warp Brothers Remix)	2006
E Nomine - Mitternacht (Warp Brothers Remix)	2007
666 - Exit The Arena (Warp Brothers Remix)	2017
Dj Quicksilver & Warp Brothers feat The Beatmasters - Ska Train (Warp Brothers Remix)	2019
