= Dance with Me (Debelah Morgan album) =

Studio album by Debelah Morgan
- Released: August 15, 2000
- Genre: Pop; R&B
- Length: 47:38
- Label: DAS; Atlantic
- Producer: Debelah Morgan; Giloh Morgan

Debelah Morgan chronology
It's Not Over (1998)	Dance with Me (2000)	Light at the End of the Tunnel (2005)

Singles from Dance with Me
- 1. "Dance with Me" Released: June 19, 2000; 2. "I Remember" Released: February 12, 2001

Dance with Me is the third album by American singer Debelah Morgan. It was released by DAS Entertainment and Atlantic Records on August 15, 2000, in the United States. Morgan collaborated with brother Giloh on production and songwriting credits on Dance with Me. The album was preceded by its title track which became a worldwide top ten hit.

== Critical reception ==
Professional ratings
Review scores
Source	Rating
AllMusic	3/5 stars
USA Today	2.5/4 stars
Yahoo! Music UK	5/10

AllMusic editor MacKenzie Wilson called Dance with Me "a fresh, quick-stepping dance-oriented album [with] a simple urban spin on R&B grooves and sultry hip-hop beats [...] A definitive musical maturation is pretty obvious from her previous material, and Morgan stays sassy with upbeat songs about adoration and the lovelorn [...] Dance with Me is sheer, decent, and carefree in the sense that Debelah Morgan made a solid record with the idea of doing it only for herself."

== Track listing ==
All tracks are written by Debelah Morgan and Giloh Morgan; co-writers are indicated.

No.	Title	Co-writer(s)	Length
1.	"Dance with Me"	Richard Adler, Jerry Ross	3:40
2.	"I Remember"		3:57
3.	"Close to You"		4:50
4.	"Let's Get It On"		3:36
5.	"I Can't Stop Loving You"		3:56
6.	"Take the Rain Away"		3:26
7.	"What Would You Do"		4:17
8.	"Think of You (Intro)"		0:35
9.	"Think of You"		3:31
10.	"Baby I Need Your Love"	Herschel Boone	3:56
11.	"Bring Back the Sun"		3:58
12.	"Come and Danz"		3:41
13.	"Alright"		4:29

US/European bonus track
No.	Title	Length
14.	"Fall in Love Again"	5:04

Australian/Japanese bonus tracks
No.	Title	Length
14.	"Fall in Love Again"	5:04
15.	"Don't Get Me Started"	3:48

US CD reissue bonus tracks/Digital edition
No.	Title	Length
14.	"I Remember" (Darkchild Remix 01 Extended)	4:09
15.	"Close to You" (Lover's Bonus Track)	4:01

German CD reissue bonus tracks
No.	Title	Length
14.	"I Remember" (Darkchild Remix 01 Extended)	4:09
15.	"Close to You" (Lover's Bonus Track)	4:01
16.	"Baila Conmigo" (Dance With Me)	3:40

== Charts ==
Chart (2000)	Peak position
Australian Albums (ARIA)	20
Austrian Albums (Ö3 Austria)	62
German Albums (Offizielle Top 100)	53
New Zealand Albums (RMNZ)	39
Swiss Albums (Schweizer Hitparade)	64
US Heatseekers Albums (Billboard)	35
