= Mani Hoffman =

French singer, songwriter and music producer

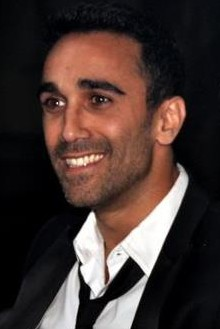
- Hoffman in 2012

Background information
- Born: December 18, 1975 (age 50); France
- Genres: French house, electronic music, pop music
- Occupations: Singer, songwriter, music producer
- Years active: 2000s–present
- Labels: BMG, Sony, Warner Music, Angelic Union, My Major Company
- Formerly of: Mani

Mani Hoffman (born 18 December 1975) is a French singer, songwriter and music producer.

== Career ==
In 2001, Hoffman collaborated with The Supermen Lovers. He co-wrote the platinum hit, "Starlight", with Guillaume Atlan, and is the lead singer on the song. It became one of the most exported French tracks around the world, and made Mani an important figure of French Touch movement along with Daft Punk, Cassius, Modjo and others. Over the next few years, Mani worked with French and British house/electro artists, such as DJ Cole, DJ Fudge, Trouble Men, Frank Roger, School, Junior Jack, and JC Sindress and Bel Amour. During this time, Mani signed with multiple labels, such as BMG, Sony, and Warner Music.

In 2006, Hoffman released another big hit, "Lucy", with the band, Jealousy, which was in the Top 20 in UK. While in the UK, he collaborated with Toby Smith, founder of the group Jamiroquai, and was also signed by his label, Angelic Union.

Mani Hoffman has also been involved with film scoring. In 2009, he wrote and sang on the original soundtrack for the film, R.T.T., starring Kad Merad and Mélanie Doutey. He also composed for the French television music, mockumentary series, Zak, broadcast on Orange Movie Series since November 2011.

In January 2012, the group Mani (group) released their debut album, Heroes of Today, with the first single, "Bang Bang", produced by the community label My Major Company. The group formed in 2007 with Tony le Guern (keyboard and arranger), Paco (guitar), and his childhood friends, Ben Durand (bass), and Stan Augris (drums), who were originally part of the group Mainstreet. "Bang Bang" was a global radio hit, and was in the Top 10 of the airplay and video play charts in France, Belgium, and Switzerland, and the No. 2 airplay single in Japan in 2013. It was also featured in the Samsung Galaxy commercial there.

Also in 2012, Mani composed and performed the track, Une chose à la fois, with Petula Clark.

== Personal life ==
Mani Hoffman was born in Nantes, France, to Jewish refugees from Algeria. At age 8, his family moved to Paris.

== Discography ==
- 2000 - Bel amour - Bel amour
- 2000 – SCHOOL – Ain't no love
- 2001 – SHADE OF SOUL feat. MANI HOFFMAN – Our Music
- 2001 – THE SUPERMEN LOVERS feat. MANI HOFFMAN – Starlight
- 2002 – THE SUPERMEN LOVERS feat. MANI HOFFMAN – THE PLAYER – Intro
- 2002 – THE SUPERMEN LOVERS feat. MANI HOFFMAN – THE PLAYER – Material World
- 2002 – SCHOOL – If
- 2002 – SHADE OF SOUL feat. MANI HOFFMAN – Nu Stance
- 2002 – WORK FOR BEAUTY – The Thing
- 2003 – MANI HOFFMAN & THE MILK BROTHERS – Don't Stop
- 2003 – TROUBLEMEN feat. MANI HOFFMAN – Deep in my soul
- 2005 – FRANK ROGER feat. MANI HOFFMAN – Right make it right
- 2005 – DJ FUDGE feat. MANI HOFFMAN – Keep On
- 2006 – DJ FUDGE feat. MANI HOFFMAN – Chasing Love
- 2006 – DJ FUDGE feat. MANI HOFFMAN – Nightglows
- 2006 – DJ FLEX feat. MANI HOFFMAN – Getaway
- 2006 – JEALOUSY – Lucy
- 2007 – JEALOUSY – Sing
- 2008 – DJ FUDGE feat. MANI HOFFMAN – Liv & Love
- 2008 – BEAT ASSAILANT feat. MANI HOFFMAN & JRF – Better Than Us
- 2009 – FRANK ROGER feat. MANI HOFFMAN – Dangerous girl
- 2009 – MM'S feat. MANI HOFFMAN – RTT (B.O.F) – Where do you go ?
- 2009 – MM'S feat. MANI HOFFMAN – RTT (B.O.F) – It is you
- 2009 – MM'S feat. MANI HOFFMAN – RTT (B.O.F) – You're the kinda girl
- 2010 – AVI ELMAN & DANNY J feat. MANI HOFFMAN – Love is Not For Hire
- 2011 – IDAN K & THE MOVEMENT OF RHYTHM feat. MANI HOFFMAN – Better man
- 2012 – DJ FUDGE & EZEL feat. MANI HOFFMAN – Call My Name
- 2012 – TELEKA & MM'S feat. MANI, THE FOREIGN BEGGARS & REEMSTARR – Legacy
- 2012 – UNION feat. MANI HOFFMAN – Baby Mama
- 2012 – PETULA CLARK feat. MANI – Une chose à la fois
- 2012 – COMBOSTAR feat. MANI HOFFMAN – Free
- 2012 – ALEX KASSEL feat. MANI HOFFMAN – Put your money where your mouth is
- 2012 – MANI, "Heroes of Today"
- 2013 – BANG, BANG single No. 2 in Japan airplay
- 2014 – BIG SHOTS used as Heineken worldwide holiday campaign
- 2015 – BETTER HALF single release by Dos Bandidos
- 2015 – RABID ANIMALS feat. THE LEONS, included in The Transporter Refueled
