= Ingo Appelt (comedian) =

German comedian

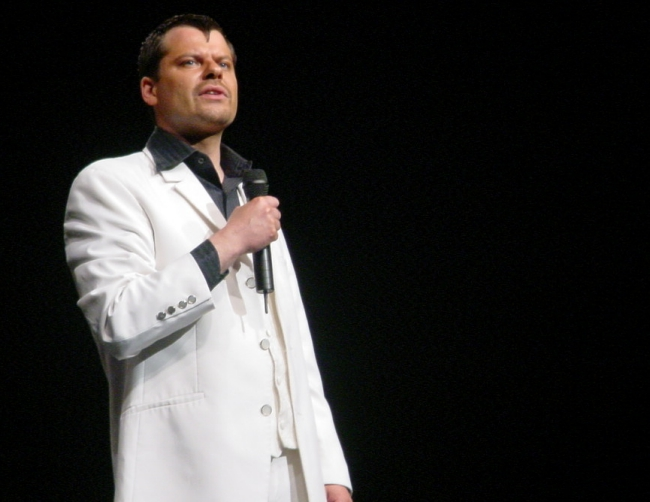
Ingo Appelt, 2004

Ingo Appelt (born 20 April 1967) is a German comedian.

== Life ==
Appelt was born in Essen. His stepfather was German football player Günter Fürhoff. Appelt lived during his childhood in Würzburg. He works as a comedian on German television. Appelt worked in different German comedyshows, for example in 7 Tage, 7 Köpfe, Freitag Nacht News, in RTL Samstag Nacht or in Quatsch Comedy Club on television broadcaster ProSieben. Appelt is member of German party Social Democratic Party of Germany. He currently lives with his wife Sonia Appelt in Berlin.

== Works ==
=== Books ===
- 2008: Männer muss man schlagen (German)

=== Singles ===
- 2000: Tanz für mich (with Aquagen)

=== Albums ===
- 1997: Der Abräumer
- 1998: Feuchte Seite
- 2004: Schlicht Böse
- 2004: Superstar
- 2008: Männer muss man schlagen
- 2011: Frauen sind Göttinnen – Wir können nur noch beten
