= The Player (The Supermen Lovers album) =

Studio album by The Supermen Lovers
- Released: 1 March 2002
- Genres: French house; tech house; funky house
- Label: BMG
- Producer: Guillaume Atlan

Singles from The Player
- 1. "Starlight" Released: 17 March 2001; 2. "Hard Stuff (Get Your Ticket for a Ride)" Released: 2002

The Player is the debut studio album by French house act The Supermen Lovers, released on 1 March 2002 by record label BMG. It reached number 96 in the French charts and contains the 2001 single "Starlight". A second single, "Hard Stuff (Get Your Ticket for a Ride)", was released the following year.

== Release ==
The Player was released in 2002 by record label BMG. It reached number 96 in the French charts.

== Track listing ==
The Player track listing
No.	Title	Length
1.	"Intro"	1:18
2.	"Superflight"	4:27
3.	"Hard Stuff"	4:47
4.	"Starlight"	6:00
5.	"Party'z Up"	5:31
6.	"Material World"	4:24
7.	"Dance with You"	10:35
8.	"Diamonds for Her"	5:42
9.	"White Hands"	4:58
10.	"Rockin' Urgence"	5:56
11.	"Family Business"	4:52
12.	"Starter"	1:41
13.	"Marathon Man"	6:19
14.	"The Score"	4:23

Japanese edition bonus track
No.	Title	Length
15.	"Starlight" (Radio Edit)	3:49
