= List of number-one urban albums of 2002 (Australia) =

ARIA Charts number-one urban albums of 2002 < 2001 2003 >

Other Australian number-one charts of 2002
- albums
- singles
- dance singles

Top Australian singles and albums of 2002
- Triple J Hottest 100
- top 25 singles
- top 25 albums

This is a list of albums that reached number-one on the ARIA Urban Albums Chart in 2002. The ARIA Urban Albums Chart is a weekly chart that ranks the best-performing urban albums in Australia. It is published by the Australian Recording Industry Association (ARIA), an organisation that collects music data for the weekly ARIA Charts. To be eligible to appear on the chart, the recording must be an album of a predominantly urban nature.

== Chart history ==
Issue date	Album	Artist(s)	Reference
7 January	J.Lo	Jennifer Lopez	
14 January	Hot Shot	Shaggy	
21 January	Hot Shot	Shaggy	
28 January	Urban Hymns Volume 3	Various Artists	
4 February	8701	Usher	
11 February	8701	Usher	
18 February	8701	Usher	
25 February	8701	Usher	
4 March	Songs in A Minor	Alicia Keys	
11 March	Songs in A Minor	Alicia Keys	
18 March	Songs in A Minor	Alicia Keys	
25 March	Songs in A Minor	Alicia Keys	
1 April	Songs in A Minor	Alicia Keys	
8 April	Songs in A Minor	Alicia Keys	
15 April	Songs in A Minor	Alicia Keys	
22 April	Pain Is Love	Ja Rule	
29 April	Pain Is Love	Ja Rule	
6 May	Pain Is Love	Ja Rule	
13 May	Pain Is Love	Ja Rule	
20 May	Pain Is Love	Ja Rule	
27 May	Pain Is Love	Ja Rule	
3 June	The Eminem Show	Eminem	
10 June	The Eminem Show	Eminem	
17 June	The Eminem Show	Eminem	
24 June	The Eminem Show	Eminem	
1 July	The Eminem Show	Eminem	
8 July	The Eminem Show	Eminem	
15 July	The Eminem Show	Eminem	
22 July	Nellyville	Nelly	
29 July	The Eminem Show	Eminem	
5 August	The Eminem Show	Eminem	
12 August	The Eminem Show	Eminem	
19 August	The Eminem Show	Eminem	
26 August	The Eminem Show	Eminem	
2 September	The Eminem Show	Eminem	
9 September	The Eminem Show	Eminem	
16 September	The Eminem Show	Eminem	
23 September	The Eminem Show	Eminem	
30 September	The Eminem Show	Eminem	
7 October	The Eminem Show	Eminem	
14 October	Nellyville	Nelly	
21 October	Nellyville	Nelly	
28 October	Nellyville	Nelly	
4 November	8 Mile	Various Artists	
11 November	8 Mile	Various Artists	
18 November	8 Mile	Various Artists	
25 November	8 Mile	Various Artists	
2 December	8 Mile	Various Artists	
9 December	8 Mile	Various Artists	
16 December	8 Mile	Various Artists	
23 December	8 Mile	Various Artists	
30 December	8 Mile	Various Artists	

== See also ==
- 2002 in music
- List of number-one albums of 2002 (Australia)
