= Scorchio (instrumental) =

2000 single by Sasha and Darren Emerson

Single by Sasha and Darren Emerson
- Released: 18 September 2000
- Length: 9:36
- Label: Excession; Deconstruction; BMG
- Songwriters: Alexander Coe; Darren Emerson; Charlie May
- Producers: Coe; Emerson; May

Sasha singles chronology
"Be as One" (1996)	"Scorchio" (2000)	"Wavy Gravy" (2002)

Darren Emerson singles chronology
"Scorchio" (2000)	"H2O" (2002)

"Scorchio" is an instrumental by Welsh DJ Sasha and English musician Darren Emerson, credited mononymously as Emerson. It was released on 18 September 2000 by Sasha's vanity label at that time, Excession, through Deconstruction Records. The song peaked at number 23 on the UK Singles Chart in 2000, and reached number 1 on the UK Dance Chart. The song also charted in the Netherlands, and has been included on numerous compilations.

== Background and composition ==
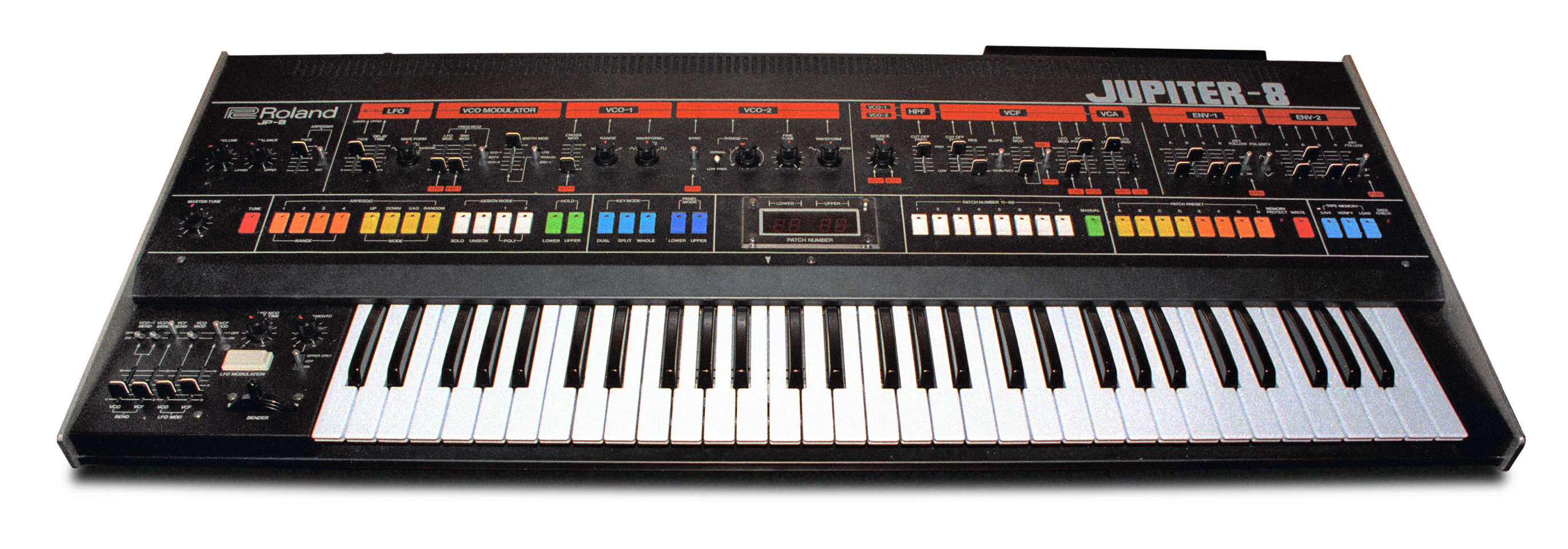
The Roland Jupiter-8 was used in the main riff

The collaboration had started after Sasha and Emerson met at a show in Uruguay that they had both been performing at, shortly following Emerson's departure from electronic music group Underworld. The song was co-written by Sasha, Emerson and Spooky member Charlie May, the latter performed song's main riff, on a Roland Jupiter-8 synthesiser.

The instrumental was named after a recurring sketch in the BBC comedy sketch show The Fast Show.

The song was written with a tempo of 135 beats per minute in the key of F minor. On the topic of the song's composition, Sasha stated that "[it] just came together so effortlessly, [...] and it really captured a moment".

== Reception ==
In the liner notes of the Kiss mix album Kiss House Nation 2001, Mixmag music editor Matthew Kershaw named "Scorchio" among 2000's "uncategorisable" club tracks, highlighting how it "managed to have the most outrageously sunny, Ibiza-fied main riff but also a dark, progressive edge."

== Formats and track listings ==
CD
No.	Title	Length
1.	"Scorchio" (Edit)	3:39
2.	"Scorchio" (Full Length Version)	9:36
3.	"Scorchio" (Emerson's Late Nite Dub)	6:26

Vinyl
No.	Title	Length
1.	"Scorchio" (Full Length Version)	9:43
2.	"Scorchio" (Emerson's Late Night Dub)	9:27

== Charts ==
Chart (2000)	Peak position
UK Singles (Official Charts Company)	23
UK Dance Singles (Official Charts Company)	1
Ireland (IRMA)	26
Netherlands (MegaCharts)	88

== See also ==
- List of UK Dance Singles Chart number ones of 2000
