= Debelah =

Studio album by Debelah Morgan
- Released: June 14, 1994
- Recorded: 1993
- Genre: R&B, new jack swing
- Label: Atlantic
- Producer: Keith Shocklee; Troy Taylor; Chris Stokes; Charles Farrar; Kip Collins

Debelah Morgan chronology
Debelah (1994)	It's Not Over (1998)

Professional ratings
Review scores
Source	Rating
AllMusic	3/5 stars

Debelah is the first album by American singer Debelah Morgan. It was released in the United States by Atlantic Records on June 14, 1994.

Atlantic Records released the album in the United States and Japan. It includes two singles: "Take It Easy" and a remake of the Deniece Williams song "Free". Other highlights on the album include Morgan and R&B singer Kenny Harper's remake of Rick James and Teena Marie's 1981 duet "Fire and Desire", and a duet with music producer Troy Taylor.

== Track listing ==
Dance with Me track listing
No.	Title	Writer(s)	Producer(s)	Length
1.	"Free"	Susaye Greene, Nathan Watts, J. Williams	Keith Shocklee	5:21
2.	"Don't Ask Me Why"	Sherree Ford-Payne, Robert Jerald	Robert Jerald	4:20
3.	"Mind Trippin'"	Harrell, Chris Stokes	Chris Stokes	4:36
4.	"Swingin' Solo"	Angela Stone	Angela Stone, Grandmaster Flash	4:23
5.	"Win You Over" (duet with Troy Taylor)	Troy Taylor	The Characters	4:56
6.	"We Had a Good Thing Goin'"	Angela Stone, Grandmaster Flash	Angela Stone, Grandmaster Flash	4:14
7.	"Floating"	Ingram, James Mitchell, Troy Taylor	The Characters	4:08
8.	"Take It Easy"	Alvaughn Jackson, Leonard Sinclair	Alvaughn Jackson, Domino Flex, Voe & Pop	4:55
9.	"Passion"	Alvaughn Jackson, Leonard Sinclair	Alvaughn Jackson, Domino Flex	4:46
10.	"You Are the Joy"	Steve Keitt	Steve Keitt	3:43
11.	"Fire and Desire" (duet with Kenny Harper)	Rick James	LeMel Humes	5:39
