= It's Not Over (Debelah Morgan album) =

Studio album by Debelah Morgan
- Released: September 15, 1998
- Genre: Pop, R&B
- Label: Motown, PolyGram, VAZ
- Producer: Bruce Carbone, Vassal Benford, George Jackson

Debelah Morgan chronology
Debelah (1994)	It's Not Over (1998)	Dance with Me (2000)

Singles from It's Not Over
- 1. "Yesterday" Released: July 27, 1998; 2. "I Love You" Released: August 19, 1998; 3. "Ain't No Mountain High Enough" Released: November 6, 1998

Professional ratings
Review scores
Source	Rating
AllMusic	3/5 stars

It's Not Over is the second album by American singer Debelah Morgan. It was released in Europe and Asia on VAZ/Motown on September 15, 1998. Its first single "Yesterday" was given a U.S. release giving Morgan a placing on the R&B charts. The album includes a duet with R&B singer Brian McKnight and a duet remake of the Motown classic "Ain't No Mountain High Enough" with R&B singer Herschel Boone. International single "I Love You" and remixes by Rodney Jerkins were the other highlights of the album. Two songs from the album were included on the soundtracks for Fame L.A. and Our Friend, Martin.

== Track listing ==
No.	Title	Writer(s)	Length
1.	"It’s Not Over"	Vassal Benford, Debelah Morgan, Giloh Morgan	4:30
2.	"Yesterday"	V. Benford, D. Morgan	4:44
3.	"Who Do You Love"	V. Benford	4:22
4.	"Stay"	V. Benford, D. Morgan, G. Morgan	4:22
5.	"I Love You"	V. Benford	3:38
6.	"Radio Skit"	D. Morgan, PJ Butta, G. Morgan	1:09
7.	"Ain't No Mountain"	Nickolas Ashford, Valerie Simpson	3:50
8.	"Fly Away"	Danny Sembello, Marti Sharron	4:17
9.	"Our Sweet Love"	V. Benford, D. Morgan, Herschell Boone	4:43
10.	"Whatever"	V. Benford	3:45
11.	"Still in Love"	V. Benford, Kathy Wakefield	4:08
12.	"No One Compares"	V. Benford, D. Morgan	4:41
13.	"Here Waiting"	V. Benford	4:00
14.	"Don’t Hurry Back"	D. Morgan, G. Morgan	5:12
15.	"Tonight"	D. Morgan, G. Morgan	4:05
