= Airheadz =

UK trance music band

- Also known as: Apex, Ultrasonus, Stargazers
- Origin: United Kingdom
- Genres: Trance
- Years active: 2000–2003
- Labels: AM:PM; Dos Or Die Recordings; G2; Insolent Tracks; Bang On!
- Past members: Leigh Guest; Andrew Peach

Airheadz was a UK trance production duo based in London, comprising Leigh Guest and Andrew Peach. They were later joined by Caroline De Batselier who acted as vocalist and live performer.

== History ==
Although the two members of the group had worked together before under different aliases, the name “Airheadz” was first used in 2000 on the 12-inch white-label trance track “In the Air” and was subsequently used for a number of trance productions and remixes between 2000 and 2003.

Airheadz are best known for the trance hit single "Stanley (Here I Am)" which first came into existence as a bootleg record entitled "Stanley – Stanley's in a Trance Mix" due to it containing a vocal sample from Eminem's "Stan", and which itself was a sample taken from Dido's "Thank You". The “Stanley’s in a Trance Mix” quickly gained popularity on the UK and European club scenes and national radio circuit from late 2000 to early 2001, but due to the inability to obtain legal clearance for the use of Dido's vocal segment, the track ultimately did not receive an official release.

In spring 2001, the track was re-released under AM PM Records as "Stanley – Here I Am" with the Dido sample having been removed and replaced with an entirely new vocal segment (Caroline De Batselier), modifying the feel of the track quite profoundly. In April 2001, the official (modified) version reached a peak position of No. 36 on the UK Singles Chart and is currently listed in the Top 100 trance anthems of all time.

== Discography ==
=== Singles ===
- 2000: "In the Air"
- 2001: "Stanley (Stanley's in a Trance Mix)"
- 2001: "Stanley (Here I Am)" – UK No. 36

=== Remixes ===
- 2000: Charlie – "Burn and Shiver"
- 2000: Apex – "Virtuoso" (Airheadz Mix)
- 2001: Stargazers – "Is There Anybody Out There?" (Airheadz Mix)
- 2001: Move – "Come Together"
- 2003: Sur Le Mer featuring Sandy – "HI-NRG"
- 2003: Jamie West – "Venus"
- 2007: Farley Jackmaster Funk – "Love Can't Turn Around"
