= Starlight (The Supermen Lovers song) =

2001 single by the Supermen Lovers

Single by the Supermen Lovers featuring Mani Hoffman

from the album The Player
- Released: 17 March 2001
- Length: 6:00 (original version); 3:50 (radio and video version)
- Label: Vogue; BMG France; Lafessé
- Composer: Guillaume Atlan
- Lyricists: Guillaume Atlan; Mani Hoffman
- Producer: Guillaume Atlan

The Supermen Lovers singles chronology
"Starlight" (2001)	"Hard Stuff (Get Your Ticket for a Ride)" (2002)

Music video
- "Starlight" on YouTube

"Starlight" is a song by French house musician the Supermen Lovers (also known as Guillaume Atlan), featuring Mani Hoffman on lead vocals. The female vocals on the song were performed by Israeli singer-songwriter Nili. The song contains a sample of "The Rock" (1978) by disco assemblage East Coast.

"Starlight" was released as Atlan's debut single and as the first single from his debut album, The Player, on 17 March 2001. It became a chart hit, peaking at number two in both France and the United Kingdom and entering the top 10 in New Zealand, Norway, and Wallonia. In 2025, a remix featuring OneRepublic was released under the title "Starlight (The Fame)".

== Music video ==
The music video tells the story of the misadventures of a young man trying to make it in the music industry. Following a chance meeting with a mouse, he finds short-lived success, only to be fired by his manager. The video ends with alien visitors, who picked up a broadcast of the young man's music, trying to pick him up, but the young man is too big to fit in their spaceship. They take the mouse away to a life of luxury, leaving the man alone and destitute. The video was produced by brothers David and Laurent Nicolas at Passion Pictures.

== Track listings ==
French and Australian CD single

1. "Starlight" (radio edit) – 3:50
2. "Starlight" (original version) – 6:00
3. "Starlight" (dub version) – 8:46
4. "Starlight" (instrumental) – 6:00

French remixes CD single

1. "Starlight" (Derrick Carter Remix—BHQ Rub) – 6:12
2. "Starlight" (BRS Remix) – 6:50
3. "Starlight" (Derrick Carter Remix—jazz radio) – 3:24
4. "Starlight" (Agent Sumo Remix) – 7:27

European CD single

1. "Starlight" (radio edit) – 3:50
2. "Starlight" (original version) – 6:00

UK CD single

1. "Starlight" (radio edit) – 3:48
2. "Starlight" (Agent Sumo Supermagic Mix) – 7:29
3. "Starlight" (BHQ Rub) – 6:18

UK 12-inch single

A1. "Starlight" (radio edit)
A2. "Starlight" (BHQ Rub)
B1. "Starlight" (Agent Sumo Supermagic Mix)

UK cassette single

1. "Starlight" (radio edit) – 3:48
2. "Starlight" (BHQ radio edit) – 3:26

== Credits and personnel ==
Credits are taken from the French CD single liner notes.

Studio

- Mastered at Translab (Paris, France)

Personnel

- Guillaume Atlan – music, lyrics, production
- Mani Hoffman – lyrics, vocals
- Nili – additional vocals
- Hervé Bordes – mixing, mastering
- Emmanuel Desmadril – mixing
- Adrien de Maublanc – cover artwork

== Charts ==
=== "Starlight" ===
==== Weekly charts ====
Weekly chart performance for "Starlight"
Chart (2001)	Peak position
Australia (ARIA)	12
Australian Club Chart (ARIA)	1
Australian Dance (ARIA)	1
Belgium (Ultratop 50 Flanders)	46
Belgium (Ultratop 50 Wallonia)	10
Europe (Eurochart Hot 100)	7
France (SNEP)	2
Germany (GfK)	87
Ireland (IRMA)	7
Ireland Dance (IRMA)	1
Italy (FIMI)	6
Netherlands (Dutch Top 40)	23
Netherlands (Single Top 100)	43
New Zealand (Recorded Music NZ)	4
Norway (VG-lista)	4
Scottish Singles Sales (Official Charts)	2
Switzerland (Schweizer Hitparade)	32
UK Singles (Official Charts)	2
UK Dance (Official Charts)	4
UK Indie (Official Charts)	40

==== Year-end charts ====
2001 year-end chart performance for "Starlight"
Chart (2001)	Position
Australia (ARIA)	67
Australian Club Chart (ARIA)	3
Australian Dance (ARIA)	5
Belgium (Ultratop 50 Wallonia)	46
Europe (Eurochart Hot 100)	40
France (SNEP)	17
Ireland (IRMA)	68
New Zealand (RIANZ)	33
UK Singles (OCC)	34

2002 year-end chart performance for "Starlight"
Chart (2002)	Position
UK Airplay (Music Week)	71

=== "Starlight (The Fame)" ===
==== Weekly charts ====
Weekly chart performance for "Starlight (The Fame)"
Chart (2025)	Peak position
Belgium (Ultratop 50 Wallonia)	41
CIS Airplay (TopHit)	159
Czech Republic Airplay (ČNS IFPI)	64
Israel International Airplay (Media Forest)	7
Latvia Airplay (LaIPA)	9
Russia Airplay (TopHit)	168

==== Monthly charts ====
Monthly chart performance for "Starlight (The Fame)"
Chart (2025)	Peak position
Latvia Airplay (TopHit)	13

==== Year-end charts ====
Year-end chart performance for "Starlight (The Fame)"
Chart (2025)	Position
Latvia Airplay (TopHit)	63

== Certifications and sales ==
Certifications and sales for "Starlight"
Region	Certification	Certified units/sales
Australia (ARIA)	Gold	50,000
France (SNEP)	Gold	420,000
New Zealand (RMNZ)	Platinum	30,000^{‡}
United Kingdom (BPI)	Platinum	600,000^{‡}
^{‡} Sales+streaming figures based on certification alone.

== Release history ==
Release dates and formats for "Starlight"
Region	Date	Format(s)	Label(s)	Ref.
France	17 March 2001	12-inch vinyl; CD	Vogue; BMG France; Lafessé	
Australia	16 July 2001	CD	Vogue; BMG France	
United Kingdom	3 September 2001	CD	Vogue; BMG France; Independiente	

== See also ==
- List of number-one dance singles of 2001 (Australia)
- List of number-one club tracks of 2001 (Australia)
