= Aquagen =

German electronic dance music duo

- Also known as: Sandbox Rockers
- Origin: Krefeld, Germany
- Genres: Eurodance, trance
- Years active: 1999–present
- Labels: Dos Or Die Recordings; Bonnier Music; Kontor Records
- Members: Gino Montesano; Olaf Dieckmann
- Website: aquagen.de

Aquagen is a German electronic dance music duo, consisting of Gino Montesano and Olaf Dieckmann. They initially achieved success with their single "Ihr Seid So Leise" ("You are so quiet"), which sold more than 250,000 copies in Germany.

== Discography ==
=== Studio albums ===
- Abgehfaktor (2000)
- Weekender (2002)
- Nightliner (2002)

=== Compilation albums ===
- So Far So Good (The Very Best Of) (2009)

=== Singles ===
- "Ihr Seid So Leise" (1999)
- "Party Alarm" (2000)
- "Phatt Bass" (2000) (vs. Warp Brothers) - UK #9
- "Tanz Für Mich" (2000) (feat. Ingo Appelt)
- "Lovemachine" (2000)
- "Hard to Say I'm Sorry" (2002) - UK #33
- "Everybody's Free" (2002) (feat. Rozalla)
- "Summer Is Calling" (2002)
- "Girl (Uhh Uhh Yeah Yeah)" (2004)
- "The Pipes Are Calling" (2006)
- "Blade" (2008) (Ali Payami vs. Aquagen & Warp Brothers)
- "Hard to Say I'm Sorry 2K9" (2009)
- "Ihr Seid So Leise! 2011 (scheisse, scheisse leise)" (2011)
- "Sirens" (2013) (feat. Romez & Damark)
