= The Supermen Lovers =

French electronic music producer (born 1975)

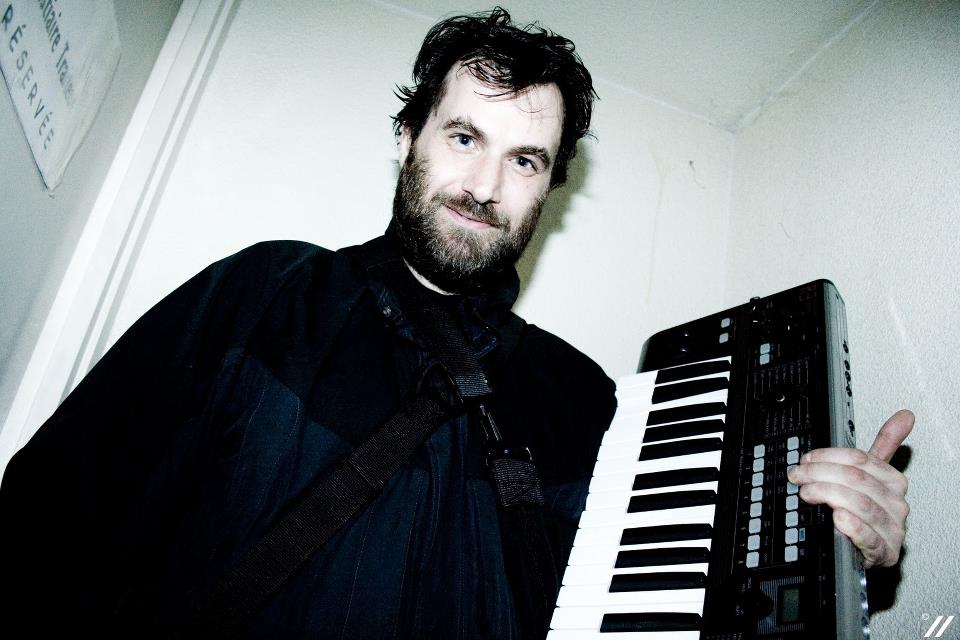
- Guillaume Atlan in 2014

Background information
- Also known as: Stan de Mareuil, Entschuldigung, roommates, Kill this Kant, School, M.O.T.O
- Born: Guillaume Atlan; 9 February 1975 (age 51); Paris, France
- Genres: French house, tech house, funky house
- Years active: 1998-present
- Labels: BMG, RCA Victor, Lafessé Records, Word Up Records, Indepediente, La tebwa, Da Box Publishing, Universal Music Publishing

The Supermen Lovers is the stage name of French electronic music producer Guillaume Atlan (French pronunciation: [ɡijom atlɑ̃]; born 9 February 1975, Paris). Following his 2001 hit single "Starlight", Atlan was nominated at the French contest Victoires de la Musique in 2002, and at the 2001 MTV Europe Music Awards for Best French Artist.

== Biography ==
Atlan was born in Paris. His mother was a social worker and his father was a doctor and the drummer of the music band Mose. At the age of 8, he started studying solfège piano at the Francis Poulenc conservatory. His training lasted eight years. He released his first electronic album on UK label Cyclo under the name of "School", a duet which he took up with Stéphane Bejean-Lebenson. The title track, "Ain't no Love" was remixed by Larry Heard in 1999.

In 1999, Atlan opened his first label, Lafessé Records, starting to produce house music under the name of Stan de Mareuil. In 2000, he started his "The Supermen Lovers" project in tribute to the Johnny Guitar Watson track "Superman Lover". After the release of "Marathon Man," released on his own label, Atlan composed Starlight. Mani Hoffman joined him on this project, singing and co-writing its lyrics with Atlan. Backing vocals were provided by Onili. The track contains a sample of "East Coast – The Rock" composed by Charlie Wallert.

Atlan released his first album, The Player on BMG in 2001. The single "Starlight" charted at number 2 in France and in the U.K. and also charted highly in Belgium, Australia, Germany, Spain, and Italy. After several EPs, released between 2001 and 2004, his second album Boys in the Wood was released at the end of 2004.

In 2008, Atlan met Rick Bailey of the band Delegation. Bailey asked Atlan to produce a new version of the hit track "You & I". Following the meeting, Atlan decided to work on a new album, in collaboration with 1980s funk artists including Bailey, and Norma Jean Wright from Chic. In collaboration with La Tebwa Records, his third album, Between the Ages was launched in November 2011. There was some positive critical reaction to the tracks "Say No More", "C'est Bon" and "Take a Chance". The tracks were remixed by artists such as Todd Edwards, Chloe and Aka Aka.

In January 2011, Atlan changed the musical direction of "The Supermen Lovers", mixing synthesizers, guitars, sequencers and a brass ensemble. He was also asked to remix tracks by Jupiter, Andy, Spiller and S'Express. In 2013, he created a new label, Word Up Records, on which he released Absolute Disco EP (2016), Walking on the Moon EP (2017), and Clock Sucker EP (2018).

Following round trips between Paris and Kyiv in 2018 and 2019, Guillaume decided to compose and produce a new album "Body Double". It was released on May 28 2022, on his label Word Up Records.

== Discography ==
=== Studio albums ===
- The Player (2002)
- Boys in the Wood (2004)
- Between the Ages (2011)
- Alterations (2014)
- Body Double (2022)

=== EPs ===
- Underground Disco EP (2001)
- Ultimate Disco EP (2001)
- Fantasia Disco EP (2003)
- Noctus Delectatum EP (2003)
- Material Disco EP (2004)
- Foundation Disco EP (2011)
- Fantasma Disco EP (2012)
- Absolute Disco EP (2016)
- Walking on the Moon EP (2017)
- Clock Sucker EP (2018)
- Requiem for a Body Double. (2021
- ”Coco Bingo” (2026)

=== Singles ===
- "Starlight" (featuring Mani Hoffman) (2001)
- "Diamonds for Her" (2002)
- "Hard Stuff (Get Your Ticket for a Ride)" (2002)
- "Born to Love You" (2004)
- "Bus Stop" (2005)
- "Under Pressure" (2005)
- "Take a Chance" (2010)
- "C'est Bon" (2011)
- "We Got That Booty" (2012)
- "Moments" (2013)
- "It's OK!" (2016)
- "Walking on the Moon" (2017)
- "Clock Sucker" (2018)
- "Eyes on You" featuring Scarlett Quinn (2018)
- "Pigeon" (2020)
- "My Only" (2022)
- "Starlight (The Fame)" (featuring OneRepublic) (2025)

=== Soundtracks ===
- Poltergay (2006) (as Moto & The Supermen Lovers)

=== Remixes ===
- Donny Hathaway – The Ghetto (The Supermen Lovers Remix)
- Jupiter – One O six (The Supermen Lovers Classic Remix)
- Jupiter – One O Six (The Supermen Lovers Basic Remix)
- Scuola Furano – Danceteria (The Supermen Lovers Remix)
- Scuola Furano – Danceteria (The Supermen Lovers Dub)
- Jarco Weiss & Le Miracle – Cosmos Anatomique (The Supermen Lovers Classic Remix)
- Jarco Weiss & Le Miracle – Cosmos Anatomique (The Supermen Lovers Basic Remix)
- A.N.D.Y & Vicente – El Barrio (The Supermen Lovers Remix)
- Count Jackula – Breakfast (The Supermen Lovers Remix)
- Spiller – URASTAR (The Supermen Lovers Remix)
- Natty Fensie – Gonna find you (The Supermen Lovers remix)
- Situation – Robot (The Supermen Lovers)
- Lo Stato Sociale – Pop (The Supermen Lovers Classic Remix)
- Lo Stato Sociale – Pop (The Supermen Lovers Basic Remix)
- Kimo & Fido – Victory (The Supermen Lovers Remix)
- New Order – 60 miles/hour (The Supermen Lovers Remix)
- Master H – C'est la vie (The Supermen Lovers Remix)
