= List of number-one albums of 2001 (Australia) =

ARIA Charts number-one albums of 2001 < 2000 2002 >

Other Australian number-one charts of 2001
- singles
- dance singles

Top Australian singles and albums of 2001
- Triple J Hottest 100
- top 25 singles
- top 25 albums

These are the Australian number-one albums of 2001, per the ARIA Charts.

Key
The yellow background indicates the #1 album on ARIA's End of Year Albums Chart of 2001.

Issue date	Album	Artist	Weeks at number one (total)
1 January	1	The Beatles	9 weeks
8 January	1	The Beatles	9 weeks
15 January	1	The Beatles	9 weeks
22 January	Coyote Ugly	Soundtrack	6 weeks
29 January	Coyote Ugly	Soundtrack	6 weeks
5 February	Coyote Ugly	Soundtrack	6 weeks
12 February	Coyote Ugly	Soundtrack	6 weeks
19 February	Coyote Ugly	Soundtrack	6 weeks
26 February	Coyote Ugly	Soundtrack	6 weeks
5 March	The Marshall Mathers LP	Eminem	1 week
12 March	No Angel	Dido	8 weeks
19 March	No Angel	Dido	8 weeks
26 March	No Angel	Dido	8 weeks
2 April	No Angel	Dido	8 weeks
9 April	No Angel	Dido	8 weeks
16 April	No Angel	Dido	8 weeks
23 April	No Angel	Dido	8 weeks
30 April	No Angel	Dido	8 weeks
7 May	The Disney Album	Michael Crawford	2 weeks
14 May	The Disney Album	Michael Crawford	2 weeks
21 May	Lateralus	Tool	1 week
28 May	Moulin Rouge!	Soundtrack	11 weeks
4 June	Moulin Rouge!	Soundtrack	11 weeks
11 June	Moulin Rouge!	Soundtrack	11 weeks
18 June	Moulin Rouge!	Soundtrack	11 weeks
25 June	Moulin Rouge!	Soundtrack	11 weeks
2 July	Moulin Rouge!	Soundtrack	11 weeks
9 July	Moulin Rouge!	Soundtrack	11 weeks
16 July	Moulin Rouge!	Soundtrack	11 weeks
23 July	Moulin Rouge!	Soundtrack	11 weeks
30 July	Moulin Rouge!	Soundtrack	11 weeks
6 August	Moulin Rouge!	Soundtrack	11 weeks
13 August	Bridget Jones's Diary	Soundtrack	5 weeks
20 August	Bridget Jones's Diary	Soundtrack	5 weeks
27 August	Bridget Jones's Diary	Soundtrack	5 weeks
3 September	Bridget Jones's Diary	Soundtrack	5 weeks
10 September	A Funk Odyssey	Jamiroquai	6 weeks
17 September	Bridget Jones's Diary	Soundtrack	5 weeks
24 September	V	Live	2 weeks
1 October	V	Live	2 weeks
8 October	Beautiful Garbage	Garbage	1 week
15 October	Fever	Kylie Minogue	5 weeks
22 October	Fever	Kylie Minogue	5 weeks
29 October	Fever	Kylie Minogue	5 weeks
5 November	Invincible	Michael Jackson	1 week
12 November	Fever	Kylie Minogue	5 weeks
19 November	Fever	Kylie Minogue	5 weeks
26 November	Bob the Builder: The Album	Bob the Builder	2 weeks
3 December	Bob the Builder: The Album	Bob the Builder	2 weeks
10 December	The Final Dig?	The Twelfth Man	5 weeks
17 December	The Final Dig?	The Twelfth Man	5 weeks
24 December	The Final Dig?	The Twelfth Man	5 weeks
31 December	The Final Dig?	The Twelfth Man	5 weeks

== See also ==
- 2001 in music
- List of number-one singles in Australia in 2001

== Notes ==
- Number of number one albums: 15
- Longest run at number one (during 2001): Moulin Rouge! soundtrack (11 weeks)
