= List of top 25 albums for 2001 in Australia =

Top 25 albums of 2001 < 2000 2002 >

Other Australian top charts for 2001
- top 25 singles
- Triple J Hottest 100

Australian number-one charts of 2001
- albums
- singles
- dance singles

The following lists the top 25 albums of 2001 in Australia from the Australian Recording Industry Association (ARIA) End of Year Albums Chart.

#	Title	Artist	Highest pos. reached	Weeks at No. 1
1.	Moulin Rouge!	Soundtrack	1	11 (Note: Moulin Rouge debuted at #4 in May, 2001 and then spent eleven weeks in the #1 position spending a further fifteen week in the charts. It re-entered the charts in December 2001 for another fifteen weeks and re-entering again in April, 2002 remaining until May, 2002 (a further ten weeks).)
2.	No Angel	Dido	1	8
3.	Human Clay	Creed	2	
4.	Born to Do It	Craig David	2	
5.	Fever	Kylie Minogue	1	5 (Note: Fever debuted at #1 in October, 2001 and spent a total of 74 weeks in the charts, remaining until March, 2003.)
6.	Hot Shot	Shaggy	2	
7.	Odyssey Number Five	Powderfinger	1	3 (Note: Odyssey Number Five debuted at #1 in September, 2000 and remained in the charts until March, 2002)
8.	Coyote Ugly	Soundtrack	1	6
9.	Chocolate Starfish and the Hot Dog Flavored Water	Limp Bizkit	1	1
10.	All That You Can't Leave Behind	U2	1	2
11.	Bridget Jones's Diary: Music from the Motion Picture	Soundtrack	1	5
12.	The Marshall Mathers LP	Eminem	1	1 (Note: The Marshall Mathers LP entered the charts in June 2000 and did not reach #1 until March, 2001 remaining in the charts until October, 2001)
13.	Parachutes	Coldplay	2	
14.	One	The Beatles	1	9
15.	Hybrid Theory	Linkin Park	2	
16.	Whoa, Nelly!	Nelly Furtado	4	
17.	Light Years	Kylie Minogue	1	1
18.	Best of The Corrs	The Corrs	2	
19.	Ronan	Ronan Keating	5	
20.	Survivor	Destiny's Child	4	
21.	J. Lo	Jennifer Lopez	2	
22.	Drops of Jupiter	Train	3	
23.	Music	Madonna	2	
24.	Greatest Hits	Lenny Kravitz	14	
25.	The Album	Bob the Builder	1	2

Peak chart positions from 2001 are from the ARIA Charts, overall position on the End of Year Chart is calculated by ARIA based on the number of weeks and position that the records reach within the Top 50 albums for each week during 2001.
