= Independent Women Part I =

2000 single by Destiny's Child

Single by Destiny's Child

from the album Charlie's Angels
- Released: August 29, 2000
- Studio: SugarHill (Houston, Texas)
- Genre: R&B
- Length: 3:37
- Label: Columbia
- Songwriters: Beyoncé Knowles; Samuel Barnes; Cory Rooney; Jean-Claude Olivier
- Producers: Beyoncé Knowles; Poke and Tone; Cory Rooney

Destiny's Child singles chronology
"Jumpin' Jumpin'" (2000)	"Independent Women Part I" (2000)	"Survivor" (2001)

Charlie's Angels singles chronology
"Independent Women Part I" (2000)	"Angel's Eye" (2000)

Music video
- "Independent Women Part I" on YouTube

"Independent Women Part I" is a song recorded by American girl group Destiny's Child for the soundtrack to the film adaptation of the 1970s television series Charlie's Angels. It was written and produced by the production duo Poke & Tone, consisting of Samuel Barnes and Jean-Claude Olivier, along with Cory Rooney and group member Beyoncé Knowles. The song was later included on the group's third studio album, Survivor (2001). "Independent Women" was Destiny's Child's first single to feature vocals from group member Michelle Williams and their only single to feature Farrah Franklin, who had departed the group prior to the single's release.

Released as the soundtrack's lead single in August 2000, the song spent 11 consecutive weeks at number one on the US Billboard Hot 100 chart from November 2000 to February 2001. It was named the 18th-most successful song of the 2000s on the Billboard Hot 100 Songs of the Decade. The song appeared in the 2000–2001 edition of the Guinness Book of World Records as the longest-running number-one song by a female group. Debuting at number one on the UK Singles Chart, it became the 25th-best-selling single of 2000 in the country.

The song received generally positive retrospective reviews for its themes of feminism and female empowerment. Billboard ranked the song at number 77 on its list of the "100 Greatest Girl Group Songs of All Time". The song was also nominated for Best Song Written for a Motion Picture, Television or Other Visual Media at the 2001 Grammy Awards.

== Background ==
"Independent Women Part I" was written and produced by the production duo Poke & Tone, consisting of Samuel Barnes and Jean-Claude Olivier, along with Cory Rooney and group member Beyoncé Knowles. The song originated after Knowles had an argument with her then-boyfriend, which inspired her to reflect on her independence. As she later recalled, she thought, "I don’t need a man, I'm independent," and subsequently went into the studio alone to record an early version of the track promoting both financial and emotional self-sufficiency. Production duo Keybeats, consisting of Eric Seats and Rapture Stewart, along with David Donaldson, assembled the initial version, incorporating a sample from "Peabody's Improbable History" by Frank Comstock. This original rendition later appeared on Destiny's Child's 2001 album Survivor as "Independent Women Part II."

Knowles's father and then-manager, Mathew Knowles, submitted the track to the Charlie's Angels soundtrack without her prior knowledge. Because Destiny's Child's label, Columbia Records, was distributing the soundtrack, company executives considered the song thematically well suited to the film's portrayal of three strong, independent women. However, they felt that the original version lacked sufficient commercial appeal and therefore commissioned Barnes and Olivier to remix the track and revise the lyrics to better align with the film. Rather than producing a simple remix, the duo substantially reworked the composition. Amid reported concerns from the label regarding Knowles's songwriting abilities, Barnes and Olivier were initially instructed to exclude her from subsequent writing sessions. Contrary to those directions, however, they forwarded the newly produced version to Knowles so she could compose revised lyrics. Although some executives questioned the track's linear structure, this reworked version was ultimately released first and consequently titled "Independent Women Part I."

== Composition ==
According to sheet music published at Musicnotes.com, the song is written in F-sharp minor with a tempo of 96 beats per minute. In an interview with Billboard, Beyoncé explained the meaning of the song and its inspiration:

"I remember being in Japan when Destiny's Child put out 'Independent Women,' and women there were saying how proud they were to have their own jobs, their own independent thinking, their own goals. It made me feel so good, and I realized that one of my responsibilities was to inspire women in a deeper way."

== Critical reception ==
NME wrote that even if "the girls have got it a little wrong – measuring their independence by the glint of their jewellery", it "beats as confident as this smack you upside your head, and when the track has such immediate, club-bound freshness". Craig Seymour of Entertainment Weekly wrote that "an anthem for female autonomy" is "preposterous" as a soundtrack to a film about "three babes managed by an ol’ codger", ultimately finding the song "a misguided mess". Billboard noted that the single's release strategy appeared influenced by Janet Jackson's "Doesn't Really Matter", observing that the group "began planting the seeds for the upcoming release" in a similar vein. It was also ranked at number 85 on a list of Britain's 100 favorite songs published in May 2002.

In 2014, HuffPost ranked "Independent Women Part I" as the group's second-best song. Oprah Daily featured the track on its list of "50 Songs to Inspire and Empower the Women in Your Life". In including the song on "The Best Feminist Anthems of All Time", Harper's Bazaar wrote, "The girl group pays tribute to the woman who is self-sufficient, self-motivated, and self-made." Parade placed the song at number 19 on its list of "40 Songs That Scream Female Empowerment", noting that "Destiny's Child created one of the best girl power anthems ever".

The song was nominated for Best Song Written for a Motion Picture, Television or Other Visual Media at the 43rd Annual Grammy Awards. It was also nominated for Worst Song at the 2000 Stinkers Bad Movie Awards.

== Commercial performance ==
"Independent Women Part I" was a major commercial success in the United States, reaching number one on the Billboard Hot 100. The single retained the top spot the following week, buoyed by the strong box-office performance of Charlie's Angels and the heavy rotation the track received. In total, the single spent 11 consecutive weeks atop the Billboard Hot 100. During its 10th week in the lead position, industry commentators anticipated that the single would drop due to heavy retail competition; however, it remained at number one driven by strong sales of the maxi-CD released in December 2000. The song appeared in the 2000–2001 edition of the Guinness Book of World Records as the longest-running number-one song by a female group. "Independent Women Part I" also topped the Hot R&B/Hip-Hop Singles & Tracks chart for three weeks, becoming Destiny's Child's fourth number-one single on that chart.

In the United Kingdom, "Independent Women Part I" debuted at number one on the UK Singles Chart for the week ending December 2, 2000. The single spent one week at the summit and remained in the top 40 for 11 weeks before exiting on February 17, 2001. It was the 25th-best-selling single of 2000 in the UK and was certified platinum by the British Phonographic Industry (BPI). In 2019, the Official Charts Company listed the song at number 35 on its countdown of the "top 100 girl band singles of the last 25 years". The single also reached number one in New Zealand. Elsewhere, it reached the top five in Belgium (Flanders and Wallonia), Denmark, Finland, Hungary, the Netherlands, Spain, and Switzerland; the top 10 in Germany, Greece, Poland, and Sweden; the top 20 in France and Italy; and the top 30 in Austria.

== Music video ==
The music video was directed by Francis Lawrence and filmed in Los Angeles from August 27 to September 1, 2000. In the video, Destiny's Child takes part in a futuristic Charlie's Angels boot camp and sits in a classroom viewing footage of Charlie's Angels. The members complete various training challenges: agility (dancing), altitude (skydiving), combat (martial arts fighting), and speed (motorcycle riding). At the end, the group is greeted by the mysterious Charlie Townsend (voiced by John Forsythe). Interspersed throughout are scenes of the group performing on a large disco dance floor. Visual effects were handled in post-production by digital effects studio Pixel Envy.

The music video premiered on MTV's Making the Video series on September 18, 2000. It is featured on the DualDisc edition of the group's 2005 compilation album #1's and as a bonus feature on the DVD release of Charlie's Angels.

== Track listings ==
US and Canadian maxi-CD single (44K 79493)

1. "Independent Women" (Part I—album version) – 3:41
2. "Independent Women" (Victor Calderone drum dub mix) – 5:30
3. "Independent Women" (Victor Calderone club mix) – 9:36
4. "Independent Women" (Maurice's Independent Man remix) – 7:30
5. "8 Days of Christmas" – 3:29

US 12-inch single (44 79493)

A1. "Independent Women Part I" (Maurice's Independent Man remix) – 7:30
A2. "Independent Women Part I" (album version) – 3:41
A3. "Independent Women Part I" (instrumental) – 3:41
B1. "Independent Women Part I" (Victor Calderone club mix) – 9:36
B2. "Independent Women Part I" (Victor Calderone drum dub mix) – 5:30

UK CD1 (670593 2)

1. "Independent Women Part I" (album version) – 3:41
2. "Independent Women Part I" (Victor Calderone radio mix) – 4:24
3. "Independent Women Part I" (Maurice's radio mix) – 3:54

UK CD2 (670593 5)

1. "Independent Women Part II" – 3:45
2. "Say My Name" (Timbaland remix) – 5:01
3. "So Good" – 3:14

UK cassette single (670593 4)

1. "Independent Women Part I" (album version) – 3:41
2. "Independent Women Part II" – 3:45

European CD1 (COL 669822 1)

1. "Independent Women Part I" (album version) – 3:41
2. "Independent Women Part I" (Victor Calderone radio mix) – 4:24

European CD2 (COL 669822 2)

1. "Independent Women Part I" (album version) – 3:41
2. "Independent Women Part I" (Joe Smooth 200 Proof 2 Step mix) – 4:17
3. "Independent Women Part I" (Maurice's radio mix) – 3:54
4. "Independent Women Part I" (Victor Calderone club mix) – 9:36

Australian and New Zealand CD single (669804 2)

1. "Independent Women Part I" (album version)
2. "Independent Women Part I" (Victor Calderone radio mix)
3. "Independent Women Part I" (Maurice's radio mix)
4. "Independent Women Part I" (Victor Calderone club mix)

== Credits and personnel ==
Credits are adapted from the liner notes of Survivor.

- Samuel Barnes – writing, production
- Tom Coyne – mastering
- Troy Gonzalez – recording
- Cory Rooney – writing, production
- Beyoncé Knowles – co-production, vocals, writing
- Jean-Claude Olivier – writing, production
- Kelly Rowland – vocals
- Manelich Sotolongo – recording
- Rich Travali – mixing
- Michelle Williams – vocals
- Farrah Franklin – vocals

== Charts ==
=== Weekly charts ===
Chart (2000–2001)	Peak position
Australia (ARIA)	3
Australian Dance (ARIA)	1
Australian Urban (ARIA)	1
Austria (Ö3 Austria Top 40)	22
Belgium (Ultratop 50 Flanders)	3
Belgium (Ultratop 50 Wallonia)	4
Canada (Nielsen SoundScan)	3
Canada CHR (Nielsen BDS)	1
Croatia International (HRT) (Note: Only a partial archive of the Croatian chart is available so it is possible that the single had a higher peak.)	7
Denmark (Tracklisten)	3
Europe (Eurochart Hot 100)	1
Finland (Suomen virallinen lista)	5
France (SNEP)	19
Germany (GfK)	10
Greece (IFPI)	6
Hungary (MAHASZ)	5
Iceland (Íslenski Listinn Topp 40)	2
Ireland (IRMA)	2
Italy (FIMI)	17
Netherlands (Dutch Top 40)	2
Netherlands (Single Top 100)	2
New Zealand (Recorded Music NZ)	1
Norway (VG-lista)	2
Poland (Polish Airplay Chart)	10
Scottish Singles Sales (Official Charts)	3
Spain (Promusicae)	5
Sweden (Sverigetopplistan)	6
Switzerland (Schweizer Hitparade)	2
UK Singles (Official Charts)	1
UK Airplay (Music Week)	2
UK Hip Hop/R&B (Official Charts)	1
US Billboard Hot 100	1
US Dance Club Songs (Billboard)	1
US Dance Singles Sales (Billboard)	1
US Hot R&B/Hip-Hop Songs (Billboard)	1
US Pop Airplay (Billboard)	1
US Rhythmic Airplay (Billboard)	1

=== Year-end charts ===
Chart (2000)	Position
Australia (ARIA)	58
Belgium (Ultratop 50 Wallonia)	79
Denmark (IFPI)	43
France (SNEP)	99
Ireland (IRMA)	25
Netherlands (Dutch Top 40)	69
Netherlands (Single Top 100)	34
Sweden (Hitlistan)	59
UK Singles (OCC)	25
UK Urban (Music Week)	18
US Billboard Hot 100	97
US Hot R&B/Hip-Hop Singles & Tracks (Billboard)	81
US Hot Soundtrack Singles (Billboard)	8
US Rhythmic Top 40 (Billboard)	40

Chart (2001)	Position
Australia (ARIA)	57
Australian Dance (ARIA)	9
Belgium (Ultratop 50 Wallonia)	87
Brazil (Crowley)	19
Canada (Nielsen SoundScan)	44
Canada (Nielsen SoundScan) Australian release	188
Canada (Nielsen SoundScan) Release with both parts	178
Europe (Eurochart Hot 100)	22
Ireland (IRMA)	89
Netherlands (Dutch Top 40)	91
Netherlands (Single Top 100)	90
Switzerland (Schweizer Hitparade)	30
UK Singles (OCC)	184
UK Airplay (Music Week)	34
US Billboard Hot 100	10
US Hot R&B/Hip-Hop Singles & Tracks (Billboard)	43
US Mainstream Top 40 (Billboard)	14
US Maxi-Singles Sales (Billboard)	1
US Rhythmic Top 40 (Billboard)	20

=== Decade-end charts ===
Chart (2000–2009)	Position
Netherlands (Single Top 100)	93
US Billboard Hot 100	18

=== All-time charts ===
Chart (2018)	Position
US Billboard Hot 100	131

== Certifications ==
Region	Certification	Certified units/sales
Australia (ARIA)	2× Platinum	140,000^{^}
Belgium (BRMA)	Gold	25,000^{*}
Denmark (IFPI Danmark)	Gold	4,000^{^}
France (SNEP)	Gold	250,000^{*}
Germany (BVMI)	Gold	250,000^{‡}
Netherlands (NVPI)	Gold	40,000^{^}
New Zealand (RMNZ)	Platinum	30,000^{‡}
Sweden (GLF)	Platinum	30,000^{^}
Switzerland (IFPI Switzerland)	Gold	25,000^{^}
United Kingdom (BPI)	Platinum	600,000^{‡}
United States (RIAA)	Platinum	1,000,000^{‡}
^{*} Sales figures based on certification alone.^{^} Shipments figures based on certification alone.^{‡} Sales+streaming figures based on certification alone.

== Release history ==
Release dates and formats for "Independent Women Part I"
Region	Date	Format(s)	Label(s)	Ref.
United States	August 29, 2000	Rhythmic contemporary radio; urban contemporary radio	Columbia	
United States	September 19, 2000	Contemporary hit radio	Columbia	
United States	October 3, 2000	12-inch vinyl	Columbia	
France	November 6, 2000	Maxi CD	Columbia	
Australia	November 10, 2000	Maxi CD	Sony Music	
Germany	November 11, 2000	Maxi CD	Sony Music	
United Kingdom	November 20, 2000	Cassette; maxi CD (Note: In the UK, "Independent Women Part I" was made available in two maxi CD variants.)	Columbia	
New Zealand	November 27, 2000	Cassette; CD	Columbia	
United States	December 5, 2000	Maxi CD	Columbia	

== See also ==
- List of Billboard Hot 100 number ones of 2000
- List of Billboard Hot 100 number ones of 2001
- List of number-one R&B singles of 2000 (U.S.)
- List of Billboard Hot Dance Music/Club Play number ones of 2000
- List of number-one singles from the 2000s (New Zealand)
- List of UK Singles Chart number ones of the 2000s
- List of UK R&B Singles Chart number ones of 2000
