= Dance with Me (Debelah Morgan song) =

2000 song by Debelah Morgan

Single by Debelah Morgan

from the album Dance with Me
- Released: June 19, 2000
- Studio: HITTOWN (New York City); A to Z/Bazzbo (La Verne, California); The Masters Crib (Canyon Country, California)
- Genre: Latin R&B · tango
- Length: 3:40
- Label: Atlantic
- Songwriters: Richard Adler; Jerry Ross; Debelah Morgan; Giloh Morgan
- Producer: Giloh Morgan

Debelah Morgan singles chronology
"I Love You" (1998)	"Dance with Me" (2000)	"I Remember" (2000)

"Dance with Me" is a song by American R&B singer Debelah Morgan, released on June 19, 2000, as the first single from Morgan's Dance with Me. Morgan co-wrote the song with her brother, Giloh Morgan, who also produced it. Richard Adler and Jerry Ross received songwriting credits as well for the reworking of their composition "Hernando's Hideaway".

The song peaked at number eight on the US Billboard Hot 100 chart on January 6, 2001. The single also reached number three in Australia—where it was certified platinum for sales exceeding 70,000 copies—and number 10 in Romania and the United Kingdom. "Dance with Me" received international acclaim and has been performed in different versions, including a special Walt Disney version and a Spanish version entitled "Baila Conmigo".

== Track listings ==
US CD and cassette single

1. "Dance with Me" (album version) – 3:42
2. "Dance with Me" (Soul Central mix) – 4:10
3. "Dance with Me" (Boom Boom remix) – 3:55

US 7-inch single

A. "Dance with Me" (album version) – 3:41
B. "Dance with Me" (Soul Central mix) – 4:07

European CD single

1. "Dance with Me" (album version) – 3:42
2. "Dance with Me" (JP radio mix) – 3:34

UK and Australian CD single

1. "Dance with Me" (album version) – 3:42
2. "Dance with Me" (Soul Central mix) – 4:10
3. "Dance with Me" (Boom Boom remix) – 3:55
4. "Dance with Me" (JP radio mix) – 3:34
5. "Dance with Me" (Jack & Jill edit) – 3:44

== Credits and personnel ==
Credits are lifted from the European CD single liner notes.

Studios

- Recorded at HITTOWN Studios (New York City), A to Z/Bazzbo Studios (La Verne, California), and the Masters Crib (Canyon Country, California)
- Mixed at the Hit Factory (New York City)
- Mastered at Sterling Sound (New York City)

Personnel

- Richard Adler – writing
- Jerry Ross – writing
- Debelah Morgan – writing, lead vocals, background vocals, production, vocal arrangement
- Giloh Morgan – writing, background vocals, drum programming, all keyboards, production, vocal arrangement, recording
- Darrell Crooks – guitar
- Bashiri Johnson – percussion
- Scott Lovelis – recording
- "Bonzai" Jimi Caruso – mixing
- Chuck Bailey – mixing assistant
- Michael McCoy – mixing assistant
- Dan Milazzo – mixing assistant
- Greg Calbi – mastering
- David Sonenberg – executive production
- Scot McCracken – executive production
- Andrea Brooks – art direction and design
- Roy Zipstein – photography

== Charts ==
=== Weekly charts ===
Chart (2000–2001)	Peak position
Australia (ARIA)	3
Australian Dance (ARIA)	1
Australian Urban (ARIA)	1
Austria (Ö3 Austria Top 40)	16
Europe (Eurochart Hot 100)	28
Germany (GfK)	14
Ireland (IRMA)	39
New Zealand (Recorded Music NZ)	11
Romania (Romanian Top 100)	10
Scottish Singles Sales (Official Charts)	22
Switzerland (Schweizer Hitparade)	18
UK Singles (Official Charts)	10
UK Dance (Official Charts)	17
UK Hip Hop/R&B (Official Charts)	1
US Billboard Hot 100	8
US Dance Club Play (Billboard)	4
US Hot R&B/Hip-Hop Singles & Tracks (Billboard)	27
US Mainstream Top 40 (Billboard)	8
US Maxi-Singles Sales (Billboard)	9
US Rhythmic Top 40 (Billboard)	23

=== Year-end charts ===
Chart (2000)	Position
US Billboard Hot 100	89
US Mainstream Top 40 (Billboard)	71
US Maxi-Singles Sales (Billboard)	47
US Rhythmic Top 40 (Billboard)	64

Chart (2001)	Position
Australia (ARIA)	31
Australian Dance (ARIA)	6
Germany (Media Control)	96
Romania (Romanian Top 100)	57
UK Singles (OCC)	146
US Billboard Hot 100	93
US Hot R&B/Hip-Hop Singles & Tracks (Billboard)	82
US Mainstream Top 40 (Billboard)	54
US Rhythmic Top 40 (Billboard)	57

== Certifications ==
Region	Certification	Certified units/sales
Australia (ARIA)	Platinum	70,000^{^}
^{^} Shipments figures based on certification alone.

== Release history ==
Region	Date	Format(s)	Label(s)	Ref.
United States	June 19, 2000	Urban radio	Atlantic	
United States	June 20, 2000	Rhythmic contemporary; contemporary hit radio	Atlantic	
United States	July 11, 2000	CD	Atlantic	
United Kingdom	February 12, 2001	CD	Atlantic	
