= Debelah Morgan =

American singer and songwriter (born 1977)

- Born: Debelah Laksh Morgan
- Origin: Detroit, Michigan, U.S.
- Genres: R&B, pop, dance, gospel
- Occupations: Singer, songwriter
- Years active: 1994–present
- Labels: Atlantic Records (1994–1996; 1999–2002); VAZ/Motown Records (1997–1998); Champion Center (2010–present)

Debelah Laksh Morgan (born September 29, 1973) is an American singer and songwriter. Morgan is best known for her 2000 single "Dance with Me", which peaked at number eight on the Billboard Hot 100.

== Career ==
She signed with Atlantic Records in 1994, and released her debut album Debelah, which featured the singles "Take It Easy" and "Free", both of which charted on the R&B charts. A couple of years later, she moved to VAZ/Motown Records and released her single "Yesterday" which was a Top 30 R&B hit, and landed on the Pop charts. However, while her second album, It's Not Over, was released in Japan and a few other international territories, it was shelved in the United States in 1998.

Two years later, she re-signed with Atlantic Records and released her biggest single to date, "Dance with Me", which peaked at number 8 on the Billboard Hot 100 in addition to becoming a top-five dance hit. Her third studio album, Dance with Me, soon followed in 2000 and peaked at number 35 on the Billboard Top Heatseekers chart. Two additional singles ("I Remember" and "Close to You") were released from the album. Additionally, she contributed the song "Why Did You Have to Be" to the Osmosis Jones soundtrack and a cover of "Do You Remember?" to the Phil Collins tribute album, Urban Renewal.

In 2005, she signed with the independent label RansomWear and released her fourth album Light at the End of the Tunnel (a gospel release), which was preceded by the single "Just as I Am". The album remains out of print and was not available on any digital services until February 24, 2026 when Giloh Morgan (Debelah's brother) released it with the title "Sweet Hour of Prayer"

In 2010, she released the live album Let the Worship in Champions Live 2 with her Las Vegas church, of which she is their worship leader. The following year, she was slated to have shot a pilot for a reality series with R&B singers Shanice and Karyn White.

In 2012 and 2013, she performed with the R&B group Rose Royce as their lead vocalist for several shows.

In 2015, she collaborated with Shanice and All-4-One on the track "Go to Bed" off the latter's album Twenty.

== Discography ==
=== Studio albums ===
List of albums, with selected details and chart positions
Title	Details	Peak chart positions				
Title	Details	AUS	AUT	GER	NZ	SWI
Debelah	Released: June 14, 1994; Label: Atlantic	—	—	—	—	—
It's Not Over	Released: September 15, 1998; Label: VAZ / Motown	—	—	—	—	—
Dance with Me	Released: August 15, 2000; Label: The DAS Label / Atlantic	20	62	53	39	64
Light at the End of the Tunnel	Released: March 14, 2005; Label: Ransomwear Music	—	—	—	—	—

=== Singles ===
List of singles, with selected chart positions and certifications
Title	Year	Peak chart positions					Certifications	Album
Title	Year	US	US R&B	US Dance	AUS	UK	Certifications	Album
"Take It Easy"	1994	—	56	—	—	—		Debelah
"Free"	1994	—	96	—	—	—		Debelah
"Yesterday"	1998	56	28	45	—	—		It's Not Over
"I Love You"	1998	—	—	—	—	—		It's Not Over
"Dance with Me"	2000	8	27	4	3	10	ARIA: Platinum	Dance with Me
"I Remember"	2001	—	—	—	55	—		Dance with Me
"Close to You"	2001	—	—	—	—	—		Dance with Me
"Why Did You Have to Be?"	2001	—	—	—	—	—		Osmosis Jones
"Just as I Am"	2005	—	—	—	—	—		Light at the End of the Tunnel
