= Public Domain (band) =

British electronic music group

Public Domain are a British electronic music group, whose music includes acid and hard techno elements. They had their biggest hit towards the end of 2000, "Operation Blade (Bass in the Place)", (Note: The song was also released under the title "Operation Blade (Bass in the Place London...)".) which peaked at No. 5 on the UK Singles Chart and the top 10 in Australia, Austria, Germany and Norway. It sold one million copies internationally. In 2001, they released their only album, Hard Hop Superstars.

The original line-up of the group featured James Allan, Mark Sherry and Alistair MacIsaac. Mallorca Lee and David Forbes were added to the group before their chart breakthrough. In 2002, after two further top 40 singles in the form of "Rock da Funky Beats" (No. 19) and "Too Many MCs" (No. 34), Lee and Forbes both left, and MacIsaac followed them. Neil Skinner joined the line-up.

== Discography ==
=== Albums ===
List of studio albums, with selected chart positions
Title	Details	Peak chart positions	
Title	Details	AUS	NZ
Hard Hop Superstars	Released: 2001; Label: Epidrome; Format: CD	65	24

=== Singles ===
List of singles, with selected chart positions and certifications
Title	Year	Peak chart positions										Certifications	Album
Title	Year	UK	AUS	AUT	BEL (FL)	FRA	GER	NLD	NOR	SWE	SWI	Certifications	Album
"Operation Blade (Bass in the Place)"	2000	5	7	6	24	77	4	32	10	59	49		
Rock da Funky Beats (featuring Chuck D")	2001	19	39	38	—	—	59	—	—	—	—	BPI: Silver; ARIA: Platinum	
"Too Many MCs"/"Let Me Clear My Throat"	2002	34	—	—	—	—	—	—	—	—	—		
"Operation Blade"/"Blood Is Pumpin'" (with VooDoo & Serano)	2003	77	—	—	—	—	—	—	—	—	—		Non-album singles
"Make the Connection"/"Dangerous Minds"	2004	90	—	—	—	—	—	—	—	—	—		Non-album singles
"—" denotes a recording that did not chart or was not released in that territory.
