= Operation Blade (Bass in the Place) =

2000 single by Public Domain

- Maxi-CD cover artwork

Single by Public Domain

from the album Hard Hop Superstars
- Released: 20 November 2000
- Genre: Hard trance; acid
- Length: 8:22 (original mix); 3:07 (radio edit)
- Label: Xtrahard
- Songwriters: Mark Sherry; Alistair MacIsaac; James Allan
- Producers: Mark Sherry; Alistair MacIsaac; James Allan

Public Domain singles chronology
"Operation Blade (Bass in the Place)" (2000)	"Rock da Funky Beats" (2001)

Audio
- "Operation Blade" (7-inch radio edit) on YouTube

"Operation Blade (Bass in the Place)" (also titled "Operation Blade (Bass in the Place London)") is a hard trance song by Scottish electronic music group Public Domain, written and produced by the group's three members: Mark Sherry, Alistair MacIsaac, and James Allan. It samples a remix of New Order's song "Confusion", which was featured in the 1998 superhero horror film Blade, the source of the track's title. "Operation Blade" is also based on the theme to the 1982 science-fiction film Blade Runner.

The song was released on 20 November 2000 as Public Domain's debut single. On 26 November, it debuted at number five on the UK Singles Chart and stayed at that position for another week. Throughout December 2000 and early 2001, the track charted in at least 10 other countries, peaking within the top 10 in Australia, Austria, Germany, and Norway. It was also critically successful, with British publication NME calling it "hardcore brilliance". In April 2001, it was included on Public Domain's only studio album, Hard Hop Superstars.

== Critical reception ==
British music journalism website NME called "Operation Blade" a "gleefully manic song" and described it as "no-frills hardcore brilliance". Matthias Völlm of Swiss CHR radio station Radio 105 called the song "good" but doubted its airplay potential.

== Track listings ==
UK, European, and Australian CD single

1. "Operation Blade (Bass in the Place)" (7-inch radio edit)
2. "Operation Blade (Bass in the Place)" (original mix)
3. "Operation Blade (Bass in the Place)" (B'n'G vs Musico remix)

UK 12-inch single

A. "Operation Blade (Bass in the Place)" (original mix)
B. "Operation Blade (Bass in the Place)" (B'n'G vs Musico remix)

UK cassette single

A. "Operation Blade (Bass in the Place)" (7-inch radio edit)
B. "Operation Blade (Bass in the Place)" (B'n'G vs Musico remix)

UK 12-inch single (2006 remix)

A. "Operation Blade (Bass in the Place)" (2006 remix) – 8:15
B. "Operation Blade (Bass in the Place)" (2006 XXX remix) – 7:54

== Charts ==
=== Weekly charts ===
Chart (2000–2001)	Peak position
Australia (ARIA)	7
Australian Club Chart (ARIA)	1
Australian Dance (ARIA)	1
Austria (Ö3 Austria Top 40)	6
Belgium (Ultratop 50 Flanders)	24
Europe (Eurochart Hot 100)	22
France (SNEP)	77
Germany (GfK)	4
Ireland (IRMA)	11
Netherlands (Dutch Top 40)	36
Netherlands (Single Top 100)	32
Norway (VG-lista)	10
Scotland Singles (OCC)	2
Sweden (Sverigetopplistan)	59
Switzerland (Schweizer Hitparade)	49
UK Singles (OCC)	5
UK Dance (OCC)	1

=== Year-end charts ===
Chart (2000)	Position
UK Singles (OCC)	43

Chart (2001)	Position
Australia (ARIA)	25
Australian Club Chart (ARIA)	12
Australian Dance (ARIA)	2
Austria (Ö3 Austria Top 40)	44
Europe (Eurochart Hot 100)	82
Germany (Media Control)	60
UK Singles (OCC)	188

== Certifications ==
Region	Certification	Certified units/sales
Australia (ARIA)	Platinum	70,000^{^}
United Kingdom (BPI)	Silver	200,000^{^}
^{^} Shipments figures based on certification alone.

== Release history ==
Region	Date	Format(s)	Label(s)	ID	Ref.
United Kingdom	20 November 2000	12-inch vinyl	Xtrahard	X2H112	
Europe	8 January 2001	CD	Xtrahard	XTR 670670	
Australia	15 January 2001	CD	Xtrahard; Xtravaganza	670670.2	
United Kingdom	December 2005	12-inch vinyl (2006 remix)	Xtrahard	BLADE2006	
