= List of UK top-ten singles in 2001 =

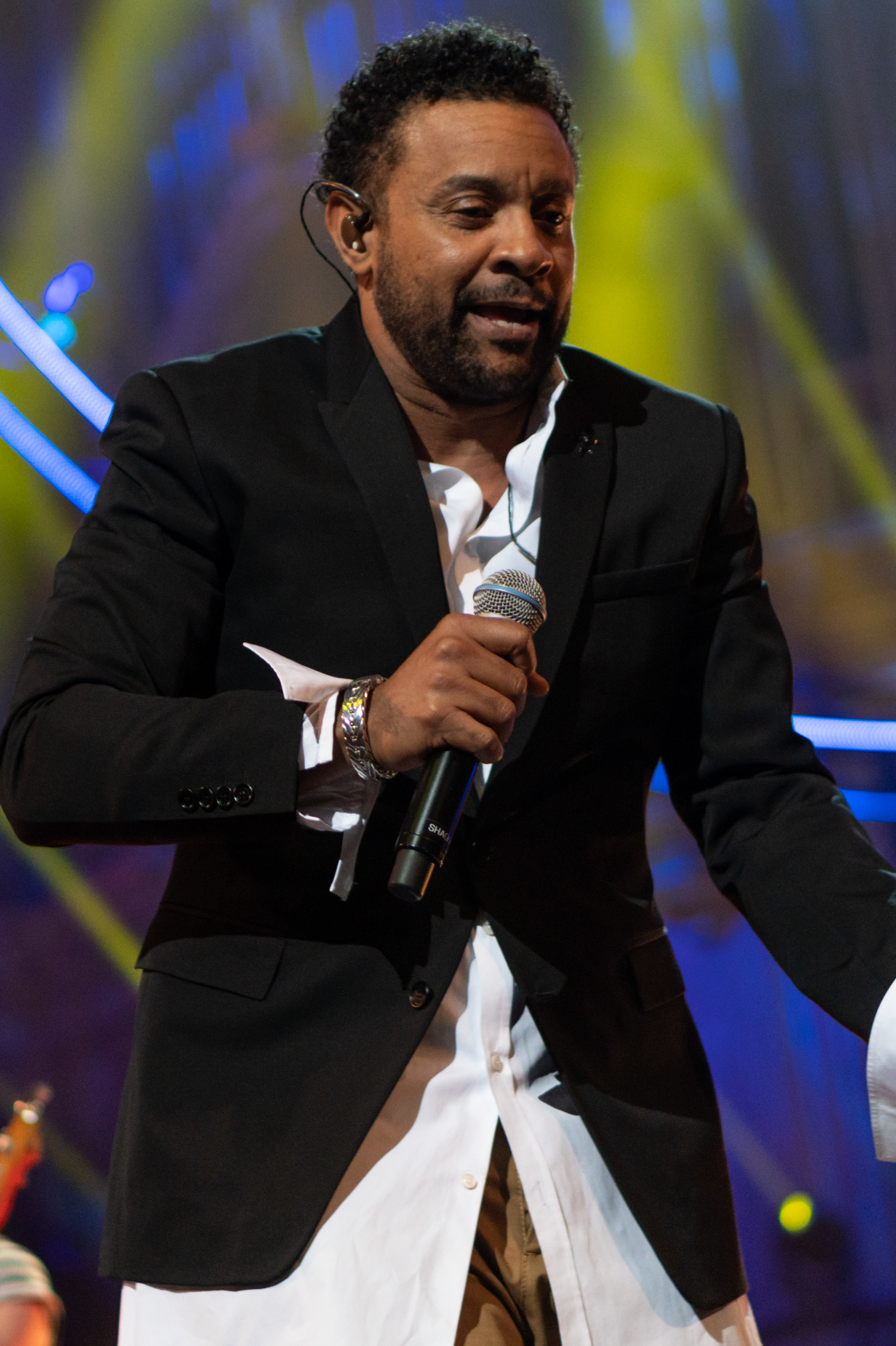
Shaggy (pictured in 2018) had the best-selling single of 2001 with "It Wasn't Me". The song featuring Rikrok sold 1.15 million copies. Shaggy had two further top 10 entries this year, including "Angel", which also topped the chart.

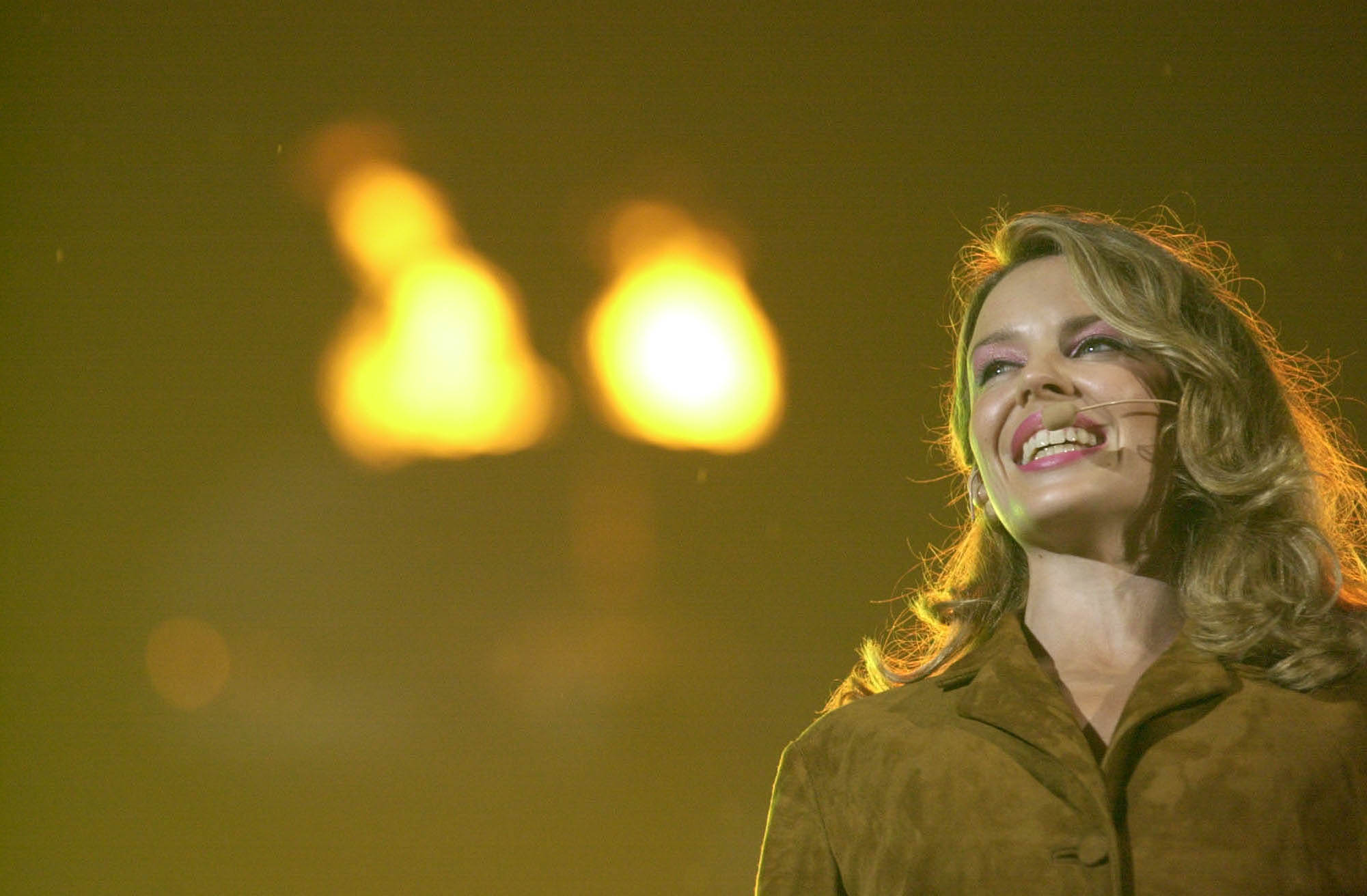
Kylie Minogue had another successful year, as "Can't Get You Out of My Head", which spent four weeks at number-one, became one of the biggest hits of her career, as well as the third best-selling song of this year.

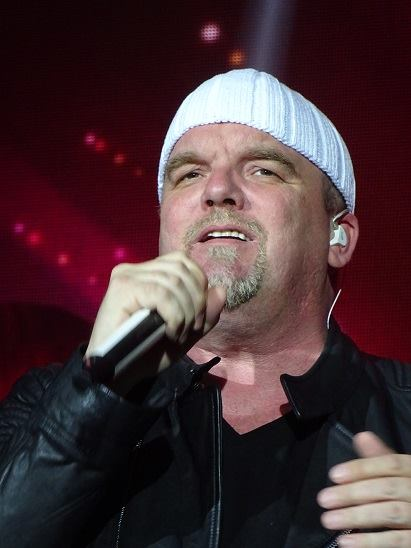
Austrian musician DJ Ötzi (pictured in 2016) reached number-one in the UK in September 2001 with "Hey Baby (Uhh, Ahh)", a cover version of the Bruce Channel song "Hey! Baby", which lasted ten weeks in the top 10. It went on to become the fifth best selling single of the year. DJ Ötzi had a second top 10 hit later in the year with his cover of "Do Wah Diddy Diddy", which reached number nine.

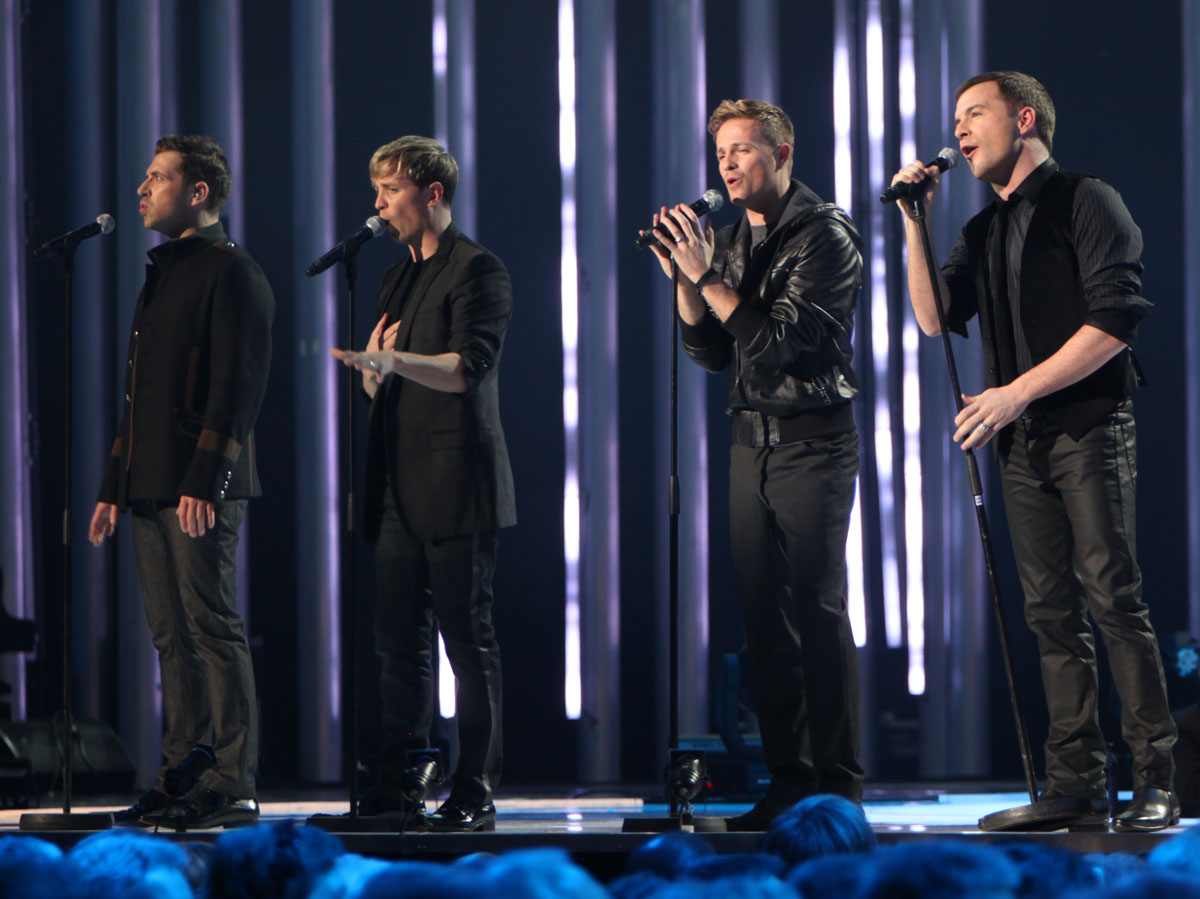
Irish boy band Westlife (original member Brian McFadden not pictured) were responsible for this year's Comic Relief single, a reworking of Billy Joel's "Uptown Girl" which reached number-one in March. They had a second chart-topper in November with "Queen of My Heart".

The UK Singles Chart is one of many music charts compiled by the Official Charts Company that calculates the best-selling singles of the week in the United Kingdom. Before 2004, the chart was only based on the sales of physical singles with airplay figures and digital downloads excluded from the official chart. This list shows singles that peaked in the Top 10 of the UK Singles Chart during 2001, as well as singles which peaked in 2000 but were in the top 10 in 2001. The entry date is when the song appeared in the top 10 for the first time (week ending, as published by the Official Charts Company, which is six days after the chart is announced).

Two hundred singles were in the top ten in 2001. Ten singles from 2000 remained in the top 10 for several weeks at the beginning of the year. Seventy-three artists scored multiple entries in the top 10 in 2001. Blue, Daniel Bedingfield, Linkin Park, Nelly Furtado, Sophie Ellis-Bextor and Outkast were among the many artists who achieved their first UK charting top 10 single in 2001.

The 2000 Christmas number-one, "Can We Fix It?" by Bob the Builder (voiced by Neil Morrissey and the theme song from the children's television series), remained at number-one for the first week of 2001. The first new number-one single of the year was "Touch Me" by Rui da Silva. Overall, thirty-one different singles peaked at number-one in 2001, with Atomic Kitten, Blue, Bob the Builder, Robbie Williams, S Club 7, Shaggy and Westlife (all 2) having the most singles hit that position.

== Background ==
=== Multiple entries ===
Two hundred singles charted in the top 10 in 2000, with one-hundred and ninety singles reaching their peak this year (including the re-entry "Set You Free" which charted in previous years but reached a peak on its latest chart run).

Seventy-three artists scored multiple entries in the top 10 in 2001. Jennifer Lopez and the three members of Destiny's Child (Beyoncé, Kelly Rowland and Michelle Williams) shared the record for most top 10 hits in 1986 with five hit singles each. Both of these artists totals included a guest spot on the charity single "What's Going On" by Artists Against AIDS Worldwide (also known as All Star Tribute). American girl group Destiny's Child were one of two artists along with Steps to have more than three singles reach the top 10. "Independent Women" and "Survivor" both reached number-one in the UK. "Bootylicious" peaked at number two and "Emotion" landed one place lower at number three. The group were to go on hiatus the following year, with Beyoncé and Kelly Rowland both launching solo careers, making this one of their last years together until they reformed.

Jennifer Lopez was the other artist with five top ten entries, including the charity single. "Love Don't Cost a Thing" scaled the chart to reach number one, while "Play" and "Ain't It Funny" reached number three and "I'm Real" ranked at number four.

Steps were one of four acts who had four hit singles in 2001, the best of these both double-A side singles. "Chain Reaction"/"One for Sorrow (Tony Moran US Remix)" and "It's the Way You Make Me Feel" peaked at number two. Of their other singles, "Here and Now / You'll Be Sorry" reached number 4 and "Words Are Not Enough"/"I Know Him So Well" took fifth position on the chart.

Bono and The Edge, both from the band U2, also featured on "What's Going On" and recorded three top 10 singles with their band. "Stuck in a Moment You Can't Get Out Of" had the most chart success, peaking at number two in February. "Elevation" reached number three in July and their final hit of the year was "Walk On", making number five in December. Finally, Usher made the top 10 on three occasions in 2001: the American singer took "Pop Ya Collar" to number 2, "U Remind Me" charted one place lower and "U Got It Bad" landed at number five in October.

Dido was one of a number of artists with 3 top-ten entries, including "Stan", "Here with Me" and Thank You". Blue, Mis-Teeq, Samantha Mumba, Robbie Williams and Stereophonics were among the other artists who had multiple top 10 entries in 2001.

=== Chart debuts ===
Seventy-four artists achieved their first top 10 single in 2001, either as a lead or featured artist. Of these, eleven went on to record another hit single that year: Alicia Keys, BBMak, D12, Dido DJ Ötzi, Gorillaz, Ian Van Dahl, Lil' Kim, M.O.P., O-Town, So Solid Crew, Sophie Ellis-Bextor and Wheatus. Blue, Eve, Hear'Say, Mis-Teeq and Nelly Furtado all had two other entries in their breakthrough year.

The following table (collapsed) does not include acts who had previously charted as part of a group and secured their first top 10 solo single.

Artist	Number of top 10s	First entry	Chart position	Other entries
Rui da Silva	1	"Touch Me"	1	—
Maria Rubia	1	"Everytime You Need Me"	3	—
Feeder	1	"Buck Rogers"	5	—
Mis-Teeq	3	"Why?"	8	"All I Want" (2), "One Night Stand" (5)
Santos	1	"Camels"	9	—
Spooks	1	"Things I've Seen"	6	—
Safri Duo	1	"Played-A-Live (The Bongo Song)"	6	—
Planet Funk	1	"Chase the Sun"	5	—
Wheatus	2	"Teenage Dirtbag"	2	"A Little Respect" (3)
Papa Roach	1	"Last Resort"	3	—
Mystikal	1	"Stutter"	7	—
Dido	2	"Here with Me"	4	"Thank You" (3)
BBMak	2	"Back Here"	5	"Still on Your Side" (8)
Debelah Morgan	1	"Dance with Me"	10	—
Outkast	1	"Ms. Jackson"	2	—
Stuntmasterz	1	"The Ladyboy is Mine"	10	—
Rikrok	1	"It Wasn't Me"	1	—
Nelly Furtado	3	"I'm Like a Bird"	5	"Turn Off the Light" (4), "What's Going On" (6)
Gorillaz	2	"Clint Eastwood"	4	"19-2000" (6)
D12	2	"Shit on You"	10	"Purple Pills" (2)
Hear'Say	3	"Pure and Simple"	1	"The Way to Your Love" (1), "Everybody" (4)
Crazy Town	1	"Butterfly"	3	—
M&S	1	"Salsoul Nugget (If U Wanna)"	6	—
O-Town	2	"Liquid Dreams"	3	"All or Nothing" (4)
M.O.P.	2	"Cold as Ice"	4	"Ante Up" (7)
City Spud	1	"Ride wit Me"	3	—
Eve	3	"Who's That Girl?"	6	"Let Me Blow Ya Mind" (4), "What's Going On" (6)
A-Teens	1	"Upside Down"	10	—
DJ Pied Piper	1	"Do You Really Like It?"	1	—
Blue	3	"All Rise"	4	"Too Close" (1), "If You Come Back" (1)
3LW	1	"No More (Baby I'ma Do Right)"	6	—
Sunshine Anderson	1	"Heard It All Before"	9	—
Ray J	1	"Another Day in Paradise"	5	—
Lil' Kim	2	"Lady Marmalade"	1	"What's Going On" (6)
Faith Hill	1	"There You'll Be"	3	—
Roger Sanchez	1	"Another Chance"	1	—
OPM	1	"Heaven Is a Halfpipe"	4	—
Ian Van Dahl	2	"Castles in the Sky"	3	"Will I?" (5)
Cosmic Gate	1	"Fire Wire"	9	—
Train	1	"Drops of Jupiter (Tell Me)"	10	—
So Solid Crew	2	"21 Seconds"	1	"They Don't Know" (3)
Ludacris	1	"One Minute Man"	10	—
Sophie Ellis-Bextor	2	"Take Me Home"	2	"Murder on the Dancefloor" (2)
Kosheen	1	"Hide U (Remix)"	6	—
Uncle Kracker	1	"Follow Me"	3	—
Supermen Lovers	1	"Starlight"	2	—
DJ Ötzi	2	"Hey Baby (Uhh, Ahh)"	1	"Doo Wah Diddy" (9)
Alien Ant Farm	1	"Smooth Criminal"	3	—
Samantha Cole	1	"Luv Me, Luv Me"	5	—
Starsailor	1	"Alcoholic"	10	—
City High	1	"What Would You Do?"	3	—
Liberty	1	"Thinking It Over"	5	—
Bell & Spurling	1	"Sven, Sven, Sven"	7	—
Sum 41	1	"Fat Lip"	8	—
The Ones	1	"Flawless"	7	—
Linkin Park	1	"In the End"	8	—
Afroman	1	"Because I Got High"	1	—
iiO	1	"Rapture"	2	—
Alicia Keys	2	"Fallin'"	3	"What's Going On" (6)
The Dandy Warhols	1	"Bohemian Like You"	5	—
Artists Against AIDS Worldwide	1	"What's Going On"	6	—
Aaron Lewis	1	"What's Going On"	6	—
Jagged Edge	1	"What's Going On"	6	—
Ja Rule	1	"What's Going On"	6	—
Jermaine Dupri	1	"What's Going On"	6	—
Nona Gaye	1	"What's Going On"	6	—
Perry Farrell	1	"What's Going On"	6	—
Scott Weiland	1	"What's Going On"	6	—
Solange Knowles	1	"What's Going On"	6	—
Bubba Sparxxx	1	"Ugly"	7	—
Daniel Bedingfield	1	"Gotta Get thru This"	1	—
PPK	1	"ResuRection"	3	—
Hermes House Band	1	"Country Roads"	7	—
Nicole Kidman	1	"Somethin' Stupid"	1	—
Gordon Haskell	1	"How Wonderful You Are"	2	—

Notes

Dido made her official chart debut this year with "Here with Me", although she provided uncredited vocals on Eminem's 2000 number-one hit "Stan". Sophie Ellis-Bextor was the vocalist on Spiller's 2000 number-one hit "Groovejet (If This Ain't Love)", but was uncredited. "Take Me Home" was her first credited entry in the UK Singles Chart. Darren Hayes had several hit singles as part of Savage Garden in the 1990s, but he appeared on the charity single "What's Going On" as a solo artist. All of The Edge's previous chart success was with his band U2; he featured on "What's Going On" along with Bono. Fred Durst also made his debut independent of Limp Bizkit on this song, as did Chris Martin from Coldplay, Pat Monahan of Train and R.E.M.'s Michael Stipe. Scott Weiland (Stone Temple Pilots) and Perry Farrell (Jane's Addiction) also appeared as solo artists but neither of their groups had previously recorded a top ten single in the UK. T-Boz and Chilli, both from the girl group TLC also made their top 10 debut away from the group with this single. 3LW as a group had one top 10 entry, "No More (Baby I'ma Do Right)", but the three members (Adrienne Bailon, Kiely Williams and Naturi Naughton) all featured on "What's Going On".

=== Songs from films ===
Original songs from various films entered the top 10 throughout the year. These included "Inner Smile" (from Bend It Like Beckham), "Lady Marmalade" (Moulin Rouge!), "Out of Reach" and "It's Raining Men" (Bridget Jones' Diary), "There You'll Be" (Pearl Harbor), "What If" (Christmas Carol: The Movie), "What Would You Do?" (Life) and "Because I Got High" (Jay and Silent Bob Strike Back).

=== Charity singles ===
A number of singles recorded for charity reached the top 10 in the charts in 2001. The Comic Relief single was a cover of Billy Joel's "Uptown" by Westlife, peaking at number one on 17 March 2001.

S Club 7 recorded the Children in Need single for 2001, "Have You Ever". It was their fourth number-one single, reaching the top spot on 1 December 2001. Their song "Never Had a Dream Come True" was the Children in Need single the previous year, peaking at number-one, and it remained in the chart for the early part of the year.

A group of artists came together under the banner Artists Against AIDS Worldwide (also known as All Star Tribute) to produce a cover of Marvin Gaye's "What's Going On". This included Christina Aguilera, Backstreet Boys, Britney Spears, Jennifer Lopez, Nelly Furtado and Wyclef Jean. The song reached a high of number six on 17 November 2001.

=== Best-selling singles ===
Shaggy had the best-selling single of the year with "It Wasn't Me". The song spent ten weeks in the top 10 and sold 1.15 million copies and was certified 2× platinum by the BPI. "Pure and Simple" by Hear'Say came in second place, selling 1.07 million copies and losing out by around 80,000 sales. Kylie Minogue's "Can't Get You Out of My Head", "Whole Again" from Atomic Kitten and "Hey! Baby" by DJ Ötzi made up the top five. Singles by Westlife, S Club 7, Shaggy featuring Rayvon ("Angel"), Wheatus and Afroman were also in the top ten best-selling singles of the year.

"It Wasn't Me" (4), "Can't Get You Out of My Head" (7) and "Pure and Simple" (9) were all ranked in the top 10 best-selling singles of the decade.

== Top-ten singles ==
Symbol	Meaning
‡	Single peaked in 2000 but still in chart in 2001.
(#)	Year-end top-ten single position and rank
Entered	The date that the single first appeared in the chart.
Peak	Highest position that the single reached in the UK Singles Chart.

Entered (week ending)	Weeks in top 10	Single	Artist	Peak	Peak reached (week ending)	Weeks at peak
Singles in 2000
28 October 2000	12	"Who Let the Dogs Out?" ‡	Baha Men	2	28 October 2000	2
25 November 2000	7	"Can't Fight the Moonlight" ‡	LeAnn Rimes	1	25 November 2000	1
2 December 2000	7	"Independent Women" ‡	Destiny's Child	1	2 December 2000	1
2 December 2000	5	"Operation Blade (Bass in the Place)" ^{[A]}	Public Domain	5	2 December 2000	2
9 December 2000	6	"Never Had a Dream Come True" ‡ ^{[B]}	S Club 7	1	9 December 2000	1
16 December 2000	6	"Stan" ‡	Eminem featuring Dido	1	16 December 2000	1
16 December 2000	6	"Can We Fix It?" ‡	Bob the Builder ^{[C]}	1	23 December 2000	3
16 December 2000	2	"Stronger" ^{[D]}	Britney Spears	7	16 December 2000	1
30 December 2000	3	"No Good 4 Me" ‡	Oxide & Neutrino featuring Megaman; MC Romeo & Lisa Maffia	6	30 December 2000	2
30 December 2000	3	"What Makes a Man" ‡	Westlife	2	30 December 2000	1
Singles in 2001
13 January 2001	5	"Touch Me"	Rui da Silva featuring Cassandra	1	13 January 2001	1
13 January 2001	3	"It's the Way You Make Me Feel"	Steps	2	13 January 2001	1
13 January 2001	5	"Everytime You Need Me"	Fragma featuring Maria Rubia	3	13 January 2001	2
20 January 2001	3	"Love Don't Cost a Thing"	Jennifer Lopez	1	20 January 2001	1
20 January 2001	2	"Buck Rogers"	Feeder	5	20 January 2001	1
20 January 2001	1	"Inner Smile"	Texas	6	20 January 2001	1
20 January 2001	2	"Why?"	Mis-Teeq	8	20 January 2001	1
20 January 2001	1	"Camels"	Santos	9	20 January 2001	1
27 January 2001	5	"Rollin'"	Limp Bizkit	1	27 January 2001	2
27 January 2001	2	"Things I've Seen"	Spooks	6	27 January 2001	1
27 January 2001	1	"All Hooked Up"	All Saints	7	27 January 2001	1
27 January 2001	1	"You Make Me Sick"	Pink	9	27 January 2001	1
3 February 2001	3	"Pop Ya Collar"	Usher	2	3 February 2001	1
3 February 2001	2	"The Next Episode"	Dr. Dre featuring Snoop Dogg	3	3 February 2001	1
3 February 2001	1	"Played-A-Live (The Bongo Song)"	Safri Duo	6	3 February 2001	1
3 February 2001	1	"On the Radio"	Martine McCutcheon	7	3 February 2001	1
3 February 2001	1	"Dream to Me"	Dario G	9	3 February 2001	1
10 February 2001	11	"Whole Again" (#4)	Atomic Kitten	1	10 February 2001	4
10 February 2001	2	"Stuck in a Moment You Can't Get Out Of"	U2	2	10 February 2001	1
10 February 2001	2	"Case of the Ex"	Mya	3	10 February 2001	1
10 February 2001	1	"Chase the Sun"	Planet Funk	5	10 February 2001	1
10 February 2001	1	"Shining Light"	Ash	8	10 February 2001	1
17 February 2001	9	"Teenage Dirtbag" (#9)	Wheatus	2	17 February 2001	2
17 February 2001	2	"Last Resort"	Papa Roach	3	17 February 2001	1
17 February 2001	1	"Loco"	Fun Lovin' Criminals	5	17 February 2001	1
17 February 2001	1	"Stutter"	Joe featuring Mystikal	7	17 February 2001	1
17 February 2001	2	"Dancing in the Moonlight" ^{[E]}	Toploader	7	24 February 2001	1
24 February 2001	2	"American Dream"	Jakatta	3	24 February 2001	1
24 February 2001	3	"Here with Me"	Dido	4	24 February 2001	1
24 February 2001	1	"Back Here"	BBMak	5	24 February 2001	1
24 February 2001	1	"The Call"	Backstreet Boys	8	24 February 2001	1
24 February 2001	1	"Dance with Me"	Debelah Morgan	10	24 February 2001	1
3 March 2001	4	"Ms. Jackson"	Outkast	2	3 March 2001	1
3 March 2001	4	"Always Come Back to Your Love"	Samantha Mumba	3	3 March 2001	1
3 March 2001	1	"Feels So Good"	Melanie B	5	3 March 2001	1
3 March 2001	1	"No More"	A1	6	3 March 2001	1
3 March 2001	1	"Shut Up and Forget About It"	Dane Bowers	9	3 March 2001	1
3 March 2001	1	"The Ladyboy Is Mine"	Stuntmasterz	10	3 March 2001	1
10 March 2001	10	"It Wasn't Me" (#1)	Shaggy featuring Rikrok	1	10 March 2001	1
10 March 2001	2	"Nobody Wants to Be Lonely"	Ricky Martin with Christina Aguilera	4	10 March 2001	1
10 March 2001	5	"I'm Like a Bird"	Nelly Furtado	5	10 March 2001	1
10 March 2001	1	"So Why So Sad"	Manic Street Preachers	8	10 March 2001	1
10 March 2001	1	"Found That Soul"	Manic Street Preachers	9	10 March 2001	1
17 March 2001	6	"Uptown Girl" (#6) ^{[F]}	Westlife	1	17 March 2001	1
17 March 2001	8	"Clint Eastwood"	Gorillaz	4	17 March 2001	2
17 March 2001	1	"Shit on You"	D12	10	17 March 2001	1
24 March 2001	5	"Pure and Simple" (#2)	Hear'Say	1	24 March 2001	3
24 March 2001	2	"I Wanna Be U"	Chocolate Puma	6	24 March 2001	1
31 March 2001	2	"Mr Writer"	Stereophonics	5	31 March 2001	1
31 March 2001	1	"Rendezvous"	Craig David	8	31 March 2001	1
7 April 2001	3	"Butterfly"	Crazy Town	3	7 April 2001	1
7 April 2001	2	"Salsoul Nugget (If U Wanna)"	M&S Presents Girl Next Door	6	7 April 2001	1
14 April 2001	3	"What Took You So Long?"	Emma Bunton	1	14 April 2001	2
14 April 2001	1	"Bow Wow (That's My Name)"	Lil' Bow Wow featuring Snoop Dogg	6	14 April 2001	1
21 April 2001	2	"All for You"	Janet Jackson	3	21 April 2001	1
21 April 2001	6	"Out of Reach"	Gabrielle	4	21 April 2001	2
21 April 2001	1	"Let Love Be Your Energy"	Robbie Williams	10	21 April 2001	1
28 April 2001	4	"Survivor"	Destiny's Child	1	28 April 2001	1
28 April 2001	3	"Lovin' Each Day"	Ronan Keating	2	28 April 2001	1
28 April 2001	2	"Liquid Dreams"	O-Town	3	28 April 2001	1
28 April 2001	3	"Get Ur Freak On"	Missy Elliott	4	28 April 2001	1
28 April 2001	1	"What It Feels Like for a Girl"	Madonna	7	28 April 2001	1
5 May 2001	9	"Don't Stop Movin'" (#7) ^{[G]}	S Club 7	1	5 May 2001	2
5 May 2001	1	"Dream On"	Depeche Mode	6	5 May 2001	1
5 May 2001	1	"Star 69"/"Weapon of Choice"	Fatboy Slim	10	5 May 2001	1
12 May 2001	5	"It's Raining Men"	Geri Halliwell	1	12 May 2001	2
12 May 2001	3	"Play"	Jennifer Lopez	3	12 May 2001	1
12 May 2001	4	"Cold as Ice"	M.O.P.	4	12 May 2001	2
12 May 2001	1	"Imitation of Life"	R.E.M.	6	12 May 2001	1
19 May 2001	4	"Ride wit Me"	Nelly featuring City Spud	3	19 May 2001	2
19 May 2001	2	"You Are Alive"	Fragma	4	19 May 2001	1
19 May 2001	1	"Who's That Girl"	Eve	6	19 May 2001	1
19 May 2001	1	"One Wild Night"	Bon Jovi	10	19 May 2001	1
26 May 2001	1	"Up Middle Finger"	Oxide & Neutrino	7	26 May 2001	1
26 May 2001	1	"Still on Your Side"	BBMak	8	26 May 2001	1
26 May 2001	1	"Upside Down"	A-Teens	10	26 May 2001	1
2 June 2001	6	"Do You Really Like It?"	DJ Pied Piper and the Masters of Ceremonies	1	2 June 2001	1
2 June 2001	2	"Thank You"	Dido	3	2 June 2001	1
2 June 2001	5	"All Rise"	Blue	4	2 June 2001	1
2 June 2001	1	"Pyramid Song"	Radiohead	5	2 June 2001	1
2 June 2001	2	"No More (Baby I'ma Do Right)"	3LW	6	2 June 2001	1
2 June 2001	1	"Heard It All Before"	Sunshine Anderson	9	2 June 2001	1
9 June 2001	7	"Angel" (#8)	Shaggy featuring Rayvon	1	9 June 2001	3
9 June 2001	2	"Sing"	Travis	3	9 June 2001	1
9 June 2001	1	"Electric Avenue (Ringbang Remix)"	Eddy Grant	5	9 June 2001	1
16 June 2001	2	"We Come 1"	Faithless	3	16 June 2001	1
16 June 2001	1	"Here and Now"/"You'll Be Sorry"	Steps	4	16 June 2001	1
16 June 2001	4	"Another Day in Paradise"	Brandy & Ray J	5	16 June 2001	2
16 June 2001	1	"Romeo"	Basement Jaxx	6	16 June 2001	1
16 June 2001	1	"Close to You"	Marti Pellow	9	16 June 2001	1
23 June 2001	4	"All I Want"	Mis-Teeq	2	23 June 2001	1
23 June 2001	2	"Until the End of Time"	2Pac	4	23 June 2001	1
23 June 2001	1	"Have a Nice Day"	Stereophonics	5	23 June 2001	1
23 June 2001	2	"My Way"	Limp Bizkit	6	23 June 2001	1
30 June 2001	6	"Lady Marmalade"	Christina Aguilera, Lil' Kim, Mya & Pink	1	30 June 2001	1
30 June 2001	3	"There You'll Be"	Faith Hill	3	30 June 2001	1
7 July 2001	2	"The Way to Your Love"	Hear'Say	1	7 July 2001	1
7 July 2001	2	"U Remind Me"	Usher	3	7 July 2001	1
7 July 2001	2	"19/2000"	Gorillaz	6	7 July 2001	1
7 July 2001	1	"Another Lover"	Dane Bowers	9	7 July 2001	1
14 July 2001	3	"Another Chance"	Roger Sanchez	1	14 July 2001	1
14 July 2001	3	"A Little Respect"	Wheatus	3	14 July 2001	1
14 July 2001	6	"Heaven Is a Halfpipe"	OPM	4	14 July 2001	1
21 July 2001	5	"Eternity"/"The Road to Mandalay"	Robbie Williams	1	21 July 2001	2
21 July 2001	4	"Purple Pills"	D12	2	21 July 2001	2
21 July 2001	7	"Perfect Gentleman"	Wyclef Jean	4	21 July 2001	3
21 July 2001	7	"Castles in the Sky"	Ian Van Dahl	3	11 August 2001	1
21 July 2001	1	"Pop"	NSYNC	9	21 July 2001	1
28 July 2001	1	"Elevation"	U2	3	28 July 2001	1
28 July 2001	1	"Dance for Me"	Sisqó	6	28 July 2001	1
4 August 2001	5	"Eternal Flame"	Atomic Kitten	1	4 August 2001	2
4 August 2001	3	"Bootylicious"	Destiny's Child	2	4 August 2001	1
4 August 2001	2	"All or Nothing"	O-Town	4	4 August 2001	1
4 August 2001	1	"Firewire"	Cosmic Gate	9	4 August 2001	1
11 August 2001	1	"Scream If You Wanna Go Faster"	Geri Halliwell	8	11 August 2001	1
11 August 2001	1	"Drops of Jupiter (Tell Me)"	Train	10	11 August 2001	1
18 August 2001	5	"21 Seconds"	So Solid Crew	1	18 August 2001	1
18 August 2001	2	"Ain't It Funny"	Jennifer Lopez	3	18 August 2001	1
18 August 2001	1	"Ante Up"	M.O.P. featuring Busta Rhymes, Teflon & Remy Martin	7	18 August 2001	1
18 August 2001	1	"One Minute Man"	Missy Elliott featuring Ludacris	10	18 August 2001	1
25 August 2001	5	"Let's Dance"	Five	1	25 August 2001	2
25 August 2001	4	"Take Me Home"	Sophie Ellis-Bextor	2	25 August 2001	1
25 August 2001	4	"Let Me Blow Ya Mind"	Eve featuring Gwen Stefani	4	25 August 2001	1
25 August 2001	3	"Little L"	Jamiroquai	5	25 August 2001	1
25 August 2001	1	"Crystal"	New Order	8	25 August 2001	1
1 September 2001	2	"Turn Off the Light"	Nelly Furtado	4	1 September 2001	1
1 September 2001	1	"Hide U (Remix)" ^{[H]}	Kosheen	6	1 September 2001	1
8 September 2001	3	"Too Close"	Blue	1	8 September 2001	1
8 September 2001	4	"Follow Me"	Uncle Kracker	3	8 September 2001	1
8 September 2001	3	"Stuck in the Middle with You"	Louise	4	8 September 2001	1
8 September 2001	1	"Take My Breath Away"	Emma Bunton	5	8 September 2001	1
15 September 2001	5	"Mambo No. 5"	Bob the Builder ^{[C]}	1	15 September 2001	1
15 September 2001	3	"Starlight"	The Supermen Lovers featuring Mani Hoffman	2	15 September 2001	1
15 September 2001	1	"TwentyFourSeven"	Artful Dodger featuring Melanie Blatt	6	15 September 2001	1
22 September 2001	10	"Hey Baby (Uhh, Ahh)" (#5)	DJ Ötzi	1	22 September 2001	1
22 September 2001	2	"Set You Free (2001 Remixes)" ^{[I]}	N-Trance	4	22 September 2001	1
22 September 2001	1	"Baby, Come Over (This Is Our Night)"	Samantha Mumba	5	22 September 2001	1
22 September 2001	1	"It Began in Afrika"	The Chemical Brothers	8	22 September 2001	1
29 September 2001	7	"Can't Get You Out of My Head" (#3)	Kylie Minogue	1	29 September 2001	4
29 September 2001	6	"Smooth Criminal"	Alien Ant Farm	3	29 September 2001	1
29 September 2001	2	"Luv Me, Luv Me" ^{[J]}	Shaggy featuring Samantha Cole	5	29 September 2001	1
29 September 2001	1	"Not Such an Innocent Girl"	Victoria Beckham	6	29 September 2001	1
29 September 2001	1	"Alcoholic"	Starsailor	10	29 September 2001	1
6 October 2001	4	"Chain Reaction"/"One for Sorrow"	Steps	2	6 October 2001	1
6 October 2001	6	"What Would You Do?"	City High	3	13 October 2001	1
6 October 2001	2	"Thinking It Over"	Liberty	5	6 October 2001	1
6 October 2001	3	"Family Affair"	Mary J. Blige	8	6 October 2001	1
6 October 2001	1	"I Want Love"	Elton John	9	6 October 2001	1
13 October 2001	1	"Sven, Sven, Sven"	Bell & Spurling	7	13 October 2001	1
13 October 2001	1	"Fat Lip"	Sum 41	8	13 October 2001	1
20 October 2001	3	"You Rock My World"	Michael Jackson	2	20 October 2001	1
20 October 2001	1	"U Got It Bad"	Usher	5	20 October 2001	1
20 October 2001	1	"Flawless"	The Ones	7	20 October 2001	1
20 October 2001	1	"In the End"	Linkin Park	8	20 October 2001	1
27 October 2001	6	"Because I Got High" (#10)	Afroman	1	27 October 2001	3
27 October 2001	2	"I'm a Slave 4 U"	Britney Spears	4	27 October 2001	1
27 October 2001	3	"One Night Stand"	Mis-Teeq	5	27 October 2001	1
3 November 2001	2	"Closer to Me"	Five	4	3 November 2001	1
3 November 2001	1	"Don't Need the Sun to Shine (To Make Me Smile)"	Gabrielle	9	3 November 2001	1
10 November 2001	4	"Rapture"	iiO	2	10 November 2001	1
10 November 2001	4	"Fallin'"	Alicia Keys	3	10 November 2001	1
10 November 2001	2	"I'm Real"	Jennifer Lopez	4	10 November 2001	1
10 November 2001	2	"Bohemian Like You" ^{[K]}	The Dandy Warhols	5	10 November 2001	1
17 November 2001	4	"Queen of My Heart"	Westlife	1	17 November 2001	1
17 November 2001	2	"They Don't Know"	So Solid Crew	3	17 November 2001	1
17 November 2001	1	"What's Going On" ^{[L]}	Artists Against AIDS Worldwide	6	17 November 2001	1
17 November 2001	1	"The Music's No Good Without You"	Cher	8	17 November 2001	1
24 November 2001	3	"If You Come Back"	Blue	1	24 November 2001	1
24 November 2001	2	"Emotion"	Destiny's Child	3	24 November 2001	1
24 November 2001	1	"(I Wish I Knew How It Would Feel to Be) Free/One"	Lighthouse Family	6	24 November 2001	1
24 November 2001	1	"Ugly"	Bubba Sparxxx	7	24 November 2001	1
1 December 2001	7	"Have You Ever" ^{[M]}	S Club 7	1	1 December 2001	1
1 December 2001	3	"Who Do You Love Now? (Stringer)"	Riva featuring Dannii Minogue	3	1 December 2001	1
1 December 2001	1	"Walk On"	U2	5	1 December 2001	1
1 December 2001	1	"Do Wah Diddy"	DJ Ötzi	9	1 December 2001	1
8 December 2001	8	"Gotta Get Thru This" ^{[N]}	Daniel Bedingfield	1	8 December 2001	3
8 December 2001	3	"ResuRection"	PPK	3	8 December 2001	1
8 December 2001	1	"Everybody"	Hear'Say	4	8 December 2001	1
8 December 2001	4	"What If" ^{[O]}	Kate Winslet	6	8 December 2001	1
8 December 2001	1	"Calling"	Geri Halliwell	7	8 December 2001	1
8 December 2001	1	"Where's Your Head At"	Basement Jaxx	9	8 December 2001	1
15 December 2001	6	"Murder on the Dancefloor"	Sophie Ellis-Bextor	2	15 December 2001	2
15 December 2001	6	"Handbags and Gladrags"	Stereophonics	4	15 December 2001	2
15 December 2001	1	"Words Are Not Enough"/"I Know Him So Well"	Steps	5	15 December 2001	1
15 December 2001	5	"Country Roads"	Hermes House Band	7	15 December 2001	1
15 December 2001	3	"I Believe in Christmas"	Tweenies	9	15 December 2001	3
22 December 2001	4	"Somethin' Stupid"	Robbie Williams & Nicole Kidman	1	22 December 2001	3
22 December 2001	4	"Will I?"	Ian Van Dahl	5	22 December 2001	1
22 December 2001	4	"Lately"	Samantha Mumba	6	22 December 2001	2
29 December 2001	2	"How Wonderful You Are"	Gordon Haskell	2	29 December 2001	1

== Entries by artist ==
The following table shows artists who achieved two or more top 10 entries in 2001, including singles that reached their peak in 2000. The figures include both main artists and featured artists, while appearances on ensemble charity records are also counted for each artist. The total number of weeks an artist spent in the top ten in 2001 is also shown.

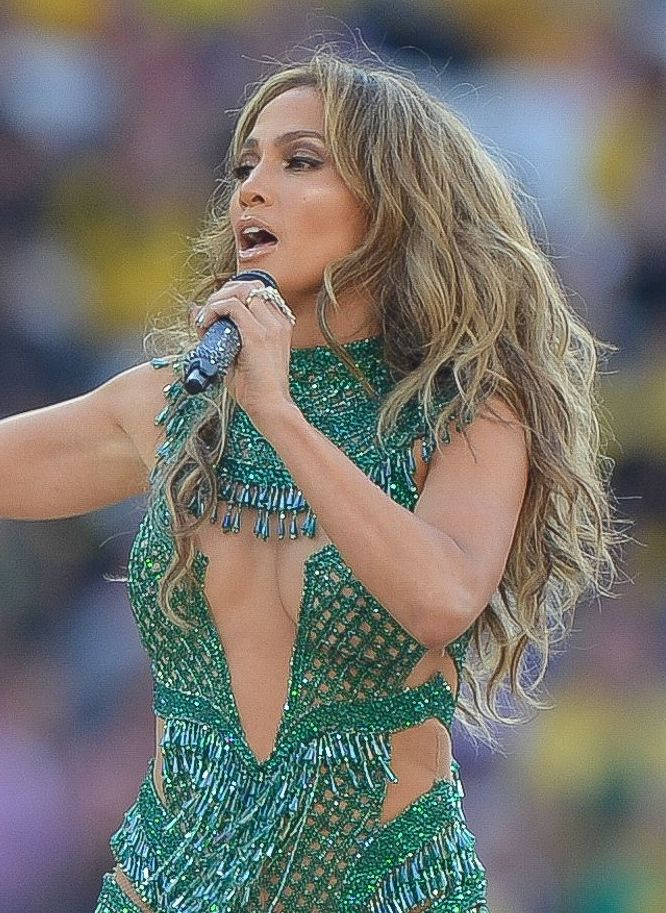
Jennifer Lopez had five singles in the top 10 in 2001, notably reaching number-one in January with "Love Don't Cost a Thing".

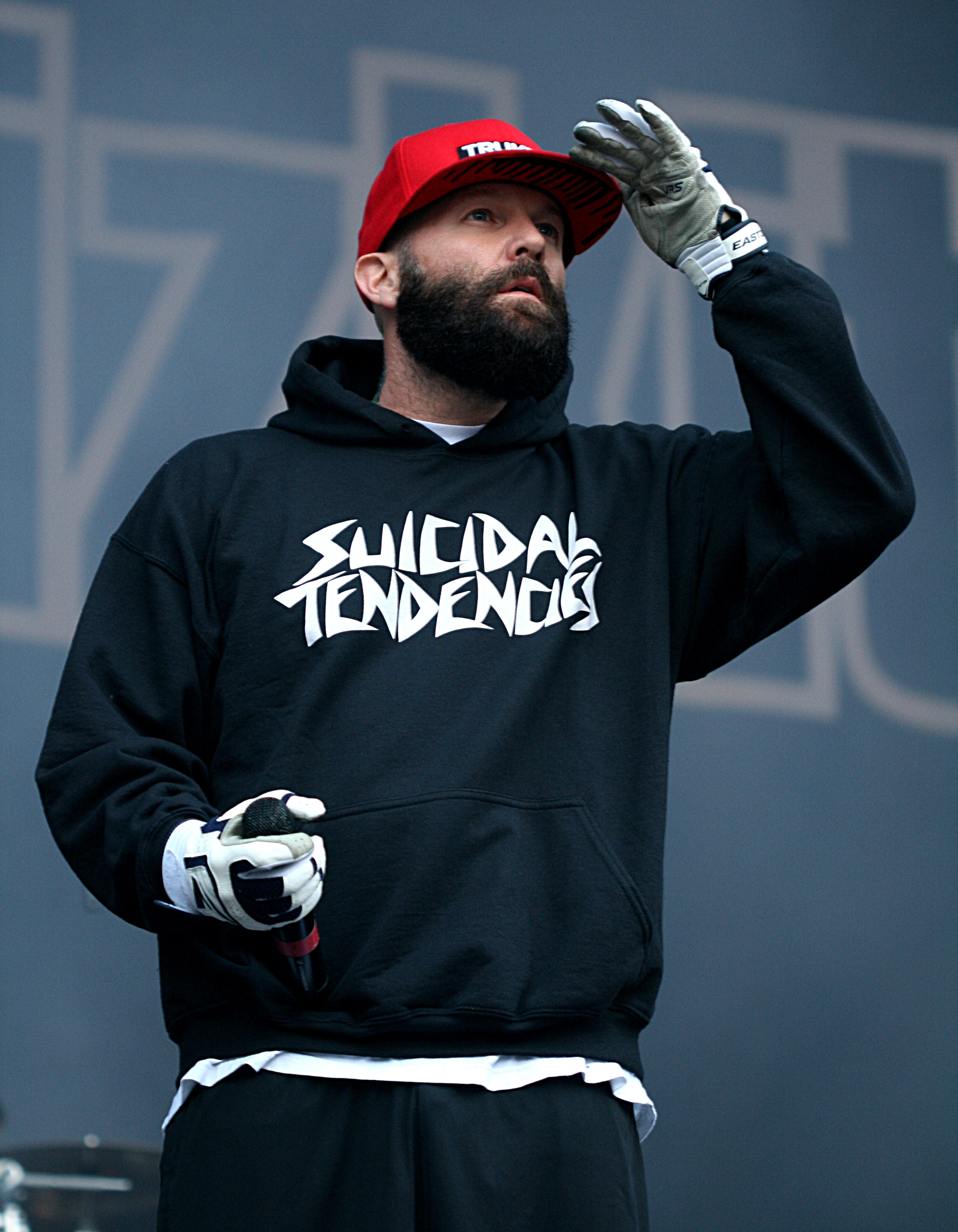
Fred Durst from Limp Bizkit had three top 10 entries in 2001, two of which were with his group. The most successful of his entries was Rollin', which hit number-one in January.

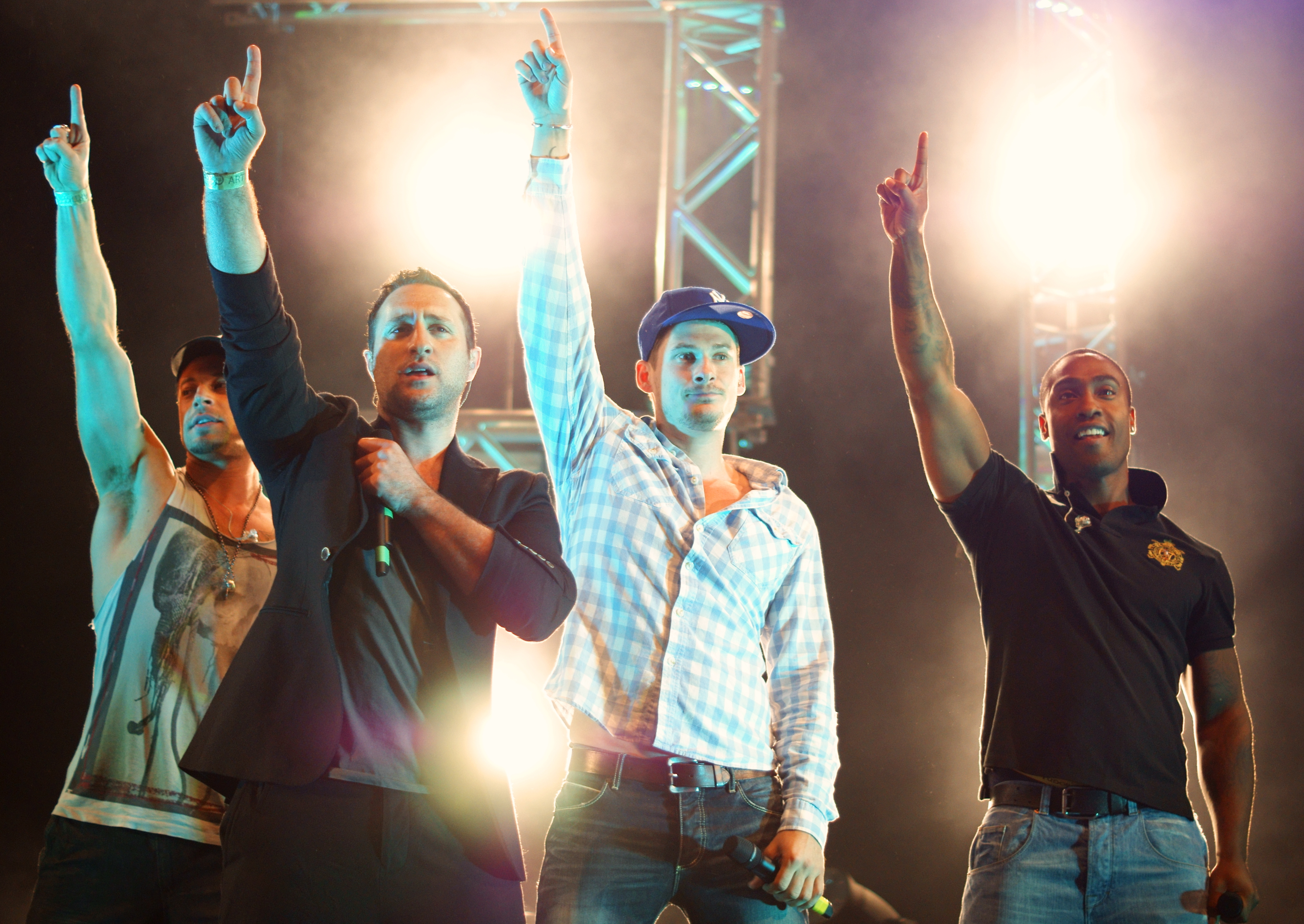
English boy band Blue landed three entries in the top 10 this year, including the number-ones "Too Close" and "If You Come Back".

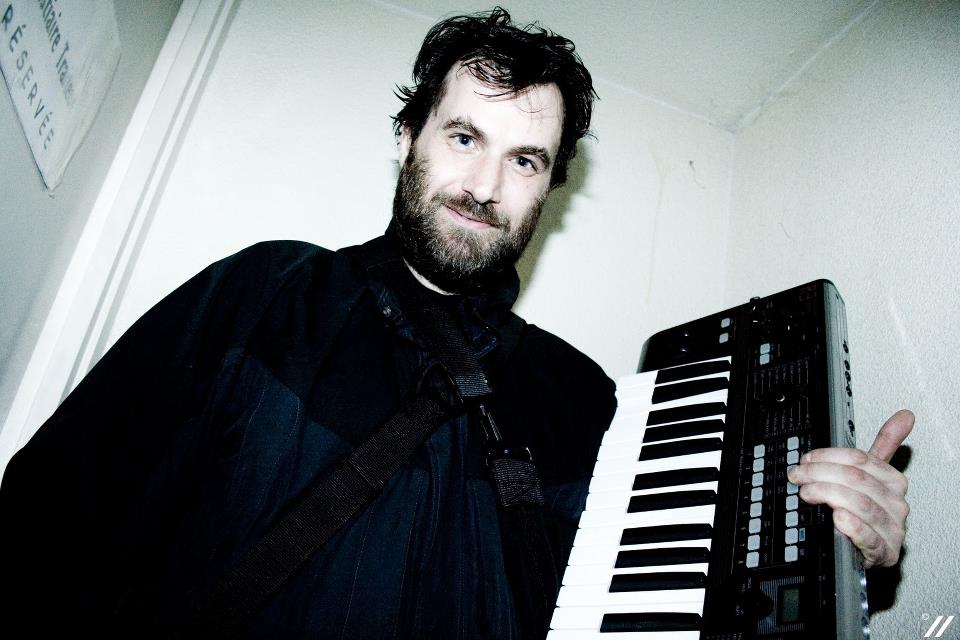
French composer and electronic music producer The Supermen Lovers reached number two in the UK in September 2001 with his single "Starlight", which featured vocals from singer Mani Hoffman.

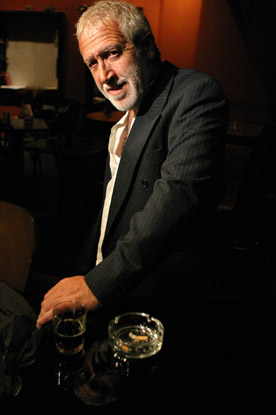
English singer-songwriter Gordon Haskell, who had been an active musician since the 1960s, became a one-hit wonder in the UK Singles Chart in December of this year with his song "How Wonderful You Are", which peaked at number two.

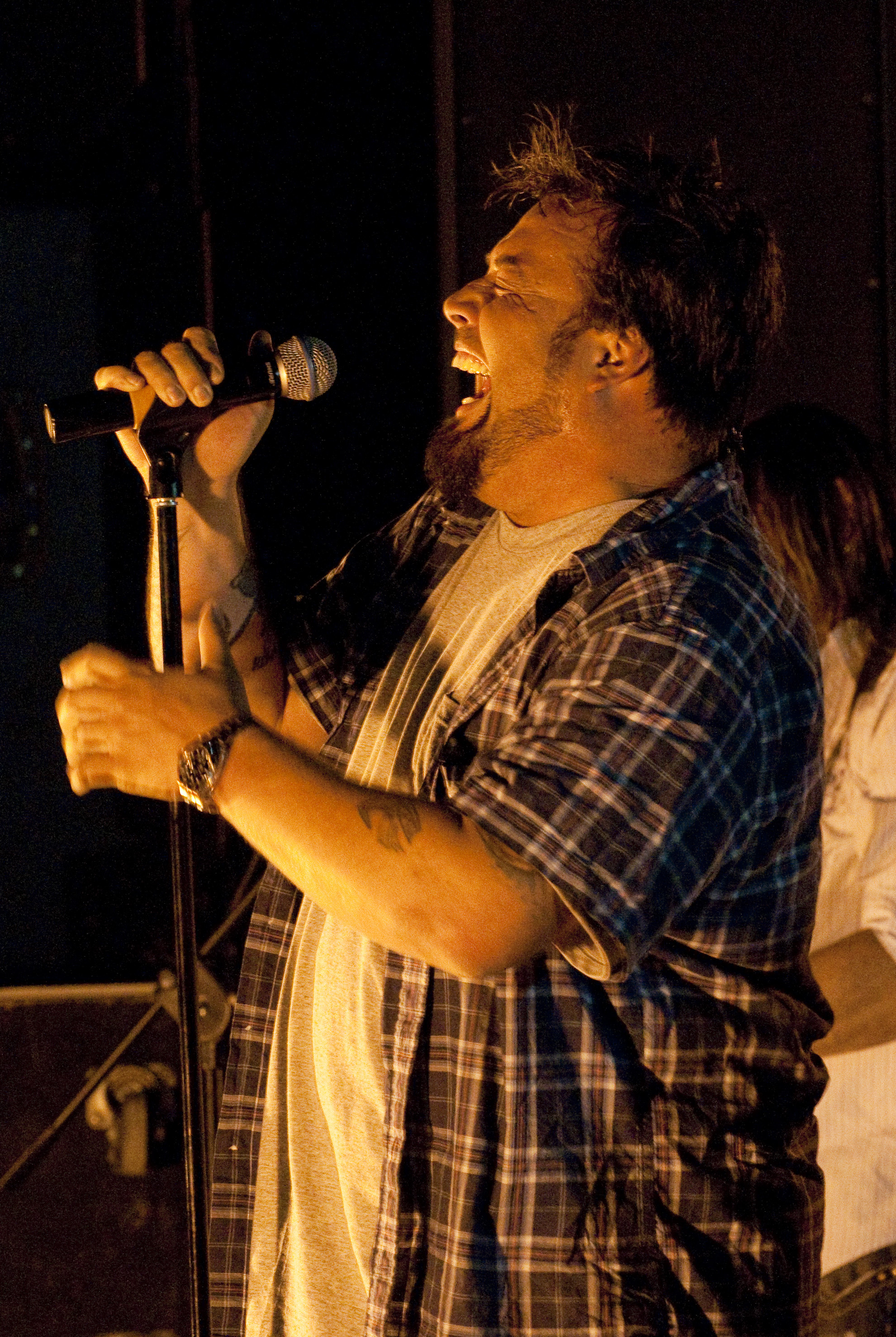
Another one-hit wonder who made the UK charts in 2001 was American county rock singer Uncle Kracker, whose single "Follow Me" peaked at number three and lasted four weeks in the top 10.

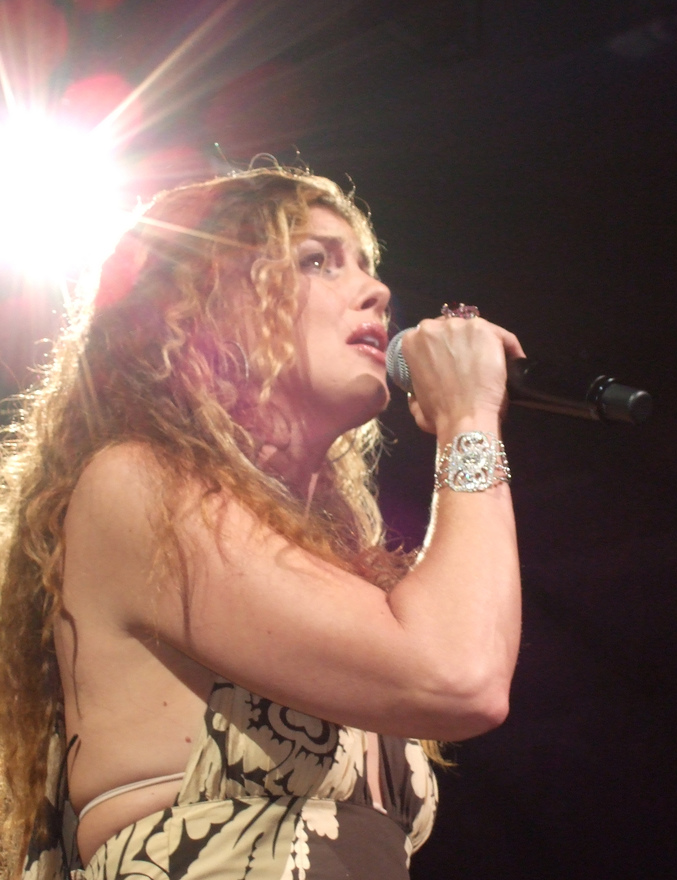
US country singer Faith Hill reached number three in the UK in June of this year with her single "There You'll Be", which featured on the soundtrack of the movie Pearl Harbor.

Entries	Artist	Weeks	Singles
5	Beyoncé Knowles ^{[P]}^{[Q]}^{[R]}	16	"Bootylicious", "Emotion", "Independent Women", "Survivor", "What's Going On"
5	Jennifer Lopez ^{[P]}	10	"Ain't It Funny", "I'm Real", "Love Don't Cost a Thing", "Play" "What's Going On"
5	Kelly Rowland ^{[P]}^{[Q]}^{[R]}	16	"Bootylicious", "Emotion", "Independent Women", "Survivor", "What's Going On"
5	Michelle Williams ^{[P]}^{[Q]}^{[R]}	16	"Bootylicious", "Emotion", "Independent Women", "Survivor", "What's Going On"
4	Bono ^{[P]}^{[S]}	4	"Elevation", "Stuck in a Moment You Can't Get Out Of", "Walk On", "What's Going On"
4	Destiny's Child ^{[Q]}	15	"Bootylicious", "Emotion", "Independent Women", "Survivor"
4	The Edge ^{[P]}^{[S]}	4	"Elevation", "Stuck in a Moment You Can't Get Out Of", "Walk On", "What's Going On"
4	Steps	9	"Chain Reaction"/"One for Sorrow", "Here and Now"/"You'll Be Sorry", "It's the Way You Make Me Feel", "Words Are Not Enough"/"I Know Him So Well"
4	Usher ^{[P]}	6	"Pop Ya Collar, "U Got It Bad", "U Remind Me", "What's Going On"
3	Atomic Kitten	17	"Eternal Flame", "Whole Again", "You Are"
3	Blue	11	"All Rise", "If You Come Back", "Too Close"
3	Britney Spears ^{[P]}^{[Q]}	5	"I'm a Slave 4 U", "Stronger", "What's Going On"
3	Christina Aguilera ^{[P]}	9	"Lady Marmalade", "Nobody Wants to Be Lonely", "What's Going On"
3	Dido ^{[Q]}^{[T]}	11	"Here with Me", "Stan", "Thank You"
3	Eve ^{[P]}	6	"Let Me Blow Ya Mind", "Who's That Girl", "What's Going On"
3	Geri Halliwell	7	"Calling", "It's Raining Men", "Scream If You Wanna Go Faster"
3	Hear'Say	8	"Everybody", "Pure and Simple", "The Way to Your Love"
3	Fred Durst ^{[P]}^{[U]}	8	"My Way", "Rollin'", "What's Going On"
3	Lisa Maffia ^{[Q]}^{[V]}^{[W]}	10	"21 Seconds", "No Good 4 Me", "They Don't Know"
3	Missy Elliott ^{[P]}	5	"Get Ur Freak On", "One Minute Man", "What's Going On"
3	Mis-Teeq	9	"All I Want", "One Night Stand", "Why?"
3	Samantha Mumba	9	"Always Come Back To Your Love", "Baby, Come Over (This Is Our Night)", "Lately"
3	MC Romeo ^{[Q]}^{[V]}^{[W]}	10	"21 Seconds", "No Good 4 Me", "They Don't Know"
3	Nelly Furtado ^{[P]}	8	"I'm Like a Bird", "Turn Off the Light", "What's Going On"
3	Robbie Williams	10	Eternity"/"The Road to Mandalay, "Let Love Be Your Energy", "Somethin' Stupid"
3	S Club 7 ^{[Q]}	22	"Don't Stop Movin'", "Have You Ever", "Never Had a Dream Come True"
3	Shaggy	19	"Angel", "It Wasn't Me" "Luv Me, Luv Me"
3	Stereophonics	9	"Handbags and Gladrags", "Have a Nice Day", "Mr. Writer"
3	U2	4	"Elevation", "Stuck in a Moment You Can't Get Out Of", "Walk On"
3	Westlife ^{[Q]}	13	"Queen of My Heart", "Uptown Girl", "What Makes a Man"
2	Adrienne Bailon ^{[X]}	3	"No More (Baby I'ma Do Right)", "What's Going On"
2	Alicia Keys ^{[P]}	5	"Fallin'", "What's Going On"
2	AJ McLean ^{[P]}^{[Y]}	2	"The Call", "What's Going On"
2	Basement Jaxx	2	"Romeo", "Where's Your Head At"
2	BBMak	2	"Back Here", "Still on Your Side"
2	Bob the Builder ^{[Q]}	8	"Can We Fix It?", "Mambo No. 5"
2	Brian Littrell ^{[P]}^{[Y]}	2	"The Call", "What's Going On"
2	Chris Kirkpatrick ^{[P]}^{[Z]}	2	"Pop", "What's Going On"
2	D12	5	"Purple Pills", "Shit on You"
2	Dane Bowers	2	"Another Lover", "Shut Up and Forget About It"
2	DJ Ötzi	11	"Do Wah Diddy", "Hey Baby (Uhh, Ahh)"
2	Emma Bunton	4	"Take My Breath Away", "What Took You So Long?"
2	Five	7	"Closer to Me"/"Rock the Party", "Let's Dance"
2	Fragma	7	"Everytime You Need Me", "You Are Alive"
2	Gabrielle	7	"Don't Need the Sun to Shine (To Make Me Smile)", "Out of Reach"
2	Gorillaz	10	"19/2000", "Clint Eastwood"
2	Gwen Stefani ^{[P]}^{[AA]}	2	"Let Me Blow Ya Mind", "What's Going On"
2	Howie D ^{[P]}^{[Y]}	2	"The Call", "What's Going On"
2	Ian Van Dahl	9	"Castles in the Sky", "Will I?"
2	JC Chasez ^{[P]}^{[Z]}	2	"Pop", "What's Going On"
2	Joey Fatone ^{[P]}^{[Z]}	2	"Pop", "What's Going On"
2	Justin Timberlake ^{[P]}^{[Z]}	2	"Pop", "What's Going On"
2	Kevin Richardson ^{[P]}^{[Y]}	2	"The Call", "What's Going On"
2	Kiely Williams ^{[X]}	3	"No More (Baby I'ma Do Right)", "What's Going On"
2	Lance Bass ^{[P]}^{[Z]}	2	"Pop", "What's Going On"
2	Lil' Kim ^{[P]}	7	"Lady Maramalade", "What's Going On"
2	Limp Bizkit	7	"My Way", "Rollin'"
2	Manic Street Preachers	2	"Found That Soul", "So Why So Sad"
2	Mary J. Blige ^{[P]}	4	"Family Affair", "What's Going On"
2	Michael Stipe ^{[P]}^{[BB]}	2	"Imitation of Life", "What's Going On"
2	M.O.P.	5	"Ante Up", "Cold as Ice"
2	Mýa	8	"Case of the Ex", "Lady Marmalade"
2	Naturi Naughton ^{[X]}	3	"No More (Baby I'ma Do Right)", "What's Going On"
2	Nelly ^{[P]}	5	"Ride wit Me", "What's Going On"
2	Nick Carter ^{[P]}^{[Y]}	2	"The Call", "What's Going On"
2	O-Town	4	"All or Nothing", "Liquid Dreams"
2	Oxide & Neutrino ^{[Q]}	3	"No Good 4 Me", "Up Middle Finger"
2	Pink	7	"Lady Marmalade", "You Make Me Sick"
2	Snoop Dogg	3	"Bow Wow (That's My Name)", "The Next Episode"
2	So Solid Crew	7	"21 Seconds", "They Don't Know"
2	Sophie Ellis-Bextor	7	"Take Me Home", "Murder on the Dancefloor"
2	Wheatus	12	"A Little Respect", "Teenage Dirtbag"
2	Wyclef Jean ^{[P]}	8	"Perfect Gentleman", "What's Going On"

== Notes ==
- ^{a} "Operation Blade" re-entered the top 10 at number 10 on 6 January 2001 (week ending).
- ^{b} Released as the official single for Children in Need in 2000.
- ^{c} Bob the Builder is voiced by Neil Morrissey.
- ^{d} "Stronger" re-entered the top 10 at number 10 on 6 January 2001 (week ending).
- ^{e} "Dancing in the Moonlight" originally reached number 19 in February 2000. It was re-released in November 2000.
- ^{f} Released as the official single for Comic Relief.
- ^{g} "Don't Stop Movin'" had two separate single-weeks at number one, on 5 May 2001 and 26 May 2001 (week ending).
- ^{h} "Hide U" was first released in 2000 in double A-side with "Empty Skies", charting at number 73.
- ^{i} The original version of "Set You Free" was released in 1995 and peaked at number two.
- ^{j} "Luv Me, Luv Me" failed to chart upon its original release in 1998. Samantha Cole featured on the re-release in place of Janet Jackson.
- ^{k} "Bohemian Like You" charted at number 42 in 2000 and was re-released in 2001.
- ^{l} Released as a charity single to benefit AIDS programs.
- ^{m} Released as the official single for Children in Need.
- ^{n} "Gotta Get Thru This" spent two weeks at number one in 2001. It returned to the top of the charts on 12 January 2002 (week ending).
- ^{o} "What If" re-entered the top 10 at number 10 on 5 January 2002 (week ending) for two weeks.
- ^{p} Figure includes an appearance on the charity single "What's Going On" as part of Artists Against AIDS Worldwide.
- ^{q} Figure includes song that peaked in 2000.
- ^{r} Figure includes four top 10 hits with the group Destiny's Child.
- ^{s} Figure includes two top 10 hits with the group U2.
- ^{t} Figure includes appearance on Eminem's "Stan".
- ^{u} Figure includes two top 10 hits with the group Limp Bizkit.
- ^{v} Figure includes two top 10 hits with the group So Solid Crew.
- ^{w} Figure includes appearance on Oxide & Neutrino's "No Good 4 Me".
- ^{x} Figure includes a top 10 hit with the group 3LW.
- ^{y} Figure includes a top 10 hit with the group Backstreet Boys.
- ^{z} Figure includes a top 10 hit with the group NSYNC.
- ^{aa} Figure includes appearance on Eve's "Let Me Blow Ya Mind".
- ^{bb} Figure includes one top 10 hit with the group R.E.M.

== See also ==
- 2001 in British music
- List of number-one singles from the 2000s (UK)
