= List of UK Dance Singles Chart number ones of 2001 =

These are The Official UK Charts Company UK Official Dance Chart number one hits of 2001. The dates listed in the menus below represent the Saturday after the Sunday the chart was announced, as per the way the dates are given in chart publications such as the ones produced by Billboard, Guinness, and Virgin.

Issue date	Song	Artist
6 January	"Coming Home"	K-Warren featuring Lee-O
13 January	"Komodo (Save a Soul)"	Mauro Picotto
20 January	"Camels"	Santos
27 January	"Camels"	Santos
3 February	"Boom Selection"	Genius Cru
10 February	"Boom Selection"	Genius Cru
17 February	"Synaesthesia (Fly Away)"	The Thrillseekers featuring Sheryl Deane
24 February	"American Dream"	Jakatta
3 March	"American Dream"	Jakatta
10 March	"The Vision"	Mario Più presents DJ Arabesque
17 March	"Piano Loco"	DJ Luck & MC Neat
24 March	"Dirty Beats"	Roni Size/Reprazent
31 March	"Joy"	Mark Ryder
7 April	"Salsoul Nugget (If U Wanna)"	M&S presents The Girl Next Door
14 April	"Happiness"	Sound De-Zign
21 April	"How You Like Bass"	Norman Bass
28 April	"Get Ur Freak On"	Missy Elliott
5 May	"Love Is Not a Game"	J Majik featuring Kathy Brown
12 May	"Back Up (To Me)"	Wookie featuring Lain
19 May	"Secrets"	Mutiny UK
26 May	"Up Middle Finger"	Oxide & Neutrino
2 June ^{[a]}	"Do You Really Like It?"	DJ Pied Piper and the Masters of Ceremonies
9 June	"Just Can't Get Enough (No No No No)"	Eye to Eye featuring Taka Boom
16 June	"Romeo"	Basement Jaxx
23 June	"Booo!"	Sticky featuring Ms. Dynamite
30 June	"Obsession" / "Tear Out Me Heart"	Future Cut
7 July	"Up All Night" / "Take Control"	John B
14 July ^{[a]}	"Another Chance"	Roger Sanchez
21 July	"Castles in the Sky"	Ian Van Dahl
28 July	"Meet Her at the Love Parade 2001"	Da Hool
4 August	"Witness (1 Hope)"	Roots Manuva
11 August	"Babarabatiri"	Gypsymen
18 August ^{[a]}	"21 Seconds"	So Solid Crew
25 August	"Superstylin'"	Groove Armada
1 September	"Hide U"	Kosheen
8 September	"21st Century"	Weekend Players
15 September	"Body Rock"	Shimon & Andy C
22 September	"It Began in Afrika"	The Chemical Brothers
29 September	"Papua New Guinea 2001"	Future Sound Of London
6 October	"Right On!"	Silicone Soul
13 October	"Jus 1 Kiss"	Basement Jaxx
20 October	"Flawless"	The Ones
27 October	"Sambuca"	Wideboys featuring Dennis G
3 November	"Sambuca"	Wideboys featuring Dennis G
10 November	"Rapture"	iiO
17 November	"They Don't Know"	So Solid Crew
24 November	"They Don't Know"	So Solid Crew
1 December	"Thunderball" / "Lazy Bones"	Moving Fusion
8 December ^{[a]}	"Gotta Get Thru This"	Daniel Bedingfield
15 December	"Gotta Get Thru This"	Daniel Bedingfield
22 December	"Gotta Get Thru This"	Daniel Bedingfield
29 December	"Gotta Get Thru This"	Daniel Bedingfield

- ^{a} – the single was simultaneously number-one on the singles chart.

== See also ==
- 2001 in music
