= Stuntmasters =

Stuntmasters may refer to:

- Stuntmasters, a 1991 TV series
- Stuntmasterz, a British DJ group
- Jackie Chan Stuntmaster, a 2000 videogame
