= The Cock =

Gay bar in Manhattan, New York

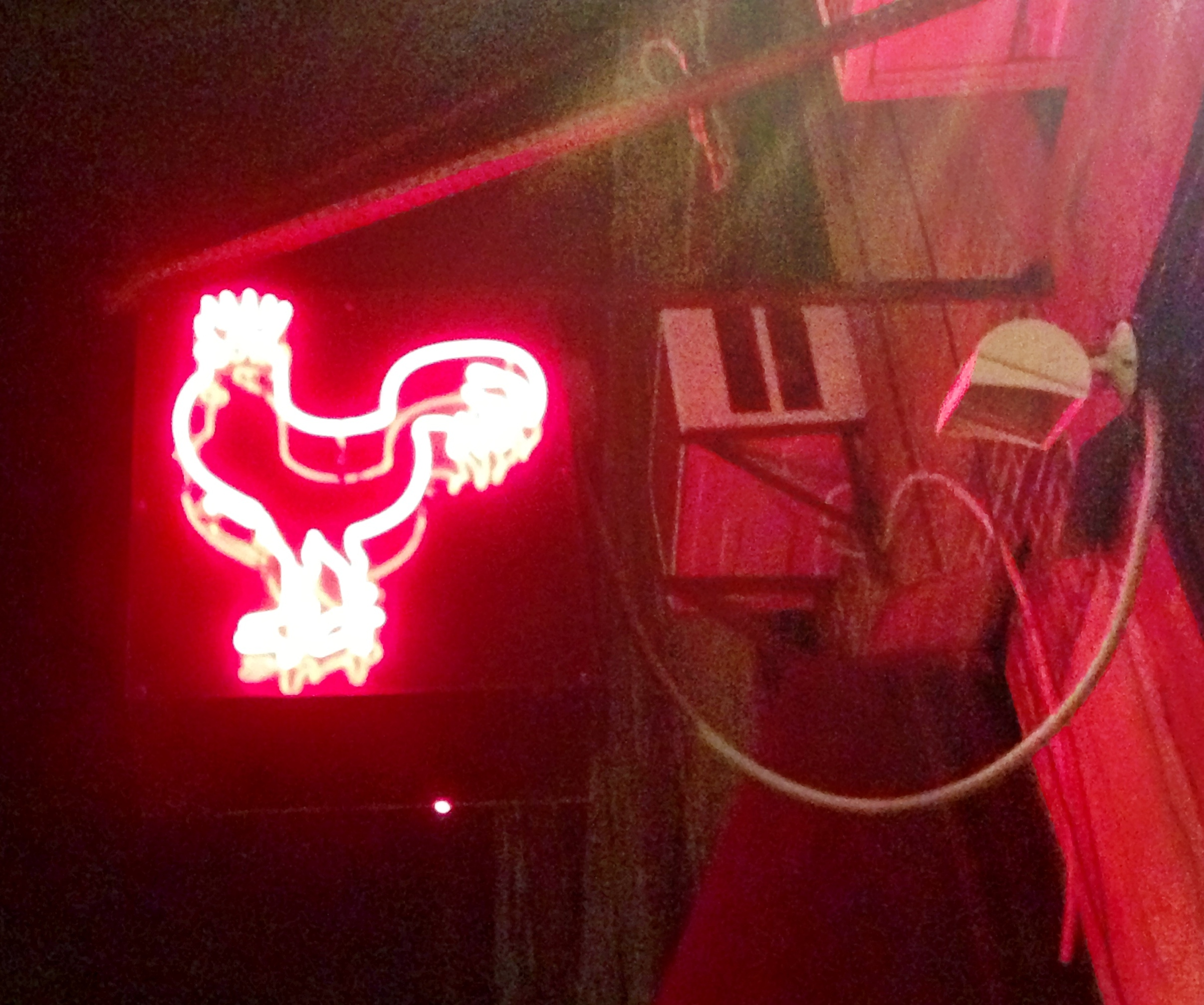
- Entrance to The Cock, bearing the bar's logo
- Interactive map of The Cock
- Address: 93 Second Avenue
- Location: East Village, Manhattan, New York, US
- Coordinates: 40°43′37.8″N 73°59′20.3″W
- Owner: Allan Mannarelli
- Type: Gay bar; dive bar
- Public transit: Astor Place station; Second Avenue station

Construction
- Opened: 1998

The Cock is a gay dive bar in the East Village neighborhood of Manhattan in New York, New York, United States. It is noted for its exhibitionist atmosphere and popularity as a cruising destination. Opened in 1998, the venue has been described by them. magazine as "a rarified taste of old New York and the cruisy gay scene that existed [there] in the '80s and '90s". In the late 1990s and early 2000s, it experienced frequent police raids under Mayor Rudy Giuliani's anti-nightlife crackdowns. The Cock has relocated twice, and its 2015 move along Second Avenue was met with opposition by nearby residents and Manhattan Community Board 3. Two other attempted moves, in 2014 and 2021, were blocked by the community board. Critics characterize the bar as "filthy", "seductive", and "alluring", noting that it is an unusual find in the United States and bears resemblance to European red-light district establishments.

== Description ==
The Cock is one of a few remaining cruising spaces in New York City, and photography is prohibited inside. The interior consists of two levels, with the basement serving as a dark room. New York magazine describes the venue as having "a rollicking backroom sex scene", while the main room features theme parties, go-go dancers and DJs. The bar's street presence is minimal, marked only by a neon sign of a rooster. It is owned by Allan Mannarelli, a straight proprietor who also operates Albion, a bar in Kips Bay, and who used to manage Superdive, a now-closed establishment in the East Village.

== History ==
=== Background and early years ===
The Cock opened in 1998 and was originally on Avenue A in Manhattan. Since then, it has relocated twice: first to 29 Second Avenue and then slightly northward to 93 Second Avenue. In its early years, the venue hosted exhibitionist shows organized by promoter Mario Diaz. According to New York magazine, "[the] sordid acts and general carefree air ... [attracted] not only horny young men but also plenty of spectacle-seeking celebrities," including Christina Aguilera, Boy George and George Michael. The bar was raided frequently during Rudy Giuliani's tenure as mayor of New York City. That "anti-nightlife" era saw "cops and inspectors ... swarming the Cock as often as twice a week, ticketing for anything they could find". The venue was temporarily shuttered in 2000 for being a public nuisance. After the business reopened, it ran into legal trouble when patrons continued to smoke indoors after the 2003 statewide smoking ban, but its only formal citation was dismissed.

=== 2010s ===
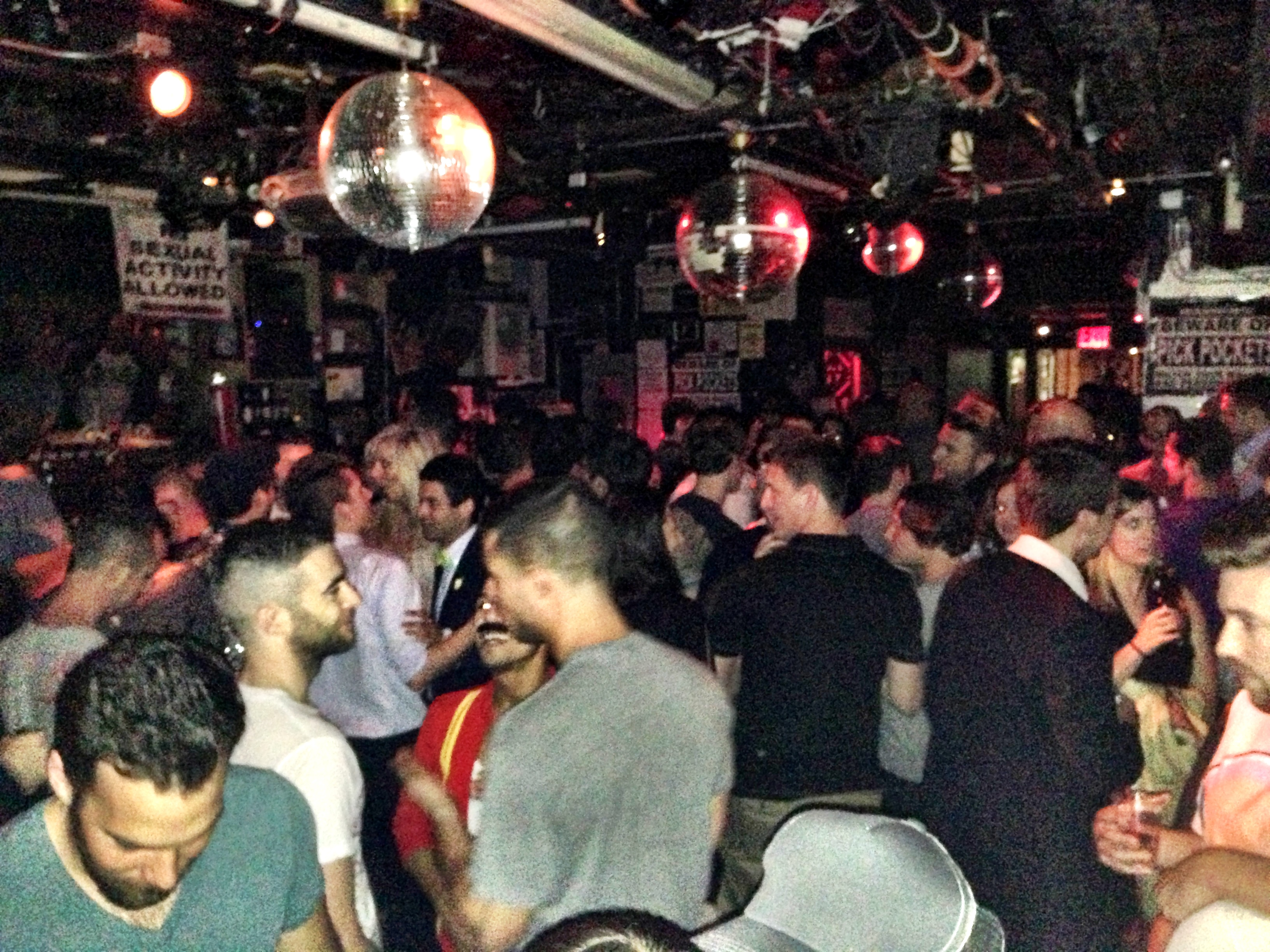
Interior of The Cock, 2013

Mannarelli attempted to move The Cock from 29 Second Avenue to Avenue B in 2014, but Manhattan Community Board 3 rejected his application after learning that the venue would offer "drag shows, 'art performances', and meat pies". The following year, the bar successfully relocated up Second Avenue, into a space formerly occupied by Lit Lounge. This move was met with resistance by the East Fifth Street Block Association, which opposed new venues in the nightlife-saturated neighborhood, and the community board, which attempted to block the bar's liquor license. Displeased residents of nearby dwellings organized a "Block the Cock" campaign.

Throughout the 2010s, The Cock was managed by Nashom Wooden, a fixture of the New York City nightlife scene who performed in drag as Mona Foot and was a member of the Ones. Wooden also worked there as a bartender. During the same period, pornographic actor Boomer Banks began his career as a go-go dancer at the bar.

=== 2020s ===
In January 2020, there was a reported slashing outside The Cock's entrance. Police responding to the incident entered the premises, and they issued summonses for sexual exposure by the venue's go-go dancers. The following month, Mannarelli attempted to change The Cock's liquor license to that of "a nightclub with live music and dancing". The state liquor authority (SLA) denied this request, but Community Board 3 approved it. This caused the SLA to admonish the community board and warn it that it would be held responsible for any future problems at The Cock.

Like other New York City nightlife venues, The Cock shut down temporarily during the COVID-19 pandemic. Ahead of its reopening, Mannarelli applied to transfer the establishment to an address on Rivington Street. This was met with protest by area residents, and Community Board 3 struck down the request. Mannarelli resolved to reopen the 93 Second Avenue location during New York City's 2021 Pride week, at which time it was announced that the bar would require proof of vaccination against COVID-19 for entry. A May 2021 Queerty article indicated that, later in the year, Mannarelli intended to "spruce up an unused space [inside that location] and open it as the Celebration Room" in honor of Wooden, who died of a suspected case of COVID-19 in March 2020.

== Reception ==
In the midst of all this corporate sterility, The Cock stands out like a precarious red light in a city without a red light district.... It is a distinctly European-feeling space.

— Alexander Cheves, them. magazine

The Cock's reputation with patrons and critics is one of a raunchy, uninhibited space; some comment that it contrasts with the "corporate sterility" of New York and that similar venues are not common in the United States. Of the bar's current location, New York magazine said: "Despite the new space, [the bar] retains its penchant for irony-laced depravity." Alexander Cheves of them. magazine called The Cock "the last filthy gay bar in New York", and he stated, "[T]here is—alarmingly—no other bar like it in the city and very few bars like it left in the country."

ShermansTravel places The Cock among "the best gay and queer bars in Manhattan", branding it "the most cruise-y of all the gay bars in the city". In a list titled "The Absolute Best Gay Bar[s] in Manhattan", Mike Albo of GrubStreet.com ranked The Cock second with the following remark: "Rough-edged, covered in band stickers, and carved with little weird nooks and dark corners, this place is like a filthy, seductive, alluring alleyway." Time Out magazine, which placed the bar 14th on its 2022 compilation of "the 24 best gay bars in NYC", wrote that the venue "is just the sort of dark, sketchy dive where you can unleash your inner sexy beast. The dearth of uptown attitude (or any apparent concern for cleanliness) pulls artists, musicians, writers, fashionistos [sic], tourists and closeted rebels, all of whom can appreciate a little dirty fun." Politico called The Cock "the neighborhoods [sic] most notorious gay bar".

== See also ==
- LGBTQ culture in New York City
- LGBTQ history in New York
- List of dive bars
