= Lit Lounge =

Former nightclub in New York City

- Interactive map of Lit Lounge
- Address: 93 2nd Avenue
- Location: East Village, Manhattan, New York, US
- Coordinates: 40°43′37.8″N 73°59′20.3″W
- Owner: Erik Foss & David Schwartz
- Type: Nightclub
- Public transit: Astor Place; Second Avenue

Construction
- Opened: February 22, 2002
- Closed: July 30, 2015

Lit Lounge was a nightclub in the East Village neighborhood of Manhattan in New York City. The two-floor complex housed a concert venue, lounge, dance floor, and Fuse Gallery, an art exhibition space. Lit Lounge was noted as a major venue for New York City's hipster subculture in the mid- to late 2000s, particularly the indie rock and electroclash scene of the era.

== History ==
Lit Lounge was owned by Erik Foss and David Schwartz, who worked at East Village and Bowery-area bars throughout the 1990s. Lit opened on February 22, 2002, while Fuse Gallery opened on March 16, 2002, with an exhibition of works by H.R. Giger. Lit quickly became a major venue for New York's hipster subculture, particularly the indie rock and electroclash scene of the era. It was among the first New York clubs to embrace European DJs in the mashup genre such as Soulwax and Erol Alkan, along with post-hardcore artists such as Sergio Vega of Quicksand. Lit declined in popularity after The Beatrice Inn converted into a nightclub in 2006, though enjoyed a resurgence after Beatrice was shut down in 2009.

In 2010, the bar was the subject of protests during a request for a license transfer for a new venture, in which local residents claimed Lit frequently played music past 4 a.m. on weekends and contributed to crowding on sidewalks. Lit withdrew their transfer request in response, and committed to hiring additional security and installing additional soundproofing material.

Fuse Gallery closed on August 6, 2013, citing financial difficulties. On July 8, 2015, Foss and Schwartz announced that Lit Lounge would close "within the next two months." Rising rents and the changing social scene of the East Village were cited as primary reasons for the closure, with the majority of Lit Lounge's clients having migrated to the Brooklyn neighborhoods of Bushwick, Greenpoint, and Williamsburg. Lit Lounge abruptly closed on July 30, 2015, following an incident in which a 34-year-old teacher at Léman Manhattan Preparatory School was alleged to have had sex with a 16-year-old student in the bathroom at Lit Lounge. In December 2015, the gay bar The Cock moved into the space at 93 Second Avenue formerly occupied by Lit Lounge.

Foss and Schwartz announced plans to reopen Lit Lounge at a location in the McKibbin Street Lofts in East Williamsburg, Brooklyn, which was at the time occupied by the Currant Cafe, a restaurant they opened in March 2014. The venue opened as a nightclub under the name Tilt in December 2016, which closed in February 2019.

== Reception and legacy ==
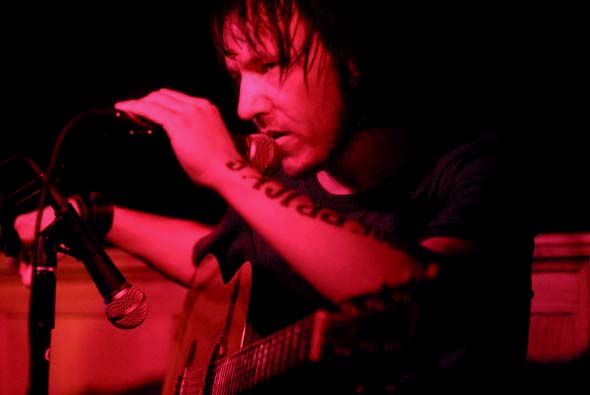
One of Elliott Smith's final live performances in New York at Lit Lounge, January 2003

AM New York Metro described Lit Lounge as "the nexus of cool people and indie bands in the early-mid 2000s." The club attracted numerous celebrities as patrons, including Chloë Sevigny, Kirsten Dunst, and The Strokes. Notable artists who performed or exhibited at Lit include actors Mike Myers and Leo Fitzpatrick; photographers Ryan McGinley and Mick Rock; filmmaker Spike Jonze; and musicians Karen O, Nick Zinner, David Yow, and James Iha. Writer Cat Marnell, a regular at Lit Lounge, described the club as "such a piece-of-shit place in the best way possible" and "like Cheers ... but with PCP and vodka." Several music videos were filmed at Lit, including "Rich Girls" by The Virgins and "Boy Boy" by Lissy Trullie.
