= List of UK singles chart Christmas number twos =

The UK singles chart is known for the race for the top slot on the chart immediately prior to Christmas. The first place winner is known as the Christmas Number One. The UK public take a particular interest in chart performance and sales of singles are especially high in the two weeks before Christmas. The race for first position at Christmas has become a British institution and people will speculate, comment and bet upon the outcome.

The following is a list of UK Singles Chart Christmas number twos, songs that came in second place on the chart.

== Background ==
“Christmas Number 2, isn’t that bonkers? When we wrote this song, in the blazing month of August, we didn’t even expect it to chart. But here we are, in a Mariah Carey and WHAM! sandwich, and we’re the filling. I’m stoked! I hope this has given some vigour and some fire to upcoming grass roots and indie artists. You can do it – you’ve just got to set your heart ablaze and get out there. Believe, have faith.

— Sam Ryder, 2023 Christmas number two, to the Official Charts Company

The Christmas number one is a highly coveted prize in the United Kingdom, so much so that a coattail or slipstream effect occurs with all of the competing songs earning publicity, regardless of whether or not they succeed. On PRS for Music's 2010 list of the most popular Christmas songs of the year, the top three songs were all songs that had finished second on the chart: 1987's "Fairytale of New York" by The Pogues and Kirsty MacColl (beaten by the Pet Shop Boys' cover of "Always on My Mind"), 1984's "Last Christmas" by Wham! (second to Band Aid's "Do They Know It's Christmas?," which also appears on the top-10 of the PRS chart; "Last Christmas" would finish number two again in 2022, and finally reached Christmas number one in 2023), and 1994's "All I Want for Christmas Is You", now considered a Christmas standard both in the UK and in performer Mariah Carey's native United States but one that lost the Christmas number-one to East 17's "Stay Another Day" (and would re-enter the charts in 2020, peaking second again, this time to LadBaby). In some cases, the Christmas number-one is a novelty song that has little shelf life after the Christmas season, whereas the number-two has a greater life in recurrent rotation. An example of this was 1980's "There's No One Quite Like Grandma" by St Winifred's School Choir, a song that forced "(Just Like) Starting Over" by the recently deceased John Lennon out of the number-one spot (Lennon returned to number-one the week after Christmas).

The only group to have both Christmas numbers one and two in the same year is The Beatles, a feat they achieved twice, in 1963 and 1967. George Michael, Ed Sheeran (twice) and Elton John have appeared first and second on the same chart as part of different acts—Michael with Band Aid and Wham! in 1984, Sheeran as a solo artist and as a featured artist with Eminem in 2017, and Sheeran and John as a duo and as featured artists with LadBaby in 2021. The 2021 appearance by Sheeran and John was also the only time any artist(s) have appeared first and second with different versions of essentially the same song, scoring second with "Merry Christmas" and first with its parody, "Sausage Rolls for Everyone." Cliff Richard has finished second on the Christmas charts four times, the most of any act. The highest selling Christmas number-two is "Last Christmas" by Wham! (which is also the only time a record has finished first and second in separate years) followed by "She Loves You" by The Beatles.

Another factor in the greater interest in the Christmas number two is the growing influence of reality television programmes on the chart. Popstars: The Rivals (2002) produced all of the top three singles on the Christmas UK Singles Chart. The Choir produced the number-one single in 2011 and, indirectly, 2015. The most sustained reality-orientated run at the top of the Christmas charts was The X Factor, whose winner charted number one or number two on the chart every year from the second series from 2005 to 2014. Bookmakers began to notice the X Factor trends in 2007, when, assuming the X Factor single would be a certainty for the number one, they started taking bets on who Christmas number two would be instead. The X Factor's dominance has also led to numerous novelty campaigns to attempt to prevent the show's winner from reaching the top of the chart, although only "Killing in the Name" by Rage Against the Machine was successful in 2009. Charity records have pushed the X-Factor winners down to number-two in 2011 and 2012, while in 2013 and 2014 the X-Factor winners pushed two records that would eventually sell over a million copies down to number two. The X Factor winning single plummeted dramatically in popularity beginning with the 2015 single ("Forever Young" by Louisa Johnson), the sales for which fell over 80% year-over-year, until it was cancelled in 2021. In the early 2020s, changes to the chart compilation led to a wave of older records that were previously hits returning to the upper reaches of the charts, which first became evident with "Last Christmas" reaching number two in 2022 and eventually number one in the two following years; the BBC commented in 2025 of the "grim inevitability" that an older record would claim Christmas number one.

== List ==
Tracks marked * topped the chart either in the run-up to, or shortly after, Christmas.

Year	Artist	Song	Notes
1952	Jo Stafford	"You Belong to Me"	*
1953	David Whitfield	"Answer Me"	*
1954	David Whitfield	"Santo Natale"	
1955	Bill Haley & His Comets	"Rock Around the Clock"	*
1956	Guy Mitchell	"Singing the Blues"	*
1957	Johnny Otis and his orchestra with Marie Adams	"Ma He's Making Eyes at Me"	
1958	Lord Rockingham's XI	"Hoots Mon"	*
1959	Adam Faith	"What Do You Want?"	*
1960	Elvis Presley	"It's Now or Never"	*
1961	Frankie Vaughan	"Tower of Strength"	*
1962	Cliff Richard	"The Next Time"/"Bachelor Boy"	*
1963	The Beatles	"She Loves You"	*
1964	Petula Clark	"Downtown"	
1965	Cliff Richard	"Wind Me Up (Let Me Go)"	
1966	The Seekers	"Morningtown Ride"	
1967	The Beatles	Magical Mystery Tour (EP)	
1968	The Foundations	"Build Me Up Buttercup"	
1969	Kenny Rogers and The First Edition	"Ruby, Don't Take Your Love To Town"	
1970	McGuinness Flint	"When I'm Dead and Gone"	
1971	T. Rex	"Jeepster"	
1972	Chuck Berry	"My Ding-a-Ling"	*
1973	Gary Glitter	"I Love You Love Me Love"	*
1974	Bachman–Turner Overdrive	"You Ain't Seen Nothing Yet"	
1975	Greg Lake	"I Believe in Father Christmas"	
1976	Showaddywaddy	"Under the Moon of Love"	*
1977	Brighouse and Rastrick Brass Band	"The Floral Dance"	
1978	The Village People	"Y.M.C.A."	*
1979	ABBA	"I Have a Dream"	
1980	John Lennon	"(Just Like) Starting Over"	*
1981	Cliff Richard	"Daddy's Home"	
1982	Shakin' Stevens	The Shakin' Stevens EP	
1983	Slade	"My Oh My"	
1984	Wham!	"Last Christmas"/"Everything She Wants"	
1985	Whitney Houston	"Saving All My Love for You"	*
1986	The Housemartins	"Caravan of Love"	*
1987	The Pogues ft. Kirsty MacColl	"Fairytale of New York"	
1988	Kylie Minogue ft. Jason Donovan	"Especially for You"	*
1989	Jive Bunny and the Mastermixers	"Let's Party"	*
1990	Vanilla Ice	"Ice Ice Baby"	*
1991	Diana Ross	"When You Tell Me That You Love Me"	
1992	Michael Jackson	"Heal the World"	
1993	Take That	"Babe"	*
1994	Mariah Carey	"All I Want For Christmas Is You"	
1995	The Mike Flowers Pops	"Wonderwall"	
1996	Dunblane	"Knockin' On Heaven's Door"	*
1997	Teletubbies	"Teletubbies say "Eh-oh!""	*
1998	Chef	"Chocolate Salty Balls (P.S. I Love You)"	*
1999	Cliff Richard	"The Millennium Prayer"	*
2000	Westlife	"What Makes a Man"	
2001	Gordon Haskell	"How Wonderful You Are"	
2002	One True Voice	"Sacred Trust"	
2003	The Darkness	"Christmas Time (Don't Let the Bells End)"	
2004	Ronan Keating ft. Yusuf Islam	"Father and Son"	
2005	Nizlopi	"JCB Song"	*
2006	Take That	"Patience"	*
2007	Katie Melua and Eva Cassidy	"What a Wonderful World"	*
2008	Jeff Buckley	"Hallelujah"	
2009	Joe McElderry	"The Climb"	*
2010	Rihanna ft. Drake	"What's My Name?"	*
2011	Little Mix	"Cannonball"	*
2012	James Arthur	"Impossible"	*
2013	Pharrell Williams	"Happy"	*
2014	Mark Ronson ft. Bruno Mars	"Uptown Funk"	*
2015	Justin Bieber	"Love Yourself"	*
2016	Rag'n'Bone Man	"Human"	
2017	Eminem ft. Ed Sheeran	"River"	*
2018	Ava Max	"Sweet but Psycho"	*
2019	Stormzy ft. Ed Sheeran and Burna Boy	"Own It"	*
2020	Mariah Carey	"All I Want for Christmas is You"	*
2021	Ed Sheeran and Elton John	"Merry Christmas"	*
2022	Wham!	"Last Christmas"	*
2023	Sam Ryder	"You're Christmas to Me"	
2024	Gracie Abrams	"That's So True"	*
2025	Wham!	"Last Christmas"	*

== See also ==
- List of UK singles chart Christmas number ones
