= Nashom Wooden =

American performing artist (1969–2020)

- Born: October 9, 1969; Brooklyn, New York City, New York, U.S.
- Died: March 23, 2020 (aged 50); New York City, New York, U.S.
- Other name: Mona Foot
- Occupation: Performing artist

Nashom Benjamin Wooden (October 9, 1969 – March 23, 2020) was an American performing artist. Wooden was a member of the electronic dance music group the Ones and performed as a drag queen under the stage name Mona Foot.

== Biography ==
Wooden was born in October 1969 and raised in Brooklyn, New York, and entered the New York nightlife scene as a Club Kid in the mid-1980s. By 1989, he worked in Manhattan running the men's clothing department at Patricia Field's boutique while developing the drag queen persona Mona Foot with his friend and former roommate Lady Bunny. Wooden credits RuPaul as an early mentor; RuPaul taught Wooden how to apply makeup, and both appeared in an off-Broadway play titled My Pet Homo. As Mona Foot, Wooden hosted the weekly drag competition "Mona Foot's Star Search" at the New York gay bar Barracuda, cited by The New York Times as a likely inspiration for the television series RuPaul's Drag Race.

In 1997, Wooden began to work as a bartender and DJ at The Cock, a gay bar. In 1999, he appeared in drag in the comedy-drama film Flawless. Along with JoJo Americo and Paul Alexander as the music group the Ones, Wooden co-wrote and performed the 2001 song "Flawless", which peaked at No. 4 on the Billboard Dance Club Songs chart, No. 7 in the United Kingdom, and No. 2 in Belgium. Later in his life, Wooden began to perform less frequently as Mona Foot, stating that "it just kind of fizzled out. I stopped taking gigs." Wooden gave his final performance as Mona Foot in 2018, where he revived the character for that year's Wigstock to perform as Wonder Woman.

Wooden was HIV-positive and undetectable. On March 23, 2020, Wooden died at the age of 50 as a result of complications from a suspected case of COVID-19 in New York, in the midst of the COVID-19 pandemic in New York City. He was buried at Green-Wood Cemetery in Brooklyn, New York.

== See also ==
- List of deaths due to COVID-19
