= Erik Foss (artist) =

American artist and curator (born 1973)

- Born: 1973 (age 52–53); Elgin, Illinois, U.S.
- Known for: Painting, co-founding Lit Lounge
- Notable work: Avarice (2011); Everyday Is Halloween (2020); Cobra series (2021–)
- Website: erikfossnyc.com

Erik Foss (born 1973) is an American artist and curator based in New York City. His paintings incorporate autobiographical themes, American iconography, and pop culture, painted with airbrush in neon palettes. He has exhibited at the American Academy of Arts and Letters and Kaikai Kiki Gallery, Tokyo, and his work has been covered in Artforum and The New York Times. In the early 2000s, he co-founded the bar Lit Lounge and its adjoining art gallery, Fuse.

== Early life ==
Foss was born in Elgin, Illinois and raised primarily in Chandler, Arizona, following his parents' separation. He grew up skateboarding in a trailer park. He began drawing in childhood, influenced by cartoons. His father was a toy designer who worked on He-Man figures. Foss has cited an airbrush illustrator he knew as a kid as an early inspiration.

In 1994, Foss witnessed a homicide committed by a police officer. He testified in court and appeared on television about the case; the officer received a life sentence. This event prompted his move to New York City in 1996.

== Career ==
=== Lit Lounge and Fuse Gallery ===
In 2002, Foss co-founded Lit Lounge and Fuse Gallery in Manhattan's East Village. The bar attracted a downtown crowd that included Chloë Sevigny, Harmony Korine, and The Strokes. Over 15 years, he organized more than 180 exhibitions at Fuse Gallery, including a solo show by H. R. Giger, the artist's first in New York in over a decade.

=== Visual art ===
Cruisin the Strip (2021), one of Foss's airbrushed snake paintings

Foss is a self-taught artist who works in painting, sculpture, photography, and installation. Foss has collaborated with Supreme and Deathwish skateboards. During the COVID-19 pandemic, he launched his "Cobra" series through Instagram Live sessions.

In 2010, Foss exhibited at Perry Rubenstein Gallery in New York as part of "Shred," a group show reviewed by The New York Times. In 2012 and 2020, Foss was selected for the American Academy of Arts and Letters' Invitational Exhibition of Visual Arts. The Academy's Art Purchase Program acquired one of his paintings from the 2020 exhibition. In 2023, he had a solo exhibition at artist Takashi Murakami's Tokyo gallery Kaikai Kiki.

== Themes and style ==
Foss's artwork explores themes of trauma, identity, and American consumer culture. He has cited childhood trauma and growing up around addiction as influences on his use of childlike imagery. He paints distorted, psychedelic snakes, cartoon figures, smiley faces, and rainbows.

== Critical reception ==
Foss's work has been covered in Artforum and reviewed in The New York Times. Interview covered Avarice ahead of its opening, describing the series of 100 abstract works in reds, oranges, and charcoal blacks as Foss's response to the economic conditions he connected to the September 11 attacks.

Art critic Carlo McCormick connects Foss's work to American cultural identity and class, writing that Foss draws from "that lowbrow mix of hot rods, punk rock and skateboard graphics, black light posters, gang graffiti, lowriders and tattoos endemic to American youth of the post-war era." McCormick contrasts Foss's approach with traditional American desert painters like Georgia O'Keeffe and Frederic Remington, describing Foss's landscapes as "the desert you find airbrushed on the sides of vans, a wily picturesque that has nothing to do with beauty."

== Personal life ==
Foss lives in New York City. He is dyslexic, sober, and vegan.

== Exhibitions ==
=== Solo ===
- Avarice, Mallick Williams & Co., New York City, 2011
- Cognitive Behavioral Therapy, Padre Gallery, NYC, 2020
- Serpents & Rainbows, New Image Art, Los Angeles, 2021
- Carnival, Kaikai Kiki Gallery, Tokyo, 2023

=== Group ===
- Shred, Perry Rubenstein Gallery, New York, 2010
- American Two Shot, New York, 2012
- In Bloom, Quin Hotel, New York, 2018
- Invitational Exhibition of Visual Arts, American Academy of Arts and Letters, New York, 2012
- Invitational Exhibition of Visual Arts, American Academy of Arts and Letters, New York, 2020

=== Curated ===
- Draw, Museo de la Ciudad, Mexico City, 2010
- Nose Bleed, Fuse Gallery, NYC, 2012

== Publications ==
- Draw. Mexico City: Museo de la Ciudad de México. 2010. ISBN 978-84-92480-05-0.
- Twenty Twenty: A Year in Pictures. New York: Blurring Books. 2022. ISBN 978-1-7361562-1-6.
- Solomostry: Snakes and Shapes. Trento: Cellar Contemporary. 2023. OCLC 1418716327.

=== Featured in ===
- Burkeman, DB (2022). Stickers: From Punk Rock to Contemporary Art. Vol. 2. New York: Universe. ISBN 978-0-7893-4139-6.

== See also ==
- Lit Lounge
