= Bell & Spurling =

English duo

Bell & Spurling are an English musical duo. Consisting of Martin Bell and Johnny Spurling, they formed in the 1990s and are best known for the single, "Sven, Sven, Sven", which reached number seven in the UK Singles Chart in October 2001.They also had a hit with Goldenballs and appeared on Top of the Pops on both occasions. They sold over half a million singles and the tracks appeared on compilation albums totalling over 1 million sales. They had a radio show on Capital Gold and more recently their own show on Love Sport Radio. Originally session singers, they were known for their soulful voices and were regular singers at celebrity parties for the likes of Rod Stewart and Simon Cowell. They signed to Warner Music and the football anthems have various revamps each time the England team play in tournaments. More recently they appeared in Qatar and Dubai for the World Cup. They are also regular guests on GB News. The song was inspired by the England football team's 5–1 victory against Germany, and contained recordings of Jonathan Pearce's commentary from that match. It mentions a number of contemporary England and German footballing figures and events, most notably Sven-Göran Eriksson, to whom the song title and refrain refer.

== Music career ==
Martin Bell from Chigwell, and Johnny Spurling from Romford, were both session singers who became a duo. Beginning their career singing at parties for Rod Stewart and Simon Cowell, they went on to appear on London-based radio stations such as Talksport and Capital FM with their stories and songs. Following their two pop hits "Sven, Sven, Sven" and "Goldenballs (Mr Beckham to You)", the pair appeared on various television programmes, including a couple of appearances on Top of the Pops. Bell is still writing and performing with his band The Atlantic Band, as well as hosting corporate functions. Bell was also involved in the pilot episode for The Only Way Is Essex, but subsequently was pulled from the show. Spurling appeared in the comedy film The Flirting Club. In June 2018 he went to the Edinburgh Festival with the show Terry Alderton's All Crazy Now.

Bell wrote and performed the song "Running Free" for the film Run for Your Wife.

In 2018, ready for the World Cup in Russia the duo revamped their classic "Sven, Sven, Sven" and released "Gareth, Gareth, Gareth". It was not a hit.

== Discography ==
Year	Title	UK Singles Chart
2001	"Sven, Sven, Sven"	7
2002	"Goldenballs (Mr Beckham To You)"	25
2018	"Gareth, Gareth, Gareth"	DNC
