= How Wonderful You Are =

2001 single by Gordon Haskell

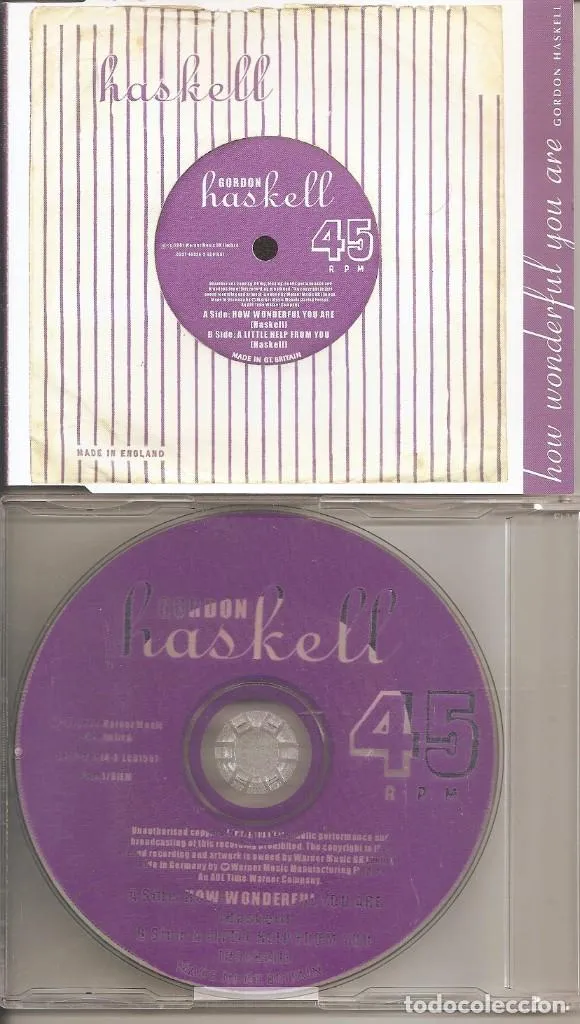

Single by Gordon Haskell

from the album Harry's Bar
- B-side: "A Little Help from You"
- Released: 17 December 2001
- Length: 4:00
- Label: Flying Sparks
- Songwriter: Gordon Haskell

"How Wonderful You Are" is a song by English musician Gordon Haskell. It was released as a single in the Christmas period of 2001 after mass promotion by BBC Radio 2 where it became a favourite of listeners after being featured by the drive-time presenter Johnnie Walker. It was the UK Christmas number-two in 2001 behind Robbie Williams and Nicole Kidman's cover of "Somethin' Stupid". The song is the most requested song of all time at Radio 2.

The song was covered in Finnish by Kirka for his album Sinut Siinä Nään in 2002. A mix version was released by Larry Peace in 2017. Haskell re-recorded the song in a samba version for his 2020 album The Cat Who's Got the Cream, featuring jazz trumpeter Guy Barker.

== Charts ==
=== Weekly charts ===
Chart (2001–2002)	Peak position
Europe (Eurochart Hot 100)	20
Netherlands (Single Top 100)	90
Scotland Singles (OCC)	3
UK Singles (OCC)	2
UK Indie (OCC)	1

=== Year-end charts ===
Chart (2001)	Position
UK Singles (OCC)	100

== Certifications ==
Region	Certification	Certified units/sales
United Kingdom (BPI)	Silver	200,000^{^}
^{^} Shipments figures based on certification alone.
