= Gordon Haskell =

English musician and songwriter (1946–2020)

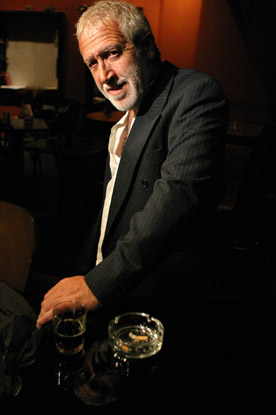
- Haskell on the cover of The Lady Wants To Know (2004)

Background information
- Born: 27 April 1946
- Origin: Verwood, Dorset, England
- Died: 15 October 2020 (aged 74)
- Genres: Rock, folk, jazz, country, blues
- Occupations: Musician, songwriter, vocalist, music producer
- Instruments: Vocals, guitar, bass guitar
- Years active: 1965–2020
- Labels: Wilderness, East West, Voiceprint
- Formerly of: The League of Gentlemen; The Fleur de Lys; King Crimson
- Website: gordonhaskell.com

Gordon Haskell (27 April 1946 – 15 October 2020) was an English musician and songwriter. A pop, rock, jazz, country and blues vocalist, guitarist, and bassist, he worked with his school friend Robert Fripp in early bands. He gained recognition as bass player for the Fleur de Lys in 1966 and, after the departure of King Crimson co-founder Greg Lake, contributed a guest vocal to "Cadence and Cascade" on In the Wake of Poseidon (1970), subsequently joining the band as bassist and singer for their album Lizard (also 1970).

After leaving King Crimson, Haskell continued as a solo musician, reaching international fame in 2001 with his hit "How Wonderful You Are" and the platinum-selling album Harry's Bar.

== Early life ==
Haskell was born on 27 April 1946 to Kathleen Haskell, who had been widowed in 1943 when her husband, Wing commander Walter Ralph Haskell, was shot down in the RAF bombing raid of Peenemünde. Haskell's biological father was Harry Hionides, an American pilot of Greek ancestry, whom Kathleen had a short affair with after meeting at a local dance.

According to Haskell, his family was "not musical," yet he possessed an inclination towards music from a young age, stating: "I would return from church with the hymns in my head and was attracted by the words of beauty and truth and wisdom set to memorable melodies so I began to learn how to play the 'songs'".

== 1960s ==
During his last years at Wimborne Grammar School, class mate Robert Fripp introduced him to the bass guitar and the two friends played together in The Ravens, their first band. The band split in the following year. During the late 1960s Haskell moved from Dorset to London (for a brief period, sharing a flat with Jimi Hendrix). While playing bass in the psychedelic pop band the Fleur De Lys, who were hired by Atlantic Records as a full-time session band, Haskell recorded a few singles with the group to minimal success but achieving a No 1 and No 3 in South Africa and Australia as a songwriter with his song "Lazy Life". During the two years at Atlantic he worked with Isaac Hayes and David Porter (who wrote many songs for the Atlantic stable, including for Sam and Dave) and worked with a variety of producers namely Glyn Johns, Donnie Elbert, Arif Mardin and George Martin.

After a brief stint in The Flower Pot Men, Haskell joined Cupid's Inspiration for around three months, whose producer, Jimmy Duncan, helped secure a deal for Haskell with CBS Records. Recorded at Lansdowne Studios with Duncan, his debut solo album Sail in My Boat was recorded for the U.K. division of CBS Records in 1969 but the album did not chart. A song from the album, "Zanzibar", was covered by Wanda Arletti, and reached No 2 on the singles chart in South Africa on January 1st, 1971. Reflecting on his debut solo record, Haskell later said: "I was impressed with the orchestrations but I was not in control so I regard it as a young artist just starting out and doing as I was told rather than ‘directing’. [...] It’s not bad though, but could have been a lot better."

== 1970s ==
When King Crimson parted company with original singer Greg Lake, Haskell was asked to be the bassist and vocalist in the transitional King Crimson line-up of 1970. He appeared on the albums In the Wake of Poseidon (although just for one song, "Cadence and Cascade") and Lizard. However, Haskell's preference for Nat King Cole and Ray Charles songs led to frustration in Fripp's band, and his folk and blues-oriented interests were in conflict with Crimson's more complicated progressive rock musical style. Haskell left the band acrimoniously following the recording of Lizard, during rehearsals for planned live work. He objected to his vocal contributions being manipulated, using distortion and by being sped up, feeling it would damage his reputation. In an interview shortly before his death, Haskell criticized King Crimson as "amateurs full of a false sense of great importance. It was 24 hours of listening to bullshit hailed as 'art'".

Haskell subsequently auditioned for Atlantic Records head Ahmet Ertegün, who had signed Ray Charles and Aretha Franklin, which led to Arif Mardin producing Haskell's 1971 solo album It Is and It Isn’t. The album has guest appearances from top session musicians, notably John Wetton, who would join King Crimson in late 1972. Again, the album was not a commercial success. As the 1970s progressed, Haskell found himself playing supporting stints with Cliff Richard and Tim Hardin. For a short time in 1974 he rehearsed with the group Stackridge. Though Haskell decided not to join the group, Stackridge did record a song from It Is and It Isn’t. Originally called "Worms", the version on the 1975 album Extravaganza was re-titled, "No One's More Important Than the Earthworm".

== 1980s and 1990s ==
Haskell arrived at the start of the 1980s deeply in debt and dissatisfied with the music business. He left for Denmark in 1984, playing "seven nights a week to drunks in bars." During this time his voice became a lot stronger. His debt eventually eliminated, he returned to England and continued playing solo and small-band gigs in tiny pubs and clubs. "I was trapped," Haskell recalls, "but the time wasn't wasted. I was practising. I was in the wilderness for a long time. But I met a lot of really interesting characters in bars, and that's where my songs tend to come from. I was self-contained, self-supporting, and I didn't really have anything to do with the recording industry."

His single "Almost Certainly" Covered by Judy Boucher reached number one in South Africa in 1990. An album called Hambledon Hill followed. It did well on airplay with BBC Radio 1's DJ, Bob Harris saying he "loved it" and become record of the week in BBC radio Scotland . A single of the same name was planned but the distributor went bankrupt and the deal fell through. However, in 1994, the Voiceprint record label re-issued the album.

== Success ==
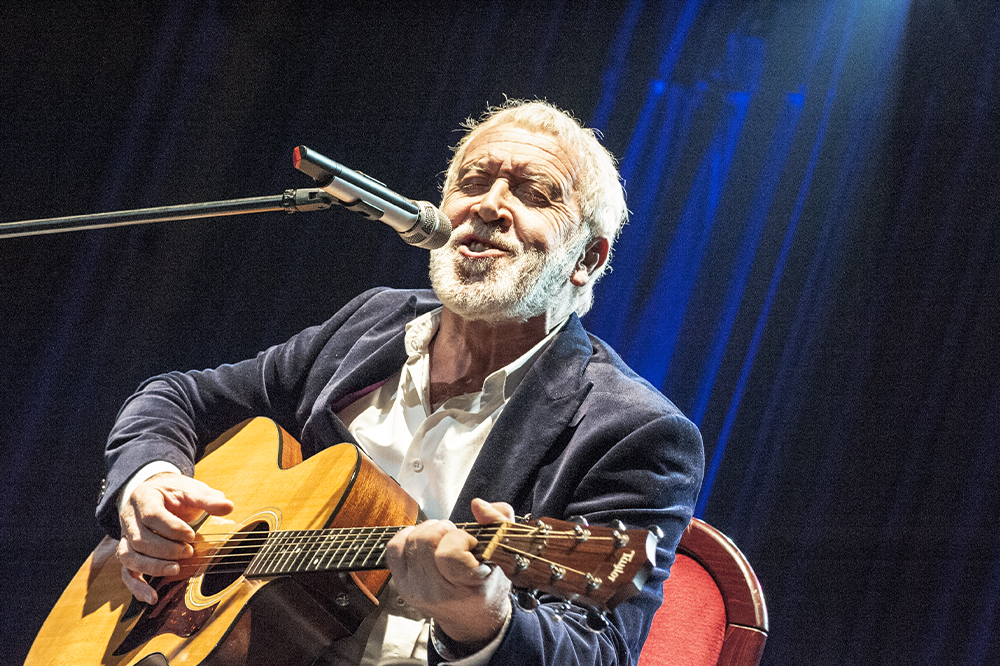
Gordon Haskell on stage in Warsaw, Poland, November 2011.

After releasing the album Butterfly in China in (1996), he then did a small tour of America which delighted King Crimson fans even though he was only there to do solo material and see if he could get a record deal. This never happened and he went back to England to continue performing in bars. He then became introduced to Robbie McIntosh by Ken Watkins about performing together. This is where he released All in The Scheme of Things (2000). Seeing an opportunity, he was approached by manager of Robbie McIntosh, Ian Brown about recording opportunities. Haskell accepted, but specified that he wanted to make his record the old-fashioned way: live, no overdubs, and grounded in solid songwriting and classically styled performances.

The album that was made in February 2001, called Look Out contained a jazz-tinged ballad entitled "How Wonderful You Are". After being sent on tour with Hamish Stuart & Robbie Mcintosh to Germany in June 2001. Look Out was released to no or little press. Gordon thought otherwise and so the song "How Wonderful You Are" was given to Johnnie Walker of BBC Radio 2 the day before 9/11. Even before its release as a single in late 2001, Haskell's song surpassed the Beatles' "Hey Jude" and Frank Sinatra's "My Way" to become the most-requested song on BBC Radio 2. Despite limited promotion, it charted as the Christmas number two in the UK Singles Chart and went on to sell more than 400,000 copies.

As "How Wonderful You Are" scaled the UK Singles Chart, the British press began to pay attention to the story of its unsung creator. Haskell was quoted as saying, "Suddenly, after all these years, there's all this attention. But I've been living on skid row for so long that if I make a million now, it's back pay." As a result of the success of the single Haskell was offered a multimillion-dollar recording contract from the UK label East West Records, distributed by Warner Bros. Records. The album Harry's Bar was released on 7 January 2002. It peaked at number 2 in the UK Albums Chart, and found similar success in Europe. Later on that year Shadows on the Wall was released, but only made Number 44 in the UK Albums Chart.

His next album reached number 14 on the Polish album charts. Called The Lady Wants to Know, it contained eleven tracks, was produced by Hamish Stuart and featured Tony O'Malley and Robbie McIntosh. A DVD, "The Road To Harry's Bar", was released in 2005 and Haskell also published his autobiography under the same title, with the foreword written by David Nobbs, creator of The Fall and Rise of Reginald Perrin.

After commuting from the Greek island of Skopelos (his father was Greek) for eight years he returned to the UK in 2017 for a British tour with Hannah's Yard, and planned to continue touring and recording as and when he chose. He was a resident of the UK.

== Death ==
Haskell died from cancer on 15 October 2020 at the age of 74. His death was announced on 18 October through his Facebook page, and confirmed via his agent's website the following day.

== Discography ==
=== Solo ===
==== Studio albums ====
Title	Album details	Peak chart positions							Certification
Title	Album details	UK	FIN	FRA	GER	NLD	POL	SPA	Certification
Sail in My Boat	Released: 1969; Label: CBS (original) Voiceprint Records (re-issue); Formats: LP, CD, Digital Download	—	—	—	—	—	—		
It Is And It Isn't	Released: 1971; Label: Atco Records (original release), Wounded Bird Records (reissues); Formats: LP, CD, digital download	—	—	—	—	—	—		
Serve at Room Temperature	Released: 1979; Label: Evangel Records; Formats: LP, CD, Digital Download	—	—	—	—	—	—		
Hambledon Hill	Released: 1990; Label: Voiceprint Records/BMG; Formats: LP, Cassette CD Digital Download	—	—	—	—	—	—		
It's Just a Plot to Drive You Crazy	Released: 1992; Label: Voiceprint Records/Blueprint; Formats: CD, Digital Download	—	—	—	—	—	—		
Butterfly in China	Released: 11 November 1996; Label: Wilderness Records; Formats: CD, digital download	—	—	—	—	—	—		
All in the Scheme of Things	Released: 11 September 2000; Label: Wilderness Records; Formats: CD, digital download	—	—	—	—	—	—		
Look Out	Released: 2001; Label: Flying Sparks Records; Formats: CD	—	—	—	—	—	—		
Harry's Bar	Released: 14 January 2002; Label: East West Records; Formats: CD, digital download	2	7	30	38	24	5		Silver UK; Gold UK
Shadows on the Wall	Released: 14 October 2002; Label: Flying Sparks Records; Formats: CD, digital download	44	18	—	—	—	8		
The Lady Wants To Know	Released: 4 October 2004; Label: Hypertension / Rand M Records; Formats: CD, digital download	—	—	—	—	—	14		
One Day Soon	Released: 24 September 2010; Label: Fullfill Records; Formats: CD, digital download	—	—	—	—	—	—		
The Cat Who's Got The Cream	Released: 24 January 2020; Label: Zoo Records; Formats: CD, digital download	—	—	—	—	—	—	35	

==== Live albums ====
Title	Album details
Gordon Haskell w Szczecinie Live!	Released: August 2008; Label: Polskie Radio Szczecin; Formats: CD
The Road To Harry's Bar, All Hits Live	Released: 25 November 2008; Label: Metal Mind Productions; Formats: CD, digital download

==== Compilation albums ====
Title	Album details	Peak chart positions	
Title	Album details	UK	PL
All My Life	Released: 27 April 2002; Label: Union Square Music; Formats: CD, digital download	154	—
The Collection: 18 of His Finest Songs	Released: 22 October 2002; Label: Metro Music; Formats: CD	—	—
The Right Time: A Collection	Released: 1 November 2002; Label: Crimson Productions; Formats: CD	—	—
How Wonderful You Are (The Best Of)	Released: 2003; Label: Warner Music Poland; Formats: CD, Cassette	—	15

==== Video albums ====
Title	Album details
The Road To Harry's Bar	Released: 7 November 2005; Label: Metal Mind Productions; Formats: DVD

==== EPs ====
Title	Album details
Voiceprint Radio Sessions	Released: 24 October 1994; Label: Voiceprint; Formats: CD

==== Singles ====
Title	Year		Peak chart positions				Certifications
Title	Year	UK	NLD	PLD	HUN	ALBUM	
"Boat Trip"	1969					Sail in My Boat	
"Oo La Di Doo Da Day"	1970					Sail in My Boat	
"Sitting by the Fire"	1972	—	—			It Is and It Isn't	
"I Need Your Love So Much"	1980	—	—			Serve at Room Temperature	
"Castles in the Sky"	1980	—	—			Serve at Room Temperature	
"5-10-15"	1981	—	—			non-album single	
"Hambledon Hill"	1990	—	—			Hambeldon Hill	
"The Right Time"	1991					Hambeldon Hill	
"More Yin Than Yang"	1996					Butterfly in China	
"How Wonderful You Are"	2001	2	90	1		Harry's Bar	Silver
"There Goes My Heart Again"	2002	133	—			Harry's Bar	
"All the Time in the World"	2002			15		Harry's Bar	
"The Music Played" (Gordon Haskell & Maarit)	2003	—	—			Shadows on the Wall (Finnish Edition)	
"Whole Wide World"	2003			38		Shadows on the Wall	
"The Lady Wants To Know"	2004	—	—			The Lady Wants To Know	
"All in the Scheme of Things" (Kasia Skrzynecka & Gordon Haskell)	2005	—	—			Koa	
"Everybody Wants To Go To Heaven"	2006	—	—			non-album single	
"Take My Breath Away"	2008	—	—			non-album single	
"Forevermore"	2010	—	—			One Day Soon	
"My Bike"	2013					My Bike	
"I'm Letting Everybody Know"	2015	—	—			I'm Letting Everybody Know	
"W Rio" with Pitor Salata	2016					PS	
"it's Me and You and Them and Us "	2018					The Cat who's got the Cream	
"I'm Still Mad about You"	2019				19	The Cat who's got the Cream	
"How Wonderful You Are 2019"	2019					The Cat who's got the Cream	
"I'm Still Trying to Figure Out"	2020					The Cat who's got the Cream	
"—" denotes a recording that did not chart or was not released in that territory.

==== Collaboration ====
- 1991 : Ophelia's Shadow by Toyah Willcox – keyboards on the title track. Robert Fripp also played guitar on the album.

=== As band member ===
==== Fleurs De Lys ====
Singles : The singles noted here only include those with Gordon Haskell as bassist and singer :

- 1966 : "Circles" / "So Come On" – Immediate Records IM 32
- 1966 : "Mud in Your Eye" / "I've Been Trying" – Polydor Records 56124
- 1967 : "I Can See The Light" / "Prodigal Son" – Polydor Records 56200
- 1968 : "Gong with the Luminous Nose" / "Hammer Head" – Polydor Records 56251
- 1967 : Shyster "Tick Tock" / "That's a Hoe Down" Polydor – 56202

Compilations :

- 1996 : Les Fleurs De Lys
- 1997 : Reflections – Blueprint Records (4) – BP256CD
- 2002 : Les Fleurs De Lys – Reedition of the first compilation album
- 2013 : You've Got To Earn It – Acid Jazz Records AJXLP324

==== Cupid's Inspiration ====
- 1968 : " I Want To Give It All To You" Written Song on Album Yesterday Has Gone and played bass

==== King Crimson ====
- 1970 : In the Wake of Poseidon – vocals on "Cadence and Cascade"
- 1970 : Lizard – bass and vocals throughout, except for "Prince Rupert Awakes" (sung by Jon Anderson)

==== Joe ====
- 1977 Minoru Muraoka And His Group with Joe – Memories of Chi Yo
- 1978 Joe – How Can I Resist/ Sweet Annabelle (Written both Songs and played bass)

== Books ==
- The Road to Harry's Bar: Forty Years on the Potholed Path to Stardom, 2006, Mainstream Publishing, ISBN 9781840189872
- " The Importance of Salmon " Gordon Haskell (Author) Sue Haskell (Illustrator) Self Published 14 June 2019
