= Flawless (The Ones song) =

1999 single by the Ones

Single by the Ones
- Released: October 8, 2001
- Length: 7:42
- Label: Groovilicious
- Songwriter: The Ones
- Producer: The Ones

The Ones singles chronology
"Flawless" (2001)	"Superstar" (2003)

"Flawless" is a song by American electronic music trio the Ones. It was first released in 1999 on the A Touch of Class label, then was re-released in 2001 through Groovilicious. The re-release peaked at number seven on the UK Singles Chart and reached number four on the US Billboard Dance Club Play chart. According to the Australian Recording Industry Association (ARIA), the song was the most popular club hit of Australia in 2001. The song samples Gary's Gang's 1978 song "Keep On Dancin'" and "Wordy Rappinghood" by Tom Tom Club.

English singer-songwriter George Michael sampled "Flawless" for his song "Flawless (Go to the City)", which was released in June 2004. The song peaked at number eight on the UK Singles Chart, one position lower than the original's peak.

== Track listings ==
US CD single

1. "Flawless" (radio edit)
2. "Flawless" (Phunk Investigation vox)
3. "Flawless" (Different Gear remix)
4. "Flawless" (Sono's Tuxedo main mix)
5. "Flawless" (original mix)

UK CD and cassette single, Australasian CD single

1. "Flawless" (radio edit) – 3:08
2. "Flawless" (Phunk Investigation vocal mix) – 7:39
3. "Flawless" (Sharp Hammerhead remix) – 8:09

UK 12-inch single

A1. "Flawless" (Phunk Investigation vocal mix) – 7:39
AA1. "Flawless" (Sharp Hammerhead remix) – 5:45
AA2. "Flawless" (Different Gear remix) – 6:23

European CD single

1. "Flawless" (radio edit)
2. "Flawless" (Phunk Investigation vocal mix)

== Charts ==
=== Weekly charts ===
Chart (2001–2002)	Peak position
Australia (ARIA)	44
Australian Club Chart (ARIA)	1
Australian Dance (ARIA)	6
Belgium (Ultratip Bubbling Under Flanders)	2
Belgium (Ultratip Bubbling Under Wallonia)	6
Europe (Eurochart Hot 100)	30
France (SNEP)	38
Ireland (IRMA)	29
Ireland Dance (IRMA)	2
Netherlands (Single Top 100)	90
Scottish Singles Sales (Official Charts)	8
UK Singles (Official Charts)	7
UK Dance (Official Charts)	1
US Dance Club Play (Billboard)	4

=== Year-end charts ===
Chart (2001)	Position
Australian Club Chart (ARIA)	1
UK Singles (OCC)	129

== Release history ==
Region	Date	Format(s)	Label(s)	Ref.
United Kingdom	October 8, 2001	12-inch vinyl; CD	Positiva	
Australia	October 29, 2001	CD	Positiva	

== See also ==
- "Flawless (Go to the City)"
- List of UK Dance Singles Chart number ones of 2001
