= M&S (production team) =

English songwriting and music production team

- Also known as: Street Sense, the Balls of London, State of Mind, Visual
- Origin: London, England
- Genres: Garage, house, dance
- Occupations: Producing, songwriting
- Years active: 1994-2007
- Labels: London, FFRR, Big Beat, 1001 Records
- Members: Ricky Morrison; Fran Sidoli

M&S, also known as M&S Productions, were an English songwriting and music production team, based in London and consisted of garage DJs Ricky Morrison and Fran Sidoli. During the late 1990s and early 2000s, they collaborated with various artists on remixes and their own singles, using a variety of aliases. M&S are best known for their song "Salsoul Nugget (If U Wanna)", which reached the top 10 of the UK Singles Chart in 2001.

== Biography ==
Ricky Morrison and Fran Sidoli formed M&S Productions in London, England, in 1994. The pair had attended school together, after which Morrison worked as a record shop assistant as well as a garage DJ. M&S recorded remixes for such artists as Urban Discharge, Kenny Thomas, Beverly Brown, and Soul Corporation. The duo, also going by names including Street Sense, the Balls of London, State of Mind, and Visual, recorded singles for MCA Records, Todd Terry's Freeze imprint, and Strictly Rhythm, among other labels. Morrison and Sidoli established their own dance label, 1001 Records, in 1996.

In 2000, M&S (using the name M&S Presents the Girl Next Door) released the single "Salsoul Nugget (If U Wanna)". It was re-released on London Records in March 2001, at which time the song was added to BBC Radio 1's 'A' playlist. The song peaked at number six on the UK Singles Chart and number one on the UK Dance Chart. It also reached number 47 in Italy and number 21 on the U.S. Billboard Dance chart. The British Academy of Songwriters, Composers and Authors (BASCA) awarded M&S with a Chart Newcomer Award in 2001.

== Discography ==
=== Singles ===
Year	Song	Peak chart positions			
Year	Song	UK	UK Dance	ITA	US Dance
1995	"Special" (featuring Robbie Craig)	—	—	—	—
1995	"Keep On" (featuring Jaye Ella Ruth)	—	—	—	—
1996	"Justify" (presents the Girl Next Door)	—	—	—	—
1996	"Deeper" (presents the Guy Next Door)	—	—	—	—
1996	"The Music" (featuring Rose)	—	—	—	—
1997	"Saturday" (featuring Michelle Douglas)	—	—	—	—
2000	"Salsoul Nugget (If U Wanna)" (presents the Girl Next Door)	6	1	47	21
2001	"Ready or Not" (presents the Girl Next Door)	—	—	—	—
2007	"Let the Music Spill" (featuring Starvue)	—	—	—	—
"—" denotes releases that did not chart.
