= Salsoul Nugget (If U Wanna) =

Single by M&S Presents the Girl Next Door
- Released: 26 March 2001
- Recorded: 2000
- Genre: House
- Length: 3:28 (radio edit); 6:01 (extended version)
- Label: London, FFRR, Big Beat
- Songwriters: M&S & Double Exposure
- Producers: M&S

"Salsoul Nugget (If U Wanna)" is a song by British production duo M&S as part of their musical project, the Girl Next Door. Released on London Records in March 2001, the song peaked at number six on the UK Singles Chart and number 21 on the Billboard Hot Dance Club Play chart.

== Background ==
M&S, using the name M&S Presents the Girl Next Door, collaborated on "Salsoul Nugget (If U Wanna)" with Natasha Bryce, who provided vocals on the track. Bryce, a former model who was later cast in the 1997 film The Fifth Element, was recruited by M&S because, according to Daily Record writer John Dingwall, the duo "decided to get a female singer along to give the track a commercial edge." The song contains samples of Double Exposure's "Everyman" and Loleatta Holloway's "Hit and Run". Both artists and their respective singles are associated with Salsoul Records, hence the song's title.

== Release and reception ==
"Salsoul Nugget (If U Wanna)" was a white label hit in early 2000; the single was officially re-released on London Records in 2001. It peaked at number six on the UK Singles Chart and number one on the UK Dance Chart. It also reached number 47 in Italy and number 21 on the U.S. dance chart. Music Week called the track "infectious" and that it was "boosted" by Bryce's vocals. Emily Sheffield of the London Evening Standard compared the song to "Groovejet (If This Ain't Love)", a 2000 hit by Spiller featuring Sophie Ellis-Bextor. "It's the same set-up - two guys with a nice tune (Ricky Morrison and Fran Sidoli) hook up with model/singer (Natasha) - and it works." An April 2001 Billboard article also noted the similarity to "Groovejet" while adding that Bryce "effortlessly wraps her lips around Ricky Morrison and Fran Sidoli's bubbly yet rugged Double Exposure-sampling production."

== Track listing ==
UK CD single

No.	Title	Writer(s)	Producer(s)	Length
1.	"Salsoul Nugget (If U Wanna)" (M&S radio version) (feat. Tobu)	M&S & Double Exposure	M&S	3:29
2.	"Salsoul Nugget (If U Wanna)" (Original Klub radio)	M&S & Double Exposure	M&S	3:55
3.	"Salsoul Nugget (If U Wanna)" (M&S extended vocal)	M&S & Double Exposure	M&S	6:01

== Charts ==
Chart (2001)	Peak position
UK Singles Chart	6
UK Dance Singles Chart	1
Italian Singles Chart	47
US Billboard Hot Dance Club Play	21

=== Year-end charts ===
Chart (2001)	Position
UK Singles (OCC)	101
