= Santos (DJ) =

Italian DJ and musician (born 1971)

- Born: Sante Pucello; 28 November 1971 (age 53); Frosinone, Italy
- Genres: Electronic, house, big beat
- Years active: 1992–present
- Labels: Mantra Vibes, Distinct'ive Records
- Website: http://www.santosmusic.com/

Sante "Santos" Pucello (born 28 November 1971, Frosinone, Italy) is an Italian DJ and musician. In 1992, he started making music with his friend, and he recorded his first record two years later.

In 1995, Mantra Vibes released his track "The Piano". In 2001, "Camels" peaked at #9 in the UK Singles Chart, following support from Pete Tong, Annie Nightingale, Judge Jules and Basement Jaxx. Soon after, his first album, R U Shakadelic? was released.
