= Stuntmasterz =

British musical group

Stuntmasterz were a British music group featuring Steve Harris, Rob Davis and Pete Cook. They are best known for their hit single "The Ladyboy Is Mine", a mash-up of the songs "The Boy Is Mine" by Brandy and Monica, and Modjo's "Lady (Hear Me Tonight)". The song peaked at number 10 on the UK Singles Chart in March 2001, while also reaching the top 50 of several charts across Europe.

The initial white label release of "The Ladyboy Is Mine" in 2000 samples Modjo's "Lady (Hear Me Tonight)", however Warner Music UK could not clear the sample so for the official release in 2001, minus the vocals from "Lady (Hear Me Tonight)", a sample from "Soup for One" by Chic was used instead, as it was in the Modjo song.

== Discography ==
List of singles, with selected chart positions
| Title | Year | Peak chart positions | | | | |
| Title | Year | UK | AUS | FRA | GER | SWI |
|---|---|---|---|---|---|---|
| "Holiday Sounds Better with You" | 1998 | — | — | — | — | — |
| "The Ladyboy Is Mine" | 2001 | 10 | 95 | 32 | 50 | 34 |
