= The Ones =

American electronic dance music group

- Origin: New York City, New York, U.S.
- Genres: Electronic, house
- Years active: 1998–present
- Members: Paul Alexander; JoJo Americo
- Past members: Nashom Wooden (deceased)

The Ones are an American electronic dance music group. Their 2001 hit single "Flawless" peaked within the top ten of the charts in Belgium and the United Kingdom. The trio consisted of three male vocalists Paul Alexander, JoJo Americo, and Nashom Wooden, who met while working at the Greenwich Village boutique Patricia Field. Each of them has a background in performing, DJing, and being stylists within the underground New York club and fashion scenes.

Their debut single, "Flawless", was inspired by the 1999 film, which Nashom appeared in alongside Robert De Niro. It was first released on the New York based A Touch of Class Recordings label in 1999, and was popular among New York DJs even before its official release. In 2004, "Flawless" was sampled and had lyrics added to it by English singer and former Wham! member George Michael for his song "Flawless (Go to the City)". Michael's version peaked at number eight on the UK Singles Chart in July 2004, almost three years after the original had peaked at number seven on the chart. The group released a follow-up single, "Superstar", which reached number 45 in the same country.

In November 2006, they released "Ultramodern", with a music video and clips available on A Touch of Class's website. The Ones signed to Peacebisquit management in 2007. They tweaked their look and sound and released a 2008 single, "When We Get Together", with a video clip featuring cameos from the Scissor Sisters, Debbie Harry, Jody Watley, Fischerspooner, Ultra Naté, Peppermint, Cazwell, Colton Ford, and many others. Nomi Ruiz collaborated with the Ones on their single "Let's Celebrate!" from their fourth album Blast from the Past.

In August 2013, Cher released the video "A Woman's World" and almost immediately fans of the Ones complained of similarities to the Ones' video "Face & Body" which was released months earlier the same year. The band saw the comparison more as a compliment than controversy.

Nashom Wooden died on March 23, 2020, after reportedly contracting COVID-19.

== Discography ==
=== Singles ===
List of singles, with selected chart positions
| Title | Year | Peak chart positions | | | | |
| Title | Year | US Dance | AUS | FRA | NLD | UK |
|---|---|---|---|---|---|---|
| "Flawless" | 1999 | 4 | 44 | 38 | 90 | 7 |
| "Superstar" | 2003 | — | — | — | — | 45 |
| "I'm Going to Go" | 2004 | — | — | — | — | — |
| "Ultramodern" | 2006 | — | — | — | — | — |
| "Picture Perfect" | 2006 | — | — | — | — | — |
| "When We Get Together" | 2008 | — | — | — | — | — |
| "Let's Celebrate!" (featuring Nomi Ruiz) | 2011 | — | — | — | — | — |
| "Face & Body" | 2013 | — | — | — | — | — |
