= List of number-one country albums of 2002 (Australia) =

ARIA Charts number-one country albums of 2002 < 2001 2003 >

Other Australian number-one charts of 2002
- albums
- singles
- dance singles

Top Australian singles and albums of 2002
- Triple J Hottest 100
- top 25 singles
- top 25 albums

These are the Australian Country number-one albums of 2002, per the ARIA Charts.

Issue date	Album	Artist
7 January	There You'll Be	Faith Hill
14 January	There You'll Be	Faith Hill
21 January	There You'll Be	Faith Hill
28 January	There You'll Be	Faith Hill
4 February	Barricades & Brickwalls	Kasey Chambers
11 February	Barricades & Brickwalls	Kasey Chambers
18 February	Barricades & Brickwalls	Kasey Chambers
25 February	Barricades & Brickwalls	Kasey Chambers
4 March	Barricades & Brickwalls	Kasey Chambers
11 March	Barricades & Brickwalls	Kasey Chambers
18 March	Barricades & Brickwalls	Kasey Chambers
25 March	Barricades & Brickwalls	Kasey Chambers
1 April	Barricades & Brickwalls	Kasey Chambers
8 April	Barricades & Brickwalls	Kasey Chambers
15 April	Barricades & Brickwalls	Kasey Chambers
22 April	Barricades & Brickwalls	Kasey Chambers
29 April	Barricades & Brickwalls	Kasey Chambers
6 May	Barricades & Brickwalls	Kasey Chambers
13 May	Barricades & Brickwalls	Kasey Chambers
20 May	Barricades & Brickwalls	Kasey Chambers
27 May	Barricades & Brickwalls	Kasey Chambers
3 June	Barricades & Brickwalls	Kasey Chambers
10 June	Barricades & Brickwalls	Kasey Chambers
17 June	Barricades & Brickwalls	Kasey Chambers
24 June	Barricades & Brickwalls	Kasey Chambers
1 July	Barricades & Brickwalls	Kasey Chambers
8 July	Electric Rodeo	Lee Kernaghan
15 July	Electric Rodeo	Lee Kernaghan
22 July	Electric Rodeo	Lee Kernaghan
29 July	Barricades & Brickwalls	Kasey Chambers
5 August	The Essential Johnny Cash	Johnny Cash
12 August	The Essential Johnny Cash	Johnny Cash
19 August	The Essential Johnny Cash	Johnny Cash
26 August	The Essential Johnny Cash	Johnny Cash
2 September	The Essential Johnny Cash	Johnny Cash
9 September	Home	Dixie Chicks
16 September	Home	Dixie Chicks
23 September	Home	Dixie Chicks
30 September	Home	Dixie Chicks
7 October	Home	Dixie Chicks
14 October	Barricades & Brickwalls	Kasey Chambers
21 October	Barricades & Brickwalls	Kasey Chambers
28 October	Barricades & Brickwalls	Kasey Chambers
4 November	Barricades & Brickwalls	Kasey Chambers
11 November	Barricades & Brickwalls	Kasey Chambers
18 November	Barricades & Brickwalls	Kasey Chambers
25 November	Up!	Shania Twain
2 December	Up!	Shania Twain
9 December	Up!	Shania Twain
16 December	Up!	Shania Twain
23 December	Up!	Shania Twain
30 December	Up!	Shania Twain

== See also ==
- 2002 in music
- List of number-one albums of 2002 (Australia)
