= List of number-one urban singles of 2002 (Australia) =

ARIA Charts number-one urban singles of 2002 2003 >

Other Australian number-one charts of 2002
- albums
- singles
- dance singles

Top Australian singles and albums of 2002
- Triple J Hottest 100
- top 25 singles
- top 25 albums

The ARIA Urban Chart is a chart that ranks the best-performing Urban tracks singles of Australia. It is published by Australian Recording Industry Association (ARIA), an organisation who collect music data for the weekly ARIA Charts. To be eligible to appear on the chart, the recording must be a single, and be "predominantly of a Urban nature".

== Chart history ==
Issue date	Song	Artist(s)	Reference
7 January	"I'm Real"	Jennifer Lopez	
14 January	"I'm Real"	Jennifer Lopez	
21 January	"U Got It Bad"	Usher	
28 January	"U Got It Bad"	Usher	
4 February	"U Got It Bad"	Usher	
11 February	"U Got It Bad"	Usher	
18 February	"U Got It Bad"	Usher	
25 February	"Dance With Me"	112	
4 March	"Dance With Me"	112	
11 March	"Dance With Me"	112	
18 March	"Dance With Me"	112	
25 March	"Dance With Me"	112	
1 April	"Dance With Me"	112	
8 April	"Dance With Me"	112	
15 April	"Always on Time"	Ja Rule featuring Ashanti	
22 April	"Girlfriend"	NSYNC	
29 April	"Girlfriend"	NSYNC	
6 May	"Girlfriend"	NSYNC	
13 May	"Girlfriend"	NSYNC	
20 May	"Girlfriend"	NSYNC	
27 May	"Without Me"	Eminem	
3 June	"Without Me"	Eminem	
10 June	"Without Me"	Eminem	
17 June	"Without Me"	Eminem	
24 June	"Without Me"	Eminem	
1 July	"Without Me"	Eminem	
8 July	"Without Me"	Eminem	
15 July	"Without Me"	Eminem	
22 July	"Without Me"	Eminem	
29 July	"Without Me"	Eminem	
5 August	"Without Me"	Eminem	
12 August	"Without Me"	Eminem	
19 August	"Hot in Herre"	Nelly	
26 August	"Hot in Herre"	Nelly	
2 September	"Two Wrongs"	Wyclef Jean featuring Claudette Ortiz	
9 September	"Two Wrongs"	Wyclef Jean featuring Claudette Ortiz	
16 September	"Two Wrongs"	Wyclef Jean featuring Claudette Ortiz	
23 September	"Just a Little"	Liberty X	
30 September	"Cleanin' Out My Closet"	Eminem	
7 October	"Cleanin' Out My Closet"	Eminem	
14 October	"Gangsta Lovin'"	Eve featuring Alicia Keys	
21 October	"Dilemma"	Nelly featuring Kelly Rowland	
28 October	"Dilemma"	Nelly featuring Kelly Rowland	
4 November	"Dilemma"	Nelly featuring Kelly Rowland	
11 November	"Dilemma"	Nelly featuring Kelly Rowland	
18 November	"Dilemma"	Nelly featuring Kelly Rowland	
25 November	"Dilemma"	Nelly featuring Kelly Rowland	
2 December	"Dilemma"	Nelly featuring Kelly Rowland	
9 December	"Lose Yourself"	Eminem	
16 December	"Lose Yourself"	Eminem	
23 December	"Lose Yourself"	Eminem	
30 December	"Lose Yourself"	Eminem	

== Number-one artists ==
Position	Artist	Weeks at No. 1
1	Eminem	18
2	Nelly	9
3	112	7
3	Kelly Rowland	7
4	NSYNC	5
4	Usher	5
5	Wyclef Jean	3
5	Claudette Ortiz	3
6	Jennifer Lopez	2
7	Ashanti	1
7	Eve	1
7	Alicia Keys	1
7	Ja Rule	1
7	Liberty X	1

== See also ==
- 2002 in music
- List of number-one singles of 2002 (Australia)
