= List of number-one club tracks of 2002 (Australia) =

ARIA Charts number-one club tracks of 2002 2003 >

Other Australian number-one charts of 2002
- albums
- singles
- dance singles

Top Australian singles and albums of 2002
- Triple J Hottest 100
- top 25 singles
- top 25 albums

This is a list of ARIA club chart number-one hits from 2002, which is collected from Australian Recording Industry Association (ARIA) from weekly DJ reports.

== Chart ==
Date		Song	Artist(s)	Reference
January	7	"Rapture"	iiO	
January	14	"Rapture"	iiO	
January	21	"Rapture"	iiO	
January	28	"It’s Gonna Be… (a Lovely day)"	Brancaccio & Aisher	
February	4	"Star Guitar"	The Chemical Brothers	
February	11	"So Lonely"	Jakatta	
February	18	"So Lonely"	Jakatta	
February	25	"Point of View"	DB Boulevard	
March	4	"Point of View"	DB Boulevard	
March	11	"Point of View"	DB Boulevard	
March	18	"Point of View"	DB Boulevard	
March	25	"Thrill Me"	Junior Jack	
April	1	"Thrill Me"	Junior Jack	
April	8	"Thrill Me"	Junior Jack	
April	15	"Wish I Didn't Miss You"	Angie Stone	
April	22	"Nassau Rules"	Knee Deep	
April	29	"Lazy"	X-Press 2 featuring David Byrne	
May	6	"At Night"	Shakedown	
May	13	"4 My People"	Missy Elliott	
May	20	"Beautiful"	Disco Montego featuring Katie Underwood	
May	27	"Dove (I'll Be Loving You)"	Moony	
June	3	"Dove (I'll Be Loving You)"	Moony	
June	10	"Dove (I'll Be Loving You)"	Moony	
June	17	"A Little Less Conversation"	Elvis Presley vs. JXL	
June	24	"A Little Less Conversation"	Elvis Presley vs. JXL	
July	1	"Southern Sun"	Paul Oakenfold	
July	8	"The Love I Have For You"	Dina Vass	
July	15	"All I Want Is You"	Rockmelons	
July	22	"It Just Won't Do"	Tim Deluxe featuring Sam Obernik	
July	29	"It Just Won't Do"	Tim Deluxe featuring Sam Obernik	
August	5	"It Just Won't Do"	Tim Deluxe featuring Sam Obernik	
August	12	"It Just Won't Do"	Tim Deluxe featuring Sam Obernik	
August	19	"I Aint Moving Out"	Darren Glen	
August	26	"Safe From Harm"	Narcotic Thrust featuring Yvonne John Lewis	
September	2	"Two Months Off"	Underworld	
September	9	"Two Months Off"	Underworld	
September	16	"Two Months Off"	Underworld	
September	23	"Sunshine Day 2002"	Glaubitz & Roc	
September	30	"Help Me"	Timo Maas featuring Kelis	
October	7	"Sound of Violence"	Cassius featuring Steve Edwards	
October	14	"Insane"	Dark Monks	
October	21	"Take Me With You"	Cosmos	
October	28	"Shiny Disco Balls"	Who Da Funk featuring Jessica Eve	
November	4	"77 Strings"	Kurtis Mantronik presents Chamonix	
November	11	"Die Another Day"	Madonna	
November	18	"I Ain't Playin"	Rockmelons	
November	25	"77 Strings"	Kurtis Mantronik presents Chamonix	
December	2	"Die Another Day"	Madonna	
December	9	"Shiny Disco Balls"	Who Da Funk featuring Jessica Eve	
December	16	"Work It"	Missy Elliott	
December	23	"Work It"	Missy Elliott	
December	30	"So Much Love to Give"	Together	

== Number-one artists ==
Position	Artist	Weeks at No. 1
1	DB Boulevard	4
1	Tim Deluxe	4
1	Sam Obernik	4
2	iiO	3
2	Junior Jack	3
2	Missy Elliott	3
2	Moony	3
2	Underworld	3
3	Elvis Presley	2
3	JXL	2
3	Jakatta	2
3	Kurtis Mantronik	2
3	Madonna	2
3	Rockmelons	2
3	Who Da Funk	2
3	Jessica Eve	2
4	Angie Stone	1
4	Darren Glen	1
4	Disco Montego	1
4	Katie Underwood	1
4	Brancaccio & Aisher	1
4	Cassius	1
4	Steve Edwards	1
4	The Chemical Brothers	1
4	Cosmos	1
4	Dark Monks	1
4	Dina Vass	1
4	Glaubitz	1
4	Kelis	1
4	Knee Deep	1
4	Narcotic Thrust	1
4	Yvonne John Lewis	1
4	Paul Oakenfold	1
4	Shakedown	1
4	Timo Maas	1
4	Together	1
4	X-Press 2	1
4	David Byrne	1

== See also ==
- ARIA Charts
- List of number-one singles of 2002 (Australia)
- List of number-one albums of 2002 (Australia)
- 2002 in music
