= Jodi Martin =

Australian singer-songwriter

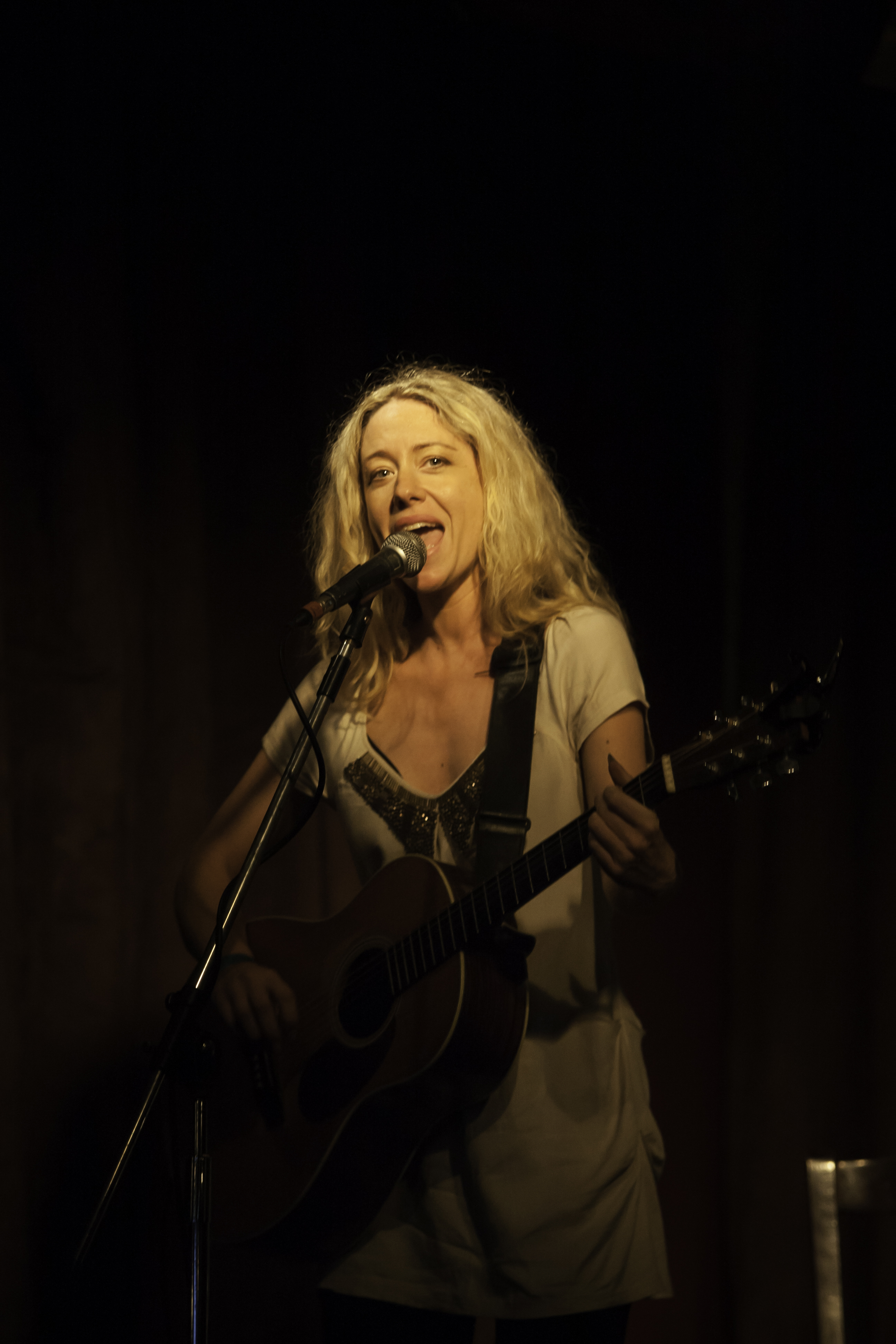
- Martin in 2013

Background information
- Born: Jodi Miranda Martin
- Origin: Ceduna, South Australia
- Genres: Pop, folk, rock, adult contemporary
- Occupations: Singer-songwriter, guitarist
- Instruments: Singing, guitar
- Years active: 1997–present
- Label: Hot Bread Records
- Website: Jodi Martin official site

Jodi Miranda Martin is an Australian singer-songwriter. Her professional music career began in mid-1996 while she was still a student, when she was the opening act for Arlo Guthrie's first Australian tour. Brisbane Times called her "one of Australia's most up and coming singer songwriters." She has been influenced by Joni Mitchell and compared to Tracy Chapman and Suzanne Vega.

== Career ==
=== 1980–1996: Early years and career beginnings ===
Martin grew up in Ceduna. She began spontaneously composing songs as a three-year-old. By the time she was four, her mum, a schoolteacher, had taken notice of Jodi's compositions and suggested Jodi record the songs on her cassette machine.

Jodi grew up listening to her parents' country and folk record collection from Slim Dusty to Johnny Cash to Bob Dylan. By the time Jodi was sixteen, she had taken up guitar and her brother Tony, who was two years younger, had taken up drums. Jodi taught her twelve-year-old sister Robyn bass guitar, and the teenagers began performing their original songs, along with rock and country covers from Cold Chisel to Kenny Rogers in the pubs and football clubs across South Australia.

At the age of sixteen, Jodi began to receive invitations to perform at country music showcases and festival talent quests. Jodi met Kasey and Nash Chambers of The Dead Ringer Band at the Victor Harbour Country Music Festival, and they shared stories of growing up on the Nullarbor Plain. Nash asked Jodi to send him a recording of her songs, which culminated in Kasey recording Jodi's song "Why" for the Dead Ringer Band's album Homefires in 1995.

In 1995, Jodi enrolled in Southern Cross University’s contemporary music course to further her studies in songwriting and composition, as well as audio production

At the age of 19, Jodi was playing a set at the Lismore Festival's Unplugged stage, which led to her supporting Arlo Guthrie on his 1996 Australian tour.

=== 1997–present: Recording career ===
In 1997, Jodi released Sandcastles. In 2000, Jodi released Water and Wood. The album won the North Coast Entertainment Industry's Dolphin Award for Album of the Year in 2001.

== Discography ==
=== Albums ===
List of live albums with selected details
Title	Album details
Sandcastles	Released: 1997; Label: Formats: CD
Water and Wood	Released: 2000; Label: Hot Bread Records; Formats: CD
Twenty One Stairs	Released: 2003; Label: Jodi Martin (JMCD 002); Formats: CD
15 Minutes Out to Sea	Released: 2005; Label: Hot Bread Records (HBR003); Formats: CD
Saltwater	Released: 2014; Label: Hot Bread Records (HBR005); Formats: CD, DD
