= The Dead Leaves =

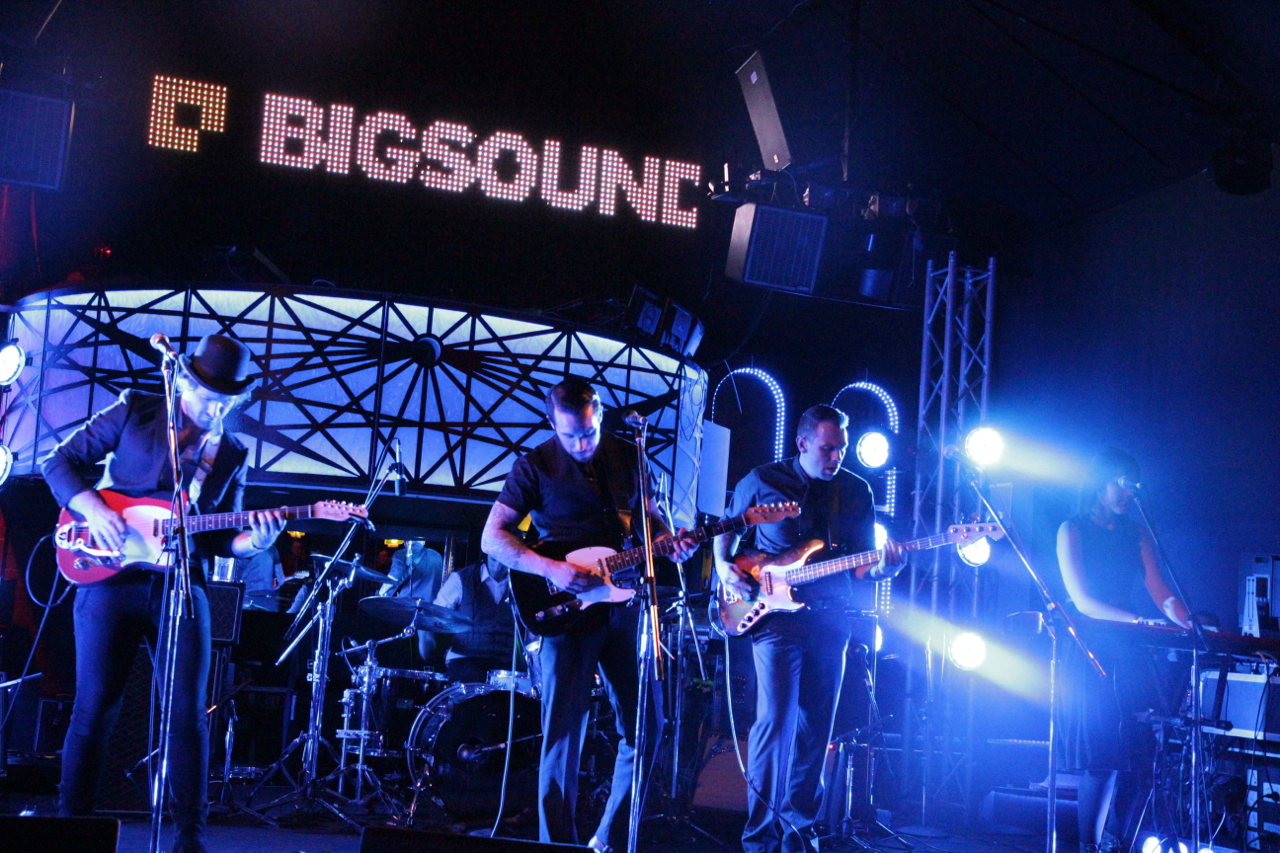
- The Dead Leaves performing at Bigsound 2011 (left to right): Andrew Pollock, Joel Witenberg, Matt Joe Gow, Cameron Grindrod and Clio Renner

Background information
- Origin: Melbourne, Australia
- Genres: Indie rock, alternative rock
- Years active: 2011–2014
- Labels: Liberation Music
- Past members: Matt Joe Gow; Andrew Pollock; Cameron Grindrod; Joel Witenberg; Clio Renner; Gin Wigmore; Emma Louise
- Website: http://www.thedeadleavesmusic.com

The Dead Leaves was an Australian alternative rock band formed in 2011. Their line up consisted of vocalist/guitarist Matt Joe Gow, guitarist Andrew Pollock, bassist Cameron Grindrod, keyboardist Clio Renner, drummer Joel Witenberg and vocalists Gin Wigmore and Emma Louise. The band was based in Melbourne, Australia, although Joe Gow is from New Zealand.

The core of the group had initially formed to serve as a backing band on Matt Joe Gow's solo album The Messenger, released through Liberation Music. Produced by Nash Chambers, the album features instrumental contributions from Jim Moginie and Bill Chambers. The singles from the album, "Come What May" and "The Light" went on to receive international airplay. The Messenger is, however, considered as predominantly a solo work.

The group's 2012 album Cities on the Sea (released in February 2012, produced by Scott Horscroft and Eric J Dubowsky) is regarded as their first and only official album. The album marks a change in direction from any previous solo material due to the numerous artists featuring and the groups' creative input.

In 2014 the band entered an indefinite hiatus due to the many competing and successful solo projects from members of the project. Matt Joe Gow continued to focus on his solo work alongside Pollock, whilst Louise, Wigmore and Renner all went on to release multiple solo albums. Joel Witenberg formed New York based indie band 'Surf Rock Is Dead'. When interviewed in 2019 Joe Gow stated that the album was a "special moment in time" but would not be repeated.

== Sources ==
- "We Have No Friends? EP by Surf Rock is Dead". WPTS Radio. 1 February 2018. Archived from the original on 1 February 2018.
- ""Seven Years" – Matt Joe Gow". Sounds of Oz. 23 September 2016.
- Rinaldo, Talia (20 September 2018). "Matt Joe Gow: Break Rattle and Roll". Forte Magazine.
- "Music review: Matt Joe Gow". Otago Daily Times. 17 September 2018.
- "Music review: The Dead Leaves". Beat Magazine. 10 September 2012.
