= Australiana =

Cultural, natural or geographical objects evoking Australia

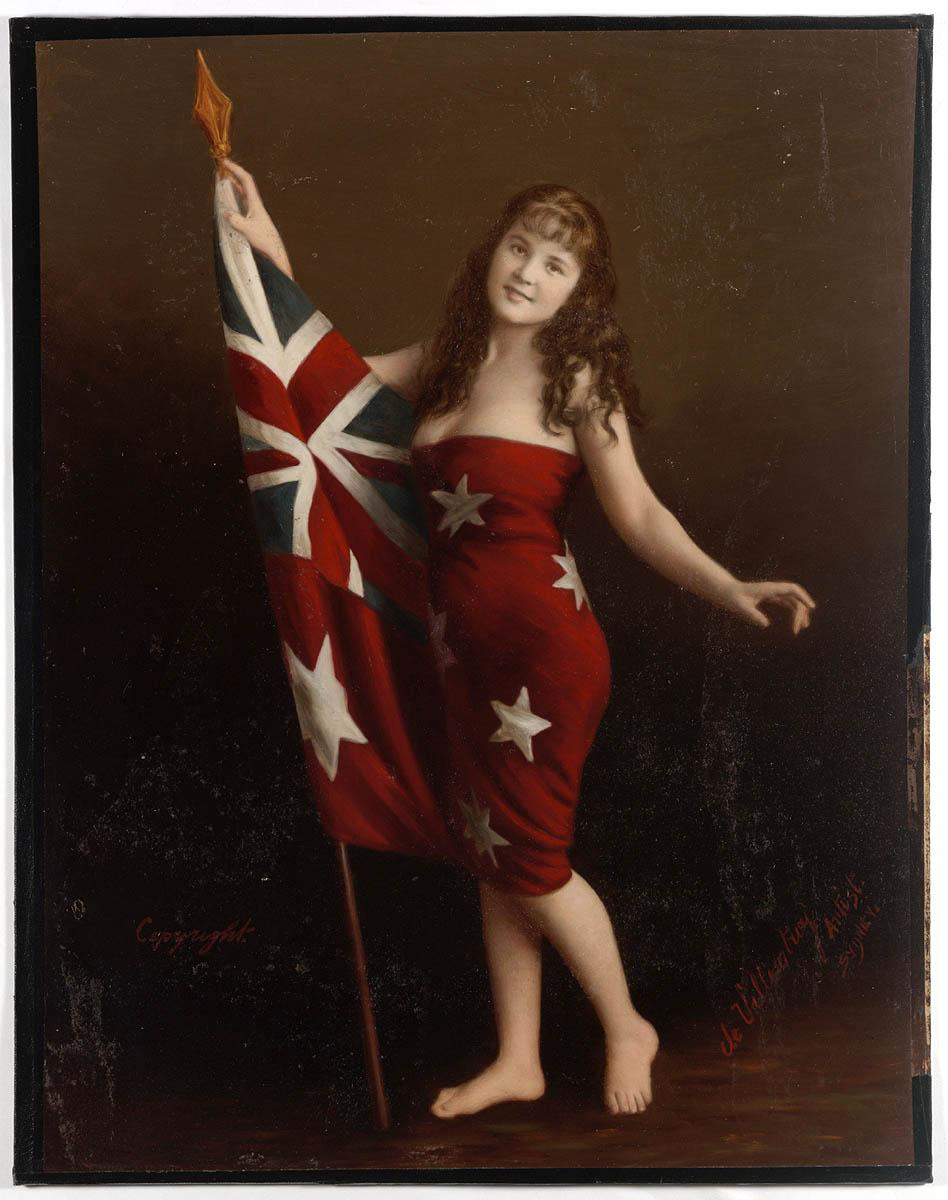
The Australian national flag and red ensign are common patriotic symbols of Australiana

Australiana is an expression referring to anything distinctive, symbolic or stereotypical of Australian culture, society, geography and ecology, especially if it is endemic to Australia or has reached iconic status, and refers also to the collecting and collections of such characteristic materials. It includes the people and their spoken accent, places, flora, fauna, and events of Australian history and their two- or three-dimensional images.

Documents and realia identified as Australiana become collectable and comprise anything made in Australia or especially made for Australian use. Australiana often borrows from Australian First Nations' cultures, or features stereotypes of white Australian settler and pioneer culture. It attaches to Australian identity in representing a nationalist ethos or sentiment.

Artefacts collectable as Australiana include furniture, pottery, glass, bottles, printed materials, metal and wooden objects, fabrics and aboriginal collectables. They may range from elaborate antiques such as engraved and/or silver-decorated emu eggs, to primitive or rural decorative arts, folk crafts, and make-do and improvised objects. Objects can be generically Australian, such as boomerangs, Akubra hats, and didgeridoos, or can be common objects with Australian cultural images displayed on them.

Australiana may also refer to art with an Australian style or subject, including paintings, ceramics, crafts and coins that depict Australian imagery. Certain Australiana has become cliché, or is considered kitsch.

== Collections ==
Public Australiana collections are found in the state and national libraries and museums, and in university and government institutions.

The National Library of Australia holds specific collections of Australiana, including the Nan Kivell Collection.

The National Museum of Australia houses numbers of Australiana collections including the Terence Lane kangaroo collection, and that of Trevor Kennedy, begun as a private museum.

The Powerhouse Museum collections include Australiana amongst its international artefacts of scientific and technological interest, and holds exhibitions of Australian popular culture.

The State Library of New South Wales incorporates the Mitchell Library, founded on the efforts of its namesake, a collector of Australian print publications, and it houses the Sir William Dixson collections of books, maps, paintings, stamps, coins and manuscripts in the Sir William Dixson Collection, the Dixson Galleries (created in 1929) and the Dixson Library (1959).

The State Library of Victoria indexes its collections of ephemera, realia, and letters, newspapers, journals and books, to assist access to Australiana.

The University of Melbourne holds the Russell and Mab Grimwade Collection in the Potter Museum of Art, the Baillieu Library and University Archives.

Julie & Andrew Carter's Australiana Ceramics Collection is found in the Canberra Museum and Art Gallery, Canberra

== Organisations ==
=== The Australiana Society ===
A national body The Australiana Society, an incorporated organisation based in Sydney, and with representatives on its board of directors from each state and territory, proclaims as its remit to "collect, study and preserve" Australiana: "art, decorative arts, antiques, historic items, collectables, buildings and sites, and portable heritage made in, or relating to, Australia." It publishes a quarterly magazine, Australiana, and in partnership with the Powerhouse Museum, Sydney, where it was founded, the Society awards to a collector the Powerhouse Prize for Australiana.

=== Ephemera Society of Australia ===
Members of the incorporated Ephemera Society of Australia, founded in 1987, are devoted to the collection and preservation of common but transitory printed material such as labels, flyers and pamphlets, though the definition of ephemera has since expanded to contemporary material including zines and video. It publishes the Ephemera Journal of Australia.

== International recognition ==
Australiana has become familiar or even iconic internationally through its export of cinema, television, visual and audio arts, travel industry promotions and publications, and through souvenirs sold to international, and interstate, tourists, such as snow globes or tea towels with Australian scenery or icons imprinted on them, or featuring the national colours of Australia (green and gold) derived from the nation's floral emblem, the Golden Wattle. Many iconic creatures or objects are represented as 'Big Thngs', novelty sculptures, which began in the mid-1960s with the Big Banana in Coffs Harbour, and which become tourist attractions.

== Subjects ==
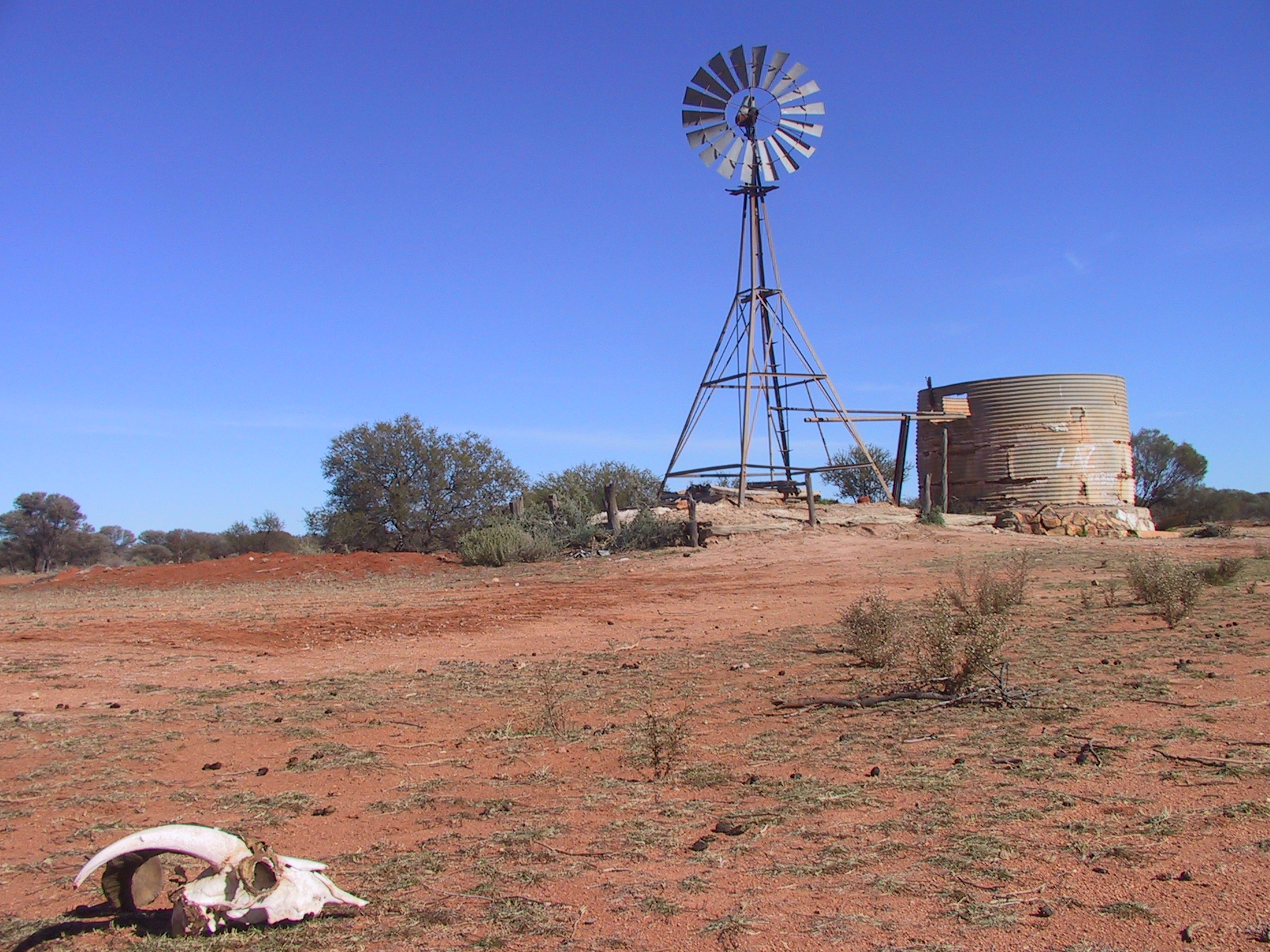
Symbolism of the Outback way of life is common in Australiana

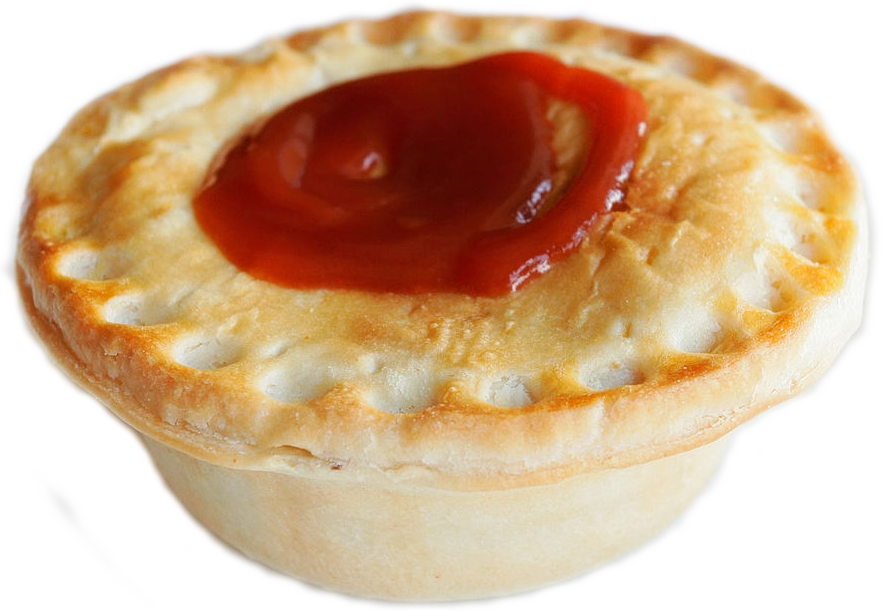
A typical Australian meat pie with tomato sauce

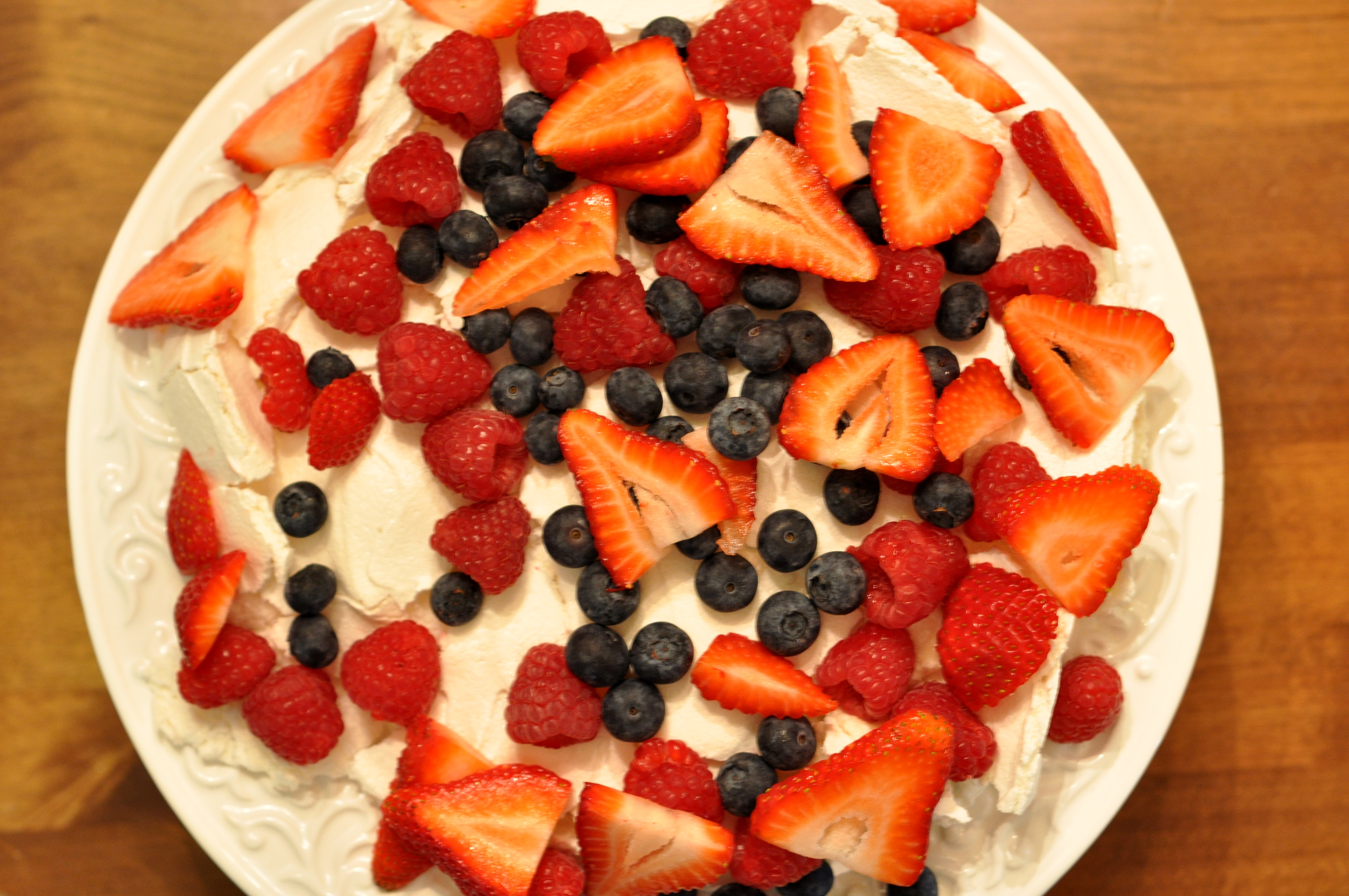
Although its country of origin is a contentious issue, the pavlova is a part of the Australian identity.

People depicted in such artwork; Australian explorers, drovers, bushrangers, swagmen, Aboriginal Australians, diggers, stockmen, personify Australiana. Thus Surf Life Savers become symbolic of the nation's beach culture resulting from Australian populations being concentrated in regions on or near the coast, around the largely dry inland.

Australiana includes commercial products and brands which due to marketing, their endemic origins, or the mythology or nostalgia attaching to them, evoke "Australianness". Advertisements and posters depicting these brands often develop value as Australiana as well. The following themes are examples of Australiana:

=== Aboriginal culture ===
- Boomerang
- Bush tucker
- Didgeridoo
- Dreamtime

=== Animals ===
- Australian Cattle Dog
- Australian feral camel
- Budgerigar
- Cassowary
- Dingo
- Echidna
- Emu
- Frill-necked lizard
- Kangaroo
- Koala
- Kookaburra
- Numbat
- Platypus
- Quokka
- Rainbow lorikeet
- Saltwater crocodile
- Sulphur-crested cockatoo
- Tasmanian devil
- Tasmanian tiger Famous for being unique and hunted to extinction.
- Wallaby
- Wombat

=== Businesses ===
- Bunnings
- Coles
- Harvey Norman
- Holden
- Kirks
- Milk bars
- Myer
- Qantas
- Woolworths

=== Clothing ===
- Akubra hats are a staple of country people but are also seen in cities at election time on the heads of Australian politicians. Les Hiddins also known as The Bush Tucker Man was famous for the unique shape of his akubra hat.
- Driza-Bone coats were popularized in the movie The Man From Snowy River which showed groups of men on horseback wearing long Driza-Bone coats chasing after brumbies in the Victorian Alps.
- RM Williams boots
- Speedos, colloquially known as Budgie smugglers, are swim briefs that have been brought to attention of the Australian public through images of surf life savers, Australian men and women swimmers at the Olympic Games and more recently the then prime minister Tony Abbott who was photographed wearing them.
- Ugg boots made simply from sheep skin and worn from the 1800s. The most recent version created by Australian surfer Brian Smith to keep his feet warm, and worn all over the world by Australians in the 1970's. Brought to notice by the enforcement of trademark disputes to prevent the generic use of the term.

=== Food ===
- Anzac biscuits
- Arnott's Biscuits
- Chicken salt
- Chiko Roll
- Damper
- Dim sim Chinese-inspired dumpling
- Fairy bread
- Lamingtons
- Meat pie evokes memories of school tuck shops and football matches, with the best known being Four'N Twenty Pies
- Milo
- Minties
- Peters Ice Cream
- Rosella soup
- Sausage sizzle
- Bundaberg
- Tim Tam
- Vegemite
- Victoria Bitter
- Weet-Bix
- XXXX beer, associated with the joke "Why do Queenslanders call their beer XXXX? Because they can't spell beer!"

=== Music ===
- My Island Home by Warumpi Band
- Treaty by Yothu Yindi
- Solid Rock by Goanna
- Advance Australia Fair
- I Am Australian
- Pub rock (Australia)
- Waltzing Matilda
- I Still Call Australia Home
- Down Under by Men At Work
- Sounds of Then (This Is Australia) by GANGgajang
- The Horses by Daryl Braithwaite
- You're the Voice by John Farnham
- Great Southern Land by ICEHOUSE
- Beds Are Burning by Midnight Oil
- Working Class Man by Jimmy Barnes
- A Pub with No Beer by Slim Dusty

=== People ===
- Ron Barassi
- Don Bradman
- Hector Crawford
- Slim Dusty
- Cathy Freeman
- Reg Grundy
- Bob Hawke
- Chris Hemsworth
- Paul Hogan
- John Howard
- Barry Humphries
- Steve Irwin
- Hugh Jackman
- Ned Kelly
- Graham Kennedy
- Wally Lewis
- Ray Martin
- Leigh Matthews
- Jessica Mauboy
- Kylie Minogue
- Rupert Murdoch
- Bert Newton
- Greg Norman
- Kerry Packer
- Margot Robbie
- Shane Warne

=== Places ===
- Anzac Cove located in the Gallipoli peninsula is associated with the World War I campaign known as Gallipoli. The place was the scene of large loss of life on both sides when Australian and New Zealand troops and allies stormed the beaches. The event was a culturally defining moment. Current Anzac Day ceremonies have renewed interest with dawn ceremonies held at Anzac Cove accompanied with playing of the last post.
- Daintree Rainforest
- Fraser Island
- Great Barrier Reef
- Kakadu National Park
- Melbourne Cricket Ground
- Parliament House, Canberra
- Sovereign Hill
- Sydney Harbour Bridge
- Sydney Opera House
- Uluru

=== Products ===
- Aerogard
- Esky
- Hills Hoist
- Mortein
- Opals
- Victa lawn mowers
- 19th Century cedar furniture

=== Publications ===
A range of magazines, contemporary and historical, specialise in and promote Australiana and 'Australianness', and are in themselves collectible.

- Afloat
- Annals Australasia
- Aurealis
- Australasian Post
- Australia's Surfing Life
- Australian Art
- Australian Book Review
- The Australian Journal
- Australian Literary Review
- The Australian Magazine
- The Australian Women's Weekly
- Blue's Country Magazine
- The Bulletin
- Cleo
- Dolly
- Girlfriend
- Gourmet Traveller
- GQ Australia
- The Home
- The Illustrated Australian News
- The Lone Hand
- The Monthly
- New Idea
- Our Rural Magazine
- Oz
- Pacific Islands Monthly
- POL
- PIX
- Qantas The Australian Way
- Quadrant
- Table Talk (magazine)
- Tracks
- Walkabout
- Wild Life
- Woman's Day

=== Sport ===
- Australian rules football
- Cricket
- Campdrafting
- Rugby league
- Rugby union
- State of Origin series

== See also ==
- Culture of Australia
- William Dixson — a collector of early Australiana
- David Scott Mitchell — a collector of early Australiana
- Canadiana — a similar concept in Canada
- Americana — a similar concept in the United States
- Kiwiana — a similar concept in New Zealand
- Africana — a similar concept in South Africa
- Floridiana — a similar concept in Florida
- Hawaiiana — a similar concept in Hawaii
