= Home Fires (album) =

Studio album by Dead Ringer Band
- Released: November 1995
- Venues: Beach House, Avoca Beach, NSW
- Genres: Country, Pop rock
- Length: 40:32
- Label: Massive Records

Dead Ringer Band chronology
Red Desert Sky (1993)	Home Fires (1995)	Living in the Circle (1997)

Home Fires is the second studio album by Australian country music band Dead Ringer Band. The album was released in November 1995.

At the ARIA Music Awards of 1996, the album won the ARIA Award for Best Country Album.

== Critical reception ==
In a review for AllMusic, music critic Thom Owens praised the band's performances and concise country-rock arrangements, although he considered the production somewhat overly polished. He highlighted "Honky Tonk from Hell", "I'd Go Home If I Had One" and the band's cover of "Sin City" as particularly successful tracks.

== Track listing ==
No.	Title	Writer(s)	Length
1.	"Home Fires"	Darren Coggan	3:12
2.	"More About Love" (also known as "That's More About Love Than I Wanted to Know")	Bucky Jones, Dickey Lee, Bob McDill	3:27
3.	"Always Be Me"	Kasey Chambers	3:35
4.	"Australian Son"	Bill Chambers, K. Chambers, Nash Chambers	2:19
5.	"Honky Tonk from Hell"	Pat Drummond	3:43
6.	"I'd Go Home if I Had One"	B. Chambers, N. Chambers, Vernon Rust	2:54
7.	"Why"	N. Chambers, Jodi Martin	3:26
8.	"Family Man"	B. Chambers, N. Chambers	3:32
9.	"Burning Flame"	N. Chambers	3:11
10.	"I Just Wanted To See You So Bad"	Lucinda Williams	2:34
11.	"Sin City"	Chris Hillman, Gram Parsons	2:52
12.	"Guitar Talk"	K. Chambers	2:07
13.	"Gypsy Bound"	K. Chambers	3:50

== Release history ==
Region	Date	Format	Label	Catalogue
Australia	November 1995	CD	Massive	7310752
