= List of number-one country albums of 2001 (Australia) =

ARIA Charts number-one country albums of 2001 < 2000 2002 >

Other Australian number-one charts of 2001
- albums
- singles
- dance singles

Top Australian singles and albums of 2001
- Triple J Hottest 100
- top 25 singles
- top 25 albums

These are the Australian Country number-one albums of 2001, per the ARIA Charts.

Issue date	Album	Artist
1 January	The Captain	Kasey Chambers
8 January	The Captain	Kasey Chambers
15 January	The Captain	Kasey Chambers
22 January	The Captain	Kasey Chambers
29 January	Wide Open Spaces	Dixie Chicks
5 February	The Winners 2001	Various Artists
12 February	The Winners 2001	Various Artists
19 February	The Winners 2001	Various Artists
26 February	Breathe	Faith Hill
5 March	Breathe	Faith Hill
12 March	Breathe	Faith Hill
19 March	Breathe	Faith Hill
26 March	Breathe	Faith Hill
2 April	Breathe	Faith Hill
9 April	Breathe	Faith Hill
16 April	Breathe	Faith Hill
23 April	Breathe	Faith Hill
30 April	Breathe	Faith Hill
7 May	Breathe	Faith Hill
14 May	Breathe	Faith Hill
21 May	Breathe	Faith Hill
28 May	Breathe	Faith Hill
4 June	Breathe	Faith Hill
11 June	Breathe	Faith Hill
18 June	Breathe	Faith Hill
25 June	Breathe	Faith Hill
2 July	Breathe	Faith Hill
9 July	Breathe	Faith Hill
16 July	Breathe	Faith Hill
23 July	Breathe	Faith Hill
30 July	Breathe	Faith Hill
6 August	Breathe	Faith Hill
13 August	Breathe	Faith Hill
20 August	Breathe	Faith Hill
27 August	Breathe	Faith Hill
3 September	Breathe	Faith Hill
10 September	Barricades & Brickwalls	Kasey Chambers
17 September	Barricades & Brickwalls	Kasey Chambers
24 September	Barricades & Brickwalls	Kasey Chambers
1 October	Barricades & Brickwalls	Kasey Chambers
8 October	Barricades & Brickwalls	Kasey Chambers
15 October	Barricades & Brickwalls	Kasey Chambers
22 October	Barricades & Brickwalls	Kasey Chambers
29 October	There You'll Be	Faith Hill
5 November	There You'll Be	Faith Hill
12 November	There You'll Be	Faith Hill
19 November	There You'll Be	Faith Hill
26 November	There You'll Be	Faith Hill
3 December	There You'll Be	Faith Hill
10 December	There You'll Be	Faith Hill
17 December	There You'll Be	Faith Hill
24 December	There You'll Be	Faith Hill
31 December	There You'll Be	Faith Hill

== See also ==
- 2001 in music
- List of number-one albums of 2001 (Australia)
