= If I Were You (Kasey Chambers song) =

2002 single by Kasey Chambers

Single by Kasey Chambers

from the album Barricades & Brickwalls
- B-side: "Nullarbor Song" (live); "Changed the Locks" (live); "Million Tears" (live)
- Released: 14 October 2002
- Length: 4:10
- Label: EMI Australia
- Songwriter: Kasey Chambers
- Producer: Nash Chambers

Kasey Chambers singles chronology
"Million Tears" (2002)	"If I Were You" (2002)	"True Colours" (2003)

"If I Were You" is a song by Australian country music singer-songwriter Kasey Chambers, produced by her brother Nash Chambers for her second studio album, Barricades & Brickwalls (2001). It was released as the album's fifth and final single on 14 October 2002, peaking at number 32 on the Australian Singles Chart.

== Track listing ==
Australian CD single

1. "If I Were You" – 4:10
2. "Nullarbor Song" (live) – 4:52
3. "Changed the Locks" (live) – 4:20
4. "Million Tears" (live) – 5:08
- Tracks two to four are taken from the DVD Kasey Chambers – Behind the Barricades.

== Charts ==
Chart (2002)	Peak position
Australia (ARIA)	32

== Release history ==
Region	Date	Format	Label	Ref.
Australia	14 October 2002	CD	EMI Australia	
United States	27 January 2003	Triple A radio	Warner Bros.	
