= Million Tears (Kasey Chambers song) =

2002 single by Kasey Chambers

Single by Kasey Chambers

from the album Barricades & Brickwalls
- Released: 3 June 2002
- Length: 4:17
- Label: EMI
- Songwriters: Kasey Chambers, Steven Mark Werchon
- Producer: Nash Chambers

Kasey Chambers singles chronology
"Not Pretty Enough" (2002)	"Million Tears" (2002)	"If I Were You" (2002)

"Million Tears" is a song written by Australian singer Kasey Chambers, produced by her brother Nash Chambers for her second album, Barricades & Brickwalls. It was released as the album's fourth single in June 2002 and peaked at number 32 in Australia.

== Track listing ==
1. "Million Tears" – 4:17
2. "Runaway Train" (live) – 3:28
3. "The Captain" (live acoustic version) – 5:06
4. "Not Pretty Enough" (live acoustic version) – 3:14

== Charts ==
Chart (2002)	Peak position
Australia (ARIA)	32
