= Living in the Circle =

Studio album by Dead Ringer Band
- Released: June 1997
- Venue: Beach House, Avoca Beach, NSW
- Genre: Country
- Length: 48:51
- Label: Massive Records
- Producer: Bill Chambers, Nash Chambers

Dead Ringer Band chronology
Home Fires (1995)	Living in the Circle (1997)	Hopeville (1998)

Living in the Circle is the third studio album by Australian country music band Dead Ringer Band. The album was released in June 1997 and became the band's first charting album, peaking at number 86 on the ARIA Charts.

At the ARIA Music Awards of 1997, the album was nominated for the ARIA Award for Best Country Album.

== Track listing ==
No.	Title	Writer(s)	Length
1.	"Too Confused"	Bill Chambers, Kasey Chambers	2:48
2.	"Living in the Circle"	Richard Porteous	2:13
3.	"Halfway to Sydney"	B. Chambers, Diane Chambers, K. Chambers, Nash Chambers	3:05
4.	"Things Don't Come Easy"	K. Chambers	4:26
5.	"That's What Makes a Broken Heart"	B. Chambers	2:31
6.	"The Last Generation"	K. Chambers, N. Chambers	4:03
7.	"If I Needed You"	Townes Van Zandt	3:17
8.	"Too Many Friends"	D. Rowe, J. Murphy	2:44
9.	"Life's Little Mysteries"	N. Chambers	3:18
10.	"Already Gone"	K. Chambers	4:00
11.	"Loop Around Atlanta"	Vernon Rust	3:47
12.	"No Depression"	A. P. Carter	3:02
13.	"Am I The Only One (Who's Ever Felt This Way)"	Maria McKee	2:39
14.	"Just Like Yesterday (Song For Gram)"	K. Chambers	3:57

== Charts ==
Chart (1997)	Peak position
Australian Albums (ARIA)	86

== Release history ==
Region	Date	Format	Label	Catalogue
Australia	June 1997	CD	Massive	7320762
