= Sunshine Day (Glaubitz & Roc song) =

- German Maxi single cover

Single by Glaubitz & Roc
- Released: 1999
- Length: 3:25
- Label: Peppermint Jam
- Songwriters: Mac Tontoh, Sol Amarfio, Teddy Osei
- Producers: Carsten Glaubitz, Oliver Rockstedt

"Sunshine Day" is the debut and only single by German duo Glaubitz & Roc. The song was released in 1999. A 2002 remix peaked at number 51 on the ARIA charts.

== Track listings ==
Main single (Peppermint Jam – PJMS0044)

1. "Sunshine Day" (Extended Version) - 6:47
2. "Sunshine Day" (Dubmix) - 5:58
3. "Sunshine Day" (Michi's Baggrabber Club Mix) - 7:13
4. "Sunshine Day" (Michi's Lick-A-Lot Dub) -5:37

Maxi single (2000)

1. "Sunshine Day" (Original Radio Edit) - 3:25
2. "Sunshine Day" (Phats & Small Radio Edit) - 2:35
3. "Sunshine Day" (Extended Version) - 6:48
4. "Sunshine Day" (Michi's Baggrabber Club) - 7:13
5. "Sunshine Day" (Phats & Small Mutant Disco Mix) - 6:15
6. "Sunshine Day" (DJ Pippi's Sunshine In Benirras Mix) -5:54
7. "Sunset" (Bossa Latin Jazz Mix By Glaubitz & Roc) - 5:56

2002 Remixes (TINT CD5 076)

1. "Sunshine Day" (Sgt Slick Radio Cut) - 3:48
2. "Sunshine Day" (Elroy's Messyespanola Radio Edit) - 3:40
3. "Sunshine Day" (Original Radio Version) 3:24
4. "Sunshine Day" (Michi's Baggrabber Club Mix). 7:12
5. "Sunshine Day" (Dub Mix)- 5:58
6. "Sunshine Day" (Sgt Slick 2002 Mix) - 7:50
7. "Sunshine Day" (Elroy's Messyespanola Mix) - 4:57

== Charts ==
Chart (2002)	Peak position
Australia (ARIA Charts)	51
Australia (ARIA Club Chart)	1

== See also ==
- List of number-one club tracks of 2002 (Australia)
