= The Messenger (Matt Joe Gow and the Dead Leaves album) =

Studio album by Matt Joe Gow
- Released: July 2009
- Recorded: Sing Sing Studios, Richmond, Victoria
- Genre: Alternative country
- Length: 40:00 (43:29 with bonus tracks)
- Label: Liberation Music
- Producer: Nash Chambers

Professional ratings
Review scores
Source	Rating
Waikato Times	5/5 stars
Otago Daily Times	4/5 stars
Nelson Mail	4/5 stars
The Sydney Morning Herald	3/5 stars
The New Zealand Herald	3/5 stars
The Dominion Post	3/5 stars
Australian Musician	(Favourable)
Blue's	(Favourable)
South Coast Register	(Favourable)
NZ Musician Magazine	(Favourable)
Beat Magazine	(Favourable)
Elsewhere.co.nz	(Favourable)

The Messenger is the debut album from Melbourne-based artist Matt Joe Gow, released in Australia on 18 July 2009.

Produced by Nash Chambers, the album features instrumental contributions from Jim Moginie of Midnight Oil and Bill Chambers as well as vocal contributions from Catherine Britt.

== Track listing ==
All tracks are written by Matt Joe Gow except Track 1, written by Grant-Lee Phillips.

No.	Title	Length
1.	"Come To Mama, She Say"	3:13
2.	"Come What May"	4:20
3.	"At The Bar"	3:15
4.	"The Light"	3:39
5.	"Steady Life"	3:36
6.	"Land is Burning"	4:22
7.	"Things Fall Apart"	4:13
8.	"At The Seams"	4:11
9.	"I Let You Be"	3:50
10.	"It's Not Hard"	3:36
11.	"Up on the Hill"	3:41

Bonus tracks
No.	Title	Length
1.	"Open Plains" (Released as an iTunes exclusive album-only track.)	3:29

== Performers ==
- Matt Joe Gow – Vocals, Acoustic and Electric Guitar, Harmonica, Percussion, piano
- Andrew Pollock – Electric Guitar, Vocals
- Kain Borlase – Bass guitar
- Chris Elliott – Drums
- James van Cuylenburg - Piano
- Jim Moginie – Electric Guitar, Hammond organ, Harmonium, Mandolin
- John Watson – Drums
- Michel Rose – Pedal Steel
- Mick Albreck – Fiddle
- Bill Chambers – Lap Steel
- Catherine Britt – Vocals on "At The Seams" and "Things Fall Apart"
