= In Your Eyes (Kylie Minogue song) =

2002 single by Kylie Minogue

- Cover of CD2 and digital download

Single by Kylie Minogue

from the album Fever
- B-side: "Tightrope"; "Good Like That"; "Harmony"; "Never Spoken"
- Released: 21 January 2002
- Studio: Biffco (Dublin, Ireland)
- Genre: Dance-pop
- Length: 3:18
- Label: Festival Mushroom (Australia); Parlophone (Europe)
- Songwriters: Kylie Minogue; Richard Stannard; Julian Gallagher; Ash Howes
- Producers: Richard Stannard; Julian Gallagher

Kylie Minogue singles chronology
"Can't Get You Out of My Head" (2001)	"In Your Eyes" (2002)	"Love at First Sight" (2002)

Music video
- "In Your Eyes" on YouTube

"In Your Eyes" is a song by Australian singer Kylie Minogue, taken from her eighth studio album, Fever (2001). It was written by Minogue, Richard Stannard, Julian Gallagher, and Ash Howes and produced by Stannard and Gallagher. It is a dance-pop song and talks about sexual temptation. The song was released in Australia on 21 January 2002 as the second single from the album. In Europe, it was delayed from a January release due to the continued success of "Can't Get You Out of My Head", and it was eventually issued on 18 February 2002 by Parlophone.

Critical reception towards "In Your Eyes" was highly positive, with its catchiness being noted and its production singled out for praise. In Australia, the song debuted at number one and was certified gold by the Australian Recording Industry Association (ARIA). It reached number three in the United Kingdom and was certified silver by the British Phonographic Industry (BPI). The single also charted inside the top 20 in Finland, Hungary, Canada, and New Zealand.

A music video for "In Your Eyes" was directed by Dawn Shadforth and was envisioned as a science fiction-extension from Minogue's previous single, "Can't Get You Out of My Head" (2001). It features Minogue and numerous backup dancers, surrounded by LED lights. "In Your Eyes" was performed on her 2002 Fever Tour and has appeared on most of her concert tours since, including the one-off concert show Money Can't Buy and most recently on the Tension Tour in 2025.

== Background and release ==
Kylie Minogue "In Your Eyes" (2002)
A 19 second sample of "In Your Eyes" containing part of the chorus of the song. The song contains a reference to Minogue's 2000 single "Spinning Around".

Following the success of Minogue's 2001 single, "Can't Get You Out of My Head", Minogue's label Parlophone were set to release the second single from the album Fever (2001). Minogue enlisted several writers and producers such as Richard Stannard, Julian Gallagher, and Ash Howes, all of whom worked with Minogue on her seventh album, Light Years (2000). All four of them, including Minogue, wrote "In Your Eyes" together, while Stannard and Gallagher handled the production of the song. After the major success of "Can't Get You Out of My Head", it was announced that "In Your Eyes" would be released as the album's second official single, set for a January 2002 release. However, due to the overwhelming success and radio airplay in Europe, the single was postponed there until February 2002.

In the first verse, Minogue's vocals span and range from F♯m-D-D-C♯-Bm. When it reaches the chorus, her vocals range from F♯m-Bm-C♯. The chords basically repeat with each verse it has. According to Popmatters and NME, the described the song as "another disco-sounding club track that lyrically propels Minogue further into a more sexual sound on the lyrics "I want to make it with you." Ian Wade from Yahoo! Music compared it to Minogue's song "Spinning Around". He said "'In Your Eyes' which cheekily references comeback hit 'Spinning Around'."

== Reception ==
=== Critical response ===
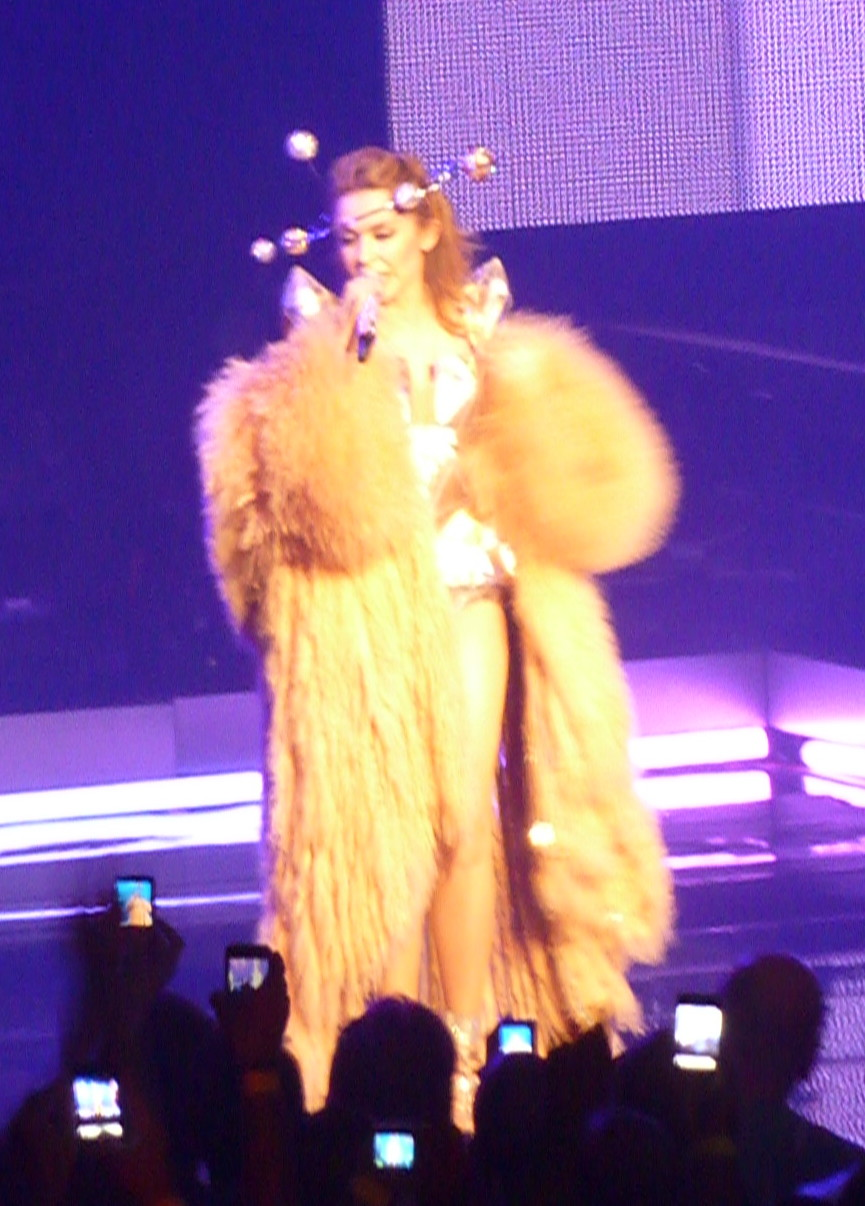
Minogue performing the song during her For You, For Me Tour, 2009

Sal Cinquemani from Slant Magazine called the song a "contagious club hit waiting to infect".

=== Chart performance ===
In Europe, "In Your Eyes" was released on 18 February 2002. It was originally scheduled for release in January but was delayed because of the airplay popularity of "Can't Get You Out of My Head". It debuted at number three on the UK Singles Chart, becoming her 22nd top-10 single. The song remained on the chart for 23 weeks. The single became a hit elsewhere in Europe, reaching the top five in the Czech Republic, Greece, Hungary, and Poland. "In Your Eyes" was released in Canada, where it peaked at number eleven, but not in the United States, where "Can't Get You Out of My Head" had just been released.

In Australia, "In Your Eyes" was released as scheduled on 21 January 2002. It debuted at number one on the ARIA singles chart and became the fourth single by Minogue to reach the top position since 2000, her eighth overall. The ARIA certified the song gold for shipments of over 35,000 units. It peaked at number 18 on Recording Industry Association of New Zealand (RIANZ) and stayed on the charts for 18 weeks.

== Music video ==
=== Background and synopsis ===
"In Your Eyes" featured a music video that was directed by Dawn Shadforth. The video features Minogue in a studio filled with colourful neon lights. There are two sequences; the first features Minogue and a group of dancers in front of a colourful background, the second is simply Minogue spinning before a background of flashing lights. Throughout the video, the two scenes are intercut and gradually fade.

The video featured an extension of the futuristic theme first introduced in the music video for "Can't Get You Out of My Head" the previous year. Minogue and her artistic director William Baker had become interested in the street interpretation of robotic, jerky movements and included this in the video. The costumes also represent this interest and were described by Baker as being a mix of "hip hop chic with sci-fi lunacy".

=== Reception ===
Released to music video channels prior to the single's commercial release, the video was a hit, charting at number one on MTV's Hit List UK and at number four on MTV Europe's top twenty countdown. The video was first released commercially as a DVD single in Australia in 2002 but was also included on the Ultimate Kylie companion DVD, released in December 2004.

== Live performances and usage in media ==
"In Your Eyes" was performed live for the first time on Saturday Night Live on 16 March 2002. The song was then included in the "Sex in Venice" section of KylieFever2002, where it was performed as a medley with a Latin version of itself, "Please Stay" and a chorus of "Rhythm of the Night" "In Your Eyes" was next performed in 2003 at Minogue's one-off, invitation-only gig Money Can't Buy to promote her ninth studio album Body Language. It was featured in the third act "Electro". "In Your Eyes" was performed as the second song of the show in both the Showgirl and Homecoming tours and was remixed for inclusion on KylieX2008 and For You, For Me, where it was included in the first section of both shows; this version of the song was also included on the set list for Kylie Summer 2015. The song was performed on the Aphrodite Tour in 2011 where it was performed in Japan only and as a request at a lot of dates; it was included in the rehearsal set list, after "Can't Get You Out of My Head", but was ultimately discarded from the main show. In 2018, the song was reworked and included in Minogue's headlining set for Radio 2 Live in Hyde Park, which was later included in Minogue's Golden Tour. This version of the song was combined with the version from KylieX2008 and was performed on Minogue's Summer 2019 tour. More recently, a new club reworking of the song, handled by longtime collaborators Steve Anderson and Richard Stannard, was included as the second song in the Infinite Disco live stream, launched in promotion of Minogue's fifteenth studio album Disco (2020).

The song was used in the 2020 thriller movie The Hater, directed by Jan Komasa, in the gay club scene with Maciej Stuhr and Maciej Musiałowski.

== Formats and track listings ==
Australian CD maxi-single 1

1. "In Your Eyes" – 3:18
2. "Never Spoken" – 3:19
3. "Harmony" – 4:16
4. "In Your Eyes" (The S Man's Release mix) – 7:32

Australian CD maxi-single 2

1. "In Your Eyes" – 3:18
2. "In Your Eyes" (Mr. Bishi mix) – 7:12
3. "In Your Eyes" (Jean Jacques Smoothie dub) – 6:20
4. "In Your Eyes" (Saeed & Palesh main mix) – 8:35

Australian limited-edition DVD single

1. "In Your Eyes" (video)
2. "Can't Get You Out of My Head" (video)
3. "In Your Eyes" (Roger Sanchez Release the Dub mix)
4. "Can't Get You Out of My Head" (Nick Faber mix)

Benelux and French 2-track CD single; UK cassette single

1. "In Your Eyes" – 3:18
2. "Tightrope" – 4:27

European and UK CD maxi-single 1

1. "In Your Eyes" – 3:18
2. "Tightrope" – 4:27
3. "Good Like That" – 3:33

European and UK CD maxi-single 2

1. "In Your Eyes" – 3:18
2. "In Your Eyes" (The S Man's Release mix) – 7:32
3. "In Your Eyes" (Jean Jacques Smoothie mix) – 6:21

UK 12-inch vinyl

A1. "In Your Eyes" (Saeed & Palesh main mix) – 8:34
B1. "In Your Eyes" (Powder's Spaced dub) – 7:25
B2. "In Your Eyes" (Roger Sanchez Release the Dub mix) – 7:15

Digital download

1. "In Your Eyes" (Jean Jacques Smoothie dub) – 6:20
2. "In Your Eyes" (Jean Jacques Smoothie mix) – 6:21
3. "In Your Eyes" (Knuckleheadz mix) – 6:46
4. "In Your Eyes" (live in Manchester) – 5:20
5. "In Your Eyes" (Mr. Bishi mix) – 7:12
6. "In Your Eyes" (Powder's dub) – 7:12
7. "In Your Eyes" (Powder's Spaced dub) – 7:25
8. "In Your Eyes" (Saeed & Palesh main mix) – 8:35
9. "In Your Eyes" (Saeed & Palesh Nightmare dub) – 8:35
10. "In Your Eyes" (The S Man's Release mix) – 7:32

== Personnel ==
Personnel are taken from the Australian CD1 liner notes.

- Lead vocals – Kylie Minogue
- Background vocals – Richard Stannard
- Writing – Kylie Minogue, Richard Stannard, Julian Gallagher, Ash Howes
- Producing – Richard "Biff" Stannard, Julian Gallagher
- Recording and programming – Ash Howes, Alvin Sweeney, Martin Harrington
- Mixing – Ash Howes at Biffco Studios
- Keyboards – Julian Gallagher
- Guitar – Martin Harrington
- Drums – Mimi Tachikawa
- Bass – Steve Lewinson
- Photography – Vincent Peters

== Charts ==
=== Weekly charts ===
2002 weekly chart performance for "In Your Eyes"
Chart (2002)	Peak position
Australia (ARIA)	1
Australian Dance (ARIA)	1
Austria (Ö3 Austria Top 40)	22
Belgium (Ultratop 50 Flanders)	18
Belgium (Ultratop 50 Wallonia)	11
Canada (Nielsen SoundScan)	11
Canada Radio (Nielsen BDS)	18
Canada AC (Nielsen BDS)	50
Canada CHR/Top 40 (Nielsen BDS)	13
Czech Republic (Rádio – Top 100)	2
Denmark (Tracklisten)	10
Eurochart Hot 100 (Music & Media)	7
Finland (Suomen virallinen lista)	7
France (SNEP)	24
Germany (GfK)	18
Greece (IFPI)	3
Hungary (MAHASZ)	1
Hungary (Single Top 40)	4
Ireland (IRMA)	6
Italy (FIMI)	7
Netherlands (Dutch Top 40)	14
Netherlands (Single Top 100)	15
New Zealand (Recorded Music NZ)	18
Poland Airplay (PiF PaF)	5
Quebec (ADISQ)	2
Romania (Romanian Top 100)	1
Russia Airplay (Music & Media)	2
Scottish Singles Sales (Official Charts)	3
Spain (Promusicae)	7
Sweden (Sverigetopplistan)	20
Switzerland (Schweizer Hitparade)	8
UK Singles (Official Charts)	3

2018–2025 weekly chart performance for "In Your Eyes"
Chart (2018–2015)	Peak position
Belarus Airplay (Eurofest)	175
Kazakhstan Airplay (TopHit)	37
Moldova Airplay (TopHit)	90

=== Monthly charts ===
2024 monthly chart performance for "In Your Eyes"
Chart (2024)	Peak position
Kazakhstan Airplay (TopHit)	43

=== Year-end charts ===
2002 year-end chart performance for "In Your Eyes"
Chart (2002)	Position
Australia (ARIA)	71
Belgium (Ultratop 50 Wallonia)	96
Canada (Nielsen SoundScan)	83
Eurochart Hot 100 (Music & Media)	78
Ireland (IRMA)	82
Italy (FIMI)	41
Netherlands (Dutch Top 40)	95
Switzerland (Schweizer Hitparade)	70
UK Singles (OCC)	60
UK Airplay (Music Week)	6

2024 year-end chart performance for "In Your Eyes"
Chart (2024)	Position
Kazakhstan Airplay (TopHit)	61

2025 year-end chart performance for "In Your Eyes"
Chart (2025)	Position
Kazakhstan Airplay (TopHit)	116

== Certifications ==
Certifications and sales for "In Your Eyes"
Region	Certification	Certified units/sales
Australia (ARIA)	Gold	35,000^{^}
France	—	47,739
United Kingdom (BPI)	Silver	200,000^{^}
^{^} Shipments figures based on certification alone.

== Release history ==
Release dates and formats for "In Your Eyes"
Region	Date	Format(s)	Label(s)	Ref.
Australia	21 January 2002	DVD; maxi CD (Note: "In Your Eyes" was made available in two maxi CD variants, with one including remixes alongside the original version, and the other including two B-sides.)	Festival Mushroom	
France	8 February 2002	Maxi CD	EMI	
Germany	18 February 2002	Maxi CD	EMI	
United Kingdom	18 February 2002	Cassette; maxi CD	Parlophone	
United Kingdom	25 February 2002	12-inch vinyl	Parlophone	
France	11 March 2002	CD	EMI	

== See also ==
- List of number-one singles in Australia in 2002
- List of number-one dance singles of 2002 (Australia)
- List of Romanian Top 100 number ones of the 2000s

== Cover versions ==
- Italian group Nossa Alma Canta covered the song in bossa nova style on the 2008 album I Was Made For Bossa.
- The song has been covered by Hong Kong singer Chet Lam, most notably during his live performances.
- The song was covered twice on a Polish version of Soapstar Superstar called Jak oni śpiewają by Agnieszka Włodarczyk and Laura Samojłowicz.
