= Audrey Auld-Mezera =

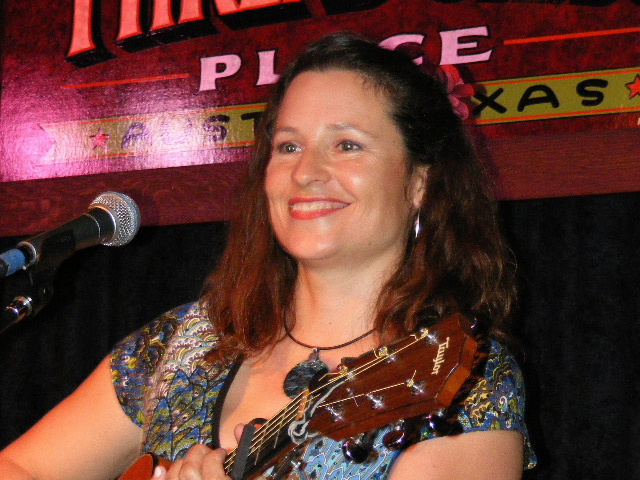
- Audrey Auld at Threadgill's in Austin, TX (2010)

Background information
- Born: Audrey Auld; 14 January 1964
- Origin: Hobart, Tasmania, Australia
- Died: 9 August 2015 (aged 51) Stinson Beach, California, USA
- Genres: Country
- Occupation: Singer-Songwriter
- Instrument: Guitar
- Label: Reckless Records
- Formerly of: Bill Chambers, Kieran Kane, Fred Eaglesmith, Mary Gauthier, Dale Watson, Kasey Chambers, and Carrie Rodriguez
- Website: www.audreyauld.com

Audrey Auld-Mezera (née Audrey Auld; 14 January 1964 – 9 August 2015) was an Australian American country music touring singer–songwriter. She had released eleven albums and three EPs on her own Reckless Records label, and had recorded with numerous musicians including Bill Chambers, Kieran Kane, Fred Eaglesmith, Mary Gauthier, Dale Watson, Kasey Chambers, and Carrie Rodriguez. She had songs recorded by various artists and songs appear on the FX TV shows Justified, Longmire, NCIS: New Orleans and The Good Guys. She hosted songwriting workshops with inmates in San Quentin Prison in California from 2007 till 2013.

Auld-Mezera died of cancer on 9 August 2015, aged 51.

== Discography ==
=== Studio albums ===
List of albums, with release date and label shown
| Title | Album details |
|---|---|
| Looking Back to See (with Bill Chambers) | Released: 1998; Format: CD; Label: Reckless Records (RECK001) |
| The Fallen | Released: 2000; Format: CD; Label: Reckless Records (RECK002) |
| Losing Faith | Released: May 2003; Format: CD; Label: Reckless Records (RECK004) |
| Texas | Released: 2004; Format: CD; Label: Reckless Records (RECK007) |
| Lost Men and Angry Girls | Released: 2006; Format: CD; Label: Reckless Records (RECK009) |
| Come Find Me | Released: 2011; Format: CD, DD; Label: Reckless Records (RECK011) |
| Resurrection Moon | Released: 2012; Format: CD, DD; Label: Reckless Records (RECK012) |
| Tonk | Released: 2013; Format: CD, DD; Label: Reckless Records (RECK014) |
| Hey Warden | Released: 2014; Format: CD, DD; Label: Reckless Records (RECK017) |

=== Compilation albums ===
List of albums, with release date and label shown
| Title | Album details |
|---|---|
| Reckless Records Garage Sale: 1997-2003 (by various artists]) | Released: 2003; Format: CD; Label: Reckless Records (RECK006); Note: 14 of the 19 tracks are performed by Auld-Mezera. |

=== Live albums ===
List of albums, with release date and label shown
| Title | Album details |
|---|---|
| In the House (with Nina Gerber) | Released: 2006; Format: CD; Label: Reckless Records; Note: Recorded in December 2005 |

=== Extended plays ===
List of EPs, with release date and label shown
| Title | EP details |
|---|---|
| Billabong Song | Released: 2009; Format: CD, DD; Label: Reckless Records (RECK0010) |
| Wood | Released: July 2012; Format: CD, DD; Label: Reckless Records |

== Awards and nominations ==
=== ARIA Music Awards ===
The ARIA Music Awards are a set of annual ceremonies presented by Australian Recording Industry Association (ARIA), which recognise excellence, innovation, and achievement across all genres of the music of Australia. They commenced in 1987.

| Year | Nominee / work | Award | Result |
|---|---|---|---|
| 2001 | The Fallen | Best Country Album | Nominated |
| 2005 | Texas | Best Country Album | Nominated |
