= Qantas The Australian Way =

Qantas The Australian Way is an Australian inflight magazine of Qantas. The magazine, based in Melbourne, was first published in 1986 under the name The Australian Way. It covers lifestyle topics. All content in the monthly magazine is published in English. The magazine ended a 14-year publishing deal with Bauer Media Group, switching its publisher to Medium Rare Content Agency from mid-2015.
