= Not Pretty Enough =

2002 single by Kasey Chambers

Single by Kasey Chambers

from the album Barricades & Brickwalls
- B-side: "These Days"; "Tear Stained Eyes"; "Too Long in the Wasteland"
- Released: 14 January 2002
- Length: 3:20
- Label: EMI
- Songwriter: Kasey Chambers
- Producer: Nash Chambers

Kasey Chambers singles chronology
"On a Bad Day" (2001)	"Not Pretty Enough" (2002)	"Million Tears" (2002)

"Not Pretty Enough" opening

"Not Pretty Enough" is a song by Australian country singer-songwriter Kasey Chambers, produced by her brother Nash Chambers for her second studio album, Barricades & Brickwalls (2001). It was released as the album's third single on 14 January 2002 in Australia as a CD single. It became a number-one hit in Australia the same year, and it also found success in New Zealand, where it reached number four. In the United States, it was serviced to adult album alternative radio in late January 2002.

The song was written by Chambers as a commentary on the reluctance of commercial radio stations towards playing her music, despite her being an established performer. However, the single prompted Chambers' commercial breakthrough and was most-added song to radio station playlists in 2002.

== Reception ==
In 2017, the song was selected for the National Film and Sound Archive's Sounds of Australia collection of historically and culturally important recordings.

Junkee said, "2009's The Loved Ones, a horror film about an obsessed stalker, put Kasey Chambers' hit in the mouth of its villain. But it wasn't subverting the song; it was just making the subtext into text. "Not Pretty Enough" is a ballad about over-stepping boundaries and weaponising self-hatred. The creepiness is already there. It's a gloriously uncomfortable tilt into the painful things about love."

== Track listing ==
No.	Title	Writer(s)	Length
1.	"Not Pretty Enough"	Kasey Chambers	3:23
2.	"These Days"	Powderfinger	5:16
3.	"Tear Stained Eyes"	Jay Farrar	4:08
4.	"Too Long in the Wasteland"	James McMurtry	4:44

== Charts ==
=== Weekly charts ===
Chart (2002)	Peak position
Australia (ARIA)	1
New Zealand (Recorded Music NZ)	4

=== Year-end charts ===
Chart (2002)	Position
Australia (ARIA)	7
New Zealand (RIANZ)	41

=== Decade-end charts ===
Chart (2000–2009)	Position
Australia (ARIA)	85
Australian Artist (ARIA)	14

== Certifications ==
Region	Certification	Certified units/sales
Australia (ARIA)	2× Platinum	140,000^{^}
^{^} Shipments figures based on certification alone.

== Release history ==
Region	Date	Format(s)	Label(s)	Ref.
Australia	14 January 2002	CD	EMI	
United States	28 January 2002	Triple A radio	Warner Bros.	
United States	12 August 2002	Contemporary hit; hot adult contemporary radio	Warner Bros.	
