= List of top 25 singles for 2002 in Australia =

Top 25 singles of 2002 < 2001 2003 >

Other Australian top charts for 2002
- top 25 albums
- Triple J Hottest 100

Australian number-one charts of 2002
- albums
- singles
- dance singles

The following lists the top 25 singles of 2002 in Australia from the Australian Recording Industry Association (ARIA) End of Year singles chart.

"Without Me" by Eminem was the biggest song of the year, peaking at #1 for five weeks and staying in the top 50 for 17 weeks. The longest stay at #1 was joint by Shakira with "Whenever, Wherever" which spent 6 weeks at the top spot, and it was joint by Avril Lavigne's "Complicated".

#	Title	Artist	Highest pos. reached	Weeks at No. 1
1.	"Without Me"	Eminem	1	5
2.	"Whenever, Wherever"	Shakira	1	6
3.	"The Ketchup Song"	Las Ketchup	1	3
4.	"Dilemma"	Nelly feat. Kelly Rowland	1	4
5.	"A Little Less Conversation"	Elvis Presley vs. JXL	1	4
6.	"A Thousand Miles"	Vanessa Carlton	1	2
7.	"Born to Try"	Delta Goodrem	1	1
8.	"Not Pretty Enough"	Kasey Chambers	1	4
9.	"Complicated"	Avril Lavigne	1	6
10.	"Kiss Kiss"	Holly Valance	1	1
11.	"Underneath Your Clothes"	Shakira	1	1
12.	"Murder on the Dancefloor"	Sophie Ellis-Bextor	3	
13.	"Lose Yourself"	Eminem	1	12
14.	"Hey Baby"	DJ Ötzi	1	4
15.	"Tribute"	Tenacious D	4	
16.	"The Tide Is High (Get the Feeling)"	Atomic Kitten	4	
17.	"Hot in Herre"	Nelly	3	
18.	"Hero"	Enrique Iglesias	1	2
19.	"If Tomorrow Never Comes"	Ronan Keating	3	
20.	"The Logical Song"	Scooter	1	2
21.	"Get Over You"	Sophie Ellis-Bextor	4	
22.	"Heaven"	DJ Sammy	4	
23.	"Sk8er Boi"	Avril Lavigne	3	
24.	"Superman (It's Not Easy)"	Five for Fighting	2	
25.	"Livin' It Up"	Ja Rule	6	
26.	"Girlfriend"	*NSYNC feat. Nelly	2	
27.	"Dirrty"	Christina Aguilera	4	
28.	"Insatiable"	Darren Hayes	3	
29.	"When You Look at Me"	Christina Milian	7	
30.	"Dance with Me"	112	2	
31.	"Better Man"	Robbie Williams	6	
32.	"Foolish"	Ashanti	6	
33.	"Creepin' Up Slowly"	Taxiride	6	
34.	"Just a Little"	Liberty X	4	
35.	"Get the Party Started"	Pink	1	2
36.	"Cleanin' Out My Closet"	Eminem	3	
37.	"Two Wrongs"	Wyclef Jean feat. Claudette Ortiz	5	
38.	"U Got It Bad"	Usher	3	
39.	"Life Goes On"	LeAnn Rimes	7	
40.	"Gangsta Lovin'"	Eve feat. Alicia Keys	4	
41.	"Objection (Tango)"	Shakira	2	
42.	"Do it With Madonna"	The Androids	4	
43.	"Stop Calling Me"	Shakaya	5	
44.	"Escape"	Enrique Iglesias	7	
45.	"Wherever You Will Go"	The Calling	5	
46.	"In the End"	Linkin Park	4	
47.	"Hey Baby"	No Doubt	7	
48.	"Don't Turn Off the Lights"	Enrique Iglesias	8	
49.	"What's Luv?"	Fat Joe	4	
50.	"Rich Girl"	Selwyn	9	
51.	"Like I Love You"	Justin Timberlake	8	
52.	"By the Way"	Red Hot Chili Peppers	6	
53.	"Down Boy"	Holly Valance	3	
54.	"Boys of Summer"	DJ Sammy	9	
55.	"Cherry Lips"	Garbage	7	
56.	"Papa Don't Preach"	Kelly Osbourne	3	
57.	"Jenny From the Block"	Jennifer Lopez	5	
58.	"Somethin' Stupid"	Robbie Williams and Nicole Kidman	8	
59.	"I Need a Girl (Part One)"	P. Diddy	5	
60.	"Always on Time"	Ja Rule	3	
61.	"I'm Moving On"	Scott Cain	1	1
62.	"Rapture"	iiO	3	
63.	"What's Your Flava?"	Craig David	10	
64.	"Hands Clean"	Alanis Morissette	9	
65.	"Hella Good"	No Doubt	8	
66.	"What About Us?"	Brandy	6	
67.	"Love at First Sight"	Kylie Minogue	3	
68.	"BareNaked"	Jennifer Love Hewitt	6	
69.	"Beautiful"	Disco Montego feat. Katie Underwood	9	
70.	"I Love Rock 'n' Roll"	Britney Spears	13	
71.	"In Your Eyes"	Kylie Minogue	1	1
72.	"Don't Let Me Get Me"	Pink	8	
73.	"I'm Not a Girl, Not Yet a Woman"	Britney Spears	7	
74.	"All Seats Taken"	Bec Cartwright	10	
75.	"One Day in Your Life"	Anastacia	6	
76.	"I'm Real"	Jennifer Lopez	3	
77.	"Lifestyles of the Rich and Famous"	Good Charlotte	17	
78.	"Batter Up"	St. Lunatics	19	
79.	"My Neck, My Back"	khia	12	
80.	"My Sacrifice"	Creed	11	
81.	"Hey Sexy Lady"	Shaggy feat. Brian and Tony Gold	4	
82.	"Die Another Day"	Madonna	5	
83.	"Hero"	Chad Kroeger feat. Josey Scott	17	
84.	"Inside Outside"	Sophie Monk	5	
85.	"I'm Gonna Be Alright"	Jennifer Lopez	16	
86.	"The Greatest View"	Silverchair	3	
87.	"Everywhere"	Michelle Branch	19	
88.	"Crying at the Discoteque"	Alcazar	14	
89.	"Gotta Get Thru This"	Daniel Bedingfield	10	
90.	"It Just Won't Do"	Tim Deluxe	13	
91.	"Family Affair"	Mary J. Blige	8	
92.	"All You Wanted"	Michelle Branch	25	
93.	"How You Remind Me"	Nickelback	2	
94.	"Ain't It Funny" (Remix)	Jennifer Lopez feat. Ja Rule	9	
95.	"Round Round"	Sugababes	13	
96.	"Alive"	P.O.D.	18	
97.	"Way Love's Supposed to Be"	Selwyn	9	
98.	"Black Suits Comin' (Nod Ya Head)"	Will Smith intr. Tra-Knox	18	
99.	"Nasty Girl"	Destiny's Child	10	
100.	"Break Ya Neck"	Busta Rhymes	13	
