= Dead Ringer Band =

Australian country music band

- Genres: Country
- Years active: 1986 - 1998
- Members: Kasey Chambers; Bill Chambers; Nash Chambers; Diane Chambers

Dead Ringer Band were an Australian family country music band. They are best known for their ARIA Award-winning album Home Fires which won the Best Country Album at the ARIA Music Awards of 1996.

== Background and formation ==
Dead Ringer Band had its roots in the husband and wife team of Bill and Diane Chambers. Shortly after the birth of their second child Kasey in 1976, and with their three-year-old son Nash, the family moved to central Australia's Nullarbor Plain. The Chambers earned a living by hunting and trapping rabbits and foxes that raided Nullarbor poultry farms, then selling the pelts. The Chambers home-schooled Nash and Kasey, and taught them American folk and country music by the Carter Family, Jimmy Rogers, Hank Williams, Townes Van Zandt and Gram Parsons, as well as Australian country artists, Slim Dusty, Buddy Williams and Tex Morton. In 1986 the family moved to Southend, located on the southern coast of Australia, and they began playing as a band at local public houses.

The quartet, initially billed under Bill's name, released two albums, Sea Eagle in 1987 and Kindred Spirit in 1991, before changing their name to Dead Ringer Band with teenager, Kasey as the group's lead singer. During those years, the Chambers family lived a nomadic lifestyle.

== Commercial releases ==
In 1992 Dead Ringer Band self-released their debut extended play, A Matter of Time. In November 1993, the band released a debut album, Red Desert Sky, which included 17-year-old Kasey's first recorded song writing effort. At that time, Bill provided lead guitars, Diane on bass guitar, Nash on rhythm guitar and harmony vocals, and Kasey on rhythm guitar and lead vocals. At the Country Music Association Awards of 1995, the group won the award for Vocal Group or Duo of the Year with their song, "Family Man".

The band's second studio album, Home Fires, was released in 1995, which featured the single, "Australian Son", which spent seven weeks on the country charts. At the ARIA Music Awards of 1996, the band won Best Country Album for Home Fires.

In 1997, the band's third studio album, Living in the Circle, was released and became the band's first charting release. Geoffrey Himes observed that it, "makes it clear that Kasey was the Dead Ringer Band's most valuable asset. At 21, her voice had blossomed into the dramatic instrument it is today. And her songwriting—especially on 'Things Don't Come Easy', 'The Last Generation' and 'Already Gone' had found the simple, emotionally naked approach that proved the perfect vehicle for her voice". At the ARIA Music Awards of 1997, the album was nominated for Best Country Album.

Contractually obligated to provide another album for their label, Massive Records, the Dead Ringer Band released, Hopeville, in 1998 consisting entirely of songs by other writers. Following Hopeville, Bill and Diane Chambers separated and subsequently divorced, and the Dead Ringer Band broke up. Dead Ringer Band's contract with EMI Australia that included a solo contract for Kasey.

== Band members ==
- Bill Chambers (lead guitars)
- Diane Chambers (bass guitars)
- Nash Chambers (rhythm guitar and harmony vocals)
- Kasey Chambers (rhythm guitar and vocals)

== Discography ==
=== Studio albums ===
List of studio albums, with selected chart positions
| Title | Album details | Peak chart positions |
| Title | Album details | AUS |
|---|---|---|
| Red Desert Sky | Released: November 1993; Label: Larrikin Entertainment; Formats: CD | - |
| Home Fires | Released: November 1995; Label: Massive (7310752); Formats: CD | - |
| Living in the Circle | Released: June 1997; Label: Massive (7320762); Formats: CD | 86 |
| Hopeville | Released: October 1998; Label: Massive (7321962); Formats: CD | - |

=== Compilation albums ===
List of compilation albums, with selected details
| Title | Album details |
|---|---|
| Till Now - The Very Best of | Released: 2000; Label: Massive (7322882); Formats: CD |
| The Very Best of...So Far | Released: 2002; Label: Essence/EMI Music (543908); Formats: CD |

=== Extended plays ===
List of extended plays, with selected details
| Title | EP details |
|---|---|
| A Matter of Time | Released: 1992; Label: Dead Ringer Band; Formats: CD |

== Awards ==
=== ARIA Music Awards ===
The ARIA Music Awards are an annual awards ceremony that recognises excellence, innovation, and achievement across all genres of Australian music. Dead Ringer Band won one awards from two nominations.

| Year | Nominee / work | Award | Result |
|---|---|---|---|
| 1996 | Home Fires | Best Country Album | Won |
| 1997 | Living in the Circle | Best Country Album | Nominated |

=== CMAA Awards ===
The CMAA Country Music Awards of Australia also known as the Golden Guitar Awards is an annual awards night held in January during the Tamworth Country Music Festival, in Tamworth, New South Wales, celebrating recording excellence in the Australian country music industry. Dead Ringer Band have won four awards.

| Year | Nominee / work | Award | Result |
|---|---|---|---|
| 1995 | "Family Man" | Vocal Group or Duo of the Year | Won |
| 1998 | "Living in the Circle" | APRA Song of the Year | Won |
| 1998 | "Living in the Circle" | Vocal Group or Duo of the Year | Won |
| 1999 | "Saddle Boy" | Vocal Group or Duo of the Year | Won |

=== Mo Awards ===
The Australian Entertainment Mo Awards (commonly known informally as the Mo Awards), were annual Australian entertainment industry awards. They recognise achievements in live entertainment in Australia from 1975 to 2016. Dead Ringer Band won five awards in that time.

| Year | Nominee / work | Award | Result (wins only) |
|---|---|---|---|
| 1995 | Dead Ringer Band | Country Group of the Year | Won |
| 1996 | Dead Ringer Band | Country Group of the Year | Won |
| 1997 | Dead Ringer Band | Country Group of the Year | Won |
| 1998 | Dead Ringer Band | Country Group of the Year | Won |
| 1999 | Dead Ringer Band | Country Group of the Year | Won |
