= Matt Joe Gow =

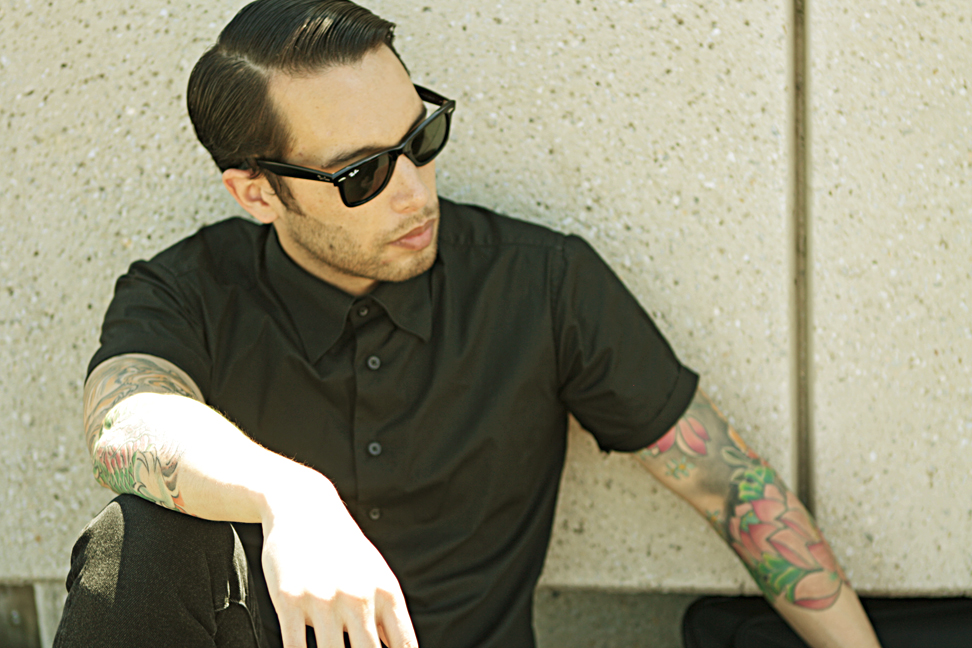
- Matt Joe Gow

Background information
- Born: Matt Joe Gow
- Origin: New Zealand
- Genres: Americana; Rock; Blues; Country
- Occupations: Singer-songwriter, Producer
- Instruments: guitar, piano, harmonica, drums
- Years active: 2009–present
- Labels: Liberation Music, Checked Label Services
- Website: http://www.mattjoegowmusic.com

Matt Joe Gow (born in Auckland, New Zealand) is a musician, songwriter, producer and the lead singer and frontman of Australian Americana band Matt Joe Gow & The Dead Leaves. Joe Gow released his debut album The Messenger (Matt Joe Gow and the Dead Leaves album) through Liberation Music to critical acclaim. His follow up album Seven Years released in 2016 was nominated for a Victoria Music Award for Best Country Album and his third solo album, the self produced Break Rattle And Roll released in October 2018 won the award for Best Country Album. His follow up Between Tonight & Tomorrow released in 2023 also won the Music Victoria Award and laid the foundation for his first nomination for an Aotearoa Music Award, establishing him as a mainstay on the alternative country music scene in both countries.

Joe Gow's musical style is influenced by folk, blues, and soulful rock while being firmly rooted in country. He is often referred to as an Americana or Alt. Country artist.

== Discography ==
=== Studio albums ===
List of albums, with selected details
Title	Details	Peak chart positions
Title	Details	AUS Country
The Messenger (with The Dead Leaves)	Released: 2009; Format: CD, Digital; Label: Liberation Music (LMCD0049)	—
Cities On the Sea (As The Dead Leaves)	Released: 2011; Format: CD, Digital; Label: Liberation Music (LMCD0146)	—
Seven Years	Released: 2016; Format: CD, Digital; Label: Checked Label Services	—
Break, Rattle and Roll	Released: 2018; Format: CD, Digital; Label: Checked Label Services	—
Between Tonight & Tomorrow	Released: 2023; Format: Vinyl, CD, Digital; Label: Checked Label Services	38

=== EPs, Collaborations and Live Albums ===
Title	Details	Peak chart positions
Title	Details	AUS Country
Closer To Tomorrow EP	Released: 2023; Format: Digital; Label: Oily Rag Records	-
The Woodshed Sessions (Live Album)	Released 2024; Format: CD, Digital; Label: Oily Rag Records	-
I Remember You (with Kerryn Fields)	Released 2024; Format: Vinyl, CD, Digital; Label: Oily Rag Records	-

== Awards and nominations ==
=== Music Victoria Awards ===
The Music Victoria Awards are an annual awards night celebrating Victorian music. They commenced in 2006.

Year	Nominee / work	Award	Result	Ref.
2016	Seven Years	Best Country Album	Nominated	
2019	Break, Rattle and Roll	Best Country Album	Won	
2023	Between Tonight & Tomorrow	Best Country Work	Won	
2024	Matt Joe Gow (with Kerryn Fields)	Best Country Work	Nominated	

=== New Zealand Country Honours ===
The Country Music Honours (formerly named the New Zealand Country Music Awards) are presented by the NZ Songwriter's Trust in association with the Mataura Licensing Trust and APRA Music. The Awards are hosted as part of Tussock Country, New Zealand's annual ten day celebration of Country Music.

Year	Nominee / work	Award	Result	Ref.
2023	Whirlwind	Matura Licensing Trust Songwriting	Won	

=== Aotearoa Music Awards ===
The Aotearoa Music Awards honour outstanding artistic achievements in the recording industry. The awards are among the most significant that a group or artist can receive in New Zealand music.

Year	Nominee / work	Award	Result	Ref.
2024	Matt Joe Gow	Best Country Artist	Nominated	

=== Australian Folk Music Awards ===
The Australian Folk Music Awards (AFMAs) celebrate artists and community projects within the Australian folk music scene.

Year	Nominee / work	Award	Result	Ref.
2024	Matt Joe Gow	Artist Of The Year (Duo)	Nominated	
