= List of number-one dance singles of 2002 (Australia) =

ARIA Charts number-one dance singles of 2002 < 2001 2003 >

Other Australian number-one charts of 2002
- albums
- singles

Top Australian singles and albums of 2002
- Triple J Hottest 100
- top 25 singles
- top 25 albums

The ARIA Dance Chart is a chart that ranks the best-performing dance singles of Australia. It is published by Australian Recording Industry Association (ARIA), an organisation who collect music data for the weekly ARIA Charts. To be eligible to appear on the chart, the recording must be a single, and be "predominantly of a dance nature, or with a featured track of a dance nature, or included in the ARIA Club Chart or a comparable overseas chart".

In 2002, eleven singles topped the chart. "The Ketchup Song (Aserejé)" by Las Ketchup had the longest-running chart-topping dance single of 2002, for twelve consecutive weeks. Kylie Minogue and Sophie Ellis-Bextor had two songs reach the apex of the Dance chart, more than any other artist with "In Your Eyes" and "Love at First Sight" by Minogue, and "Murder on the Dancefloor" and "Get Over You" for Ellis-Bextor. Other chart-topping dance singles from 2002 include Ellis-Bextor's "Murder on the Dancefloor" and Elvis Presley vs. JXL's "A Little Less Conversation", which spent eleven and nine weeks atop the charts, respectively.

== Chart history ==
Key
†	Indicates number-one dance single of 2002

Issue date	Song	Artist(s)	Reference
7 January	"Rapture"	iiO	
14 January	"Rapture"	iiO	
21 January	"Rapture"	iiO	
28 January	"In Your Eyes"	Kylie Minogue	
4 February	"In Your Eyes"	Kylie Minogue	
11 February	"In Your Eyes"	Kylie Minogue	
18 February	"Crying at the Discoteque"	Alcazar	
25 February	"Murder on the Dancefloor"	Sophie Ellis-Bextor	
4 March	"Murder on the Dancefloor"	Sophie Ellis-Bextor	
11 March	"Murder on the Dancefloor"	Sophie Ellis-Bextor	
18 March	"Murder on the Dancefloor"	Sophie Ellis-Bextor	
25 March	"Murder on the Dancefloor"	Sophie Ellis-Bextor	
1 April	"Murder on the Dancefloor"	Sophie Ellis-Bextor	
8 April	"Murder on the Dancefloor"	Sophie Ellis-Bextor	
15 April	"Murder on the Dancefloor"	Sophie Ellis-Bextor	
22 April	"Murder on the Dancefloor"	Sophie Ellis-Bextor	
29 April	"Murder on the Dancefloor"	Sophie Ellis-Bextor	
6 May	"Murder on the Dancefloor"	Sophie Ellis-Bextor	
13 May	"Beautiful"	Disco Montego featuring Katie Underwood	
20 May	"Beautiful"	Disco Montego featuring Katie Underwood	
27 May	"Beautiful"	Disco Montego featuring Katie Underwood	
3 June	"Beautiful"	Disco Montego featuring Katie Underwood	
10 June	"Love at First Sight"	Kylie Minogue	
17 June	"Love at First Sight"	Kylie Minogue	
24 June	"A Little Less Conversation" †	Elvis Presley vs. JXL	
1 July	"A Little Less Conversation" †	Elvis Presley vs. JXL	
8 July	"A Little Less Conversation" †	Elvis Presley vs. JXL	
15 July	"A Little Less Conversation" †	Elvis Presley vs. JXL	
22 July	"A Little Less Conversation" †	Elvis Presley vs. JXL	
29 July	"A Little Less Conversation" †	Elvis Presley vs. JXL	
5 August	"A Little Less Conversation" †	Elvis Presley vs. JXL	
12 August	"A Little Less Conversation" †	Elvis Presley vs. JXL	
19 August	"A Little Less Conversation" †	Elvis Presley vs. JXL	
26 August	"Get Over You"	Sophie Ellis-Bextor	
2 September	"Heaven"	DJ Sammy and Yanou featuring Do	
9 September	"Heaven"	DJ Sammy and Yanou featuring Do	
16 September	"The Logical Song"	Scooter	
23 September	"The Logical Song"	Scooter	
30 September	"The Logical Song"	Scooter	
7 October	"The Logical Song"	Scooter	
14 October	"The Ketchup Song (Aserejé)"	Las Ketchup	
21 October	"The Ketchup Song (Aserejé)"	Las Ketchup	
28 October	"The Ketchup Song (Aserejé)"	Las Ketchup	
4 November	"The Ketchup Song (Aserejé)"	Las Ketchup	
11 November	"The Ketchup Song (Aserejé)"	Las Ketchup	
18 November	"The Ketchup Song (Aserejé)"	Las Ketchup	
25 November	"The Ketchup Song (Aserejé)"	Las Ketchup	
2 December	"The Ketchup Song (Aserejé)"	Las Ketchup	
9 December	"The Ketchup Song (Aserejé)"	Las Ketchup	
16 December	"The Ketchup Song (Aserejé)"	Las Ketchup	
23 December	"The Ketchup Song (Aserejé)"	Las Ketchup	
30 December	"The Ketchup Song (Aserejé)"	Las Ketchup	

== See also ==
- 2002 in music
- List of number-one singles of 2002 (Australia)
- List of number-one club tracks of 2002 (Australia)
