= Blue's Country Magazine =

Australian magazine

- Type: Monthly magazine
- Format: 271 X 200 mm. 96 to 112 pages per issue
- Owner: Bauer Media Group
- Publisher: Bauer Media Australia
- Founded: 1986
- Headquarters: Brisbane, Queensland, Australia
- Circulation: 45,466
- ISSN: 2205-0493
- Website: www.bluescountry.com.au

Blue's Country Magazine is a rural affairs magazine owned by Bauer Media Group. It is distributed across the sub-tropical and tropical farming belt of Australia. As a free monthly publication the magazine fills a niche between weekly newspapers and subscription-based monthly magazines. The headquarters is in Brisbane.

While Blue’s (as it is commonly known) does cover news and current events the bulk of the magazine covers community interest pieces (including letters, humour and bush ‘yarns’), equipment and product information – it also has a stable of regular columnists. The magazine is unusual in that it prides itself as being specifically biased toward primary producers. The mascot of the publication, the eponymous 'Blue' who forms the apostrophe in the magazine's masthead, is a Blue Heeler.

== History ==
Blue's was initiated as four page 'Mail Bag' in September 1986, but was transformed to magazine format by the then publisher Paul Townsend in October 1987. The next publisher, MB Johnson Holdings Pty Ltd, purchased the magazine in June 1991. In this period the magazine expanded to its present position in the marketplace. Publishing Services Australia (later PSA Media) took over publishing in 2000 and expanded circulation into northern NSW while giving Blue’s a presence online. In 2007 the magazine became part of the Trader Business Media magazine stable in ACP's Trader International division. In 2013 Bauer Media Group acquired the title.

== Circulation ==
Blue’s is the largest circulating rural publication per issue in Queensland and the third largest in Australia. Initially circulation was 10,000 copies per issue and restricted to distribution in north Queensland. This was increased with the Aug/Sept 1993 issue to 19,000 copies per issue (CAB audit 18,438 copies per issue) and expanded to cover central Queensland and the Northern Territory. As of late 2008 Blue’s distributes 45,466 copies (CAB audit).
