= List of top 25 albums for 2002 in Australia =

Top 25 albums of 2002 < 2001 2003 >

Other Australian top charts for 2002
- top 25 singles
- Triple J Hottest 100

Australian number-one charts of 2002
- albums
- singles
- dance singles

The following lists the top 25 albums of 2002 in Australia from the Australian Recording Industry Association (ARIA) End of Year Albums Chart.

| # | Title | Artist | Highest pos. reached | Weeks at No. 1 |
|---|---|---|---|---|
| 1. | The Eminem Show | Eminem | 1 | 6 |
| 2. | Laundry Service | Shakira | 1 | 8 |
| 3. | Barricades & Brickwalls | Kasey Chambers | 1 | 2 (Note: Barricades & Brickwalls entered the ARIA Top 50 charts at #4 in September 2001 and left in November. It returned to the Top 50 briefly in December 2001, returned again for a longer run in February 2002 and peaked at #1 in March for two weeks. It has spent a total of 84 weeks in the charts, remaining until March 2003.) |
| 4. | Fever | Kylie Minogue | 1 | 5 (Note: Fever debuted at #1 in October 2001 and spent a total of 74 weeks in the charts, remaining until March 2003.) |
| 5. | Escape | Enrique Iglesias | 1 | 3 |
| 6. | A Funk Odyssey | Jamiroquai | 1 | 6 (Note: A Funk Odyssey debuted at #1 on the ARIA Top 50 in September 2001 for one week and left in November. It returned to the Top 50 in December 2001 and peaked at #1 in January / February 2002 for five more weeks. It has spent a total of 70 weeks in the charts, remaining until February 2003.) |
| 7. | By the Way | Red Hot Chili Peppers | 1 | 4 |
| 8. | Polyserena | george | 1 | 2 |
| 9. | 30 #1 Hits | Elvis Presley | 1 | 4 |
| 10. | Let Go | Avril Lavigne | 1 | 7 (Note: Let Go debuted at #3 on the ARIA Top 50 in September 2002 and peaked at #1 in mid-December for three weeks. It continued at #1 for four more weeks to late January 2003. It remained in the Top 50 until September 2003 and spent a total of 52 weeks in the charts.) |
| 11. | Nellyville | Nelly | 2 | |
| 12. | Swing When You're Winning | Robbie Williams | 3 | |
| 13. | Shrek | Soundtrack | 2 | |
| 14. | Songs in A Minor | Alicia Keys | 3 | |
| 15. | A New Day Has Come | Céline Dion | 1 | 5 |
| 16. | The Record (Greatest Hits) | Bee Gees | 2 | |
| 17. | Hybrid Theory | Linkin Park | 2 | |
| 18. | Diorama | Silverchair | 1 | 1 |
| 19. | The Final Dig? | The Twelfth Man | 1 | 5 (Note: The Final Dig? debuted at #1 on the ARIA Top 50 in mid-December 2001 for three weeks. It continued at #1 for two more weeks in January 2002. It remained in the Top 50 until late February 2002 and spent a total of 11 weeks in the charts.) |
| 20. | Missundaztood | Pink | 14 | |
| 21. | Destination | Ronan Keating | 3 | |
| 22. | Best of The Corrs | The Corrs | 2 | |
| 23. | Toxicity | System of a Down | 6 | |
| 24. | Weathered | Creed | 3 | |
| 25. | Sing When You're Winning | Robbie Williams | 7 | |

Peak chart positions from 2002 are from the ARIA Charts, overall position on the End of Year Chart is calculated by ARIA based on the number of weeks and position that the records reach within the Top 100 albums for each week during 2002.
