= List of number-one singles of 2002 (Australia) =

ARIA Charts number-one singles of 2002 < 2001 2003 >

Other Australian number-one charts of 2002
- albums
- dance singles

Top Australian singles and albums of 2002
- Triple J Hottest 100
- top 25 singles
- top 25 albums

The Australian Top 100 Singles Chart is a chart that ranks the best-performing singles of Australia. Published by the ARIA report, the data are compiled by the Australian Recording Industry Association (ARIA) based collectively on each single's weekly physical and digital sales and airplay. In 2002, there were 18 singles that topped the chart.

In 2002, 12 acts achieved their first number-one single in Australia, either as a lead artist or featured guest, including Shakira, Eminem, DJ Ötzi, Avril Lavigne, Nelly, Kelly Rowland, Las Ketchup and more have earned a number-one debut single this year. Rapper Eminem and Latino singer Shakira had two number-one singles that appeared in the 2002 issues. During the year, two collaboration singles reached the number-one position.

Shakira's "Whenever, Wherever" and Avril Lavigne's "Complicated" are the longest-running number-one singles of 2002, remaining in that position for six straight weeks. It is followed by Eminems' "Without Me", whose streak on the top spot reached five non-consecutive weeks. Another single with an extended chart run includes Nelly's and Rowland's "Dilemma", which topped the chart for four weeks.

Eminem is the most successful act in 2002 in terms of chart performance. He had two singles that topped the Australian Top 100 Singles Chart: "Without Me" and "Lose Yourself". The only other artist to have two number one singles in 2002 is Shakira.

== Chart history ==
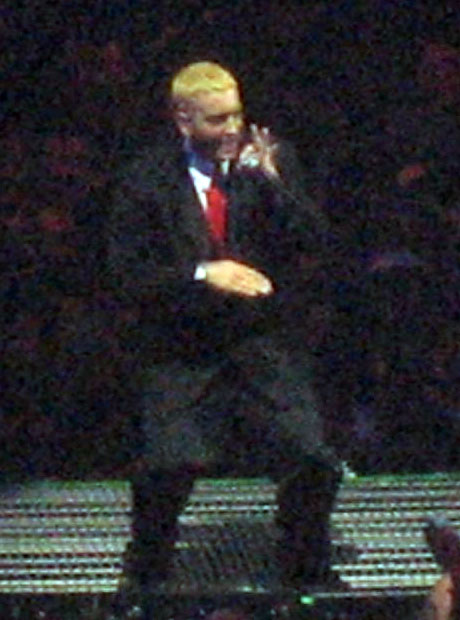
Rapper Eminem gained two Australian number one singles in 2002 and a total of nine non-consecutive weeks at number one with "Without Me" (five non-consecutive weeks at number one) and "Lose Yourself" (four consecutive weeks at number one. "Lose Yourself" also maintained its position for a further eight consecutive weeks in 2003.

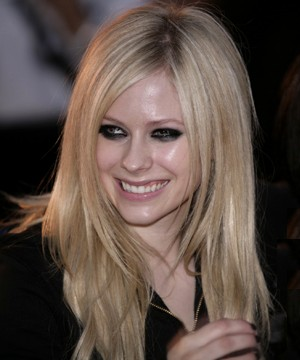
Singer Avril Lavigne gained her first Australian number one single with "Complicated" and topped the charts for six consecutive weeks, also it is the joint-longest run for a number one single in 2002.

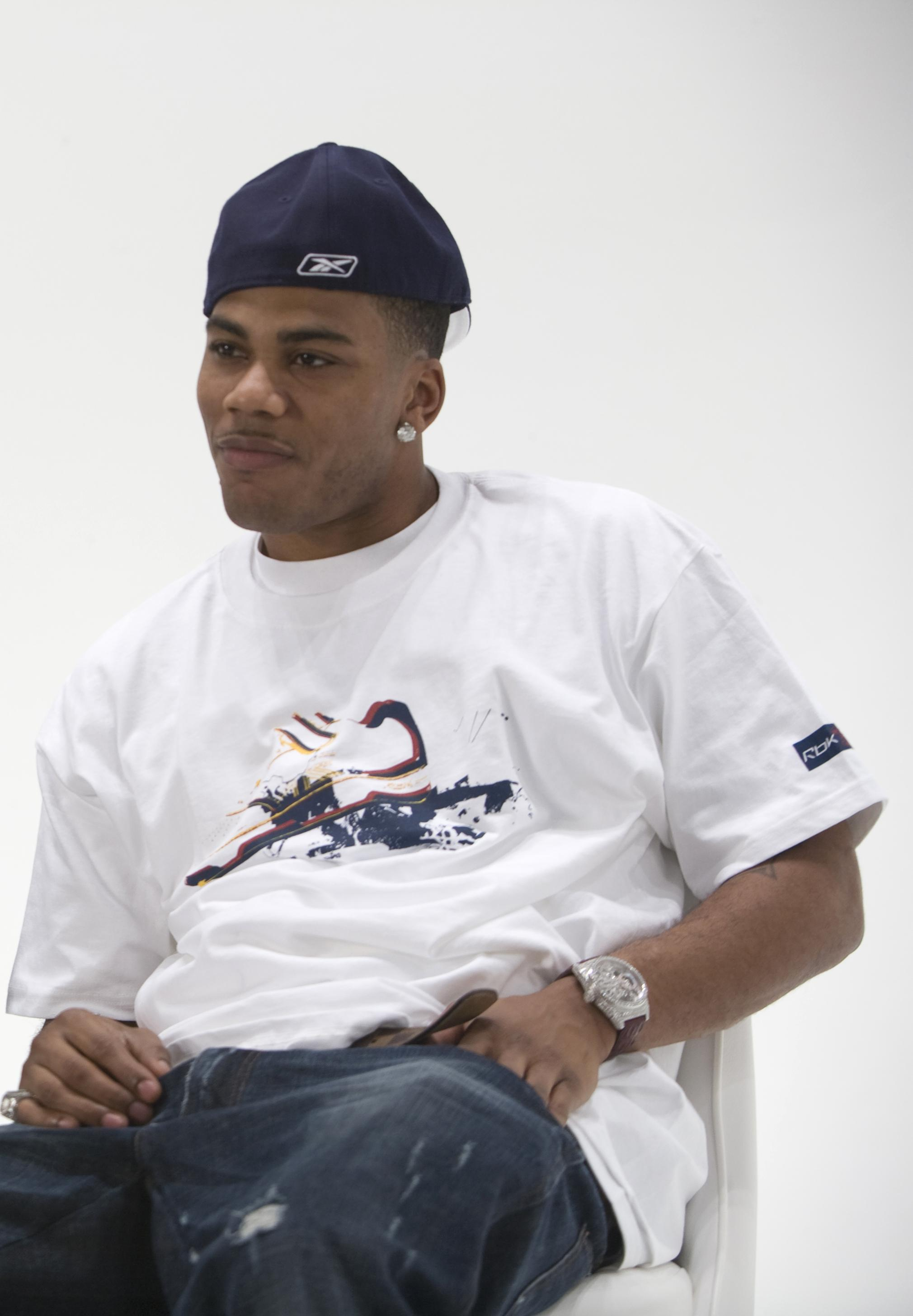
Rapper Nelly (with featured R&B singer Kelly Rowland) gained their first Australian number one single with "Dilemma", topping the charts for four consecutive weeks.

Key
The yellow background indicates the #1 song on ARIA's End of Year Singles Chart of 2002.

Date	Song	Artist(s)	References
6 January	"Get the Party Started"	P!nk	
13 January	"Get the Party Started"	P!nk	
20 January	"Hero"	Enrique Iglesias	
27 January	"Hero"	Enrique Iglesias	
3 February	"In Your Eyes"	Kylie Minogue	
10 February	"Whenever, Wherever"	Shakira	
17 February	"Whenever, Wherever"	Shakira	
24 February	"Whenever, Wherever"	Shakira	
3 March	"Whenever, Wherever"	Shakira	
10 March	"Whenever, Wherever"	Shakira	
17 March	"Whenever, Wherever"	Shakira	
24 March	"Not Pretty Enough"	Kasey Chambers	
31 March	"Not Pretty Enough"	Kasey Chambers	
7 April	"Not Pretty Enough"	Kasey Chambers	
14 April	"Not Pretty Enough"	Kasey Chambers	
21 April	"Hey Baby (Uhh, Ahh)"	DJ Ötzi	
28 April	"Hey Baby (Uhh, Ahh)"	DJ Ötzi	
5 May	"Hey Baby (Uhh, Ahh)"	DJ Ötzi	
12 May	"Hey Baby (Uhh, Ahh)"	DJ Ötzi	
19 May	"I'm Moving On"	Scott Cain	
26 May	"Underneath Your Clothes"	Shakira	
2 June	"Without Me"	Eminem	
9 June	"Without Me"	Eminem	
16 June	"Kiss Kiss"	Holly Valance	
23 June	"Without Me"	Eminem	
30 June	"A Little Less Conversation"	Elvis vs. JXL	
7 July	"A Little Less Conversation"	Elvis vs. JXL	
14 July	"A Little Less Conversation"	Elvis vs. JXL	
21 July	"Without Me"	Eminem	
28 July	"Without Me"	Eminem	
4 August	"A Little Less Conversation"	Elvis vs. JXL	
11 August	"A Thousand Miles"	Vanessa Carlton	
18 August	"A Thousand Miles"	Vanessa Carlton	
25 August	"Complicated"	Avril Lavigne	
1 September	"Complicated"	Avril Lavigne	
8 September	"Complicated"	Avril Lavigne	
15 September	"Complicated"	Avril Lavigne	
22 September	"Complicated"	Avril Lavigne	
29 September	"Complicated"	Avril Lavigne	
6 October	"The Logical Song"	Scooter	
13 October	"The Logical Song"	Scooter	
20 October	"Aserejé (The Ketchup Song)"	Las Ketchup	
27 October	"Dilemma"	Nelly featuring Kelly Rowland	
3 November	"Dilemma"	Nelly featuring Kelly Rowland	
10 November	"Dilemma"	Nelly featuring Kelly Rowland	
17 November	"Dilemma"	Nelly featuring Kelly Rowland	
24 November	"Aserejé (The Ketchup Song)"	Las Ketchup	
1 December	"Aserejé (The Ketchup Song)"	Las Ketchup	
8 December	"Born to Try"	Delta Goodrem	
15 December	"Lose Yourself"	Eminem	
22 December	"Lose Yourself"	Eminem	
29 December	"Lose Yourself"	Eminem	

Songs that peaked at number 2 include "Superman (It's Not Easy)" by Five for Fighting, "Girlfriend" by *NSYNC feat. Nelly, "Dance with Me" by 112 and "Objection (Tango)" by Shakira.

Songs that peaked at number 3 include "Murder on the Dancefloor" by Sophie Ellis-Bextor, "Hot in Herre" by Nelly, "If Tomorrow Never Comes" by Ronan Keating, "U Got It Bad" by Usher and "Down Boy" by Holly Vallance.

Other hit songs included "Tribute" by Tenacious D (4), "Get Over You" by Sophie Ellis-Bextor (4), "Heaven" by DJ Sammy, "Better Man" by Robbie Williams (6), and "Livin' It Up" by Ja Rule (6).

== See also ==
- List of number-one dance singles of 2002 (Australia)
- List of number-one albums of 2002 (Australia)

== Notes ==
- Number of number-one singles: 18
- Longest run at number one: "Whenever, Wherever" by Shakira and "Complicated" by Avril Lavigne (6 weeks).
