= Nash Chambers =

Australian musician (born 1974)

- Born: 8 May 1974 (age 52); Mount Gambier, South Australia
- Genre: Country
- Occupations: Musician; record producer; talent manager; label owner
- Instruments: Vocals; drums, acoustic guitar; harmonica, didgeridoo
- Years active: 1986–present
- Label: Essence
- Formerly of: Dead Ringer Band
- Website: essencegroup.net.au

Nash Chambers (born 8 May 1974, Mount Gambier) is an Australian record producer, talent manager, audio engineer and multi-instrumentalist. He is a former member of the family country music group, Dead Ringer Band (1986–98), with his father Bill, mother Diane, and younger sister Kasey Chambers.

Chambers works from his own Foggy Mountain Studios in the Hunter Valley. At the ARIA Music Awards of 2007 he was nominated for Producer of the Year for Kasey's album Carnival (August 2006). He has won Golden Guitars for Producer of the Year and for Engineer of the Year.

== Biography ==
Nash Chambers is the first child of country musicians, Bill and Diane Chambers. Soon after his younger sister, Kasey, was born in 1976 the family travelled around the Nullarbor Plain, where their parents hunted foxes and rabbits for pelts during seven or eight months a year, spanning nine years. For summer holidays they returned to Southend, South Australia. Chambers had been raised in the Seventh-day Adventist Church by his parents. From 1986 Bill and Diane began performing as a country music duo and added first Kasey and then Chambers to their act, which became the Dead Ringer Band.

Chambers was recorded on two albums released by his father, Sea Eagle (1987) and Kindred Spirit (1991). In 1992 the family's group, Dead Ringer Band, became a full-time concern and they toured both rural and city venues. Chambers provided vocals, drums, acoustic guitar, harmonica and didgeridoo for the band. They released four albums, Red Desert Sky (1993), Home Fires (1995), Living in the Circle (1997) and Hopeville (1998), before disbanding. By that time his parents had separated. Chambers assisted Kasey's solo work starting with her first album, The Captain (May 1999), recorded late in 1998. He provided backing vocals, bass guitar and acoustic guitar as well as being her talent manager, record producer and audio engineer.

At the ARIA Music Awards of 2007 he was nominated for Producer of the Year for Kasey's album, Carnival (August 2006). He has won Golden Guitars for Producer of the Year and for Engineer of the Year at the Country Music Awards of Australia ceremonies. As from April 2018, Chambers has continued to work with Kasey – except on her tenth album, Bittersweet (August 2014) – up to, Campfire (April 2018). During 2002 Chambers produced the debut solo album for Shane Nicholson (ex-Pretty Violet Stain), It's a Movie, including the track, "Designed to Fade", which is a duet with Kasey. Kasey and Nicholson were married in late 2005. Chambers produced albums by both artists as individuals and as a duo.

Since November 2008 Chambers has worked at his own Foggy Mountain Studios, Laguna, in the Hunter Valley. He also runs a recording label and talent management company, Essence Music Group, with his wife Veronica.

== Discography ==
Nash Chambers is credited with: vocals, guitars (acoustic, electric, bass), harmonica, didgeridoo, drums, wah-wah pedal, producer, engineer, mixing

- Dead Ringer Band – Red Desert Sky (1993), Home Fires (1995), Living in the Circle (1997), Hopeville (1998)
- Bill & Audrey – Looking Back to See (1999)
- Kasey Chambers – The Captain (1999), Barricades & Brickwalls (2001), Wayward Angel (2004), Carnival (2006), Little Bird (2010), Storybook (2011)
- Bill Chambers – Sleeping with the Blues (2002)
- Troy Cassar-Daley – Long Way Home (2002), Borrowed & Blue (2004)
- Shane Nicholson – It's a Movie (2003), Faith & Science (2006)
- Jimmy Barnes – Out in the Blue (2007)
- Archie Roach – Journey (2007)
- Kasey Chambers & Shane Nicholson – Rattlin' Bones (2008), Wreck & Ruin (2012)
- Matt Joe Gow and the Dead Leaves – The Messenger (2009)
- Grizzlee Train - Burned Him Again EP (2016)
