= List of number-one albums of 2002 (Australia) =

ARIA Charts number-one albums of 2002 < 2001 2003 >

Other Australian number-one charts of 2002
- singles
- dance singles

Top Australian singles and albums of 2002
- Triple J Hottest 100
- top 25 singles
- top 25 albums

These are the Australian number-one albums of 2002, per the ARIA Charts.

Key
The yellow background indicates the #1 album on ARIA's End of Year Albums Chart of 2002.

| Issue date | Album | Artist | Weeks at number one (total) |
|---|---|---|---|
| 7 January | The Final Dig? | The Twelfth Man | 5 weeks |
| 14 January | A Funk Odyssey | Jamiroquai | 6 weeks |
| 21 January | A Funk Odyssey | Jamiroquai | 6 weeks |
| 28 January | A Funk Odyssey | Jamiroquai | 6 weeks |
| 4 February | Come with Us | The Chemical Brothers | 1 week |
| 11 February | A Funk Odyssey | Jamiroquai | 6 weeks |
| 18 February | A Funk Odyssey | Jamiroquai | 6 weeks |
| 25 February | Barricades & Brickwalls | Kasey Chambers | 2 weeks |
| 4 March | Under Rug Swept | Alanis Morissette | 1 week |
| 11 March | Polyserena | George | 2 weeks |
| 18 March | Polyserena | George | 2 weeks |
| 25 March | Barricades & Brickwalls | Kasey Chambers | 2 weeks |
| 1 April | A New Day Has Come | Celine Dion | 5 weeks |
| 8 April | Diorama | Silverchair | 1 week |
| 15 April | A New Day Has Come | Celine Dion | 5 weeks |
| 22 April | A New Day Has Come | Celine Dion | 5 weeks |
| 29 April | A New Day Has Come | Celine Dion | 5 weeks |
| 6 May | Laundry Service | Shakira | 2 weeks |
| 13 May | A New Day Has Come | Celine Dion | 5 weeks |
| 20 May | 18 | Moby | 1 week |
| 27 May | Laundry Service | Shakira | 2 weeks |
| 3 June | The Eminem Show | Eminem | 7 weeks |
| 10 June | The Eminem Show | Eminem | 7 weeks |
| 17 June | The Eminem Show | Eminem | 7 weeks |
| 24 June | The Eminem Show | Eminem | 7 weeks |
| 1 July | The Eminem Show | Eminem | 7 weeks |
| 8 July | The Eminem Show | Eminem | 7 weeks |
| 15 July | By the Way | Red Hot Chili Peppers | 4 weeks |
| 22 July | By the Way | Red Hot Chili Peppers | 4 weeks |
| 29 July | Torch the Moon | The Whitlams | 1 week |
| 5 August | By the Way | Red Hot Chili Peppers | 4 weeks |
| 12 August | By the Way | Red Hot Chili Peppers | 4 weeks |
| 19 August | Shoot This | Motor Ace | 1 week |
| 26 August | Escape | Enrique Iglesias | 3 weeks |
| 2 September | A Rush of Blood to the Head | Coldplay | 1 week |
| 9 September | Escape | Enrique Iglesias | 3 weeks |
| 16 September | Escape | Enrique Iglesias | 3 weeks |
| 23 September | The Eminem Show | Eminem | 7 weeks |
| 30 September | ELV1S: 30 #1 Hits | Elvis Presley | 4 weeks |
| 7 October | ELV1S: 30 #1 Hits | Elvis Presley | 4 weeks |
| 14 October | ELV1S: 30 #1 Hits | Elvis Presley | 4 weeks |
| 21 October | ELV1S: 30 #1 Hits | Elvis Presley | 4 weeks |
| 28 October | One by One | Foo Fighters | 1 week |
| 4 November | Nirvana | Nirvana | 1 week |
| 11 November | The Best of 1990–2000 | U2 | 1 week |
| 18 November | Riot Act | Pearl Jam | 1 week |
| 25 November | Up! | Shania Twain | 1 week |
| 2 December | The Last Time | John Farnham | 1 week |
| 9 December | Let Go | Avril Lavigne | 7 weeks |
| 16 December | Let Go | Avril Lavigne | 7 weeks |
| 23 December | Let Go | Avril Lavigne | 7 weeks |
| 30 December | Let Go | Avril Lavigne | 7 weeks |

== See also ==
- 2002 in music
- List of number-one singles in Australia in 2002

== Notes ==
- Number of number one albums: 24
- Longest run at number one (during 2002): The Eminem Show by Eminem (7 weeks)
