= Bill Chambers (musician) =

Australian country musician

- Born: Southend, South Australia, Australia
- Genre: Country
- Occupations: Singer, musician

Bill Chambers is an Australian country musician and former member of the Dead Ringer Band. Chambers's albums Sleeping with the Blues and Cold Trail were nominated for the ARIA Award for Best Country Album. He is best known as being the father of Nash Chambers and Kasey Chambers.

== Career ==
Bill Chambers was born in Southend, South Australia and married his wife Diane at age 20. Together they had two children, Nash in 1974 and Kasey in 1976. Shortly after the birth of Kasey in 1976, Chambers moved his family to central Australia's Nullarbor Plain and earned a living by hunting and trapping rabbits and foxes that raided Nullarbor poultry farms, then selling the pelts. Bill home schooled Nash and Kasey, and taught them American folk and country music by the Carter Family, Jimmie Rogers, Hank Williams, Townes Van Zandt and Gram Parsons, as well as Australian country artists Slim Dusty, Buddy Williams and Tex Morton. In 1986, Bill moved the family to Southend, located on the southern coast of Australia, and began playing as a band at local public houses.

As a family quartet, billed under Bill's name, they released Sea Eagle in 1987 and Kindred Spirit in 1991, before changing their name to Dead Ringer Band.

In 1998, Bill and Diane separated, then divorced, and ended Dead Ringer Band after four studio albums. Bill moved to Sydney, started producing records, founding a record label, Reckless Records. Late in 1998, the label's first album Looking Back to See with Audrey Auld (as Bill & Audrey) was released. By 1999, Chambers began focussing on supporting Kasey's fledgling solo career.

In 2002 Chambers released a solo album called Sleeping with the Blues, which was nominated for Best Country Album at the ARIA Music Awards of 2003. He contributed to the various artists album Reckless Records Garage Sale 1997-2003.

In 2006, Chambers released Frozen Ground; in 2009, he released Drifting South.

In July 2013, Chambers released Live at the Pub Tamworth, which featured special guests Kasey Chambers, Shane Nicholson and Kevin Bennett.

In January 2016, Chambers released Cold Trail. The album was nominated for Best Country Album at the ARIA Music Awards of 2016.

In January 2019, Chambers released 1952, an album inspired by Hank Williams.

== Discography ==
=== Albums ===
List of album, with selected details
Title	Album details
Sea Eagle	Released: 1987; Label: Dead Ringer Band; Formats: CD
Kindred Spirit	Released: 1991; Label: Dead Ringer Band; Formats: CD
Looking Back to See (with Audrey Auld) as Bill & Audrey	Released: 1998; Label: Reckless Records (RECK001); Formats: CD
Sleeping with the Blues	Released: 2002; Label: Reckless Records (RECK003); Formats: CD
Frozen Ground	Released: February 2006; Label: Whitewater / Essence (3496882); Formats: CD
Drifting South	Released: September 2009; Label: Whitewater (001); Formats: CD
Live at the Pub Tamworth	Released: July 2013; Note: Live album; Label: Whitewater (004); Formats: CD, digital download
Cold Trail	Released: 22 January 2016; Label: Whitewater ( 004); Formats: CD, digital download
1952	Released: 18 January 2019; Label: Bill Chambers; Formats: digital download

== Awards and nominations ==
=== AIR Awards ===
The Australian Independent Record Awards (commonly known informally as AIR Awards) is an annual awards night to recognise, promote and celebrate the success of Australia's Independent Music sector.

Year	Nominee / work	Award	Result
2017	Cold Trail	Best Independent Country Album	Nominated

=== ARIA Music Awards ===
The ARIA Music Awards is an annual awards ceremony that recognises excellence, innovation, and achievement across all genres of Australian music. Bill Chambers has been nominated twice.

Year	Nominee / work	Award	Result
2003	Sleeping with the Blues	Best Country Album	Nominated
2016	Cold Trail	Best Country Album	Nominated

=== Country Music Awards of Australia ===
The Country Music Awards of Australia (CMAA) (also known as the Golden Guitar Awards) is an annual awards night held in January during the Tamworth Country Music Festival, celebrating recording excellence in the Australian country music industry. They have been held annually since 1973.

Year	Nominee / work	Award	Result (wins only)
1992	"Things Are Not The Same on the Land" (written by Bill Chambers and recorded by Slim Dusty)	Smoky Dawson Award	Won

=== Tamworth Songwriters Awards ===
The Tamworth Songwriters Association (TSA) is an annual songwriting contest for original country songs, awarded in January at the Tamworth Country Music Festival. They commenced in 1986. Bill Chambers won one award in that time.

Year	Nominee / work	Award	Result (wins only)
1992	"Things Are Not The Same on the Land" by Bill Chambers	Traditional Bush Ballad of the Year	Won
