= Barricades & Brickwalls =

Studio album by Kasey Chambers
- Released: 3 September 2001
- Studio: Australia; Beach House, Music Cellar, Sing Sing, Nashville, Tennessee; True Tone
- Genre: Country
- Length: 54:16
- Label: Essence; Warner Bros.
- Producer: Nash Chambers

Kasey Chambers chronology
The Captain (1999)	Barricades & Brickwalls (2001)	Wayward Angel (2004)

Alternative cover
- International cover

Singles from Barricades & Brickwalls
- 1. "Runaway Train" Released: August 2001; 2. "On a Bad Day" Released: October 2001; 3. "Not Pretty Enough" Released: January 2002; 4. "Million Tears" Released: 3 June 2002; 5. "If I Were You" Released: 14 October 2002

Professional ratings
Review scores
Source	Rating
AllMusic	link
Encyclopedia of Popular Music	4/5 stars
Robert Christgau	A−
Rolling Stone	link

Barricades & Brickwalls is the second studio album by Australian country music singer Kasey Chambers released in Australia on 3 September 2001 by Essence Records and on 12 February 2002 on Warner Bros. Records in the US. The album was mainly written by Chambers with help from Worm Werchon and her father Bill Chambers. Barricades & Brickwalls debuted in the top ten on the Australian ARIA Albums Chart, and sales were considerably higher than those of Chambers’ first album, The Captain (1999). Its singles were successful in most music markets, "Not Pretty Enough", the most successful song from the album gave Chambers her first number-one single in Australia and reached number 4 in New Zealand. Other singles includes "Runaway Train", "On a Bad Day", "Million Tears" and "If I Were You". The commercial success of the album led the album to eight nominations at the ARIA Awards.

The song "Not Pretty Enough" reached number-one on the Australian ARIA Singles Chart, going double platinum, and Chambers became the first musical act in Australian history to have an album and single sit at the top of the charts at the same time. The singles "Million Tears" and "If I Were You" would later reach the top forty in Australia. The album did not reach quite the same audience in the United States, peaking just outside the top 100 of the Billboard 200. It did, however, reach the top of the Heatseekers chart as well as hitting the top 20 of the Top Country Albums. The track "Crossfire" features the Living End.

The album would end up going platinum in 2002, becoming the highest selling album by an Australian artist in that year, along with the highest selling single. Chambers, because of the success of this album, won Best Country Album, Best Female Artist, and Album of the Year at the 2002 ARIA Awards. In October 2010, the album was listed in the top 40 in the book, 100 Best Australian Albums.

== Track listing ==
All tracks are written by Kasey Chambers, except where noted.

Barricades & Brickwalls track listing
No.	Title	Length
1.	"Barricades & Brickwalls" (Kasey Chambers, Worm Werchon, Bill Chambers)	3:13
2.	"Not Pretty Enough"	3:20
3.	"On a Bad Day" (with Lucinda Williams)	2:51
4.	"Runaway Train" (K. Chambers, Werchon)	3:25
5.	"A Little Bit Lonesome"	2:59
6.	"Nullarbor Song"	4:27
7.	"Million Tears"	5:02
8.	"Still Feeling Blue" (Gram Parsons)	2:44
9.	"This Mountain"	4:54
10.	"Crossfire"	2:16
11.	"Falling into You"	3:45
12.	"If I Were You"	4:10
13.	"I Still Pray (featuring Paul Kelly and Uncle Bill)" (hidden song "Ignorance" at end)	11:10
Total length:		54:16

== Charts ==
=== Weekly charts ===
Weekly chart performance for Barricades & Brickwalls
Chart (2001–2004)	Peak position
Australian Albums (ARIA)	1
UK Country Albums (OCC)	3
US Billboard 200	104
US Top Country Albums (Billboard)	12

=== Year-end charts ===
Year-end chart performance for Barricades & Brickwalls
Chart (2001)	Position
Australian Albums (ARIA)	52
Australian Country Albums (ARIA)	3
Chart (2002)	Position
Australian Albums (ARIA)	3
Australian Country Albums (ARIA)	1
Chart (2003)	Position
Australian Albums (ARIA)	39
Australian Country Albums (ARIA)	3
Chart (2004)	Position
Australian Country Albums (ARIA)	14
Chart (2005)	Position
Australian Country Albums (ARIA)	17

=== Decade-end chart ===
Decade-end chart performance for Barricades & Brickwalls
Chart (2000–2009)	Position
Australian Albums (ARIA)	26

== Certifications ==
Certifications for Barricades & Brickwalls
Region	Certification	Certified units/sales
Australia (ARIA)	7× Platinum	490,000^{^}
^{^} Shipments figures based on certification alone.
