= Beccy Cole discography =

- Studio albums: 12
- Live albums: 1
- Compilation albums: 1

Australian country music singer Beccy Cole has released twelve studio albums, one live album and one compilation.

== Albums ==
=== Studio albums ===
| Year | Album details | Peak chart positions | | Certifications (sales thresholds) |
| Year | Album details | AUS | AUS Country | Certifications (sales thresholds) |
|---|---|---|---|---|
| 1997 | Beccy Cole: Released: 11 July 1997; Label: Harvestmen Records / Sony Records | 122 | 12 | |
| 2001 | Wild at Heart: Released: 15 January 2001; Label: ABC Country / Universal Music Australia | 82 | 2 | AUS: Gold |
| 2003 | Little Victories: Released: 20 January 2003; Label: ABC Music / Universal Music Australia | 29 | 4 | AUS: Gold |
| 2005 | Feel This Free: Released: 11 April 2005; Label: ABC Music / Universal Music Australia (1777806) | 66 | 3 | |
| 2010 | Preloved: Released: 3 September 2010; Label: Sony BMG Australia; Covers album | 32 | 3 | |
| 2011 | Songs & Pictures: Released: 30 September 2011; Label: Beccy Cole Music / ABC Music | 24 | 4 | |
| 2014 | Great Women of Country (with Melinda Schneider): Released: 7 November 2014; Label: Beccy Cole Music / ABC Music (4701407); Covers album | 9 | 1 | |
| 2015 | Sweet Rebecca: Released: 10 April 2015; Label: Beccy Cole Music / ABC Music (4722645) | 19 | 2 | |
| 2017 | The Great Country Songbook Volume 2 (with Adam Harvey): Released: 28 April 2017; Label: Sony Music Australia (88985410882) | 6 | 1 | |
| 2018 | Lioness: Released: 24 August 2018; Label: Beccy Cole Music / ABC Music (6787299) | 31 | 5 | |
| 2022 | The Great Country Songbook Volume III (with Adam Harvey): Released: 9 September 2022; Label: Sony Music Australia (19658756162) | 36 | 1 | |
| 2026 | Through the Haze: Released: 13 March 2026; Label: Sony Music Australia (19658756162) | 26 | 2 | |
"—" denotes the album failed to chart or was not released.

=== Live albums ===
| Year | Album details | Peak chart positions | |
| Year | Album details | AUS | AUS Country |
|---|---|---|---|
| 2007 | Live @ Lizotte's: Released: 12 October 2007; Label: Beccy Cole Music / ABC Music | 63 | 9 |

=== Compilation albums ===
| Year | Album details | Peak chart positions |
| Year | Album details | AUS Country |
|---|---|---|
| 2013 | Beccy's Big Hits: Released: 17 May 2013; Label: Ambition Entertainment / EMI | 25 |

== Video albums ==
- Just a Girl Singer (2 August 2004) ABC Country / Universal Music Australia No. 6 AUS DVD
