= Angus Gill =

Australian singer-songwriter (born 1998)

- Gill performing in 2019

Background information
- Born: Angus Christopher Gill; 5 February 1998 (age 28); Port Macquarie, New South Wales
- Origin: Wauchope, New South Wales
- Genres: Country, Americana, Bluegrass
- Occupations: Singer/songwriter, record producer, comedian, author
- Instruments: Vocals, guitar, mandolin, banjo, piano, hammond organ, dobro
- Years active: 2008—
- Website: www.angusgill.com.au

Angus Christopher Gill (born 5 February 1998) is an Australian singer-songwriter, record producer, comedian and author from Wauchope in New South Wales. Gill is a Golden Guitar winner and an Australian Independent Country Music Award winner. He has had twenty-one number-one songs on the Australian country music radio charts. In November 2019, Gill became one of the youngest Australian artists to perform on the Grand Ole Opry in Nashville, Tennessee.

== Biography ==
=== Early years ===
Angus grew up in Wauchope on the Mid North Coast of New South Wales. He first picked up the guitar at age 6 and played his first gig at his local country music club, the Hastings Country Music Association, at age 7. Gill attended Wauchope Public School, where he formed his own band, Angus Gill and the Wild Turkeys, later attending St Columba Anglican School in Port Macquarie. Whilst in school, Gill honed his craft by playing regular gigs at the Wauchope's heritage theme park Timbertown and hosting his own radio show on Wauchope based community radio station 2WAY FM. Gill received a scholarship to attend the CMAA Academy of Country Music in Tamworth in 2012 and released his debut EP Livewire in 2014.

=== 2017–2024 ===
Gill released his self-produced debut album Nomad on 15 September 2017 via Checked Label Services. The album features collaborations with Adam Harvey, Gina Jeffreys, Kevin Bennett, Luke O'Shea, Bill Chambers, Drew McAlister, Troy Kemp, Mike Carr, Amos Morris and others.

In 2019, Gill signed a global publishing deal with Origin Music Publishing. He released his second studio album Welcome to My Heart in September 2019, which debuted at number 2 on the ARIA Country Albums Chart. The album was nominated for 'Traditional Country Album of the Year' at the 48th Country Music Awards of Australia.

In 2020, Gill was nominated for an ARIA Award for his work with Bev Killick for Best Comedy Release. He collaborated with the members of the Paul Kelly band for his third studio album 3 Minute Movies, released as Angus Gill & Seasons of Change, in September 2020 on Rivershack Records/MGM. The album features a duet with US singer-songwriter Steve Earle and a guest appearance from Mark Lizotte. 3 Minute Movies reached number 1 on the AIR Albums Chart, number 2 on the ARIA Australian Country Albums Chart and number 28 on the ARIA Top 50 Albums Chart. Gill and Seasons of Change were nominated for two Golden Guitar awards at the 49th Country Music Awards of Australia.

In October 2021, Gill released The Scrapbook which became his highest ARIA chart peak, debuting at number 1 on the ARIA Australian Country Albums Chart and number 19 on the ARIA Top 50 Albums Chart. He was nominated for four Golden Guitar awards at the 50th Country Music Awards of Australia, winning one for Bush Ballad of the Year for The Easy Way. In 2022, Gill had three number 1 hits on the Country Songs Top 40 Australian Airplay Chart in the span of six weeks.

Gill produced TC Cassidy's 2022 comeback album Travelling Heart, which reached number 2 on the ARIA Australian Country Albums Chart and earned a Golden Guitar nomination for Traditional Country Album of the Year. Two singles from the album subsequently reached number 1 on Australian country radio.

Gill was nominated for three awards at the 2024 CMAA. In February 2024, he relocated to Nashville, Tennessee and released his first compilation album, titled The Songwriter... So Far.

=== 2025 ===
In October 2025, Gill released Postcards a bluegrass album covering classic Australian songs. He also published his debut novella Departure & Arrival, a work of fiction inspired by his grandmother's journey with Alzheimer's disease.

== Discography ==
=== Albums ===
List of studio albums, with release date, label, and selected chart positions shown
Title	Details	Peak chart positions	
Title	Details	AUS	AUS Country
Nomad	Released: 15 September 2017; Label: Checked Label Services; Formats: CD, LP, digital download, streaming	—	13
Welcome to My Heart	Released: 20 September 2019; Label: ABC/Universal; Formats: CD, digital download, streaming	47	2
3 Minute Movies (as Angus Gill & Seasons of Change)	Released: 25 September 2020; Label: Rivershack/MGM; Formats: CD, digital download, streaming	28	2
The Scrapbook	Released: 24 September 2021; Label: Rivershack/MGM; Formats: CD, LP, digital download, streaming	19	1
Departure & Arrival (as Angus Gill & Seasons of Change)	Released: 18 August 2023; Label: Rivershack/MGM; Formats: CD, digital download, streaming		1
Postcards	Released: 24 October 2025; Label: ORiGin Music / Warner; Formats: CD, digital download, streaming		

=== Compilation albums ===
Title	Details
The Songwriter... So Far	Released: 23 February 2024; Label: Rivershack; Formats: digital download, streaming

=== Extended plays ===
Title	Details
Livewire	Released: 2014; Label: Angus Gill; Formats: CD
The Gilly Season	Released: 2022; Label: Rivershack Records/MGM; Formats: Digital download
McCusker Gill (with Eric McCusker)	Released: 21 March 2025; Label: Rivershack Records; Formats: Digital download

== Awards ==
=== CMA Awards ===
The Country Music Awards of Australia is an annual awards night held in January during the Tamworth Country Music Festival, celebrating recording excellence in the Australian country music industry.

Year	Nominee / work	Award	Result (wins only)
2022	"The Easy Way" (with Manfred Vijars)	Bush Ballad of the Year	Won

=== Australian Independent Country Music Awards ===
The Australian Independent Country Music Awards recognises the achievements of independent recording artists. The prestigious awards commenced in 1996.

Year	Nominee / work	Award	Result (wins only)
2018	"Hands Are Clean"	Male Rising Star	Won

=== Tamworth Songwriters Awards ===
The Tamworth Songwriters Association (TSA) is an annual songwriting awards night for original country songs, awarded in January at the Tamworth Country Music Festival. They commenced in 1986.

Year	Nominee / work	Award	Result (wins only)
2013	"Names Upon the Wall"	Junior Songwriter	Won
