= Mildura Country Music Festival =

- Genre: Country music
- Dates: Late September to early October
- Locations: Mildura, Victoria
- Website: milduracountrymusic.com.au

The Mildura Country Music Festival was an annual Australian country music festival based in Mildura, Victoria. The 1994 event was held in October, which the Australian Country Music Ambassador, Kelly Tassone felt was "fast becoming a favourite festival with performers." In 2005 it was sponsored by Telstra Countrywide. It focused on independent country music artists (about 95 percent of performers in the Australian country music industry).

This festival has been virtual since 2020.

== Winners ==
Much of the Festival is free and a live concert and radio presentation of the Australian Independent Country Music Awards, recognising the achievements of independent recording artists. Previous Independent Country Music Awards finalists and winners include:

- Kate Ballantyne
- Vanya
- Darren Coggan
- Michael O'Rourke
- Dianna Corcoran
- Carter & Carter
- Brendon Walmsley (1999)
- Allan Caswell
- Angus Gill
- Aleyce Simmonds
- Luke O'Shea

Performers have included:

- Felicity Urquhart
- Craig Giles
- Peter Horan
- Tracy Coster
- Reg Poole
- Glenn Jones
- Fisk & Cristian
- Pater Pratt
- Owen Blundell
- Terry Gordon
- Sweeney Killeen
- Michael King
- Carter & Carter
- Kiara Rodrigues

== See also ==
- List of country music festivals
- List of folk festivals
- Country music
