= The Flood (band) =

Australian roots music band

- Origin: Sydney, New South Wales, Australia
- Genres: Roots, country rock
- Years active: 1995–present
- Label: One Stop
- Members: Kevin Bennett; Glen Hannah; Wayne 'Killer' Kellett; Mik McCartin; Gary Carruthers
- Past members: Mark Collins; Doug Bligh; Steve Fearnley; James Gillard; Tim Wedde; Scott Hills; Shane Flew; Chris Haigh

The Flood are an Australian roots music band formed by Kevin Bennett and James Gillard, with Mark Collins and Doug Bligh. The group won the Tamworth 2006 Golden Guitar Award for Vocal Group or Duo of the Year with their track, "Hello Blue Sky". In 2008 the line-up was Bennett and Gillard with Tim Wedde on keyboards, accordion, vibraphone and talent manager; and Scott Hills on drums (replaced Steve Fearnley).

== History ==
=== 1995-1998: Founding years ===
The Flood's founders Kevin Bennett and James Gillard had performed as an acoustic duo and issued two albums on ABC Records, Two of Everything in the Carpark and Two. Soon after they formed the Flood in Sydney with Bennett on lead vocals and electric guitar; Gillard on bass guitar and vocals, Mark Collins on guitar, banjo and vocals with Doug Bligh on drums and percussion. This line-up recorded The Ballad Of KB in 1998, which was included in Iain Sheddon's Top Twenty Australian Country/Roots Albums. The subsequent line-up included Steve Fearnley on drums and percussion; Gillard on guitar and vocals, Wayne 'Killer' Kellett on bass and vocals and Tim Wedde on keyboards, accordion vocals, and vibraphone (later he was also their manager).

=== 1999-present: Recording years ===
The Flood's debut album, The Ballad of K.B. appeared in 1999. Tim Badrick of Lost Treasures felt that it was "jammed packed full of The Flood's unique amalgam of country, rock, blues and even a dash of boogie piano, be that unintentional or not." The tracks were mostly written by Bennett with some co-written by Bennett, Gillard, Bligh and Collins. The lead track was released as the title track on an extended play, Don't Look Back at Me (1999).

During 2002 the Flood had also supported a tour by United States alternative country music artist, Kevin Welch, with a performance at Sydney's Basement recorded for a joint-release live album, Live Down Here on Earth (22 September 2003), and a DVD, Plenty of Time (2004). According to Amazon.com's editor the CD is an "Aussie exclusive album from one of Nashville's most acclaimed songwriter's & Australia's greatest country/roots outfit." Dave Dawson of Nu Country caught a gig by Welch and the Flood on a subsequent tour at the Corner Hotel in Richmond, in November 2003, "The Flood proved a perfect pairing with Welch on an energetic show that belied the late nights and gruelling road miles of their east coast foray. It was a credit that both acts remained energised... The Welch-Flood double bill was good in theory but an imbalance in practice with Welch having less stage time than The Flood."

In 2003 the Flood issued their self-titled second album, which includes the track, "Paul Kelly's Blues" – written by Bennett. The track was nominated for APRA Song of the Year at the Country Music Awards of Australia in 2004. During that year they issued another EP, Australian for Broken Heart, and promoted it with an east coast tour from October to December. According to Christie Eliezer of In Music & Media they provide "strong narratives, backwater blues and meandering ballads." The EP's title track was nominated for APRA-AMCOS Independent Country Music Single of the Year.

The group's next album, The Late Late Show (16 January 2006), was nominated for the Best Blues and Roots Album category at the ARIA Music Awards of 2006. Later albums included Everybody's Favourite (2008) and Skin (by Kevin Bennett and the Flood, 2015).

Bennett teamed with fellow country musicians, Lyn Bowtell and Felicity Urquhart and formed Bennett Bowtell Urquhart. They released Bennett Bowtell Urquhart on 16 January 2016.

== Discography ==
=== Albums ===
Title	Details
Two of Everything in the Carpark (by Kevin Bennett and James Gillard)	Released: 1995; Label:
The Ballad of K.B.	Released: 1999; Label: Kevin Bennett (KB002)
The Flood	Released: January 2003; Label: Kevin Bennett (KB004)
Live Down Here on Earth (by Kevin Welch and the Flood)	Released: 22 September 2003; Label: Shock Music (B0000DIJM3)
The Late Late Show	Released: 16 January 2006; Label: Kevin Bennett (KB009)
Everybody's Favourite	Released: 2008; Label: Kevin Bennett (KB010)
KB Live (The Rancom Tapes)	Released: 2013; Label: Kevin Bennett
Skin (by Kevin Bennett and the Flood)	Released: 2015; Label: Kevin Bennett
Blood Red Ties (by Kevin Bennett and the Flood)	Released: 2019; Label: Kevin Bennett (KB0104)

== Awards and nominations ==
=== ARIA Music Awards ===
The ARIA Music Awards are presented annually from 1987 by the Australian Recording Industry Association (ARIA).

Year	Nominee / work	Award	Result
2006	The Late Late Show	Best Blues & Roots Album	Nominated

=== Country Music Awards of Australia ===
The Country Music Awards of Australia (CMAA) (also known as the Golden Guitar Awards) is an annual awards night held in January during the Tamworth Country Music Festival, celebrating recording excellence in the Australian country music industry. They have been held annually since 1973.

Year	Nominee / work	Award	Result
2006	"Hello Blue Sky" by The Flood	Vocal Group or Duo of the Year	Won
2020	Blood Red Ties by Kevin Bennett & The Flood	Group or Duo of the Year	Won

=== Mo Awards ===
The Australian Entertainment Mo Awards (commonly known informally as the Mo Awards), were annual Australian entertainment industry awards. They recognise achievements in live entertainment in Australia from 1975 to 2016. The Flood won one award in that time.

Year	Nominee / work	Award	Result (wins only)
2004	The Flood	Country Group of the Year	Won
