= Travelling Heart =

Studio album by TC Cassidy
- Released: 16 September 2022
- Genre: Country
- Length: 30:09
- Label: Rivershack Records/MGM
- Producer: Angus Gill

TC Cassidy chronology
TC Cassidy (1994)	Travelling Heart (2022)

Travelling Heart is the second studio album by Australian singer-songwriter TC Cassidy. It was released on 16 September 2022 both digitally and on CD. It reached number two on the ARIA Australian Country Albums Chart and number 28 on the ARIA Top 50 Albums Chart.

== Track listing ==
No.	Title	Writer(s)	Length
1.	"Ain't Too Late (To Start Again)"	Angus Gill; TC Cassidy	3:29
2.	"Love Hate Love Again"	Gill; Bill Whyte	3:03
3.	"If My Heart Was a Diesel Tank"	Gill; Cassidy	3:37
4.	"April Fools" (featuring Bill Chambers)	Gill	3:31
5.	"Forever Ain't Forever"	Gill; Allan Caswell	3:29
6.	"Lyin' Ass Cheatin' Man"	Gill; Cassidy	3:08
7.	"She Woulda Loved It"	Gill	4:29
8.	"Before I Turn Out the Light" (featuring Anne Kirkpatrick)	Gill; Whyte	3:09
9.	"Make Up for Lost Time"	Gill; Thomm Jutz	3:04
10.	"Travelling Heart" (featuring Angus Gill, Beccy Cole, Adam Harvey, Gina Jeffreys and James Blundell)	Gill; Bill DiLuigi; Kirsti Manna	3:09
Total length:			30:09

== Personnel ==
- TC Cassidy – vocals, background vocals
- John Gardner – drums
- Kevin "Swine" Grantt – upright and electric bass
- Stuie French – electric guitar
- Tim Crouch – fiddle, mandolin, banjo, acoustic guitar, upright bass & band leader
- Jeff Taylor – piano and accordion
- Bobby Terry – pedal steel guitar
- Paul Hollowell – Hammond B3 organ
- Angus Gill – background vocals
- Susie Ahern – background vocals
- Randy Kohrs – background vocals
- Thomm Jutz – background vocals

Production

- Angus Gill – producer, engineer
- Travis Humbert – engineer
- Jeff McCormack – mastering
- Judy Nadin – album artwork

== Charts ==
Chart (2022)	Peak position
Australian Albums (ARIA)	28
Australian Country Albums (ARIA)	2
