= ABC North Queensland =

- Townsville, Queensland; Australia
- Broadcast area: North Queensland
- Frequency: 630 kHz AM
- Branding: ABC North Queensland

Programming
- Language: English
- Format: Talk
- Affiliations: ABC Local Radio

Ownership
- Owner: Australian Broadcasting Corporation

History
- First air date: 26 November 1936
- Former call signs: 4QN, 630 4QN, 630 ABC North Queensland

Technical information
- Transmitter coordinates: 19°15′23.29″S 146°49′17.41″E

Links
- Webcast: Live stream
- Website: www.abc.net.au/northqld/

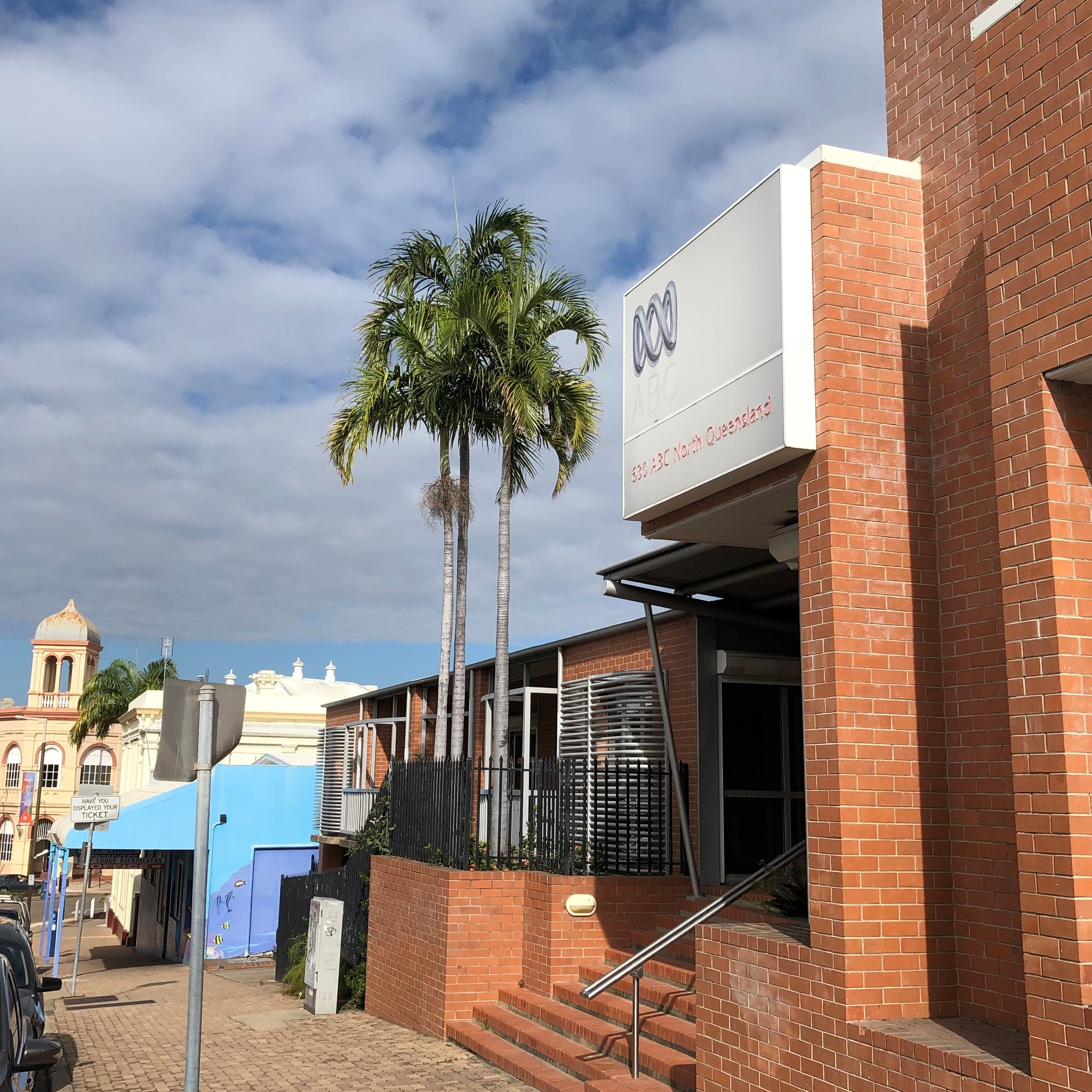
ABC North Queensland studios on Wickham St in Townsville.

ABC North Queensland is an ABC Local Radio station based in Townsville broadcasting to North Queensland, Australia. This includes the towns of Bowen, Charters Towers, Ingham and Ayr.

The station began broadcasting as 4QN in 1936. It was originally a relay station covering the whole of North Queensland with limited local news bulletins. Local program content increased in the 1960s and the station was also the home of regional ABC Television in Townsville, Cairns and Mount Isa.

By the 1980s local program content was broadcast for most of the day, as well as a separate regional breakfast program. 4QN was also the headquarters of the regional network.

John Nutting launched the Saturday Night Country show in 1994 from 4QN which is now broadcast nationally. The Townsville studios were also home to the first Aboriginal and Islander broadcasting in Australia.

== Local Programs ==
=== Weekdays ===
- Breakfast with Michael Clarke – 6:30 AM to 9:00 AM
- Mornings with Susan Graham-Ryan – 9:00 AM to 11:00 AM

Additionally, the station is the originating location of the Early Morning Country program between 5:00am – 6:00am weekdays hosted by Michael Clarke. It is heard on the ABC Local Radio regional network through Queensland and also on the ABC Country digital radio station.

=== Saturday ===
- Saturday Breakfast with Jess Naunton – 6:00 AM to 7:45 AM
- Northern Grandstand with Grant Bell – 8:30 AM to 10:00 AM

When local programs are not broadcast the station relays national and statewide programming from ABC Radio Brisbane.

== See also ==
- List of radio stations in Australia
