= John Nutting (radio presenter) =

Australian radio presenter

John Nutting (born in Margate, England) in 1946, is an Australian radio presenter.

Nutting was host of country music show Saturday Night Country on ABC Local Radio across Australia for 17 years between 1993 and 2010.

In 2010, Nutting announced he was retiring from radio and was replaced by Felicity Urquhart on Saturday Night Country from the end of February 2010.

In 2013, Nutting returned to radio as host of Saturday Breakfast on ABC North Queensland in Townsville. He continued in this role until October 2015.

In January 2016, Nutting commenced work with Australian Country Radio programming and presenting country music, the Australian Country Radio website and associated streaming platforms.

In 2015, Nutting was critical of the ABC's decision to reduce local programming at regional ABC stations such as ABC North Queensland in 2016, suggesting the ABC might as well broadcast local programming for Townsville listeners from Wagga Wagga, New South Wales.

In 2024, Nutting was named "Historic Achiever" by the Country Music Association of Australia (CMAA) at the CMAA Achiever Awards in Sydney, Australia.
