= Wild at Heart (Beccy Cole album) =

Studio album by Beccy Cole
- Released: 15 January 2001
- Genre: Country
- Length: 43:51
- Label: ABC Music
- Producer: Rod McCormack

Beccy Cole chronology
Beccy Cole (1997)	Wild at Heart (2001)	Little Victories (2003)

Singles from Wild at Heart
- 1. "This Heart" Released: 2000

Wild at Heart is the second studio album by Australian country music singer Beccy Cole. It was released in January 2001 and peaked at number 82 on the ARIA Charts. The album was certified gold in 2003.

At the ARIA Music Awards of 2001, the album was nominated for Best Country Album, losing out to Looking Forward, Looking Back by Slim Dusty.

== Critical reception ==
Country Music Australia said; "One of the most truly anticipated releases for some years, the groundswell for Beccy has been growing since her debut self-titled release 4 years ago. During that time thousands have enjoyed her vibrant shows around the country... Now here it is and worth every minute of the wait. Beccy has enlisted many of her friends in the completion of this one, starting with Rod McCormack as producer." adding, "Beccy's never been in finer voice, and the enjoyment of finally recording just shines through this one... A Bonus track is the recording at the Gympie Muster last year with Darren, Adam and Felicity of Dolly Parton's "Do I Ever Cross Your Mind" which picked up the Golden Guitar for vocal Collaboration this year" concluding with "Beccy Cole is a sizeable talent to be reckoned with."

== Track listing ==
1. "This Heart" (Al Anderson, Robert Ellis Orrall) – 3:51
2. "Too Strong to Break" (Beccy Cole, Rod McCormack, Rick Price) – 3:34
3. "Wild at Heart" (Al Anderson, Lari White) – 2:43
4. "Never Sees Anything Through" (Cole, Tamara Stewart) – 3:47
5. "Keep on Rockin'" (Al Anderson, Craig Wiseman) – 3:43
6. "Ordinary Heart" (Emmylou Harris, Kimmie Rhodes) – 2:58
7. "Storm in a D Cup" (Cole, Tamara Stewart) – 3:50
8. "Friends for a Lifetime (Song for Kegan)" (Claire Lynch, Susan Stewart) – 3:03
9. "Mother Knows Best" (with Carol Sturzel) (Cole, Tamara Stewart) – 3:59
10. "Emily" (featuring Gina Jeffreys) (Beth Nielsen Chapman) – 4:55
11. "Lazy Bones" (Cole) – 4:43
12. "Do I Ever Cross Your Mind" (featuring Darren Coggan and Felicity) (live) (Darren Coggan, Cole, Felicity, Adam Harvey, Dolly Parton) – 2:45

== Charts ==
=== Weekly charts ===
Chart (2003)	Peak position
Australian Albums (ARIA)	82
Australian Artists Albums (ARIA)	18
Australian Country Albums (ARIA)	2

== Certifications ==
Region	Certification	Certified units/sales
Australia (ARIA)	Gold	35,000^{^}
^{^} Shipments figures based on certification alone.

== Release history ==
Region	Date	Edition	Format	Label	Catalogue
Australia	15 January 2001	Standard	CD; digital download	ABC Music	2558302922
