= Welcome to My Heart =

Studio album by Angus Gill
- Released: 20 September 2019
- Genre: Country
- Length: 34:12
- Label: ABC/Universal
- Producer: Angus Gill

Angus Gill chronology
Nomad (2017)	Welcome to My Heart (2019)	3 Minute Movies (2020)

Welcome to My Heart is the second studio album by Australian singer-songwriter Angus Gill. It was released on 20 September 2020 on ABC/Universal. The album peaked at #2 on the ARIA Australian Country Albums Chart and was nominated for Traditional Country Album of the Year at the 2020 Country Music Awards of Australia.

== Track listing ==
No.	Title	Writer(s)	Length
1.	"Welcome to My Heart"	Angus Gill; Blue Foley; Lala Deaton	3:26
2.	"Last Minute Larry"	Gill; Bill DiLuigi	3:17
3.	"Origins"	Gill; Lance Carpenter	4:02
4.	"Don't Care How Long It Takes"	Gill; Graeme Connors	3:32
5.	"Fly on the Wall"	Gill; John Scott Sherrill	3:36
6.	"Cornerstone"	Gill; Matt Scullion	3:31
7.	"Bad Women"	Gill; Jim Collins	2:47
8.	"Doesn't Mean I Don't Believe" (featuring James Blundell)	Gill; Scullion	3:27
9.	"We'd Prefer You Pay in Cash"	Gill; Allan Caswell	3:50
10.	"Wish a Storm on You"	Gill; Terry McBride	2:43
11.	"In the Cards"	Gill; Jerry Salley	4:36
12.	"The Present"	Gill; Salley	3:42
13.	"Looking in the Mirror"	Gill; Byron Hill	5:54
14.	"Sidetracked" (featuring Joe Robinson)	Gill; Robinson	3:34
Total length:			48.77

Deluxe Edition
No.	Title	Writer(s)	Length
15.	"My Austrian Friend" (featuring Brennen Leigh)	Gill; Leigh	3:51
16.	"By We, I Mean You"	Gill; Bill Whyte	3:04

== Charts ==
Chart (2019)	Peak position
Australian Albums (ARIA)	47
