= The Scrapbook =

Studio album by Angus Gill
- Released: 24 September 2021
- Genre: Bluegrass
- Length: 33:14
- Label: Rivershack Records/MGM
- Producers: Angus Gill; Tim Crouch

Angus Gill chronology
3 Minute Movies (2020)	The Scrapbook (2021)	Departure & Arrival (2023)

The Scrapbook is the fourth studio album by Australian singer-songwriter Angus Gill. It was released on 24 September 2021 both digitally and on CD and vinyl. It reached number one on the ARIA Australian Country Albums Chart, number one on the AIR 100% Independent Albums Chart and number 19 on the ARIA Top 50 Album Charts. The album was nominated for four Golden Guitar Awards at the 50th Country Music Awards of Australia.

== Critical reception ==
Rhythms declared The Scrapbook "one of the most authentic bluegrass albums ever recorded in Australia". US publication Mother Church Pew said, "With The Scrapbook, Gill's plethora of talents are in the spotlight; he amply proves he's not only a prodigious creator, but a gifted storyteller that puts his heart on the line in every turn of phrase."

== Track listing ==
No.	Title	Writer(s)	Length
1.	"Always on the Run"	Angus Gill; Thomm Jutz	2:27
2.	"Samson"	Gill; Bill DiLuigi; Kirsti Manna	3:50
3.	"Whittling Away" (featuring Jim Lauderdale)	Gill; Lauderdale	3:36
4.	"Caught Between a Rock and a Heartache"	Gill; Rivers Rutherford	3:18
5.	"Feet of Clay"	Gill; Charles Esten	3:39
6.	"Let's Have a Drink (To Not Drinking Again)" (featuring Jerry Salley)	Gill; Salley; Bill Whyte; Aaron Wilburn	3:15
7.	"The Scrapbook"	Gill; Whyte	3:06
8.	"Put 'er There"	Gill; Gary Burr	2:57
9.	"Still Missing"	Gill; Jutz	3:49
10.	"Heartquake"	Gill; Jutz	2:10
11.	"Forget Me Not"	Gill; DiLuigi; Manna	3:07
Total length:			33:14

== Personnel ==
- Angus Gill – vocals, acoustic guitar, dobro and background vocals
- Tim Crouch – fiddle, mandolin, banjo, acoustic guitar and double bass
- Randy Kohrs – dobro and background vocals
- Clay Hess – acoustic guitar and banjo
- Tony Wray – acoustic guitar and banjo
- Thomm Jutz – background vocals on "Always on the Run" and "Still Missing"
- Gary Burr – background vocals on "Put 'er There"
- Georgia Middleman – background vocals on "Put 'er There"

Production

- Angus Gill – producer, engineer
- Tim Crouch – producer, engineer
- Jeff McCormack – mastering
- Judy Nadin – album artwork

== Charts ==
Chart (2021)	Peak position
Australian Albums (ARIA)	19
Australian Country Albums (ARIA)	1
