= Beccy's Big Hits =

Greatest hits album by Beccy Cole
- Released: 17 May 2013
- Genre: Country
- Label: Beccy Cole Music/ ABC Music

Beccy Cole chronology
Songs & Pictures (2011)	Beccy's Big Hits (2013)	Great Women of Country (2014)

Beccy's Big Hits is the first greatest hits album by Australian country music singer Beccy Cole. The album celebrates 20 years since Cole burst onto the national Country Music scene winning the Star Maker award at the 1993 Australian Country Music Awards.

The album was released in May 2013. Upon release, Cole described the album as "a Country Music version of a box of Cadbury favourites!"

== Track listing ==
1. "This Heart" – 3:50
2. "Shiny Things" – 4:00
3. "Lifeboat" (Live) – 3:46
4. "Mother Knows Best" (featuring Carole Sturtzel) – 3:57
5. "Too Strong to Break" – 3:33
6. "Waitress" – 4:20
7. "Blackwood Hill" – 4:51
8. "Sorry I Asked" – 4:43
9. "Clown Song" – 4:12
10. "Rainbows, Dreams and Butterflies" – 3:57
11. "Millionaires" (featuring Kasey Chambers) – 3:47
12. "Girls Out Here" – 4:18
13. "Poster Girl" (Live) – 4:00
14. "Lazy Bones" (Live) – 9:53

== Weekly charts ==
Chart (2013)	Peak position
Australian Country Albums (ARIA)	25

== Release history ==
Region	Date	Format	Label	Catalogue
Australia	17 May 2013	CD; digital download	Ambition Entertainment, EMI Music	AMBITION004
