= Songs & Pictures =

Studio album by Beccy Cole
- Released: 30 September 2011
- Genre: Country
- Label: Core Music/ ABC Music
- Producer: Shane Nicholson

Beccy Cole chronology
| Preloved (2010) | Songs & Pictures (2011) | Beccy's Big Hits (2013) |

Singles from Songs & Pictures
- 1. "Shiny Things" Released: September 2011; 2. "Waitress" Released: February 2012

Songs & Pictures is the sixth studio album by Australian country music singer Beccy Cole. It was released in September 2011 and peaked at number 24 on the ARIA Charts.

At the ARIA Music Awards of 2012, the album was nominated for Best Country Album, losing out to Two Worlds Collide by The McClymonts.

== Background ==
In her 2015 autobiography, Cole said she felt this was a crucial album to her, as her last studio album of original material was Feel This Free in 2005. She read Dolly Parton would take herself into a cabin in the Great Smoky Mountains where she would fast and write songs. Taking inspiration from that, Cole found small cabins, usually near the ocean, river or stream, where she would fast and write. It is the first album in which Cole had written every track.

== Track listing ==
1. "Shiny Things" – 4:00
2. "Waitress" – 4:22
3. "Purple Hills" – 4:20
4. "Women in Me" – 3:56
5. "Only Music" – 3:58
6. "Hello Happiness" – 5:06
7. "Millionaires" (featuring Kasey Chambers) – 3:50
8. "The Singer Sees it All" – 4:24
9. "Gloria's Roses" – 4:25
10. "Here I Go Again" – 2:49
11. "Australian Women" – 4:32
12. "Leave the Light On" – 4:35
13. "Songs & Pictures" – 4:42

== Charts ==
=== Weekly charts ===
| Chart (2011) | Peak position |
|---|---|
| Australian Albums (ARIA) | 24 |
| Australian Artist Albums (ARIA) | 9 |
| Australian Country Albums (ARIA) | 4 |

=== Year-end charts ===
| Chart (2011) | Position |
|---|---|
| ARIA Country Albums Chart | 38 |

== Release history ==
| Region | Date | Format | Label | Catalogue |
|---|---|---|---|---|
| Australia | 30 September 2011 | CD; digital download | Beccy Cole Music, ABC Music | 367502 |
