= TC Cassidy =

Australian country singer-songwriter

- Birth name: Tania Cassidy
- Genres: Country
- Occupation: Singer-songwriter
- Instrument: Vocals
- Years active: 1993−present

TC Cassidy is an Australian country music singer-songwriter.

== Career ==
Tania "TC" Cassidy started performing at 10 years of age and signed with Festival Records at 16 years of age. Cassidy co-wrote recorded her self-titled debut album with Garth Porter. At the 1995 Country Music Awards of Australia, Cassidy was nominated for New Talent of the Year and Female Artist of the Year.

In April 2022, Cassidy released "Ain't Too Late (To Start Again)", her first single in thirty years. It reached number 1 on the Country Songs Top 40 Australian Airplay Charts.

In September 2022, Cassidy released her second studio album, Travelling Heart, produced by Golden Guitar winner Angus Gill. Cassidy said "Travelling Heart is a collection of songs that display many emotions, it's a beautiful ride from start to finish with the perfect balance of happiness, grief, anger, humour and heartbreak. I want to take listeners on a heartfelt journey where they connect to the songs on a personal level". Travelling Heart debuted at number 28 on the ARIA Top 50 Albums Chart and number 2 on the ARIA Australian Country Albums Chart.

== Discography ==
=== Studio albums ===
List of studio albums, with selected details and chart positions
Title	Album details	Peak chart positions
Title	Album details	AUS
TC Cassidy	Release date: 14 January 1994; Label: TC Cassidy, Festival; Formats: CD	—
Travelling Heart	Released: 16 September 2022; Label: Rivershack, MGM (RSREC001); Formats: Digital download, CD, streaming	28

== Awards and nominations ==
=== Country Music Awards of Australia ===
The Country Music Awards of Australia is an annual awards night held in January during the Tamworth Country Music Festival. Celebrating recording excellence in the Australian country music industry. They commenced in 1973.

Year	Nominee / work	Award	Result	Ref.
1995	TC Cassidy	New Talent of the Year	Nominated	
1995	TC Cassidy	Female Vocalist of the Year	Nominated	
2023	Travelling Heart	Traditional Country Album of the Year	Nominated	
2024	"Waiting on a Train" (with Angus Gill)	Bluegrass Recording of the Year	Pending	
