= Departure & Arrival =

Studio album by Angus Gill
- Released: 18 August 2023
- Recorded: 2022
- Studios: Soundpark Studios, Northcote VIC
- Genre: Folk rock
- Length: 27:11
- Label: Rivershack Records/MGM
- Producers: Angus Gill; Billy Miller

Angus Gill chronology
| The Scrapbook (2021) | Departure & Arrival (2023) |

Departure & Arrival is the fifth studio album by Australian singer-songwriter Angus Gill, as Angus Gill & Seasons of Change. It was released on 18 August 2023 both digitally and on CD. It reached number one on the ARIA Australian Country Albums Chart and the AIR 100% Independent Albums Chart.

== Critical reception ==
Americana Highways declared the record "a powerhouse of an album." At the Barrier said, "Instantly enjoyable, well-produced and musically intriguing. The fifth album from New South Wales' Angus Gill ticks the boxes."

== Track listing ==
| No. | Title | Writer(s) | Length |
|---|---|---|---|
| 1. | "April Fools" | Angus Gill | 3:41 |
| 2. | "You Wouldn’t Steal a Heart" | Gill; Billy Miller | 2:39 |
| 3. | "Departure & Arrival" | Gill | 2:49 |
| 4. | "Little Green Man" | Gill; Miller | 3:04 |
| 5. | "Crying Out for Love" | Gill | 3:03 |
| 6. | "Can’t Kiss You Over Coffee" | Gill; Miller | 3:27 |
| 7. | "Start Up The Old Dance Again" | Gill | 3:07 |
| 8. | "Something Fishy" | Gill | 2:53 |
| 9. | "I’m Just Gonna Grab a Sandwich" | Gill | 3:48 |
| Total length: | | | 27:11 |

== Personnel ==
Credits adapted from the liner notes of Departure & Arrival.

- Angus Gill – vocals, acoustic guitar, electric guitar, baritone guitar, papoose, background vocals and percussion
- Billy Miller – electric guitar, acoustic guitar, celeste and background vocals
- Peter “Lucky” Luscombe – drums and percussion
- Bill McDonald – electric bass and upright bass
- Dan Kelly – electric guitar and 12 string guitar
- Cameron Bruce – piano, farfisa organ, hammond organ, mellotron, wurlitzer and theremin
- Daniel Sadownick – percussion on “Crying Out for Love” and “I’m Just Gonna Grab a Sandwich”
- Jeff Taylor – accordion on “Crying Out for Love”
- Susie Ahern – background vocals on “Departure & Arrival” and “Crying Out for Love”
- Sinead Burgess – background vocals on “Crying Out for Love”
- Lucky Oceans – pedal steel on “Start Up The Old Dance Again"
- Nikos Giousef – musical saw on “Something Fishy”
- Tim Crouch – octave fiddle on “Something Fishy”
- Clayton Doley – hammond organ on “I’m Just Gonna Grab a Sandwich”
- Max Abrams – saxophone on “I’m Just Gonna Grab a Sandwich”

Production

- Angus Gill – producer, engineer
- Billy Miller – producer
- Andrew Hehir – engineer
- William Bowden – mastering
- Judy Nadin – album artwork

== Charts ==
| Chart (2021) | Peak position |
|---|---|
| Australian Country Albums (ARIA) | 1 |
