= Live @ Lizotte's =

Live album by Beccy Cole
- Released: 12 October 2007
- Recorded: Lizotte's restaurant, NSW, Australia
- Genre: Country
- Label: Beccy Cole Music, ABC Country
- Producer: Rod McCormack

Beccy Cole chronology
Feel This Free (2005)	Live @ Lizotte's (2007)	Preloved (2010)

Singles from Live @ Lizotte's
- 1. "Lifeboats" Released: 2007

Live @ Lizotte's is the first live album by Australian country music singer Beccy Cole. The album was released in October 2007 and peaked at number 63 on the ARIA Charts in January 2008.

A spokesman for her record label said "The album presents Beccy at her finest; on stage at Lizottes, Beccy performed her most loved songs and some new ones and some unforgettable covers."

== Background ==
Cole says she came up with the concept of recording a live album was to get some of the stories behinds the songs right.

== Reception ==
Susan Jarvis from Capital News said; "Beccy has managed to capture the infectious fun, irreverence, slightly risqué humour and warmth of her live performance and "bottle" it – on her first live album. If you've never seen Beccy live, this album really does convey what it's about, and Live @ Lizotte's is bound to boost her ticket sales." adding "This is everything a live album should be, and more. It's warm and funny, intimate and moving. And it really does make you feel like you’re part of a dynamic live show."

== Singles ==
"Lifeboats" was released as a single from the album. The lyrics question feminism and ask in the case of a sinking ship, If women still get to use the lifeboats first.

== Track listing ==
CD

1. "Men Don't Dance" – 3:03
2. "Better Woman" – 2:38
3. "Intro to Blackwood Hill" – 0:52
4. "Blackwood Hill" – 4:48
5. "Intro to Lifeboat" – 0:33
6. "Lifeboat" – 3:50
7. "Intro to Sorry I Asked" – 0:39
8. "Sorry I Asked" – 4:38
9. "Intro to Girls Out Here" – 3:21
10. "Girls out Here" – 4:44
11. "Intro to Opposite Prayers" – 0:52
12. "Opposite Prayers" – 4:02
13. "Intro to Those Memories of You" – 0:50
14. "Those Memories of You" (featuring Kasey Chambers) – 4:01
15. "Intro to Natural Woman" – 1:00
16. "Natural Woman" – 3:11
17. "Lazy Bones" – 10:00
18. "Intro to Galleries of Pink Galahs" – 0:57
19. "Galleries of Pink Galahs" (featuring Gina Jeffreys and Sara Storer) – 4:12
20. "Intro to What's Up" – 1:00
21. "What's Up?" – 5:55
22. "Say You Love Me" – 4:31
23. "Poster Girl (Wrong Side of the World)" – 4:08

DVD

1. "Lifeboat"
2. "Those Memories of You"
3. "Galleries of Pink Galahs"
4. "What's Up"
5. "Poster Girl (Wrong Side of the World)"
6. "Say You Love Me"
7. "Strong Enough to Bend"

== Charts ==
=== Weekly charts ===
Chart (2007–08)	Peak position
Australian Albums (ARIA)	63
Australian Artist Albums (ARIA)	18
Australian Country Albums (ARIA)	9

=== Year-end charts ===
Chart (2008)	Position
ARIA Country Albums Chart	40

== Musicians ==
- Rod McCormack, Mal Lancaster – drums
- Michael Rose – pedal steel and dobro
- James Gillard – bass
- Mick Albeck – fiddle.

== Release history ==
Region	Date	Format	Label	Catalogue
Australia	12 October 2007	CD / DVD; digital download	Beccy Cole Pty Ltd, ABC Country	5144227742
