= 3 Minute Movies =

Studio album by Angus Gill & Seasons of Change
- Released: 25 September 2020
- Genre: Country; folk rock
- Length: 34:12
- Label: Rivershack Records/MGM
- Producer: Angus Gill

Angus Gill & Seasons of Change chronology
Welcome to My Heart (2019)	3 Minute Movies (2020)	The Scrapbook (2021)

3 Minute Movies is the third studio album by Australian singer-songwriter Angus Gill. It is a collaboration with the members of the Paul Kelly band, released under Angus Gill & Seasons of Change. It was released on 25 September 2020 both digitally and on CD. 3 Minute Movies reached #1 on the AIR Album Charts, #2 on the ARIA Australian Country Album Charts, #8 on the ARIA Australian Album Charts and #28 on the ARIA Top 50 Album Charts. Angus Gill & Seasons of Change were nominated for Group or Duo of the Year and Alt Country Album of the Year at the 49th Country Music Awards of Australia.

== Critical reception ==
Professional ratings
Review scores
Source	Rating
The Australian	4/5 stars

Phil Stafford of The Australian said the album "typifies its title with self-contained, radio-friendly tales of resetting, expressing identity and savouring the similarly indelible aftertaste of romance." Stafford praised Gill’s songwriting, "Gill's songcraft betrays a precocity that blooms" and backing from Paul Kelly's band "strikes a balance between sympathetic and stepping out."

== Track listing ==
No.	Title	Writer(s)	Length
1.	"3 Minute Movie"	Angus Gill; Alissa Moreno	3:31
2.	"Hey Underdog"	Gill; Jeffrey Steele; Vicky McGehee; Providence David	3:20
3.	"The New Old Me" (featuring Steve Earle)	Gill; Allan Caswell	3:39
4.	"Almost Alright"	Gill; Bill DiLuigi; Kirsti Manna	3:34
5.	"Coming of Age"	Gill; Bob DiPiero	3:20
6.	"Skin Story"	Gill; Nick Wolfe	3:14
7.	"Daylight Robbery"	Gill; Mark Lizotte	3:37
8.	"Acquainted With the Night"	Gill	4:22
9.	"Temporary Fix"	Gill; Will Hoge	3:28
10.	"You and Me and Monopoly"	Gill; Trey Bruce	2:26
11.	"3 Minute Movie (Reprise)"	Gill; Moreno	1:11
Total length:			34:12

== Personnel ==
- Angus Gill – acoustic guitar, vocals, background vocals
- Peter Luscombe – drums
- Bill McDonald – bass
- Cameron Bruce – piano, Fender Rhodes, Farfisa, Hammond organ
- Ashley Naylor – electric guitar
- Dan Kelly – electric guitar
- Susie Ahern – background vocals
- Jaron Mossman – percussion
- Max Abrams – saxophones on “Acquainted With The Night”
- Lorne McDougall – bagpipes on “Skin Story”
- Mark Lizotte – acoustic and electric guitars, bass, mandolin, percussion, background vocals on “Daylight Robbery”

Production notes:

- Angus Gill – producer, engineer
- Lucas James – engineer
- Jeff McCormack – mastering
- Judy Nadin – album artwork
- Dan Stanley-Freeman – design

== Charts ==
Chart (2020)	Peak position
Australian Albums (ARIA)	28
