= Bella (Australian band) =

Australian country music trio

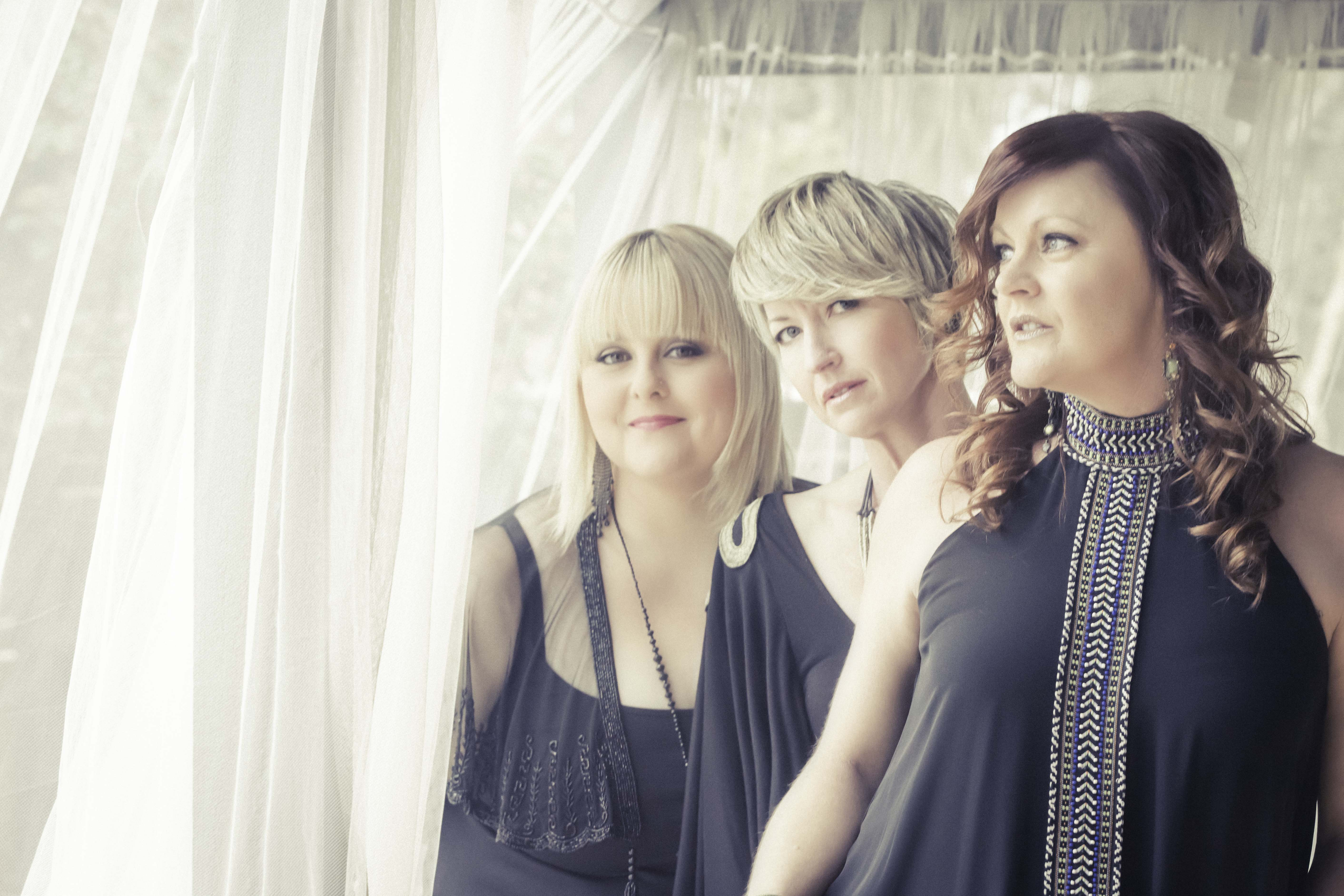
- L to R: Bowtell, O'Shea and Ballantyne in July 2015

Background information
- Origin: Newcastle, New South Wales, Australia
- Genres: Country
- Years active: 2002–2006, 2015
- Labels: Sony
- Past members: Kate Ballantyne; Lyn Bowtell; Karen O'Shea

Bella were an Australian country music trio from Newcastle. They were formed as Anam Cara by Kate Ballantyne, Lyn Bowtell and Karen O'Shea (all on vocals) in 2002. They issued a sole album, Gravity (January 2005) before disbanding in 2006.

== History ==
Bella were formed in 2002 as Anam Cara (Celtic for "soul mate") in Newcastle as a country music trio by Kate Ballantyne Lyn Bowtell and Karen O'Shea. All three had previously entered the Star Maker Quest at Tamworth Country Music Festival: Bowtell won in 1997, Ballantyne won in 1998 and O'Shea was a grand finalist in 1999.

Ballantyne (born Katrina Aitken, February 1970, Newcastle), on guitar and vocals, had started performing professionally from 14 years-old and issued her debut single in 1991. She released three solo albums, Tomorrow's Girl (1994), Too Hot to Handle (1998) and Flowers for Love (1999). Bowtell and O'Shea had both graduated from the CMAA College of Country Music in 1997. Bowtell (born 1976 or 1977, Kleinton, Queensland) on vocals and guitar, was a member of Southern Steel, which issued their debut album, Headed South, in 1996. Bowtell and O'Shea co-wrote "I Can Fly", which appeared on the Various Artists' compilation album, Outback Adventures (1997). Upon leaving secondary school O'Shea started her career in her home town, Darwin, Northern Territory, with a band the Sublimes. As of February 2002 O'Shea and her fiancée, Leo Skliros, owned a mango plantation south of Darwin. Her debut album, Wish, appeared in that year.

By mid-2003 Anam Cara had changed their name to Bella. Their debut single, "Tumblin' Down", was issued in September of that year on an extended play of the same name via AgSongs. The label's owners, Barry Harley and Kate Nugent, had caught their show at The Brewery in Newcastle. "Tumblin' Down" was co-written by American country musicians, Melissa Peirce and Jerry Salley. Their second single, "About a Girl", was written by Bowtell and appeared in 2004. They have won Golden Guitars for Vocal Group or Duo of the Year in 2004 and 2005 for the songs "Tumblin' Down" and "About a Girl" at the Country Music Awards of Australia.

Bella released their debut album, Gravity, on 17 January 2005 via Sony/BMG. It provided the group's third single, "She Still Believes", in August of that year, which reached the ARIA Singles Chart top 100. The track had been co-written by Bowtell with Salley. Bella disbanded in 2006 due to problems with their label and changes in their personal lives. Bowtell's father died, and she studied a Bachelor of Music; Ballantyne became a school teacher; O'Shea and Skliros had married and moved to the Hunter Valley where they raised their two children. Bowtell resumed her music career in 2011.

In October 2014 Bella reunited and undertook the She Still Believes Farewell Tour into 2015. They performed their final show at the Tamworth Country Music Festival in January 2016.

== Discography ==
=== Albums ===
Title	Details	Peak chart positions
Title	Details	AUS
Gravity	Released: 17 January 2005; Label: Sony Music Australia/BMG (SBME 82876649862); Format: CD	129

=== Extended plays ===
Title	Details
Tumblin' Down	Released: 1 September 2003; Label: AgSongs; Format: CD

=== Singles ===
List of singles as lead artist, with chart position
Title	Year	Peak chart positions	Album
Title	Year	AUS	Album
"Tumblin' Down"	2003	—	Tumblin' Down
"About a Girl"	2004	—	Gravity
"She Still Believes"	2005	99	Gravity

== Awards ==
=== Country Music Awards of Australia ===
The Country Music Awards of Australia (CMAA) (also known as the Golden Guitar Awards) is an annual awards night held in January during the Tamworth Country Music Festival, celebrating recording excellence in the Australian country music industry. They have been held annually since 1973.

Year	Nominee / work	Award	Result
2004	"Tumblin' Down" by Bella	Vocal Group or Duo of the Year	Won
2005	"About a Girl" by Bella	Vocal Group or Duo of the Year	Won

- Note: wins only
