= Lyn Bowtell =

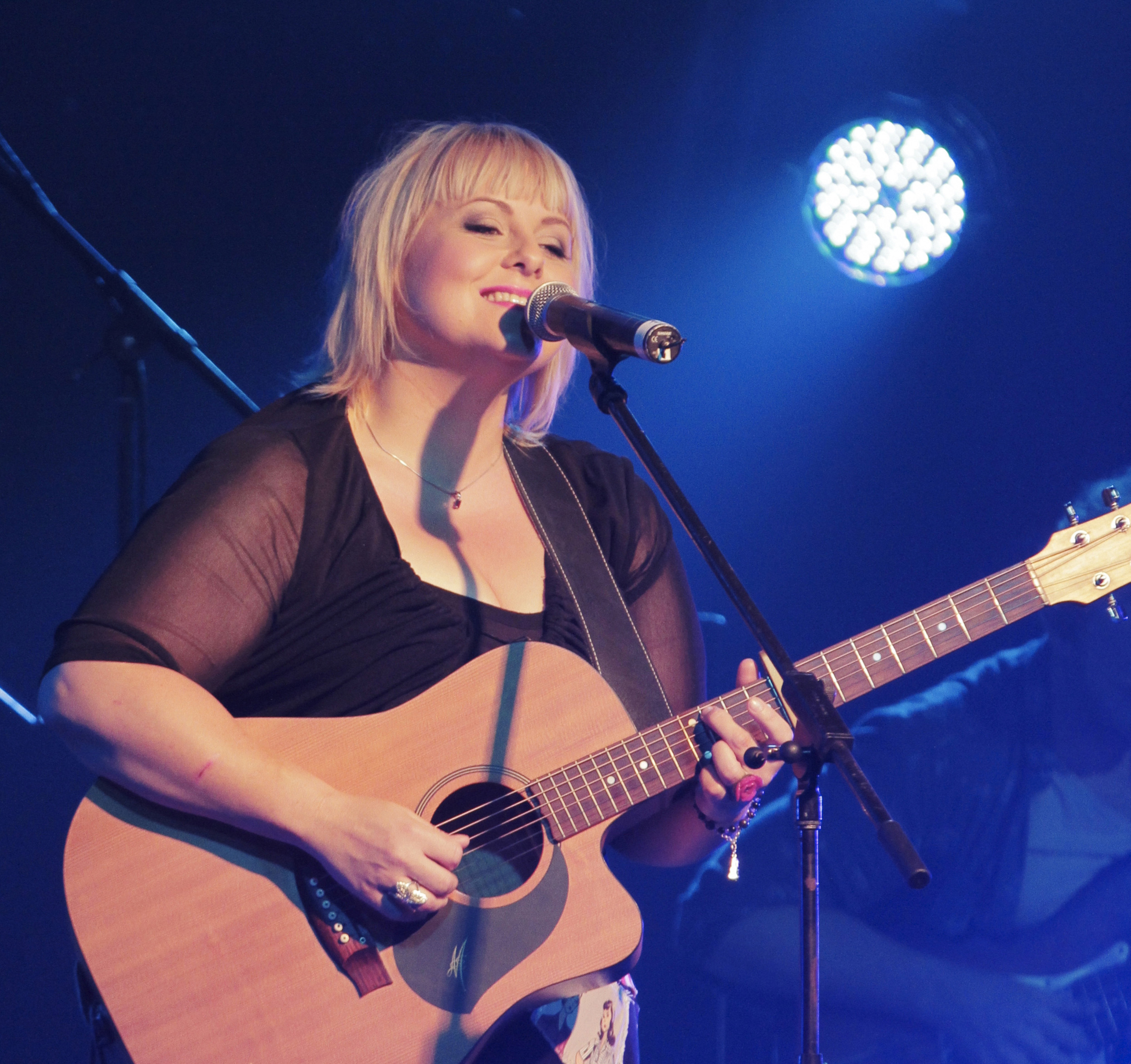
- Bowtell performing at Tamworth Country Music Festival in January 2014

Background information
- Born: Lynette Jean Bowtell; 29 April 1977 (age 49); Kleinton, Queensland, Australia
- Genres: Country, Alternative Country
- Occupation: Singer-songwriter
- Instruments: Vocals, guitar
- Years active: 1996−present
- Label: BMG Sony/BMG WJO Maven/Sony Checked Label Services/Kobalt
- Formerly of: Bennett Bowtell Urquhart; Bella
- Website: lynbowtell.com

Lyn Bowtell (born 29 April 1977) is an Australian singer-songwriter from Kleinton, Queensland. She has won ten Golden Guitar Awards at the Country Music Awards of Australia. She was primary songwriter and singer for the pop country trio, Bella (2002–2006). Bowtell has to date released five solo albums, Heart's in the Country (September 2002), Secret Songs (March 2012),Heart of Sorrow (July 2014), an EP 'Calling You' (September 2017), Wiser (May 2022) and Paper Cuts (September 2025. Alongside her solo career, she was also a member of Australian super-group, Bennett Bowtell Urquhart, with Kevin Bennett (see the Flood) and Felicity Urquhart.

== Life and career ==
=== Early life ===
Bowtell is the daughter of Noel Rodney Bowtell (c. 1943 – May 2005), a farmer and baker, and Glenys Fay, from Kleinton on the Darling Downs. Bowtell has two older siblings. Her father Noel sang and played accordion, piano, organ and drums with his father and brother at old time dances. Glenys sings and plays piano accordion, auto-harp and bag-pipes. On Australia Day 2019, Glenys was awarded a Medal of the Order of Australia for "service to conservation and the environment".

Bowtell first performed at country music clubs in the Darling Downs. At age 13 she competed in her first country music festival talent quest: The Big Doo at Brymaroo. As a teenager she was active in Dalby and Toowoomba Country music clubs. Her parents drove her to numerous talent quests along the east coast, including at Charters Towers CMF and at Gympie Muster.

=== 1995–2001: Southern Steel and Star Maker ===
In 1995 Bowtell won the Queensland Champion of Champions award. In 1996 Bowtell formed the group Southern Steel in Toowoomba, with Mik McCartin on drums, Duncan Toombs on guitar, and his brother Andrew Toombs on bass guitar (later replaced by Joel Oakhill). Southern Steel released their debut studio album, Headed South, in that same year. The title track, "Headed South", was written by Bowtell.

In January 1997 Bowtell attended the CMAA College of Country Music, held over two weeks, in Tamworth ahead of its annual Country Music Festival where she won the Star Maker Quest for "Headed South". Following that win, she released two singles, "The One You Love" and "Searching for Jane" (both in 1997), the latter was co-written with Margie Mason. In the next year Bowtell won the Female Vocal section of 1998 Victorian Country Music Awards. She continued to tour with Southern Steel until they disbanded in 2001. Bowtell then relocated to Central Coast, New South Wales.

=== 2002–2006: Bella ===
Bowtell issued her debut solo album, Heart's in the Country, on 30 September 2002 via Canberra's ACMEC label. In 2002 Bowtell joined friends Kate Ballantyne and Karen O'Shea to form country pop vocal trio, Bella in Newcastle. The group were active until 2006, they released a studio album, Gravity and won two Golden Guitar awards for Vocal Group or Duo of the Year in 2004 and 2005. The latter win was for "About a Girl", written by Bowtell.

After Bella disbanded in 2006, Bowtell had a break from her music career and undertook a Bachelor of Music and Bachelor of Education degree at University of Newcastle.

=== 2011–present: Solo career, The Voice and Bennett Bowtell Urquhart ===
In 2011 Bowtell resumed her musical career, supporting Beccy Cole on the latter's Australian tour, as a rhythm guitarist, backing singer and opening act. In March 2012 Bowtell released her second solo studio album, Secret Songs, which was produced by Sean Rudd via WJO Distribution. The album track, "Sailing", featured vocals by American singer and folk legend, Janis Ian; the pair co-wrote the song. On the ARIA Charts, Secret Songs peaked at No. 95 on the Top 100 Physical Albums, No. 8 on the Hitseekers Albums and No. 15 on the Country Albums.

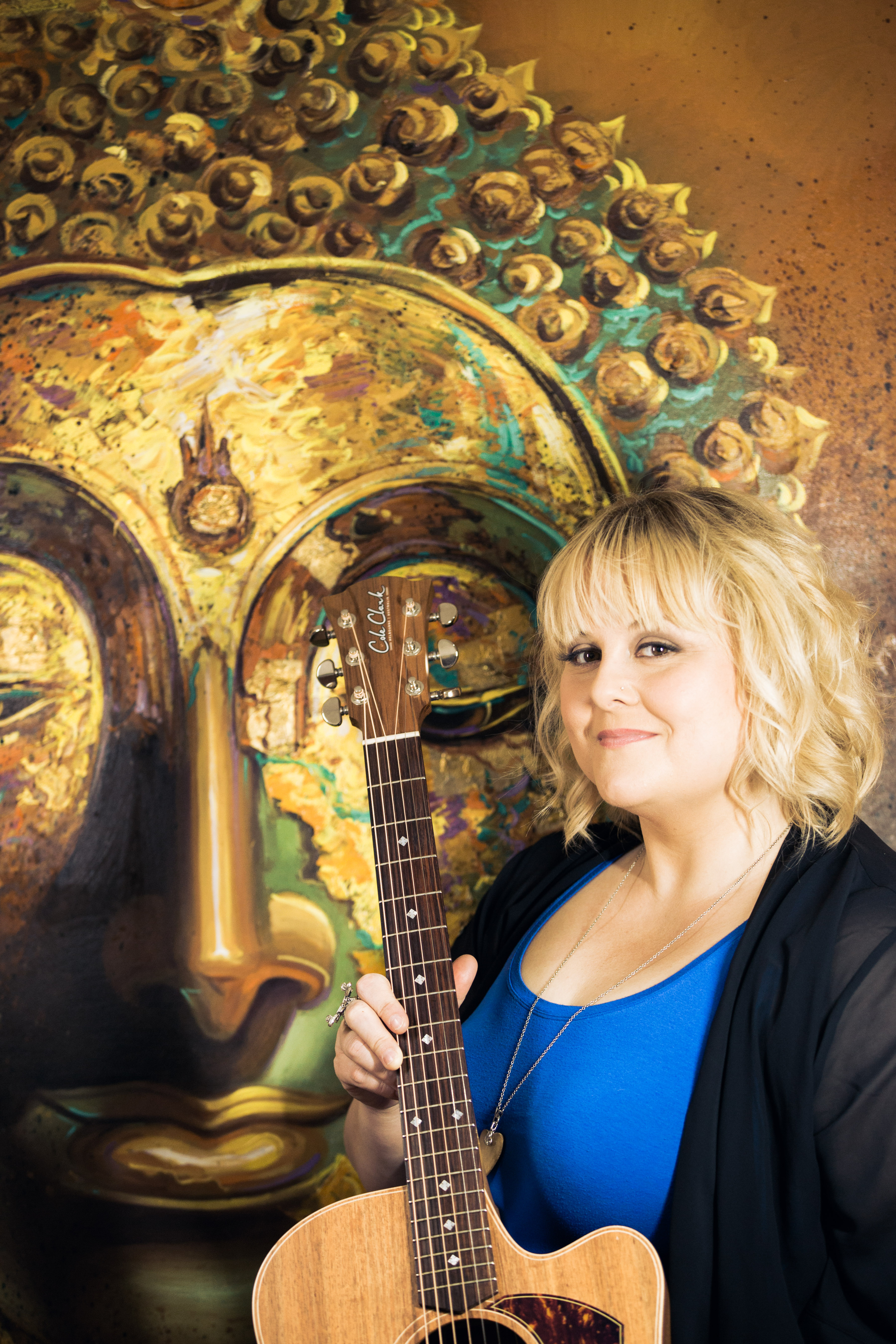
Bowtell, July 2015

Bowtell's third album, Heart of Sorrow, followed in July 2014. It was produced by Shane Nicholson and released via Maven /Sony Music Entertainment Australia. On the ARIA Charts, Heart of Sorrow, reached No. 58 on the Top 100 Physical Albums, No. 6 on the Hitseekers Albums and No. 5 on the Country Albums. At the 2015 Golden Guitars, Country Music Awards of Australia, the singer-songwriter won Best Alternative Country Album for Heart of Sorrow. She was also nominated for Best Female Artist and Vocal Collaboration of the Year.

In 2015 Bowtell was appointed Artistic Director of the CMAA Academy of Country Music. Also in that year Bowtell formed the super-group, Bennett Bowtell Urquhart with Kevin Bennett (also in the Flood) on vocals and guitar and Felicity Urquhart. During 2016 she co-wrote "F U Cancer", a single by Catherine Britt featuring Bowtell, Beccy Cole, Kasey Chambers, Josh Pyke, Wes Carr and Wendy Matthews. In January 2017 Bowtell was nominated for seven Golden Guitars at the Country Music Awards of Australia, five with her group Bennett, Bowtell & Urquhart and two for collaborations with Adam Harvey and with Britt. Bennett, Bowtell & Urquhart won Best Group or Duo and Alternative Country Album of the Year while Bowtell, Britt and Cole (et Al) won Vocal Collaboration.

On 7 May 2017 Bowtell successfully auditioned for The Voice Australia (season six), with her version of "Fields of Gold", and had all four judges turn their chairs. Bowtell joined Team George, but was eliminated in the battle rounds with her rendition of "Why". She subsequently released a six-track EP, Calling You (September 2017), including the songs "Fields of Gold" and "Let It Be", which she had performed on ‘The Voice’. The EP peaked at No. 4 on the Hitseekers Albums and No. 13 on the Country Albums charts.

In January 2019 Bennett, Bowtell & Urquhart were nominated for three Golden Guitars at the Country Music Awards of Australia and won Vocal Collaboration of the Year for "Every Hello". In September of that year Bowtell joined Luke O'Shea on the song "Sing Me a Story", which won both Vocal Collaboration and Heritage Song of the Year at the 2020 CMAA Awards.

In January 2022, Bowtell was inducted into the 'Hands of Fame' at the Tamworth Country Music Festival. On 13 May 2022, Bowtell released her 4th solo album Wiser. In January 2023 Bowtell was nominated for three Golden Guitar Awards at the Country Music Awards of Australia, in the Contemporary Country Album of the Year, Vocal Collaboration (with Shane Nicholson) and Female Artist of the Year categories for her Wiser album, winning the Award for Contemporary Country Album of the Year.

In January 2025 Bowtell released the single "Paper Cut" from her latest album Paper Cuts, released in September 2025.

In January 2026, Bowtell was inducted into the 'Galaxy of Stars' at the Tamworth Country Music Festival, and her plaque was installed in the forecourt of the TRECC in Tamworth.

The Voice performances and results (2017)
Episode	Song	Original artist	Result
Audition	"Fields of Gold"	Sting	Through to The Knockouts
The Knockouts	"Let It Be"	The Beatles	Through to Battle Rounds
Battle Rounds	"Why"	Annie Lennox	Eliminated

== Personal life ==
Since June 2012 Lyn has lived in the Hunter Valley with partner, co-manager and co-writer Damon Morton, a singer-songwriter and live sound engineer.

== Discography ==
=== Albums ===
Title	Details	Peak chart positions
Title	Details	AUS
Heart's in the Country	Released: 30 September 2002; Label: ACMEC (ACMEC006); Format: CD	—
Secret Songs	Released: 23 March 2012; Label: Lyn Bowtell/WJO Distribution (LB003); Format: digital download, CD, streaming	—
Heart of Sorrow	Released: 11 July 2014; Label: Checked Label Services; Format: digital download, CD, streaming	—
Wiser	Released: 13 May 2022; Label: Checked Label Services; Format: digital download, CD, LP, streaming	—
Paper Cuts	Released: 5 September 2025; Label: Checked Label Services; Format: digital download, CD, LP, streaming	74

=== Extended plays ===
Title	Details
Calling You	Released: 15 September 2017; Label: Checked Label Services; Format: digital download, CD, streaming

== Awards ==
=== AIR Awards ===
The Australian Independent Record Awards (commonly known informally as AIR Awards) is an annual awards night to recognise, promote and celebrate the success of Australia's Independent Music sector.

Year	Nominee / work	Award	Result	Ref.
2023	Wiser	Best Independent Country Album or EP	Nominated	

=== APRA Awards ===
The APRA Awards are presented annually from 1982 by the Australasian Performing Right Association (APRA), "honouring composers and songwriters". They commenced in 1982.

Year	Nominee / work	Award	Result	Ref.
2013	"Beautiful Liar" (Lyn Bowtell)	Song of the Year	Shortlisted	

=== Country Music Awards of Australia ===
The Country Music Awards of Australia (CMAA) (also known as the Golden Guitar Awards) is an annual awards night held in January during the Tamworth Country Music Festival, celebrating recording excellence in the Australian country music industry. They have been held annually since 1973. For awards won with Bella see here and those won with Bennett Bowtell Urquhart see here.

Year	Nominee / work	Award	Result(wins only)
1995	herself	Queensland 'Champion of Champions'	Won
1997	herself	Star Maker	Won
2015	Heart of Sorrow	Alternative Country Album of the Year	Won
2017	"F U Cancer" (shared with Catherine Britt and Beccy Cole)	Vocal Collaboration of the Year	Won
2020	"Sing Me a Story" (shared with Luke O'Shea)	Vocal Collaboration of the Year	Won
2020	"Sing Me a Story" (shared with Luke O'Shea)	Heritage Song of the Year	Won
2023	Wiser	Contemporary Country Album of the Year	Won

=== Tamworth Songwriters Awards ===
The Tamworth Songwriters Association (TSA) is an annual songwriting contest for original country songs, awarded in January at the Tamworth Country Music Festival. They commenced in 1986. Lyn Bowtell has won one award.

Year	Nominee / work	Award	Result (wins only)
1998	"Searching for Jane" by Lyn Bowtell and Margie Mason	New Songwriter Award	Won
