= Beccy Cole =

Australian country music artist (born 1972)

Beccy Cole OAM
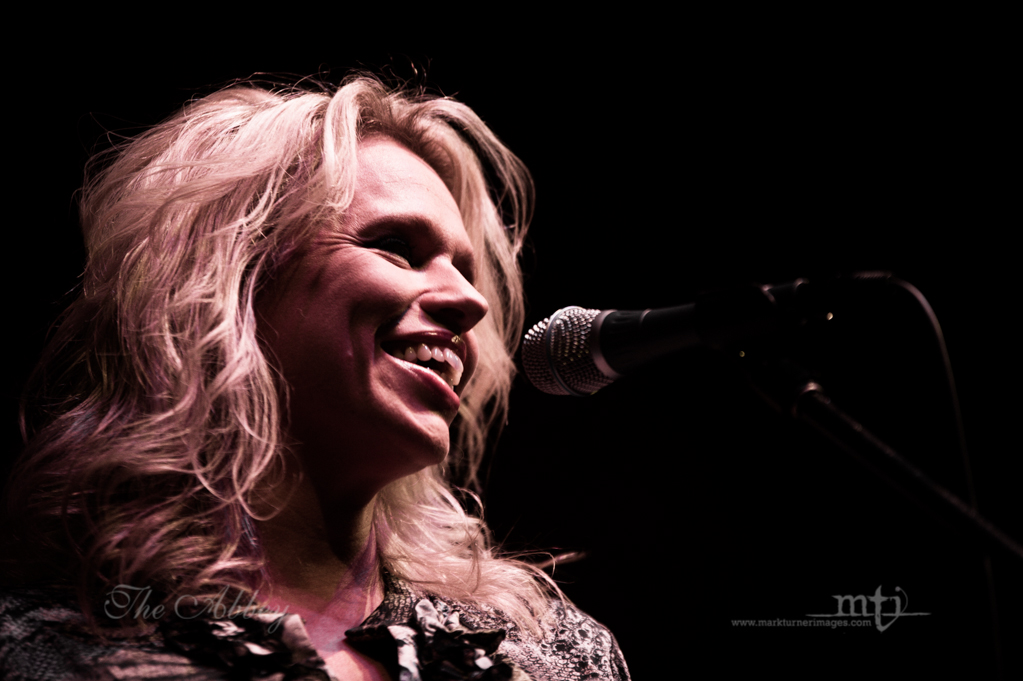
- Cole at The Abbey, Canberra, in July 2013

Background information
- Also known as: Beccy Sturtzel, Rebecca Diane Albeck
- Born: Rebecca Diane Thompson; 27 October 1972 (age 54); Glenelg, South Australia, Australia
- Genre: Country
- Occupations: Singer, songwriter
- Instruments: Vocals; guitar; fiddle; drums; bass guitar
- Years active: 1986–present
- Labels: ABC Music; Columbia; Universal; Warner; EMI; Sony BMG Australia
- Website: beccycole.com

Beccy Cole OAM (born Rebecca Diane Thompson, 27 October 1972), also known in her early career as Beccy Sturtzel, is an Australian country music singer-songwriter and multi-instrumentalist. She has released ten studio albums, with six reaching the ARIA Albums Chart top 40, Little Victories (January 2003), Preloved (September 2010), Songs & Pictures (September 2011), Great Women of Country (with Melinda Schneider, November 2014), Sweet Rebecca (April 2015) and The Great Country Songbook Volume 2 (with Adam Harvey, April 2017). Her video album, Just a Girl Singer (August 2004), peaked at No. 6 on the ARIA Top 40 DVD Chart. Cole has received eleven Golden Guitar trophies at the CMAA Country Music Awards of Australia. During December 2005 to January 2006 she performed for Australian Defence Force personnel in Iraq. Her related single, "Poster Girl (Wrong Side of the World)" (May 2016), expresses her support for the troops. It won the 2007 Song of the Year at CMAA awards, and its music video was listed at No. 1 on Australia's Country Music Channel. In March 2015, she published her autobiography, Poster Girl. Cole is the most awarded Golden Guitar Female Artist of the Year, winning the title five times.

== Life and career ==
=== Early life: 1972–1992 ===
Beccy Cole was born as Rebecca Diane Thompson on 27 October 1972 in Glenelg. Her mother is a country music singer, Carole Sturtzel, and her father, Jeff Thompson, was saxophonist for the Strangers. Cole attended Blackwood Primary School. At the age of 14 years she started performing in her mother's group, Wild Oats, as Beccy Sturtzel. She also performed solo on the South Australian festival circuit. Aside from her mother, Cole's inspirations are Dolly Parton and The Eagles. In 1991, Cole joined a country music group, Dead Ringer Band, led by Bill Chambers; she had met his daughter, Kasey Chambers, in Adelaide in mid-1989. Cole and Chambers performed as a duo at the Port Pirie Country Music Festival, and by 1991 they had busked together on the streets of Tamworth. As a member of Dead Ringer Band, Cole provided rhythm guitar, lead and backing vocals and occasional drums.

=== Career beginnings and first album: 1993–2000 ===
On the advice of her manager she changed her performance name to "Beccy Cole". In January 1993 at the Country Music Awards of Australia she won the Star Maker award, singing Reba McEntire's "Just a Little Love" and Slim Dusty's "Bushland Boogie". As a result of winning the Star Maker award, she had to perform at a special concert opening for Gina Jeffreys. This was the commencement of a lifelong friendship. Cole moved to Sydney in 1993 to pursue her music career and to record a single. She was advised by studio owners Deniese and Martin Cass that her self-penned tracks were not good enough, so she recorded "Fooling' Around", which was written by Perth songwriter Mark Donahoe. The single spent two weeks at number 2 on the country charts. At the 1994 Country Music Awards of Australia, Cole won the Golden Guitar trophy for Best New Talent. and signed her first record deal in 1994. Later that year, she spent four months touring remote Aboriginal communities in northern Australia. In 1995 Cole toured with Slim Dusty. Cole featured on the ABC TV documentary Doesn't Everyone Want a Golden Guitar? and her song "Take Me Home the Long Way" appeared on the associated soundtrack album of the same name. Cole supplied backing vocals for an album, The Circle Game, by country music duo Rod McCormack and Mick Albeck; another guest vocalist was Gina Jeffreys.

In 1996, Cole signed a new record deal with Harvestone Records on the Sony label and began working on her debut album. The album was produced by Rod McCormack. Cole issued two singles, "Hearts Changing Hands" and "Rest in Pieces". The latter single's B-side, "Big Girls", was co-written with Chambers; it was promoted by a music video which featured Albeck as Cole's love interest. On 11 July 1997 her debut album, Beccy Cole, was released and peaked at number 122 on the ARIA Charts in November. The album generated lukewarm responses and Sony decided not to record a second album. Cole married Mick Albeck late in 1997 and gave birth to a son on 2 March 1999. Cole and Albeck divorced in 1999. Later in 1999, Cole began touring with Darren Coggan, Felicity, and Adam Harvey as the 'Young Stars of Country'. In 2000 at the Gympie Music Muster the four artists recorded their live cover version of Dolly Parton's "Do I Ever Cross Your Mind".

=== Commercial success: 2001–2005 ===
Cole's second album, Wild at Heart, was issued on 15 January 2001 by ABC Country and distributed by Universal Music Australia, which peaked at No. 4 on the ARIA Country Albums Chart. It included contributions by Chambers and Jeffreys on vocals, and McCormack on guitars, keyboards, piano, Hammond organ, mandolin, banjo and backing vocals, as well as producing the album. Rosie Adsett at Country Update felt "[she's] never been in finer voice, and the enjoyment of finally recording just shines through this one". While The Sydney Morning Herald's Katrina Lobley noted that Cole "unashamedly examines every corner of a recently broken heart. The album's not entirely miserable – her sense of fun bursts out in wild ditties". At the ARIA Music Awards of 2001 Wild at Heart was nominated for Best Country Album. By November 2002 it was re-issued with a five-track bonus disc, including her single, "Life Goes On". For her gigs she also performs on lead guitar, drums, bass guitar, fiddle or piano. In December 2003 Wild at Heart was accredited with a gold certificate for shipment of 35,000 copies.

On 20 January 2003, Cole released her third studio album, Little Victories, which reached the top 30 on the ARIA Albums Chart and No. 4 on the Country Albums Chart. It was again produced by McCormack, who also provided banjo, dobro, guitars (acoustic and electric), mandola, mandolin and percussion as well as mixing and engineering. On the End of Year Charts – Country 2003, the album reached No. 18. Cole co-wrote eight of its tracks with Tamara Stewart (aka Tamara Sloper). Capital News described the work as by "a more mature, more reflective and more confident" artist. At the ARIA Music Awards that year it was nominated for Best Country Album. In December 2005 it was accredited with a gold certificate.

On 2 August 2004, Cole issued a video album, Just a Girl Singer, which included interviews, live concert footage, music videos and archival footage. The album was written, produced and directed by Lindsay Frazer; which peaked at No. 6 on the ARIA Top 40 DVD Chart. It provided Cole's next single, "Sorry I Asked". In the following year, on 11 April, Cole released her next studio album, Feel This Free, which reached the ARIA Albums Chart Top 100 and No. 3 on the ARIA Country Albums Chart. It includes Albeck on violin and fiddle; McCormack on multiple instruments and producing; and Jeffreys and McCormack co-writing tracks with Cole.

=== "Poster Girl" and Songbirds: 2006–2009 ===
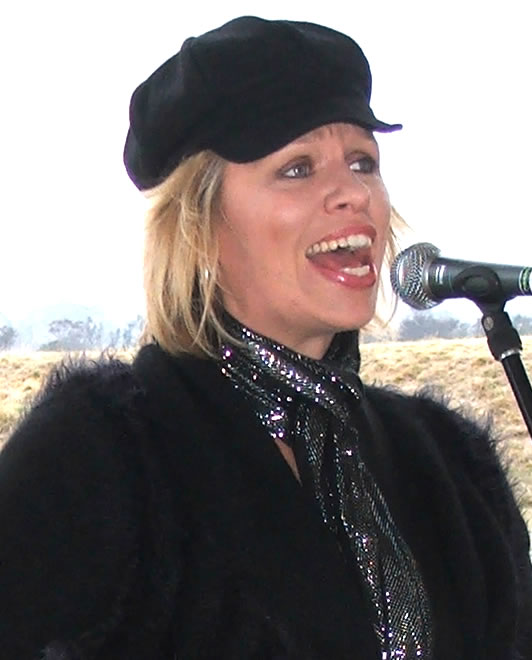
Cole, October 2008, Armidale

During the festive season of December 2005 and January 2006, Cole joined the Tour de Force series of concerts in Iraq and "across the Middle East" for Australian Defence Force "personnel serving in Operation Catalyst". Also performing at the concerts were Little Pattie (patron of Forces Advisory Council on Entertainment, which organised the tour's entertainers), Angry Anderson, Bessie Bardot, Hayley Jenson and comedian Lehmo. They were backed by the Royal Australian Navy Band. Anderson later recalled that "[Cole] struck me from the beginning, I mean she's a born entertainer, and I thought, this chick is as funny as hell. The songs that she was singing, original tunes, and just funny and witty". Upon her return to Australia, Cole received a letter from a disgruntled former fan who objected to her Tour de Force appearances and declared "I've taken your poster off of my wall and I won't be listening to your music any more." In May 2006 she issued a single, "Poster Girl (Wrong Side of the World)" in response, she declared her support for the Australian diggers but not the Iraq War. Also that month she re-released Feel This Free, with bonus tracks, on Warner Records. In January the following year, at the 35th Country Music Awards of Australia, she received three Golden Guitar trophies for Female Artist of the Year, Single of the Year, and Song of the Year for "Poster Girl (Wrong Side of the World)". On 17 March 2007, Cole appeared on celebrity music quiz show RocKwiz, performing "Rockabilly Fever" and a duet with Mark Lizotte on "A Good Year for the Roses".

On 12 October 2007, Cole issued her debut live album, Live @ Lizotte's, with guest appearances by Chambers, Jeffreys and Sara Storer. The deluxe version included a DVD of seven live performances and a behind the scenes documentary. In 2007, Cole, Jeffreys and Storer combined to form Songbirds. A live concert film, Songbirds: You've Got a Friend, was recorded at the Tamworth Country Music Festival on 22 January 2009 and the related DVD was released in May by EMI Music Australia. The DVD went gold in 2009. Susan Jarvis of Capital News noted that the "friendship between the three girls is very much in evidence" where each "performs some of their songs solo, but the three come and go in a wonderfully fluid and organic way, providing a feeling of warmth and spontaneity".

=== Continued success: 2010–present ===
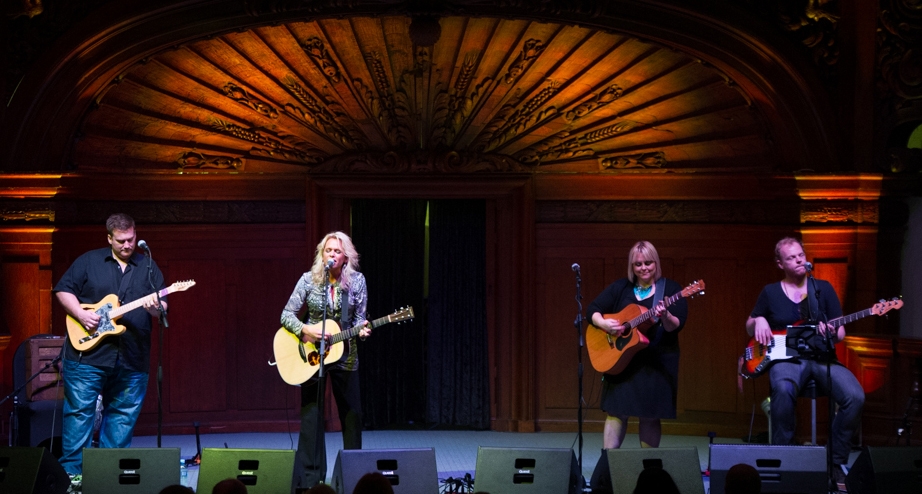
Cole (second from left) on guitar and singing, with her backing band, performing at The Abbey, Canberra, in July 2013.

On 3 September 2010, Cole issued a covers album, Preloved, on Sony BMG Australia which peaked in the top 40 on the ARIA Albums Chart. Included are her renditions of Neil Young's "Only Love Can Break Your Heart", Deborah Conway's "It's Only the Beginning" and Leiber and Stoller's "(You're So Square) Baby I Don't Care". Cole's version of Parton's "Here You Come Again" was released as the lead single, she told Anita Beaumont of The Newcastle Herald that "[it] is the least covered song of Dolly's, and I believed the lyrics stand the test of time". Beaumont felt the album showed "quite a bit of country influence ... but some of these songs weren't originally intended for a country audience. They sound pretty rootsy".

Cole's sixth studio album, Songs & Pictures, appeared on 30 September 2011 and reached No. 24 on the ARIA Albums Chart – her highest position. It was produced by Shane Nicholson (Angie Hart, Catherine Britt). The album includes a duet with Chambers, "Millionaires", which they had co-written; Chambers later recalled "It's really the story of our friendship". At the ARIA Music Awards of 2012 Songs & Pictures was nominated for Best Country Album. In May 2013 Cole released her first compilation album, Beccy's Big Hits. She promoted the album with an Australian tour and invited aspiring artists to perform a song on stage, via the Beccy's Search for a Shiny Star competition. In 2014, Cole released Great Women of Country a duet album with Melinda Schneider was released, a tribute and covers album of Beccy's idols and legendary female country singers and songwriters. She and Schneider performed one of the tracks, Dolly Parton's "9 to 5", on The Morning Show. In 2015, Cole released Sweet Rebecca through ABC Music.

The Australian Broadcasting Corporation announced on 22 January 2021 that Cole would become the new host of Saturday Night Country, its long-running national country music radio program, heard on regional ABC stations and on ABC Country. On 13 February 2021, Cole commenced presenting the program from studios at ABC Radio Adelaide. The show has a history of retaining its hosts for long time periods with Cole having only two predecessors, John Nutting and Felicity Urquhart.

In 2022, Cole was inducted into the Australian Roll of Renown.

In February 2026, Cole announced the forthcoming release of Through the Haze.

== Personal life ==
During the mid-1990s, Cole and Gina Jeffreys were flatmates, while Mick Albeck and Rod McCormack were also flatmates. Cole was married to Albeck for one-and-a-half years (1998–99), writing songs as Rebecca Diane Albeck. The couple have a son, Ricky, who is now a singer-songwriter in his own right. Not long after he was born, Jeffreys and McCormack married each other. Cole's second album, Wild at Heart, dealt with her divorce; the track "Lazy Bones" was written about Albeck and their short marriage. According to Albeck, "it was tough sometimes when we were touring together, living together, bringing up the baby together and having to be on stage together at night. I guess I decided I didn't want the relationship anymore. That was pretty tough for Bec at the time".

By 1997, Cole was living in the Central Coast region with other country musicians nearby including Kasey Chambers, Jeffreys and McCormack, Lyn Bowtell and Adam Harvey: the artists call the local area, Hillbilly Heaven. Albeck, Bowtell, Jeffreys and McCormack have assisted Cole on her albums. As of April 2009, Cole lived in Copacabana, New South Wales. In July of 2012, she revealed that she is a lesbian on the ABC-TV series Australian Story. In November 2012, Cole was the inaugural ambassador for the Adelaide-based Feast Festival, and in the following month, she presented her show The Queer of Country. She explained to Suzie Keen of InDaily that "I was concerned that there may be a lack of understanding towards my sexuality. How wrong I was. What Australians appreciate more than anything is honesty."

By October 2013, Cole was living in Adelaide with her domestic partner, Libby O'Donovan, a cabaret singer. She published her autobiography, Poster Girl, in the previous month. Cole and O'Donovan were married on 2 February 2018 with fellow country musician Tania Kernaghan officiating. The civil ceremony was attended by Adam Harvey, Gina Jeffreys, Kasey Chambers, Lyn Bowtell, Chris E. Thomas, Bec Willis, Kym Warner, Trev Warner and Gina Timms. It was announced on Cole's Facebook page on 5 February 2022 that her marriage to O'Donovan had ended.

== Discography ==
=== Studio albums ===
- Beccy Cole (1997)
- Wild at Heart (2001)
- Little Victories (2003)
- Feel This Free (2005)
- Preloved (2010)
- Songs & Pictures (2011)
- Great Women of Country (with Melinda Schneider) (2014)
- Sweet Rebecca (2015)
- The Great Country Songbook Volume 2 (with Adam Harvey) (2017)
- Lioness (2018)
- The Great Country Songbook Volume III (with Adam Harvey) (2022)
- Through the Haze (2026)

== Awards and nominations ==
Cole was awarded the Centenary Medal in 2001 and the Medal of the Order of Australia in the 2022 Queen's Birthday Honours.

=== APRA Awards ===
The APRA Awards are presented annually from 1982 by the Australasian Performing Right Association (APRA), "honouring composers and songwriters". They commenced in 1982.

Year	Nominee / work	Award	Result	Ref.
2013	"Waitress"	Country Work of the Year	Nominated	

=== ARIA Awards ===
The ARIA Music Awards is an annual awards ceremony that recognises excellence, innovation, and achievement across all genres of Australian music. They commenced in 1987.

Year	Nominee / work	Award	Result
2001	Wild at Heart	Best Country Album	Nominated
2003	Little Victories	Best Country Album	Nominated
2012	Songs and Pictures	Best Country Album	Nominated

=== AIR Awards ===
The Australian Independent Record Awards (commonly known informally as AIR Awards) is an annual awards night to recognise, promote and celebrate the success of Australia's independent music sector.

Year	Nominee / work	Award	Result
2019	Lioness	Best Independent Country Album	Won

=== Australian Women in Music Awards ===
The Australian Women in Music Awards is an annual event that celebrates outstanding women in the Australian Music Industry who have made significant and lasting contributions in their chosen field. They commenced in 2018.

Year	Nominee / work	Award	Result	Ref.
2023	Beccy Cole	Artistic Excellence Award	Nominated	

=== Country Music Awards of Australia ===
The Country Music Awards of Australia (CMAA) (also known as the Golden Guitar Awards) is an annual awards night held in January during the Tamworth Country Music Festival, celebrating recording excellence in the Australian country music industry. They have been held annually since 1973.

Year	Nominee / work	Award	Result (wins only)
1994	Beccy Cole for "Foolin' Around"	New Talent of the Year	Won
2001	This Heart	Female Vocalist of the Year	Won
2001	"Do I Ever Cross Your Mind" with Darren Coggan, Felicity and Adam Harvey	Vocal Collaboration of the Year	Won
2002	"Too Strong To Break "	Female Vocalist of the Year	Won
2007	"Poster Girl (Wrong Side of the World)"	Female Vocalist of the Year	Won
2007	"Poster Girl (Wrong Side of the World)"	Song of the Year	Won
2007	"Poster Girl (Wrong Side of the World)"	Single of the Year	Won
2012	"Waitress"	Female Vocalist of the Year	Won
2012	"Millionaires" (with Kasey Chambers)	Vocal Collaboration of the Year	Won
2017	"FU Cancer" (with Catherine Britt)	Vocal Collaboration of the Year	Won
2019	Lioness	Female Vocalist of the Year	Won
2022	Beccy Cole	Australian Roll of Renown	inducted

=== Helpmann Awards ===
The Helpmann Awards is an awards show, celebrating live entertainment and performing arts in Australia, presented by industry group Live Performance Australia since 2001. Note: 2020 and 2021 were cancelled due to the COVID-19 pandemic.

Year	Nominee / work	Award	Result	Ref.
2015	Beccy Cole and Libby O'Donovan – The Cowgirl and the Showgirl	Best Cabaret Performer	Nominated	

=== Tamworth Songwriters Awards ===
The Tamworth Songwriters Association (TSA) is an annual songwriting contest for original country songs, awarded in January at the Tamworth Country Music Festival. They commenced in 1986. Beccy Cole has won three awards.

Year	Nominee / work	Award	Result (wins only)
2002	"Too Strong to Break" by Beccy Cole, Rod McCormack and Rick Price	Contemporary Song of the Year	Won
2007	"Poster Girl" by Beccy Cole	Contemporary Song of the Year	Won
2007	"Poster Girl" by Beccy Cole	Country Song of the Year	Won
