= The Great Country Songbook Volume 2 =

Studio album by Adam Harvey and Beccy Cole
- Released: 28 April 2017
- Genre: Country
- Length: 53:14
- Label: Sony Music Australia

Beccy Cole albums chronology
Sweet Rebecca (2015)	The Great Country Songbook Volume 2 (2017)	Lioness (2018)

The Great Country Songbook Volume 2 is a studio album by Australian country music singers Adam Harvey and Beccy Cole, released on 28 April 2017. The album debuted at number 6 on the ARIA Charts, becoming Cole's highest charting album of her career.

The original album, The Great Country Songbook, was released by Harvey and Troy Cassar-Daley. It peaked at number 2 on the ARIA Albums Chart and was certified platinum.

== Track listing ==
1. "If I Were a Carpenter" – 2:51
2. "Anyone Who Isn't Me Tonight" – 2:17
3. "My Elusive Dreams" – 3:33
4. "Two Story House" – 2:40
5. "You're the Reason Our Kids Are Ugly" – 2:42
6. "Don't Fall in Love with a Dreamer" – 3:41
7. "Jackson" – 3:01
8. "If I Needed You" – 3:35
9. "Louisiana Woman, Mississippi Man" – 2:16
10. "Just Someone I Used to Know" – 2:27
11. "Golden Ring" – 2:58
12. "Storms Never Last" – 3:53
13. "Islands in the Stream" – 4:07
14. "We've Got Tonight" – 3:41
15. "It Ain't Me Babe" – 3:03
16. "Yesterday's Wine" (with Troy Cassar-Daley) – 3:16
17. "Country Heroes" (with Troy Cassar-Daley) – 3:13

== Charts ==
=== Weekly charts ===
Chart (2017)	Peak position
Australian Albums (ARIA)	6

=== Year-end charts ===
Chart (2017)	Position
ARIA Country Albums Chart	7

== Release history ==
Region	Date	Format	Label	Catalogue
Australia	28 April 2017	CD; digital download	Sony Music Australia	88985410882
