= Sweet Rebecca =

Studio album by Beccy Cole
- Released: 10 April 2015
- Studio: Soundhole Studios, Australia
- Genre: Country
- Length: 46:08
- Label: Beccy Cole Music/ ABC Music
- Producer: Shane Nicholson

Beccy Cole chronology
Great Women of Country (2014)	Sweet Rebecca (2015)	The Great Country Songbook Volume 2 (2017)

Singles from Sweet Rebecca
- 1. "Broken Soldiers" Released: 2015; 2. "Sweet Rebecca" Released: July 2015

Sweet Rebecca is the eighth studio album by Australian country music singer Beccy Cole. It was released in April 2015 and peaked at number 19 on the ARIA Charts. For the first time, Cole has written on every one of the album's 12 tracks. Cole said; "For me, every time I write songs it's a very cathartic experience, because I write about my life. I think the more honest you are, the better the song is going to be."

Cole toured Australia in support of the release.

== Critical reception ==
Professional ratings
Review scores
Source	Rating
The Music AU	3/5 stars

Aneta Grulichova from The Music AU said; "Banjos, guitars and incredible vocals are what listeners will find. Lyrically the album is engaging, telling the story of her journey through life; however some are very slow, though heartfelt. "Sweet Rebecca" is nostalgic as she compares her younger and older selves, while "Tea For Three" and "Broken Soldiers" are very moving. "Bumcrack" is an upbeat entertaining track – the title pretty much says it all. Cole is classic country, honest and with a sense of humour, though a few more upbeat songs would’ve been nice."

== Track listing ==
1. "Sweet Rebecca" – 3:18
2. "Damn Fool!" – 3:16
3. "Treehouse" – 3:01
4. "Precious Times" (featuring Sara Storer & Gina Jeffreys) – 3:40
5. "Happy 16" – 4:16
6. "I Love You" – 4:57
7. "Broken Soldiers" – 4:16
8. "I'm Easy" – 4:35
9. "Tea for Three" – 3:46
10. "Off My Chest" – 3:52
11. "Songs Remember Me" – 4:14
12. "Bumcrack" – 2:57

== Charts ==
Sweet Rebecca become Cole's highest charting solo release to date and first ARIA top twenty album.

=== Weekly charts ===
Chart (2015)	Peak position
Australian Albums (ARIA)	19
Australian Artist Albums (ARIA)	5
Australian Country Albums (ARIA)	2

=== Year-end charts ===
Chart (2015)	Position
ARIA Country Albums Chart	23

== Release history ==
Region	Date	Format	Label	Catalogue
Australia	10 April 2015	CD; digital download	Beccy Cole Music, ABC Music	685395
