= Preloved (album) =

Studio album by Beccy Cole
- Released: 3 September 2010
- Genre: Country
- Label: Beccy Cole Music Pty Ltd, ABC Music

Beccy Cole chronology
Live @ Lizotte's (2007)	Preloved (2010)	Songs & Pictures (2011)

Singles from Preloved
- 1. "Here You Come Again" Released: August 2010

Preloved is the fifth studio album by Australian country music singer Beccy Cole. It was released in September 2010 and peaked at number 32 on the ARIA Charts.

In an interview with the Newcastle Herald in December 2010, Cole said; "Preloved is a bunch of songs that helped shape me from birth till now. The original list was more than 200 songs long but I managed to whittle it down to 12, albeit a hard task! There's quite a bit of country influence on the album, of course, but some of these songs weren't originally intended for a country audience. They sound pretty rootsy now."

== Track listing ==
1. "Here You Come Again" (Barry Mann, Cynthia Weil) – 3:05
2. "Insensitive" (Anne Loree) – 4:13
3. "Danny's Song" (Kenny Loggins) – 3:37
4. "It's Only the Beginning" (Deborah Conway, Scott Cutler) – 3:55
5. "You Weren't in Love with Me" (Billy Field) – 4:24
6. "This Shirt" (Mary Chapin Carpenter) – 3:31
7. "You Ain't Woman Enough to Take My Man" (featuring Amber Lawrence) (Loretta Lynn) – 2:10
8. "Secret Love" (Sammy Fain, Paul Francis Webster) – 2:58
9. "Only Love Can Break Your Heart" (Neil Young) – 3:09
10. "Across the Great Divide" (Kate Wolf) – 3:58
11. "Baby I Don't Care (You're so Square)" (featuring Carole Sturtzel) (Jerry Leiber, Mike Stoller) – 1:56
12. "Biggest Disappointment" (Joy McKean) – 3:44

== Charts ==
=== Weekly charts ===
Chart (2010)	Peak position
Australian Albums (ARIA)	32
Australian Artist Albums (ARIA)	10
Australian Country Albums (ARIA)	3

=== Year-end charts ===
Chart (2010)	Position
ARIA Country Albums Chart	47

== Release history ==
Region	Date	Format	Label	Catalogue
Australia	3 September 2010	CD; digital download	Beccy Cole Music Pty Ltd, ABC Music	RMPBCA01
