= Tom Curtain =

Australian country music singer-songwriter

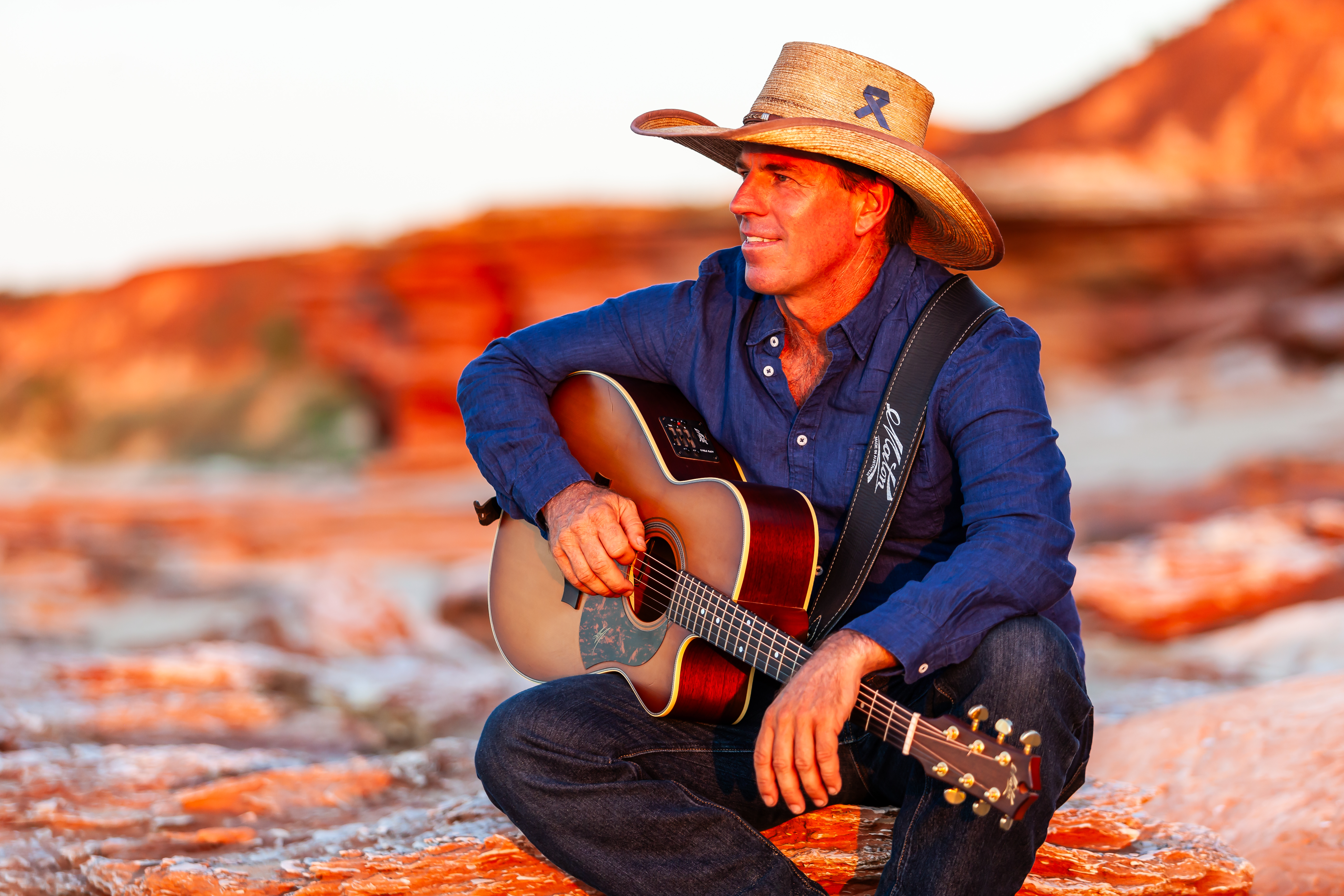
Tom Curtain promotional image in support of his sixth album 'Here's To You' due out 22 August 2025

Tom Curtain is an Australian country music singer, songwriter and tourist operator based in Katherine in the Northern Territory.

== Career ==
Curtain was born in Mildura, Victoria in 1979 before returned his family property Old Boyneside, Kumbia near Kingaroy in Queensland where he attended Kumbia State School. He boarded at Marist College in Brisbane before attending the University of Queensland.

Curtain worked at cattle stations across northern Australia but attributes the beginning of his song-writing to his time working in the stock-camp of Mount Sanford Station in the Northern Territory.

He began the tourism venture Katherine Outback Experience in Katherine, Northern Territory in 2013, that he runs with his wife Annabel. He is well known for performing while riding a horse and sharing his knowledge of training horses and working dogs for life on the land. Katherine Outback Experience won Gold for Tourist Attraction of the Year at the Australian Tourism Awards in 2021, 2023 and 2024.

Curtain has released five albums and toured widely, performing with Sara Storer, The Sunny Cowgirls, Pete Denahy and the Davidson Brothers.

Curtain was friends with Amy ‘Dolly’ Everett and her family, a local teenager who died by suicide after being bullied. This inspired him to write Speak Up, a duet with Sara Storer which reached No. 1 on the iTunes Australian Music Chart.

== Discography ==
=== Studio albums ===
List of studio albums
Title	Album details	Peak chart positions	
Title	Album details	AUS	AUS Artist
Smack Bang!	Released: 2004; Label: Tom Curtain (TC 001); Formats: CD	—	—
Heatwave	Released: 2006; Label: Tom Curtain, One Stop; Formats: CD	—	—
Territory Time	Released: November 2017; Label: Tom Curtain; Formats: CD, digital	—	—
We're Still Here	Released: 15 November 2019; Label: Outback Productions; Formats: CD, digital	—	—
Nothin's Gonna Stop Us	Released: 21 October 2022; Label: Tom Curtain; Formats: CD, digital	—	—
Here's to You	Released: 22 August 2025; Label: Tom Curtain (TC2025/6); Formats: CD, digital	76	8

== Awards ==
=== Country Music Awards (CMAA) ===
Curtain has won several Golden guitar awards at the Tamworth Country Music Awards of Australia.

Year	Nominee / work	Award	Result
2018	"Never Never Land" (featuring Luke O'Shea)	Toyota Heritage Song of the Year	Won
2018	"Never Never Land" (featuring Luke O'Shea)	Video Clip of the Year	Won
2021	"She Gave Us the Song" (with Lee Kernaghan & Sara Storer)	Toyota Heritage Song of the Year	Nominated
2024	Nothing's Gonna Stop Us	Traditional Country Album of the Year	Nominated
2026	Here's to You	Traditional Country Album of the Year	Nominated
2026	Here's to You	Album of the Year	Nominated

=== NT Song of the Year Awards ===
Year	Nominee / work	Award	Result
2018	"Territory Time"	Tourism NT Tourism Song of the Year	Nominated

=== Southern Stars Australian Independent Country Music Awards ===
Year	Nominee / work	Award	Result
2018	himself	Independent Male Artist of the Year	Won
2018	"Never Never Land" (featuring Luke O'Shea)	Single of the Year	Won
2018	Territory Time	Album of the Year	Won
2018	himself	Independent Artist of the Year	Won

=== Adelaide River Country Music Festival ===
Year	Nominee / work	Award	Result
2002	himself	Best Male Vocal category	Won
