= Drew McAlister =

Australian country musician

- Born: Narrabri, NSW
- Genre: Country
- Website: https://www.drewmcalistermusic.com/

Drew McAlister is an Australian country musician. McAlister is one half of the duo McAlister Kemp. His solo album Black Sky debuted at #99 on the ARIA album charts.

== Career ==
McAlister won the 2003 Maton Talent Search at the annual Gympie Muster. In 2007, he won Vocal Collaboration of the Year for "A Little Bit Of Country in Us All" with Allan Caswell. He has since won Golden Guitars for Song of the Year and Heritage Song of the Year. He released his debut solo album, There to Here, in 2008. In 2009 he joined together with Troy Kemp to form McAlister Kemp, releasing three studio albums together. The pair received an ARIA-nomination for their 2012 album, Country Proud. After the duo had an hiatus, and McAlister released Black Sky.

His third solo album, COMING YOUR WAY was released in September 2017. It was nominated for Contemporary Country Album of the Year at the CMA awards of 2018.

His fourth studio album, an acoustic and stripped back album titled, Fabric of Life was released on 2 December 2022

McAlister Kemp reformed in 2022, releasing We Roll On.

== Discography ==
=== Albums ===
List of studio albums, with selected chart positions
Title	Album details	Peak chart positions
Title	Album details	AUS
There to Here	Released: 2008; Label: Drew McAlistair; Format: CD	-
Black Sky	Released: October 2015; Label: ABC Music (4748051); Format: CD, Digital Download	99
Coming Your Way	Released: September 2017; Label: ABC Music (5792637); Format: CD, Digital Download	
Fabric of Life	Released: 2 December 2022; Label: Format: CD	

=== See also ===
- McAlister Kemp

== Awards and nominations ==
=== Country Music Awards of Australia ===
The Country Music Awards of Australia (CMAA) (also known as the Golden Guitar Awards) is an annual awards night held in January during the Tamworth Country Music Festival, celebrating recording excellence in the Australian country music industry. They have been held annually since 1973.

Year	Nominee / work	Award	Result (wins only)
2007	"A Little Bit of Country in Us All" by Allan Caswell & Drew McAlister	Vocal Collaboration of the Year	Won
2014	"Lady of the Land" (written by Luke O'Shea & Drew McAlister) recorded by Luke O'Shea	Heritage Song of the Year	Won
2014	"Lady of the Land" (written by Luke O'Shea & Drew McAlister) recorded by Luke O'Shea	APRA AMCOS Song of the Year	Won
