= McAlister Kemp =

- Origin: Australia
- Genre: Country
- Years active: 2009–2015, 2022–present
- Label: ABC Music
- Members: Drew McAlister; Troy Kemp

McAlister Kemp are an Australian country music duo made up of Drew McAlister and Troy Kemp. Their album Country Proud was nominated for a 2012 ARIA Award for Best Country Album.

== Discography ==
=== Studio albums ===
Title	Album details	Peak chart positions
Title	Album details	AUS
All Kinds of Tough	Released: 2010; Label: ABC Music; Format: CD	93
Country Proud	Released: March 2012; Label: ABC Music (2791965); Format: CD, digital	18
Harder to Tame	Released: January 2014; Label: ABC Music (3753977); Format: CD, CD+DVD, digital	18
We Roll On	Released: August 2022; Label: ABC Music; Format: CD, digital	93

=== Compilation albums ===
Title	Album details
The Best Of: 2008–2014	Released: March 2015; Label: ABC Music (4721185); Format: CD, digital

== Awards and nominations ==
=== ARIA Music Awards ===
The ARIA Music Awards are a set of annual ceremonies presented by Australian Recording Industry Association (ARIA), which recognise excellence, innovation, and achievement across all genres of the music of Australia. They commenced in 1987.

Year	Nominee / work	Award	Result	Ref.
2012	Country Proud	Best Country Album	Nominated	

=== Country Music Awards of Australia ===
The Country Music Awards of Australia (CMAA) (also known as the Golden Guitar Awards) is an annual awards night held in January during the Tamworth Country Music Festival, celebrating recording excellence in the Australian country music industry. They have been held annually since 1973.

Year	Nominee / work	Award	Result (wins only)
2011	McAlister Kemp	New Talent of the Year	Won
