= Bennett Bowtell Urquhart =

Australian County Music

- Genres: country music
- Years active: 2015-present
- Past members: Kevin Bennett; Lyn Bowtell; Felicity Urquhart
- Website: https://bennettbowtellurquhart.com

Bennett Bowtell Urquhart (often abbreviated to BBU) is an Australian country music "supergroup" consisting of Kevin Bennett, Lyn Bowtell and Felicity Urquhart.

== Career ==
In January 2015, at the Country Music Awards of Australia, the trio of Kevin Bennett, Lyn Bowtell and Felicity Urquhart first performed together in what they thought would be a one-off affair. They enjoyed the experience so much they decided to keep going and soon decided to record together. Late in 2015, the trio released their debut single "I Hear Them All" and announced a self-titled debut album would be released in January 2016.

In January 2016, the trio released their self-titled debut album. In January 2017, the album won two Golden Guitar awards at the Country Music Awards of Australia.

In September 2018, the trio released their second studio album, Weeds to positive reviews. Bruce Elder from Sydney Morning Herald called it "A true rarity: glorious harmonies, songs of depth and honesty, set against a rich diversity of country-inflected styles." while Musicologist Bernard Zuel enjoyed "...the lovely interplay of guitar, banjo and ukulele, which matches the interplay of their three voices: Urquhart's gossamer, Bowtell's crystalline and Bennett's grainier."

== Discography ==
=== Albums ===
| Title | Album details | Peak chart positions |
| Title | Album details | AUS |
|---|---|---|
| Bennett Bowtell Urquhart | Released: January 2016; Label: Bennett Bowtell Urquhart; Format: CD, Digital Download | 92 |
| Weeds | Released: September 2018; Label: Bennett Bowtell Urquhart; Format: CD, Digital Download | - |

=== Singles ===
| Year | Title | Album |
|---|---|---|
| 2015 | "I Hear Them All" | Bennett Bowtell Urquhart |
| 2016 | "Goulburn Valley Woman" | Bennett Bowtell Urquhart |
| 2018 | "Love or Money" | Weeds |
| 2018 | "Mountain of Pain" | Weeds |

== Awards ==
=== Country Music Awards of Australia ===
The Country Music Awards of Australia (CMAA) (also known as the Golden Guitar Awards) is an annual awards night held in January during the Tamworth Country Music Festival, in Tamworth, New South Wales, celebrating recording excellence in the Australian country music industry [note: wins only]

| Year | Nominee / work | Award | Result |
|---|---|---|---|
| 2017 | Bennett Bowtell Urquhart | Alternative Country Album of the Year | Won |
| 2017 | Bennett Bowtell Urquhart | Group or Duo of the Year | Won |
| 2019 | "Every Hello" (featuring Karl Broadie) | Vocal Collaboration of the Year | Won |
