= ABC Country =

- Australia
- Frequencies: DAB+; DVB-T: Ch. 203; online

Programming
- Format: Country music
- Network: ABC Radio

Ownership
- Owner: Australian Broadcasting Corporation

History
- First air date: 2009; 17 years ago

Technical information
- Licensing authority: Australian Communications and Media Authority

Links
- Webcast: Live stream
- Website: abc.net.au/country

ABC Country is a digital radio station, available on mobile devices, DAB+ digital radio, digital TV and online. A small number of self-help retransmissions, mainly in Western Australia and Queensland also carry the station's programme stream. It is owned and operated by the Australian Broadcasting Corporation.

== History ==
ABC Country broadcasts Australian country music (about 70% Australian content including about 5% Indigenous Australians country). Also broadcasts Early Morning Country and Saturday Night Country which is also broadcast on ABC Local Radio.
