= Lioness (Beccy Cole album) =

Studio album by Beccy Cole
- Released: 24 August 2018
- Genre: Country
- Label: Beccy Cole Music/ ABC Music
- Producer: Julz Parker

Beccy Cole chronology
The Great Country Songbook Volume 2 (2017)	Lioness (2018)

Singles from Lioness
- 1. "Lioness" Released: 2018

Lioness is the tenth studio album by Australian country music singer Beccy Cole. It was released in August 2018 and peaked at number 31 on the ARIA Charts. In an Australian first, Cole procured the talents of some of Australia's finest female musicians to make the only ever 100% female produced album.

In an interview with ABC Cole said the album is "personal" saying "Lioness is a reflection on my marital status. I never used to write love songs, because I didn't identify with them and it took until age 40 to find love properly... and I'm so much better off and a better person because of it".

At the 2019 Country Music Awards of Australia, Lioness was nominated for Traditional Country Album of the Year.

At the 2019 Australian Independent Awards, Lioness won Best Independent Country Album.

== Track listing ==
1. "Lioness" – 4:32
2. "Coromandel Valley" – 2:52
3. "Wine Time" – 3:47
4. "Are You Coming Over?" – 3:14
5. "They Won't Call It Cheating" – 4:28
6. "My Wife's Got Balls" – 3:37
7. "My God" – 3:11
8. "Look Ma, I'm on CMC" – 2:40
9. "I'm So Excited" – 3:53
10. "The Milliner" – 2:38
11. "Our Souls" – 2:57
12. "I Believe in You" – 3:32

== Charts ==
=== Weekly charts ===
Chart (2018)	Peak position
Australian Albums (ARIA)	31
Australian Country Albums (ARIA)	5

=== Year-end charts ===
Chart (2018)	Peak position
Australian Country Albums (ARIA)	69

== Release history ==
Region	Date	Format	Label	Catalogue
Australia	24 August 2018	CD; digital download	Beccy Cole Music, ABC Music	6787299
