= Little Victories (Beccy Cole album) =

Studio album by Beccy Cole
- Released: 20 January 2003
- Recorded: 2002
- Genre: Country
- Length: 54:51
- Label: ABC Music
- Producer: Rod McCormack

Beccy Cole chronology
Wild at Heart (2001)	Little Victories (2003)	Feel This Free (2005)

Singles from Little Victories
- 1. "Life Goes On" Released: 2002; 2. "Little Victories" Released: 2003; 3. "Men Don't Dance Anymore" Released: 2003; 4. "Sorry I Asked" Released: 2004

Little Victories is the third studio album by Australian country music singer Beccy Cole. It was released in the month of January in 2003 and peaked at number 29 on the ARIA Charts. The album was certified gold in 2005.

At the ARIA Music Awards of 2003, the album was nominated for Best Country Album, losing out to Golden Road by Keith Urban.

== Background and release ==
Cole began work on Little Victories after winning her second Golden Guitar at the 2002 Country Music Awards of Australia. The success of Wild at Heart had meant the label had increased Cole's budget, which enabled Cole and McCormack to gather renown musicians. Cole and McCormack wrote songs together across Australia, including far North Queensland, where he met Graeme Connors and his wife. The album was released to co-incide with the 2003 Country Music Awards.

== Track listing ==
1. "Blackwood Hill" (Beccy Cole, Tamara Stewart) – 4:51
2. "Little Victories" (Cole, Stewart) – 4:07
3. "Life Goes On" (Cole, Stewart) – 4:24
4. "Under the New Moon" (Cole) – 3:53
5. "Sorry I Asked" (Cole, Stewart) – 4:42
6. "That's the Sound" (Cole, Stewart) – 4:14
7. "Single Girl Blues" (Cole, Stewart) – 4:09
8. "This Time" (Cole) – 4:41
9. "Just Shoot Me" (Cole, Stewart) – 3:09
10. "Big Brother" – (Cole) – 4:08
11. "Men Don't Dance Anymore" (Cole, Stewart) – 2:33
12. "What Matters Most" (Stewart) – 4:06
13. "How Wrong Is It" (featuring Adam Harvey) (Cole, Adam Harvey) – 3:13
14. "Wild Turkey" (Pebe Sebert) – 2:41

== Charts ==
=== Weekly charts ===
Chart (2003)	Peak position
Australian Albums (ARIA)	29
Australian Artists Albums (ARIA)	7
Australian Country Albums (ARIA)	4

=== Year-end charts ===
Chart (2003)	Position
ARIA Country Albums Chart	18

== Certifications ==
Region	Certification	Certified units/sales
Australia (ARIA)	Gold	35,000^{^}
^{^} Shipments figures based on certification alone.

== Release history ==
Region	Date	Edition	Format	Label	Catalogue
Australia	20 January 2003	Standard	CD; digital download	ABC Music	1777806
