= Luke O'Shea =

- Born: 28 February 1969 (age 57); New South Wales, Australia.
- Genres: country; folk
- Occupations: Musician, singer-songwriter
- Instrument: Guitar
- Years active: 2001–present
- Website: lukeoshea.com

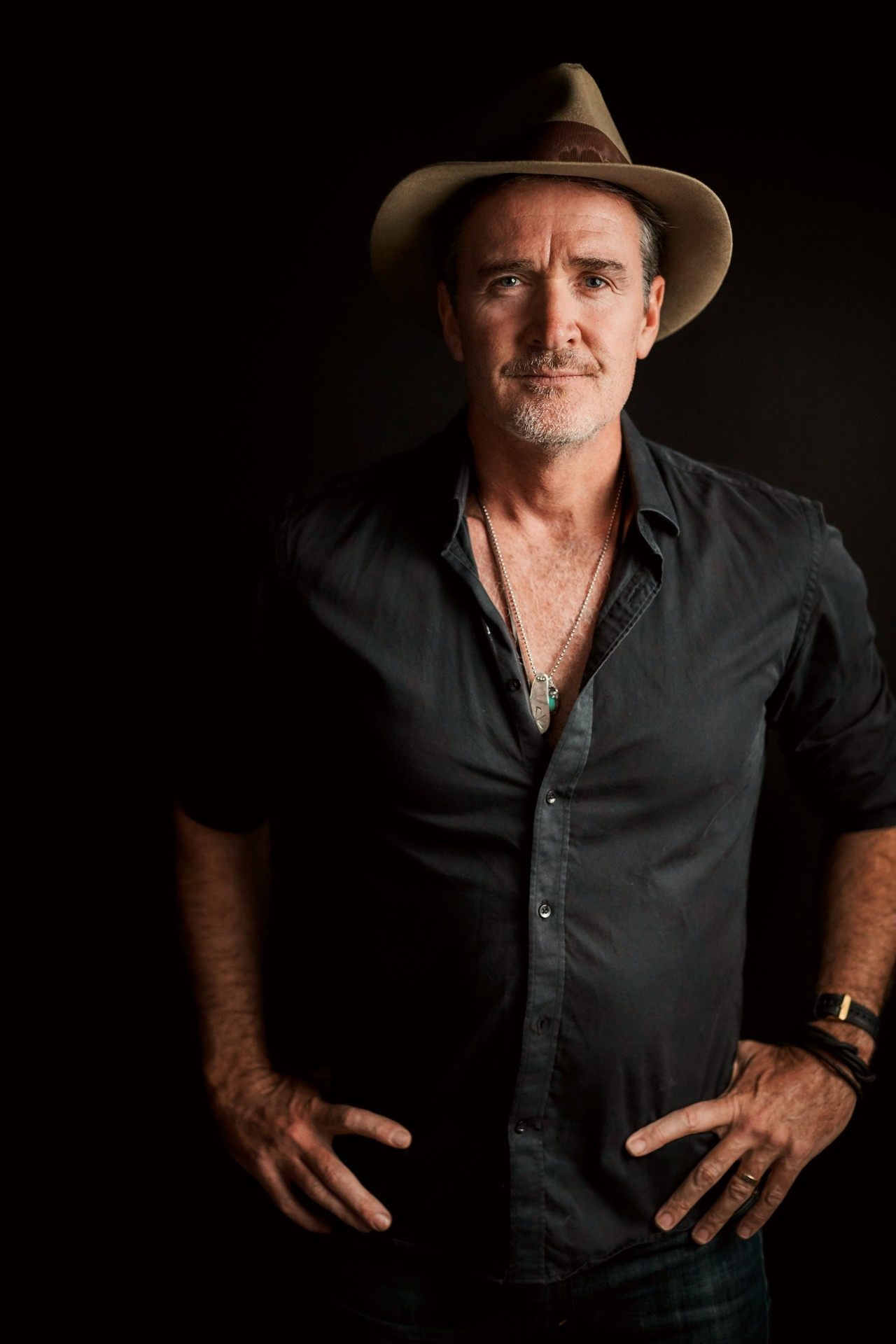
Luke O'Shea, celebrated Australian storyteller, singer songwriter.

Luke O'Shea is an Australian singer-songwriter and storyteller who has written, recorded and produced eight albums and won seventeen Golden Guitar Awards at the Country Music Awards of Australia, including three at the 2015 awards.

== Discography ==
=== Studio albums ===
List of studio albums
Title	Album details
No Day Like Today (as Luke O'Shea & Medicine Wheel)	Released: 2002; Format: Compact Disc; Label: ABC (12422)
Listen to the Words (as Luke O'Shea & Medicine Wheel)	Released: 2006; Format: CD; Label: As U Wish (Los002)
Prodigal Son	Released: January 2008; Format: CD; Label: Luke O'Shea
Drover's Wife	Released: November 2011; Format: CD, digital download; Label: Luke O'Shea
Sing You Up	Released: 14 March 2014; Format: CD, digital download; Label: Luke O'Shea
Caught Up in the Dreaming	Released: 15 January 2016; Format: CD, digital download, streaming; Label: Luke O'Shea
Pinball	Released: 8 June 2018; Format: CD, digital download, streaming; Label: Luke O'Shea
There in the Ochre	Released: 17 January 2020; Format: CD, digital download, streaming; Label: Luke O'Shea
Different Drum	Released: August 2024; Format: CD, digital download, streaming; Label: Luke O'Shea

== Awards and nominations ==
=== APRA AMCOS Song of the Year Awards ===
The APRA/AMCOS Song of the Year is presented annually from 1982 by the Australasian Performing Right Association (APRA), "honouring composers and songwriters". They commenced in 1982.

Year	Nominee / work	Award	Result	Ref.
2013	"Drover's Wife" (Luke O’Shea and Peter Gabrielides)	Song of the Year	Finalist	
2014	"Lady Of The Land" (Luke O’Shea and Drew McAllister)	Song of the Year	Winner	
2015	"Three Brothers (The Great War)" (Luke O’Shea)	Song of the Year	Winner	
2017	"The Old Man's Shed" (Luke O’Shea and John Krsulja)	Song of the Year	Finalist	
2020	"Sing Me A Story" (Luke O’Shea and Felicity Urquhart)	Song of the Year	Finalist	
2021	"Happy Australia Day" (Luke O’Shea and Kevin Bennett)	Song of the Year	Finalist	
2023	"South East Queensland" (Luke O’Shea, Mitch Lynham and Fred Smith)	Song of the Year	Finalist	

=== Country Music Awards of Australia ===
The Country Music Awards of Australia (CMAA) (also known as the Golden Guitar Awards) is an annual awards night held in January during the Tamworth Country Music Festival, celebrating recording excellence in the Australian country music industry. They have been held annually since 1973.

Year	Nominee / work	Award	Result (wins only)
2013	"The Drovers Wife" by Luke O'Shea	Heritage Song of the Year	Won
2014	"Lady of the Land" by Luke O'Shea	Heritage Song of the Year	Won
2014	"Lady of the Land" by Luke O'Shea	APRA AMCOS Song of the Year	Won
2015	Sing You Up by Luke O'Shea	Male Artist of the Year	Won
2015	"Three Brothers (The Great War)" by Luke O'Shea	Heritage Song of the Year	Won
2015	"Three Brothers (The Great War)" by Luke O'Shea	APRA Song of the Year	Won
2017	"The Old Man's Shed" by Luke O'Shea	Heritage Song of the Year	Won
2018	"Never Never Land" by Tom Curtain feat Luke O'Shea	Heritage Song of the Year	Won
2018	"Never Never Land" by Tom Curtain feat Luke O'Shea	Video Clip of the Year	Won
2020	"Sing Me a Story" by Luke O'Shea & Lyn Bowtell	Vocal Collaboration of the Year	Won
2020	"Sing Me a Story" by Luke O'Shea & Lyn Bowtell	Heritage Song of the Year	Won
2021	There in Ochre	Traditional Country Album of the Year	Won
2021	"Happy Australia Day"	Heritage Song of the Year	Won
2022	"Long Way 'Round"		
2022	"Long Way 'Round"	CMT Video of the Year	Won
2023	"South East Queensland"	Heritage Song of the Year	Won
2023	"South East Queensland"	CMT Video of the Year	Won
2025	"Dharawal"		
2025	"Dharawal"	CMT Video of the Year	Won
