= Great Women of Country =

Studio album by Melinda Schneider and Beccy Cole
- Released: 7 November 2014
- Genre: Country
- Label: Universal Music Australia
- Producer: Melinda Schneider and Beccy Cole

Beccy Cole albums chronology
| Beccy's Big Hits (2013) | Great Women of Country (2014) | Sweet Rebecca (2015) |

Great Women of Country is the studio album by Australian country music singers Melinda Schneider and Beccy Cole. It was released through Universal Music Australia on 7 November 2014 and peaked at number 9 on the ARIA Charts.

== Background ==
The collection brings together Schneider and Cole's love of country music. Schneider said she had thought about a tribute album for some time, but the idea to record a joint album was 'a flash of inspiration'. “Both Beccy and I had always thought about doing an album like this individually … but I woke up one morning and the idea wouldn't leave me alone, so I called Beccy and asked: wanna do it together?” Cole said; “They're timeless, they were old even then! These are some of the songs that I drew from to make my own music, to get to pay tribute to them by recording and performing new versions is a great responsibility but such an honour.”

== Touring ==
The pair toured the album between November 2014 and March 2015.

== Reception ==
Ovation Channel said; "Great Women of Country is not just a rich legacy of songs, it is the inevitable collaboration of two of Australia's most accomplished and most experienced country music stars – singers well equipped to reach back and bring forward music that holds a very special place in people's hearts."

== Track listing ==
1. "9 to 5" (Dolly Parton) – 3:27
2. "One's on the Way" (Shel Silverstein) – 2:39
3. "The Night the Lights Went Out in Georgia" (Bobby Russell) – 4:11
4. "Your Good Girl's Gonna Go Bad" (Billy Sherrill, Glenn Sutton) – 2:02
5. "Angel of the Morning" (Chip Taylor) – 4:08
6. "D-I-V-O-R-C-E" (Bobby Braddock, Curly Putman – 2:58
7. "Ode to Billie Joe" (Bobbie Gentry) – 4:21
8. "Stand by Your Man" (Tammy Wynette, Billy Sherrill) – 2:37
9. "Grandpa (Tell Me 'Bout the Good Ol' Days)" (Jamie O'Hara) – 3:41
10. "Mule Skinner Blues" (Jimmie Rodgers, George Vaughan)/ "Rocky Top" (Felice and Boudleaux Bryant) – 2:59
11. "Crazy" (Willie Nelson) – 2:47
12. "Harper Valley PTA" (Tom T. Hall) – 3:15
13. "Banks of the Ohio" / "If Not for You" (Bob Dylan)/ "Let Me Be There" (John Rostill) – 3:54
14. "I Fall to Pieces" (Hank Cochran, Harlan Howard) / "Walking After Midnight" (Alan Block, Donn Hecht) – 4:22
15. "I Will Always Love You" (Dolly Parton) – 4:12
16. "Could I Have This Dance" (Wayland Holyfield, Bob House) / "Tennessee Waltz" (Pee Wee King, Redd Stewart) – 3:46
17. "Blue Bayou" (Roy Orbison, Joe Melson) – 3:59
18. "Jolene" (Dolly Parton) – 2:49
19. "Coat of Many Colours" (Dolly Parton) – 3:05
20. "Queen of Hearts" (Hank DeVito) – 3:20
21. "I Can't Make You Love Me" (Mike Reid, Allen Shamblin) – 5:00
22. "Love Hurts" (Felice and Boudleaux Bryant) – 3:44

== Charts ==
Great Women of Country become Schneider's and Cole's highest charting and first top ten album on the ARIA Chart.

=== Weekly charts ===
| Chart (2015) | Peak position |
|---|---|
| Australian Albums (ARIA) | 9 |
| Australian Artist Albums (ARIA) | 4 |
| Australian Country Albums (ARIA) | 1 |

=== Year-end charts ===
| Chart (2014) | Position |
|---|---|
| ARIA Country Albums Chart | 12 |
| ARIA Australian Albums Chart | 41 |
| Chart (2015) | Position |
| ARIA Country Albums Chart | 13 |
| Chart (2016) | Position |
| ARIA Country Albums Chart | 59 |

== Release history ==
| Region | Date | Format | Label | Catalogue |
|---|---|---|---|---|
| Australia | 7 November 2014 | CD; digital download | Universal Music Australia | 4703930 |
