= Poster Girl (Wrong Side of the World) =

Single by Beccy Cole

from the album Feel This Free
- Released: May 2006
- Genre: Country music
- Length: 4:01
- Label: ABC Country / Universal Music Australia
- Songwriter: Beccy Cole

"Poster Girl (Wrong Side of the World)" is a song written and recorded by Australian country music singer, Beccy Cole, from her album, Feel This Free (2005).

At the 35th annual Country Music Awards of Australia in January 2007, the song won three Golden Guitars for Song of the Year, Female Artist of the Year and Single of the Year.

At the 2007 Tamworth Songwriters Awards, the song won Contemporary Country Song and Country Song of the Year. Cole performed "Poster Girl" at the MCG on ANZAC day in 2007 in front of a crowd of 100,000.

== Background and release ==
Between December 2005 and January 2006, Cole travelled to Iraq and the Middle East to do a series of concerts for Australian Defence Force. Upon her return, she received a letter from a fan objecting to her Tour de Force appearances, mistakenly thinking her singing overseas to Aussie troops amounted to her supporting the war. Cole said the criticism stung, "To be accused of supporting some sort of ridiculous war on terror – which was not what I was doing at all – hurt." Cole explained; "I was incredibly inspired by the whole experience of going over to the Middle East to entertain the Aussie troops, but also getting to know them and understanding what they're all about. I was like a proud mother hen over there, so I really did want to come back and sing their praises. I wanted to write a song, but I didn't know what angle. That's when I received the criticism." Cole continued saying "You can support the troops without supporting the war. You can recognise that they do an amazing job, that they put their lives on the line and put themselves in danger because we need a Defence Force. Wonderful, wonderful people."

In October 2006, the song went viral after there was a short passage about the song in Defence Direct and was picked up by Melbourne blogger, Andrew Llanderyou, which was the source of Andrew Bolt's Herald Sun article which in turn was the source for American blogs like Blackfive and even the Toronto Sun.

== Charts ==
"Poster Girl (Wrong Side of the World)" reached number one spot on the Country Tracks Top 30 singles chart.
