= Saturday Night Country =

Australian country music radio program

- Genre: Country Music
- Running time: 9:05 pm–
- Country of origin: Australia
- Language: English
- Home station: ABC
- TV adaptations: Channel 24
- Hosted by: Melody Moko
- Produced by: Australian Broadcasting Corporation
- Recording studio: ABC Radio Adelaide
- Original release: 1993

Saturday Night Country is a weekly Australian country music radio program. It is produced by the Australian Broadcasting Corporation and broadcast from 9:05 pm (Australian Eastern Time) on Saturday nights. The current host is the country singer Melody Moko.

== History ==
Saturday Night Country was created by John Nutting, who hosted the program from its debut in 1993 until March 2010. Nutting broadcast from the ABC North Queensland studios in Townsville. He later explained that the program was conceived during a period when the ABC faced criticism for being too city‑centric. He proposed a national country music program from regional Queensland to counter perceptions of metropolitan bias. Although initially placed in what he described as a “dead spot” late on Saturday nights, the show quickly built a strong audience and expanded to four hours.

The program broadcasts on regional ABC Local Radio stations and on the digital station ABC Country. The program is also available nationally via ABC’s online streaming platforms and the show’s website. From 3 February 2024, the first hour of the program began airing on ABC Local Radio stations in state capital cities, returning the show to metropolitan AM and DAB+ schedules.

Until January 2017, the full program was broadcast on the ABC’s metropolitan AM stations in capital cities. In late 2016, the ABC announced that the metropolitan AM broadcast would be replaced with a Saturday night edition of Nightlife, ending the program’s long-running presence on those frequencies. Despite this change, the complete show remained accessible in metropolitan markets through ABC Country on DAB+ and online streaming.

== Hosts ==
=== Felicity Urquhart (2010–2020) ===
Felicity Urquhart became host in March 2010, succeeding Nutting. She remained in the role until December 2020. Between 2013 and 2015, Catherine Britt served as temporary host during Urquhart’s absence.

During this period, the program aired on regional ABC Local Radio and ABC Country. Until January 2017, it was also broadcast on metropolitan AM stations, before being replaced in those markets by a Saturday edition of Nightlife. The full program continued to be available via ABC Country on DAB+ and online streaming.

Urquhart hosted more than 500 episodes and over 2,000 hours of programming before signing off on 26 December 2020.

=== Beccy Cole (2021–2026) ===
In January 2021, the ABC announced that Beccy Cole would become the new host of Saturday Night Country. Her first program aired on 13 February 2021, featuring Adam Harvey as her inaugural guest. Cole broadcast from the ABC's Collinswood studios in Adelaide. Under her tenure, the program shifted to a three‑hour format beginning at 10:05 pm on Saturdays, later moving to 9:05 pm Australian South‑Eastern Time on 3 February 2024.

After the December 2021 – January 2022 summer hiatus, Amber Lawrence temporarily hosted the program until Cole returned on 30 April 2022.

=== Melody Moko (2026–present) ===
In February 2026, the ABC announced that singer‑songwriter Melody Moko would take over as host from 7 March 2026.
