= Feel This Free =

Studio album by Beccy Cole
- Released: April 11, 2005
- Recorded: 2004
- Studio: The Music Cellar
- Genre: Country
- Length: 49:35
- Label: ABC/Universal
- Producer: Rod McCormack

Beccy Cole chronology
Little Victories (2003)	Feel This Free (2005)	Live @ Lizotte's (2007)

Singles from Feel This Free
- 1. "Rainbows, Dreams And Butterflies" Released: March 2005; 2. "Poster Girl" Released: May 2006

Feel This Free is the fourth studio album by Australian musical artist, Beccy Cole. It was released in April 2005 and peaked at number 66 on the ARIA Charts.

Upon release, Cole told Susan Jarvis of Capital News "We really planned this album, and it's turned out exactly the way we wanted. I had a lot to say, so there aren't so many humorous songs. If you listen to one of the tracks on the album, "The Clown Song", you’ll understand why. But the overall vibe of the album is incredibly positive." adding "The other thing we were determined to do was make an album that I could perform live. Every song can be done on stage – the album can be read as a set list, if I want. That hasn't been possible with my last couple of recordings, so I’m really enjoying that aspect of it."

The album was re-released with three new tracks in May 2006.

== Background and release ==
In 2004, Cole began work on Feel This Free. In her 2015 autobiography, Cole said The album included songs that were 'healing' to write, including "The Clown Song", which she says is her most personal and revealing song she'd written. The song deals with her sexuality and although wasn't her coming out song, it was 'significant'.

The album photo shoot was completed in Melbourne by Pierre Baroni

== Singles ==
"Rainbows, Dreams and Butterflies" was released as the first single. Cole said; "Rainbows is a pretty honest look at my approach to life and love. While I admit to not exactly being an angel, I do try and live life to the fullest and give as much as I can of myself in the process." "Poster Girl (Wrong Side of the World)" was released in May 2006. The song went on to win three Golden Guitars at the 35th annual Country Music Awards of Australia in January 2007; including 'Song of the Year', and 'Single of the Year'.

== Track listing ==
Standard Edition

1. "Rainbows, Dreams and Butterflies" (Beccy Cole, Rod McCormack) – 3:58
2. "A Better Woman" (Connie Harrington, Tony Martin, Tom Shapiro) – 2:38
3. "Just Because She Always Has" (Amber Dotson, Jimmy Melton) – 4:25
4. "So Good for So Long" (Alan Anderson, Bekka Bramlett, Bob DiPiero) – 3:27
5. "To Feel This Free" (Jim McBride, McCormack, Jerry Salley) – 3:55
6. "You Can't Have That" (Anderson, Tom Hambridge) – 3:21
7. "The Clown Song" (Cole, McCormack) – 4:12
8. "Leave Love Out of This" (Robert Ellis Orrall) – 2:50
9. "His Hometown" (Cheryl Wheeler) – 4:03
10. "Jesse" (Cole, McCormack, Gina Jeffreys) – 5:33
11. "Some Lessons" (Cole, McCormack) – 3:19
12. "Someone Else's Shoes" (Cole, McCormack, Salley) – 3:35
13. "Girls Out Here" (Cole, McCormack, Jeffreys) – 4:19

Bonus Edition

14. "Poster Girl (Wrong Side of the World)" (Cole) – 4:01
15. "Lazy Bones" – 9:18
16. "Nine to Five" (Dolly Parton) (live) – 3:03

== Personnel ==
- Beccy Cole - vocals

Musicians

- Rod McCormack - acoustic guitar, banjo, papoose, mandolin, gut string, backing vocals
- Mick Albeck - fiddle
- Clayton Doley - Hammond organ
- Mitch Farmer - drums
- Stu French - electric guitar
- James Gillard - bass, upright bass, backing vocals
- Jeff McCormack - bass
- Rex Goh - electric guitar
- Brendan Radford - acoustic guitar
- Bill Risby - piano
- Michel Rose - steel guitar, dobro
- Lochie Davidson - mandolin
- Camile Te Nahu - backing vocals
- Karen O'Shea - backing vocals, The Girls Out Here Party Girls' vocals
- Lyn Bowtell - backing vocals
- Kate Ballantyne - backing vocals The Girls Out Here Party Girls' vocals (appear courtesy of Ocean Road and Sony/BMG)
- The Girls Out Here Party Girls (Gina Jeffreys (appear courtesy of Ocean Road), Suzy Thompson, Robyn Waugh, Louise Ashman, Gemma Luxton, Peta Copps, Samantha Warton, Rachel Ashliegh & Vicki Wilson, Toni Hutchison, Sue-Ann O'Reilly, Sandie Parry, Becky Willis, Dianne Sinclair, Kim Juresa, Nola Hillenburg) - backing vocals

== Charts ==
Chart (2005)	Peak position
Australian Albums (ARIA)	66
Australian Country Albums (ARIA)	3

== Release history ==
Region	Date	Edition	Format	Label	Catalogue
Australia	11 April 2005	Standard	CD; digital download	ABC Music	1777806
Australia	27 May 2006	Bonus Edition	CD; digital download	ABC Music	
