= Felicity Urquhart =

Australian country music singer

- Also known as: Felicity
- Born: Felicity Ann Urquhart; 4 May 1976 (age 50)
- Origin: Tamworth, New South Wales, Australia
- Genres: Country, Western
- Occupations: singer-songwriter, radio and television presenter
- Instrument: guitar
- Years active: 1987–present
- Labels: Hadley, Radio Friendly, EMI, Shock
- Member of: Bennett Bowtell Urquhart
- Spouse: Glen Hannah (m. 2009; died 2019)
- Website: felicityurquhart.com

Felicity Ann Urquhart (born 4 May 1976) is an Australian country music singer-songwriter, and a TV and radio presenter. Her single "Big Black Cloud", co-written with Randy Scruggs, reached No. 1 on Country Tracks National Top 30 Singles Chart in 2007. She has won numerous awards including a Centenary Medal in 2001 "For service to Australian society through country music". Urquhart married musician and producer Glen Hannah in March 2009. She has been the host of country music show Saturday Night Country on Australian Broadcasting Corporation Local Radio since March 2010.

Since 2015, Urquhart has been part of the group Bennett Bowtell Urquhart.

== Early life ==
Felicity Ann Urquhart was born on 4 May 1976 to Rex, an upholsterer, and Patricia "Trish" Urquhart. She grew up in Tamworth in rural New South Wales. Rex was a singer and whistler and encouraged Urquhart to take singing seriously. Her uncle, Ian Plant, was also a musician, a guitar player who also inspired her.

Her maternal grandfather, Ernie Walmsley, was a jockey turned horse-trainer and with her grandmother, Anne, ran a pub in Bingara. Urquhart began busking in Peel Street, Tamworth during the Tamworth Country Music Festival at the age of 11. Aside from learning guitar, Urquhart had piano lessons and performed in musicals.

== Career ==
In 1992 Urquhart released her debut self-titled album, Felicity Urquhart on Tamworth-based Hadley Records. Her second album, Follow Me appeared in 1995 on Radio Friendly Music. Nothing to Hide was released in 1999 on EMI with New Shadow issued in 2001. On 1 January she was awarded a Centenary Medal by Prime Minister, John Howard.

Urquhart performed with western swing group Feral Swing Katz at the Gympie National Country Music Muster in August – the performance was broadcast a year later on Live on Stage by ABC Radio National with Vince Jones presenting. In 2002, she travelled to Nashville to record tracks for a future album with Hannah providing acoustic guitar, harmony vocals and song writing. Album plans fell through and Urquhart left EMI. She recorded a six-track extended play, Turn out the Light on Shock Records which was released in 2004.

Shock Records distributed My Life in 2006, which was produced by Hannah (ex-Kasey Chambers touring band). Her single "Big Black Cloud", co-written with Randy Scruggs, appeared in November and reached No.1 on Country Tracks National Top 30 Singles Chart on 24 January 2007. On 5 September, Urquhart performed for John Howard, United States President George W Bush and Australian Defence Force personnel at a barbecue on Garden Island.

Urquhart released Landing Lights upon return to Australia. Internationally she has opened for country music legends Willie Nelson and Waylon Jennings. From 2005 to 2009, Urquhart was a presenter on Sydney Weekender, a travel show on Seven Network. She has been the host of country music show Saturday Night Country on Australian Broadcasting Corporation Local Radio across Australia since March 2010. She had previously filled-in for retiring host John Nutting who had picked her as his replacement.

In 2015, Urquhart formed the group Bennett Bowtell Urquhart with Kevin Bennett and Lyn Bowtell. In 2019, ten years since her last solo album, Urquhart released Frozen Rabbit. In January 2020, Urquhart and Josh Cunningham were invited to join Song Club—a creative collective that tasked members with writing a song a week. Nine of these weekly tracks were recorded and released in May 2021 on the album, The Song Club.

Urquhart was nominated for six awards at the 2024 Country Music Awards of Australia.

== Personal life ==
In 2001 she met Glen Hannah (died 2019) who became her boyfriend. Urquhart and Hannah married on 10 March 2009 in Vanuatu.

She lives in Avoca Beach on the New South Wales Central Coast.

== Discography ==
=== Studio albums ===
List of studio albums, with release date, label, formats and chart positions shown
Title	Details	Peak chart positions
Title	Details	AUS
Felicity Urquhart	Released: 1992; Label: Hadley (HCDM1308); Format: CD	—
Follow Me	Released: 1995; Label: Radio Friendly Music (RFMCD003); CD	—
Nothing to Hide	Released:1999; Label: EMI Music (724349951020); Format: CD	—
New Shadow	Released: 2001; Label: EMI Music (724353501525); Format: CD	—
My Life	Released: 2005; Label:Felicity Urquhart, Shock (FU004); Format: CD	—
Landing Lights	Released:2009; Label: Felicity Urquhart, Shock (FU007); Format: CD, digital	—
Frozen Rabbit	Released:26 April 2019; Label: ABC Music/Universal Music; Format: CD, digital	—
The Song Club (with Josh Cunningham)	Released:7 May 2021; Label: ABC Music/Universal Music (3595271); Format: CD, digital	77
Birdsong (with Josh Cunningham)	Released: 29 September 2023; Label: ABC Music/Universal Music; Format: CD, digital	—
Everything Around You (with Josh Cunningham)	Released: 6 March 2026; Label: ABC Music; Format: CD, digital	85

== Awards and nominations ==
=== AIR Awards ===
The Australian Independent Record Awards (commonly known informally as AIR Awards) is an annual awards night to recognise, promote and celebrate the success of Australia's Independent Music sector.

Year	Nominee / work	Award	Result
2008	My Life	Best Independent Country Release	Nominated
2020	Frozen Rabbit	Best Independent Country Album	Nominated
2022	The Song Club (with Josh Cunningham)	Best Independent Country Album or EP	Won

=== ARIA Music Awards ===
Year	Nominee / work	Award	Result
2009	Landing Lights	Best Country Album	Nominated
2019	Frozen Rabbit	Best Country Album	Nominated
2021	The Song Club (with Josh Cunningham)	Best Country Album	Nominated

=== Australian Club Entertainment Awards ===
Year	Nominee / work	Award	Result
1998	Felicity Urquhart	Country Female Performer	Won
1999	Felicity Urquhart	Country Female Performer	Won
2000	Felicity Urquhart	Country Female Performer	Won
2001	Felicity Urquhart	Country Female Performer	Nominated
2002	Felicity Urquhart	Country Female Performer	Nominated
2003	Felicity Urquhart	Country Female Performer	Nominated
2005	Felicity Urquhart	Country Female Performer	Nominated
2006	Felicity Urquhart	Country Female Performer	Nominated
2007	Felicity Urquhart	Country Female Performer	Nominated
2008	Felicity Urquhart	Country Female Performer	Nominated
2009	Felicity Urquhart	Country Female Performer	Nominated

=== Australian Independent Country Music Awards ===
Year	Nominee / work	Award	Result
2004	Turn out the Light	Australian Independent Female Vocalist of the Year	Won
2006	My Life	Australian Independent Album of the Year	Won
2006	"The Flood"	Australian Independent Female Vocalist of the Year	Won

=== Australian Songwriters' Association ===
Year	Nominee / work	Award	Result
2005	Felicity Urquhart & Glen Hannah – "The Flood"	Country Songwriter of the Year	Won

=== Country Music Awards (CMAA) ===
The Country Music Awards of Australia (CMAA) (also known as the Golden Guitar Awards) is an annual awards night held in January during the Tamworth Country Music Festival, celebrating recording excellence in the Australian country music industry. They have been held annually since 1973.

Year	Nominee / work	Award	Result(wins only)
2001	Felicity Urquhart	The Australian Country Music Hands of Fame	Imprinted
2001	Felicity Urquhart (with Beccy Cole, Darren Coggan & Adam Harvey) – "Do I Ever Cross Your Mind"	Vocal Collaboration of the Year	Won
2006	Felicity Urquhart	Independent Entertainer of the Year	Won
2007	"Big Black Cloud"	Video Clip of the Year	Won
2007	Felicity Urquhart	Independent Entertainer of the Year	Won
2010	"Roller Coaster"	Female Vocalist of the Year	Won
2020	Frozen Rabbit	Traditional Country Album of the Year	Won
2020	Frozen Rabbit	Female Artist of the Year	Won
2020	Frozen Rabbit	Album of the Year	Won
2020	"Chain of Joy"	Song of the Year	Won
2020	"Chain of Joy"	Single of the Year	Won
2024	Birdsong (with Josh Cunningham)	Traditional Country Album of the Year	Won
2024	"Size Up" (with Josh Cunningham)	Song of the Year	Won
2024	"Size Up" (with Josh Cunningham)	Single of the Year	Won

=== Mo Award ===
The Australian Entertainment Mo Awards (commonly known informally as the Mo Awards), were annual Australian entertainment industry awards. They recognise achievements in live entertainment in Australia from 1975 to 2016. Urquhart won two awards in that time.

Year	Nominee / work	Award	Result
1995	Felicity Urquhart	Female Country Performer of the Year	Won
1997	Felicity Urquhart	Female Country Performer of the Year	Won
