= Greatest Hits (Troy Cassar-Daley album) =

Greatest hits album by Troy Cassar-Daley
- Released: 19 October 2018
- Recorded: 1994–2018
- Genre: Country
- Label: Bloodlines, Liberation Music
- Producer: Troy Cassar-Daley

Troy Cassar-Daley chronology
| Lost & Found (2018) | Greatest Hits (2018) | Christmas for Cowboys (2020) |

Greatest Hits is a compilation album by Australian country music artist Troy Cassar-Daley. The album is due for release on 19 October 2018.

The 42-track album includes tracks from all of Cassar-Daley's studio albums and includes two brand new singles including the opening track "Wouldn't Change a Thing" and "Shadows On the Hill" from the ABC television series Mystery Road. A national tour to support the album is set to commence in January 2019.

In a statement Cassar-Daley said: "Looking back over this collection of songs across my whole career I can reflect on the great times such as celebrating my first Golden Guitar or ARIA Award and in contrast the periods where I have doubted myself and my music, felt alone. But at the end of the day, I say to myself 'I wouldn't change a thing'."

== Reception ==
Jeff Jenkins from Stack Magazine described the album as "Heartfelt and honest" and called Cassar-Daley "one of the great Australian country writers."

== Track listing ==
CD1
| No. | Title | Writer(s) | Album | Length |
|---|---|---|---|---|
| 1. | "Wouldn't Change a Thing" | | new recording | 3:35 |
| 2. | "Proud Young Man" | | non-album single | 3:09 |
| 3. | "Dream Out Loud" | | Beyond the Dancing | 3:17 |
| 4. | "End of the Road" | | Beyond the Dancing | 4:09 |
| 5. | "Ramblin' Man" (featuring Tommy Emmanuel) | Dickey Betts | non-album single | 3:49 |
| 6. | "Little Things" | | True Believer | 3:33 |
| 7. | "Bar Room Roses" | | True Believer | 3:40 |
| 8. | "Ladies in My Life" | | True Believer | 3:45 |
| 9. | "The Biggest Disappointment" (featuring Slim Dusty) | Joy McKean | True Believer Tamworth Festival edition | 3:12 |
| 10. | "True Believer" | | True Believer | 2:54 |
| 11. | "They Don't Make 'Em Like That Anymore" | | Big River | 3:58 |
| 12. | "Trains" | | Big River | 3:51 |
| 13. | "I Wanna Go Back" | | Big River | 3:49 |
| 14. | "V8 Town" | | Big River | 3:21 |
| 15. | "40 Miles" | | Long Way Home | 4:37 |
| 16. | "Born to Survive" | | Long Way Home | 4:27 |
| 17. | "Long Way Home" | | Long Way Home | 3:17 |
| 18. | "Wish I Was a Train" (featuring Paul Kelly) | | Long Way Home | 3:17 |
| 19. | "Long Way Home" | | Long Way Home | 3:17 |
| 20. | "Yer So Bad" | Jeff Lynne; Tom Petty | Borrowed & Blue | 3:07 |
| 21. | "River Boy" (featuring Shane Howard) | Fred Carter Jr. | Borrowed & Blue | 2:52 |

CD2
| No. | Title | Writer(s) | Album | Length |
|---|---|---|---|---|
| 1. | "Lonesome But Free" | | Brighter Day | 4:11 |
| 2. | "Going Back Home" | | Brighter Day | 3:23 |
| 3. | "Get Away Car" (featuring Kasey Chambers) | | Brighter Day | 5:05 |
| 4. | "Walking Away" | | Brighter Day | 4:10 |
| 5. | "Everything's Going to Be Alright" (featuring My Friends Choir) | Cassar-Daley; Don Walker | Born to Survive | 3:48 |
| 6. | "Last Mile Home" | | Born to Survive | 3:21 |
| 7. | "Bird on a Wire" (featuring Jimmy Barnes and Bella) | Leonard Cohen | Brighter Day bonus disc/Born to Survive | 4:26 |
| 8. | "Big Big Love" | Cassar-Daley | I Love This Place | 3:12 |
| 9. | "Sing About This Country" | Cassar-Daley; Colin Buchanan | I Love This Place | 3:41 |
| 10. | "I Love This Place" | Cassar-Daley | I Love This Place | 3:31 |
| 11. | "Chasin' Rodeo" | Cassar-Daley | I Love This Place | 3:14 |
| 12. | "Country Is" | | Home | 3:46 |
| 13. | "Live and Learn" | | Home | 3:19 |
| 14. | "Home" | | Home | 4:05 |
| 15. | "Lights on the Hill" (featuring Adam Harvey) | | The Great Country Songbook | 3:12 |
| 16. | "Take a Walk in My Country" | Cassar-Daley; Buchanan | Freedom Ride | 3:49 |
| 17. | "Freedom Ride" | Cassar-Daley; Kelly | Freedom Ride | 3:36 |
| 18. | "Another Australian Day" | Cassar-Daley; Peter Denahy | Freedom Ride | 4:17 |
| 19. | "Things I Carry Around" | Cassar-Daley; Don Sampson; Wynn Varble | Things I Carry Around | 3:24 |
| 20. | "Halfway Creek, Timber Cutting Man" | Cassar-Daley | Things I Carry Around | 3:58 |
| 21. | "Shadows on the Hill" | | new recording | 4:01 |

== Charts ==
=== Weekly charts ===
| Chart (2018) | Peak position |
|---|---|
| Australian Albums (ARIA) | 7 |

=== Year-end charts ===
| Chart (2018) | Peak position |
|---|---|
| Australian Country Albums (ARIA) | 43 |
| Chart (2019) | Position |
| Australian Country Albums (ARIA) | 39 |

== Release history ==
| Country | Date | Format | Label | Catalogue |
|---|---|---|---|---|
| Australia | 19 October 2018 | CD, LP, digital download, streaming | Bloodlines/Liberation Records | BLOOD33 |
| Australia | 30 November 2018 | LP | Bloodlines/Liberation Records | BLOODLP33 |
