= Tea for Three (disambiguation) =

Tea for Three is a 1927 American comedy silent film directed by Robert Z. Leonard.

Tea for Three may also refer to:

== Books ==
- Tea for Three, a 1994 book by Max Fatchen and Colin Thiele
- Tea for Three, the first part of the 2009 fourth chapter of the manga The World God Only Knows

== Film and television ==
=== Films ===
- Tea for Three (2024 film), a 2024 Japanese film directed by Kentarō Ōtani
- Tea for Three (1976 film) (Duett zu dritt in German), a 1976 Austrian film starring Eric Pohlmann, Iris Berben, Erni Mangold and Mascha Gonska

=== TV series ===
- Tea for Three, a 2020 TV series starring Rita May

=== TV episodes ===
- "Tea for Three", a 2013 Doctors episode, season 14, episode 219
- "Tea for Three", a 2020 Fancy Nancy episode, season 2, episode 13
- "Tea for Three", a 1999 Mike, Lu & Og episode, season 1, episode 1b
- "Tea for Three", a 1986 Only Fools and Horses episode, season 5, episode 4
- "Tea for Three", a 2007 Wow! Wow! Wubbzy! episode, season 1, episode 17b

== Music ==
=== Albums ===
- Tea for Three (Negicco album), by Negicco, 2016
- Tea for Three, by Ari Hoenig, 2024
- Tea for Three, by Royce Campbell and Hod O'Brien, 2017
- Tea for Three, by Saunders, Kane and Del, with Jane Saunders and Shanley Del, 1995
- Tea for Three or its title track, by Stephen Trombley, 2014
- Tea for Three or its title track, by The Willows, 2017

=== Songs ===
- "Tea for Three", by Beccy Cole from Sweet Rebecca, 2015
- "Té para 3" (Tea for Three in Spanish), by Soda Stereo from Canción Animal, 1990

== Plays ==
- Tea for Three, directed by Roi Cooper Megrue, 1918
- Tea for Three, directed by William Postance, 1936

== Other works ==
- Tea for Three (group) a Japanese music group formed by members of The Tigers
- Té para tres (Tea for Three in Spanish), a radio program directed and presented by Eva Sandoval
- Tea for Three, a 1981 dance work by Viola Farber and Sarah Stackhouse

== See also ==
- "Tea for One", a song by Led Zeppelin from the 1976 album Presence
- Tea for Two (disambiguation)
