= Who You Are =

Who You Are may refer to:

- Who You Are (Cary Brothers album), 2007
- Who You Are (Desperation Band album), 2006
- Who You Are (Jessie J album), 2011
  - "Who You Are" (Jessie J song)
- "Who You Are" (Pearl Jam song), 1996
- Who You Are (Rachael Fahim album), 2026
  - "Who You Are" (Rachael Fahim song)
- "Who You Are", a song by Craig David from 22, 2022
- "Who You Are", a song by Damien Leith, B-side to the single "22 Steps", 2007
- "Who You Are", a song by Oomph! from Ego, 2001
- "Who You Are", a song and album by Rachael Fahim, 2026
- "Who You Are", a song by Tally Hall from Good & Evil, 2011
- "Who You Are", a song by Unspoken from Get to Me EP, 2012

== See also ==
- Who Are You (disambiguation)
