= The World Today =

The World Today may refer to:

In print media:

- The World Today (magazine), an international current-affairs magazine published by Chatham House
- The World To-Day, a monthly magazine published from 1902-1912, a predecessor of Cosmopolitan
- World Today, the English-language translation of Bota Sot, a Kosovo newspaper

In radio:

- The World Today (Australian radio program), a radio news program by the Australian Broadcasting Corporation
- The World Today (radio programme), a radio news programme on the BBC World Service
- The World Today, a former news roundup program broadcast on the Mutual Broadcasting System
- The World Today, a former name of the weekend edition of CBS World News Roundup, a radio news broadcast on the CBS Radio Network

In television:

- The World Today (Philippine news series) (1972–1974), a former television news program on the GMA Network
- The World Today (BBC News programme), a news programme on BBC News channel

In music:

- The World Today (album), a 2021 studio album by Troy Cassar-Daley
