= Deadly Awards 2012 =

Australian Aboriginal and Torres Strait Islander annual music awards

The 2012 Deadly Awards were hosted by Luke Carroll and Casey Donovan at the Sydney Opera House on 25 September 2012. Jessica Mauboy and opera singer Deborah Cheetham performed at the ceremony. The Awards program were broadcast on nationally on SBS One on 30 September 2012. The event was an annual celebration of Australian Aboriginal and Torres Strait Islander achievement in music, sport, entertainment and community.

== Lifetime Achievement ==
- Ella Award for Lifetime Achievement in Aboriginal and Torres Strait Islander Sport: Arthur Beetson (NRL)
- Jimmy Little Award for Lifetime Achievement in Aboriginal and Torres Strait Music: The Sapphires – Beverly Briggs, Naomi Mayers, Lois Peeler, Laurel Robinson and Tony Briggs
- The Marcia Langton Award For Lifetime Achievement In Leadership: Percy Neal
- The Lifetime Contribution Award For Healing The Stolen Generations: Aunty Lorraine Darcy Peeters

== Music ==
- Single Release of the Year: Jessica Mauboy – "Galaxy"
- Album Release of the Year: Troy Cassar-Daley – Home
- Male Artist of the Year: Gurrumul Yunupingu
- Female Artist of the Year: Jessica Mauboy
- Band of the Year: The Last Kinection
- Most Promising New Talent in Music: Marcus Corowa
- Hip Hop Artist of the Year: Yung Warriors
- APRA Song of the Year: "Biding My Time", Busby Marou, Writers: Thomas Busby / Jeremy Marou, Publisher: Sony/ATV Music Publishing Australia Pty Ltd

== Sport ==
- Sportsman of the Year: Patrick Mills, basketball
- Sportswoman of the Year: Bo de la Cruz
- Outstanding Achievement in AFL: Lewis Jetta
- Outstanding Achievement in NRL: Ben Barba
- Most Promising New Talent in Sport: Damien Duncan Hooper (boxing)

== The arts ==
- Film of the Year: Mabo
- TV Show of the Year: The Straits
- Male Actor of the Year: Jimi Bani, playing Eddie Mabo in Mabo
- Female Actor of the Year: Deborah Mailman, playing Bonita Mabo in Mabo
- Outstanding Achievement in Literature: Ali Cobby Eckermann for Ruby Moonlight
- Dancer of the Year: Janet Munyarryun
- Visual Artist of the Year: Vernon Ah Kee

== Community ==
- Outstanding Achievement in Aboriginal and Torres Strait Islander Health: Boodjari Yorgas Family Care Program
- Aboriginal and Torres Strait Islander Health Worker of the Year – John Corowa
- Outstanding Achievement in Aboriginal and Torres Strait Islander Employment: Gavin Lester – Boomerang Constructions
- Broadcaster of the Year: Natalie Ahmat – NITV News
- Outstanding Achievement in Aboriginal and Torres Strait Islander Education: Napranum Parents and Learning Group (PAL)
- Outstanding Contribution To The Stolen Generations: AbSec – NSW
- Outstanding Achievement In Cultural Advancement: Tjanpi Desert Weavers – NPY Women's Council

== The Sydney Opera House Award ==
- Thelma Plum
