= Both Sides Now (Adam Harvey album) =

Studio album by Adam Harvey
- Released: 9 October 2009
- Recorded: Sony Music Studios, Sydney
- Genre: Country
- Length: 39:36
- Label: Liberation Music
- Producer: Rod McCormack

Adam Harvey chronology
I'm Doin' Alright (2007)	Both Sides Now (2009)	Best So Far (2010)

Both Sides Now is the eighth studio album by Australian country music artist Adam Harvey. The album was released in October 2009 and peaked at number 19 on the ARIA Charts.

At the ARIA Music Awards of 2010, the album was nominated for the ARIA Award for Best Country Album.

== Track listing ==
No.	Title	Writer(s)	Length
1.	"Stuck in the Middle" (with Guy Sebastian)	Gerry Rafferty; Joe Egan	3:06
2.	"Easy" (with Wendy Matthews)	Lionel Richie	4:07
3.	"Move It On Over" (with David Campbell)	Hank Williams	2:52
4.	"Both Sides Now" (with The McClymonts)	Joni Mitchell	3:56
5.	"Down on the Corner" (with Leo Sayer)	John Fogerty	2:59
6.	"King of the Road" (with John Williamson)	Roger Miller	2:06
7.	"It's All Over Now" (featuring Shannon Noll)	Bobby Womack; Shirley Womack	3:05
8.	"Seven Spanish Angels" (featuring Troy Cassar-Daley)	Troy Seals; Eddie Setser	3:17
9.	"In the Jailhouse Now" (featuring Kasey Chambers and Shane Nicholson)	Jimmie Rodgers	2:37
10.	"Have I Told You Lately" (featuring Renée Geyer)	Van Morrison	4:06
11.	"Jackson" (featuring Beccy Cole)	Billy Edd Wheeler; Jerry Leiber	2:38
12.	"Mr. Bojangles" (featuring Tommy Emmanuel)	Jerry Jeff Walker	4:58

Limited Edition DVD
No.	Title	Length
1.	"Both Sides Now in the Studio documentary"
2.	"King of the Road" (featuring John Williamson)
3.	"Stuck in the Middle" (featuring Guy Sebastian)
4.	"Easy" (featuring Wendy Matthews)

== Charts ==
=== Weekly charts ===
Chart (2009)	Peak position
Australian Albums (ARIA)	19

=== Year-end charts ===
Chart (2009)	Position
ARIA Country Albums Chart	11
Chart (2010)	Position
ARIA Country Albums Chart	17

== Certifications ==
Region	Certification	Certified units/sales
Australia (ARIA)	Gold	35,000^{^}
^{^} Shipments figures based on certification alone.

== Release history ==
Country	Date	Format	Label	Catalogue
Australia	9 October 2009	CD, digital download	Sony Music Records	88697583672
Australia	2 February 2010	Limited Edition CD/DVD	Sony Music Records	88697632722
