= Christmas for Cowboys =

Studio album by Troy Cassar-Daley
- Released: 6 November 2020
- Genre: Country, Christmas
- Length: 32:51
- Label: Sony Music Australia

Troy Cassar-Daley chronology
Greatest Hits (2018)	Christmas for Cowboys (2020)	The World Today (2021)

Christmas for Cowboys is the twelfth studio album and first Christmas album by Australian country music artist Troy Cassar-Daley. The album was released 6 November 2020 and peaked at number 13 on the ARIA Charts.

The album featured seven Christmas standard and three originals, including "Christmas for a Broken Family", which features his 18-year-old daughter, Jem.

Upon release, Cassar-Daley said "Christmas is a very special time of year for our family and music has always played a big part in Christmas family gatherings with all sides of our family tree. Getting a chance to share songs I've loved to sing for years, from backyards in Grafton and Brisbane to Christmas Carol events all over Australia, means a lot to me… and this collection gives you a good idea of the songs I've covered, whether sitting around with guitars or playing them with an orchestra."

== Reception ==
Jeff Jenkins from Stack Magazine said "Like an Aussie version of Randy Travis, Cassar-Daley has a classic country crooner's voice – perfect for this material."

== Track listing ==
No.	Title	Writer(s)	Length
1.	"Blue Christmas"	Billy Hayes, Jay W. Johnson	2:56
2.	"Christmas for Cowboys"	Steve Weisberg	2:52
3.	"We Want to Share Christmas with You"	Troy Cassar-Daley	3:04
4.	"I Still Can't Say Goodbye"	Cassar-Daley	3:16
5.	"Let's Make a Baby King"	Jesse Winchester	3:45
6.	"Have Yourself a Merry Little Christmas"	Hugh Martin, Ralph Blane	3:44
7.	"Please Come Home for Christmas"	Charles Brown, Gene Redd	3:09
8.	"Let It Snow"	Sammy Cahn, Julius Stein	2:37
9.	"Silent Night"	Franz Xaver Gruber, Joseph Mohr	2:59
10.	"Christmas for a Broken Family" (with Jem Cassar-Daley)	Jem Cassar-Daley, Troy Cassar-Daley	4:38
Total length:			32:51

== Charts ==
Chart (2020)	Peak position
Australian Albums (ARIA)	13

== Release history ==
Country	Date	Format	Label	Catalogue
Australia	6 November 2020	CD, digital download, streaming	Sony Music Australia	19439807412
