= ARIA Award for Best Country Album =

Annual Australian music industry award

- Country: Australia
- Presented by: Australian Recording Industry Association (ARIA)
- First award: 1987
- Currently held by: Rachael Fahim, Who You Are (2026)

Highlights
- Most wins: Kasey Chambers (10)
- Most nominations: Troy Cassar-Daley (14)
- Website: ariaawards.com.au

The ARIA Music Award for Best Country Album, is an award presented at the annual ARIA Music Awards, which recognises "the many achievements of Aussie artists across all music genres", since 1987. It is handed out by the Australian Recording Industry Association (ARIA), an organisation whose aim is "to advance the interests of the Australian record industry."

Kasey Chambers holds the record for the most wins in this category, having won all ten of her nominations as a solo artist in addition to winning as a member of the Dead Ringer Band in 1996. Troy Cassar-Daley has the most nominations with 14 (15 counting the various artists album Not So Dusty), while Adam Brand and Catherine Britt are tied for the most nominations without a win with seven each. Three artists have won in two consecutive years; John Williamson in 1989 and 1990, Lee Kernaghan in 1993 and 1994, and Chambers in 2013 (for Wreck & Ruin, a collaboration with Shane Nicholson) and 2014 and again in 2017 and 2018.

== Winners and nominees ==
In the following table, the winner is highlighted in a separate colour, and in boldface; the nominees are those that are not highlighted or in boldface. Full nominees for 1988 are not available in published sources.

Winner marked in a separate colour

Year	Winner(s)	Album Title
**1987** (1st)
**1987** (1st)	**John Williamson**	**Mallee Boy**
**1987** (1st)	Jean Stafford	Burning Bright
**1987** (1st)	Johnny Chester	There's a Shadow on the Moon Tonight
**1987** (1st)	Slim Dusty	Stories I Wanted to Tell
**1987** (1st)	The Three Chord Wonders	Try Change
**1988** (2nd)	**Flying Emus**	**This Town**
**1989** (3rd)
**1989** (3rd)	**John Williamson**	**Boomerang Café**
**1989** (3rd)	Flying Emus	"I Just Want to Dance With You"
**1989** (3rd)	Slim Dusty	G'day, G'day!
**1989** (3rd)	Smoky Dawson & Trevor Knight	High Country
**1989** (3rd)	Jenine Vaughan	"Gypsy Man"
**1990** (4th)
**1990** (4th)	**John Williamson**	**Warragul**
**1990** (4th)	Slim Dusty & Anne Kirkpatrick	Two Singers, One Song
**1990** (4th)	Ted Egan	This Land Australia
**1990** (4th)	The Flying Emus	Postcards From Paradise
**1990** (4th)	The Happening Thang	The Happening Thang
**1991** (5th)
**1991** (5th)	**James Blundell**	**Hand It Down**
**1991** (5th)	Luhrs & Crawford	Midnight In Paradise
**1991** (5th)	Norma Murphy	Closer Now
**1991** (5th)	Slim Dusty	Coming Home
**1991** (5th)	Various Artists	Breaking Ground - New Directions in Country Music
**1992** (6th)
**1992** (6th)	**Anne Kirkpatrick**	**Out of the Blue**
**1992** (6th)	James Blundell	"Time on His Hands"
**1992** (6th)	Graeme Connors	Tropicali
**1992** (6th)	Keith Urban	"Only You"
**1992** (6th)	John Williamson	Waratah St
**1993** (7th)
**1993** (7th)	**Lee Kernaghan**	**The Outback Club**
**1993** (7th)	James Blundell	This Road
**1993** (7th)	Colin Buchanan	Hard Times
**1993** (7th)	Keith Urban and Slim Dusty	"Lights on the Hill"
**1993** (7th)	Brent Parlane	Brent Parlane
**1994** (8th)
**1994** (8th)	**Lee Kernaghan**	**Three Chain Road**
**1994** (8th)	Graeme Connors	The Return
**1994** (8th)	Slim Dusty	Ringer from the Top End
**1994** (8th)	Anne Kirkpatrick	Game of Love
**1994** (8th)	John Williamson	Love Is a Good Woman
**1995** (9th)
**1995** (9th)	**Troy Cassar-Daley**	**Beyond the Dancing**
**1995** (9th)	Slim Dusty	Natural High
**1995** (9th)	Gina Jeffreys	The Flame
**1995** (9th)	Lee Kernaghan	Country Crowd
**1995** (9th)	Jane Saunders	Strangers to Your Heart
**1996** (10th)
**1996** (10th)	**The Dead Ringer Band**	**Home Fires**
**1996** (10th)	Graeme Connors	The Here and Now
**1996** (10th)	Lee Kernaghan	1959
**1996** (10th)	Tania Kernaghan	December Moon
**1996** (10th)	The Wheel	The Wheel
**1997** (11th)
**1997** (11th)	**Graeme Connors**	**The Road Less Travelled**
**1997** (11th)	The Dead Ringer Band	Living in the Circle
**1997** (11th)	The Ranch	The Ranch
**1997** (11th)	Tina Martyn	Lying in My Bed
**1997** (11th)	Troy Cassar-Daley	"True Believers"
**1998** (12th)
**1998** (12th)	**Shanley Del**	**My Own Sweet Time**
**1998** (12th)	Colin Buchanan	Edge of the Kimberley
**1998** (12th)	Troy Cassar-Daley	True Believer
**1998** (12th)	Gina Jeffreys	Someboy's Daughter
**1998** (12th)	The Wheel	Good Noise
**1999** (13th)
**1999** (13th)	**Kasey Chambers**	**The Captain**
**1999** (13th)	Adam Brand	Adam Brand
**1999** (13th)	Tania Kernaghan	Dancing on Water
**1999** (13th)	Kedron Taylor	Every Place I Go
**1999** (13th)	Various	Not So Dusty
**2000** (14th)
**2000** (14th)	**Troy Cassar-Daley**	**Big River**
**2000** (14th)	Adam Brand	Good Friends
**2000** (14th)	Lee Kernaghan	Rules of the Road
**2000** (14th)	Keith Urban	Keith Urban
**2000** (14th)	John Williamson	The Way It Is
**2001** (15th)
**2001** (15th)	**Slim Dusty**	**Looking Forward Looking Back**
**2001** (15th)	Audrey Auld	The Fallen
**2001** (15th)	Beccy Cole	Wild at Heart
**2001** (15th)	Gina Jeffreys	Angel
**2001** (15th)	Sara Storer	Chasing Buffalo
**2002** (16th)
**2002** (16th)	**Kasey Chambers**	**Barricades & Brickwalls**
**2002** (16th)	Adam Harvey	Workin' Overtime
**2002** (16th)	Catherine Britt	Dusty Smiles and Heartbreak Cures
**2002** (16th)	Lee Kernaghan	Electric Rodeo
**2002** (16th)	Troy Cassar-Daley	Long Way Home
**2003** (17th)
**2003** (17th)	**Keith Urban**	**Golden Road**
**2003** (17th)	Adam Harvey	Cowboy Dreams
**2003** (17th)	Beccy Cole	Little Victories
**2003** (17th)	Bill Chambers	Sleeping with the Blues
**2003** (17th)	Sara Storer	Beautiful Circle
**2004** (18th)
**2004** (18th)	**Kasey Chambers**	**Wayward Angel**
**2004** (18th)	Adam Brand	Get Loud
**2004** (18th)	Melinda Schneider	Family Tree
**2004** (18th)	Troy Cassar-Daley	Borrowed & Blue
**2004** (18th)	Slim Dusty	Columbia Lane - the Last Sessions
**2005** (19th)
**2005** (19th)	**Keith Urban**	**Be Here**
**2005** (19th)	Adam Harvey	Can't Settle For Less
**2005** (19th)	Audrey Auld Mezera	Texas
**2005** (19th)	Paul Kelly & the Stormwater Boys	Foggy Highway
**2005** (19th)	Sara Storer	Firefly
**2006** (20th)
**2006** (20th)	**Troy Cassar-Daley**	**Brighter Day**
**2006** (20th)	Adam Brand	What a Life
**2006** (20th)	Anne Kirkpatrick	Showman's Daughter
**2006** (20th)	Catherine Britt	Too Far Gone
**2006** (20th)	Lee Kernaghan	The New Bush
**2007** (21st)
**2007** (21st)	**Keith Urban**	**Love, Pain & the whole crazy thing**
**2007** (21st)	Gina Jeffreys	Walks of Life
**2007** (21st)	James Blundell	Ring Around the Moon
**2007** (21st)	Lou Bradley	Love Someone
**2007** (21st)	The Greencards	Veridian
**2008** (22nd)
**2008** (22nd)	**Kasey Chambers** and **Shane Nicholson**	**Rattlin' Bones**
**2008** (22nd)	Catherine Britt	Little WildFlower
**2008** (22nd)	Melinda Schneider	Be Yourself
**2008** (22nd)	Sara Storer	Silver Skies
**2008** (22nd)	The McClymonts	Chaos and Bright Lights
**2009** (23rd)
**2009** (23rd)	**Troy Cassar-Daley**	**I Love This Place**
**2009** (23rd)	Felicity Urquhart	Landing Lights
**2009** (23rd)	Jasmine Rae	Look It Up
**2009** (23rd)	Keith Urban	Defying Gravity
**2009** (23rd)	Shane Nicholson	Familiar Ghosts
**2010** (24th)
**2010** (24th)	**The McClymonts**	**Wrapped Up Good**
**2010** (24th)	Adam Harvey	Both Sides Now
**2010** (24th)	Catherine Britt	Catherine Britt
**2010** (24th)	Jason Walker	Ceiling Sun Letters
**2010** (24th)	Lee Kernaghan	Planet Country
**2011** (25th)
**2011** (25th)	**Kasey Chambers**	**Little Bird**
**2011** (25th)	Jasmine Rae	Listen Here
**2011** (25th)	Keith Urban	Get Closer
**2011** (25th)	Shane Nicholson	Bad Machines
**2011** (25th)	Troy Cassar-Daley	Troy Cassar-Daley Live
**2012** (26th)
**2012** (26th)	**The McClymonts**	**Two Worlds Collide**
**2012** (26th)	Beccy Cole	Songs & Pictures
**2012** (26th)	Catherine Britt	Always Never Enough
**2012** (26th)	McAlister Kemp	Country Proud
**2012** (26th)	Troy Cassar-Daley	Home
**2013** (27th)
**2013** (27th)	**Kasey Chambers** and **Shane Nicholson**	**Wreck & Ruin**
**2013** (27th)	Jasmine Rae	If I Want To
**2013** (27th)	Lee Kernaghan	Beautiful Noise
**2013** (27th)	Sara Storer	Lovegrass
**2013** (27th)	Troy Cassar-Daley and Adam Harvey	The Great Country Songbook
**2014** (28th)
**2014** (28th)	**Kasey Chambers**	**Bittersweet**
**2014** (28th)	Adam Brand	My Side of the Street
**2014** (28th)	Emma Swift	Emma Swift
**2014** (28th)	Keith Urban	Fuse
**2014** (28th)	The McClymonts	Here's to You & I
**2015** (29th)
**2015** (29th)	**Shane Nicholson**	**Hell Breaks Loose**
**2015** (29th)	Catherine Britt	Boneshaker
**2015** (29th)	Lee Kernaghan	Spirit of the Anzacs
**2015** (29th)	Mustered Courage	White Lies and Melodies
**2015** (29th)	Troy Cassar-Daley	Freedom Ride
**2016** (30th)
**2016** (30th)	**Sara Storer**	**Silos**
**2016** (30th)	Adam Brand and the Outlaws	Adam Brand and the Outlaws
**2016** (30th)	Bill Chambers	Cold Trail
**2016** (30th)	Fanny Lumsden	Small Town Big Shot
**2016** (30th)	The Wolfe Brothers	This Crazy Life
**2017** (31st)
**2017** (31st)	**Kasey Chambers**	**Dragonfly**
**2017** (31st)	Lee Kernaghan	The 25th Anniversary Album
**2017** (31st)	O'Shea	61-615
**2017** (31st)	Shane Nicholson	Love and Blood
**2017** (31st)	The McClymonts	Endless
**2018** (32nd)
**2018** (32nd)	**Kasey Chambers & the Fireside Disciples**	**Campfire**
**2018** (32nd)	Adam Eckersley & Brooke McClymont	Adam & Brooke
**2018** (32nd)	Fanny Lumsden	Real Class Act
**2018** (32nd)	The Wolfe Brothers	Country Heart
**2018** (32nd)	Travis Collins	Brave & the Broken
**2019** (33rd)
**2019** (33rd)	**Morgan Evans**	**Things That We Drink To**
**2019** (33rd)	Charlie Collins	Snowpine
**2019** (33rd)	Felicity Urquhart	Frozen Rabbit
**2019** (33rd)	Lee Kernaghan	Backroad Nation
**2019** (33rd)	Sara Storer	Raindance
**2020** (34th)
**2020** (34th)	**Fanny Lumsden**	**Fallow**
**2020** (34th)	Casey Barnes	Town of a Million Dreams
**2020** (34th)	Jasmine Rae	Lion Side
**2020** (34th)	The McClymonts	Mayhem to Madness
**2020** (34th)	Travis Collins	Wreck Me
**2021** (35th)
**2021** (35th)	**Troy Cassar-Daley**	**The World Today**
**2021** (35th)	Brad Cox	My Mind's Projection
**2021** (35th)	Felicity Urquhart & Josh Cunningham	The Song Club
**2021** (35th)	Shane Nicholson	Living in Colour
**2021** (35th)	The Wolfe Brothers	Kids on Cassette
**2022** (36th)
**2022** (36th)	**Casey Barnes**	**Light It Up**
**2022** (36th)	Adam Brand	All or Nothing
**2022** (36th)	Amber Lawrence	Living for the Highlights
**2022** (36th)	Andy Golledge	Strength of a Queen
**2022** (36th)	Georgia State Line	In Colour
**2023** (37th)
**2023** (37th)	**Fanny Lumsden**	**Hey Dawn**
**2023** (37th)	Brad Cox	Acres
**2023** (37th)	Brooke McClymont and Adam Eckersley	Up, Down & Sideways
**2023** (37th)	Henry Wagons	South Of Everywhere
**2023** (37th)	The Wolfe Brothers	Livin' The Dream
**2024** (38th)
**2024** (38th)	**Troy Cassar-Daley**	**Between the Fires**
**2024** (38th)	Casey Barnes	Mayday
**2024** (38th)	Henry Wagons	The Four Seasons
**2024** (38th)	James Johnston	Raised Like That
**2024** (38th)	Tori Forsyth	All We Have Is Who We Are
**2025** (39th)
**2025** (39th)	**Kasey Chambers**	**Backbone**
**2025** (39th)	Dylan Wright	Half a World Away
**2025** (39th)	Imogen Clark	Choking on Fuel
**2025** (39th)	Keith Urban	High
**2025** (39th)	Taylor Moss	Firecracker
**2026** (40th)
**2026** (40th)	**Rachael Fahim**	**Who You Are**
**2026** (40th)	Keith Urban	Flow State
**2026** (40th)	Max Jackson	Dangerous in Denim
**2026** (40th)	Morgan Evans	Steel Town
**2026** (40th)	Wade Forster	Gooseneck Party

== Artists with multiple wins ==
11 wins

- Kasey Chambers (Note: Including one as a member of the Dead Ringer Band.)

6 wins

- Troy Cassar-Daley

3 wins

- Shane Nicholson
- Keith Urban
- John Williamson

2 wins

- Bill Chambers (Note: While Chambers has never won as a solo artist, he won once as a member of the Dead Ringer Band and is co-credited with two others as the Fireside Disciples on his daughter Kasey's album Campfire, which won in 2018.)
- The McClymonts
- Fanny Lumsden

== Artists with multiple nominations ==
15 nominations

- Troy Cassar-Daley (Note: Including the various artists album Not So Dusty.)

13 nominations

- Kasey Chambers (Note: Including three as a member of the Dead Ringer Band.)
- Keith Urban (Note: Including the various artists albums Breaking Ground – New Directions in Country Music and Not So Dusty.)

12 nominations

- Lee Kernaghan

9 nominations

- Slim Dusty

8 nominations

- Brooke McClymont (Note: Including six as a member of the McClymonts.)

7 nominations

- Adam Brand
- Catherine Britt
- Shane Nicholson
- Sara Storer
- John Williamson

6 nominations

- James Blundell
- Bill Chambers (Note: Including three as a member of the Dead Ringer Band and Campfire, an album by his daughter Kasey on which he and two others are co-credited as the Fireside Disciples.)
- Anne Kirkpatrick
- The McClymonts

5 nominations

- Graeme Connors
- Adam Harvey

4 nominations

- Gina Jeffreys
- Fanny Lumsden
- Jasmine Rae
- Felicity Urquhart
- The Wolfe Brothers

3 nominations

- Casey Barnes
- Beccy Cole
- Dead Ringer Band
- Flying Emus
- Tania Kernaghan

2 nominations

- Audrey Auld-Mezera
- Colin Buchanan
- Travis Collins
- Brad Cox
- Adam Eckersley
- Morgan Evans
- The Happening Thang (Note: Including the various artists album Breaking Ground – New Directions in Country Music.)
- Paul Kelly
- Melinda Schneider
- Henry Wagons
- The Wheel
