= The Happening Thang =

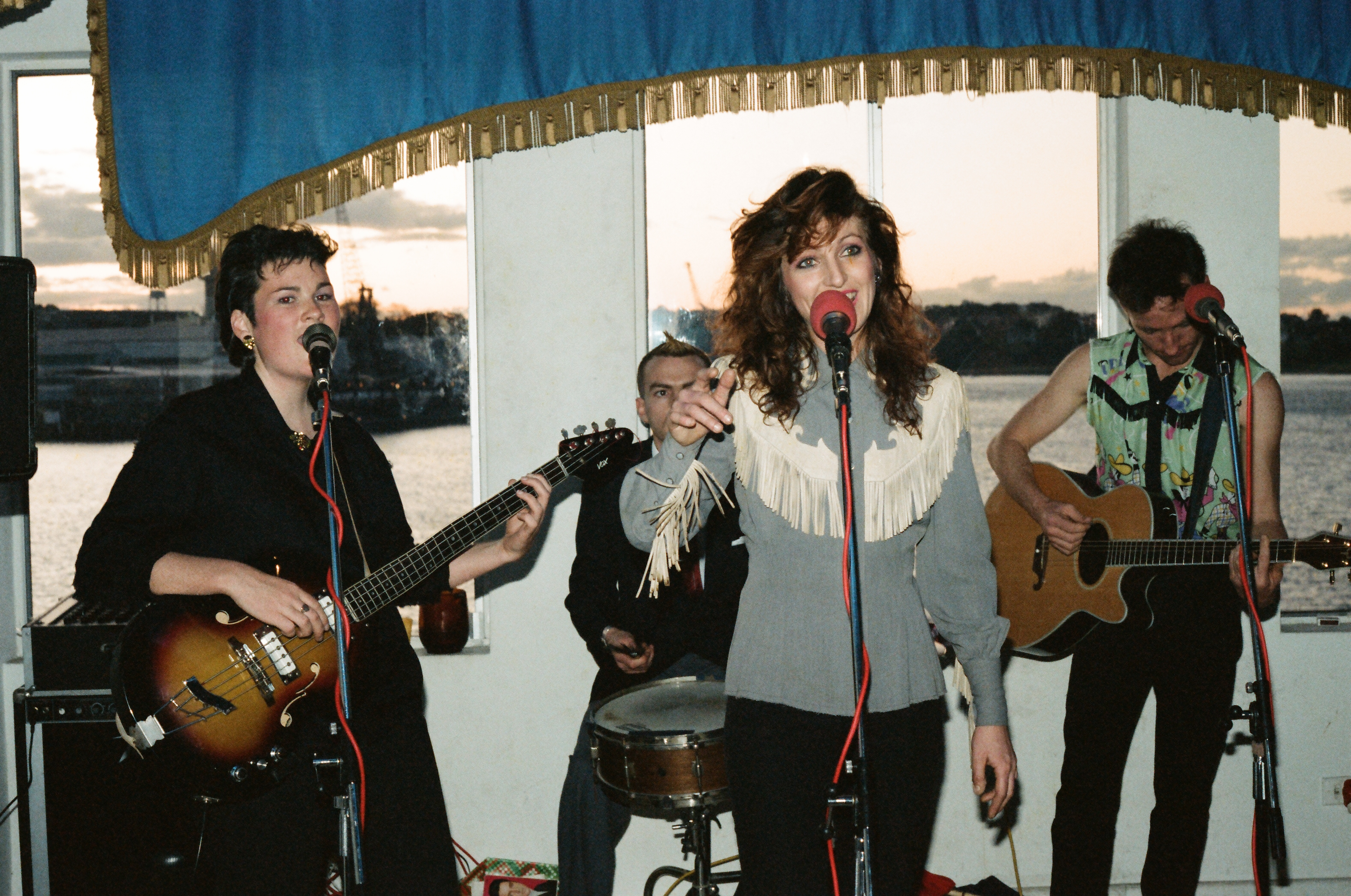
- Left to right: Rose Pearse, Dave Lennon, Catherine Wearne, Andrew Travers, Birchgrove, August 1984

Background information
- Origin: Sydney, New South Wales, Australia
- Genre: Country pop
- Years active: 1984–1991
- Label: Trafalgar/WEA
- Past members: Stuart Crysell; David Lennon; Rose Pearse; Andy Travers; Cathy Wearne; Ricky Cole; Jeff Mercer; David Patterson; Michael Kerin

The Happening Thang were an Australian country pop group formed in 1984 by Stuart Crysell on guitar, David Lennon on drums, Rose Pearse on bass guitar, Andrew Travers on acoustic guitar, vocals and harmonica, and Catherine Wearne on lead vocals. The band's line-up changed to Pearse, Travers and Wearne, Ricky Cole on drums, Jeff Mercer on guitar, mandolin and dobro, and David Patterson on bass guitar and vocals for their debut album The Happening Thang, in June 1989. Their second album Saddlepop (1990), was issued on Trafalgar/WEA. The group disbanded in 1991.

== History ==
The Happening Thang were an Australian country pop group formed in Sydney in 1984. The founding members were Stuart Crysell on electric guitar, Dave Lennon on drums, Rose Pearse on bass guitar, Andrew Travers on acoustic guitar (ex-Spitfires, Milky Bar Kids) and Catherine Wearne on lead vocals. All were house-mates and performed in other bands at the same time. In 1983 Travers had been a drummer for Adelaide-based group, the Spitfires (which issued "I Was a Teenage Teenager"), before he relocated to Sydney, now on guitar for a rockabilly group, the Milky Bar Kids from 1984 to 1986.

When the Happening Thang recorded their first album three years later for Trafalgar Records, the line-up included Rob Souter on drums and Bruce Thorburn on fiddle. Previous members had included Ian Simpson or Jenny Shimmin (banjo), Murray Cook (piano), Jim Niven (piano accordion), Wayne de Lisle on drums, Reg Mombassa on guitar (both of Mental as Anything), Mark Dawson (drums). On Stuart Crysell's departure Jeff Mercer became the guitarist, mandolin and dobro player. David Patterson replaced Rose Pearse on bass guitar and Adrien Warren (USA) on drums. Kathy Bluff replaced Bruce Thorburn for a tour of Canada in 1989. While still a member of the Happening Thang, Travers guested on drums on Neil Murray's debut album, Calm and Crystal Clear (April 1989).

Australian musicologist, Ian McFarlane, described how the Happening Thang, "combined Hank Williams-style country roots with pop melodies to produce an uplifting, Australian urban and western sound. Other influences included Gram Parsons, Jimmie Rodgers and early Elvis Presley." They issued their debut single, "I Don't Wanna Go To Work" in February 1989. At the Australasian Country Music Awards, in January of the following year, they won New Talent of the Year for the song. Kathryn Whitfield of The Canberra Times, in March 1989, had felt that "I Don't Wanna Go to Work" was "repetitive garble. Twanging, monotonous tripe, which even the most ardent of country and western (or both) fans would find hard to bear. It's very Australia, very country, but very boring!"

Their second single, "Drive Away", appeared in July 1989 and was followed in December by an eponymous album on Trafalgar/WEA. Most of its tracks were written by Travers. For that album the line-up of the group was Mercer, Patterson, Travers and Wearne, which was augmented by additional musicians: Pearse on vocals and bass guitar, Kathy Bluff on fiddle, Murray Cook on piano, Jim Niven on piano accordion, Dave Faulkner on piano, Peter O'Doherty on backing vocals, Ian Simpson on pedal steel guitar, Robert Souter on drums, and Bruce Thorburn on fiddle. At the ARIA Music Awards of 1990 it was nominated for Best Country Album. They appeared on the 1990 compilation album Breaking Ground - New Directions in Country Music which was nominated for the same award in 1991.

The Happening Thang's second album, Saddlepop (1990), provided a single: their cover version of Neil Young's "The Losing End". For this album the group's core members were Michael Kerin on fiddle, Mercer on electric guitar, mandolin, dobro and backing vocals, Patterson on bass guitar and backing vocals, Ross Burge on drums, Travers on lead vocals, electric, rhythm, and acoustic guitars, and Wearne on vocals. They were assisted in the studio by Bluff and Cook; it was co-produced by Rod Coe and the band. The group supported Canberran conservationist project Rock for the Forests in October 1990, which The Canberra Times writer observed, "[they] combine a reverence for country music with some of the more unusual elements of rock and new wave." The group broke up late in 1991.

After the group disbanded Travers joined Dog Trumpet, in 1995, on drums, alongside that band's founders O'Doherty on guitar, mandolin and bass guitar, and his brother, Reg Mombassa on guitar and lead vocals. They were joined by Amanda Brown on violin and backing vocals (ex-The Go-Betweens). That line-up issued an album, Suitcase (January 1996).

In the mid-2000s Mercer and Patterson formed a country music group, the Cartwheels, in Hepburn Springs. The line-up included Patterson's wife, Wendy Phypers, on rhythm guitar and vocals, and their son, Charley Phypers, on drums.

In 2014, founding members, Travers and Wearne co-founded The Western Distributors, a country/pop band, with Guy Donnellan and released a 13-track self titled album in March 2018.

== Discography ==
=== Albums ===
Title	Details
The Happening Thang	Released: June 1989; Label: Trafalgar/WEA (256182/1)
Saddlepop	Released: 1990; Label: Trafalgar/WEA (903172617-1)

=== Singles ===
Year	Title
1989	"I Don't Wanna Go to Work"
1989	"Drive Away"
1990	"Losing End"

== Awards and nominations ==
=== ARIA Music Awards ===
The ARIA Music Awards are a set of annual ceremonies presented by Australian Recording Industry Association (ARIA), which recognise excellence, innovation, and achievement across all genres of the music of Australia. They commenced in 1987.

Year	Nominee / work	Award	Result	Ref.
1990	The Happening Thang	Best Country Album	Nominated	

=== Country Music Awards of Australia ===
The Country Music Awards of Australia (CMAA) (also known as the Golden Guitar Awards) is an annual awards night held in January during the Tamworth Country Music Festival, celebrating recording excellence in the Australian country music industry. They have been held annually since 1973.

Year	Nominee / work	Award	Result
1990	The Happening Thang	New Talent of the Year	Won

- Note: wins only

=== Mo Awards ===
The Mo Awards is an annual awards night, celebrating excellence in the Australian variety show industry. They have been held annually since 1975.

Year	Nominee / work	Award	Result
1991	The Happening Thang	Country Showgroup	Won
1990	The Happening Thang	Country Showgroup	Won
1989	The Happening Thang	Country Showgroup	Won
