= Big River (Troy Cassar-Daley album) =

Studio album by Troy Cassar-Daley
- Released: August 1999
- Genre: Country
- Producer: Garth Porter

Troy Cassar-Daley chronology
True Believer (1997)	Big River (1999)	Long Way Home (2002)

Big River is the third studio album by Australian country music artist Troy Cassar-Daley. It was released in August 1999 and peaked at number 49 on the ARIA Charts. The name of the album was in memory of the area of his Grafton home. At the 2000 Australia Country Music Awards, Troy won Best Male Vocal and Song of The Year for "They Don't Make 'Em Like That Anymore".

At the ARIA Music Awards of 2000, the album won the ARIA Award for Best Country Album.

== Track listing ==
No.	Title	Length
1.	"They Don't Make 'Em Like That Anymore"	3:59
2.	"Big River Country"	3:56
3.	"I Wanna Go Back"	3:50
4.	"All Over Town"	3:19
5.	"The Other Side of Lonely"	3:26
6.	"Trains"	3:51
7.	"It's Never Too Late"	4:04
8.	"Time to Say Good-Bye"	3:41
9.	"Under Your Spell Again"	2:57
10.	"I Want to Walk That Road with You"	3:31
11.	"V8 Town"	3:21
12.	"One Big Land"	3:25
13.	"When a Small Town Dies" (bonus track)	3:28
14.	"The Droving Days" (bonus track)	4:06

== Charts ==
Chart (1999)	Peak position
Australian Albums (ARIA)	49

== Certifications ==
Region	Certification	Certified units/sales
Australia (ARIA)	Gold	35,000^{^}
^{^} Shipments figures based on certification alone.

== Release history ==
Country	Date	Format	Label	Catalogue
Australia	August 1999	CD, Cassette	CBS Records	495236
