= Between the Fires =

Studio album by Troy Cassar-Daley
- Released: 10 May 2024
- Genre: Country
- Length: 70:02
- Label: Sony Australia
- Producer: Troy Cassar-Daley

Troy Cassar-Daley chronology
50 Songs 50 Towns (2022)	Between the Fires (2024)

Between the Fires is the fourteenth studio album by Australian country music singer Troy Cassar-Daley. The album was announced in February and released on 10 May 2024. It was supported by a 33-date tour around Australia, commencing in May 2024.

Cassar-Daley said "The new album was recorded at my Late Mum's old place at Halfway Creek and is incredibly special on many levels. It's the place I moved to when my nan Daley died in 1979 and where I lived for many years."

The track "Windradyne" is about Wiradjuri warrior Windradyne, who was involved in the Australian Frontier Wars, trying to defend his people.

The album was nominated for Album of the Year at the National Indigenous Music Awards 2024.

At the 2024 ARIA Music Awards, the album was nominated for Best Country Album, Best Cover Art and for Cassar-Daley, Best Solo Artist, winning Best Country Album.

At the 2025 Country Music Awards of Australia, the album won Album of the Year and Alt/Americana Country Album At the 2025 Queensland Music Awards, it won Album of the Year.

== Track listing ==
All tracks are written by Troy Cassar-Daley, except where noted.

Between the Fires track listing
No.	Title	Length
1.	"Between the Fires"	4:55
2.	"Every Other Day"	5:02
3.	"Let's Ride"	4:16
4.	"We Still Have a Chance"	5:06
5.	"Somedays" (Cassar-Daley, Kevin Bennett)	3:53
6.	"Old Road Home"	4:39
7.	"Windradyne"	3:56
8.	"Good and Bad"	4:35
9.	"Ready for the Rain"	3:35
10.	"Dreams"	4:45
11.	"This World Alone" (Cassar-Daley, Don Walker)	4:11
12.	"Thankful"	5:20
13.	"Till I Get Over You" (Cassar-Daley, Walker)	4:09
14.	"Congratulations"	6:59
15.	"Moving On"	4:41
Total length:		70:02

LP bonus tracks (Side D)
No.	Title	Length
1.	"Lets Ride" (acoustic demo)
2.	"Somedays" (acoustic demo)
3.	"Windradyne" (acoustic demo)
4.	"Good and Bad" (acoustic demo)
5.	"Dreams" (acoustic demo)

== Personnel ==
Musicians

- Troy Cassar-Daley – lead vocals (all tracks), banjo (tracks 2–4, 9, 11), electric guitar (3, 11, 12), acoustic guitar (5–9, 14, 15), harmonica (6)
- Scott Hills – drums (all tracks), tambourine (tracks 6, 10)
- Jeff McCormack – bass
- Ollie Thorpe – pedal steel guitar
- Michael Muchow – electric guitar (tracks 1–4, 6, 8–14), acoustic guitar (1–4, 9, 10, 13), mandolin (5–7, 9, 15)
- Jem Cassar-Daley – background vocals (tracks 2, 4, 5)
- Kasey Chambers – background vocals (track 3)
- Clay Cassar-Daley – background vocals (track 7)
- Rod McCormack – banjo (track 7)
- Ian Peres – organ (tracks 9–14), piano (15)
- Gabi Blissett – strings (track 15)

Technical

- Troy Cassar-Daley – production
- Jeff McCormack – mastering
- Jordan Power – mixing, engineering

== Charts ==
=== Weekly charts ===
Weekly chart performance for Between the Fires
Chart (2024)	Peak position
Australian Albums (ARIA)	2
Australian Country Albums (ARIA)	1

=== Year-end charts ===
2024 year-end chart performance for Between the Fires
Chart (2024)	Position
Australian Artist Albums (ARIA)	30

== Release history ==
Release history and formats for Between the Fires
Country	Date	Format	Label	Catalogue	Reference
Australia	10 May 2024	CD, digital download, 2×LP, streaming	Sony Music Australia	19658875352 / 19658877881	
