= Breaking Ground – New Directions in Country Music =

Compilation album by Various artists
- Released: 1990
- Label: ABC Records

Singles from Breaking Ground – New Directions in Country Music
- 1. "Wait for the Light To Shine"

Breaking Ground – New Directions in Country Music is a compilation album of Australian contemporary country music. It was produced by John Spence and released in Australia by ABC Records in 1990. It was nominated for a 1991 ARIA Award for Best Country Album. The album inspired two Breaking Ground concerts which featured many of the artists that appeared on the release. The album was nominated for Album of the Year at the 1991 Australasian Country Music Awards. Anne Kirkpatrick's contribution saw her nominated for Female Vocalist of the Year at the same awards.

== Singles ==
The album's last track, "Wait for the Light To Shine", was released as a single, backed by "Up on the Mountain" (instrumental).

== Awards ==
Year	Award-giving body	Award	Result
1991	ARIA Music Awards	Best Country Album	Nominated

== Track listing ==
1. Until the Next Big Dry – James Blundell
2. Prodigal Son – The Kanes
3. There's a Light On – Keith Urban
4. Till You Love Me Again – Anne Kirkpatrick
5. Loosen My Necktie – The Danglin' Bros
6. Up on the Mountain – The Breaking Ground Band
7. How Come – Blue Healers
8. Time Will Tell – The Happening Thang
9. It Makes No Difference – Jenine Vaughan
10. Lonesome, Lonely & Alone – Mary-Jo Starr
11. Country Man – Fargone Beauties
12. Wait for the Light to Shine – Various

The final track on the album was performed by all of the artists that appear on the earlier tracks.
