= Lost & Found (Troy Cassar-Daley album) =

Compilation album by Troy Cassar-Daley
- Released: 28 March 2018
- Genre: Country
- Length: 84:48
- Label: Liberation Music
- Producer: Troy Cassar-Daley

Troy Cassar-Daley chronology
Things I Carry Around (2016)	Lost & Found (2018)	Greatest Hits (2018)

Lost & Found is a compilation album by Australian country music artist Troy Cassar-Daley. The album was released digitally in March 2018.

Upon release Cassar-Daley said “Lost & Found is a collection of songs that have only been B-sides on singles or never been commercially available anywhere.” He added “I opened up an old suitcase in the corner of my studio that I've had since my teens and found tapes, old lyrics and CDs of tunes I'd forgotten I'd written. So I set up my tape deck, DAT player and CD player to listen and the first thing that came to mind was these need to be shared not stored and forgotten by time.“

The album includes Cassar-Daley's debut single "Proud Young Man", only ever available before on 7" vinyl.

== Track listing ==
No.	Title	Writer(s)	Length
1.	"Proud Young Man"	Troy Cassar-Daley	3:08
2.	"Should Have Been There"	Cassar-Daley	3:16
3.	"The River of Sorrow"	Cassar-Daley, Heather Field, James Gillard	4:17
4.	"Wet a Line"	Cassar-Daley, Colin Buchanan, Garth Porter	2:33
5.	"That's Why I'm Your Friend"	Cassar-Daley	3:02
6.	"If You Ever Think of Me"	Cassar-Daley	3:37
7.	"Goin' Straight"	Cassar-Daley, Porter	3:02
8.	"Almost Home"	Cassar-Daley	3:44
9.	"Original Australian Working Man"	Cassar-Daley	3:19
10.	"You Can't Take the Country Out of the Boy"	Cassar-Daley	2:46
11.	"Back Home Again"	John Denver	4:48
12.	"You'll Never Know 'Till You Try"	Cassar-Daley	3:38
13.	"Always Running"	Cassar-Daley	3:13
14.	"Music Man"	Cassar-Daley	3:44
15.	"Love Me"	Cassar-Daley	3:33
16.	"Your Broken Heart Gets in the Way"	Cassar-Daley, Michael Smotherman	2:35
17.	"The Biggest Disappointment" (featuring Slim Dusty)	Joy McKean	3:13
18.	"Ramblin' Man" (featuring Tommy Emmanuel)	Dickey Betts	3:51
19.	"Someday"	Steve Earle	3:29
20.	"Long Black Veil"	Marijohn Wilkin, Danny Dill	3:25
21.	"Everthing's Going to Be Alright"	Cassar-Daley, Walker	3:39
22.	"Last Mile Home"	Cassar-Daley	3:22
23.	"Yesterday's Bed"	Cassar-Daley, Milton Brown	4:18
24.	"Down in the River to Pray" (featuring Laurel, Clay and Jem Cassar-Daley)	(traditional)	3:26
25.	"Language Song"	(traditional)	1:49

== Charts ==
Chart (2018)	Position
Australian Digital Albums (ARIA)	45

== Release history ==
Country	Date	Format	Label	Catalogue
Australia	28 March 2018	digital download, streaming	Liberation Records	9341004057951
