= Jenine Vaughan =

- Genres: Country

Jenine Anne Vaughan (born 1972) is an Australian country music singer and former television presenter.

After performing locally in Rockhampton, Queensland, Vaughan's breakthrough came in 1988 when she won the Toyota Star Maker Quest at the 1988 Country Music Awards of Australia in Tamworth, New South Wales, beating out 19 other finalists. As part of her prize, RCA Records produced her debut single, "Gypsy Man", which tells the story of a woman being left at home while her partner travels around the country.

Vaughan subsequently won the "New Talent of the Year" category at the following year's awards ceremony.

"Gypsy Man" was nominated for a 1989 ARIA Award for Best Country Album and she appeared on Breaking Ground - New Directions in Country Music which was nominated for the same award in 1991.

Prior to her success, Vaughan was already a regular face on local television in Central Queensland, having commenced work as a presenter in 1987 at Rockhampton station RTQ, where she hosted a children's television program called Small Talk.

== Discography ==
=== Singles ===
Title	Year
"Gypsy Man"	1988
"The Weight"	1989

== Awards ==
=== ARIA Music Awards ===
The ARIA Music Awards are a set of annual ceremonies presented by Australian Recording Industry Association (ARIA), which recognise excellence, innovation, and achievement across all genres of the music of Australia. They commenced in 1987.

Year	Nominee / work	Award	Result	Ref.
1989	"Gypsy Man"	Best Country Album	Nominated	

=== Country Music Awards of Australia ===
The Country Music Awards of Australia (CMAA) (also known as the Golden Guitar Awards) is an annual awards night held in January during the Tamworth Country Music Festival, celebrating recording excellence in the Australian country music industry. They have been held annually since 1973.

Year	Nominee / work	Award	Result
1989	"Gypsy Man"	New Talent of the Year	Won

- Note: wins only
