= Brent Parlane =

- Born: New Zealand
- Genres: Country

Brent Parlane is a country music musician and songwriter. His self-titled album was nominated for a 1993 ARIA Award for Best Country Album and he won the 1993 Golden Guitar for Best New Talent and has been a finalist on four occasions.

Parlane was born in New Zealand and moved to Australia in 1976. His first solo album was a self-financed and self-produced live album. He then signed with ABC Country.

Parlane was a member of New Zealand country rock band Beech, which released a single, "Head For Home"/"Ready To Run" (1975), through White Cloud. The band's lineup was Parlane (guitar and vocals), Andrew Forrer (bass), Andrew Kay (keyboards), Phil Jones (guitar and vocals), Ron Mahony (drums) and later Donald Bean (drums).

In Australia Parlane formed 33° South (previously called Tourists) with Forrer, Kay, Co Tipping (guitar) and Dave Cail (drums). The band put out two singles through Polydor Records: "This Time It's Love"/"Something To Believe In" (1979) and "Mr President"/"Baby Jane" (1980). These were followed by an album, 33° South (1980).

== Discography ==
=== Albums ===
Title	Album details
Come On You Guys This Is Serious!	Released: 1982; Label: EMI Custom Records (YPRX-1957)
Guitar Army	Released: 1988; Label: Mr. Wonderful Records
Brent Parlane	Released: 1992; Label: ABC Country
Tex Loves Daisy	Released: 1994; Label: ABC Country (4797812)
The Closest	Released: September 1999; Label: Shoestring Records Australia (SR 43)
Good Man Down	Released: 2001; Label: Shoestring Records Australia (SR 45)
The Happy Note	Released: 2003; Label: Shoestring Records Australia
Little Revolution	Released: 2006; Label: Shoestring Records Australia
This Wonderful Parade	Released: 2011
Brent Parlane Band (as Brent Parlane Band)	Released: 2016

== Awards and nominations ==
=== ARIA Music Awards ===
The ARIA Music Awards are a set of annual ceremonies presented by Australian Recording Industry Association (ARIA), which recognise excellence, innovation, and achievement across all genres of the music of Australia. They commenced in 1987.

Year	Nominee / work	Award	Result	Ref.
1993	Brent Parlane	Best Country Album	Nominated	

=== Country Music Awards of Australia ===
The Country Music Awards of Australia (CMAA) (also known as the Golden Guitar Awards) is an annual awards night held in January during the Tamworth Country Music Festival, celebrating recording excellence in the Australian country music industry. They have been held annually since 1973.

Year	Nominee / work	Award	Result
1993	himself - "Save a Little Love"	New Talent of the Year	Won

- Note: wins only
