= Lou Bradley =

Australian alternative country singer

- Genres: Alternative country

Lou Bradley is an Australian alternative country singer. Her debut album Love Someone was nominated for the ARIA Award for Best Country Album.

== Discography ==
=== Albums ===
Title	Album details
Love Someone	Released: 2007; Label: Lou Bradley
La La La Not Listening	Released: 2009; Label: Lou Bradley (CD006722)
The Other Side	Released: August 2014; Label: Lou Bradley
Moonshine	Released: 2015; Label: Lou Bradley

== Awards and nominations ==
=== ARIA Music Awards ===
The ARIA Music Awards are a set of annual ceremonies presented by Australian Recording Industry Association (ARIA), which recognise excellence, innovation, and achievement across all genres of the music of Australia. They commenced in 1987.

Year	Nominee / work	Award	Result	Ref.
2007	Love Someone	Best Country Album	Nominated	
