= Kedron Taylor =

Australian country musician (born 1963)

- Born: Francis Kedron Schneider; 1963 (age 62–63); Mackay, Queensland
- Genres: Country

Kedron Taylor is an Australian country musician. His album Every Place I Go was nominated for a 1999 ARIA Award for Best Country Album and he has been nominated for five golden guitars.

== Discography ==
=== Albums ===
Title	Album details
Every Place I Go	Released: 1998; Label: Massive (7321812)

== Awards and nominations ==
=== ARIA Music Awards ===
The ARIA Music Awards is an annual awards ceremony held by the Australian Recording Industry Association. They commenced in 1987.

Year	Nominee / work	Award	Result	Ref.
1999	Every Place I Go	Best Country Album	Nominated	
