= Troy Cassar-Daley Live =

Live album by Troy Cassar-Daley
- Released: 22 October 2010
- Recorded: 23 June 2010
- Venues: The York Theatre, Sydney
- Genre: Country
- Label: Liberation Music

Troy Cassar-Daley chronology
I Love This Place (2009)	Troy Cassar-Daley Live (2010)	The Essential Troy Cassar-Daley (2011)

Troy Cassar-Daley Live is the first live album by Australian country musician Troy Cassar-Daley. The album was recorded at The York Theatre, Sydney on 23 June 2010, during Cassar-Daley's "I Love This Place Tour". The album was released as a 2xCD and DVD on 22 October 2010.

At the ARIA Music Awards of 2011, the album was nominated for Best Country Album.

== Track listing ==
CD1
No.	Title	Length
1.	"Sing About This Country"	3:31
2.	"They Don't Make 'Em Like That Anymore"	3:49
3.	"River Town"	3:46
4.	"Bar Room Roses"	3:34
5.	"Lonesome But Free"	5:37
6.	"I Love This Place"	3:49
7.	"Chasin' Rodeo"	3:27
8.	"Make the Most (of Everyday With You)"	4:04
9.	"Brighter Day"	4:05
10.	"River Boy"	3:00
11.	"I Wish I Was a Train"	3:40
12.	"Bird on a Wire" (featuring Jimmy Barnes)	3:57
13.	"Born to Survive"	4:44

CD2
No.	Title	Writer(s)	Length
1.	"Everything's Going to Be Alright"		3:52
2.	"Yesterday's Bed"		4:16
3.	"Bean Pickin' Blues"		4:35
4.	"Biggest Disappointment" (featuring Joy McKean)	Joy McKean	4:14
5.	"This Town is Me"		4:24
6.	"Losin' My Blues Tonight"		3:21
7.	"Little Things"		3:27
8.	"Trains"		4:00
9.	"People Get Ready"		4:52
10.	"Country Boy (Lost in the City)"		3:02
11.	"This Day Is Mine"		4:06
12.	"Dream Out Loud"		5:19
13.	"Big, Big Love"		3:42

== Charts ==
Chart (2010)	Peak position
Australian Top 40 Music DVD	20

== Certifications ==
Region	Certification	Certified units/sales
Australia (ARIA)	Gold	7,500^{^}
^{^} Shipments figures based on certification alone.

== Release history ==
Country	Date	Format	Label	Catalogue
Australia	22 October 2010	2xCD	Liberation Music	LMCD0117
Australia	22 October 2010	DVD	Liberation	LIBDVD1111
