= Tina Martyn =

- Genres: Country

Tina Martyn, is a Country Music singer from Newcastle, New South Wales. Her single "Lying in My Bed" was nominated for the 1997 ARIA Award for Best Country Release and earlier that year she won a Golden Guitar Award for Best New Talent.

== Discography ==
- "Lying in My Bed"
- "Wham Bam"

== Awards and nominations ==
=== ARIA Awards ===
he ARIA Music Awards is an annual awards ceremony that recognises excellence, innovation, and achievement across all genres of Australian music.

Year	Nominee / work	Award	Result
1997	"Lying in My Bed"	Best Country Album	Nominated

=== Country Music Awards of Australia ===
The Country Music Awards of Australia (CMAA) (also known as the Golden Guitar Awards) is an annual awards night held in January during the Tamworth Country Music Festival, celebrating recording excellence in the Australian country music industry. They have been held annually since 1973.

Year	Nominee / work	Award	Result
1997	herself	New Talent of the Year	Won
