= Who Are You (disambiguation) =

Who Are You is a 1978 album by The Who.

Who Are You also may refer to:

== Music ==
- Who Are You? (album), a 2008 album by Nico Touches the Walls
- Who Are You? (EP), a 2013 EP by Kahi
- "Who Are You" (song), by the Who, 1978
- "Who Are You", a song by Black Sabbath from Sabbath Bloody Sabbath
- "Who Are You", a song by Tom Waits from Bone Machine
- "Who Are You", a song by Carrie Underwood from Blown Away
- "Who Are You", a song by Jolin Tsai from 1019
- "Who Are You", a song by Show Lo from Show Time
- "Who Are You?", a 1996 song by Eternal from Power of a Woman
- "Who are You?", a 1982 song by Void
- "Who Are You", a song by Fifth Harmony from Better Together

== Film and television ==
- Who Are You? (2008 TV series), a South Korean television series
- Who Are You? (2013 TV series), a South Korean television series
- Who Are You: School 2015, a South Korean television series
- Who Are You (Thai TV series), a Thai television series
- Who Are You? (1939 film), an Italian comedy film
- Who Are You? (2001 film), a Portuguese historical drama film
- Yaare Neenu Cheluve (lit. 'Who Are You'), a 1998 Indian Telugu-language film

=== Television episodes ===
- "Who Are You?" (Andor), an episode of Andor
- "Who Are You?" (Arrow), an episode of the American television series Arrow
- "Who Are You?" (Batwoman), an episode of the American television series Batwoman
- "Who Are You" (Buffy the Vampire Slayer), an episode of the American television series Buffy the Vampire Slayer
- "Who Are You?" (CSI), an episode of CSI: Crime Scene Investigation

== See also ==
- Who You Are (disambiguation)
