= 50 Songs 50 Towns =

Live album by Troy Cassar-Daley
- Released: 12 August 2022
- Recorded: 2019
- Genre: Country
- Label: Sony Music Australia

Troy Cassar-Daley chronology
| The World Today (2021) | 50 Songs 50 Towns (2022) | Between the Fires (2024) |

50 Songs 50 Towns is a live album by Australian country music artist Troy Cassar-Daley. The album was released on 12 August 2022 and peaked at number 8 on the ARIA Charts.

== Background and release ==
In 2021, Cassar-Daley planned to select 20 songs from his Greatest Hits 2019 Acoustic Tour. He had recorded every sound check, VIP event and show. For Cassar-Daley, every set was different which made the decision process a very hard one, landing him at 50 songs and 50 towns to share.

The album was released as a 3×CD on 12 August 2022. The digital version was released as five installments of 10 tracks between June and August 2022.

== Track listings ==
CD 1

1. "Going Back Home" (Live from Milton, NSW)
2. "Sing About This Country" (Live from Blacktown, NSW)
3. "Doing Time" (Live from Gympie, QLD)
4. "River Road" (Live from Blackhall, QLD)
5. "Take a Walk in My Country" (Live from Bathurst, NSW)
6. "Get Away Car" (featuring Jem Cassar-Daley) (Live from Noojee, VIC)
7. "Down the Road" (Live from Port Hedland, WA)
8. "How's the World Treating You" (featuring Jem Cassar-Daley) (Live from Newcastle, NSW]
9. "Shadows On the Hill" (Live from Melbourne, VIC)
10. "Halfway Creek Timber Cutting Man" (Live from Yamba, NSW)
11. "Ladies in My Life" (Live from Launceston, TAS)
12. "Home" (featuring Jem Cassar-Daley) (Live from Ballina, NSW)
13. "Lights On the Hill" (Live from Wagga Wagga, NSW)
14. "I Love This Place" (Live from Tamworth, NSW)
15. "The Biggest Disappointment" (Live from Casino, NSW)
16. "Lonesome But Free" (Live from Berry, NSW)
17. "Bird on a Wire" (Live from Dubbo, NSW)

CD 2

1. "Make the Most" (Of Everyday With You) (Live from Canberra, ACT)
2. "Family Farm" (Live from Tanunda, SA)
3. "Oh My Sweet Carolina" (featuring Jem Cassar-Daley) (Live from Hahndorf, SA)
4. "The World Today" (Live from Geelong, VIC)
5. "Little Things" (Live from Kedron, QLD)
6. "Wish I Was a Train" (Live from Mt Morgan, QLD)
7. "Gunbalanya" (Live from Oenpelli, NT)
8. "Fisherman" (Live from Mulwala, NSW)
9. "Trains" / "Bar Room Roses" (Live from Yackandandah, VIC)
10. "Wouldn't Change a Thing" (Live from Caloundra, QLD)
11. "Everything's Going to Be Alright" (Live from Queenscliff, VIC)
12. "Sing Me Back Home" (Live from Ingham, QLD)
13. "Bean Picking Blues" (Live from Mudgee, NSW)
14. "Freedom Ride" (Live from Tenterfield, NSW)
15. "That's the Way Love Goes" (featuring Jem Cassar-Daley) (Live from Kingaroy, QLD)
16. "Big Big Love" (Live from South West Rocks, NSW)

CD 3

1. "Till I Gain Control Again" (Live from Queenstown, TAS)
2. "Away from Here" (Live from Hobart, TAS)
3. "Language Song" (Live from Jabiru, NT)
4. "True Believer" (Live from Ipswich, QLD)
5. "River Boy" (Live from Coffs Harbour, NSW)
6. "Things I Carry Around" (Live from Crossley, VIC)
7. "Bow River" (Live from Darwin, NT)
8. "Thinking About Drinking" (Live from Perth, WA)
9. "My Dreaming Place" (Live from Brisbane, QLD)
10. "They Don't Make 'em Like That Anymore" (Live from Bairnsdale, VIC)
11. "Brighter Day" (Live from Mackay, QLD)
12. "Dream Out Loud" (Live from Wonthaggi, VIC)
13. "Droving Days" (Live from Winnaleah, TAS)
14. "My Island Home" (Live from Coutts Crossing, NSW)
15. "Shutting Down Our Town" (Live from Thirroul, NSW)
16. "My Gumbaynggirr Skies" (Live from Cairns, QLD)
17. "Born to Survive" (Live from Mandurah, WA)

== Charts ==
Chart performance for 50 Songs 50 Towns
| Chart (2022) | Peak position |
|---|---|
| Australian Albums (ARIA) | 8 |

== Release history ==
Release history and formats for 50 Songs 50 Towns
| Region | Date | Format | Edition(s) | Label | Catalog # | Ref. |
|---|---|---|---|---|---|---|
| World | 17 June 2022 | download; streaming | Volume 1 | Tarampa Music | — | |
| World | 1 July 2022 | download; streaming | Volume 2 | Tarampa Music | — | |
| World | 15 July 2022 | download; streaming | Volume 3 | Tarampa Music | — | |
| World | 29 July 2022 | download; streaming | Volume 4 | Tarampa Music | — | |
| World | 12 August 2022 | download; streaming | Volume 5 | Tarampa Music | — | |
| Australia | 12 August 2022 | 3xCD | complete | Sony Music Australia | 19658722012 | |
