= Luhrs & Crawford =

Australian music duo

Luhrs and Crawford
- Origin: Wagga Wagga
- Genres: Country
- Years active: 1982 - 1991
- Members: Grant Luhrs; Hugh Crawford

Luhrs and Crawford is an Australian Country music duo of Grant Luhrs and Hugh Crawford. Their album Midnight in Paradise was nominated for a 1991 ARIA Award for Best Country Album.

== Discography ==
=== Albums ===
| Title | Details |
|---|---|
| Midnight in Paradise | Released: 1990; Label: RCA (VPCD 0819) |

== Awards and nominations ==
=== ARIA Music Awards ===
The ARIA Music Awards are a set of annual ceremonies presented by Australian Recording Industry Association (ARIA), which recognise excellence, innovation, and achievement across all genres of the music of Australia. They commenced in 1987.

| Year | Nominee / work | Award | Result | Ref. |
|---|---|---|---|---|
| 1991 | Midnight in Paradise | Best Country Album | Nominated | |
