= Who You Are (Rachael Fahim album) =

Studio album by Rachael Fahim
- Released: 1 May 2026
- Length: 30:14
- Labels: Island Australia; Universal Australia
- Producers: Roberto De Sá; Michael Horneman; James Lewis; Ben Oldland; Liam Quinn; Daniel Skeed; Greg Stace

Rachael Fahim chronology
| Iconic (2020) | Who You Are (2026) |

Singles from Who You Are
- 1. "Dance Around It" Released: 1 November 2024; 2. "Good Luck" Released: 24 January 2025; 3. "Who You Are" Released: 4 July 2025; 4. "Too Damn Hot" Released: 3 October 2025; 5. "Never Coming Back" Released: 16 January 2026; 6. "Deep End" Released: 20 March 2026; 7. "Take It Back" Released: 1 May 2026

Who You Are is the debut studio album by the Australian country singer Rachael Fahim. The album was announced in January 2026 and released on 1 May 2026. The album was supported by an Australian tour.

Upon announcement, Fahim said "[The album] is about that moment when you realise you aren't heartbroken anymore. It captures the power shift when self-respect kicks in, the late-night calls stop working, and closure comes (with a side of sass of course hehe) It's defiant, healed and rooted in the clarity that sometimes the best comeback is no comeback at all - it's just leaving."

The album peaked at number 22 on the ARIA Charts.

At the APRA Music Awards of 2026, the title track won Most Performed Country Work of the Year.

At the 2026 ARIA Music Awards, the album won Best Country Album and was also nominated for Michael Gudinski Breakthrough Artist.

== Reception ==
Rolling Stone Australia said "Rachael Fahim's highly anticipated debut album Who You Are brings together a collection of raw and honest modern country-pop songs. The album reflects her undeniable talent for distilling complex emotions into relatable lyrics and storytelling."

Sophie Hamley from Sunburnt Country call it a "blockbuster debut album" saying, "Substance is also apparent on Who You Are. Fahim has the ability to create songs that are eminently danceable but which also make you stop and think."

== Track listing ==
Who You Are track listing
| No. | Title | Writer(s) | Producer(s) | Length |
|---|---|---|---|---|
| 1. | "Never Coming Back" | Rachael Fahim; Roberto De Sá; Liyah Knight; Shawn Mayer; Ned Philpot; Vlado Saric | De Sá | 2:51 |
| 2. | "Who You Are" | Fahim; Liam Quinn; Saric; Keenan Te | Quinn; De Sá^{[a]}; Michael Horneman^{[a]}; Daniel Skeed^{[a]}; Greg Stace^{[a]} | 3:21 |
| 3. | "Deep End" | Fahim; Ben Banton; Josh Banton; Te | Quinn; Horneman^{[a]}; Skeed^{[a]}; Stace^{[a]} | 3:25 |
| 4. | "Good Luck" | Fahim; James Johnston; Stace; Vendulka Wichta | Stace | 3:21 |
| 5. | "Take It Back" | Fahim; Olivia Regueira Garcia; Quinn | Quinn; De Sá^{[a]}; Horneman^{[a]}; Skeed^{[a]}; Stace^{[a]} | 3:38 |
| 6. | "Dance Around It" | Fahim; Ebony Deluca; Ben Oldland | Horneman; James Lewis; Oldland; Quinn; Skeed; Stace | 2:26 |
| 7. | "Easy at That" | Fahim; Garcia; Quinn | Quinn; Horneman^{[a]}; Skeed^{[a]}; Stace^{[a]} | 2:44 |
| 8. | "Too Damn Hot" | Fahim; Jarne Aktun; Quinn; Angela Rose | De Sá; Quinn | 3:14 |
| 9. | "Waste of Makeup" | Fahim; Ingrid Oram; Mitchell Thompson | Quinn; De Sá^{[a]}; Horneman^{[a]}; Skeed^{[a]}; Stace^{[a]} | 2:21 |
| 10. | "You Suck" | Fahim; Alex Borel; Charlie Oriain; Stace | De Sá | 2:53 |
| Total length: | | | | 30:14 |

=== Note ===
- ^{^[a]} indicates an additional producer

== Personnel ==
Credits are adapted from the album's liner notes and Tidal.

- Rachael Fahim – vocals
- Roberto De Sá – mixing
- Scott Horscroft – mixing
- James Lewis – Atmos mixing
- George Georgiadis – mastering
- Cybele Malinowski – photography
- Connor Dewhurst – design
- Dan Skeed – bass, guitar (1–3, 5, 7, 9, 10)
- Michael Horneman – guitar (1–5, 7, 9, 10)
- Vlado Saric – background vocals (1–3, 5, 7, 9, 10)
- Jed McIntosh – drums (1–3, 5, 7, 9, 10)
- Jennifer McCullagh – strings (4)

== Charts ==
Weekly chart performance for Who You Are
| Chart (2026) | Peak position |
|---|---|
| Australian Albums (ARIA) | 22 |
