= Eva Sandoval =

Spanish musicologist, radio presenter, and music educator (born 1982)

- Born: Eva Sandoval Díez; 1982 (age 43–44); León, Spain
- Education: University of Salamanca (BA in Environmental science, 2005); University of Salamanca (Superior degree in Musicology, 2005); Complutense University of Madrid (Advanced Studies in Musicology, 2011)
- Occupations: Musicologist; Radio presenter; Music educator
- Spouse: Nacho de Paz
- Children: 1

Eva Sandoval Díez (born 1982) is a Spanish musicologist, radio presenter, and music educator. She has been the director of Radio Clásica, the classical music station of Radio Nacional de España, since 2025, having worked at the station since 2008.

== Early life and education ==
In 2000, she obtained her intermediate degree in Piano from the Professional Conservatory of León. She pursued higher education at the University of Salamanca, where she completed two degrees in 2005: a Superior degree in Musicology from the Superior Conservatory of Music of Salamanca and a bachelor's degree in Environmental science.

In 2006, Sandoval moved to Madrid to pursue Advanced Studies in the Department of Musicology at the Complutense University of Madrid, completing her diploma in 2011.

== Career ==
=== Early career and cataloguing work (2006–2008) ===
While pursuing her advanced studies, Sandoval worked from 2006 to 2008 as a cataloguer of manuscript musical collections at the Royal Palace of Madrid library for Patrimonio Nacional (National Heritage).

=== Radio career (2008–2025) ===
In 2008, Sandoval joined Radio Clásica, the classical music station of Radio Nacional de España (RNE). Over her tenure, she has presented and directed or co-directed several programs, including Té para tres (Tea for Three), Café Zimmermann, Grandes Ciclos (Great Cycles), Música viva (Living Music), Estudio 206 (Studio 206), and El café de Mimí (Mimí's Café).

She has also collaborated on various sections about classical music in general programming on Radio Nacional and Radio 5. Currently, she directs and presents the afternoon magazine El café de Mimí on Radio Clásica, broadcast Monday through Friday from 3 to 4 PM.

One of her notable programs, Música viva, had a specific musicological function, featuring weekly hour-long interviews with contemporary composers. Sandoval designed these interviews to serve as primary sources for future musicological research, with the podcasts intended to preserve the composers' own words for scholarly use after their deaths.

=== Television work (2009–present) ===
Since 2009, Sandoval has regularly presented Los conciertos de La 2 (The Concerts of La 2) on Televisión Española (TVE), a program that broadcasts classical music concerts and performances.

=== Academic and institutional collaborations ===
She has worked with the Orquesta y Coro Nacionales de España on various educational projects, including presenting "Descubre" concerts and the Focus festival, as well as creating educational videos in the "Bienvenida 2.0" series. She has also been a scriptwriter and presenter for educational concerts for school children and families organized by the Fundación Caja Madrid and the Centro Nacional de Difusión Musical (CNDM).

As a guest lecturer, Sandoval has taught at the Complutense University of Madrid and the University of La Rioja. She has served on juries for the "Premios Ópera XXI" (Opera XXI Awards) of the Association of Theaters, Festivals and Stable Opera Seasons of Spain, and the evaluation committees for the "Becas Leonardo" (Leonardo Scholarships) of the BBVA Foundation.

Sandoval contributes to various music publications including Scherzo, Ritmo, and Excelentia, and provides educational lectures for institutions such as the Fundación La Caixa, ABAO-OLBE, and the Fundación ORCAM. Since 2022, she has served as a patron of the Fundación Cañada Blanch, which promotes education and culture in Valencia.

=== Appointment as Radio Clásica director (2025) ===
In February 2025, Sandoval was appointed director of Radio Clásica, marking the culmination of her 17-year career at the station. Her appointment was recognized within the classical music community, and under her direction, Radio Clásica received the Prize for Dissemination/Divulgation of Contemporary Music 2025 from the AMCC (Association of Contemporary Music Composers) in July 2025.

== Personal life ==
Sandoval is married to composer and conductor Nacho de Paz, and they have one daughter.
