= Marcus Corowa =

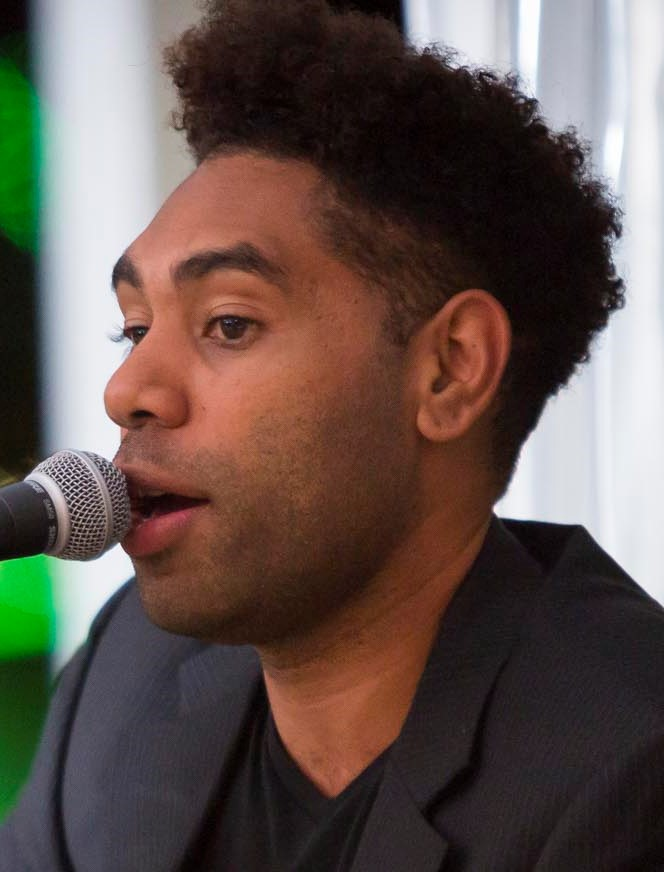
- Corowa in 2016

Background information
- Genre: blues/soul/jazz
- Instruments: Vocals, Guitar

Marcus Corowa is an Indigenous Australian singer/songwriter from Bowen, Queensland. Based in Sydney, Corowa performs blues, jazz, and soul music

Corowa won a Deadly in 2012 for Most Promising New Talent in Music.

On 15 September, 2019 Marcus joined the cast of puppetry show Song for the Mardoowarra during its season at the World Festival of Puppet Theatres in Charleville Mezieres, France.

== Discography ==
- The Greater You
