= The World Today (album) =

Studio album by Troy Cassar-Daley
- Released: 19 March 2021
- Genre: Country
- Length: 62:17
- Label: Sony Music Australia
- Producer: Matt Fell

Troy Cassar-Daley chronology
Christmas for Cowboys (2020)	The World Today (2021)	50 Songs 50 Towns (2022)

The World Today is the thirteenth studio album by Australian country music artist Troy Cassar-Daley. The album was released on 19 March 2021 and peaked at number 3 on the ARIA Charts.

At the 2021 ARIA Music Awards, the album won Best Country Album.

At the 2022 Country Music Awards of Australia, the album won Top Selling Album of the Year.

== Reception ==
Professional ratings
Review scores
Source	Rating
Rolling Stone Australia	4/5 stars

Mallory Arbour from Country Town said "In short, The World Today is a good example of an artist staying true to himself while pushing the boundaries. Rather than a change, the album is a progression for Troy Cassar-Daley that needs repeat listening to be fully appreciated."

Jeff Jenkins from Stack Magazine said "Cassar-Daley is one of our biggest country stars, but he has broadened his sound. The World Today – which features co-writes with Paul Kelly, Don Walker, Shane Howard, Ian Moss and Kevin Bennett – owes as much to the bluesy working-class rock of Springsteen and Chisel as it does traditional country.."

Tyler Jenke from Rolling Stone Australia called the album "one of the most confronting records in his discography, but easily one of the most breathtaking. Equally personal and resounding, Cassar-Daley crafts an almost flawless collection of songs within the space of an hour, touching upon topics which range from the introspective to the quietly exuberant, while providing an overarching feeling of positivity to the darkness."

== Track listing ==
No.	Title	Writer(s)	Length
1.	"Back On Country"	Troy Cassar-Daley, Kevin Bennett	4:30
2.	"My Heart Still Burns for You"	Cassar-Daley, Paul Kelly	3:39
3.	"Parole"	Cassar-Daley	4:01
4.	"Doin' Time"	Cassar-Daley, Greg Storer	3:44
5.	"Heart Like a Small Town"	Cassar-Daley, Bennett	4:32
6.	"Drive in the Dark (Be a Man)"	Cassar-Daley	7:14
7.	"The World Today"	Cassar-Daley	3:55
8.	"I Still Believe"	Cassar-Daley	4:28
9.	"Rain Maker"	Cassar-Daley, Don Walker	4:42
10.	"Too Big for This Town"	Cassar-Daley	4:09
11.	"Broken Hearts Can Fly"	Cassar-Daley, Bennett	4:32
12.	"South" (featuring Ian Moss)	Cassar-Daley, Ian Moss	4:22
13.	"How You Fall"	Cassar-Daley, Kelly	4:32
14.	"I Hear My River"	Cassar-Daley, Shane Howard	3:57
Total length:			62:17

== Charts ==
=== Weekly charts ===
Chart (2021)	Peak position
Australian Albums (ARIA)	3

=== Year-end charts ===
Chart (2021)	Position
Australian Country Albums (ARIA)	14

== Release history ==
Country	Date	Format	Label	Catalogue
Australia	19 March 2021	CD, digital download, LP, streaming	Sony Music Australia	19439857022
