= Jane Saunders =

Australian country music singer

- Genres: Country

Jane Saunders is an Australian country music singer. Her album Stranger to Your Heart was nominated for a 1995 ARIA Award for Best Country Album.

Saunders was a member of the harmony trio Saunders, Kane and Del with Genni Kane (Flying Emus) and Shanley Del. In 1995 they released Tea For Three through ABC Music.

== Discography ==
=== Albums ===
Title	Album details
Stranger to Your Heart	Released: 1994; Label: ABC Records
Poetic Justice	Released: August 1999; Label: ABC Records

== Awards and nominations ==
=== ARIA Music Awards ===
The ARIA Music Awards are a set of annual ceremonies presented by Australian Recording Industry Association (ARIA), which recognise excellence, innovation, and achievement across all genres of the music of Australia. They commenced in 1987.

Year	Nominee / work	Award	Result	Ref.
1995	Stranger to Your Heart	Best Country Album	Nominated	
