= The Great Country Songbook =

Studio album by Adam Harvey and Troy Cassar-Daley
- Released: 14 June 2013
- Genre: Country
- Length: 67:57
- Label: Sony Music Australia

Adam Harvey albums chronology
Falling into Place (2011)	The Great Country Songbook (2013)	Family Life (2014)

Troy Cassar-Daley chronology
Home (2012)	The Great Country Songbook (2013)	Freedom Ride (2015)

The Great Country Songbook is a studio album by Australian country music singers Adam Harvey and Troy Cassar-Daley, released in June 2013. The album debuted at number 2 on the ARIA Charts, becoming the career highest charting album for both artists.

At the ARIA Music Awards of 2013, the album was nominated for Best Country Album.

The album was nominated for a number of awards at the 2014 Country Music Awards of Australia, but Cassar-Daley and Harvey withdrew their nominations after fellow artist John Williamson said the album was too "American" to be considered for an award. In a statement, the duo said "The conversations and debates about the album over the past few days has fragmented an already fragile music community. We are very proud of the achievements of the project, however wish to not have the album as part of the awards. We are just sad for country music that this has all happened. The last thing we wanted to do was cause any controversy. It was just two mates paying tribute to our musical heroes."

== Track listing ==
1. "Good Hearted Woman" – 4:44
2. "Mama's Don't Let Your Babies Grow Up to Be Cowboys" – 4:00
3. "Crystal Chandeliers" – 2:56
4. "He Stopped Loving Her Today" – 3:21
5. "Lights On the Hill" – 3:12
6. "For the Good Times" – 3:50
7. "Coward of the County" – 4:26
8. "Luckenbach, Texas (Back to the Basics of Love)" – 3:35
9. "Indian Pacific" – 3:02
10. "Rhinestone Cowboy" – 3:17
11. "Mama Tried" – 2:17
12. "Behind Closed Doors" – 2:56
13. "I Walk the Line" – 2:25
14. "Hey Good Lookin'" – 3:00
15. "Old Dogs, Children and Watermelon Wine" – 4:13
16. "Oh Lonesome Me" – 3:09
17. "You're My Best Friend" – 3:24
18. "Seven Spanish Angels" – 3:17
19. "That's the Way Love Goes" – 3:10
20. "Medley" ("Thank God I'm a Country Boy"/"Before the Next Teardrop Falls"/"On the Road Again") – 3:36

== Charts ==
=== Weekly charts ===
Chart (2013/14)	Peak position
Australian Albums (ARIA)	2

=== Year-end charts ===
Chart (2013)	Position
ARIA Albums Chart	35
ARIA Country Albums Chart	2
Chart (2014)	Position
ARIA Country Albums Chart	6
Chart (2015)	Position
ARIA Country Albums Chart	44
Chart (2017)	Position
ARIA Country Albums Chart	45

== Certifications ==
Region	Certification	Certified units/sales
Australia (ARIA)	Platinum	70,000^{^}
^{^} Shipments figures based on certification alone.

== Release history ==
Region	Date	Format	Label	Catalogue
Australia	14 June 2013	CD; digital download	Sony Music Australia	88765434052

== See also ==
- The Great Country Songbook Volume 2
