= Adam Harvey =

Australian country music singer (born 1974)

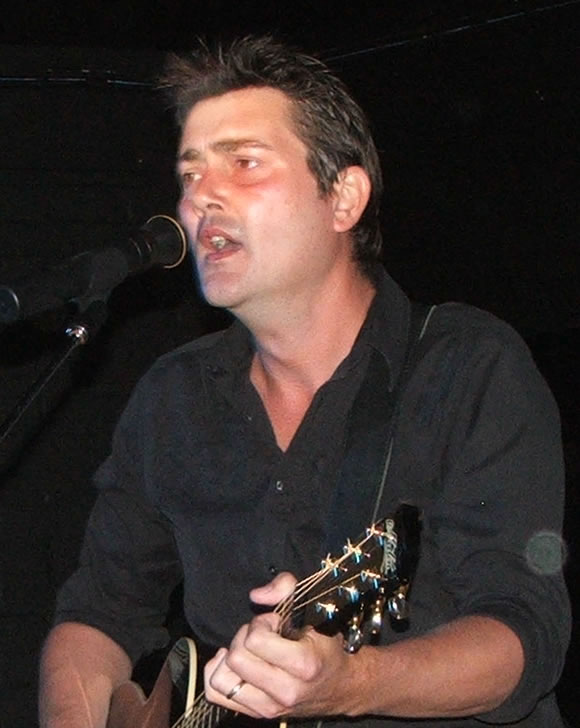

Background information
- Born: 21 December 1974 (age 51); Geelong, Victoria, Australia
- Genre: Country
- Occupations: Singer, songwriter
- Years active: 1984–present
- Labels: Open Road, Universal, ABC Music, Sony Music
- Website: adamharvey.com.au

Adam Harvey (born 21 December 1974) is an Australian country music singer. Harvey has sold over half a million records, has been nominated five times for an ARIA Music Award and has won nine golden guitars at the Country Music Awards of Australia.

== Biography ==
Harvey got his start musically learning country classics on the guitar as a small boy. His first gig came at the age of ten, and by his school years he was performing rock covers at a club when he was discovered and went off on tour as support for Tania Kernaghan. In 1998 Harvey won his first Country Music (CMAA) Award for 'Vocal Collaboration of the Year' with Tanya Self for "Drive Away". In 2001 he won another CMAA Award for 'Vocal Collaboration of the Year' this time with Beccy Cole, Darren Coggan and Felicity, for "Do I Ever Cross Your Mind".

In 2002, Harvey won two CMAA Awards; 'Album of the Year' and 'Male Vocalist of the Year' for Workin' Overtime. Workin' Overtime was nominated for ARIA Award for Best Country Album at the 2002 ARIA Awards.

In 2004, Harvey won a second CMAA Award for 'Male Vocalist of the Year' that year. In 2005 he received his third ARIA award nomination for Best Country Album Can't Settle for Less. In 2008, he won Album of the Year I'm Doin' Alright.

In 2009, he sang the Australian national anthem before the Australia vs New Zealand rugby league test match.

Harvey has been nominated for a CMAA Award in 2010 for Collaboration of the Year with John Williamson for "King of the Road".

External videos
- Official Music Video Stuck in the Middle

In 2013, Harvey collaborated with Troy Cassar-Daley to record The Great Country Songbook, which debuted at number 2 on the ARIA Charts.

== Discography ==
=== Studio albums ===
Title	Details	Peak positions	Certifications (sales thresholds)
Title	Details	AUS	Certifications (sales thresholds)
Adam Harvey	Release date: 1994; Label: Formats: CD, Cassette	—	
Second Time Around	Release date: 1995; Label: Formats: CD, Cassette	—	
Sugar Talk	Release date: 30 August 1999; Label: ABC Music; Formats: CD, Cassette	—	
Workin' Overtime	Release date: 13 August 2001; Label: Open Road Records; Formats: CD, Cassette	48	ARIA: Gold
Cowboy Dreams	Release date: 28 April 2003; Label: ABC Music (1778679); Formats: CD, Cassette	52	ARIA: Gold
Can't Settle for Less	Release date: 17 January 2005; Label: ABC Music (14160); Formats: CD, Cassette	20	
I'm Doin' Alright	Release date: 22 September 2007; Label: Sony Music Australia (88697160032); Formats: CD, DD	38	
Both Sides Now	Release date: 9 October 2009; Label: Sony Music Australia (88697583672); Formats: CD, DD	19	ARIA: Gold
Falling into Place	Release date: 8 July 2011; Label: Sony Music Australia (88697918332); Formats: CD, DD	10	
The Great Country Songbook (with Troy Cassar-Daley)	Release date: 14 June 2013; Label: Sony Music Australia (88765434052); Formats: CD, DD	2	ARIA: Platinum
Family Life	Release date: 22 August 2014; Label: Sony Music Australia (88765434052); Formats: CD, DD	10	
Harvey's Bar... The Backyard Sessions	Release date: 20 November 2015; Label: Sony Music Australia; Formats: CD, DD	17	
The Great Country Songbook Volume 2 (with Beccy Cole)	Release date: 28 April 2017; Label: Sony Music Australia (88985410882); Formats: CD, DD, streaming	6	
The Nashville Tapes	Release date: 27 July 2018; Label: Sony Music Australia; Formats: CD, DD, streaming	9	
Songs from Highway One	Release date: 19 February 2021; Label: Sony Music Australia; Formats: CD, DD, streaming	10	
The Great Country Songbook Volume III (with Beccy Cole)	Release date: 9 September 2022; Label: Sony Music Australia (19658756162); Formats: CD, DD, streaming	36	
Let the Song Take You Home	Release date: 1 November 2024; Label: Sony Music Australia; Formats: CD, DD, streaming	61	

=== Compilation albums ===
Title	Details	Peak positions
Title	Details	AUS
Best So Far	Release date: 20 August 2010; Label: Sony Music Australia; Formats: CD, DD	41

=== Video albums ===
Title	Details	Certifications
Best So Far	Release date: 2010; Label: Sony Music Australia; Formats: DVD	ARIA: Gold

== Awards and nominations ==
=== ARIA Awards ===
Harvey had been nominated for 5 awards at the ARIA Music Awards

Year	Nominee / work	Award	Result
2002	Workin' Overtime	Best Country Album	Nominated
2003	Cowboy Dreams	Best Country Album	Nominated
2005	Can't Settle for Less	Best Country Album	Nominated
2010	Both Sides Now	Best Country Album	Nominated
2013	The Great Country Songbook (with Troy Cassar-Daley)	Best Country Album	Nominated

=== CMA Awards ===
The Country Music Awards of Australia is an annual awards night held in January during the Tamworth Country Music Festival, celebrating recording excellence in the Australian country music industry. Harvey has won nine awards.

Year	Nominee / work	Award	Result (wins only)
1998	"Drive Away" (with Tanya Self)	Vocal Collaboration of the Year	Won
2001	"Do I Ever Cross Your Mind" (with Beccy Cole, Darren Coggan and Felicity)	Vocal Collaboration of the Year	Won
2002	Workin' Overtime	Album of the Year	Won
2002	"Shake of a Hand"	Male Vocalist of the Year	Won
2004	"Call It Love"	Male Vocalist of the Year	Won
2005	"That's What You Call a Friend"	Male Vocalist of the Year	Won
2008	I'm Doin' Alright	Album of the Year	Won
2012	Falling Into Place	Album of the Year	Won
2022	Songs from Highway One	Traditional Country Album of the Year	Won
