= Rachael Fahim =

Australian singer songwriter

- Genre: Country
- Occupations: Singer; songwriter
- Instrument: Vocals
- Years active: 2015–present
- Labels: Island, UMA (2024-present)
- Website: www.rachaelfahim.com

Rachael Fahim is an Australian country singer and songwriter from Cherrybrook, New South Wales. At the 2017 Country Music Awards of Australia, Fahim won the Toyota Star Maker Award. She has performed at SXSW (USA) and CMC Rocks. She has supported Dean Lewis and Pete Murray and Missy Higgins on Australian tours. At the APRA Music Awards of 2026, she won Most Performed Country Work for "Who You Are".

Fahim released her debut studio album Who You Are on 1 May 2026, which debuted at 22 on the ARIA Albums Charts.

== Early life ==
Rachael is the eldest of three children. She began busking in Sydney at the age of 10. In 2014, Fahim made the finals of the Hills Got Talent quest.

== Career ==
=== 2015-present ===
In September 2015, Fahim released her debut single "Say It", which featured Andrew Morley as the love interest. In 2016, Fahim released "Rope" before her debut EP in April 2017.

In 2019, Fahim released her second EP Iconic, which featured the singles "Brake Lights", "Even if I Wanted To" featuring Brad Cox and "What I Don't Know".

In 2024, Fahim signed with Island Records Australia and released "Dance Around It".

In January 2026, Fahim announced the release of her debut studio album Who You Are. The album was written over several years in Nashville, Los Angeles and Sydney and features singles "Dance Around It", "Good Luck", "Who You Are", "Too Damn Hot", "Deep End" and "Never Coming Back".

== Discography ==
=== Studio albums ===
Title	Details	Peak chart positions
Title	Details	AUS
Who You Are	Released: 1 May 2026; Label: Island, UMA (5724403); Formats: CD, digital download	22

=== Extended plays ===
List of EPs, with selected details
Title	Details
Rachael Fahim	Released: April 2017; Label: Rachael Fahim; Format: digital download
Iconic	Released: September 2019; Label: Top Dog; Format: digital download
Acoustic Collection	Released: 7 August 2026; Label: Island, Universal; Format: digital download

== Awards and nominations ==
=== APRA Music Awards ===
The APRA Music Awards were established by Australasian Performing Right Association (APRA) in 1982 to honour the achievements of songwriters and music composers, and to recognise their song writing skills, sales and airplay performance, by its members annually.

Year	Nominee / work	Award	Result	Ref.
2026	"Who You Are" (Rachael Fahim / Shawn Mayer / Liam Quinn / Vlado Saric / Keenan Te)	Most Performed Country Work	Won	

=== ARIA Music Awards ===
The ARIA Music Awards is an annual awards ceremony that recognises excellence, innovation, and achievement across all genres of Australian music.

Year	Nominee / work	Award	Result	Ref.
2026	Who You Are	Best Country Album	Won	
2026	Who You Are	Michael Gudinski Breakthrough Artist	Nominated	

=== Country Music Awards (CMAA) ===
The Country Music Awards of Australia (CMAA) (also known as the Golden Guitar Awards) is an annual awards night held in January during the Tamworth Country Music Festival, celebrating recording excellence in the Australian country music industry. They have been held annually since 1973.

Year	Nominee / work	Award	Result(wins only)	Ref.
2017	Rachael Fahim	Toyota Star Maker Award	Won	
