= Tea for Two =

Tea for Two may refer to:

- "Tea for Two" (song), a 1924 popular song by Vincent Youmans and Irving Caesar
- Tea for Two (album) (1950), a Doris Day album
- Tea for Two (film) (1950), a movie starring Doris Day
- Tea for Two (TV series), Australian television series
- Tahiti Trot, Op. 16, Dmitri Shostakovich's 1927 orchestration of "Tea for Two"

== See also ==
- Tee for Two (1945), a 1945 Tom and Jerry cartoon
