= Beyond the Dancing =

Studio album by Troy Cassar-Daley
- Released: January 1995
- Genre: Country
- Label: Columbia

Troy Cassar-Daley chronology
| Beyond the Dancing (1995) | True Believer (1997) |

Beyond the Dancing is the debut studio album by Australian country singer Troy Cassar-Daley. The album was released in January 1995.

At the ARIA Music Awards of 1995 the album won Best Country Album. At the 1996 Country Music Awards of Australia, Cassar-Daley won Best Male Vocalist for his track "End of the Road".

== Track listing ==
| No. | Title | Length |
|---|---|---|
| 1. | "My Home Town" | 3:18 |
| 2. | "Dream Out Loud" | 3:17 |
| 3. | "End of the Road" | 4:10 |
| 4. | "Working in Blues" | 4:00 |
| 5. | "Beyond the Dancing" | 3:37 |
| 6. | "You Plant Your Fields" | 3:38 |
| 7. | "Texas Swing" | 2:43 |
| 8. | "Bitter Tears" | 3:27 |
| 9. | "Six Stringer" | 4:16 |
| 10. | "Send Me Down Your Love" | 3:42 |
| 11. | "Greater Times" | 3:09 |
| 12. | "No Regrets" (album version) | 4:02 |
| 13. | "Beyond the Dancing" (reprise) | 2:12 |

== Release history ==
| Country | Date | Format | Label | Catalogue |
|---|---|---|---|---|
| Australia | January 1995 | CD, Cassette | Columbia | 478211 2 |
