= I Love This Place =

Studio album by Troy Cassar-Daley
- Released: 17 April 2009
- Genre: Country
- Length: 45:29
- Label: Liberation Music
- Producer: Rod McCormack, Troy Cassar-Daley

Troy Cassar-Daley chronology
Born to Survive (2007)	I Love This Place (2009)	Troy Cassar-Daley Live (2010)

I Love This Place is the seventh studio album by Australian country music artist Troy Cassar-Daley. The album was released in April 2009 and peaked at number 34 on the ARIA Charts.

At the ARIA Music Awards of 2009, it won the ARIA Award for Best Country Album; this is the fourth time Cassar-Daley has won this award. At the 2010 Country Music Awards of Australia in Tamworth, Cassar-Daley won seven Gold Guitars, including Male Vocalist of the Year and Album of the Year.

== Track listing ==
No.	Title	Writer(s)	Length
1.	"Sing About This Country"	Colin Buchanan, Troy Cassar-Daley	3:42
2.	"Chasin' Rodeo"	Cassar-Daley	3:16
3.	"Big, Big Love"	Cassar-Daley	3:14
4.	"I Love This Place"	Cassar-Daley	3:33
5.	"Down That Road Before"	Cassar-Daley	4:10
6.	"Ain't Gonna Change for You" (featuring The McClymonts)	Cassar-Daley, Brooke McClymont, Samantha McClymont	3:38
7.	"This Day Is Mine"	Cassar-Daley	3:19
8.	"This Town Is Me"	Cassar-Daley	4:25
9.	"Country Boy (Lost in the City)"	Cassar-Daley	3:06
10.	"Bean Pickin' Blues"	Cassar-Daley	3:09
11.	"Fred Brophy's in Town"	Cassar-Daley	2:19
12.	"I Love You"	Cassar-Daley	4:24
13.	"Won't Let the Sun (Go Down On This Love)"	Cassar-Daley, Mark Sholtez	3:15

== Charts ==
=== Weekly charts ===
Chart (2009)	Peak position
Australian Albums (ARIA)	34

=== Year-end charts ===
Chart (2009)	Position
ARIA Country Albums Chart	15

== Release history ==
Country	Date	Format	Label	Catalogue
Australia	17 April 2009	CD, LP	Liberation Records	LMCD0046/LMLP0046
