= Home (Troy Cassar-Daley album) =

Studio album by Troy Cassar-Daley
- Released: 2 March 2012
- Genre: Country
- Length: 47:30
- Label: Liberation Music
- Producer: Troy Cassar-Daley

Troy Cassar-Daley chronology
Greatest Hits Live (2011)	Home (2012)	The Great Country Songbook (2013)

Home is the eighth studio album by Australian country music artist Troy Cassar-Daley. The album was released in March 2012 and peaked at number 9 on the ARIA Charts, becoming Cassar-Daley's first top ten album.

The album reflects Cassar-Daley's connection to country and his family. Cassar-Daley was inspired to wear his heart on his sleeve after the floods of January 2011 devastated his farm property in Queensland.

At the ARIA Music Awards of 2012, the album was nominated for the ARIA Award for Best Country Album. At the 2013 Country Music Awards of Australia in Tamworth the album won Album of the Year.

== Track listing ==
No.	Title	Length
1.	"Country Is"	3:49
2.	"Live and Learn"	3:22
3.	"Good Things in Life"	3:45
4.	"Play"	3:50
5.	"Home"	4:09
6.	"A Simple Song"	2:32
7.	"The River Runs"	3:40
8.	"Tall Dark Ringer"	3:44
9.	"Good Man"	4:12
10.	"Beautiful Life"	3:31
11.	"This Country's in My Soul"	3:54
12.	"Thinkin' About Drinkin'"	4:02
13.	"Good Times Starting Over"	3:34

Bonus DVD
No.	Title	Length
1.	"Documentary: The Making of Home"
2.	"Troy Talks About the Songs on Home"
3.	"Country Is" (video clip)

== Charts ==
=== Weekly charts ===
Chart (2012)	Peak position
Australian Albums (ARIA)	9

=== Year-end charts ===
Chart (2012)	Position
ARIA Country Albums Chart	17

== Release history ==
Country	Date	Format	Label	Catalogue
Australia	2 March 2012	CD/DVD, digital download	Liberation Records	LMCD0162
