= Shanley Del =

- Born: Shanley Del Morris; 9 November 1962 (age 63); Hamilton, New Zealand
- Occupation: Musician
- Instrument: Vocals
- Years active: 1977–present

Shanley Del Morris (born 9 November 1962), who performs as Shanley Del, is a New Zealand-born Australian-based country and pop music singer-songwriter. Her second album, My Own Sweet Time (September 1997), won the ARIA Award for Best Country Album in 1998.

== Biography ==
Shanley Del Morris was born in Hamilton, New Zealand in 1962, and grew up as the seventh of nine children with three brothers (Alister, Rhys and Tam) and four sisters (Bronte, Maxine, Joanne and Jenny).

In 1991 Del moved to Sydney to work as a backing singer for her elder sister, Jenny, who had relocated there ten years earlier. On the strength of her demo tape, "Together Alone", she was signed with rooArt records in 1992 as a solo artist. Her first EP, Funnel of Love, was issued in that year. The title track, "Funnel of Love", is a cover version of Wanda Jackson's 1961 single.

Her debut solo album, What's a Heartache For?, appeared in 1994, which was recorded in Nashville with Canadian producer, Ralph Murphy. Session musicians included David Briggs on piano, Danny Parks on guitar, and Milton Sledge on drums. In the following year she teamed with fellow country singers, Jane Saunders and Genni Kane to form a trio, Saunders, Kane & Del, and record an album, Tea for Three (1995). They performed at special events and on TV but did not tour. During the trio's recording sessions they used James Gillard (of the Flood) on double bass guitar; Del and Gillard married in 1998.

Her second album, My Own Sweet Time, followed in September 1997 and was also recorded in Nashville. Session musicians included members of the Dead Reckoners: Kieran Kane, Harry Stinson and Kevin Welch. She won Best Country Album at the ARIA Music Awards of 1998. Del's third album, The Other Side (2001), appeared under the name Shanley and showed a more pop-orientated sound, which was produced by Matt Fell. In January 2019 Shanley and Gillard released an extended play, Shanley Del and James Gillard, which they co-produced.

== Discography ==
=== Studio albums ===
List of studio albums, with selected chart positions
Title	Album details	Peak chart positions
Title	Album details	AUS
What's a Heartache For?	Released: 1994; Label: rooArt (74321674182); Formats: CD	-
My Own Sweet Time	Released: September 1997; Label: rooArt/BMG (74321504272); Formats: CD	88
The Other Side	Released: 2001; Label: rooArt/BMG (74321848402); Formats: CD	-

=== Extended plays ===
List of extended plays, with selected details
Title	EP details
Funnel of Love	Released: 1992; Formats: CD
Red Roses	Released: 1993; Formats: CD
Shanley Del and James Gillard	Released: 28 January 2019; Label: Delicious Music; Formats: Digital download

== Awards ==
=== ARIA Music Awards ===
The ARIA Music Awards are a set of annual ceremonies presented by Australian Recording Industry Association (ARIA), which recognise excellence, innovation, and achievement across all genres of the music of Australia. They commenced in 1987.

Year	Nominated works	Award	Result	Ref
1998	My Own Sweet Time	Best Country Album	Won	
