= True Believer (Troy Cassar-Daley album) =

Studio album by Troy Cassar-Daley
- Released: January 1997
- Genre: Country
- Label: Columbia

Troy Cassar-Daley chronology
Beyond the Dancing (1995)	True Believer (1997)	Big River (1999)

True Believer is the second studio album by Australian country music artist Troy Cassar-Daley. The album was released in January 1997 and peaked at number 53 on the ARIA Charts. The album came with a 4-track limited edition second disc titled the Tamworth Festival Edition.

At the 1998 Country Music Awards in Tamworth, Cassar-Daley won three Gold Guitars – Best Male Vocal and Best Video for his single "Little Things" while the album won Album of the Year.

At the ARIA Music Awards of 1998, the album was nominated for Best Country Album.

== Track listing ==
No.	Title	Length
1.	"Good Woman's Love"	2:37
2.	"She Wants me"	2:23
3.	"Little Things"	3:29
4.	"I Can Get Used to That"	2:59
5.	"True Believer"	2:54
6.	"Ladies in My Life"	3:46
7.	"Sweet Maryanne"	3:08
8.	"You Will Believe in Me"	3:43
9.	"The Wind Blows Over (The Lonely of Heart)"	4:11
10.	"Lay Down And Dance"	3:19
11.	"Bar Room Roses"	3:40
12.	"Good Time Friday Night"	2:22
13.	"Back Blocks of Home / Ain't No Room for Love"	7:45

Tamworth Festival Edition
No.	Title	Writer(s)	Length
1.	"The Biggest Disappointment" (with Slim Dusty)	Joy McKean
2.	"You Cant Take the Country Out of the Boy"
3.	"You'll Never Know Til You Try"
4.	"Back Home Again"

== Charts ==
Chart (1997/98)	Peak position
Australian Albums (ARIA)	53

== Certifications ==
Region	Certification	Certified units/sales
Australia (ARIA)	Gold	35,000^{^}
^{^} Shipments figures based on certification alone.

== Release history ==
Country	Date	Format	Label	Catalogue
Australia	January 1997	CD, Cassette	Columbia	486872
