= Born to Survive =

Greatest hits album by Troy Cassar-Daley
- Released: July 2007
- Genre: Country
- Label: EMI Music

Troy Cassar-Daley chronology
Almost Home (2006)	Born to Survive (2007)	I Love This Place (2009)

Born to Survive (subtitled The Best Of) is the second compilation and first greatest hits album by Australian country musician Troy Cassar-Daley. The album includes tracks from all six of Cassar-Daley's albums to date; plus two new songs including "Everything's Going to Be Alright" which was co-written with Don Walker. Born to Survive was released in July 2007 and peaked at number 18 on the ARIA Charts. The album was certified gold in 2008.

== Track listing ==
No.	Title	Writer(s)	Length
1.	"Born to Survive"	Troy Cassar-Daley	4:25
2.	"Lonesome But Free"	Cassar-Daley	4:10
3.	"They Don't Make 'Em Like That Anymore"	Cassar-Daley	3:57
4.	"Everything's Going to Be Alright" (featuring My Friends Choir)	Cassar-Daley, Don Walker	3:49
5.	"True Believer"	Cassar-Daley	2:52
6.	"Going Back Home"	Cassar-Daley	3:23
7.	"I Wish I Was a Train" (featuring Paul Kelly)	Cassar-Daley	3:16
8.	"Bird on a Wire" (featuring Jimmy Barnes and Bella)	Leonard Cohen	4:26
9.	"The Biggest Disappointment" (featuring Slim Dusty)		3:10
10.	"Little Thing"		3:33
11.	"River Boy"		2:51
12.	"Last Mile Home"		3:22
13.	"Bar Room Roses"		3:39
14.	"Ladies in My Life"		3:44
15.	"Make the Most (Of Everyday with You)"		3:57
16.	"Dream out Loud"		3:17
17.	"Ramblin' Man"		3:46
18.	"I Wanna Go Back"	Cassar-Daley, Angela Kaset	3:48
19.	"Trains"		3:50
20.	"Walking Away"		4:13

== Charts ==
Chart (2007)	Peak position
Australian Albums (ARIA)	18

== Certifications ==
Region	Certification	Certified units/sales
Australia (ARIA)	Gold	35,000^{^}
^{^} Shipments figures based on certification alone.

== Release history ==
Country	Date	Format	Label	Catalogue
Australia	July 2007	CD	EMI Music	509924250122
