= Brighter Day (album) =

Studio album by Troy Cassar-Daley
- Released: 10 October 2005
- Recorded: The Beach House, The Music Cellar
- Genre: country
- Length: 53:08
- Label: Essence Records, EMI Music
- Producer: Nash Chambers

Troy Cassar-Daley chronology
Borrowed & Blue (2004)	Brighter Day (2005)	Almost Home (2006)

Brighter Day is the sixth studio album by Australian country musician Troy Cassar-Daley, released on 10 October 2005 and peaked at number 46 on the ARIA Charts.

At the ARIA Music Awards of 2006, the album won the ARIA Award for Best Country Album, this was Cassar-Daley's third ARIA award.

== Track listing ==
No.	Title	Length
1.	"Going Back Home"	3:24
2.	"Lonesome But Free"	4:11
3.	"Away from Here"	4:31
4.	"Time Is a Friend Of Mine"	2:54
5.	"Fisherman"	4:38
6.	"Getaway Car"	5:06
7.	"My Town"	4:09
8.	"Wanted Man"	5:44
9.	"Long As I Don't See You"	3:54
10.	"Family Farm"	4:21
11.	"Walking Away"	4:11
12.	"River Town"	2:57
13.	"Yellow Belly"	3:15

Bonus disc
No.	Title	Writer(s)	Length
1.	"Bird On a Wire" (featuring Jimmy Barnes and Bella)	Leonard Cohen	4:28
2.	"Someday"	Steve Earle	3:29
3.	"Long Black Veil"	Marijohn Wilkin, Danny Dill	3:25
4.	"'Til I Gain Control Again" (Live at the Queenscliff Music Festival - November 2003)	Rodney Crowell	3:56
5.	"Make the Most (Of Every Day With You)" (Live at the Queenscliff Music Festival - November 2003)	Cassar-Daley	3:37

== Charts ==
=== Weekly charts ===
Chart (2005)	Peak position
Australian Albums (ARIA)	46

=== Year-end charts ===
Chart (2006)	Position
ARIA Country Albums Chart	21

== Release history ==
Country	Date	Format	Label	Catalogue
Australia	10 October 2005	CD, Cassette	Essence Records, EMI Music	3427112
