= Things I Carry Around =

Studio album by Troy Cassar-Daley
- Released: 26 August 2016
- Genre: Country
- Length: 58:43
- Label: Liberation Music
- Producer: Troy Cassar-Daley

Troy Cassar-Daley chronology
Freedom Ride (2015)	Things I Carry Around (2016)	Lost & Found (2018)

Things I Carry Around is the eleventh studio album by Australian country music artist Troy Cassar-Daley. The album was released 26 August 2016 and peaked at number 5 on the ARIA Charts.

Things I Carry Around is also the title of Cassar-Daley's autobiography. Cassar-Daley said “After going over so much of my life for the book, it just started to come out of me; the album almost wrote itself”

At the 2017 Country Music Awards of Australia the album won Album of the Year. At the National Indigenous Music Awards of 2017, the album won Album of the Year.

== Reception ==
Working Bull said "It is very much a Troy Cassar-Daley sounding album, staying true to his sounds and his style of music we have all come to love. This album is composed of songs about reflection; some are deep and meaningful, there are also songs that are great easy listening around a fire but they all seem honest and are strong story telling in nature. This album paints a picture of Troy's life from childhood to young adult."

== Track listing ==
No.	Title	Writer(s)	Length
1.	"Funny How Things Change"	Troy Cassar-Daley, Colin Buchanan, Don Walker	3:35
2.	"Halfway Creek, Timber Cutting Man"	Cassar-Daley	3:59
3.	"Things I Carry Around"	Cassar-Daley, Don Sampson, Wynn Varble	3:35
4.	"A Cold Walk Home" (prelude)	Cassar-Daley	0:41
5.	"Brighter Day"	Cassar-Daley, Paul Kelly	4:00
6.	"When My Daddy Played"	Cassar-Daley	3:58
7.	"Country Music's Coming To Town"	Cassar-Daley	3:38
8.	"On My Way Back Around"	Cassar-Daley, Walker	3:28
9.	"This River Is My Soul" (prelude)	Cassar-Daley	0:58
10.	"My Gumbaynggirr Skies"	Cassar-Daley	3:44
11.	"Smoked With Willie and Merle"	Cassar-Daley, Kim Richey	2:32
12.	"Salvation" (prelude)	Cassar-Daley	0:10
13.	"Down the Road"	Cassar-Daley, Walker	5:20
14.	"If My Heart Was a Town"	Cassar-Daley, Walker	4:35
15.	"Running"	Cassar-Daley	4:31
16.	"First Night Alone"	Cassar-Daley, Angela Kaset	4:32
17.	"Certified Railway Man"	Cassar-Daley, Buchanan	3:05
18.	"Blue Lights" (poem)	Cassar-Daley, Walker	3:45

== Charts ==
=== Weekly charts ===
Chart (2016)	Peak position
Australian Albums (ARIA)	5

=== Year-end charts ===
Chart (2016)	Position
ARIA Country Albums Chart	8
ARIA Australian Artist Albums Chart	49
Chart (2017)	Position
ARIA Country Albums Chart	72

== Release history ==
Country	Date	Format	Label	Catalogue
Australia	26 August 2016	CD, digital download	Liberation Records	LMCD0300
