= Borrowed & Blue =

Studio album by Troy Cassar-Daley
- Released: 19 April 2004
- Recorded: The Beach House, The Music Cellar, The Shed
- Genre: country
- Length: 41:57
- Label: Essence Records, EMI Music
- Producer: Nash Chambers

Troy Cassar-Daley chronology
Long Way Home (2002)	Borrowed & Blue (2004)	Brighter Day (2005)

Borrowed & Blue is the fifth studio album by Australian country musician Troy Cassar-Daley, released on 19 April 2004 and peaked at number 89 on the ARIA Charts. The album is a covers album in which Cassar-Daley acknowledges as songs "he loves and that have influenced his own writing and singing style".

At the ARIA Music Awards of 2004, the album was nominated for the ARIA Award for Best Country Album.

== Reception ==
Professional ratings
Review scores
Source	Rating
Rolling Stone	4/5 stars

Rolling Stone gave the album a positive review saying "While American Country goes down the road of super-slick production and overblown pomp, Australian artists have won hearts by bearing their songs, unadorned and honestly. So when Troy Cassar-Daley covers a set of tunes by his favorite artists, it's on that same honesty that the success of the risky project is riding. Fortunately, Cassar-Daley is shooting straight as ever - his casual charisma takes tracks as disparate as Tom Petty's "Yer So Bad" and Slim Dusty's "Losin' My Blues Tonight" and turns them into his own brand of Australian country music." adding "It's his love of these tunes, and his consistently genuinely delivery of them, that makes this a real album and not just a novelty project."

== Track listing ==
No.	Title	Writer(s)	Length
1.	"Factory Man"	Shane Howard	3:09
2.	"My Old Friend the Blues"	Steve Earle	3:02
3.	"River Boy"	Fred Carter, Jr.	2:51
4.	"Yer So Bad"	Jeff Lynne, Tom Petty	3:06
5.	"Big City" (featuring Dead Ringer Band)	Merle Haggard, Dean Holloway	3:05
6.	"The Dark End of the Street"	Chips Moman, Dan Penn	3:48
7.	"Why Baby Why" (featuring Paul Kelly)	Darrell Edwards, George Jones	2:15
8.	"I Got a Name"	Charles Fox, Norman Gimbel	2:59
9.	"'Til I Gain Control Again"	Rodney Crowell	4:20
10.	"Losin' My Blues Tonight"	Slim Dusty	1:55
11.	"I Still Miss Someone"	Johnny Cash, Roy Cash	3:31
12.	"My Bucket's Got a Hole in It" (featuring Don Walker)	Clarence Williams	2:06
13.	"I'm an Old Old Man Tryin' to Live While I Can"	Lefty Frizzell	2:47
14.	"Still Can't Say Goodbye"		3:03

== Charts ==
Chart (2004)	Peak position
Australian Albums (ARIA)	89

== Release history ==
Country	Date	Format	Label	Catalogue
Australia	19 April 2004	CD, Cassette	Essence Records, EMI Music	5979432
