= Freedom Ride (album) =

Album by Troy Cassar-Daley

Studio album by Troy Cassar-Daley
- Released: 13 March 2015
- Recorded: Loud Recording Studio, Nashville Tennessee
- Genre: Country
- Length: 48:00
- Label: Liberation Music
- Producer: Troy Cassar-Daley

Troy Cassar-Daley chronology
| The Great Country Songbook (2013) | Freedom Ride (2015) | Things I Carry Around (2016) |

Freedom Ride is the tenth studio album by Australian country music artist Troy Cassar-Daley. The album was released in March 2015 and peaked at number 4 on the ARIA Charts.

The album's centrepiece and title track was performed at the 50th anniversary of the 1965 Freedom Ride, which had been led by the political activist Charles Perkins.

Cassar-Daley supported the album with a national tour commencing in Swan Hill on 30 April and concluding in Tweed Heads on 14 November 2015.

At the ARIA Music Awards of 2015, the album was nominated for the ARIA Award for Best Country Album. At the 2016 Country Music Awards of Australia in Tamworth the album won Album of the Year.

== Reception ==
Professional ratings
Review scores
| Source | Rating |
|---|---|
| Guardian Australia | 4/5 stars |
| The Australian | 4/5 stars |

Everett True from Guardian Australia said "Freedom Ride is full of songs about trucking, drinking, women, wide open spaces and red dirt – with the odd tribute to his children thrown in." adding "it's a sprawling, good-natured affair."

Polly Coufos from The Australian said "With a team of co-writers, Cassar-Daley has crafted a dozen tales cut from his life and imagination. From heartfelt songs about his grandfather and daughter to rowdy rockers, he covers all bases." She said the title track was the album's most important song saying "In part a tribute to Charles Perkins, the title track traces a journey by a group of students in 1965 to address the inequality facing our indigenous population. It does not dwell on the detail, rather leaving the focus on its rousing chorus. A song for all Australians, it speaks of our past while filled with hope for our future."

John Nutting said "Freedom Ride is his “career” album. Its credible, sincere, insightful, well produced and delivers its message in a subtle but entertaining way". Daily Telegraph said "Evenly balanced between uplifting celebration of an Australian spirit and the darker human condition, it's a complete record"

== Track listing ==
| No. | Title | Writer(s) | Length |
|---|---|---|---|
| 1. | "Take a Walk in My Country" | Troy Cassar-Daley, Colin Buchanan | 3:49 |
| 2. | "Since You Left This Town" | Cassar-Daley | 5:02 |
| 3. | "Something About Trains" | Cassar-Daley, Peter Denahy | 3:59 |
| 4. | "Tennessee Rain" | Cassar-Daley, Paul Kelly | 4:27 |
| 5. | "Another Australian Day" | Cassar-Daley, Denahy | 4:19 |
| 6. | "Freedom Ride" (featuring Paul Kelly) | Cassar-Daley, Kelly | 3:38 |
| 7. | "This Old Hat" | Cassar-Daley, Denahy | 3:51 |
| 8. | "Two Weeks on, Two Weeks Off" (featuring Jimmy Barnes) | Cassar-Daley | 3:41 |
| 9. | "Drive It" | Cassar-Daley, Buchanan | 3:25 |
| 10. | "Black Mountain" | Cassar-Daley | 5:29 |
| 11. | "This Day" | Cassar-Daley, Kim Richey | 3:24 |
| 12. | "Road Ready" | Cassar-Daley | 2:56 |

== Charts ==
=== Weekly charts ===
| Chart (2015) | Peak position |
|---|---|
| Australian Albums (ARIA) | 4 |

=== Year-end charts ===
| Chart (2015) | Position |
|---|---|
| ARIA Country Albums Chart | 5 |
| ARIA Australian Artist Albums Chart | 50 |
| Chart (2016) | Position |
| ARIA Country Albums Chart | 60 |

== Release history ==
| Country | Date | Format | Label | Catalogue |
|---|---|---|---|---|
| Australia | 13 March 2015 | CD, digital download | Liberation Records | LMCD0251 |
