= Long Way Home (Troy Cassar-Daley album) =

Studio album by Troy Cassar-Daley
- Released: 27 May 2002
- Genre: country
- Label: Essence Records, EMI Music
- Producer: Nash Chambers

Troy Cassar-Daley chronology
Big River (1999)	Long Way Home (2002)	Borrowed & Blue (2004)

Long Way Home is the fourth studio album by Australian country musician Troy Cassar-Daley, released on 27 May 2002 and peaked at number 77 on the ARIA Charts

At the ARIA Music Awards of 2002, the album was nominated for the ARIA Award for Best Country Album.

== Track listing ==
No.	Title	Length
1.	"River Road"	3:03
2.	"Rise & Shine"	2:53
3.	"Born to Survive"	4:29
4.	"Think About You"	2:48
5.	"40 Miles"	4:38
6.	"Long Way Home"	3:20
7.	"My Dreaming Place"	3:11
8.	"Wish I Was a Train"	3:17
9.	"Night Blindness"	4:09
10.	"Sad Goodbye"	3:02
11.	"(Make the Most of) Everyday With You"	3:59
12.	"8 Days (from Sydney)"	4:12
13.	"Everything I Do"	4:58

== Charts ==
Chart (2002)	Peak position
Australian Albums (ARIA)	77

== Certifications ==
Region	Certification	Certified units/sales
Australia (ARIA)	Gold	35,000^{^}
^{^} Shipments figures based on certification alone.

== Release history ==
Country	Date	Format	Label	Catalogue
Australia	27 May 2002	CD, Cassette	Essence Records, EMI Music	5399092
