= Troy Cassar-Daley =

Australian musician

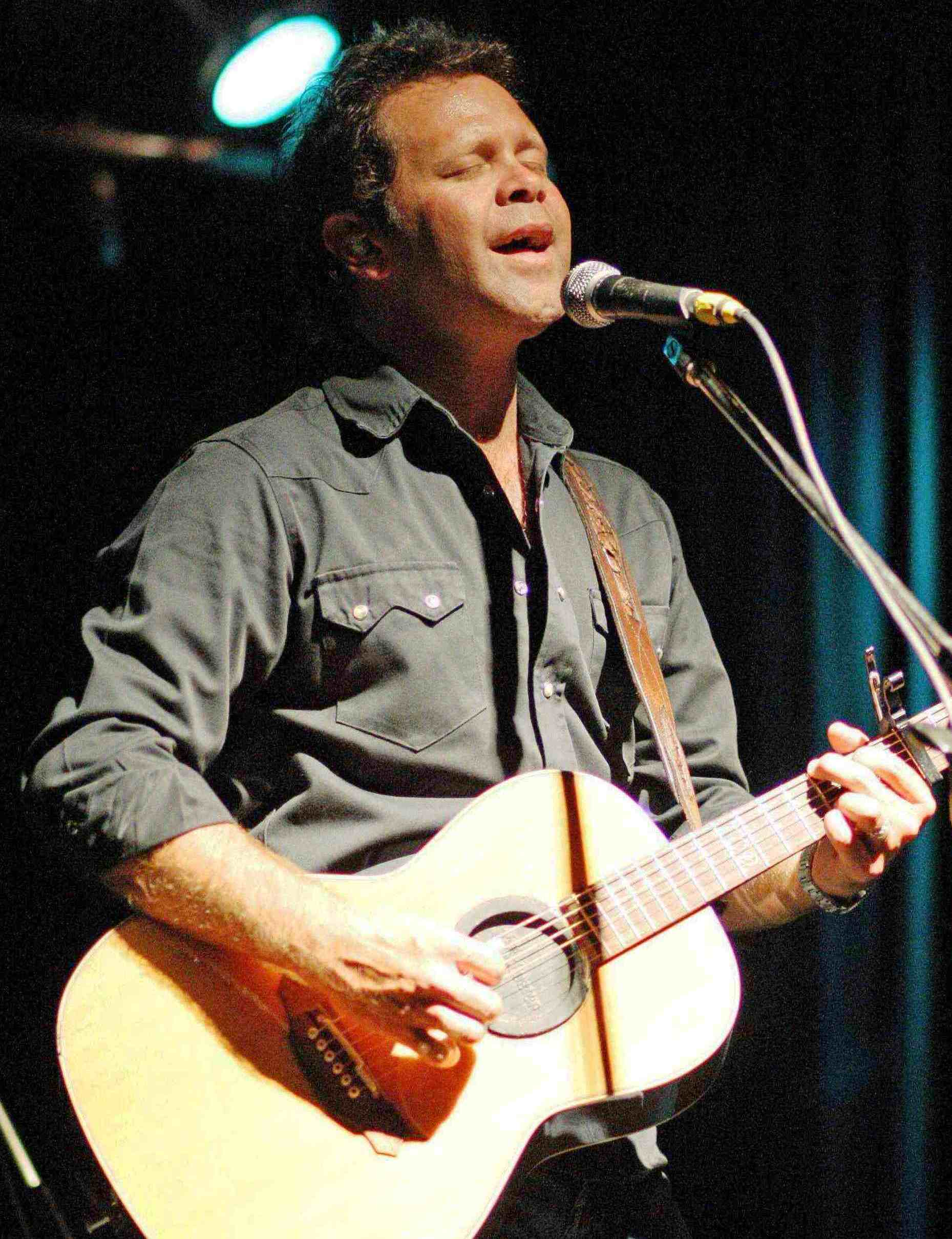

Background information
- Born: 18 May 1969 (age 57); Sydney, New South Wales, Australia
- Genre: Country
- Occupations: Songwriter, singer, author
- Instruments: Vocals, guitar, harmonica
- Years active: 1990–present
- Labels: Sony Music, Liberation Music
- Spouse: Laurel Edwards
- Website: www.troycassardaley.com.au
- Children: 2, including Jem Cassar-Daley

Troy Cassar-Daley (born 18 May 1969) is an Australian country music songwriter and entertainer of Aboriginal heritage. He released his first single, "Dream Out Loud", in 1994, followed by his debut album, Beyond the Dancing, in 1995, and has continued to release music since then, including the platinum-selling The Great Country Songbook (2013) with Adam Harvey. Throughout his career he has received many awards, including ARIA Music Awards, Golden Guitars, Deadly Awards, Country Music Association of Australia Entertainer of the Year awards, and National Indigenous Music Awards.

== Early life and career ==
Troy Cassar-Daley was born on 18 May 1969 in the Sydney suburb of Surry Hills to a Maltese-Australian father and an Aboriginal mother from the Gumbaynggirr and Bundjalung people. At a very young age, he moved with his mother to Grafton in north-eastern New South Wales. At eleven, Troy went to the Tamworth Country Music Festival and returned the next year to busk on the streets.

At 16, he and his band, Little Eagle, were touring the North Coast of New South Wales and he made the top 10 in Tamworth's Toyota Star Maker Quest. He won the 1986 "Search for a Star" competition and then toured with Brian Young for seven months, in which he began to develop his songwriting skills. After returning home he replaced James Blundell as leader of country music band The Blue Heeler Band.

== Solo career ==
By late 1993 Cassar-Daley had enough original songs for a debut EP. The first single "Dream Out Loud" was released on 24 October 1994 by Sony Music and reached number-one on the Australian country music charts. His first album, Beyond the Dancing, was released in January 1995 and won the ARIA Award for Best Country Album at the ARIA Music Awards of 1995. At the 1996 Country Music Awards, in Tamworth, Cassar-Daley won Best Male Vocalist. He also made a cameo appearance in the motion picture Race the Sun in which he performed a song in a bar scene.

In June 1996, Cassar-Daley was part of the Australian Country Music Showcase in Nashville. The Showcase included Lee Kernaghan, Gina Jeffreys and Tommy Emmanuel. As a result, Cassar-Daley returned to the US to record his new album True Believer (1998) with Steve Dorff. His follow-up, Big River (1999), won another best country album ARIA Award at the ARIA Music Awards of 2000. His next three studio albums were Long Way Home (2002), Borrowed & Blue (2004), and Brighter Day (2005), the latter also winning a best country album ARIA Award. His next album, I Love This Place (2009) also won an Aria award for best country album and marked his change of record labels from Sony to Liberation Music.

Cassar-Daley performed the national anthem at the 2003 NRL grand final. He partnered up with Kate Ritchie for the singing competition It Takes Two aired on Seven Network in 2006. In May 2007 he re-appeared on the same show, this time partnered with Krystal Forscutt, a former contestant on Network Ten's Big Brother program. The same year, Cassar-Daley was featured in Wiggles music videos for the songs "Old Dan Tucker" and "Turkey in the Straw". Cassar-Daley with Kasey Chambers and Shane Nicholson played together at the Melbourne Cricket Ground on 14 March 2009 for Sound Relief which was a multi-venue rock music concert in support of relief for the Victorian Bushfire Crisis. The event was held simultaneously with another concert taking place at the Sydney Cricket Ground. All the proceeds from the Melbourne Concert went to the Red Cross Victorian Bushfire Relief Appeal.

Cassar-Daley went on to release the albums Home (2012), The Great Country Songbook with Adam Harvey (2013), and Freedom Ride (2015). In August 2016, Cassar-Daley released his first book, an autobiography of his early life and music career titled Things I Carry Around with an accompanying album of the same title. In 2017 Cassar-Daley was the 50th inductee into the prestigious Australian Roll of Renown. In October 2018, Cassar-Daley released his 42-track double album Greatest Hits, along with a new single called "Wouldn't Change A Thing" on the Bloodlines label, part of Mushroom Group. The extensive album was also released on vinyl.

In June 2020, Cassar-Daley signed a worldwide label deal with Sony Music Entertainment Australia; he had first signed to the label in 1995. He released the albums Christmas for Cowboys in 2020 and The World Today in 2021, which won the best country album award at that year's ARIA Music Awards.

In 2024, he released his next studio album, Between the Fires, touring the country for the first time since 2019 to promote it. He recorded the album at his family home at Halfway Creek in Northern New South Wales, as he was grieving the loss of his mother.

== Personal life ==
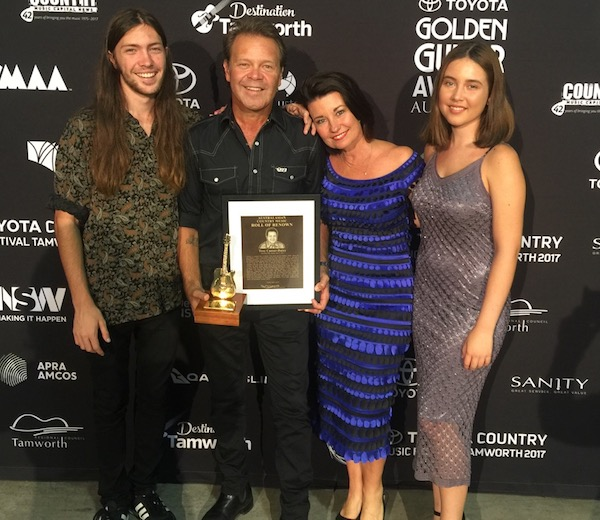
Cassar-Daley with his wife and children

Cassar-Daley is married to radio and television presenter Laurel Edwards with whom he has two children. One of their children is singer-songwriter Jem Cassar-Daley.

In 2020, Cassar-Daley's participation in Australia's Who Do You Think You Are? was broadcast on SBS, where he traced both his ancestral roots on his father's side in Malta, and his mother's Aboriginal Australian ancestry.

== Discography ==
=== Studio albums ===
Title	Details	Peak positions	Certifications (sales thresholds)
Title	Details	AUS	Certifications (sales thresholds)
Beyond the Dancing	Release date: January 1995; Label: Columbia (478211 2); Formats: CD, cassette	—	
True Believer	Release date: January 1997; Label: Columbia (486872 2); Formats: CD, cassette	53	ARIA: Gold
Big River	Release date: August 1999; Label: Columbia (495236 2); Formats: CD, cassette	49	ARIA: Gold
Long Way Home	Release date: 27 May 2002; Label: Essence Records/EMI Music (5399092); Formats: CD, cassette	77	ARIA: Gold
Borrowed & Blue	Release date: 19 April 2004; Label: Essence/EMI Music (5979432); Formats: CD, cassette	89	
Brighter Day	Release date: 10 October 2005; Label: Essence/EMI Music (3427112); Formats: CD, cassette	46	
I Love This Place	Release date: 17 April 2009; Label: Liberation Records (LMCD0046); Formats: CD, cassette, LP	34	
Home	Release date: 2 March 2012; Label: Liberation (LMCD0163); Formats: CD+DVD, digital	9	
The Great Country Songbook (with Adam Harvey)	Release date: 14 June 2013; Label: Sony Music Australia (88765434052); Formats: CD, digital	2	ARIA: Platinum
Freedom Ride	Release date: 13 March 2015; Label: Liberation Records (LMCD0251); Formats: CD, digital	4	
Things I Carry Around	Release date: 26 August 2016; Label: Liberation Records (LMCD0300); Formats: CD, digital	5	
Christmas for Cowboys	Release date: 6 November 2020; Label: Sony Music (19439807412); Formats: CD, digital	13	
The World Today	Release date: 19 March 2021; Label: Sony Music (19439857022); Formats: CD, LP, digital	3	
Between the Fires	Release date: 10 May 2024; Label: Sony Music (19658875352); Formats: CD, 2×LP, digital	2	

=== Live albums ===
Title	Details	Peak positions		Certifications (sales thresholds)
Title	Details	AUS	AUS Top 40 Music DVD	Certifications (sales thresholds)
Troy Cassar-Daley Live	Release date: 22 October 2010; Label: Liberation Music (LMCD0117)/(LIBDVD1111); Formats: CD, DVD, DD	—	20	ARIA: Gold
Greatest Hits Live	Release date: 9 September 2011; Label: Liberation Music (LMCD0150); Formats: CD, DD	—	—N/a	
50 Songs 50 Towns	Released: 12 August 2022; Label: Sony Music Australia (19658722012); Formats: 3×CD, DD	8	—N/a	
Together Alone: Live at the Ulumbarra Theatre (with Ian Moss)	Released: 2 October 2026; Label: Mosstopper / Tarampa; Formats: Digital, CD, 2×LP	49	—N/a	

=== Compilation albums ===
Title	Details	Peak positions	Certifications (sales thresholds)
Title	Details	AUS	Certifications (sales thresholds)
Almost Home	Release date: 23 January 2006; Label: Rajon (CDR0543); Formats: CD, cassette	—	
Born to Survive (The Best of)	Release date: July 2007; Label: EMI Music (5099 2 425012 2); Formats: CD, DD	18	ARIA: Gold
The Essential Troy Cassar-Daley	Release date: 22 April 2011; Label: Sony (886977644320); Formats: CD	—	
Lost & Found	Release date: 28 March 2018; Label: Bloodlines (9341004057951); Formats: Download, streaming	—	
Greatest Hits	Release date: 19 October 2018; Label: Bloodlines (BLOOD33); Formats: CD, vinyl, download, streaming	7	

=== Extended plays ===
Title	Details
Together Alone Tour (with Ian Moss)	Release date: 25 February 2022; Label: Formats: CD, DD, streaming; Recorded live at Freight Train Studios

== Awards and nominations ==
Cassar-Daley received his 45th Golden Guitar at the 53rd edition of the awards in January 2025. He has also received nine Deadly Awards (Australian Indigenous Artist Awards), four Country Music Association of Australia Entertainer of the Year awards, and two National Indigenous Music Awards.

=== AIR Awards ===
The Australian Independent Record Awards (commonly known informally as AIR Awards) is an annual awards night to recognise, promote and celebrate the success of Australia's Independent Music sector. They commenced in 2006.

Year	Nominee / work	Award	Result
2011	Troy Cassar-Daley Live	Best Independent Artist	Nominated
2015	Freedom Ride	Best Independent Country Album	Nominated

=== APRA Awards ===
Cassar-Daley had been nominated for twelve awards, winning three at the APRA Awards.

Year	Nominee / work	Award	Result
1998	"Little Things"	Most Performed Country Work	Nominated
1999	"Biggest Disappointment"	Most Performed Country Work	Nominated
2000	"They Don't Make 'Em Like That Anymore"	Most Performed Country Work	Nominated
2004	"Wish I Was a Train" (with Paul Kelly)	Most Performed Country Work	Nominated
2005	"Factory Man"	Most Performed Country Work	Nominated
2007	"Going Back Home"	Most Performed Country Work	Nominated
2008	"Everything's Going to be Alright"	Country Work of the Year	Won
2010	"Big Big Love"	Song of the Year	Nominated
2010	"Big Big Love"	Country Work of the Year	Won
2012	"Country Is" (Troy Cassar-Daley / Colin Buchanan)	Song of the Year	Shortlisted
2013	"Country Is"	Most Performed Country Work	Nominated
2013	"Home"	Song of the Year	Shortlisted
2016	"Another Australian Day"	Song of the Year	Shortlisted
2016	"Freedom Ride" (with Paul Kelly)	Song of the Year	Shortlisted
2020	"Wouldn't Change a Thing"	Most Performed Country Work of the Year	Nominated
2020	"Shutting Down Our Town" (Cassar-Daley) by Jimmy Barnes featuring Troy Cassar-Daley	Most Performed Rock Work of the Year	Won
2024	"Nullarbor Plain" (Ian Moss and Troy Cassar-Daley) by Ian Moss	Most Performed Rock Work	Nominated

=== ARIA Awards ===
Cassar-Daley has been nominated for thirteen awards, winning five at the ARIA Music Awards

Year	Nominee / work	Award	Result
1995	Beyond the Dancing	Best Country Album	Won
1997	"True Believers"	Best Country Album	Nominated
1998	True Believer	Best Country Album	Nominated
2000	Big River	Best Country Album	Won
2002	Long Way Home	Best Country Album	Nominated
2004	Borrowed & Blue	Best Country Album	Nominated
2006	Brighter Day	Best Country Album	Won
2009	I Love This Place	Best Country Album	Won
2011	Troy Cassar-Daley Live	Best Country Album	Nominated
2012	Home	Best Country Album	Nominated
2013	The Great Country Songbook (with Adam Harvey)	Best Country Album	Nominated
2015	Freedom Ride	Best Country Album	Nominated
2021	The World Today	Best Country Album	Won
2024	Between the Fires	Best Country Album	Won
2024	Between the Fires	Best Solo Artist	Nominated
2024	Michael Bryers for Troy Cassar-Daley - Between the Fires	Best Cover Art	Nominated

=== CMAA Awards ===
The Country Music Awards of Australia is an annual awards night held in January during the Tamworth Country Music Festival, celebrating recording excellence in the Australian country music industry. Cassar-Daley has won forty-five awards, the most of any artist. Cassar-Daley was inducted into the Australian Roll of Renown in 2019.

Year	Nominee / work	Award	Result (wins only)
1996	"End of the Road"	Male Vocalist of the Year	Won
1998	True Believer	Album of the Year	Won
1998	"Little Things"	Male Vocalist of the Year	Won
1998	"Little Things"	Video of the Year	Won
2000	"They Don't Make 'Em Like That Anymore"	Male Vocalist of the Year	Won
2000	"They Don't Make 'Em Like That Anymore"	ARPA Song of the Year	Won
2003	"Born to Survive"	Male Vocalist of the Year	Won
2003	"Wish I Was a Train" (with Paul Kelly)	Vocal Collaboration of the Year	Won
2003	"Born to Survive"	ARPA Song of the Year	Won
2006	"Lonesome But Free"	Male Vocalist of the Year	Won
2006	"Bird On A Wire" (with Jimmy Barnes)	Vocal Collaboration of the Year	Won
2006	"Yellow Belly"	Instrumental of the Year	Won
2006	"Lonesome But Free"	ARPA Song of the Year	Won
2008	"Everything's Going To Be Alright"	Male Vocalist of the Year	Won
2010	I Love This Place	Male Vocalist of the Year	Won
2010	I Love This Place	Album of the Year	Won
2010	"Ain't Gonna Change for You" (with The McClymonts)	Vocal Collaboration of the Year	Won
2010	"Chasin' Rodeo"	Heritage Song of the Year	Won
2010	"Big Big Love"	APRA Song of the Year	Won
2010	"Big Big Love"	Single of the Year	Won
2011	"Sacred Bones"	Toyota Heritage Song of the Year	Won
2013	Home	Male Vocalist of the Year	Won
2013	Home	Album of the Year (Artist)	Won
2013	Home	Album of the Year (Producer)	Won
2013	"Country Is"	Single of the Year	Won
2013	"Home"	APRA Song of the Year	Won
2015	"My Country My Land" (with Dean Perrett)	Vocal Collaboration of the Year	Won
2016	Freedom Ride	Album of the Year (Artist)	Won
2016	Freedom Ride	Album of the Year (Producer)	Won
2016	"Freedom Ride"	Male Vocalist of the Year	Won
2016	"Freedom Ride"	Toyota Heritage Song of the Year	Won
2016	"Freedom Ride"	APRA Song of the Year	Won
2016	"Take a Walk in My Country"	Single of the Year	Won
2016	Troy Cassar-Daley"	CMAA Producer of the Year	Won
2017	Things I Carry Round	Album of the Year (Artist)	Won
2017	Things I Carry Round	Album of the Year (Producer)	Won
2019	"Shadows on the Hill"	Heritage Song of the Year	Won
2019	himself	Australian Roll of Renown	inductee
2022	The World Today	Top Selling Album of the Year	Won
2022	himself	Male Artist of the Year	Won
2022	"South" (with Ian Moss)	Vocal Collaboration of the Year	Won
2025	Between the Fires	Album of the Year (Artist)	Won
2025	Between the Fires	Alt Country Album of the Year	Won
2025	himself	Male Artist of the Year	Won
2025	"Windradyne"	Heritage Song of the Year	Won
2025	"Some Days" (Troy Cassar-Daley & Kevin Bennett)	Song of the Year	Won

=== Deadly Awards ===
The Deadly Awards, (commonly known simply as The Deadlys), was an annual celebration of Australian Aboriginal and Torres Strait Islander achievement in music, sport, entertainment and community. They ran from 1996 to 2013.

Year	Nominee / work	Award	Result
1997	True Believer	Album of the Year	Won
2001	himself	Country Artist of the Year	Won
2003	himself	Male Artist of the Year	Won
2004	himself	Male Artist of the Year	Won
2006	himself	Male Artist of the Year	Won
2006	"Lonesome But Free"	Single of the Year	Won
2007	"Going Back Home"	Song of the Year	Won
2012	Home	Album of the Year	Won
2013	himself	Male Artist of the Year	Won

=== Environmental Music Prize ===
The Environmental Music Prize is a quest to find a theme song to inspire action on climate and conservation. It commenced in 2022.

Year	Nominee / work	Award	Result	Ref.
2023	Back On Country"	Environmental Music Prize	Nominated	

=== Mo Awards ===
The Australian Entertainment Mo Awards (commonly known informally as the Mo Awards), were annual Australian entertainment industry awards. They recognise achievements in live entertainment in Australia from 1975 to 2016. Troy Cassar-Daley won six awards in that time.

Year	Nominee / work	Award	Result (wins only)
1997	Troy Cassar-Daley	Male Country Entertainer of the Year	Won
1998	Troy Cassar-Daley	Male Country Entertainer of the Year	Won
1999	Troy Cassar-Daley	Male Country Entertainer of the Year	Won
2002	Troy Cassar-Daley	Male Country Entertainer of the Year	Won
2003	Troy Cassar-Daley	Male Country Entertainer of the Year	Won
2008	Troy Cassar-Daley	Slim Dusty Male Country Vocal Performer of the Year	Won

=== National Indigenous Music Awards ===
The National Indigenous Music Awards recognise excellence, innovation and leadership among Aboriginal and Torres Strait Islander musicians from throughout Australia. They commenced in 2004.

Year	Nominee / work	Award	Result
2012	himself	Artist of the Year	Nominated
2012	Home	Album of the Year	Nominated
2017	himself	Artist of the Year	Won
2017	Things I Carry Around	Album of the Year	Won
2017	"Things I Carry Around"	Song of the Year	Nominated
2021	"Back On Country"	Film Clip of the Year	Nominated
2024	Between the Fires	Album of the Year	Nominated

=== Queensland Music Awards ===
The Queensland Music Awards (previously known as Q Song Awards) are annual awards celebrating Queensland, Australia's brightest emerging artists and established legends. They commenced in 2006.

Year	Nominee / work	Award	Result (wins only)	Ref.
2009	"Big Big Love"	Published Song of the Year	Won	
2025	Between the Fires	Album of the Year	Won	
