= The McClymonts discography =

- Studio albums: 6
- EPs: 1
- Compilation albums: 1
- Singles: 27

Australian country music trio The McClymonts have released six studio albums, one compilation, one extended play, and twenty-seven singles.

== Albums ==
=== Studio albums ===
List of studio albums, with selected chart positions and certifications shown
| Title | Album details | Peak chart positions | | | Certifications |
| Title | Album details | AUS | AUS Country | US Country | Certifications |
|---|---|---|---|---|---|
| Chaos and Bright Lights | Released: 12 November 2007; Label: Universal; Formats: CD, LP, digital download | 37 | 2 | 73 | AUS: Gold |
| Wrapped Up Good | Released: 15 January 2010; Label: Universal; Formats: CD, LP, digital download | 2 | 1 | — | AUS: Gold |
| Two Worlds Collide | Released: 18 May 2012; Label: Universal; Formats: CD, LP, digital download | 7 | 1 | — | |
| Here's to You & I | Released: 4 July 2014; Label: Universal; Formats: CD, LP, digital download | 8 | 1 | — | |
| Endless | Released: 13 January 2017; Label: Universal; Formats: CD, Digital download, streaming | 3 | 1 | — | |
| Mayhem to Madness | Released: 12 June 2020; Label: Universal, Island Australia; Formats: CD, Digital download, streaming, LP | 3 | 1 | — | |
"—" denotes releases that did not chart

=== Compilation albums ===
List of Compilation albums, with selected details
| Title | Album details |
|---|---|
| The Studio Recordings: 2006-2012 | Release date: 15 August 2014; Label: Universal; Note: 4-CD Box Set |

== Extended plays ==
List of Extended Plays, with selected chart positions
| Title | Album details | Peak chart positions |
| Title | Album details | AUS |
|---|---|---|
| The McClymonts EP | Released: 5 June 2006; Label: Universal; Formats: CD, LP, digital download | 40 |

== Singles ==
| Year | Single | Peak positions | | Album |
| Year | Single | AUS | AUS Country | Album |
|---|---|---|---|---|
| 2006 | "Something That My Heart Does" (Note: Digital-only single.) | — | — | The McClymonts |
| 2007 | "Baby's Gone Home" | — | — | The McClymonts |
| 2007 | "Save Yourself" | 76 | — | Chaos and Bright Lights |
| 2007 | "My Life Again" | — | — | Chaos and Bright Lights |
| 2008 | "Finally Over Blue" | — (Note: "Finally Over Blue" did not enter the ARIA Singles Chart, but reached number eighty-five on ARIA Physical Sales Chart.) | — | Chaos and Bright Lights |
| 2008 | "Shotgun" | — | — | Chaos and Bright Lights |
| 2008 | "Favourite Boyfriend of the Year" | — | — | Chaos and Bright Lights |
| 2009 | "Kick It Up" | 71 | — | Wrapped Up Good |
| 2009 | "Wrapped Up Good" | — | — | Wrapped Up Good |
| 2010 | "Hearts on Fire" | — | — | Wrapped Up Good |
| 2011 | "A Woman Is a Flame" | — | — | Wrapped Up Good |
| 2012 | "I Could Be a Cowboy" | — | — | Wrapped Up Good |
| 2012 | "How Long Have You Known" | — | — | Two Worlds Collide |
| 2012 | "Piece of Me" | — | — | Two Worlds Collide |
| 2012 | "Little Old Beat Up Heart" | — | — | Two Worlds Collide |
| 2012 | "This Ain't Over" | — | — | Two Worlds Collide |
| 2014 | "Going Under (Didn't Have To)" | 91 | — | Here's to You & I |
| 2014 | "Here's to You & I" | — | — | Here's to You & I |
| 2014 | "Forever Begins Tonight" | — | — | Here's to You & I |
| 2016 | "House" | — | — | Endless |
| 2017 | "Don't Wish It All Away" | — | — | Endless |
| 2018 | "Like We Used To" | — | 3 | Endless |
| 2020 | "I Got This" | — | 1 | Mayhem to Madness |
| 2020 | "Open Heart" | — | 9 | Mayhem to Madness |
| 2020 | "Free Fall" | — | 1 | Mayhem to Madness |
| 2021 | "Looking for Perfect" | — | 10 | Mayhem to Madness |
| 2021 | "Before I Met You" (with Kaylee Bell) | — | 5 | Silver Linings (Note: Kaylee Bell's album.) |
"—" denotes releases that did not chart or pre-date the current archives for that chart.

== Guest vocals ==
| Year | Single | Artist | Album |
|---|---|---|---|
| 2003 | "Pearls of Wisdom" | Jimmy Little | Down the Road |
| 2009 | "Ain't Gonna Change for You" | Troy Cassar-Daley | I Love This Place |
| 2009 | "Both Sides, Now" | Adam Harvey | Both Sides Now |
| 2010 | "Islands in the Stream" | Ronan Keating | Duet |
| 2011 | "Blue Bayou" | Damien Leith | Roy: A Tribute to Roy Orbison |

== Music videos ==
| Year | Video | Director |
|---|---|---|
| 2006 | "Something That My Heart Does" | |
| 2007 | "Baby's Gone Home" | |
| 2007 | "Shotgun" | Mick Jones |
| 2008 | "Favourite Boyfriend of the Year" | |
| 2008 | "Finally Over Blue" | |
| 2009 | "Kick It Up" | Myles Conti |
| 2009 | "My Life Again" | Walter May |
| 2010 | "Hearts on Fire" | Myles Conti |
| 2010 | "Save Yourself" | Myles Conti |
| 2011 | "Wrapped Up Good" | Myles Conti |
| 2011 | "Blue Bayou" (feat. Damien Leith) | Mick Jones |
| 2011 | "A Woman is A Flame" | Myles Conti |
| 2012 | "How Long Have You Known?" | Myles Conti |
| 2012 | "I Could Be a Cowboy" | Duncan Toombs |
| 2012 | "Piece of Me" | Duncan Toombs |
| 2012 | "Where You Are" | Duncan Toombs |
| 2012 | "Two Worlds Collide" | Duncan Toombs |
| 2014 | "Going Under (Didn't Have To)" | Duncan Toombs |
| 2014 | "Here's to You & I" | Myles Conti |
| 2014 | "Forever Begins Tonight" | Ben Abbott |
| 2016 | "Baby's Gone Home" | |
| 2017 | "Don't Wish It All Away" | Ken Carpenter |
| 2018 | "Like We Used To" | Trey Fanjoy |
| 2020 | "I Got This" | Bradley Murnane |
