= When Love Comes to Town (TV series) =

- Genre: reality
- Presented by: Natalie Gruzlewski
- Country of origin: Australia
- Original language: English
- No. of seasons: 1
- No. of episodes: 8

Production
- Running time: 60 minutes

Original release
- Network: Nine Network
- Release: 20 May – 24 June 2014

When Love Comes to Town is an Australian dating reality television series that first aired on the Nine Network on 20 May 2014. The series is hosted by Natalie Gruzlewski, who previously also hosted a similar series The Farmer Wants a Wife.

== Format ==
A group of city girls travel the country, stopping in regional areas to meet eligible bachelors. If the chemistry’s right, they can choose to stay on and pursue a relationship, otherwise it’s back on the bus and on to the next location.

== The Single Ladies ==
Name	Age	Occupation	Location	No. of destinations	Found Love?
Jessica	27	Car Hire Coordinator	Brisbane	1	No
Ainslie	35	Surfwear Sales Rep	Perth	4	No
Kelly	29	Nanny	Sydney	1	Yes
JJ	30	Advertising Executive	Melbourne	2	Yes
Rebekah	22	Law Student & Legal Secretary	Adelaide	3	Yes
Renee	24	Corporate PR	—N/a	4	Yes
Amanda	30	Sales	Brisbane	2	Yes
Shelley	29	Accountant	Sydney	2	Yes
Abbey	28	Business Banker	Perth	3	Yes
Tash	28	Burlesque Dance Teacher	Brisbane	3	No
Mindy	27	HR Consultant	Brisbane	1	Yes
Zoe	30	Marketing Director	—N/a	4	Yes
Nikki	27	Personal Trainer	—N/a	2	Yes
Amy	28	Architect	—N/a	1	No
Caitlin	22	Student	—N/a	2	Yes
Jennifer	24	Beautician	—N/a	1	No

== The Bachelors ==
Name	Age	Occupation	Location
Adam	29	Carpenter	Margaret River, WA
Moshe	26	Lawyer	Margaret River, WA
Gav	26	Stonemason	Kangaroo Island, SA
Tom	31	Mechanic/Farmer	Kangaroo Island, SA
Andy	35	Winemaker	Barossa Valley, SA
Josh	30	Winemaker	Barossa Valley, SA
Bill	33	Cray Fisherman	Robe, SA
Charlie	29	Surf Instructor & Farmer	Robe, SA
Leigh	26	Hairdresser	Sale, VIC
Reggie	25	Personal Trainer	Sale, VIC
Adrian	33	Furniture Maker	Cobram, VIC
John	25	Cactus Farmer	Cobram, VIC
Mitch	25	Rural Contractor	Orange, NSW
Sam	25	PE Teacher	Orange, NSW
Shadid	25	Veterinarian Surgeon	Port Macquarie, NSW
Stu	25	Restaurant Manager & Golf Player	Port Macquarie, NSW
Tom	26	Mechanical Engineer	Mount Isa, QLD
James	29	Doctor	Mount Isa, QLD
Kendal	36	Plumber	Airlie Beach, QLD
Doug	27	Boilermaker	Airlie Beach, QLD

== Results ==
=== Dates ===
Location	Bachelor	The Single Ladies	Found Love?	Ladies Decision
Margaret River, WA	Moshe	Jessica & Renee	No	Both ladies decided not to stay with him
Margaret River, WA	Adam	Abbey & JJ	Yes, with JJ	Abbey decided to leave & JJ stayed with him
Kangaroo Island, SA	Gav	Shelley & Amanda	No	Both ladies decided not to stay with him
Kangaroo Island, SA	Tom	Rebekah & Kelly	Yes, with Kelly	Rebekah decided to leave because of the location & Kelly stayed with him
The Barossa Valley, SA	Andy	Mindy & Abbey	Yes, with Mindy	Abbey decided to leave & Mindy decided to stay with him
The Barossa Valley, SA	Josh	Ainslie & Jess	No	both girls decided to leave
Robe, SA	Bill	Tash & Rebekah	No	Both girls decided not to stay
Robe, SA	Charlie	Amanda & Renee	Yes, with Amanda	Amanda decided to stay with him & Renee decided they're better off being friends
Sale, VIC	Leigh	Abbey & Tash	Yes, with Abbey	Abbey decided to stay & Tash decided she didn't want to stay
Sale, VIC	Reggie	Zoe & Shelley	Yes, with Shelley	Zoe decided to leave & Shelley decided to stay with him
Cobram, VIC	Adrian	Ainslie & Zoe	No	Both of the girls decided to leave
Cobram, VIC	John	Caitlin & Renee	No	Caitlin decided to leave & Renee left after receiving bad news about her grandfather
Orange, NSW	Mitch	Nikki & Renee	Yes, with Renee	Nikki bowed out and left & Renee stayed behind with him
Orange, NSW	Sam	Jess & Rebekah	Yes, with Rebekah	Jess decided to leave & Rebekah stayed with him
Port Macquarie, NSW	Shadid	Nikki & JJ	Yes, with Nikki	Nikki stayed with him & JJ didn't feel a connection between them and left
Port Macquarie, NSW	Stu	Amy & Caitlin	Yes, with Caitlin	Caitlin chose to stay with him & Amy decided to leave
Mount Isla, QLD	Tom	Jess & Caitlin	No	Both of the girls left
Mount Isla, QLD	James	Ainslie & Zoe	No	Both of the girls decided to leave
Airlie Beach, QLD	Kendal	Ainslie & Tash	No	Both girls didn't have feelings for him and they left
Airlie Beach, QLD	Doug	Zoe & Jennifer	Yes, with Zoe	Zoe was smitten by him and decided to stay & Jennifer decided to leave

=== Couples ===
Couple	Location	Current Status
Adam & JJ	Margaret River, WA	Separated
Tom & Kelly	Kangaroo Island, SA	Separated
Andy & Mindy	The Barossa Valley, SA	Separated
Charlie & Jemma	Robe, SA	Separated
Leigh & Abbey	Sale, VIC	Together
Reggie & Shelley	Sale, VIC	Separated
Mitch & Renee	Orange, NSW	Together
Sam & Rebekah	Orange, NSW	Separated
Shadid & Nikki	Port Macquarie, NSW	Together
Stu & Caitlin	Port Macquarie, NSW	Unknown
Doug & Zoe	Airlie Beach, QLD	Together

== Ratings ==
Episode		Original airdate	Timeslot	Nightly Viewers	Nightly Rank	Ref
1	"Episode 1"	20 May 2014	Tuesday 8:30 pm	868,000	#9	
2	"Episode 2"	21 May 2014	Wednesday 8:30 pm	647,000	#16	
3	"Episode 3"	27 May 2014	Tuesday 8:30 pm	636,000	#19	
4	"Episode 4"	3 June 2014	Tuesday 8:30 pm	657,000	#16	
5	"Episode 5"	10 June 2014	Tuesday 8:30 pm	625,000	#18	
6	"Episode 6"	17 June 2014	Tuesday 8:30 pm	—N/a		
7	"Episode 7"	17 June 2014	Tuesday 9:30 pm	—N/a		
8	"Episode 8"	24 June 2014	Tuesday 8:30 pm	—N/a		

== International broadcasting ==
- Italy: It was broadcast in 2016 on Sky Uno,
