= The Farmer Wants a Wife (Australian TV series) season 15 =

Reality show in Australia

The Farmer Wants a Wife
- Season 15
- Starring: Corey; Jarrad; Thomas; Tom
- Presented by: Natalie Gruzlewski
- No. of episodes: 19

Release
- Original network: Seven Network
- Original release: 21 April – 23 June 2025

Season chronology
- ← Previous; Season 14

The fifteenth season of The Farmer Wants a Wife premiered on 21 April 2025.

The show started with four farmers, and thirty-two ladies on speed dates. In 2024 it was indicated there were eight potential farmers, which came down to five, before an unexpected exit of one farmer.

Natalie Gruzlewski returned as host after previous host and long-time newsreader Samantha Armytage departed the Channel 7 network.

== The farmers ==
Farmer	Age	Location	Profession
Corey	24	Biloela, Queensland	Beans, hay and cotton farmer
Jarrad	21	Stanthorpe, Queensland	Sheep farmer
Thomas	35	Kimba, South Australia	Wheat, barley and lentil farmer
Tom	31	Borambola, New South Wales	Sheep farmer

== Contestants ==
=== Corey's dates ===
Name	Age	Hometown	Occupation	Eliminated
Jadee-Lee	26	Queensland	Primary school teacher	
Keeley	22	Victoria	Optometrist	
Chelsea	26	Victoria	Registered nurse	Episode 8
Hunter	23	Queensland	Administrative officer	Episode 5
Rosie	22	Tasmania	Dental assistant	Episode 3 (Note: Rosie left on her own accord)
Ellie Heazlewood	26	Queensland	Early childhood educator	Episode 1
Jamie	23	Victoria	Speech pathologist	Episode 1
Millie	22	Queensland	Aged care support worker	Episode 1

=== Jarrad's dates ===
Name	Age	Hometown	Occupation	Eliminated
Chloe	21	Queensland	Bartender	
Ashlee	22	Victoria	Education support worker	Episode 6
Brianna	22	Queensland	Jewellery store manager	Episode 5
Lucy	23	Victoria	Jillaroo	Episode 5
Maneesha Davis	25	NSW	Jewellery business owner	Episode 3
Ella	22	Queensland	Registered nurse	Episode 2
Holly	22	Queensland	Teacher	Episode 2
Imogen	21	South Australia	Real estate agent	Episode 2

=== Thomas' dates ===
Name	Age	Hometown	Occupation	Eliminated
Clarette	35	NSW	Teacher	
Rachael	34	Victoria	Construction coordinator	
Ellen	32	Western Australia	Public servant	Episode 8
Claire Hampson	31	Western Australia	FIFO mine site administration	Episode 4 (Note: Claire left on her own accord)
Nathania	33	Queensland	Blasting specialist	Episode 3
Ashleen	35	Western Australia	Senior event manager	Episode 1
Edwina	29	NSW	Radiographer	Episode 1
Sophie	32	Victoria	Teacher	Episode 1

=== Tom's dates ===
Name	Age	Hometown	Occupation	Eliminated
Georgie	28	Victoria	Registered nurse	
Eliza Wood	28	Victoria	Primary school teacher	Episode 10
Emma	27	Western Australia	Registered nurse	Episode 8
Bridget	34	NSW	Lawyer	Episode 3 (Note: Emmie-Rose and Bridget left on their own accord)
Emmie-Rose Shore	29	NSW	Fitness coach	Episode 3
Kaitlin Pearce	30	NSW	Equine sales	Episode 2
Katie	28	Queensland	Department of Education administration	Episode 2
Natalie	30	Queensland	Registered nurse	Episode 2

== Ratings ==
No.	Title	Air date	Timeslot	National reach viewers	National total viewers	Night rank	Ref(s)
1	Episode 1	21 April 2024	Monday 7:30 pm	1,768,000	941,000	4	
2	Episode 2	22 April 2024	Tuesday 7:30 pm	1,883,000	893,000	4	
3	Episode 3	28 April 2025	Monday 7:30 pm	1,603,000	833,000	5	
4	Episode 4	29 April 2025	Tuesday 7:30 pm	1,646,000	848,000	4	
5	Episode 5 – Solo dates	5 May 2025	Monday 7:30 pm	1,525,000	837,000	7	
6	Episode 6 – Ladies' dates	6 May 2025	Tuesday 7:30 pm	1,578,000	810,000	5	
7	Episode 7	12 May 2025	Monday 7:30 pm	1,522,000	823,000	6	
8	Episode 8	13 May 2025	Tuesday 7:30 pm	1,441,000	764,000	6	
9	Episode 9	19 May 2025	Monday 7:30 pm	1,514,000	782,000	6	
10	Episode 10	20 May 2025	Tuesday 7:30 pm	1,534,000	807,000	6	
11	Episode 11	26 May 2025	Monday 7:30 pm	1,405,000	820,000	8	
12	Episode 12	27 May 2025	Tuesday 7:30 pm	1,473,000	844,000	7	
13	Episode 13	2 June 2025	Monday 7:30 pm	1,476,000	842,000	6	
14	Episode 14	3 June 2025	Tuesday 7:30 pm	1,411,000	806,000	6	
15	Episode 15 – 24 hour date	9 June 2025	Monday 7:30 pm	1,592,000	890,000	6	
16	Episode 16	10 June 2025	Tuesday 7:30 pm	1,437,000	853,000	8	
17	Episode 17 –	16 June 2025	Monday 7:30 pm	1,588,000	890,000	6	
18	Episode 18 - Finale	17 June 2025	Tuesday 7:30 pm	1,561,000	855,000	6	
19	Episode 19 - Reunion	23 June 2025	Monday 7:30 pm	1,135,000	694,000	13	
