= Marie Coleman =

Australian feminist, social activist, public servant and journalist

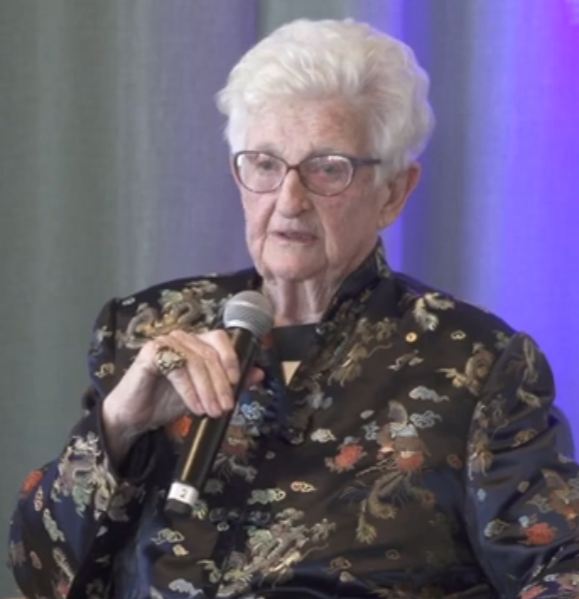
- At ANU's Pamela Denoon Lecture in 2023
- Born: Marie Yvonne Burns; 1933 (age 91–92); Dubbo, New South Wales, Australia
- Education: University of Sydney
- Occupation(s): Feminist, social activist, public servant and journalist

Marie Yvonne Coleman, AO, PSM (née Burns; born 1933) is an Australian feminist, social activist, public servant and journalist. She was the first woman to head an Australian national statutory authority. She spent over 60 years campaigning against the gender pay gap and other social injustices.

== Early life and education ==
Coleman, an only child, was born in 1933 in Dubbo, New South Wales, to Kathleen (née Nunan), a shop assistant at Western Stores. Her father, Alexander Burns, worked for the NSW Railways. The family moved frequently throughout her childhood, requiring her to change schools many times as her father was looking for advancements in his career.

She first attended school at Hunter Valley, continued to NSW Government Education Department's Black Friars Correspondence School, then Dubbo Primary School, Orange Primary School, Orange High School, and finished at Lithgow High School.

Coleman attended the University of Sydney in 1950, studying economics and politics for an Arts degree, then completed a diploma in social studies. She was editor of the student newspaper, Honi Soit, and was only the second woman to hold that title. She was talented in the classroom and on the field, playing Inter-Varsity cricket, as well as international debating, and being a member of the university's Student Representative Council.

== Career ==
Coleman spent over 60 years campaigning against the gender pay gap and other social injustices.

Coleman was appointed and held the position of chair of the National Social Welfare Commission by the Whitlam government in 1972 to 1975 – the first woman in Australia to head a national statutory authority. In 1976, she was selected as the Director of the Office of Childcare, and during this time, the Australian Commonwealth began supporting Aboriginal Child supports creating before and after school daycare, and a program for female refugees.

In 1989 Coleman was a founding member of the National Foundation for Australian Women and an active participant in the Australian Women's Archives Project.

Following her retirement from the Australian Public Service in 1995, Coleman became a columnist with the Canberra Times until 2003. One of her earliest jobs had been as reporter for the social pages of the Daily Telegraph in Sydney. In 2012 she worked for the Australian Women's Archives Project and for the Social Policy Committee of the National Council for Australian Women.

== Awards and recognition ==
- 1990 awarded Public Service Medal (PSM)
- 2001 awarded Centenary Medal "for service to Australian society and government"
- 2001 inducted into the Victorian Honour Roll of Women
- 2003 Chair of the Advisory Board to the "Hindmarsh Education Centre, at the Quamby Youth Detention Centre, Australian Capital Territory."
- 2006 awarded an EDNA Ryan Award for her service to government
- 2011 ACT Senior Australian of the Year for her work as an advocate for women
- 2011 Queen's Birthday Honours appointed an Officer of the Order of Australia (AO) "for distinguished service to the advancement of women, particularly through the National Foundation for Australian Women and the Australian Women's Archives project."

== Personal life ==
In 1956 Coleman married James Harry Coleman, of Melbourne, Victoria. They had three daughters.

She made a cameo appearance in the 2024 season of the reality television show Farmer Wants a Wife, helping her grandson Joe Bobbin choose a wife from four female contestants.
