= The Farmer Wants a Wife (Australian TV series) season 12 =

The Farmer Wants a Wife
- Season 12
- Starring: Ben Scowen; Benjamin Jackson; Harry Lloyd; Paige Marsh; Will Simpson
- Presented by: Natalie Gruzlewski; Samantha Armytage
- No. of contestants: 50
- No. of episodes: 13

Release
- Original network: Seven Network
- Original release: 4 September – 4 October 2022

Season chronology
- ← Previous; Season 11 Next → Season 13

The twelfth season of The Farmer Wants a Wife premiered on 4 September 2022.

Natalie Gruzlewski returned as host, guiding five farmers on their journey to find love with eight contestants. Sam Armytage joined Gruzlewski as a special guest throughout the season. Halfway through the season, Armytage introduced two new contestants to each of the farmers.

Farmer Benjamin temporarily left the show after the death of his grandmother. While away, he was diagnosed with an undisclosed illness that forced him to exit the show for good.

== The farmers ==
Farmer	Age	Location	Profession
Ben Scowen	27	Wingham, NSW	Dairy Farmer
Benjamin Jackson	33	Guyra, NSW	Sheep Farmer
Harry Lloyd	24	Kyabram, VIC	Sheep & Cattle Farmer
Paige Marsh	27	Cassilis, NSW	Sheep & Cattle Farmer
Will Simpson	27	Berriwillock, VIC	Crop & Sheep Farmer

== Contestants ==
=== Ben's dates ===
Name	Age	Hometown	Occupation	Eliminated
Aleisha 'Leish' Mackail	31	Queensland	Hospital Administrator	Winner
Kiani Olsen	24	New South Wales	Beauty Therapist	Runner-Up
Maddison Lawn	25	New South Wales	Visual Merchandiser	Episode 10
Lauren Holmes	24	Victoria	Vet Nurse	Episode 8 (quit)
Danni	27	New South Wales	Vet Nurse	Episode 7
Lisa Hands	32	New South Wales	Salon Owner	Episode 5 (quit)
Renee Hamilton	29	New South Wales	Recruitment Consultant	Episode 3
Ashleigh Grant	23	New South Wales	Social Media Manager	Episode 1
Ashlea Dahlblom	33	Victoria	Pilates Instructor	Episode 1
Emily Madge	29	New South Wales	Plant Operator	Episode 1
Janika Armanno	32	New South Wales	Communications Officer	Episode 1

=== Benjamin's dates ===
Name	Age	Hometown	Occupation	Eliminated
Erin Dore	32	Queensland	Flower Farmer	Episode 10
Hannah Gracey	29	Queensland	Event Planner	Episode 10
Lyndsay Dowsett	36	New South Wales	Music Teacher	Episode 10
Madelene	33	Victoria	People and Culture Advisor	Episode 9
Laura	34	New South Wales	Medical Receptionist	Episode 7
Jen	37	New South Wales	Fitness Trainer	Episode 5
Courtney Hopewell	33	New South Wales	Interior Designer	Episode 3
Brittani	30	New South Wales	Nutritionist	Episode 1
Diana Gyllen	34	New South Wales	Model	Episode 1
Hayley Holloway	28	Queensland	Personal Assistant	Episode 1
Molly Brown	37	Queensland	Nurse	Episode 1
Sophie Le Couteur	32	New South Wales	Artist	Episode 1

=== Harry's dates ===
Name	Age	Hometown	Occupation	Eliminated
Tess Brookman	22	Queensland	Psychology Student	Winner
Bronte Dunne	27	Queensland	Insurance Claims Specialist	Runner-Up
Rommi Chaka	24	New South Wales	Retail Manager	Episode 10
Isabella	22	New South Wales	Ski Lift Operator	Episode 8
Bec	26	Queensland	Account Manager	Episode 7
Gabrielle Dowd	23	Queensland	Senior Property Manager	Episode 5
Elise Clements	22	South Australia	Artist	Episode 3
Alex Uren	23	Victoria	Equine Learning Practitioner	Episode 1
Gabby	22	Victoria	Social Worker	Episode 1
Georgia Twyford	22	Victoria	Podiatry Student	Episode 1
Natalie	23	Queensland	Hairdresser	Episode 1

=== Paige's dates ===
Name	Age	Hometown	Occupation	Eliminated
Ayden Holmes	34	New South Wales	Builder	Episode 12
Cody Luff	27	New South Wales	Underground Driller	Episode 12
Dylan Youd	29	Victoria	Carpenter	Episode 7
Glen Payne	26	New South Wales	Carpenter	Episode 7
James Flynn	30	Victoria	Electrician	Episode 5 (quit)
Marty Bird	36	New South Wales	Handyman	Episode 3 (quit)
Chris Winspear	31	New South Wales	Writer	Episode 2
Ged Blum	33	Victoria	Fitter and Turner	Episode 2
Josh Huxtable	27	Australian Capital Territory	Demolition Contractor	Episode 2
Sam Graham	35	Queensland	Carpenter	Episode 2
Spiros Agathos	25	New South Wales	Gym Owner	Episode 2

=== Will's dates ===
Name	Age	Hometown	Occupation	Eliminated
Jessica Cova	25	Queensland	Dental Nurse	Winner
Madi Simpson	25	Victoria	Legal Assistant	Runner-Up
Holly Fowler	23	Tasmania	Account Manager	Episode 10
Tiana	27	Victoria	Events Manager	Episode 7
Alicia Galloway	24	Victoria	Hairdresser	Episode 5
Keeley Smart	24	Victoria	Personal Assistant	Episode 4 (quit)
Sahara McLellan	25	Australian Capital Territory	Maritime Personnel Operator	Episode 3
Ariel Chu	25	Victoria	Events Manager	Episode 1
Katelyn	23	Victoria	Beauty Educator	Episode 1
Zoe Dawes	23	Queensland	Animal Nutritionist	Episode 1

== Ratings ==
No.	Title	Air date	Timeslot	Overnight ratings		Ref(s)
No.	Title	Air date	Timeslot	Viewers	Rank	Ref(s)
1	Episode 1	4 September 2022	Sunday 7:00pm	646,000	4	
2	Episode 2	5 September 2022	Monday 7:30pm	546,000	12	
3	Episode 3	6 September 2022	Tuesday 7:30pm	526,000	8	
4	Episode 4	11 September 2022	Sunday 7:00pm	659,000	4	
5	Episode 5	12 September 2022	Monday 7:30pm	555,000	11	
6	Episode 6	13 September 2022	Tuesday 7:30pm	555,000	8	
7	Episode 7	20 September 2022	Tuesday 7:30pm	534,000	9	
8	Episode 8	21 September 2022	Wednesday 7:30pm	541,000	8	
9	Episode 9	25 September 2022	Sunday 7:00pm	575,000	5	
10	Episode 10	26 September 2022	Monday 7:30pm	560,000	9	
11	Episode 11	27 September 2022	Tuesday 7:30pm	596,000	7	
12	Episode 12: Finale	3 October 2022	Monday 7:30pm	582,000	9	
13	Episode 13: Reunion	4 October 2022	Tuesday 7:30pm	591,000	7	
