= Cookin' in my Kitchen =

Single by Samantha McClymont
- A-side: "Cookin' in my Kitchen"
- B-side: "Heart of a Man"
- Released: 18 July 2005
- Recorded: Ramrod Studios
- Genre: Country pop
- Label: ABC Music
- Songwriter(s): Brooke McClymont, Rick Price
- Producer(s): Herm Kovac

"Cookin' in my Kitchen" is the first single, released in 2005, by Australian country music singer Samantha McClymont. She has not released further solo material since joining her sisters to form The McClymonts.

== Background ==
McClymont won the Star Maker award at the 2005 Tamworth Country Music Festival. Her prize included a recording session at Ramrod Studios, production and distribution of a CD through the ABC Music label of the two tracks recorded and a video clip of one of the songs. "Cookin' in my Kitchen" (b/w the self-penned "Heart of a Man") was the resulting single.

== Charts and awards ==
"Cookin' in my Kitchen" reached Number 3 on the Australian country music chart in 2005.

"Heart of a Man", with a stronger country music sound, went on to reach Number 1 in 2006, remaining on the chart for 17 weeks.

At the 2006 Country Music Awards of Australia, "Cookin' in my Kitchen" won the award of New Talent of the Year for McClymont.

"Heart of a Man" also earned McClymont a nomination for Female Vocalist of the Year at the same awards.

== Videography ==
- "Cookin' in my Kitchen
- "Heart of a Man
