= The McClymonts (EP) =

EP by The McClymonts
- Released: 5 June 2006 (Australia)
- Recorded: RockingHorse Studios, Byron Bay
- Genre: Country
- Length: 15:46
- Label: Universal
- Producer: Steve James

The McClymonts chronology
The McClymonts (2006)	Chaos and Bright Lights (2007)

The McClymonts is an extended play recording by the sister trio The McClymonts, released in Australia on 5 June 2006 (see 2006 in music) by Universal Music Australia. It has a range between country and pop songs – written by Brooke McClymont, Samantha McClymont and Mollie McClymont.

== Track listing ==
1. "Something That My Heart Does" (Brooke McClymont, Eric Nova) – 3:49
2. "Beyond Tomorrow" (B. McClymont, Samantha McClymont, Mollie McClymont) – 4:40
3. "Baby's Gone Home" (B. McClymont, M. McClymont) – 3:04
4. "Love You Like That" (B. McClymont, S. McClymont) – 1:57
5. "Jack" (B. McClymont, S. McClymont, M. McClymont) – 2:16

== Personnel ==
- Brooke McClymont – vocals
- Samantha McClymont – vocals
- Mollie McClymont – vocals
- Warwick Scott – guitar
- Dean Sutherland – bass guitar
- Giuseppe Accaria – drums
- Sam Hannan – keys
- Hugo Marree – fiddle

== Charts ==
Chart (2006)	Peak position
Australia (ARIA)	40
