= The Farmer Wants a Wife (Australian TV series) season 13 =

The Farmer Wants a Wife
- Season 13
- Starring: Andrew Coleman; Brad Jones; Brenton Kuch; David McMahon; Matt Young
- Presented by: Samantha Armytage
- No. of contestants: 50
- No. of episodes: 15

Release
- Original network: Seven Network
- Original release: 10 April – 22 May 2023

Season chronology
- ← Previous; Season 12 Next → Season 14

The thirteenth season of The Farmer Wants a Wife premiered on 10 April 2023.

In February 2023, it was announced Sam Armytage will host the series with long-term host, Natalie Gruzlewski acting as co-host. The pair will help guide five farmers in finding love with eight potential suitors. Halfway through the season, Gruzlewski introduced two new contestants to each of the farmers.

== The farmers ==
Farmer	Age	Location	Profession
Andrew Coleman	41	Narromine, NSW	Mixed Crop & Sheep Farmer
Brad Jones	33	Cootamundra, NSW	Mixed Crop & Cattle Farmer
Brenton Kuch	26	Darriman, VIC	Sheep & Cattle Farmer
David McMahon	29	Pozieres, QLD	Apple Farmer
Matt Young	23	Bookham, NSW	Sheep & Cattle Farmer

== Contestants ==
=== Andrew's dates ===
Name	Age	Hometown	Occupation	Eliminated
Claire Saunders	37	Tasmania	Mine Truck Driver	Winner
Jessie Noble	36	New South Wales	Creative Consultant	Episode 9
Sarah Roach	37	New South Wales	Interior Design Director	Episode 9
Kacy Mateljan	39	Western Australia	Medical Admin	Episode 7
Maddison Walker	30	Queensland	Restaurant Owner	Episode 6
Lucie Gilmour	36	Victoria	Nurse	Episode 5 (quit)
Kelly Brown	44	Western Australia	Business Owner/Head Dog Training and Behaviour Specialist	Episode 3
Kate Hubbard	37	New South Wales	Social Worker	Episode 2
Monique Jeremiah	36	Gold Coast, Queensland	Entrepreneur	Episode 2
Veronica	36	New South Wales	Midwife	Episode 2

=== Brad's dates ===
Name	Age	Hometown	Occupation	Eliminated
Clare Hockings	27	New South Wales	Preschool Teacher	Winner
Morgan Gibbons	31	Queensland	High School Teacher	Runner-Up
Shelby Grant	30	Queensland	Boarding House Supervisor	Episode 11
Corista	31	New South Wales	Public Servant	Episode 6 (quit)
Christina Cankovic	25	New South Wales	Registered Nurse	Episode 5
Natasha Diamond	23	New South Wales	Research Scientist	Episode 3
Georgina	33	Victoria	Accountant	Episode 2
Hayley Hodges	30	New South Wales	Registered Nurse	Episode 2
Kelsey Moss	32	New South Wales	Exercise Psychologist	Episode 2

=== Brenton's dates ===
Name	Age	Hometown	Occupation	Eliminated
Sophie Holcombe	25	Queensland	Social Media Manager	Winner
Rachel Boothman	22	Western Australia	Promotions Assistant	Runner-Up
Jemma Umlauf	21	South Australia	Radiology Assistant	Episode 11
Frankie Copas	23	New South Wales	HR Administrator	Episode 8
Rebecca Wray	21	Western Australia	Nurse	Episode 7
Breanna Todkill	26	New South Wales	Town Planning Administrator	Episode 5
Emily Steinberg	24	Queensland	Indigenous Health Worker	Episode 3
Bridgette Fox	21	Victoria	Speech Pathologist	Episode 1
Chloe Scott	20	Queensland	Student Nurse	Episode 1
Grace Tranent	22	Queensland	Primary School Teacher	Episode 1

=== David's dates ===
Name	Age	Hometown	Occupation	Eliminated
Emily Gordon	26	Queensland	Special Education Aide	Winner
Lorelei Bates	26	Queensland	Marketing Coordinator	Runner-Up
Alyssa Wynants	32	Queensland	Disability Support Worker	Episode 11
Leah Burgess	27	Queensland	Paediatric Nurse	Episode 9 (quit)
Jessie Newman	30	Queensland	Naturopath	Episode 7
Elle Stubbings	30	New South Wales	Recruitment Manager	Episode 5
Emma Reeves	29	New South Wales	Marketing Director	Episode 3 (quit)
Cassandra Mass	30	New South Wales	Public Servant	Episode 2
Lily Johnsom	23	New South Wales	Florist	Episode 2
Olivia Dove	26	New South Wales	Registered Nurse	Episode 2

=== Matt's dates ===
Name	Age	Hometown	Occupation	Eliminated
Olivia Benic	24	New South Wales	Admin Officer	Winner
Annabelle Greenaway	22	New South Wales	Hospitality Team Leader	Runner-Up
Chelsea Boothman	22	Western Australia	Marketing Assistant	Episode 11
Madelon McDonald	22	Victoria	Dressage Rider	Episode 9
Demi Najinski	22	Queensland	Sports Management Student	Episode 7
Alice Paterson	22	Tasmania	Teaching Assistant	Episode 5
Madison Gielen	22	Western Australia	Professional Equestrian	Episode 3
Courtney	24	Western Australia	Optical Assistant	Episode 1
Georgia Pynee	22	Queensland	Student Nurse	Episode 1
Jenna Sanders	21	Western Australia	Horticulturist	Episode 1

== Ratings ==
No.	Title	Air date	Timeslot	Overnight ratings		Ref(s)
No.	Title	Air date	Timeslot	Viewers	Rank	Ref(s)
1	Episode 1	10 April 2023	Monday 7:00pm	677,000	5	
2	Episode 2	11 April 2023	Tuesday 7:30pm	595,000	6	
3	Episode 3	12 April 2023	Wednesday 7:30pm	567,000	6	
4	Episode 4	16 April 2023	Sunday 7:00pm	648,000	3	
5	Episode 5	17 April 2023	Monday 7:30pm	604,000	7	
6	Episode 6	18 April 2023	Tuesday 7:30pm	565,000	7	
7	Episode 7	23 April 2023	Sunday 7:00pm	625,000	3	
8	Episode 8	25 April 2023	Tuesday 7:30pm	554,000	9	
9	Episode 9	30 April 2023	Sunday 7:00pm	598,000	6	
10	Episode 10	1 May 2023	Monday 7:30pm	637,000	6	
11	Episode 11	7 May 2023	Sunday 7:00pm	657,000	5	
12	Episode 12	9 May 2023	Tuesday 7:30pm	584,000	7	
13	Final Part 1	14 May 2023	Sunday 7:00pm	722,000	3	
14	Final Part 2	21 May 2023	Sunday 7:00pm	762,000	3	
15	Reunion	22 May 2023	Monday 7:30pm	697,000	6	
