= Endless (The McClymonts album) =

Studio album by The McClymonts
- Released: 13 January 2017
- Recorded: 2016
- Genre: Country
- Length: 39:54
- Label: Universal
- Producer: Andy Mak

The McClymonts chronology
Here's to You & I (2014)	Endless (2017)	Mayhem to Madness (2020)

Singles from Here's To You & I
- 1. "House" Released: 7 October 2016; 2. "Don't Wish It All Away" Released: April 2017; 3. "Don't Wish It All Away" Released: March 2018

Endless is the fifth studio album by Australian country band, the McClymonts, released in Australia on 13 January 2017 by Universal Records and peaking at No. 3 on the ARIA Albums Chart.

Mollie McClymonts commented on the album title saying "Endless reflects how we're feeling about our lives right now and our love and dedication to our family and also for music. We will be doing this forever – that's our plan."

At the 2018 Country Music Awards of Australia, Endless won awards for Country Music Album of the Year and Contemporary Country Album of the Year.

== Track listing ==
All tracks are written by Brooke McClymont, Mollie McClymont, and Samantha McClymont, with additional writers noted.

Endless track listing
No.	Title	Writer(s)	Length
1.	"Like We Used To"	Jordan Mohilowski; Dan Ostebo	3:20
2.	"House"	Sarah Aarons; Michael Fatkin	3:21
3.	"Nothing Good Comes Easy"	Andrew Macken; Thomas Macken	3:46
4.	"Endless"	Nick Brophy; Jennifer Hanson	3:48
5.	"Chain Smoker"	Fatkin	3:45
6.	"Let You Down"	Fatkin	3:04
7.	"When We Say It's Forever" (featuring Ronan Keating)	A. Macken; T. Macken	3:43
8.	"Unsaveable"	Fatkin	4:20
9.	"Judge You"	Fatkin	3:34
10.	"Don't Wish It All Away"	Lindsey Jackson	3:56
11.	"Bad for Us"		3:10
Total length:			39:54

== Personnel ==
The McClymonts

- Brooke McClymont – vocals
- Mollie McClymont – vocals
- Samantha McClymont – vocals

Additional musicians

- Andy Mak – keyboards (tracks 1–6), programming (1–4, 7–10), bass guitar (3, 9–11), organ (5, 6, 8, 11), piano (7, 8, 10, 11), drums (9), percussion (11)
- Thom Macken – guitar (tracks 1–6, 8–11), violin (7)
- Harrison Wood – drums (drums 1–6, 8, 10)
- David Holmes – guitar (tracks 1, 3–6, 8–10)
- Jordan Brady – mandolin (tracks 2, 4–6, 9, 11), programming (8)
- Ben Whincop – bass guitar (tracks 2, 4–6)
- Jackson Barclay – programming (tracks 5, 6), cello (7)
- Ronan Keating – vocals (track 7)

Technical

- Andy Mak – production, mixing, engineering (all tracks); string arrangement (track 7)
- Jackson Barclay – mixing (track 1), engineering (all tracks)
- Josh Telford – engineering (tracks 1–6, 8–10)
- Rob Agostini – engineering (track 7)

== Charts ==
=== Weekly charts ===
Chart (2017)	Peak position
Australian Albums (ARIA)	3

=== Year-end charts ===
Chart (2017)	Position
Australia Country Albums (ARIA)	8
