= Chaos and Bright Lights =

Studio album by The McClymonts
- Released: 12 November 2007 (Australia); 17 August 2010 (U.S.)
- Recorded: February 2007 – August 2007
- Genre: Country
- Label: Universal
- Producer: Adam Anders

The McClymonts chronology
The McClymonts (2006)	Chaos and Bright Lights (2007)	Wrapped Up Good (2010)

Singles from Chaos and Bright Lights
- 1. "Save Yourself" Released: 22 October 2007; 2. "My Life Again" Released: November 2007; 3. "Finally Over Blue" Released: 19 May 2008; 4. "Shotgun" Released: 14 August 2008; 5. "Favourite Boyfriend of the Year" Released: 3 December 2008

Professional ratings
Review scores
Source	Rating
Country HQ	(positive) link
Citysearch	(not rated) link

Chaos and Bright Lights is the first studio album by Australian country band The McClymonts released in Australia on 10 November 2007 (see 2007 in music) by Universal Records. The band co-wrote most of the songs on the album with help from many writers including the album's producer Adam Anders. The singles released from the album gave the band little success on the charts with "Save Yourself" peaking in the Australian ARIA Singles Chart top hundred and "My Life Again" debuting in the top twenty on the CMC top thirty.

Band member Brooke McClymont stated that the album has many moods and the songs present a young woman's outlook on keeping, finding and losing relationships. The band wrote all the songs for the album in both Nashville and Australia with some national and international songwriters including – Monty Powell (who writes for Keith Urban), Eric Silver (who has written for Dixie Chicks), Trey Bruce (who has written for Diamond Rio, LeAnn Rimes), Nathan Chapman (who has written for Taylor Swift), Steve Diamond (who has written for Lonestar, Lee Greenwood), and Frank Myers.

"Save Yourself" was the first song released from the album, to radio on 3 September 2007 and to CD single on 22 October 2007.

In 2014, the album was certified gold in Australia.

== Track listing ==
1. "My Life Again" (Adam Anders, Nathan Chapman, Brooke McClymont) – 3:22
2. "Save Yourself" (Anders, Trey Bruce, McClymont) – 3:35
3. "Don't Tie My Hands" (Steve Diamond, McClymont, Mollie McClymont) – 4:13
4. "Good Cry" (McClymont, McClymont, Samantha McClymont, Monty Powell, Eric Silver) – 3:47
5. "Settle Down" (B. McClymont, Erinn Sherlock) – 4:21
6. "Way Too Late" (McClymont, McClymont, McClymont, Rod McCormack) – 3:09
7. "You Were Right" (B. McClymont, Sherlock) – 3:48
8. "Shotgun" (McClymont, McClymont, McClymont) – 3:43
9. "Favourite Boyfriend of the Year" (Anders, McClymont, McClymont, McClymont) – 3:20
10. "Finally Over Blue" (A. Herickson, L, Kittilsen, B. McClymont, J. Schumann) – 4:00
11. "Til You Love Me" (Anders, S. McClymont, Frank Myers) – 3:58
12. "Ghost Town" (M. McClymont, S. McClymont, Sherlock) – 2:53

== Charts ==
=== Weekly charts ===
Chart (2007)	Peak position
Australian Albums (ARIA)	37
Chart (2010)	Peak position
U.S. Billboard Top Country Albums	73

=== Year-end charts ===
Chart (2007)	Position
Australia Country Albums (ARIA)	24
Chart (2008)	Position
Australia Country Albums (ARIA)	16
Chart (2009)	Position
Australia Country Albums (ARIA)	36

== Certifications ==
Region	Certification	Certified units/sales
Australia (ARIA)	Gold	35,000^{^}
^{^} Shipments figures based on certification alone.
