= I Don't Think, I Know =

Single by Brooke McClymont
- B-side: "Take You with Me"
- Released: 2 December 2002 (Australia)
- Recorded: 2002
- Genre: Country rock
- Length: 3:35
- Label: Universal
- Songwriter(s): Brooke McClymont, Clive Young
- Producer(s): Charles Fisher

Brooke McClymont singles chronology
"I Can't Wait" (2002)	"I Don't Think, I Know" (2002)

"I Don't Think, I Know" is a pop country song written by Brooke McClymont and Clive Young, produced by Charles Fisher for McClymont's second single released in Australia on 2 December 2002 as a CD single. It became McClymont's highest selling solo single to date peaking at number forty-five on the Australian ARIA Singles Chart and spending fourteen weeks in the top one hundred.

== Track listing ==
1. "I Don't Think, I Know" – 3:35
2. "I Don't Think, I Know" (re-mix) – 3:15
3. "I Don't Think, I Know" (acoustic) – 3:47
4. "Take You with Me" – 4:28

== Charts ==
Chart (2002–2003)	Peak position
Australia (ARIA)	45
