= I Can't Wait (Brooke McClymont song) =

2002 song by Brooke McClymont

Single by Brooke McClymont
- B-side: "It's Not Worth It"
- Released: 17 June 2002 (Australia)
- Recorded: Australia, 2002
- Genre: Pop rock
- Length: 3:57
- Label: Universal
- Songwriters: Brooke McClymont, Christopher Ward, Matthew Gerrard
- Producer: Charles Fisher

Brooke McClymont singles chronology
"I Can't Wait" (2002)	"I Don't Think, I Know" (2002)

"I Can't Wait" is a contemporary rock song written by Brooke McClymont, Christopher Ward and Matthew Gerrard. McClymont recorded the song as her debut single; it was released in Australia on 17 June 2002 as a CD single and peaked at number forty-nine on the Australian ARIA Singles Chart. McClymont chose the song to be her debut single because she felt it is a really positive song and shows her personality.

== Music video ==
The video was directed by Sam Rebillet. It opens with Brooke McClymont walking down the street holding a guitar, and she goes inside a building and walks up the stairs. She then sits on a windowsill playing the guitar. When McClymont is singing with the guitar a girl with black hair and pigtails, played by McClymont, walks in a crowded hall and people crash into her. The girl looks at her phone and into the distance. During the first chorus McClymont is playing the guitar with her band. At the second verse the girl crashes into a man with a red shirt on and brown hair, who then follows her. When the second chorus begins McClymont plays the guitar, and the girl sits down on a chair in a train station. The train turns up and the man gets on. When the doors start closing the girl throws the man her phone and then makes hand movements saying "I'll call you". The video was played a few times on the Australian music shows Video Hits and rage.

== Charts ==
Chart (2002)	Peak position
Australia (ARIA)	49

== Hilary Duff version ==
"I Can't Wait"

Single by Hilary Duff

from the album Lizzie McGuire
- Released: August 12, 2002
- Recorded: July 2002
- Genre: Pop rock
- Length: 3:12
- Label: Walt Disney
- Songwriters: Brooke McClymont; Christopher Ward; Matthew Gerrard
- Producer: Matthew Gerrard

Hilary Duff singles chronology
"I Can't Wait" (2002)	"Santa Claus Lane" (2002)

Audio video
- "I Can't Wait" on YouTube

Hilary Duff recorded a cover version of "I Can't Wait" in 2002 for the soundtrack to the Disney Channel series Lizzie McGuire, in which she starred. It was released to mainstream pop radio stations on August 12, 2002.

=== Music video ===
Its music video features clips from the show alongside shots of Duff dancing, holding a guitar, and singing, with soap bubbles and confetti floating around her, and she also performs the song in a mock studio setting. A remix of the song is featured on the "Why Not" (2003) CD single. A music video was also released for the remix.

== Chieko Kawabe version ==
In 2005, the song was rewritten in Japanese and performed by Chieko Kawabe on her album Brilliance. It was for the Japanese version of Lizzie McGuire.
