= Lizzie McGuire (soundtrack) =

Soundtrack album by Various artists
- Released: August 13, 2002
- Genre: Pop
- Label: Walt Disney
- Producer: Various artists

Singles from Lizzie McGuire
- 1. "I Can't Wait" Released: August 12, 2002

Lizzie McGuire is the soundtrack to the television series of the same name. The album is a collection of hits by various artists, used as background music in the show or inspired by it. It also includes the show's theme song and a song by Hilary Duff, the actress who plays Lizzie. This was Hilary's music debut. It has sold 1,000,000 copies in the U.S and was certified Platinum by the RIAA. The album's single, "I Can't Wait" was serviced to radio on August 12.

== Track listing ==
1. "I Can't Wait" - Hilary Duff
2. "Why Can't We Be Friends?" - Smash Mouth
3. "All I Can Do" - Jump5
4. "Us Against the World" - Play
5. "Irresistible" - Jessica Simpson
6. "ABC" - Jackson 5
7. "Everybody Wants Ya" - S Club 7
8. "Start the Commotion" - The Wiseguys
9. "Walk Me Home" - Mandy Moore
10. "What They Gonna Think" - Fan 3
11. "Have a Nice Life" - Dana Dawson
12. "We'll Figure It Out (Theme Song)" - Angie Jaree

== Charts ==
=== Weekly charts ===
Chart (2002–2003)	Peak position
US Billboard 200	31
US Soundtrack Albums (Billboard)	2

=== Year-end charts ===
Chart (2003)	Position
US Billboard 200	105
US Soundtrack Albums (Billboard)	5

== Certifications ==
Region	Certification	Certified units/Sales
United States (RIAA)	Platinum	1,000,000
