= Wrapped Up Good =

Studio album by The McClymonts
- Released: 26 January 2010 (Australia); 23 August 2011 (U.S.)
- Genre: Country
- Label: Universal
- Producer: Adam Anders

The McClymonts chronology
| Chaos and Bright Lights (2007) | Wrapped Up Good (2010) | Two Worlds Collide (2012) |

Singles from Wrapped Up Good
- 1. "Kick It Up"; 2. "Wrapped Up Good"; 3. "Hearts on Fire"; 4. "A Woman is a Flame"; 5. "I Could Be a Cowboy"

Wrapped Up Good is the second studio album by Australian country band The McClymonts released in Australia on 26 January 2010 by Universal Records.

The album entered the Australian music chart at Number 2 and remained on the chart for 14 weeks.

Wrapped Up Good was awarded Best Country Album at the 2010 ARIA Awards.

The McClymonts went on to win Group or Duo of the Year for Wrapped Up Good at the 2011 Country Music Awards of Australia.

== Reception ==
The album received positive reviews across several markets. Allmusic concluded that "Wrapped Up Good stands as one fierce choice for dominating radio waves". It was given a rating of. The Border Mail said "the title track is power-pop country at its best". Rave magazine noted "if you like perfectly arranged country-radio MOR, you’ll love this".

== Track listing ==
1. "Kick It Up" (Brooke McClymont, Trey Bruce) – 3:00
2. "Wrapped Up Good" (B. McClymont, Samantha McClymont, Mollie McClymont, Nathan Chapman) – 3:42
3. "He Used to Love Me" (B. McClymont, M. McClymont, Matt Nolan) – 3:45
4. "Boy Who Cried Love" (B. McClymont, Erinn Sherlock) – 3:13
5. "Take It Back" (McClymont, McClymont, McClymont, Chapman) – 3:39
6. "Rock the Boat" (B. McClymont, Reed Vertelney, Lindy Robbins) – 4:34
7. "I'm Not Done With You Just Yet" (McClymont, McClymont, McClymont, Leslie Satchet) – 3:50
8. "A Woman Is a Flame" (S. McClymont, M. McClymont, Sherlock) – 3:44
9. "Hearts on Fire" (McClymont, McClymont, McClymont, Patrick Davis) – 3:33
10. "If You're Gonna Love Me" (Adam Anders, Tommy Lee James) – 3:23
11. "I Could Be a Cowboy" (McClymont, McClymont, McClymont, Chapman) – 3:37
12. "Cannonball" (B. McClymont, Sherlock) – 2:50

== Charts ==
=== Weekly charts ===
| Chart (2010) | Peak position |
|---|---|
| Australian Albums (ARIA) | 2 |

=== Year-end charts ===
| Chart (2010) | Position |
|---|---|
| Australia Country Albums (ARIA) | 5 |
| Chart (2011) | Position |
| Australia Country Albums (ARIA) | 30 |

== Certifications ==
| Region | Certification | Certified units/sales |
|---|---|---|
| Australia (ARIA) | Gold | 35,000^{^} |
^{^} Shipments figures based on certification alone.
