= Two Worlds Collide (album) =

Studio album by The McClymonts
- Released: 18 May 2012 (Australia)
- Recorded: 2011–2012
- Genre: Country
- Length: 63.55
- Label: Universal
- Producer: Nathan Chapman

The McClymonts chronology
Wrapped Up Good (2010)	Two Worlds Collide (2012)	Here's To You & I (2014)

Singles from Two Worlds Collide
- 1. "How Long Have You Known" Released: 20 January 2012; 2. "Piece of Me" Released: 4 June 2012; 3. "Little Old Beat Up Heart" Released: 3 September 2012; 4. "It Aint Over" Released: 17 October 2012

Two Worlds Collide is the third studio album by Australian country band The McClymonts, released in Australia on 18 May 2012 by Universal Records. It won at the 2012 ARIA Music Awards for Best Country Album.

== Critical reception ==
The first single from Two Worlds Collide, "How Long Have You Known" on YouTube, went to number one on the Australian Country Music chart and the CMC Video Chart in the first week of April 2012. The song is based on a relationship of songwriter Andrew Dorff.

== Track listing ==
1. "Two Worlds Collide"
2. "The Easy Part"
3. "Everybody's Looking to Fall in Love"
4. "Piece of Me"
5. "Sweet"
6. "Where You Are"
7. "Little Old Beat Up Heart"
8. "Those Summer Days"
9. "How Long Have You Known"
10. "This Ain't Over"
11. "Feel Like Going Home"

== Charts ==
=== Weekly charts ===
Chart (2012)	Peak position
Australian Albums (ARIA)	7

=== Year-end charts ===
Chart (2012)	Position
Australia Country Albums (ARIA)	12
