= The Farmer Wants a Wife (Australian TV series) =

- 2016 logo
- Genre: Reality
- Presented by: Natalie Gruzlewski (2007–2012, 2020–2022, 2025–); Sam McClymont (2016); Sam Armytage (2023–2024)
- Opening theme: "Lovin' Each Day" by Ronan Keating (2007–2009); "Love Story" by Taylor Swift (2010); "Haven't Met You Yet" by Michael Bublé (2011); "Feel So Close" by Calvin Harris (2012); "Want to Want Me" by Jason Derulo (2016)
- Country of origin: Australia
- Original language: English
- No. of seasons: 16
- No. of episodes: 104

Production
- Producers: FremantleMedia Australia (2007–2012, 2016); Fremantle Australia (2020–present); Eureka Productions (2020–present)
- Running time: 60 minutes (including commercials)

Original release
- Network: Nine Network
- Release: 24 October 2007 – 26 September 2012
- Release: 1 February – 14 March 2016
- Network: Seven Network
- Release: 26 July 2020 – present

The Farmer Wants a Wife is an Australian reality television series based on the British reality show Farmer Wants a Wife. The first eight seasons, hosted by Natalie Gruzlewski, aired on the Nine Network between 2007 and 2012. A ninth season, hosted by Sam McClymont, aired in 2016. A tenth season aired on the Seven Network when the series was revived for the second time in 2020. Applications are currently open for a 2027 series.

== Production ==
=== Nine Network iteration (2007–12, 2016) ===
The series was commissioned by Nine Network and the first season premiered on 24 October 2007. Nine aired eight seasons from 2007 to 2012 before it was eventually cancelled. In May 2015, Nine Network announced the series would be revived for a ninth season. Hosted by Sam McClymont, it premiered on 1 February 2016. Nine chose not to further renew the show.

=== Seven Network iteration (2020–present) ===
In October 2019, it was reported that the Seven Network had commissioned a new season of the show, on 23 October 2019, the series was officially confirmed for revival by Seven at their 2020 Upfronts. In December 2019, Natalie Gruzlewski announced she would be returning as series host. The tenth season began airing on 26 July 2020. The title dropped the leading 'The', giving the show the same name as the original British version.

In August 2020, the series was renewed by Seven Network for a second season for 2021, making it the 11th season all up, Gruzlewski returned as host. The eleventh season began airing on 4 July 2021. In July 2021, the series was renewed by Seven Network for a third season for 2022 (being that of the twelfth season overall) which began airing on 4 September 2022, with Gruzlewski as host. In October 2022, the series was renewed for a fourth season (13th overall) by Seven. In February 2023, it was announced Sam Armytage will co-host the series alongside Gruzlewski. In October 2023, the series was renewed for a fifth season (14th overall) by Seven. In February 2024, the first promo was aired which also revealed the farmers. The 2024 season will air on 14 April 2024.

The fourteenth series was Armytage's last series as host as she signed with the Nine Network in October 2024. Gruzlewski will return as host in 2025. The farmers and their dates were revealed in April 2025, along with the season fifteenth premiere date of 21 April 2025.

== Series overview ==
Series overview for Farmer Wants A Wife
Series	Episodes	Originally released			Average Viewers	Average Rank
Series	Episodes	First released	Last released	Network	Average Viewers	Average Rank
1	6	24 October 2007	28 November 2007	Nine Network	1,250,000	6
2	6	30 June 2008	4 August 2008	Nine Network	1,381,000	8
3	8	11 February 2009	1 April 2009	Nine Network	1,207,000	6
4	8	3 August 2009	14 September 2009	Nine Network	1,191,000	8
5	8	28 July 2010	15 September 2010	Nine Network	1,247,000	8
6	8	9 February 2011	30 March 2011	Nine Network	914,000	9
7	8	22 August 2011	3 October 2011	Nine Network	975,000	7
8	9	15 August 2012	26 September 2012	Nine Network	895,000	10
9	8	1 February 2016	14 March 2016	Nine Network	662,000	15
10	10	26 July 2020	24 August 2020	Seven Network	895,000	5
11	13	4 July 2021	21 July 2021	Seven Network	787,000	7
12	13	4 September 2022	4 October 2022	Seven Network	574,000	8
13	15	10 April 2023	22 May 2023	Seven Network	633,000	6
14	19	14 April 2024	26 May 2024	Seven Network	TBA	TBA
15	19	21 April 2025	23 June 2025	Seven Network	TBA	TBA
16	TBA	8 June 2026	TBA	Seven Network	TBA	TBA

== Farmers ==
Number of farmers home states
States	Series															Total (by state)
States	1	2	3	4	5	6	7	8	9	10	11	12	13	14	15	Total (by state)
New South Wales	4	4	3	2	1	2			1	2	3	3	3	3	1	32
Queensland				3		1				2			1	2	2	13
South Australia		1			1				2						1	8
Victoria	2	1		2	1		2		1		2	2	1	1		19
Western Australia			1		3	1		2	1							8
Tasmania			1					1		1						3
Total	6	6	6	7	6	6	6	6	6	5	5	5	5	6	4	84

== Seasons ==
=== Season 1 (2007) ===
Farmer	Age	Location	Quote
Drew	32	Mudgee, NSW	"I have a cheeky nature... the lovable brat. There is never a dull moment in my life."
Brad	30	Swan Hill, Vic	"Really I'd like to settle down with a woman who's not so ready and wants to share her journey with me."
Gus	32	Warren, NSW	"I come from a close and happy family and firmly believe this has made me the happy confident person I am today."
Jon	28	Deniliquin, NSW	"I hope to find a person with an easy going nature to share the good and bad times together."
Craig	27	West Wyalong, NSW	"I am looking for a girl that would be with me for the right reason; start a new life and then see where we would end up."
Chris	34	Tamworth, NSW	"You get a long way in life with a smile and a friend, someone who can laugh at themselves."

=== Season 2 (2008) ===
Farmer	Age	Location	Quote
Rob	42	Mount Gambier, SA	"It hasn't all been easy, but the most difficult part is having no partner to share it all with."
James	36	Deniliquin, NSW	"Once I enter a relationship with someone I am intensely loyal."
Mick	24	Goulburn, NSW	"My female friends describe me as the perfect catch for any lady."
Howie	29	Weabonga, NSW	"I have a fair amount of determination. I need someone with equal or more amounts to keep me in line and to handle country life."
Ben	30	Jamberoo, NSW	"I'm now ready for someone to settle with and share what I have with me."
Nick	27	Wahgunyah, Vic	"I pride myself as a bit of a gentlemen – that is the way I have been brought up."

=== Season 3 (2009) ===
Farmer	Age	Location	Quote
Jenny Blake	32	Tumbarumba, NSW	"I'm into serious relationships, not casual flings or time wasters."
Andrew Hall	25	Manoora, SA	"I like to brighten someone's day when they are down."
Paul McDonald	36	Tarcutta, NSW	"I am not afraid to show affection in public."
Ralph Lyster	29	Mandurah, WA	"The Playboy farmer"
Tim Farr	26	Mulwala, NSW	"The good looking one"
Damian Atkins	29	Caveside, Tas	"the Tasmanian"

=== Season 4 (2009) ===
Farmer	Age	Location	Note
Brad Crane	29	Lithgow, NSW	—N/a
Scott Warby	28	Mungindi, NSW	—N/a
Russell Macgugan	27	Grampians, Vic	—N/a
Nate Cahill	37	Goovigenm Qld	—N/a
Phil Newton	42	Mansfield, Vic	—N/a
Gavin Phalke	49	Norwell, Qld	Gavin & Steven are Father & Son
Steven Phalke	27	Norwell, Qld	Gavin & Steven are Father & Son

=== Season 5 (2010) ===
Farmer	Age	Location
Becky Cassanova	34	SA
Devon Mill	25	Hopetoun, Vic
Jamie Morgan	40	Monkey Mia, WA
Charlie Norton	25	Walcha, NSW
Nathan McClymont	26	Wiluna, WA
Shaun Fewson	31	Nyabing, WA

=== Season 6 (2011) ===
Farmer	Age	Location
Nick Carey	26	Gordon, Vic
Melia Brent-White	30	Margaret River, WA
Charles Roche	32	Barraba, NSW
Ben Wandel	33	Clare, SA
Kieran Davidson	24	Young, NSW
Mark MacLaughlin	27	Mareeba, Qld

=== Season 7 (2011) ===
Farmer	Age	Location
Trent Walker	24	Lameroo, SA
Will PoppCollar	25	Warialda, NSW
Tim Eichler	29	Murrayville, Vic
Frank Atherton	32	Hughenden, Qld
Kevin Martin	33	Maryborough, Vic
John McLonely	58	Merriwa, NSW

=== Season 8 (2012) ===
Farmer	Age	Location
Nikko	26	Richmond, Qld
Matt	26	Waubra, Vic
Todd	28	Bruny Island, Tas
Tom	31	Beeac, Vic
Sam	33	Kununurra, WA
Paul	46	Gnaraloo, WA

=== Season 9 (2016) ===
Farmer		Age	Location
Adam	Dairy	25	Drouin South, Vic
Matt	Cattle	25	Marble Bar, WA
Lachlan	Beef Cattle & Hay	36	Camden, NSW
Julz	Mixed & Livestock	36	Tumby Bay, SA
Jedd	Oysters	37	Coffin Bay, SA
Lance	Cattle	52	Rockhampton, Qld

=== Season 10 (2020) ===
Original run	Farmer	Profile	Winner	Runner(s)-up	Still Together	Notes
26 July – 24 August 2020
26 July – 24 August 2020	Alex Taylor	Age: 29; Location: Cunnamulla, Qld; Profession: Sheep & Cattle Farmer	Jess Wolfe	Henrietta Moore	No	Farmer Alex initially chose to enter into a relationship with Jess, however he broke up with her after a few weeks. Taylor proceeded to rekindle his relationship with Henrietta. The pair confirmed their separation in October 2020.
26 July – 24 August 2020	Harry Robertson	Age: 29; Location: Goolgowi, NSW; Profession: Grape, Cotton & Sheep Farmer	Stacey Cain	Madison MacKenzie	No	Farmer Harry chose to enter into a relationship with Stacey. During the reunion episode, the couple shared the news of their break-up.
26 July – 24 August 2020	Neil Seaman	Age: 43; Location: Crookwell, NSW; Profession: Merino Sheep Farmer	Justine Adams	Karissa Godfrey	No	Farmer Neil chose to enter into a relationship with Justine. The couple split in November 2020.
26 July – 24 August 2020	Nick Onassis	Age: 44; Location: Deviot, TAS; Profession: Vineyard Worker	Liz Jelléy	Naomi Carter	No	Farmer Nick chose to enter into a relationship with Liz. During the reunion episode, the couple announced they had split.
26 July – 24 August 2020	Sam Reitano	Age: 28; Location: Innisfail, Qld; Profession: Tropical Fruit Farmer	—N/a	—N/a	—N/a	Farmer Sam quit the show and ended his journey to find love early after the death of his grandfather.

=== Season 11 (2021) ===
Original run	Farmer	Profile	Winner	Runner(s)-up	Still Together	Notes
4 July – 21 July 2021
4 July – 21 July 2021	Andrew Guthrie	Age: 30; Location: Delegate, NSW; Profession: Sheep Farmer	Jessica Nathan	Ashleigh Adams	Yes	Farmer Andrew chose to enter into a relationship with Jess. The couple announced their engagement on 7 August 2023.
4 July – 21 July 2021	Matt Trewin	Age: 26; Location: Orbost, VIC; Profession: Beef & Fodder Farmer	Tara Hurl	Alex Uffindell	No	Farmer Matt chose to enter into a relationship with Tara. During the reunion episode, the couple announced they had gone their separate ways.
4 July – 21 July 2021	Rob Campbell	Age: 40; Location: Snowy Mountains, NSW; Profession: Sheep & Cattle Farmer	—N/a	Kate; Vici	—N/a	Farmer Rob struggled to find a romantic connection with Vici or Kate and ultimately decided to send them both home, leaving him single.
4 July – 21 July 2021	Sam Messina	Age: 25; Location: Orange, NSW; Profession: Sheep & Crop Farmer	—N/a	Allanah Taranto; Mackenzie Phillips	—N/a	Farmer Sam decided to end his relationships with Allanah and Mackenzie during the Black Tie Dinner, ending his journey to find love.
4 July – 21 July 2021	Will Dwyer	Age: 39; Location: Longwood, VIC; Profession: Sheep & Cattle Farmer	Jaimee	Kristina	No	Farmer Will chose to enter into a relationship with Jaimee. The pair quietly split after it was revealed Dwyer was set to father a child with contestant Hayley Love. Dwyer has chosen to not have a relationship with his daughter.

=== Season 12 (2022) ===
Original run	Farmer	Profile	Winner	Runner(s)-up	Still Together	Notes
4 September – 4 October 2022
4 September – 4 October 2022	Ben Scowen	Age: 27; Location: Wingham, NSW; Profession: Dairy Farmer	Aleisha Mackail	Kiani Olsen	No	Farmer Ben chose to enter into a relationship with Leish. On 6 October 2022, the couple announced they had split.
4 September – 4 October 2022	Benjamin Jackson	Age: 33; Location: Guyra, NSW; Profession: Sheep Farmer	—N/a	—N/a	—N/a	Farmer Benjamin temporarily left the show after the death of his grandmother. While away, he was diagnosed with an undisclosed illness that forced him to exit the show for good. After filming wrapped, Jackson reconnected with Hannah Gracey, and the couple are still together as of October 2026.
4 September – 4 October 2022	Harry Lloyd	Age: 24; Location: Kyabram, VIC; Profession: Sheep & Cattle Farmer	Tess Brookman	Bronte Dunne	Yes	Farmer Harry chose to enter into a relationship with Tess. They are still together as of October 2026.
4 September – 4 October 2022	Paige Marsh	Age: 28; Location: Cassilis, NSW; Profession: Sheep & Cattle Farmer	—N/a	Ayden Holmes; Cody Luff	—N/a	In the penultimate episode, Farmer Paige decided to end her relationships with both Ayden and Cody, ending her journey to find love.
4 September – 4 October 2022	Will Simpson	Age: 27; Location: Berriwillock, VIC; Profession: Crop & Sheep Farmer	Jessica Cova	Madi Simpson	Yes	Farmer Will chose to enter into a relationship with Jess. They are still together as of October 2026.

=== Season 13 (2023) ===
Original run	Farmer	Profile	Winner	Runner(s)-up	Still Together	Notes
8 April – 22 May 2023
8 April – 22 May 2023	Andrew Coleman	Age: 41; Location: Narromine, NSW; Profession: Crop & Sheep Farmer	Claire Saunders	Jessie Noble; Sarah Roach	No	In episode 9, Farmer Andrew decided to send Jessie and Sarah home after developing strong feelings for Claire. They began a relationship, but confirmed on 21 October 2024 that they were no longer together.
8 April – 22 May 2023	Brad Jones	Age: 33; Location: Cootamundra, NSW; Profession: Crop & Cattle Farmer	Clare Hockings	Morgan Gibbons	Yes	Farmer Brad chose to enter into a relationship with Clare. In December 2023, they became parents to a baby boy. They are still together as of October 2026.
8 April – 22 May 2023	Brenton Kuch	Age: 26; Location: Darriman, VIC; Profession: Sheep & Cattle Farmer	Sophie Holcombe	Rachel Boothman	No	Farmer Brenton chose to enter into a relationship with Sophie. On 1 August 2023, Holcombe announced the couple had gone their separate ways.
8 April – 22 May 2023	David McMahon	Age: 29; Location: Pozieres, Qld; Profession: Apple Farmer	Emily Gordon	Lorelei Bates	Yes	Farmer David chose to enter into a relationship with Emily. On 2 October 2023, the couple announced their engagement.
8 April – 22 May 2023	Matt Young	Age: 23; Location: Bookham, NSW; Profession: Sheep & Cattle Farmer	Olivia Benic	Annabelle Greenaway	Yes	Farmer Matt chose to enter into a relationship with Olivia. In August 2024, they became the parents of a baby boy. They are still together as of October 2026.

=== Season 14 (2024) ===
Original run	Farmer	Profile	Winner	Runner(s)-up	Still Together	Notes						
14 April – 26 May 2024
14 April – 26 May 2024	Bert Harris	Age: 30; Location: Wamuran, Qld; Profession: Pineapple & Dragon Fruit farmer	—N/a	Brooke McCallum; Karli Hinkley; Caitlin Crank	—N/a	In Episode 15, Farmer Bert decided to end his relationships with Brooke, Karli, and Caitlin, ending his journey to find love.						
14 April – 26 May 2024	Joe Bobbin	Age: 33; Location: Bombala, NSW; Profession: Cattle & Sheep farmer	Sarah Carey	Keely McCarthy	No	Farmer Joe chose to enter into a relationship with Sarah. They are not together. Sarah announced their split in August 2024. She posted a song to her Instagram indicating it had been quite a painful breakdown.						
14 April – 26 May 2024	Dustin Manwaring	Age: 26; Location: Condobolin, NSW; Profession: Third generation farmer	Sophie Trethowan	Anna Wilson	Yes	Farmer Dustin chose to enter into a relationship with Sophie. They are still together as of October 2026.	Dean Blanckensee	Age: 25; Location: Kandanga, Qld; Profession: Cattle & Watermelon farmer	Teegan Barr	Bella Southwell; Tiffany Richardson	No	Farmer Dean chose to enter into a relationship with Teegan. During the reunion episode, the couple announced they had gone their separate ways.
14 April – 26 May 2024	Tom Boyer	Age: 22; Location: Tabilk, VIC; Profession: Cattle & Crop farmer	Sarah Cranley	Krissy Smith	No	Farmer Tom chose to enter into a relationship with Sarah. On 27 May 2024, Cranley announced they had gone their separate ways.						
14 April – 26 May 2024	Todd Melbourne	Age: 33; Location: Baan Baa, NSW; Profession: Cattle farmer	Daisy Lamb	Grace Jay	Yes	Farmer Todd chose to enter into a relationship with Daisy. They are still together as of October 2026.						

=== Season 15 (2025) ===
Original run	Farmer	Profile	Winner	Runner(s)-up	Still Together	Notes
21 April 2025 – 23 June 2025
21 April 2025 – 23 June 2025	Corey	Age: 24; Location: Biloela, Qld; Profession: Beans, hay and cotton farmer	Keeley	Chloe	Yes	
21 April 2025 – 23 June 2025	Jarrad	Age: 21; Location: Stanthorpe, Qld; Profession: Sheep farmer				
21 April 2025 – 23 June 2025	Thomas	Age: 35; Location: Kimba, SA; Profession: Wheat, barley and lentil farmer				
21 April 2025 – 23 June 2025	Tom	Age: 31; Location: Borambola, NSW; Profession: Sheep farmer				

=== Season 16 (2026) ===
Original run	Farmer	Profile	Winner	Runner(s)-up	Still Together	Notes
8 June 2026 –
8 June 2026 –	Jarrad	Age: 41; Location: Taylorville, South Australia; Profession: Almond farmer				
8 June 2026 –	Dylan	Age: 24; Location: Cherry Gardens, South Australia; Profession: Sheep farmer				
8 June 2026 –	Alex	Age: 28; Location: Kin Kin, Queensland; Profession: Cattle & Mushroom farmer				
8 June 2026 –	Jason	Age: 37; Location: Coolabunia, Queensland; Profession: Dairy farmer				
8 June 2026 –	John	Age: 37; Location: Mogumber, Western Australia; Profession: Cattle farmer				
8 June 2026 –	Zac	Age: 24; Location: Forest Range, South Australia; Profession: Apple farmer / Electrician				

== Series ratings ==
=== Season 1 (2007) ===
No.	Title	Air date	Overnight ratings		Ref(s)
No.	Title	Air date	Viewers	Rank	Ref(s)
1	Episode 1	24 October 2007	1,136,000	12	
2	Episode 2	31 October 2007	1,121,000	11	
3	Episode 3	7 November 2007	1,302,000	6	
4	Episode 4	14 November 2007	1,350,000	2	
5	Episode 5	21 November 2007	1,287,000	5	
6	Finale	28 November 2007	1,349,000	2	

=== Season 2 (2008) ===
No.	Title	Air date	Overnight ratings		Ref(s)
No.	Title	Air date	Viewers	Rank	Ref(s)
1	Episode 1	30 June 2008	1,267,000	11	
2	Episode 2	7 July 2008	1,270,000	9	
3	Episode 3	14 July 2008	1,373,000	7	
4	Episode 4	21 July 2008	1,184,000	14	
5	Episode 5	28 July 2008	1,492,000	5	
6	Episode 6	4 August 2008	1,700,000	2	

=== Season 3 (2009) ===
No.	Title	Air date	Overnight ratings		Ref(s)
No.	Title	Air date	Viewers	Rank	Ref(s)
1	Episode 1	11 February 2009	1,074,000	10	
2	Episode 2	18 February 2009	1,053,000	9	
3	Episode 3	25 February 2009	1,184,000	5	
4	Episode 4	4 March 2009	1,251,000	5	
5	Episode 5	11 March 2009	1,180,000	5	
6	Episode 6	18 March 2009	1,198,000	5	
7	Episode 7	25 March 2009	1,224,000	6	
8	Episode 8	1 April 2009	1,494,000	2	

=== Season 4 (2009) ===
No.	Title	Air date	Overnight ratings		Ref(s)
No.	Title	Air date	Viewers	Rank	Ref(s)
1	Episode 1	3 August 2009	1,001,000	11	
2	Episode 2	10 August 2009	1,125,000	12	
3	Episode 3	17 August 2009	1,180,000	9	
4	Episode 4	24 August 2009	1,169,000	8	
5	Episode 5	31 August 2009	1,114,000	10	
6	Episode 6	7 September 2009	1,257,000	7	
7	Episode 7	14 September 2009	1,263,000	6	
8	Finale	14 September 2009	1,422,000	3	

=== Season 5 (2010) ===
No.	Title	Air date	Overnight ratings		Ref(s)
No.	Title	Air date	Viewers	Rank	Ref(s)
1	Episode 1	28 July 2010	1,192,000	9	
2	Episode 2	4 August 2010	1,343,000	6	
3	Episode 3	11 August 2010	1,218,000	8	
4	Episode 4	18 August 2010	1,262,000	8	
5	Episode 5	25 August 2010	1,020,000	16	
6	Episode 6	1 September 2010	1,273,000	7	
7	Episode 7	8 September 2010	1,221,000	7	
8	Episode 8	15 September 2010	1,450,000	1	

=== Season 6 (2011) ===
No.	Title	Air date	Overnight ratings		Ref(s)
No.	Title	Air date	Viewers	Rank	Ref(s)
1	Episode 1	9 February 2011	891,000	9	
2	Episode 2	16 February 2011	887,000	11	
3	Episode 3	23 February 2011	786,000	11	
4	Episode 4	2 March 2011	925,000	8	
5	Episode 5	9 March 2011	950,000	8	
6	Episode 6	16 March 2011	918,000	11	
7	Episode 7	23 March 2011	919,000	10	
8	Episode 8	30 March 2011	1,034,000	6	

=== Season 7 (2011) ===
No.	Title	Air date	Timeslot	Overnight ratings		Ref(s)
No.	Title	Air date	Timeslot	Viewers	Rank	Ref(s)
1	Episode 1	22 August 2011	Monday 7:00pm	1,169,000	3	
2	Episode 2	24 August 2011	Wednesday 7:00pm	965,000	9	
3	Episode 3	29 August 2011	Monday 7:00pm	1,024,000	7	
4	Episode 4	5 September 2011	Monday 7:00pm	962,000	7	
5	Episode 5	12 September 2011	Monday 7:00pm	969,000	9	
6	Episode 6	19 September 2011	Monday 7:00pm	792,000	9	
7	Episode 7	26 September 2011	Monday 7:00pm	864,000	9	
8	Episode 8	3 October 2011	Monday 7:00pm	1,058,000	5	

=== Season 8 (2012) ===
No.	Title	Air date	Overnight ratings		Ref(s)
No.	Title	Air date	Viewers	Rank	Ref(s)
1	Episode 1	15 August 2012	909,000	11	
2	Episode 2	16 August 2012	938,000	7	
3	Episode 3	22 August 2012	936,000	10	
4	Episode 4	23 August 2012	970,000	9	
5	Episode 5	29 August 2012	894,000	10	
6	Episode 6	5 September 2012	784,000	11	
7	Episode 7	12 September 2012	775,000	12	
8	Episode 8	19 September 2012	867,000	11	
9	Episode 9	26 September 2012	987,000	8	

=== Season 9 (2016) ===
No.	Title	Air date	Timeslot	Overnight ratings		Consolidated ratings		Total viewers	Ref(s)
No.	Title	Air date	Timeslot	Viewers	Rank	Viewers	Rank	Total viewers	Ref(s)
1	Episode 1	1 February 2016	Monday 8:50pm	768,000	15	93,000	13	858,000	
2	Episode 2	8 February 2016	Monday 8:50pm	661,000	13	96,000	13	758,000	
3	Episode 3	8 February 2016	Monday 9:50pm	577,000	18	104,000	14	681,000	
4	Episode 4	15 February 2016	Monday 8:50pm	557,000	17	103,000	15	660,000	
5	Episode 5	22 February 2016	Monday 8:45pm	491,000	—N/a	69,000	18	560,000	
6	Episode 6	29 February 2016	Monday 8:50pm	494,000	—N/a	76,000	19	570,000	
7	Episode 7	7 March 2016	Monday 8:55pm	488,000	—N/a	—N/a	—N/a	488,000	
8	Finale	14 March 2016	Monday 9:00pm	667,000	—N/a	57,000	14	667,000	

=== Season 10 (2020) ===
No.	Title	Air date	Timeslot	Overnight ratings		Ref(s)
No.	Title	Air date	Timeslot	Viewers	Rank	Ref(s)
1	Episode 1	26 July 2020	Sunday 7:00pm	985,000	4	
2	Episode 2	27 July 2020	Monday 7:30pm	871,000	6	
3	Episode 3	2 August 2020	Sunday 7:00pm	857,000	5	
4	Episode 4	3 August 2020	Monday 7:30pm	867,000	6	
5	Episode 5	9 August 2020	Sunday 7:00pm	900,000	4	
6	Episode 6	10 August 2020	Monday 7:30pm	786,000	10	
7	Episode 7	16 August 2020	Sunday 7:00pm	930,000	4	
8	Episode 8	17 August 2020	Monday 7:30pm	811,000	7	
9	Episode 9	23 August 2020	Sunday 7:00pm	955,000	4	
10	Finale & Reunion	24 August 2020	Monday 7:30pm	1,010,000	5	

=== Season 11 (2021) ===
No.	Title	Air date	Timeslot	Overnight ratings		Ref(s)
No.	Title	Air date	Timeslot	Viewers	Rank	Ref(s)
1	Episode 1	4 July 2021	Sunday 7:00pm	881,000	3	
2	Episode 2	5 July 2021	Monday 7:30pm	766,000	8	
3	Episode 3	6 July 2021	Tuesday 7:30pm	757,000	8	
4	Episode 4	7 July 2021	Wednesday 7:30pm	760,000	6	
5	Episode 5	11 July 2021	Sunday 7:00pm	725,000	5	
6	Episode 6	12 July 2021	Monday 7:30pm	725,000	9	
7	Episode 7	13 July 2021	Tuesday 7:30pm	682,000	10	
8	Episode 8	14 July 2021	Wednesday 7:30pm	694,000	8	
9	Episode 9	18 July 2021	Sunday 7:00pm	791,000	6	
10	Episode 10	19 July 2021	Monday 7:30pm	792,000	9	
11	Episode 11	20 July 2021	Tuesday 7:30pm	837,000	5	
12	Finale	21 July 2021	Wednesday 7:30pm	922,000	5	
13	Reunion	11 August 2021	Wednesday 7:30pm	900,000	5	

== Awards ==
Year	Award	Category	Result	Ref.
2025	TV Week Logies	Best Structured Reality Program	Nominated	

== See also ==
- International editions
