= The Farmer Wants a Wife (Australian TV series) season 14 =

The Farmer Wants a Wife
- Season 14
- Starring: Bert; Joe; Dustin; Dean; Tom; Todd
- Presented by: Samantha Armytage

Release
- Original network: Seven Network
- Original release: 14 April – 26 May 2024

Season chronology
- ← Previous; Season 13 Next → Season 15

The fourteenth season of The Farmer Wants a Wife premiered on 14 April 2024.

In October 2023, the series was renewed for a fifth season (14th overall) by Seven. In February 2024, the first promo was aired which also revealed the farmers. Halfway through the season, Natalie Gruzlewski introduced a new farmer, Todd, and his dates.

== The farmers ==
Farmer	Age	Location	Profession
Bert Harris	30	Wamuran, QLD	Pineapple and dragon fruit farmer
Joe Bobbin	33	Bombala, NSW	Cattle and sheep farmer
Dustin Manwaring	26	Condobolin, NSW	Third generation farmer
Dean Blanckensee	25	Kandanga, QLD	Cattle and watermelon farmer
Tom	22	Tabilk, VIC	Cattle and crop farmer
Todd	33	Baan Baa, NSW	Cattle farmer

== Contestants ==
=== Bert's dates ===
Name	Age	Home state	Occupation	Eliminated
Brooke	27		Midwife	Episode 15
Karli	32	VIC	Customer service	Episode 15
Caitlin	27	QLD	Disability support worker	Episode 15
Taneil	28		Corporate communications	Episode 11
Lauren	27	QLD	Behaviour support practitioner	Episode 6
Caity	30	QLD	Clinical nurse	Episode 5
April	29	QLD	Registered nurse	Episode 3
Morgan	23	QLD	Multimedia assistant	Episode 1
Ruby	25	VIC	Registered nurse	Episode 1
Olivia	29	QLD	Tutor	Episode 1

=== Joe's dates ===
Name	Age	Home state	Occupation	Eliminated
Sarah	31	NSW	Livestock administrator	
Keely	28	QLD	Resort office supervisor	Episode 17
Claire	36	QLD	Marketing manager	Episode 15
Calya	27	NSW	Fashion stylist	Episode 11
Chelsea	30	VIC	Prison guard	Episode 3
Jen	34	NSW	Equine vet	Episode 2
Alice	32	NSW	Executive assistant	Episode 2
Taylah	28	QLD	Hairdresser	Episode 2

=== Dustin's dates ===
Name	Age	Hometown	Occupation	Eliminated
Sophie	28	VIC	Speech pathologist	
Anna	28	QLD	Midwife	Episode 17
Belle	26	TAS	Deckhand	Episode 15
Izzy	26	SA	Fashion designer's assistant	Episode 11
Chloe	27	SA	Vineyard lab assistant	Episode 8
Kara	22	Brisbane	Supermarket supervisor	Episode 3
Bec	25	VIC	OH&S advisor	Episode 1
Felicity	24	VIC	Livestock saleyard assistant	Episode 1
Kianah	26	NSW	Primary and special education teacher	Episode 1

=== Dean's dates ===
Name	Age	Hometown	Occupation	Eliminated
Teegan	23	NSW	Childcare educator	
Bella	24	QLD	Marketing	Episode 6
Tiffany	24	QLD	Conveyancing paralegal	Episode 6
Hayley	27	QLD	Marketing assistant	Episode 4
Kate	29	NSW	Interior designer	Episode 3
Jayden	24	NSW	Registered nurse	Episode 1
Danae	24	QLD	Registered nurse	Episode 1
Chloe	27	VIC	RSPCA foster care coordinator	Episode 1

=== Tom's dates ===
Name	Age	Hometown	Occupation	Eliminated
Sarah C.	23	WA	Speech pathologist	
Krissy	29	NSW	Customer services	Episode 13
Sarah A.	21	QLD	Uni student	Episode 11
Taylah	23	VIC	Stable hand	Episode 5
Abby	20	QLD	Architecture student	Episode 3
Laura	20	VIC	Childcare educator	Episode 2
Emma	22	NSW	Hairdresser	Episode 2
Holly	26	NSW	Uni student	Episode 2

=== Todd's dates ===
Name	Age	Hometown	Occupation	Eliminated
Daisy	28	QLD	Gym manager	
Grace	25	NSW	School teacher	Episode 17
Jacinta	34	WA	Corporate communications	Episode 16
Ellen	29	NSW	Sports journalist	Episode 15
Iyesha	32	SA	Neurosurgical nurse	Episode 11
Jamira	26	QLD	Public servant	Episode 10
Mollie	24	VIC	Stable foreman	Episode 10
Anna	29	NSW	Lawyer	Episode 10

== Ratings ==
On 28 January 2024, OzTAM's rating data recording system changed. Viewership data then focused on National Reach and National Total ratings instead of the five metro centres and overnight shares.

No.	Title	Air date	Timeslot	National reach viewers	National total viewers	Night rank	Ref(s)
1	Episode 1	14 April 2024	Sunday 7:00 pm	2,060,000	1,015,000	4	
2	Episode 2	15 April 2024	Monday 7:30 pm	1,747,000	893,000	5	
3	Episode 3	16 April 2024	Tuesday 7:30 pm	1,639,000	858,000	3	
4	Episode 4	21 April 2024	Sunday 7:00 pm	2,125,000	1,059,000	2	
5	Episode 5	22 April 2024	Monday 7:30 pm	1,698,000	923,000	4	
6	Episode 6	23 April 2024	Tuesday 7:30 pm	1,835,000	1,006,000	3	
7	Episode 7	28 April 2024	Sunday 7:00 pm	2,104,000	1,101,000	2	
8	Episode 8	29 April 2024	Monday 7:30 pm	1,757,000	998,000	4	
9	Episode 9	30 April 2024	Tuesday 7:30 pm	1,850,000	986,000	3	
10	Episode 10	5 May 2024	Sunday 7:00 pm	2,209,000	1,071,000	2	
11	Episode 11	6 May 2024	Monday 7:30 pm	1,767,000	1,011,000	3	
12	Episode 12	7 May 2024	Tuesday 7:30 pm	1,792,000	1,016,000	4	
13	Episode 13	12 May 2024	Sunday 7:00 pm	2,183,000	1,253,000	2	
14	Episode 14	13 May 2024	Monday 7:30 pm	1,815,000	1,102,000	3	
15	Episode 15	14 May 2024	Tuesday 7:30 pm	1,742,000	1,039,000	3	
16	Episode 16	19 May 2024	Sunday 7:00 pm	1,936,000	1,000,000	4	
17	Final Part 1	20 May 2024	Monday 7:30 pm	1,807,000	1,130,000	3	
18	Final Part 2	21 May 2024	Tuesday 7:30 pm	1,815,000	1,086,000	3	
19	Reunion	26 May 2024	Sunday 8:35 pm	1,665,000	1,049,000	5	
