= Mayhem to Madness =

Studio album by The McClymonts
- Released: 12 June 2020
- Genre: Country
- Label: Island, Universal Music

The McClymonts chronology
Endless (2017)	Mayhem to Madness (2020)

Singles from Mayhem to Madness
- 1. "I Got This" Released: 13 March 2020; 2. "Open Heart" Released: 8 May 2020; 3. "Free Fall" Released: 19 June 2020; 4. "Looking for Perfect" Released: January 2021

Mayhem to Madness is the sixth studio album by Australian country band, the McClymonts, released in Australia on 12 June 2020. The album peaked at number 3 on the ARIA Albums Chart. 9 of the 10 tracks were co-written by Brooke, Sam and Mollie McClymont, with the exception of the Fleetwood Mac's song, "Little Lies".

At the 2021 Country Music Association of Australia awards, the album won Contemporary Country Album of the Year.

== Reception ==
Tyler Jenke from ToneDeaf said "Between songs which sound like they've got the potential to top the US country charts, and introspective displays of professional songwriting, The McClymonts have truly outdone themselves with their latest record", while Zadie Collins from ToneDeaf said "Featuring some of the strongest songs of their career, mixed in with some of their most powerful and precise performances to date, Mayhem to Madness is already on track to be regarded one of the genre's finest in recent memory" calling it "possibly one of the best Australian country albums of the year."

== Track listing ==
1. "Part Time Phase" - 3:13
2. "I Got This" - 3:11
3. "Free Fall" - 3:18
4. "Looking for Perfect" - 4:31
5. "Open Heart" - 2:50
6. "Lighthouse Home" - 3:11
7. "Little Lies" - 3:38
8. "Good Advice" - 3:24
9. "Wish You Hell" - 3:36
10. "Backfired" - 3:14

== Charts ==
=== Weekly charts ===
Chart performance for Mayhem to Madness
Chart (2020)	Peak position
Australian Albums (ARIA)	3

=== Year-end charts ===
Year-end chart performance for Mayhem to Madness
Chart (2020)	Position
Australian Top Country Albums (ARIA)	12
