= Here's to You & I =

Here's To You & I

Studio album by The McClymonts
- Released: 4 July 2014 (Australia)
- Recorded: 2013–2014
- Genre: Country
- Label: Universal
- Producer: Lindsay Rimes

The McClymonts chronology
Two Worlds Collide (2012)	Here's To You & I (2014)	Endless (2017)

Singles from Here's to You & I
- 1. "Going Under (Didn't Have To)" Released: 18 February 2014; 2. "Here's to You & I" Released: 24 May 2014; 3. "Forever Begins Tonight" Released: 14 Nov 2014

Here's to You & I is the fourth studio album by Australian country band The McClymonts, released in Australia on 4 July 2014 by Universal Records and peaking at No. 8. It was their first album that was recorded entirely in Australia.

== Track listing ==
1. "Here's To You & I"
2. "Going Under (Didn't Have To)"
3. "Blood Is Thicker Than Water"
4. "Forever Begins Tonight"
5. "Better At My Worst"
6. "Who Said It"
7. "Alone"
8. "Heart Breaks"
9. "Lifelines & Superheroes"
10. "Top Rolled Down"
11. "Same Kind"
12. "Lay Some Love"

== Charts ==
=== Weekly charts ===
Chart (2014)	Peak position
Australian Albums (ARIA)	8

=== Year-end charts ===
Chart (2014)	Position
Australia Country Albums (ARIA)	8
Chart (2015)	Position
Australia Country Albums (ARIA)	29
Chart (2016)	Position
Australia Country Albums (ARIA)	87
