= The McClymonts =

Australian country music group

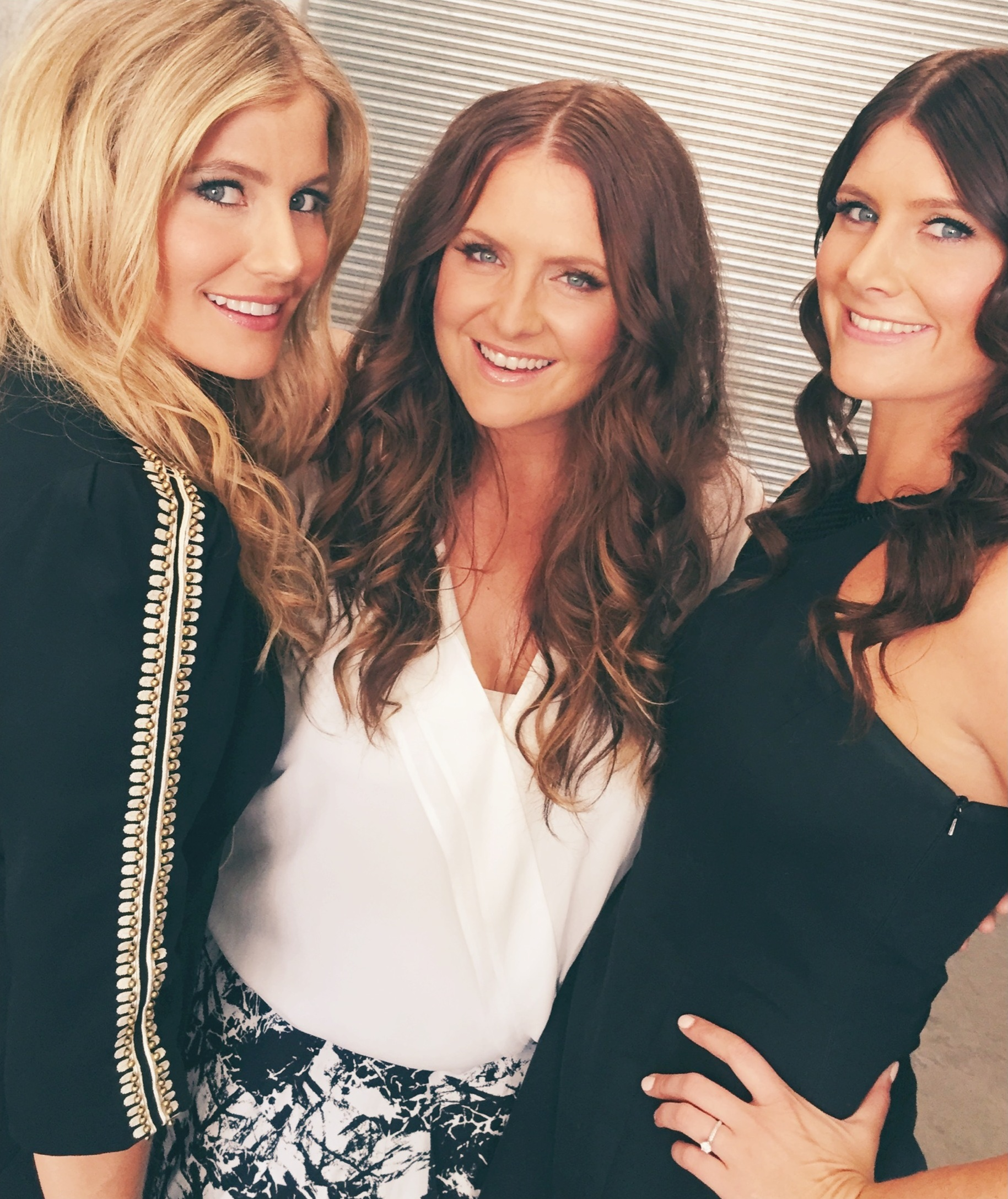
- The McClymonts (left to right): Samantha, Brooke and Mollie

Background information
- Origin: Grafton, New South Wales, Australia
- Genre: Country
- Years active: 2006–present
- Label: Universal
- Members: Brooke McClymont; Mollie McClymont; Samantha McClymont
- Website: themcclymonts.net.au

The McClymonts are an Australian country music trio comprising sisters Brooke (born 1981), Samantha (born 1986) and Mollie McClymont (born 1987), originally from Grafton, New South Wales. They have released one eponymous EP and six studio albums, Chaos and Bright Lights, Wrapped Up Good, Two Worlds Collide, Here's To You & I, Endless and Mayhem to Madness. They have won fifteen Golden Guitars and two ARIA Awards.

== Music career ==
The McClymonts were discovered by Universal Records in 1997 when they were performing at the Gympie Muster, which saw eldest sister Brooke signed to the label. After middle sister Samantha went solo, Universal decided to sign them as a trio in February 2006.

=== 2006: The McClymonts EP ===
The band recorded their first release The McClymonts at the Rocking Horse Studios in Byron Bay with producer Steve James. It was released on 5 June 2006 and peaked at number forty on the Australian ARIA Singles Chart. The success of the EP led to 'The Outback to the Beaches Tour', with fellow country singer Lee Kernaghan, and gave them a chance to show their new music to audiences nationwide. "Something That My Heart Does" was the first track released from the EP and was a hit on the Australian country music radio charts, peaking at number three. "Baby's Gone Home" was the second and last song released from the EP and became their first song to reach number one on the country music and radio charts. On 16 August 2006 the group performed at the ARIA Hall of Fame Induction at The Regent in Melbourne performing the song "Delta Dawn" by ARIA Hall of Fame inductee Helen Reddy.

The band ended the year by touring with the Australian Defence Force's Tour deForce 6, performing a New Year's Eve concert at Al Minhad Air Base in the United Arab Emirates in front of deployed Australian, New Zealand and Canadian troops.

=== 2007–2008: Chaos and Bright Lights ===
In February 2007 The McClymonts went to Nashville to record and write their first studio album Chaos and Bright Lights with writers such as Monty Powell (Keith Urban), Eric Silver (Dixie Chicks), Trey Bruce (LeAnn Rimes), Nathan Chapman, Steve Diamond (Lonestar) and Frank Myers. In Australia they wrote with Rod McCormack and recording artist Shane Nicholson. The album was released on 12 November 2007 in Australia and peaked at number thirty-seven on the Australian ARIA Albums Chart. At the ARIA Music Awards of 2008, Chaos and Bright Lights was nominated for Best Country Album. The album was released in the US on 17 August 2010 via Executive Music Group.

=== 2009–2011: Wrapped Up Good ===
The McClymonts recorded their second album Wrapped Up Good in Nashville in late 2009 with producer Adam Anders. The album was released in Australia on 15 January 2010, entering the Australian albums chart at number 2, and remaining on the chart for 14 weeks. At the 24th ARIA Music Awards, the group won the award in the Best Country Album category.

The McClymonts extensively toured the US during 2011, promoting the American release of Wrapped Up Good. They toured and opened for American country artist Jason Aldean. They also made appearances opening for Lady Antebellum, Kellie Pickler and Ozzy Osbourne. They played at the historic Grand Ole Opry three times in the year.

=== 2012–2013: Two Worlds Collide ===
The McClymonts' third studio album, Two Worlds Collide, was released on 18 May 2012 in Australia. It peaked at number 7 on Australia Music Chart. At the 26th ARIA Music Awards, it won the award for Best Country Album. In 2013 it won Video Clip of the Year and Top Selling Album of the Year at the Country Music Awards of Australia.

=== 2014–2015: Here's to You & I ===
The McClymonts began 2014 with the release of a single entitled "Going Under (Didn't Have To)" on 17 January 2014. The release coincided with the annual Tamworth Country Music Festival where the group hosted the 42nd Annual Country Music Association of Australia Awards. "Going Under (Didn't Have To)" debuted at No. 91 on the ARIA Singles Chart on 24 January 2014 and went on to reach No. 1 on both The Music Network Official Australian Country Airplay Chart and the Country Music Channel Top 50 Countdown Chart.

The trio entered the studio in March with producer Lindsay Rimes to record Here's to You & I, the follow-up album to Two Worlds Collide. Work on the album was completed in late April and the album was released in July through Universal Music Australia on 4 July 2014. It debuted at number 8 on the ARIA Albums Chart and number 1 on the ARIA Country Albums Chart.

The trio spent the rest of 2014 and the first half of 2015 touring Australia. The band were awarded Highest Selling Australian Album of the Year and Group or Duo of the Year at the CMAA Golden Guitar Awards held in Tamworth in January 2015. They also won Group of the Year at Country Music Channel Awards held in Brisbane in March 2015. They were nominated for Country Album of the Year at the 2014 ARIA Awards while "Going Under (Didn't Have To)" and "Here's to You & I" were both nominated for Country Work of the Year for the 2015 APRA Awards. On 25 July 2015 the album achieved 52 weeks in the ARIA Top 40 Country Albums Chart.

=== 2016–2019: Endless ===
In October 2016, The McClymonts released "House", the lead single from their fifth studio album Endless which was released in 2017. The album peaked at number 3 on the ARIA Charts. At the 2018 CMAA, The McClymonts lead the nominations, with 6.

In February 2018, Brooke released the album Adam + Brooke with her husband Adam Eckersley. It peaked at number 16 on the ARIA Charts.

=== 2020: Mayhem to Madness ===
In March 2020 the McClymonts released "I Got This", followed by "Open Heart" in May as the lead singles from their sixth studio album, Mayhem to Madness, issued on 12 June. At the 2020 ARIA Music Awards in November, the group were part of an all-female ensemble, which performed, "I Am Woman", in tribute of recently deceased Australian-born, US-based singer-songwriter, Helen Reddy.

== Personal lives ==
Brooke married country singer Adam Eckersley on 17 October 2009. They had a daughter in 2012 and a son in 2020.

Samantha married pilot Ben Poxon in November 2014. In April 2017, she announced via a music clip that she was pregnant. She gave birth to a son in August 2017 and a second son in 2019.

Mollie married Aaron Blackburn on 20 May 2015. She gave birth to a son in early 2016 and a daughter in 2018.

In early 2024, Samantha was diagnosed with triple-negative breast cancer. She stood aside from all work commitments to focus on five months of chemotherapy and immunotherapy, followed by surgery and radiation. In 2025, Mollie underwent a double mastectomy after learning that she carried the same gene responsible for Samantha's cancer.

== Discography ==
- Chaos and Bright Lights (2007)
- Wrapped Up Good (2010)
- Two Worlds Collide (2012)
- Here's to You & I (2014)
- Endless (2017)
- Mayhem to Madness (2020)

== Awards and nominations ==
=== ARIA Awards ===
Year	Award	Work	Result
2008	Best Country Album	Chaos and Bright Lights	Nominated
2010	Best Country Album	Wrapped Up Good	Won
2012	Best Country Album	Two Worlds Collide	Won
2014	Best Country Album	Here's To You & I	Nominated
2017	Best Country Album	Endless	Nominated
2020	Best Country Album	Mayhem to Madness	Nominated

=== APRA Awards ===
Year	Work	Category	Result
2010	"Kick it Up" (Brooke McClymont, Trey Bruce)	Country Work of the Year	Nominated
2011	"Wrapped Up Good" (Brooke McClymont, Mollie McClymont, Samantha McClymont, Nathan Chapman)	Country Work of the Year	Nominated
2013	"Piece of Me" (Samantha McClymont, Frank Myers, Lindsay Rimes)	Country Work of the Year	Won
2021	"I Got This" (Brooke McClymont, Mollie McClymont, Samantha McClymont, Andy Mak)	Most Performed Country Work of the Year	Nominated

=== Country Music Awards of Australia ===
- Note: Wins only

Year	Award	Detail
2007	Group or Duo of the Year	"Something That My Heart Does"
2007	New Talent of the Year	"Something That My Heart Does"
2008	Group or Duo of the Year	"Save Yourself"
2009	Group or Duo of the Year	"Finally Over Blue"
2010	Vocal Collaboration of the Year	"Ain't Gonna Change for You" (with Troy Cassar-Daley)
2011	Group or Duo of the Year	"Wrapped Up Good"
2013	Top Selling Album of the Year	Two Worlds Collide
2013	Video Clip of the Year	"Piece of Me"
2015	Top Selling Album of the Year	Here's To You and I
2015	Group or Duo of the Year	"Here's To You and I"
2018	Country Music Album of the Year	Endless
2018	Contemporary Country Album of the Year	Endless
2018	Country Music Group or Duo of the Year	Endless
2021	Contemporary Country Album of the Year	Mayhem to Madness
2021	Group or Duo of the Year	Mayhem to Madness

=== Australian Club Entertainment (ACE) Awards ===
The McClymonts have won the Best Country Group award every year from 2007 to 2014.

=== Mo Awards ===
The Australian Entertainment Mo Awards (commonly known informally as the Mo Awards), were annual Australian entertainment industry awards. They recognise achievements in live entertainment in Australia from 1975 to 2016. The McClymonts won two awards in that time.

Year	Nominee / work	Award	Result (wins only)
2008	The McClymonts	Country Group	Won
2009	The McClymonts	Slim Dusty Country Performer or Band	Won
