= Borambola =

- Town
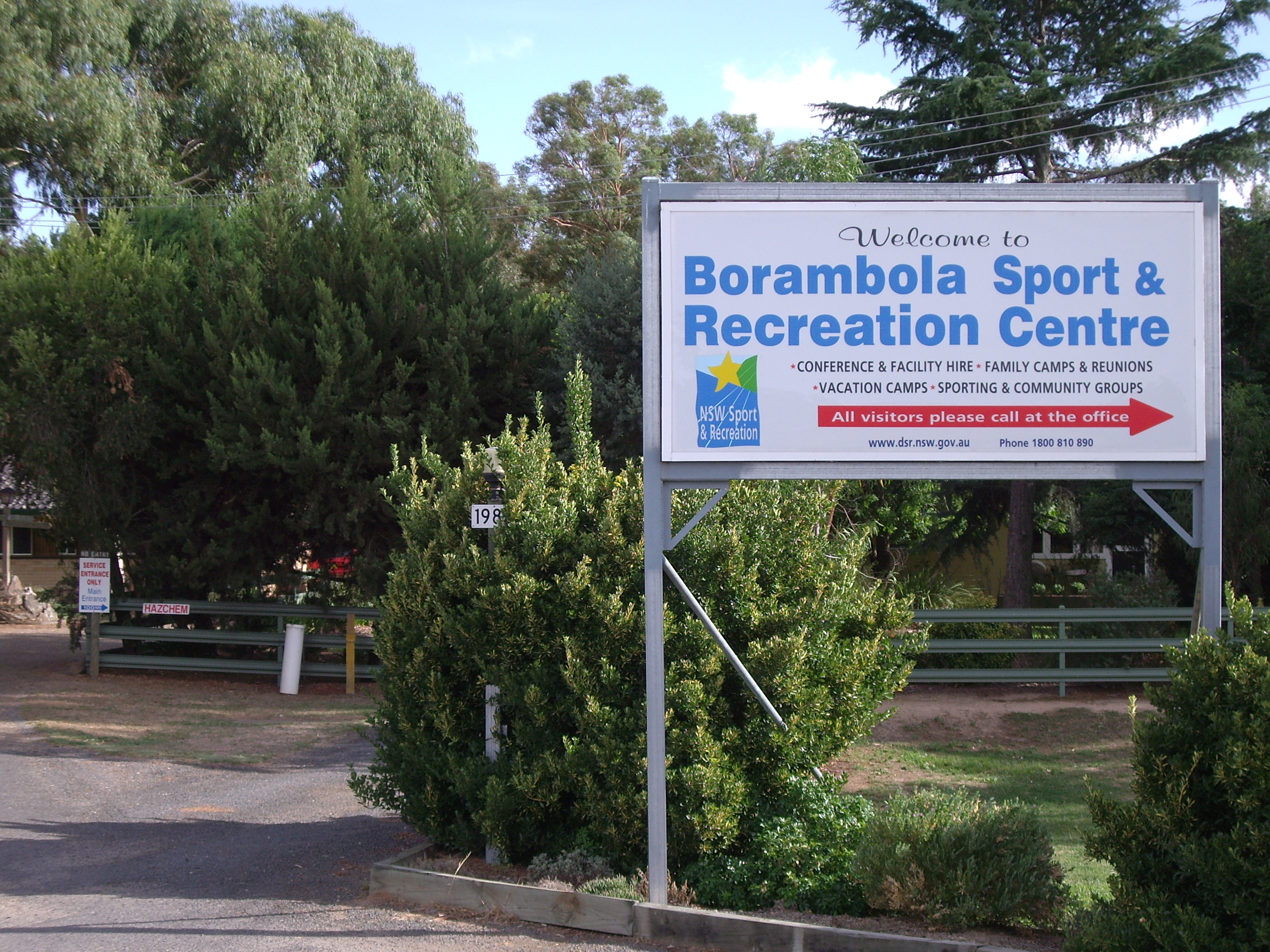
- Borambola

- Coordinates: 35°12′S 147°40′E
- Country: Australia
- State: New South Wales
- Location: 418 km (260 mi) from Sydney; 31 km (19 mi) from Wagga Wagga; 15 km (9.3 mi) from Alfred Town; 14 km (8.7 mi) from Tarcutta

Government
  - State electorate: Wagga Wagga
- Elevation: 292 m (958 ft)

Population
  - Total: 129 (2021 census)
- Postcode: 2650
- County: Wynyard

Borambola is a rural community in the central east part of the Riverina. It is on the Sturt Highway about 16 kilometres east of Alfredtown and 30 kilometres east of Wagga Wagga. At the 2021 census Borambola had a population of 117 people.

The Borambola area is home to the Borambola Sport and Recreation Centre that caters for conference and facility hire, as well as family, vacation, school camps and reunion camps. Borambola Sport and Recreation Centre is managed by NSW Sport and Recreation.
