= Samantha McClymont =

Australian singer-songwriter (born 1986)

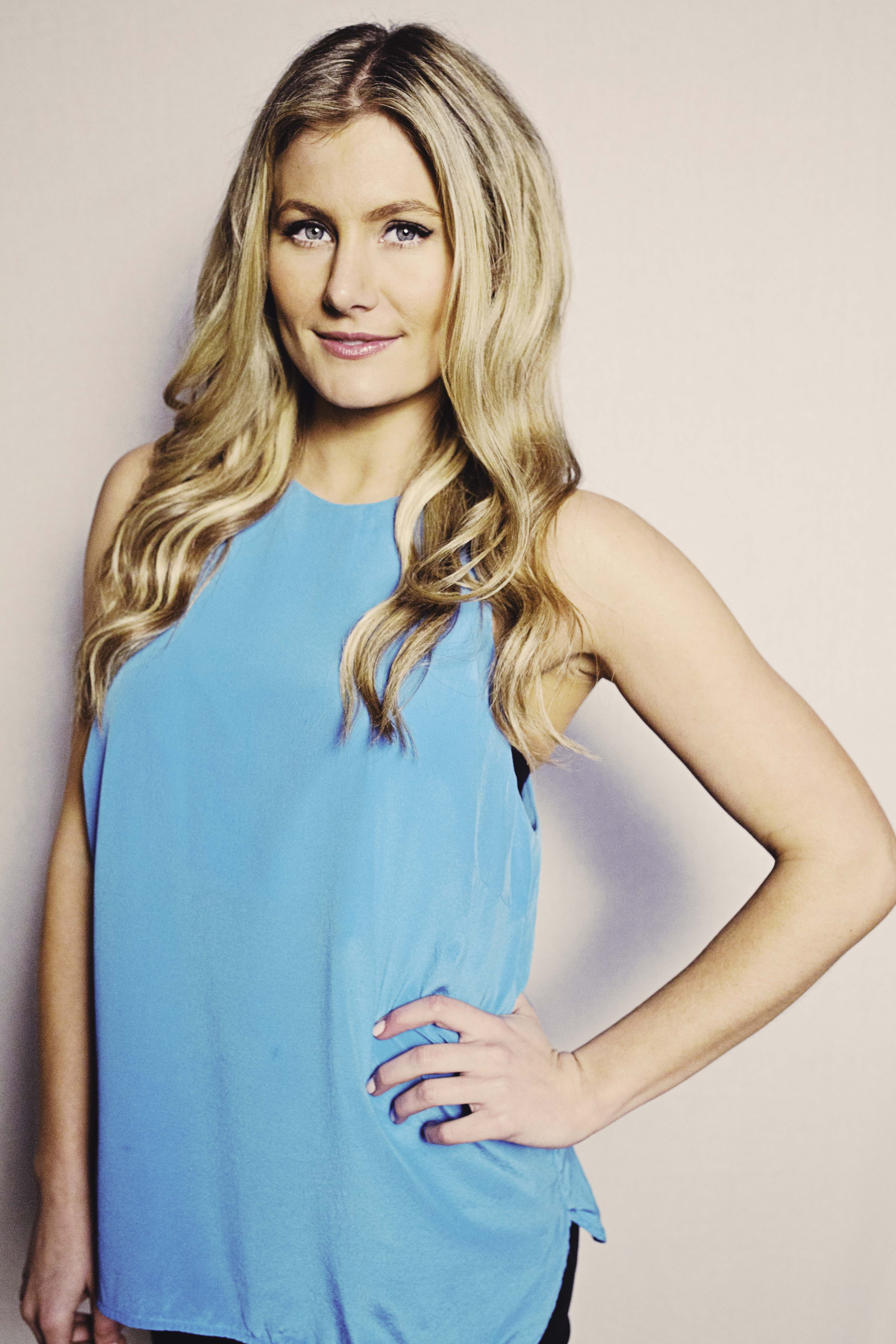

Background information
- Also known as: Sam McClymont
- Born: 1986 (age 39–40); Grafton, New South Wales, Australia
- Genre: Country
- Occupations: Singer-songwriter, television presenter
- Instruments: Bass guitar, vocals
- Years active: 2004–present
- Labels: Universal, Warner Music Group
- Website: themcclymonts.net.au

Samantha McClymont (born 1986) is an Australian singer-songwriter. She is a member of the country music family band The McClymonts with her older sister Brooke McClymont and younger sister Mollie. She is also a television presenter on travel program Getaway and the matchmaker series The Farmer Wants a Wife.

== Biography ==
Born in Grafton, New South Wales, McClymont and her sisters spent much of their spare time travelling around eastern Australia performing in talent quests and country shows.

McClymont completed high school in 2003 and began a professional career in music. In 2004 she was selected among the top 118 contestants for Australian Idol but did not make it into the Top 30. In the same year she was crowned as Jacaranda Queen in her home town of Grafton. She also received the Trans-Tasman Entertainer of the Year award.

In January 2005, McClymont won the Star Maker quest at the Tamworth Country Music Festival. She was subsequently signed by Warner Music Group and recorded two singles. The first single "Cookin' in my Kitchen" led to McClymont being named New Talent of the Year at the 2006 Country Music Awards of Australia. At the awards, McClymont performed with her sisters as The McClymonts and "stole the show".

Also in 2006, McClymont and her sisters performed for defence personnel in Iraq, where she met her future husband. They married in 2014.

In 2013, McClymont won an APRA Music Award for the song "Piece Of Me" written with Frank Myers and Lindsay Rimes.

In 2015, McClymont joined the lifestyle program Getaway as a presenter and was also the host of the reality television program The Farmer Wants a Wife in 2016.

In early 2024, McClymont was diagnosed with triple-negative breast cancer. She stood aside from all work commitments to focus on five months of chemotherapy and immunotherapy, followed by surgery and radiation.

== The McClymonts ==
McClymont has performed with her sisters as The McClymonts since 2006. They have recorded an EP and five albums. Their first album Chaos and Bright Lights and second album Wrapped Up Good are certified gold records in Australia.

The McClymonts are five-time winners of the title Group or Duo of the Year and twice winners of Highest Selling Album of the Year at the Country Music Awards of Australia. The McClymonts have won two ARIA Awards.

== Videography ==
- Wood, Ross (Producer). "Cookin' In My Kitchen". 171entertainment.com.
- Wood, Ross (Producer). "Heart of a Man". 171entertainment.com.

== Awards ==
=== Country Music Awards of Australia ===
The Country Music Awards of Australia (CMAA) (also known as the Golden Guitar Awards) is an annual awards night held in January during the Tamworth Country Music Festival, celebrating recording excellence in the Australian country music industry. They have been held annually since 1973.

Year	Nominee / work	Award	Result
2006	"Heart of a Man" by Samantha McClymont	New Talent of the Year	Won

- Note: wins only
