= Natalie Gruzlewski =

Australian television presenter (born 1975)

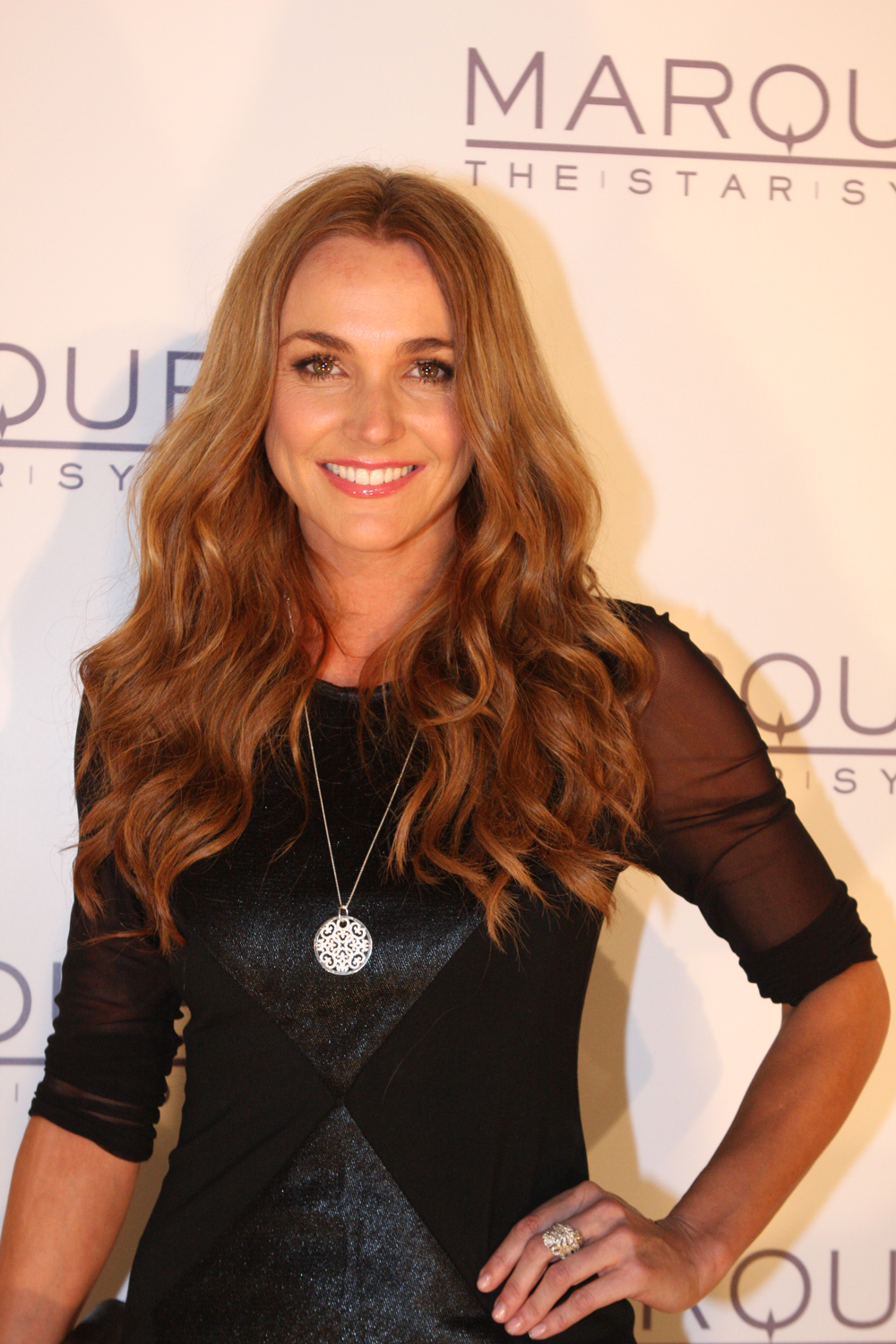
- Gruzlewski in 2012
- Born: 1977 (age 48–49)
- Education: Griffith University
- Occupation: Television presenter
- Years active: 1999–present
- Spouses: Luke Egan (m. 2009–2011) Jack Ray (m. 2012)
- Children: 1

Natalie Gruzlewski (born 1977) is an Australian television presenter.

== Career ==
Gruzlewski studied journalism at Griffith University after finishing school. Her career began on the Gold Coast as host of Prime Television's Surf TV, a beach and surf conditions program. In 1999, she joined the Nine Network as weather presenter on the network's Nine Gold Coast News bulletin. She acquired a national identity as 'Lady Luck' on The NRL Footy Show in 2002–2003.

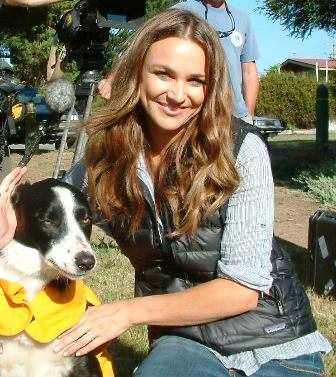
Gruzlewski in 2009

In 2004, Gruzlewski joined Nine Network's travel program Getaway as a full-time presenter. She also hosted the reality series The Farmer Wants a Wife from 2007 to 2012.

In October 2009, she filled in on Weekend Today while Leila McKinnon was on holidays. In February 2010, she was appointed weather presenter on Nine News Sydney from Monday to Thursday; she also filed lifestyle and entertainment reports for Nine News. In September 2013, Gruzlewski was appointed weather presenter on Nine Gold Coast News replacing Paul Burt. In October 2014, she resigned from the Nine Network.

In 2020, Gruzlewski returned to hosting The Farmer Wants a Wife, this time on the Seven Network.

== Personal life ==
Gruzlewski is of Polish descent and grew up on the Gold Coast, Queensland. In 2009, she married former professional surfer Luke Egan; however, after two years of marriage, they separated. In May 2012, Gruzlewski announced that she was engaged to property developer Jack Ray and in October she was pregnant with her first child. In November 2012, Gruzlewski married Jack Ray in a private ceremony. She gave birth to daughter in 2013.

Media offices
Preceded by Paul Burt	Nine Gold Coast News; Weather presenter September 2013 – October 2014	Succeeded by Courtney Pattinson
Preceded by Jaynie Seal	Nine News Sydney; Weather presenter (Monday to Thursday); February 2010 – November 2012	Succeeded by Amber Sherlock
