= Brooke McClymont =

Australian musician (born 1981)

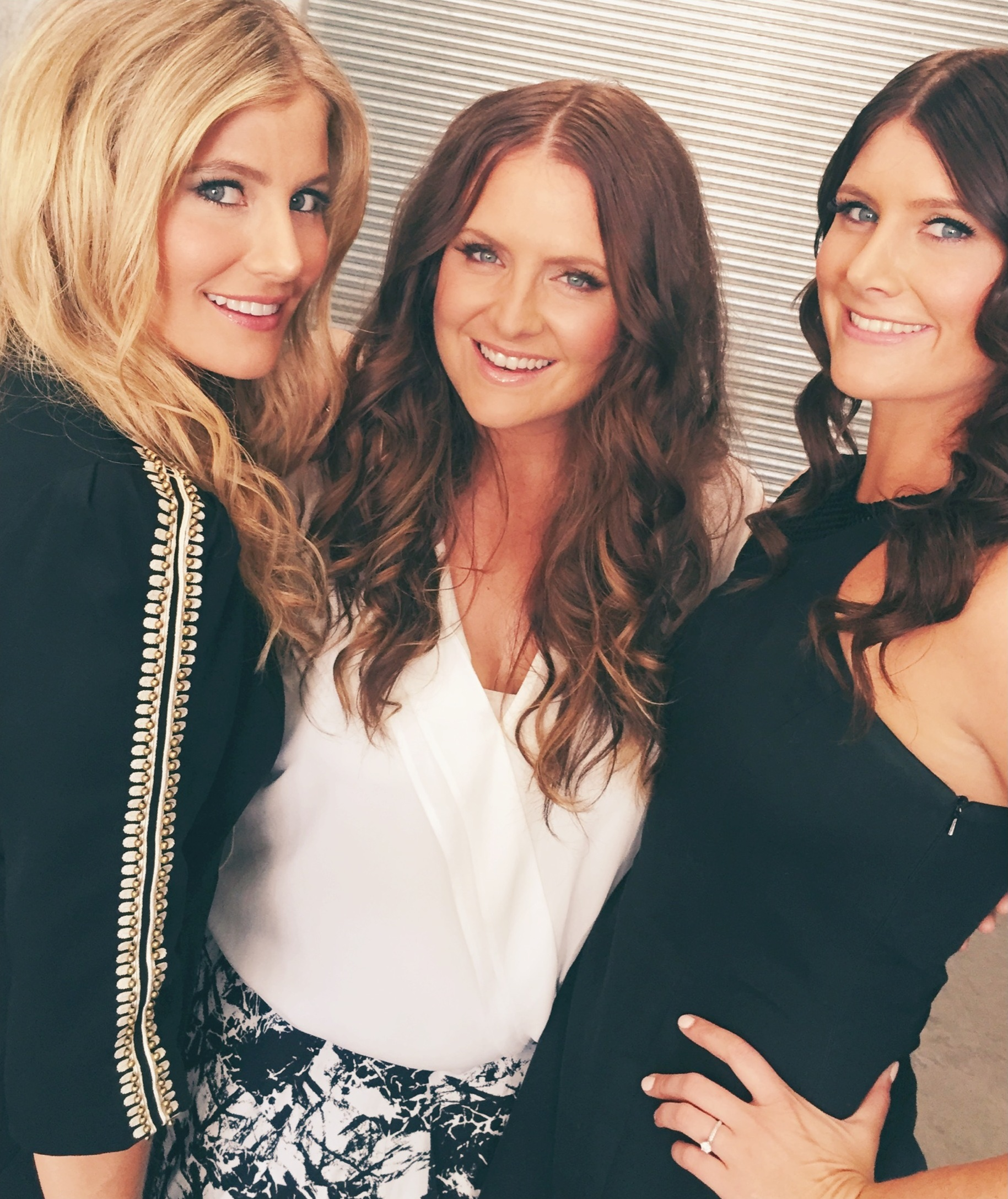
- McClymont (middle), with her sisters Samantha (left) and Mollie (right)

Background information
- Born: Brooke Maree McClymont; 16 May 1981 (age 45); Grafton, New South Wales, Australia
- Genres: Pop, rock, country, adult contemporary
- Occupation: Singer-songwriter
- Instruments: Vocals; guitar
- Years active: 2002–present
- Label: Universal (1998–present)
- Website: brookeandadam.com

Brooke Maree McClymont (born 16 May 1981) is an Australian singer, songwriter and guitarist. With her two younger sisters, Samantha and Mollie, she is a founder of a country music trio, the McClymonts. She has written songs for Kate DeAraugo and Olivia Newton-John and been a support act for Troy Cassar-Daley and Ronan Keating. Her influences include Sheryl Crow, ABBA, Faith Hill and Alanis Morissette.

== Biography ==
McClymont was discovered in 1992, at age eleven, when a family friend heard her sing in front of the mirror at her home and told Brooke's mother that she should put her into the Jacaranda Talent Quest in Grafton. Her mother entered her into the contest and she sang "All I Wanna Do Is Make Love to You" by Heart. In 1999, she sang "God Save the Queen" and "Advance Australia Fair" to open the day-night Australia vs. England cricket match.

Charles Fisher was one of the people McClymont worked with on her debut album and she stated that the two had a really good working relationship. "I Can't Wait" was chosen to be the first song released because McClymont felt it is a really positive song and definitely shows her personality. The song was released as a CD single on 17 June 2002 and peaked in the top 50 at number 49. Soon after, the song was again recorded by Hilary Duff for the Disney Channel original series Lizzie McGuire. "I Don't Think, I Know" was the second song released on 2 December 2002 and it also peaked in the top 50 at number 45. McClymont stated that she did not get to release her album as "certain circumstances arose, it just never happened".

In 2006, McClymont and her two sisters (Samantha and Mollie) started a band named The McClymonts. By 2019 the band had amassed one platinum and two gold records, two ARIA Awards, one APRA Award and thirteen Country Music Awards of Australia ("Golden Guitars").

In 2016, McClymont appeared in her first movie, Australian romantic comedy Spin Out.

McClymont is married to singer-songwriter Adam Eckersley. They had a daughter in 2013 and a son in 2020.

The duo released the album Adam & Brooke in February 2018 which peaked at number 16 on the ARIA Charts.

In January 2022, McClymont appeared as a contestant on the eighth season of I’m A Celebrity…Get Me Out Of Here! Australia. She finished second, behind winner Dylan Lewis.

On 30 June 2023, McClymont and Eckersley released their second album Up, Down & Sideways.

McClymont and Eckersley appeared on the eighth season of The Amazing Race Australia in 2024.

In 2025 it was announced the couple would join the team in The Travel Guides in 2026

The third Brooke McClymont & Adam Eckersley album Souls on Show is scheduled for release on 28 August 2026.

== Discography ==
=== Albums ===
List of studio albums, with selected chart positions
Title	Album details	Peak chart positions
Title	Album details	AUS
Adam & Brooke (as Adam Eckersley & Brooke McClymont)	Released: 9 February 2018; Label: Lost Highway, Universal; Formats: CD, digital download, streaming	16
Up, Down & Sideways (as Brooke McClymont & Adam Eckersley)	Released: 30 June 2023; Label: Lost Highway, Universal; Formats: CD, digital download, streaming	26
Souls on Show (as Adam Eckersley & Brooke McClymont)	Released: 28 August 2026; Label: Lost Highway, Universal; Formats: CD, digital download, streaming	12

=== Singles ===
Year	Song	Peak chart positions	Album
Year	Song	AUS	Album
2002	"I Can't Wait"	49	Single only
2002	"I Don't Think, I Know"	45	Single only
2017	"Train Wreck" (with Adam Eckersley)	—	Adam & Brooke
2018	"So Smooth" (with Adam Eckersley)	—	Adam & Brooke
2018	"Nothing Left to Win" (with Adam Eckersley)	—	Adam & Brooke
2022	"Star of the Show" (with Adam Eckersley)	—	Up, Down & Sideways
2022	"Roll on Baby" (with Adam Eckersley)	—	Up, Down & Sideways
2022	"Memory Lane" (with Adam Eckersley)	—	Up, Down & Sideways
2023	"Country Music, You and Beer" (with Adam Eckersley)	—	Up, Down & Sideways
2023	"Lost If I Lost You" (with Adam Eckersley)	—	Up, Down & Sideways
2023	"What Are You Waiting For" (with Adam Eckersley)	—	Up, Down & Sideways
2026	"Now I've Said It" (with Adam Eckersley)	—	Souls on Show
2026	"Someone Else's Dream" (with Adam Eckersley)	—	Souls on Show
2026	"In and Out of Love" (with Adam Eckersley)	—	Souls on Show

== Awards and nominations ==
=== ARIA Music Awards ===
The ARIA Music Awards are a set of annual ceremonies presented by Australian Recording Industry Association (ARIA), which recognise excellence, innovation, and achievement across all genres of the music of Australia. They commenced in 1987.

Year	Nominee / work	Award	Result	Ref.
2018	Adam & Brooke (with Adam Eckersley)	Best Country Album	Nominated	
2023	Up, Down & Sideways (with Adam Eckersley)	Best Country Album	Nominated	

=== Country Music Awards of Australia ===
The Country Music Awards of Australia is an annual awards night held in January during the Tamworth Country Music Festival. Celebrating recording excellence in the Australian country music industry. They commenced in 1973.

Year	Nominee / work	Award	Result	Ref.
2019	"Train Wreck" (with Adam Eckersley)	Song of the Year	Nominated	
2019	"Train Wreck" (with Adam Eckersley)	Single of the Year	Nominated	
2019	Adam & Brooke	Group or Duo of the Year	Nominated	
2019	Adam & Brooke (with Adam Eckersley)	Contemporary Country Album of the Year	Nominated	
2023	"Memory Lane" (with Adam Eckersley)	Single of the Year	Won	
2023	"Star of the Show" (with Adam Eckersley) (Directed by Brad Murnane)	Video of the Year	Nominated	
2023	"Star of the Show" (with Adam Eckersley)	Song of the Year	Won	
2023	Brooke McClymont & Adam Eckersley	Group or Duo of the Year	Won	
2024	Up, Down & Sideways (with Adam Eckersley)	Album of the Year	Nominated	
2024	Up, Down & Sideways (with Adam Eckersley)	Contemporary Country Album of the Year	Nominated	
2024	"What Are You Waiting For" (with Adam Eckersley)	Single of the Year	Nominated	
2024	"Country Music, You and Beer" (with Adam Eckersley)	Song of the Year	Nominated	
2024	Brooke McClymont & Adam Eckersley	Group or Duo of the Year	Nominated	
2025	"What Are You Waiting For" (with Adam Eckersley)	Video of the Year	Pending	
2027	"In and Out of Love" (with Adam Eckersley)	Song of the Year	Pending	
2027	"In and Out of Love" (with Adam Eckersley)	Single of the Year	Pending	
2027	"Souls On Show" (with Adam Eckersley)	Video of the Year	Pending	
2027	Brooke McClymont & Adam Eckersley	Group or Duo of the Year	Pending	
2027	Souls On Show (with Adam Eckersley)	Contemporary Country Album of the Year	Pending	
2027	Souls On Show (with Adam Eckersley)	Album of the Year	Pending	
