= Meg Mac discography =

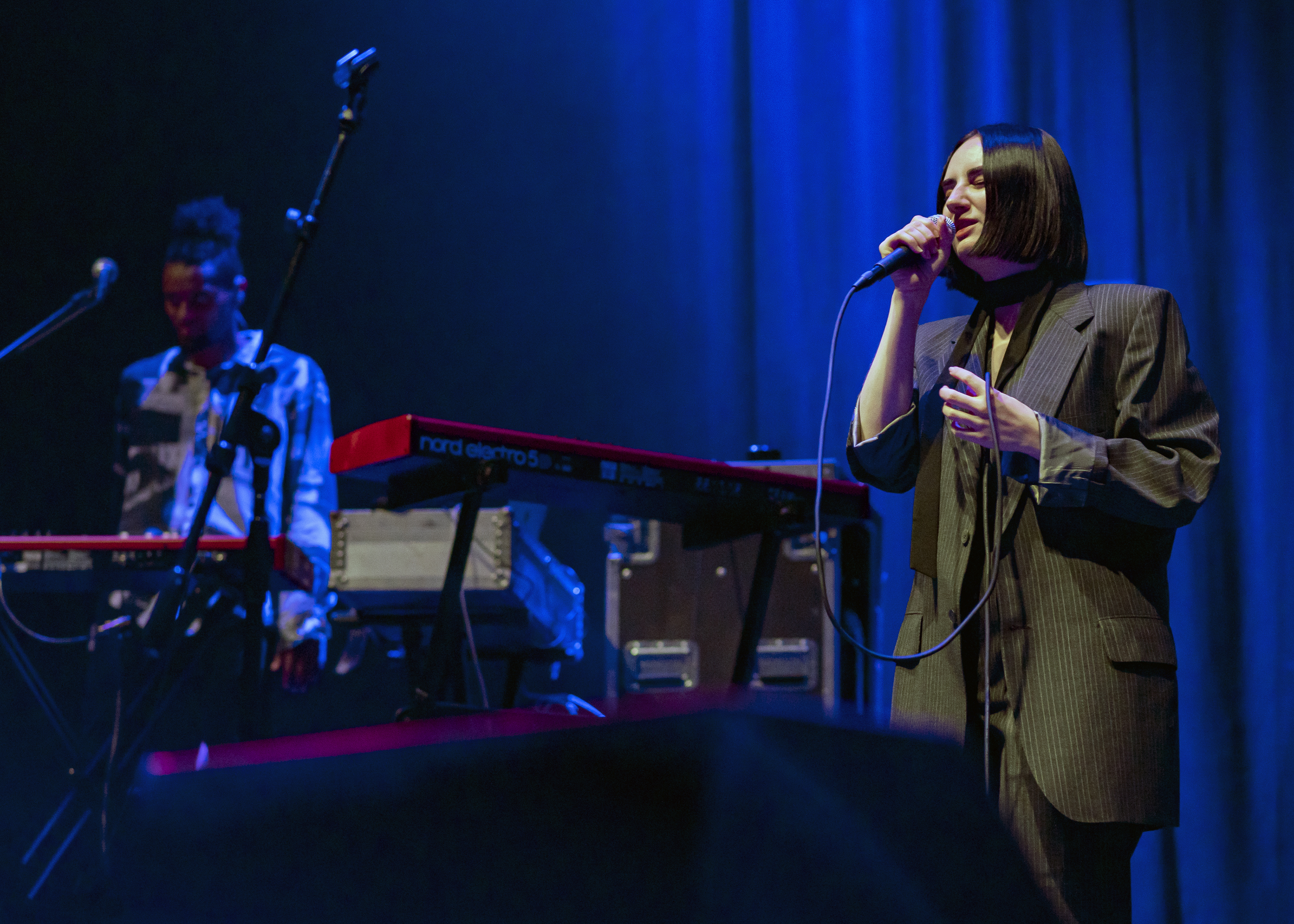
- Meg Mac in August 2022
- Studio albums: 4
- EPs: 2
- Singles: 24

Australian singer and songwriter Meg Mac has released four studio albums, two extended plays, and twenty-four singles (including two as a featured artist).

== Albums ==
Title	Album details	Peak chart positions
Title	Album details	AUS
Low Blows	Release date: 14 July 2017; Label: LittleBIGMan; Formats: Digital download, CD, LP	2
Hope	Release date: 7 June 2019; Label: LittleBIGMan; Formats: Digital download, CD, streaming	9
Matter of Time	Released: 16 September 2022; Label: EMI, UMA; Formats: Digital download, CD, LP, streaming	1
It's My Party	Released: 20 February 2026; Label: EMI, UMA; Formats: Digital download, CD, LP, streaming	6

== Extended plays ==
Title	EP details	Certifications
MegMac	Release date: 12 September 2014; Label: 300 Entertainment; Formats: Digital download, CD	ARIA: Platinum
Live at Golden Retriever	Release date: 29 November 2022; Label: EMI, UMA; Formats: Digital download, LP (limited)	

== Singles ==
=== As lead artist ===
List of singles as lead artist, with chart position
Title	Year	Peak chart positions	Certifications	Album
Title	Year	AUS	Certifications	Album
"Known Better"	2013	—		MegMac
"Every Lie"	2013	—		MegMac
"Roll Up Your Sleeves"	2014	80	ARIA: Platinum	MegMac
"Grandma's Hands"	2014	—		MegMac
"Never Be"	2015	39		Non-album single
"Low Blows"	2017	—	ARIA: Platinum	Low Blows
"Maybe It's My First Time"	2017	92	ARIA: Platinum	Low Blows
"Don't Need Permission"	2017	—		Low Blows
"Give Me My Name Back"	2018	—		Hope
"Something Tells Me"	2019	—		Hope
"I'm Not Coming Back"	2019	—	ARIA: Gold	Hope
"Hope"	2019	—		Hope
"Is It Worth Being Sad"	2022	—		Matter of Time
"On Your Mind"	2022	—		Matter of Time
"Only Love"	2022	—		Matter of Time
"Letter"	2022	—		Matter of Time
"Understand"	2022	—		Matter of Time
"No Time to Die" (triple j Like a Version)	2023	—		Non-album single
"Bricks" (with Matt Corby)	2024	—		Non-album single
"Home"	2024	—		Non-album single
"He Said No"	2025	—		It's My Party
"The Tune I'll Be Singing Until I'm Dead"	2025	—		It's My Party
"Sometimes"	2025	—		It's My Party
"Outdone"	2026	—		It's My Party
"—" denotes a recording that did not chart or was not released.

=== As featured artist ===
List of singles as featured artist
Title	Year	Peak chart positions		Album
Title	Year	LTU Air.	NZ Hot	Album
"Reaction" (Dan Sultan featuring Meg Mac)	2018	—	—	Killer Under a Blood Moon
"Break My Heart" (Bag Raiders featuring Meg Mac)	2026	69	23	Non-album single
"—" denotes a recording that did not chart or was not released.
