= Mustered Courage =

Australian band

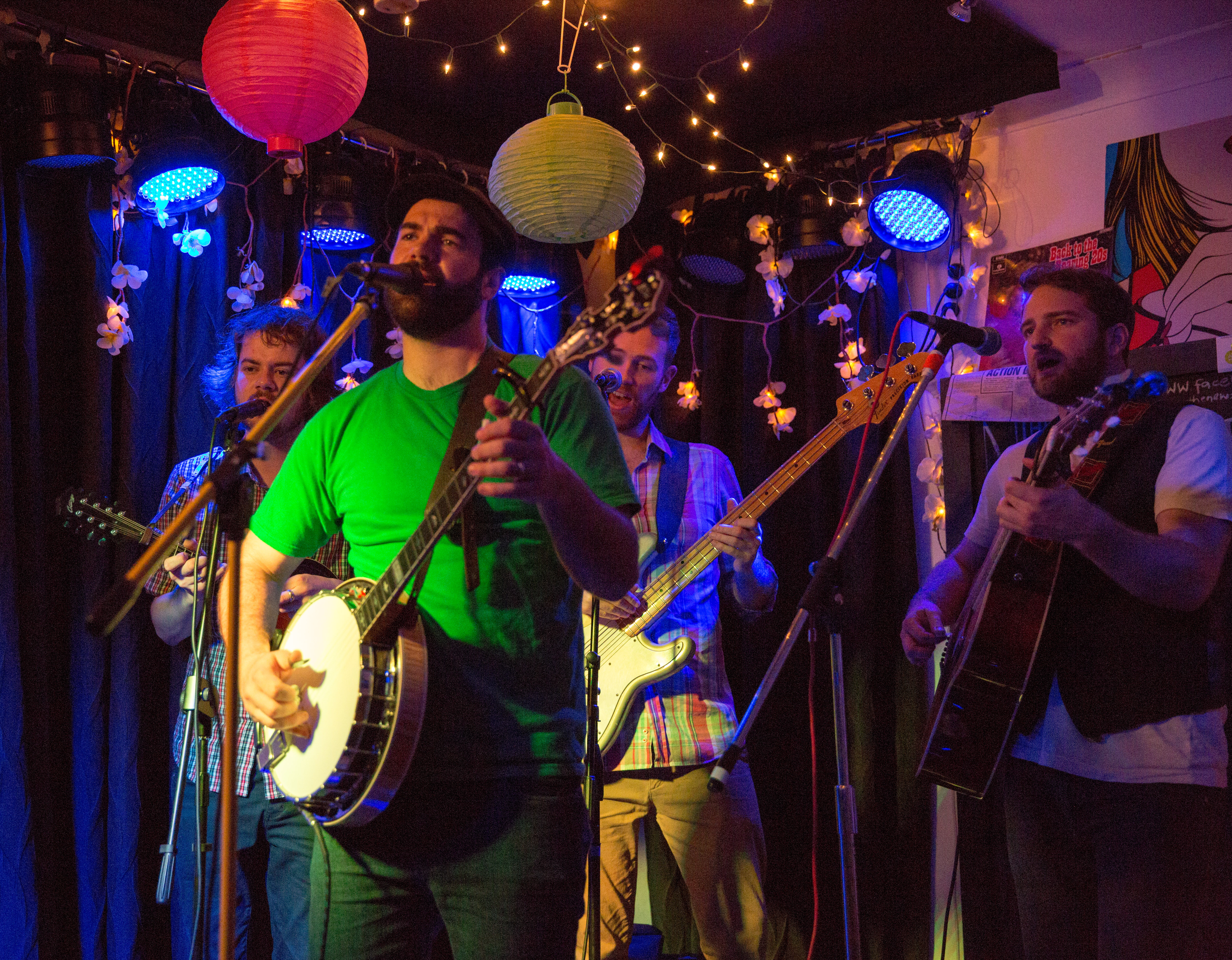
- September 2013

Background information
- Origin: Melbourne, Australia
- Genres: Progressive bluegrass, Americana, Alternative country, Bluegrass
- Years active: 2010–2019
- Labels: Lost Highway Australia, Laughing Outlaw (Australia), Travianna Records (USA)
- Members: Julian Abrahams; Josh Bridges; Nick Keeling; Josh Bennett
- Past members: Hugh Stuckey; Paddy Montgomery; Jimmy Annand
- Website: MusteredCourage.com

Mustered Courage was a progressive bluegrass and Americana based band from Melbourne, Australia. The band's music combined elements of bluegrass, country, rock, jazz, and jam band with extended improvisational solo breaks.

Mustered Courage's third album, White Lies & Melodies, was nominated for Best Country Album at the ARIA Music Awards of 2015. The band's song "Candle Creek" won the Golden Guitar Awards for Instrumental of the Year at the 43rd CMAA Country Music Awards of Australia in 2015. Mustered Courage was also nominated for Alternative Country Album of the Year, Group or Duo of the Year, and Bluegrass Recording of the Year at the 44th CMAA Country Music Awards of Australia in 2016. In 2018, the band independently released their fourth studio album titled 'We Played With Fire'.

== Biography ==
=== 2010-2012 Mustered Courage ===
Formed in 2010, Mustered Courage quickly signed to Laughing Outlaw Records whose founder, Stuart Coupe, stated "I've always wanted a band as good as Old Crow Medicine Show on the label and I reckon I've found them." Laughing Outlaw released the band's debut self-titled album in 2011. Mustered Courage won the band a MusicOz Trophy in the Country category at the 2012 Australian Independent Music Awards.

=== 2013-2014: Powerlines ===
Mustered Courage released their second album, Powerlines, in May 2013. The album was produced by ARIA Award-winning producer Jimi Maroudas. Powerlines' three singles – "Standing By Your Side," “Cruel Alibis," and "Powerlines" – enjoyed support from Australia's Country Music Channel. The band also had radio success throughout Australia including being featured on several national radio programs. In 2013 Mustered Courage joined Waleed Aly in The Drawing Room on ABC Radio National where he described them as "Australia's hottest bluegrass band." Powerlines was nominated for Alternative Country Album of the Year; while the album's lone instrumental track, "Allegheny," was nominated for Instrumental of the Year at the 42nd CMAA Country Music Awards of Australia in 2014.

In September 2013, Mustered Courage was invited by the Americana Music Association to perform at their annual Americana Music Festival & Conference in Nashville, Tennessee. The band left Nashville having signed with American management and making connections to Travianna Records who went on to release Powerlines in the US in 2014. The American version of Powerlines includes a duet with fellow Australian Kasey Chambers called "Rosa" that is not on the Australian release.

The band returned to the US in 2014 to support Powerlines by performing nearly 60 shows in 90 days across 43 states. The tour culminated with 10 performances at the International Bluegrass Music Association World of Bluegrass.

Mustered Courage followed up the 2014 tour with several shows in America in 2015 including performances at the John Hartford Memorial Festival, Wintergrass, and the iconic Telluride Bluegrass Festival.

=== 2015-2017: White Lies and Melodies ===
In October 2014, Mustered Courage signed to the newly formed Lost Highway Records Australia under parent label Universal Music Australia. White Lies & Melodies was released in August 2015. The album received very favourable reviews in several publications including 3.5/4 stars in Rolling Stone Australia and 4.5/5 stars in The Brag.

The first single, "Honesty," reached No. 1 on the Country Music Channel Top 50 Countdown on 17 September 2015. The album's second single, "The Future," features a guest duet vocal from American singer Audra Mae who is best known for her vocal work on Avicii's No. 1 single "Addicted To You".

White Lies & Melodies was nominated for ARIA Best Country Album of 2015. It also received three Golden Guitar nominations at the 44th CMAA Country Music Awards of Australia 2016: Alternative Country Album of the Year, Group or Duo of the Year, and Bluegrass Recording of the Year.

=== 2018-2020: We Played With Fire ===
In September 2018, the band released the album, We Played With Fire. On September 29, 2019, the EP Home of Lost Lovers was released. At an as of now unknown date their 2013 album Powerlines was removed from streaming services. While their last time performing together was in 2019, there was some activity in 2020 on their Facebook page.

== Discography ==
=== Albums ===
Title	Album details
Mustered Courage	Released: 2011; Label: Laughing Outlaw Records (LORCD 138)
Powerlines	Released: May 2013; Label: Mustered Courage (MUZCUZ 001)
White Lies & Melodies	Released: August 2015; Label: Lost Highway Australia (4749481)
We Played With Fire	Released: September 2018; Label: Mustered Courage

== Awards and nominations ==
=== Country Music Awards of Australia ===
The Country Music Awards of Australia (CMAA) (also known as the Golden Guitar Awards) is an annual awards night held in January during the Tamworth Country Music Festival, celebrating recording excellence in the Australian country music industry. They have been held annually since 1973.

Year	Nominee / work	Award	Result (wins only)
2015	"Candle Creek"	Instrumental of the Year	Won

=== ARIA Music Awards ===
The ARIA Music Awards are a set of annual ceremonies presented by Australian Recording Industry Association (ARIA), which recognise excellence, innovation, and achievement across all genres of the music of Australia. They commenced in 1987.

Year	Nominee / work	Award	Result	Ref.
2015	White Lies & Melodies	Best Country Album	Nominated	
