= Low Blows (song) =

Single by Meg Mac

from the album Low Blows
- Released: 31 March 2017
- Studio: Niles City Sound
- Length: 3:32
- Label: littleBIGMAN, Inertia
- Songwriter: Meg Mac
- Producer: John O'Mahony

Meg Mac singles chronology
"Never Be" (2015)	"Low Blows" (2017)	"Maybe It's My First Time" (2017)

Music video
- "Low Blows" on YouTube

"Low Blows" is a song recorded by Australian singer Meg Mac. The song was released on 31 March 2017 as the lead single from Mac's debut studio album of the same name. The song was certified platinum in Australia in 2019.

The song was voted in at number 30 on the Triple J Hottest 100, 2017.

Upon release of the album, Mac told V Magazine she wrote the song in her room in Melbourne, saying "I didn't plan on 'Low Blows' being the [lead] single, but whenever people listened to it they thought that it should be. 'Low Blows' is really about looking back and knowing that things would be different if I stood up for myself. It's almost a little bit sad watching yourself and how things could be different."

== Music video ==
The music video for "Low Blows" shows Mac in the Niles City Sound studio in Texas, recording the Low Blows album. The video was released on 20 March 2017.

== Certifications ==
Certifications for "Low Blows"
Region	Certification	Certified units/sales
Australia (ARIA)	Platinum	70,000^{‡}
^{‡} Sales+streaming figures based on certification alone.
