= 2015 ARIA Music Awards =

Annual Australian music awards

- Date: 26 November 2015
- Venue: Star Event Centre, Sydney, New South Wales

Highlights
- Most wins: Tame Impala (5)
- Most nominations: Courtney Barnett (8)
- Website: ariaawards.com.au

Television/radio coverage
- Network: Network Ten

The 29th Annual Australian Recording Industry Association Music Awards (generally known as the ARIA Music Awards or simply the ARIAs) are a series of award ceremonies which include the 2015 ARIA Artisan Awards, ARIA Hall of Fame Awards, ARIA Fine Arts Awards and the ARIA Awards. The latter ceremony took place on 26 November at the Star Event Centre and aired on Network Ten. The event was hosted on stage by Osher Günsberg with Ella Hooper backstage.

The final nominees for ARIA Award categories were announced on 7 October as well as nominees and winners for Fine Arts Awards and Artisan Awards. ARIA opened the public-voted categories Song of the Year, Best International Act, Best Australian Live Act and Best Video, which includes Twitter live vote for Best Australian Live Act. Tame Impala won the most awards with five trophies from six nominations, while Courtney Barnett received the most final nominations with eight categories and won four. Tina Arena was inducted into the ARIA Hall of Fame at the ceremony.

== Performers ==
The following artists performed at the ARIA Music Awards:

- Conrad Sewell
- Flight Facilities
- Hermitude
- Jarryd James
- Jessica Mauboy
- Nathaniel
- Peking Duk
- The Veronicas
- Vance Joy
- Tina Arena
- Ed Sheeran

== Presenters ==
The following presenters handed out trophies at the ceremony:

- Ed Sheeran presented Song Of The Year
- Sheppard presented Best Group
- Joel Creasey presented Best Comedy Release and Best Children's Album
- Guy Sebastian presented Best Pop Release
- James Kerley and Catherine Britt presented Best Adult Contemporary Album and Best Blues and Roots Album
- Veronica & Lewis presented Best Hard Rock/Heavy Metal Album
- Danny Clayton and Carissa Walford presented Best Urban Album
- Adam Brand and Jasmine Rae presented Best Country Album
- Kylie Minogue inducts Tina Arena into the ARIA Hall Of Fame
- James Blunt presented Ed Sheeran for the Diamond Award
- Ian Moss and Phil Jamieson presented Best Rock Album
- Rove McManus presented Best Female Artist
- Ella Hooper presented Best Male Artist
- Scott Tweedie and Olivia Phyland presented Best Australian Live Act
- Iva Davies presented Album Of The Year

== ARIA Hall of Fame inductee ==
2015 ARIA Hall of Fame inductee
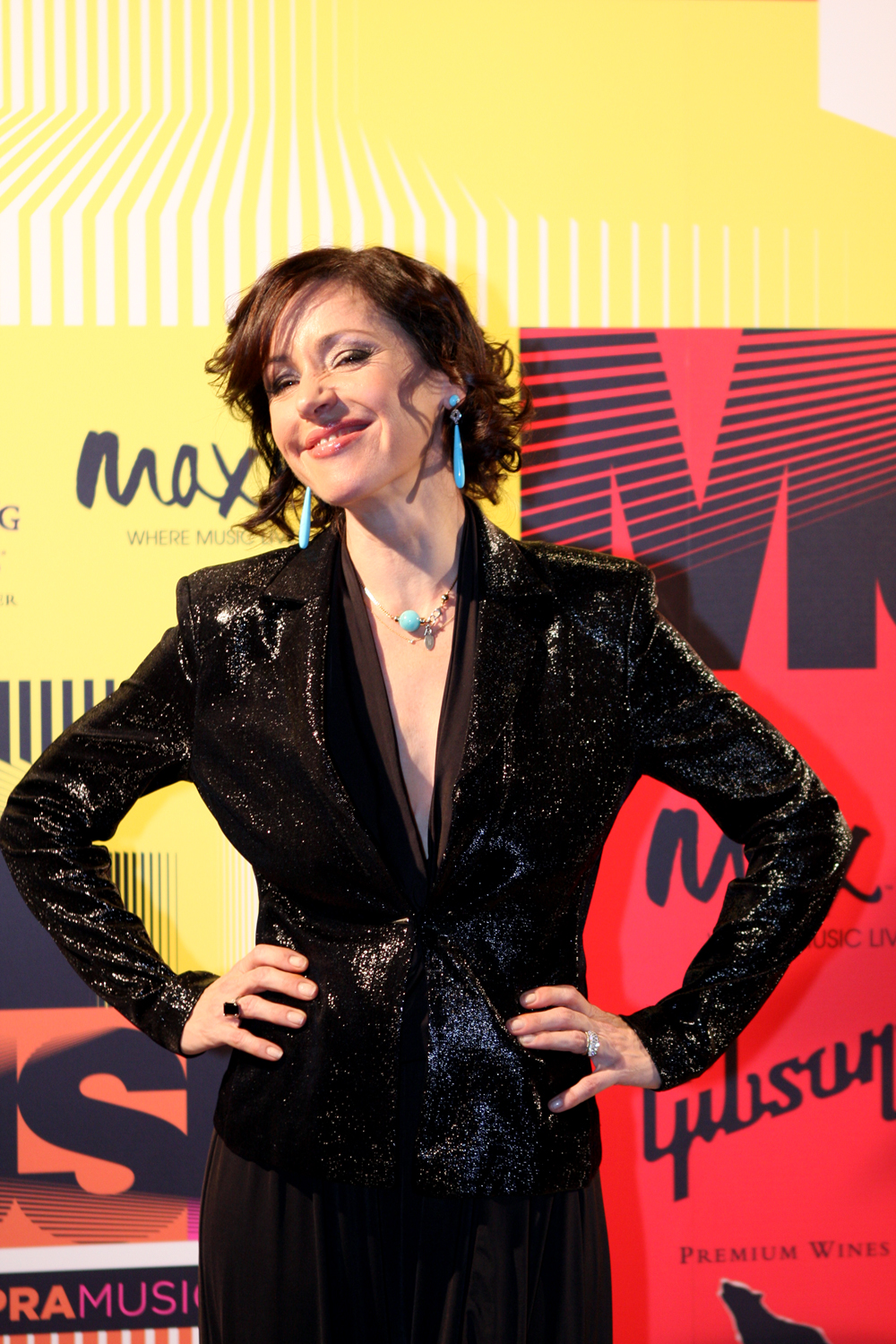
Tina Arena, May 2012

On 25 October ARIA announced that Tina Arena was due to be inducted into their Hall of Fame. To further honour her, and previous inductees, the ARIA Hall of Fame Walk was established on 6 November with Arena as the first artist to be featured. At the ceremony she was introduced by Kylie Minogue, also a Hall of Fame inductee, and was presented the trophy by cyclist, Cadel Evans. Arena performed a new version of her 1994 song, "Chains", which featured Jessica Mauboy and the Veronicas on co-lead vocals. Arena released the performance as a single, which debuted at No. 14 on the ARIA Singles Chart.

In her acceptance speech Arena wanted to "acknowledge that ladies over 40 are still in the game" she specifically named Minogue, Madonna, Jennifer Lopez and Annie Lennox; she continued "Keep doing what you're doing, ladies, because we will decide when it's time for us to stop." She also voiced her concern about support for local artists by broadcasters, "Radio please don't try and meet your Australian quotas because you have to, exceed them because you really want to".

- Tina Arena

== Multiple winners and nominees ==
- Tame Impala – 5 wins from 6 nominations
- Courtney Barnett – 4 wins from 8 nominations
- Vance Joy – 1 win from 7 nominations
- Jarryd James – 1 win from 5 nominations
- Hermitude – 7 nominations
- Gang of Youths – 5 nominations

== Nominees and winners ==
=== ARIA Awards ===
Winners are listed first and highlighted in boldface; other final nominees are listed alphabetically by artists' first name.

Album of the Year	Best Group
**Tame Impala – Currents (Modular / Universal Music Australia)**; Courtney Barnett – Sometimes I Sit and Think, and Sometimes I Just Sit (Milk! Records/Remote Control); Flight Facilities – Down to Earth (Future Classic); Hermitude – Dark Night Sweet Light (Elefant Traks); Vance Joy – Dream Your Life Away (Liberation Music)	**Tame Impala – Currents (Modular / Universal Music Australia)**; 5 Seconds of Summer – LiveSOS (EMI); AC/DC – Rock or Bust (Alberts / Sony Music Entertainment Australia); Hermitude – Dark Night Sweet Light (Elefant Traks / Inertia Music); The Preatures – Blue Planet Eyes (Mercury Australia / Universal Music Australia)
Best Male Artist	Best Female Artist
**Vance Joy – Dream Your Life Away (Liberation Music)**; #1 Dads – "Nominal" (Pieater / Inertia); Daniel Johns – Talk (Eleven / EMI); Guy Sebastian – "Tonight Again" (Sony Music Entertainment Australia); Jarryd James – "Do You Remember" (Jarryd James Music / Dryden Street Limited)	**Courtney Barnett – Sometimes I Sit and Think, and Sometimes I Just Sit (Milk! Records / Remote Control)**; Jessica Mauboy – "Can I Get a Moment?" (Sony Music Entertainment Australia); Meg Mac – MegMac EP (littleBIGMAN / Inertia); Megan Washington – There There (Mercury Australia / Universal Music Australia); Sia – "Elastic Heart" (Inertia Recordings)
Breakthrough Artist	Best Independent Release
**Courtney Barnett – Sometimes I Sit and Think, and Sometimes I Just Sit (Milk! Records / Remote Control)**; Conrad Sewell – "Start Again" (300 Entertainment / Warner Music Australia); Gang of Youths – The Positions (Verge / Sony Music Entertainment Australia); Jarryd James – "Do You Remember" (Jarryd James Music / Dryden Street Limited); Meg Mac – "Never Be" (littleBIGMAN / Inertia)	**Courtney Barnett – Sometimes I Sit and Think, and Sometimes I Just Sit (Milk! Records / Remote Control Records)**; Hermitude – Dark Night Sweet Light (Elefant Traks / Inertia Music); Jarryd James – "Do You Remember" (Jarryd James Music / Dryden Street Limited); Paul Kelly – The Merri Soul Sessions (Gawd Aggie Recordings / Universal Music Australia); Vance Joy – Dream Your Life Away (Liberation Music)
Best Adult Contemporary Album	Best Blues & Roots Album
**Oh Mercy – When We Talk About Love (Casadeldisco Records)**; John Farnham & Olivia Newton-John – Two Strong Hearts Live (Sony Music Entertainment Australia); Megan Washington – There There (Mercury Australia / Universal Music Australia); Paul Kelly – The Merri Soul Sessions (Gawd Aggie Recordings / Universal Music Australia); Szymon – Tigersapp (EMI / Eloper Music)	**C. W. Stoneking – Gon' Boogaloo (King Hokum Records / Caroline Australia)**; Marlon Williams – Marlon Williams (Caroline Australia); The Black Sorrows – Endless Sleep (Head Records); The Waifs – Beautiful You (Jarrah Records / MGM); Tim Rogers & The Bamboos – The Rules of Attraction (Warner Music Australia)
Best Hard Rock/Heavy Metal Album	Best Rock Album
**Northlane – Node (UNFD)**; Born Lion – Final Words (FOUR|FOUR / Universal Music Australia); In Hearts Wake – Skydancer (UNFD); King Parrot – Dead Set (EVP Recordings / Rocket Distribution); Thy Art Is Murder – Holy War (UNFD)	**Tame Impala – Currents (Modular / Universal Music Australia)**; Courtney Barnett – Sometimes I Sit and Think, and Sometimes I Just Sit (Milk! Records / Remote Control Records); Dead Letter Circus – Aesthetis (UNFD); Gang of Youths – The Positions (Verge / Sony Music Entertainment Australia); The Preatures – Blue Planet Eyes (Mercury Australia / Universal Music Australia)
Best Urban Album	Best Country Album
**Seth Sentry – Strange New Past (High Score Records / Inertia)**; Citizen Kay – Demokracy (Asphalt Records / MGM); Hiatus Kaiyote – Choose Your Weapon (Flying Buddha / Sony Music Masterworks); The Meeting Tree – "R U a Cop" (Verge / Sony Music Entertainment Australia); Tuka – Life Death Time Eternal (EMI)	**Shane Nicholson – Hell Breaks Loose (Lost Highway Australia / Universal Music Australia)**; Catherine Britt – Boneshaker (Lost Highway Australia / Universal Music Australia); Lee Kernaghan – Spirit of the Anzacs (ABC Music / Universal Music Australia); Mustered Courage – White Lies and Melodies (Lost Highway Australia / Universal Music Australia); Troy Cassar-Daley – Freedom Ride (Liberation Music)
Best Pop Release	Best Dance Release
**Jarryd James – "Do You Remember" (Jarryd James Music / Dryden Street Limited)**; Conrad Sewell – "Start Again" (300 Entertainment / Warner Music Australia); Sia – "Elastic Heart" (Inertia Recordings); Tame Impala – "Let It Happen" (Modular / Universal Music Australia); Vance Joy – Dream Your Life Away (Liberation Music)	**RÜFÜS – "You Were Right" (Sweat It Out! / Sony Music Entertainment Australia)**; Alison Wonderland – Run (EMI); Flight Facilities – Down to Earth (Future Classic); Hayden James – "Something About You" (Future Classic); Peking Duk feat. SAFIA – "Take Me Over" (Vicious Bitch / Universal Music Australia)
Best Children's Album	Best Comedy Release
**Sam Moran – Play Along with Sam: BOO! (6 Degrees Records / MGM)**; Giggle and Hoot – Hootastic Tunes (ABC Music / Universal Music Australia); Play School – Favourite Things – Songs and Nursery Rhymes from Play School (ABC Music / Universal Music Australia); Rhys Muldoon – Perfect Is the Enemy of Good (ABC Music / Universal Music Australia); The Wiggles – Rock & Roll Preschool (ABC Music / Universal Music Australia)	**Matt Okine – Live at the Enmore Theatre (Century Entertainment)**; Bondi Hipsters – "Fuhck the Bahnks" (ABC Music / Universal Music Australia); Buddy Goode – Songs to Ruin Every Occasion (ABC Music / Universal Music Australia); Ronny Chieng – Chieng Reaction (Century Entertainment); Sammy J & Randy – Live (Head Records)
Song of the Year (Note: Public voted category.)	Best Video
**Conrad Sewell – "Start Again" (300 Entertainment / Warner Music Australia)**; Grace – "You Don't Own Me" feat. G-Eazy (RCA / Sony Music Entertainment Australia); Iggy Azalea – "Trouble" feat. Jennifer Hudson (Mercury Australia / Universal Music Australia); Jarryd James – "Do You Remember" (Jarryd James Music / Dryden Street Limited); Marlisa – "Stand by You" (Sony Music Entertainment Australia); Nathaniel – "Live Louder" (Sony Music Entertainment Australia); Peking Duk – "Take Me Over" feat. SAFIA (Vicious Bitch/Universal Music Australia); Sia – "Elastic Heart" (Inertia Recordings); The Veronicas – "You Ruin Me" (Sony Music Entertainment Australia); Vance Joy – "Georgia" (Liberation Music)	**Matt Sharp & Daniel James for the Veronicas – "You Ruin Me" (Sony Music Entertainment Australia)**; Prad Senanayake for Alison Wonderland – "U Don't Know" feat. Wayne Coyne (EMI); Charlie Ford for Courtney Barnett – "Pedestrian at Best" (Milk! Records / Remote Control Records); Lorin Askill for Daniel Johns – "Aerial Love" (Eleven / EMI); Anthony Rose for Delta Goodrem – "Wings" (Sony Music Entertainment Australia); Clemens Habicht for Flume – "Some Minds" feat. Andrew Wyatt (Future Classic); Kess Broekman-Dattner for Hermitude – "Through the Roof" feat. Young Tapz (Elefant Traks / Inertia Music); Duncan Toombs for Lee Kernaghan – "Spirit of the Anzacs" (ABC Music / Universal Music Australia); Filmery for Shane Nicholson – "Secondhand Man" (Lost Highway Australia); Luci Schroder for Vance Joy – "Georgia" (Liberation Music)
Best Australian Live Act	Best International Artist
**5 Seconds of Summer – Rock Out with Your Socks Out Tour (EMI)**; Courtney Barnett – Sometimes I Sit and Think, and Sometimes I Just Sit Album Tour (Milk! Records / Remote Control Records); Gang of Youths – Gang of Youths National Tour (Verge / Sony Music Entertainment Australia); Hermitude – Dark Night Sweet Light Tour (Elefant Traks / Inertia Music); Hilltop Hoods – Cosby Sweater Australian Tour (Golden Era Records / Universal Music Australia); Nick Cave – Nick Cave Australian Tour (Bad Seed Ltd / Kobalt Label Services); Paul Kelly – The Merri Soul Sessions Tour (Gawd Aggie Recordings / Universal Music Australia); Sheppard – The Bombs Away Tour (Chugg Music & Empire Of Song / MGM Distribution); The Preatures – The Cruel Tour (Mercury Australia / Universal Music Australia); Vance Joy – Dream Your Life Away Tour (Liberation Music)	**One Direction – Four (Syco / Sony Music Entertainment Australia)**; Calvin Harris – Motion (Columbia / Sony Music Entertainment Australia); Ed Sheeran – x (Atlantic UK / Warner Music); Foo Fighters – Sonic Highways (RCA / Sony Music Entertainment Australia); Hozier – Hozier (Columbia / Sony Music Entertainment Australia); James Bay – Chaos and the Calm (Universal / Universal Music Australia); Mark Ronson – Uptown Special (Columbia / Sony Music Entertainment Australia); Meghan Trainor – Title (Epic Records / Sony Music Entertainment Australia); Sam Smith – In the Lonely Hour (Capitol / EMI); Taylor Swift – 1989 (Big Machine Records / Universal Music Australia)

=== Fine Arts Awards ===
Winners are listed first and highlighted in boldface; other final nominees are listed alphabetically by artists' first name. Winners were announced on 7 October.

Best Classical Album
- **Tamara-Anna Cislowska, Peter Sculthorpe: Complete Works for Solo Piano (ABC Classics / Universal Music Australia)**
  - Amy Dickson, Island Songs (ABC Classics / Universal Music Australia)
  - Australian Brandenburg Orchestra, Brandenburg Celebrates (ABC Classics / Universal Music Australia)
  - Grigoryan Brothers, This Time (Which Way Music)
  - Sally Whitwell, I Was Flying (ABC Classics / Universal Music Australia)
Best Jazz Album
- **Barney McAll, Mooroolbark (ABC Jazz / Universal Music Australia)**
  - Allan Browne Quintet, Ithaca Bound (Jazzhead / MGM Distribution)
  - King Gizzard & the Lizard Wizard, Quarters! (Flightless / Remote Control)
  - Paul Grabowsky, Solo (ABC Jazz / Universal Music Australia)
  - Sarah McKenzie, We Could Be Lovers (ABC Music / Universal Music Australia)
Best Original Soundtrack/Cast/Show Album
- **Various Artists, Beat the Drum – Celebrating 40 Years of Triple J (ABC Music / Universal Music Australia)**
  - Ed Kuepper, Last Cab to Darwin – Original Motion Picture Soundtrack (Sony Music Entertainment Australia)
  - Melbourne Symphony Orchestra / Nigel Westlake, Paper Planes – Original Motion Picture Soundtrack (ABC Music / Universal Music Australia)
  - Opera Australia, Bliss (Brett Dean / Amanda Holden / Peter Carey) (ABC Classics / Universal Music Australia)
  - Various Artists, The Water Diviner – Original Motion Picture Soundtrack (Universal Music Australia)
Best World Music Album
- **Gurrumul, The Gospel Album (Skinnyfish Music / MGM)**
  - Baby et Lulu, Album Deux (Independent / MGM)
  - Christine Anu, Island Christmas (Social Family Records / Universal Music Australia / The Orchard)
  - Genevieve Lacey and James Crabb, Heard This and Thought of You (ABC Classics / Universal Music Australia)
  - Joseph Tawadros, Truth Seekers, Lovers and Warriors (ABC Music / Universal Music Australia)

=== Artisan Awards ===
Winners are listed first and highlighted in boldface; other final nominees are listed alphabetically by artists' first name. Winners were announced on 7 October.

Best Cover Art
- **Courtney Barnett for Courtney Barnett, Sometimes I Sit and Think, and Sometimes I Just Sit (Milk! Records / Remote Control)**
  - Bjenny Montero for Pond, Man It Feels Like Space Again (EMI)
  - Daniel Johns, Aref and Peter Salmon-Lomas for Daniel Johns, Talk (Eleven / EMI)
  - Nathan Johnson for Gang of Youths, The Positions (Verge / Sony Music Entertainment Australia)
  - Timothy Lovett for Flight Facilities, Down to Earth (Future Classic)
Engineer of the Year
- **Kevin Parker for Tame Impala, Currents (Modular / Universal Music Australia)**
  - Adrian Breakspear and Peter Holz for Gang of Youths, Radioface (Verge / Sony Music Entertainment Australia)
  - Mitch Kenny for Hermitude, Dark Night Sweet Light (Elefant Traks / Inertia Music)
  - Nick Didia for The Waifs, Beautiful You (Jarrah Records / MGM)
  - Virginia Read for Australian Brandenburg Orchestra, Brandenburg Celebrates (ABC Classics / Universal Music Australia)
Producer of the Year
- **Kevin Parker for Tame Impala, Currents (Modular / Universal Music Australia)**
  - Daniel Johns and Damn Moroda for Daniel Johns, Talk (Eleven / EMI)
  - Garth Porter for Lee Kernaghan, Spirit of the Anzacs (ABC Music / Universal Music Australia)
  - Luke Dubber and Angus Stuart for Hermitude, Dark Night Sweet Light (Elefant Traks / Inertia Music)
  - Nick Didia for The Waifs, Beautiful You (Jarrah Records / MGM)

== See also ==
- Music of Australia
