= Too Far Gone =

Too Far Gone may refer to:

- "Too Far Gone" (The Walking Dead), a 2013 television episode
- Too Far Gone (Cane Hill album), 2018
- Too Far Gone (Catherine Britt album), 2006
- "Too Far Gone" (song), by Lisa Scott-Lee, 2003
- "Too Far Gone?", a song by Metallica, 2023
- "Too Far Gone", a song by the All-American Rejects from The All-American Rejects, 2002
- "Too Far Gone", a song by Bradley Cooper from A Star Is Born soundtrack, 2018
- "Too Far Gone", a song by Kesha from Gag Order, 2023
- "Too Far Gone", a song by Neil Young from Freedom, 1989
- "Too Far Gone", a song by Status Quo from Rockin' All Over the World, 1977
