= Boneshaker =

Boneshaker can refer to:

- Boneshaker (Alton Towers), an amusement park ride in Staffordshire, England
- Boneshaker (bicycle)
- Boneshaker (novel), by Cherie Priest
- Bone Shaker, a 2006 Hot Wheels car
- Boneshaker (Catherine Britt album), by Australian singer Catherine Britt
- Boneshaker (Airbourne album), by Australian rock music ensemble Airbourne
