= Maybe It's My First Time =

Single by Meg Mac

from the album Low Blows
- Released: 2 June 2017
- Studio: Niles City Sound
- Length: 3:33
- Label: littleBIGMAN, Inertia
- Songwriter: Meg Mac
- Producer: John O'Mahony

Meg Mac singles chronology
"Low Blows" (2017)	"Maybe It's My First Time" (2017)	"Don't Need Permission" (2017)

"Maybe It's My First Time" is a song recorded by Australian singer Meg Mac. The song was released on 2 June 2017 as the second single from Mac's debut studio album of the same name. The song peaked at number 92 on the ARIA Charts in July 2017 and was certified platinum in Australia in 2024.

Upon release, Meg Mac said "'Maybe it's My First Time' is about trying to get through a bad time. When you're hurt, you can keep going over and over the pain in your head and drive yourself crazy. I wanted to stop all that and only look back once and be done with it. To cruise past my pain instead of living in it".

The song was voted in at number 30 on the Triple J Hottest 100, 2017.

== Reception ==
Nat Tencic from Triple J called the song "another raw, emotive soul number... with a rich, gospel-infused ballad."

== Charts ==
Weekly chart performance for "Maybe It's My First Time"
Chart (2017)	Peak position
Australia (ARIA)	92

== Certifications ==
Certifications for "Maybe It's My First Time"
Region	Certification	Certified units/sales
Australia (ARIA)	Platinum	70,000^{‡}
^{‡} Sales+streaming figures based on certification alone.
