= Lachlan Bryan & the Wildes =

Australian music group

Lachlan Bryan and the Wildes
- Origin: Melbourne, Victoria, Australia
- Genres: Alternative country; Americana
- Years active: 2008–2011, 2013–present
- Labels: Select Global; WJO; ABC; Social Family
- Members: Lachlan Bryan; Mat Duniam; Shaun Ryan
- Website: http://www.lachlanbryan.com

Lachlan Bryan and the Wildes (formerly known as The Wildes) are an alt-country music group from Melbourne, Australia. The group received attention in their home country for debut album Ballad of a Young Married Man, released in 2009 through Sydney record label Select Global before briefly disbanding.

The band reformed in 2013 under the name Lachlan Bryan & the Wildes and released the album Black Coffee in September of that year. The album won the group their first Golden Guitar award and Music Victoria awards.

== History ==
=== 2008–2011: The Wildes and Ballad of a Young Married Man ===
Lachlan Bryan and The Wildes grew up in the south-eastern suburbs of Melbourne, before moving into the inner-city music scene.

They recorded and released their debut record with producer Jonathan Burnside in 2009. Tim Ritchie from Australian Broadcasting Corporation called it one of his favourite albums of 2009.

In late 2009 The Wildes composed and recorded music for Sean Genders' short film Edge of Reality, produced by Mat Hearne (Wolf Creek) and starring Australian screen icon John Jarratt.

After two years of solid touring, The Wildes began work on a follow-up album titled Sweet Bird of Youth. The recordings were made in Adelaide with Burnside again at the helm. The band were unhappy with their performance in the studio and abandoned the record in early 2011 and the group disbanded.

=== 2012: Lachlan Bryan solo Shadow of the Gun ===
Lachlan Bryan signed a solo deal with new label Core Music and released the album Shadow of the Gun in January 2012. Bill Chambers said "While Lachlan Bryan's music is fresh and original, it reminds me of my favourite singer songwriters. He's the real deal." and Catherine Britt said "Unquestionably one of the most talented and exciting up and coming singer songwriters." Members of The Wildes continued to tour with Bryan to support this album.

=== 2013–2019: Black Coffee ===
In 2013, the group, reformed under the name Lachlan Bryan & the Wildes. They completed Black Coffee with producer Rod McCormack at The Music Cellar on the NSW central coast in June of that year, releasing the album in September 2013. The title track is a tribute to Bryan's grandfather who taught him to take his coffee "sweet as sin, hot as hell, and black as pitch." Black Coffee debuted at number 12 on the ARIA Australian Album Chart and reached number 4 on the ARIA Country Album chart.

At the 2014 Country Music Awards of Australia, Black Coffee was won the Golden Guitar for Alternative Country Album of the Year. Later in 2014, Black Coffee won the Music Victoria Awards for Best Country Album.

In September 2015, the group released The Mountain. Australian Broadcasting Corporation said it's "Another great album of unusual songs and well crafted arrangements."

In February 2018, the group released Some Girls (Quite) Like Country Music, with Lachlan saying "We wanted to make an adult-sounding country record."

=== 2020–present: Social Family Records ===
In August 2020, the group announced they had signed with Social Family Records.

In April 2021, the group released Nearest Misses Live, an album recorded in 2019. Lachlan Bryan said "These recordings really caught us in our best form and I don't think we really appreciated that at the time. It's a set of audience favourites and we played them really well - we couldn't be prouder of how they've come up". The album debuted at number 38 on the ARIA Chart.

In September 2021, Lachlan Bryan and The Wildes album, As Long as It's Not Us debuted at number 30 on the ARIA Albums Chart.

In 2021, Bryan collaborated with Catherine Britt and formed The Pleasures. The Pleasures released their debut single "The Beginning of the End" in January 2022 and album of the same name on 4 August 2023. The album debuted at number 20 on the Australian ARIA Country Albums chart.

== Members ==
- Lachlan Bryan – vocals, guitar
- Mat Duniam – drums, vocals
- Damian Cafarella – guitars, drums
- Shaun Ryan – bass

== Discography ==
=== Studio albums ===
List of studio albums, with release date and label shown
Title	Details	Peak chart positions
Title	Details	AUS
Ballad of a Young Married Man (as The Wildes)	Released: 2009; Label: Select Global (TW102)	—
Black Coffee	Released: September 2013; Label: WJO	—
The Mountain	Released: September 2015; Label: ABC Music (4749806)	—
Some Girls (Quite) Like Country Music	Released: February 2018; Label: ABC Music (6738582)	—
As Long as It's Not Us	Released: 17 September 2021; Label: Social Family Records (SFR0124); Formats: CD, DD, streaming	30

=== Live albums ===
List of albums, with release date and label shown
Title	Details	Peak chart positions
Title	Details	AUS
Nearest Misses Live	Released: April 2021; Label: Social Family (SFR0136); Formats: CD, DD, streaming	38

== Awards and nominations ==
=== Country Music Awards (CMAA) ===
The Country Music Awards of Australia (CMAA) (also known as the Golden Guitar Awards) is an annual awards night held in January during the Tamworth Country Music Festival, celebrating recording excellence in the Australian country music industry. They have been held annually since 1973. Lachlan Bryan & the Wildes has won one award.

Year	Nominee / work	Award	Result (wins only)
2014	Black Coffee	Alternative Country Album of the Year	Won

=== Music Victoria Awards ===
The Music Victoria Awards, are an annual awards night celebrating Victorian music. They commenced in 2005.

Year	Nominee / work	Award	Result	Ref.
2014	Black Coffee	Best Country Album	Won	
2021	Lachlan Bryan & the Wildes	Best Country Act	Nominated	
2022	Lachlan Bryan & the Wildes	Best Country Work	Nominated	
