= Little WildFlower =

Little Wildflower

Studio album by Catherine Britt
- Released: 14 January 2008
- Label: ABC Music / Universal Music Australia

Catherine Britt chronology
Too Far Gone (2006)	Little Wildflower (2008)	Catherine Britt (2010)

Little Wildflower is the third studio album by Australian country music singer Catherine Britt. The album was released in January 2008 and peaked at number 44 on the ARIA Charts.

At the ARIA Music Awards of 2008, the album was nominated for the ARIA Award for Best Country Album.

== Track listing ==
No.	Title	Writer(s)	Length
1.	"Little Wild Flower"		3:31
2.	"Not Your Cinderella"		3:32
3.	"What I Did Last Night"		3:56
4.	"Dirt Cheap"		3:43
5.	"If Only He Were You"		3:31
6.	"You Run"		3:23
7.	"That Ain’t Me"		3:50
8.	"Somewhere Over the Rainbow"	Harold Arlen; Yip Harburg	2:42
9.	"Lucky Girl"		2:48
10.	"You’re the One I Love"		3:04
11.	"Drive In Movie"		3:59
12.	"Bruised"		2:58
13.	"The Simple Life" (Deluxe Edition bonus track)
14.	"Swingin' Door (Alternative version)" (Deluxe Edition bonus track)

Deluxe Edition Bonus DVD
No.	Title	Length
1.	"Little Wild Flower" (Music Video)
2.	"Little Wild Flower" (Live at the 2008 Telstra Road to Tamworth Finals)
3.	"What I Did Last Night" (Music Video)
4.	"What I Did Last Night" (Live at the 2008 Telstra Road to Tamworth Finals)
5.	"Lucky Girl" (Music Video)

== Charts ==
=== Weekly charts ===
Chart (2008)	Peak position
Australian Albums Chart	73

=== Year-end charts ===
Chart (2008)	Rank
Australian Country Albums Chart	38

== Release history ==
Country	Date	Format	Label	Catalogue	Version
Australia	14 January 2008	Digital download, CD	ABC Music / Universal Music Australia	1777152	Standard
Australia	2008	Digital download, CD + DVD	ABC Music / Universal Music Australia	1792306	Deluxe
