= Give Me My Name Back =

2018 song by Meg Mac

Single by Meg Mac

from the album Hope
- Released: 12 October 2018
- Length: 3:08
- Label: littleBIGMAN, Inertia
- Songwriter: Megan Sullivan McInerney: Myles Wootton

Meg Mac singles chronology
"Don't Need Permission" (2018)	"Give Me My Name Back" (2018)	"Something Tells Me" (2019)

Music video
- "Give Me My Name Back" on YouTube

"Give Me My Name Back" is a song recorded by Australian singer Meg Mac. It was released on 12 October 2018. It is the lead single from her second studio album Hope, which was released on 7 June 2019.

Upon release Mac told Billboard about how the song is more than a feminist anthem: "'Give Me My Name Back' is a song for those who have suffered emotional and physical abuse, it's for the women who are standing up and speaking out, those discriminated against in the LGBTQI community, the Indigenous people of Australia and the children abused by the church. It's for everyone who has lost an important part of themselves and need to reclaim their identity, dignity and self-worth in order to move forward with their lives."

== Critical reception ==
Al Newstead from ABC called the song her "most empowering anthem yet" saying "It's a bit of a change from the raw, vintage-sounding soul of her debut album, Low Blows. There's more space and synthetic sounds, all grounded by Meg's foundation-shifting set of pipes. The result is a rallying cry, an empowering anthem encouraging others to join in solidarity and take a stand."

Matthew Forbes from Outlet Mag said: "'Give Me My Name Back' achieves its desire for a wide-reaching message through its direct and all-encompassing lyricism, which are given even more weight by Meg's characteristically enthralling vocal performance. The track ventures forward in time from the vintage soul that defined her debut album to the more synthetic and futuristic territory she's explored on tracks like "Grandma’s Hands", resulting in an instrumental that's rich in texture. Despite this, the song, much like its lyrics, is at its most powerful in the simple moments – specifically, the bridge, in which the instrumental is reduced to a drum beat, letting the stirring lyrics and gorgeous harmonies take the forefront."

== Music video ==
The music video for "Give Me My Name Back" was produced, directed and edited by Claudia Sangiorgi Dalimore and released on 11 October 2018. The music video had an all-female cast and crew.

== Charts ==
Chart (2018)	Peak position
Australian Independent Chart (AIR)	2
