= I'm Not Coming Back =

2019 song by Meg Mac

Single by Meg Mac

from the album Hope
- Released: 12 April 2019
- Length: 3:06
- Label: littleBIGMAN, Inertia
- Songwriter: Megan Sullivan McInerney
- Producer: Myles Wootton

Meg Mac singles chronology
| "Something Tells Me" (2019) | "I'm Not Coming Back" (2019) | "Hope" (2019) |

"I'm Not Coming Back" is a song recorded by Australian singer Meg Mac. It was released on 12 April 2019 as the third single from her second studio album Hope.

Upon release, Meg Mac said, "Everyone has a person in their life that's only around when they need something. You only hear from them when they need you; they only call you when they're down. So, you pick them up and try to take a little pain away. But when you need them, they're never around."

In 2025, the song was certified gold by the Australian Recording Industry Association (ARIA).

== Certifications ==
Certifications for "I'm Not Coming Back"
| Region | Certification | Certified units/sales |
|---|---|---|
| Australia (ARIA) | Gold | 35,000^{‡} |
^{‡} Sales+streaming figures based on certification alone.
