= Always Never Enough =

Studio album by Catherine Britt
- Released: 10 August 2012
- Venue: Cedar Creek Recording
- Label: ABC Music / Universal Music Australia
- Producer: Bill Chambers, Catherine Britt

Catherine Britt chronology
Catherine Britt (2010)	Always Never Enough (2012)	The Hillbilly Pickin' Ramblin' Girl So Far... (2013)

Always Never Enough is the fifth studio album by Australian country music singer Catherine Britt. The album was released in August 2012 and peaked at number 44 on the ARIA Charts. The album was supported by a national tour across June and July 2012.

At the ARIA Music Awards of 2012, the album was nominated for the ARIA Award for Best Country Album.

At the AIR Awards of 2013, the album won Best Independent Country Album.

== Background and release ==
Since the release of her last self titled album in 2010, Britt won numerous awards for songwriting; including "Sweet Emmylou" which won 'Single of the Year' at the 2011 Country Music Awards of Australia. The song came in second place in the 2011 Vanda & Young Songwriting Competition, behind Kimbra, who took home first prize for "Cameo Lover". "Sweet Emmylou" also placed second in the Americana category in the 2011 International Songwriting Competition, which had over 16,000 entries from 112 countries.

In 2012, Britt performed over the weekend at Song Summit's Women of Vanda and Young showcase along with Megan Washington and hosts the national TV show 'Alt Country' on the Country Music Channel. Britt also toured with Beccy Cole, co-headlined at CMC Rocks the Hunter and co-hosted the 7th Australian Music Prize Awards.

Always Never Enough was recorded in Austin, Texas and features include Grammy Award-winning producer and musician Lloyd Maines, Carrie Rodriguez, Lucinda Williams, Gurf Morlix, Jimmy LaFave, Eliza Gilkyson, Carrie Rodriguez, Bobby Kallus, Glenn Schuetz, Phil Hurley, John Silva, Chip Dolan, Ray Bonneville and John Blundell. The album was announced in May 2012 with the album's lead single, "Always Never Enough", released on 4 June.

== Track listing ==
No.	Title	Writer(s)	Length
1.	"Always Never Enough"	Catherine Britt	3:21
2.	"Charlestown Road"	Britt	3:09
3.	"Addicted to the Pain"	Britt; Bill Chambers	3:34
4.	"Sally Bones"	Britt	4:39
5.	"There's Gotta Be More"	Britt	3:25
6.	"I'm Your Biggest Fan"	Britt	3:54
7.	"A Good Few Years"	Britt	3:05
8.	"Troubled Man"	Britt	4:07
9.	"Our Town"	Britt	2:52
10.	"Our Town"	Britt	6:27
11.	"Thank God There Is a Train"	Britt; Chambers	3:54
12.	"She Ain't Going Nowhere" (featuring Guy Clark)	Guy Clark	4:00
13.	"Two Steps"	Britt	3:46

Acoustic Sessions Recorded Live at the ABC Studios
No.	Title	Writer(s)	Length
14.	"Sweet Emmylou" (acoustic)	Britt	3:58
15.	"Charlestown Road" (acoustic)	Britt	3:27
16.	"Always Never Enough" (acoustic)	Britt	3:32
17.	"A Good Few Years" (acoustic)	Britt	2:30
18.	"I'm Your Biggest Fan" (acoustic)	Britt	4:04

== Charts ==
=== Weekly charts ===
Chart (2012)	Peak position
Australian Albums (ARIA)	44

=== Year-end charts ===
Chart (2012)	Rank
Australian Country Albums Chart	50

== Release history ==
Country	Date	Format	Label	Catalogue
Australia	10 August 2012	Digital download, CD	ABC Music / Universal Music Australia	3711147 / 3711894
