= Catherine Britt =

Australian country music artist

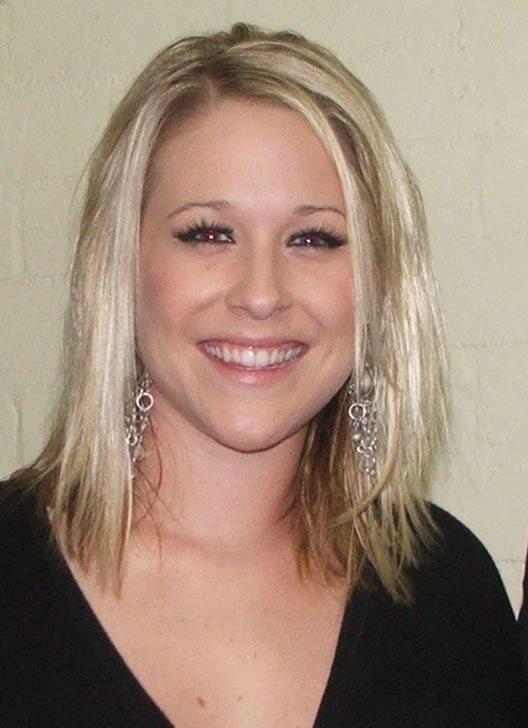
- Britt at radio station 2ARM FM92.1, Armidale. Photo by Bruce Howlett.

Background information
- Born: Catherine Elisabeth Britt; 31 December 1984 (age 41); Newcastle, New South Wales, Australia
- Genre: Country
- Occupation: Musician
- Instruments: Vocals; rhythm guitar
- Years active: 1996–present
- Labels: ABC; RCA Nashville
- Website: catherinebritt.com

Catherine Elisabeth Britt (born 31 December 1984) is an Australian country music artist who has had success in both her native Australia and in the United States. She started her career in Newcastle in 1999, she moved to Nashville from 2002 to 2008 and then returned to Australia. Britt has had three singles in top 40 on the US Billboard Hot Country Songs charts with "The Upside of Being Down", her highest, peaking at No. 36 in 2004. Britt has released seven studio albums in Australia, where all seven have appeared on the ARIA Albums Chart, Too Far Gone (16 January 2006), Little Wildflower (14 January 2008), Catherine Britt (28 May 2010) and Always Never Enough (10 August 2012). All five albums have been nominated for ARIA Music Awards in the category, Best Country Album.

At the Country Music Awards of Australia Britt has won four Golden Guitar trophies, Female Artist of the Year for "What I Did Last Night" (2009), "Charlestown Road" (2013) and "Boneshaker" (2016), and Single of the Year for "Sweet Emmylou" (2011). Britt married her then-partner, James Beverley, in October 2013; the couple have two children and are now separated. Britt was diagnosed with breast cancer in early 2015; she underwent surgery and chemotherapy.

== Biography ==
Catherine Elisabeth Britt was born on 31 December 1984 in Newcastle. Her father, Steve Britt, is a school counsellor and her mother, Anne, is a teacher-librarian; they have three older sons. Steve has a vast collection of records, especially material by country music artists. From the age of ten Britt was singing in her home drawing inspiration from Dolly Parton, Loretta Lynn and Hank Williams. Britt was a reluctant music student, "I got singing lessons for a while and hated it ... I hate people telling me what to do with my music and stuff. They used to tell me to sing all this Natalie Imbruglia stuff so I quit them. I had guitar lessons from the same guy and he taught me the basic chords and I gave that up once I knew all the basic chords, thinking that will do me."

Her first effort at song writing, "Guardian Angel", occurred when she was 11, she later recalled, "it was pretty bad". In the following year her parents took her to meet Australian country musician, Bill Chambers, who invited Britt on stage to duet on "T. B. Blues", a cover version of Jimmie Rodgers' original. A week later Britt sang solo at a Merle Haggard tribute concert in Sydney presented by Chambers.

In 1999 Britt independently released her debut four-track extended play, In the Pines, which was produced by Chambers – she was aged 14. It included the track, "That Don't Bother Me!", co-written with Chambers' daughter, Kasey – who also provided backing vocals. Britt preferred to write on her own, however, she enjoyed working with Kasey "because we were such great friends, and we knew each other and we knew we both were coming from the same place when it came to music."

Britt issued her first studio album, Dusty Smiles and Heartbreak Cures, on 16 May 2001, also independently and produced by Bill Chambers. It contained "a half-dozen originals, as well as covers of [Williams] and [Haggard]". She then signed to ABC Music/ABC Country to re-release the album on 11 March 2002. In May Elton John, who was touring Australia, heard her album; he met Britt and recommended her to industry contacts in the United States. Dusty Smiles and Heartbreak Cures appeared on the ARIA Country Chart in July that year, peaking at No. 18. At the ARIA Music Awards of 2002 Britt received her first nomination for Country Album of the Year. Late in 2002 Britt, for three weeks, supported the Australian leg of a tour by Chris Isaak. Her backing band included Kurt Bailey on drums and Ben Conicella on bass guitar.

Britt attended the Country Music Awards of Australia, held in Tamworth, in January 2003 and told Debbie Kruger of Australasian Performing Right Association (APRA) of her writing process for the album, "The way I write songs is a bit strange ... I just sit down and it'll be five minutes, and the song will just come out on paper, and then I'll have to look back on it and go, 'Right, does this make sense?' I hardly ever change my words, ever, I always just write them down and that's it. That real five-minute rush, I guess." For some lyrics she would check with her parents "I really didn't even know what it meant. And that happens a lot of the time for me, I have to go to Mum and Dad and say, 'Does this make sense?' And every time it does." Brendan Hutchens of TV series, George Negus Tonight, interviewed Britt for "Episode 5", broadcast on 5 March 2003. She described touring with Isaak "It's been great, he's been kind to me and his whole band's really good to me, so it's better than I thought".

In 2004, she moved to Nashville, Tennessee, and was soon signed to RCA Nashville for international releases. Her US debut single, "The Upside of Being Down", peaked at No. 36 on the Billboard Hot Country Songs in August that year. In July 2005 Britt and John released a country music duet, "Where We Both Say Goodbye", which was co-written by Britt with Jerry Salley. The single entered at No. 49 on the Hot Country Songs – John's first appearance on that chart.

Britt's second album, Too Far Gone, was released in Australia on 16 January 2006. It had been recorded in Nashville with Chambers co-producing with Keith Stegall (Alan Jackson, George Jones, Jamie O'Neal). Session musicians include Kenny Chesney on backing vocals, Stuart Duncan on fiddle and mandolin, Mark Fain on upright bass, Paul Franklin on steel guitar, Rob Ickes on dobro, Brent Mason on guitars (acoustic, electric), Dave Pomeroy on bass guitar, Hargus "Pig" Robbins on piano, John Wesley Ryles on backing vocals, Bruce Watkins on acoustic guitar and Glenn Worf on bass guitar. In Australia the album reached No. 47 on the ARIA Albums Chart and No. 3 on the related Country Chart. Tim Noel of comcast.net opined "may not be strong enough to share with your friends as far as an introduction to [Britt]. There is some strong material here such as 'Swingin' Door' and 'Poor Man's Pride', but it's filled with mediocre stuff that sounds like late 90s material... I know Britt has a more rocking side that should hopefully come out in her upcoming [album]."

At the ARIA Music Awards of 2006 Britt, with Too Far Gone, received her second nomination for Country Album of the Year. From May to October 2007 Britt was an opening act for a co-headlining tour of the US by Alan Jackson with Brooks & Dunn. Britt recorded her third studio album, Little Wildflower, with Brett Beavers producing (Dierks Bentley) in Nashville. It was released on 14 January 2008 in Australia, which reached No. 6 on the ARIA Country Albums chart; it provided Britt with her third ARIA Award nomination in Best Country Album in 2008.

Its lead single, "What I Did Last Night", appeared in May 2007 and peaked at No. 39 on the US Hot Country Songs chart. When Brooks & Dunn toured Australia, during March 2008, they were supported by Britt. By April 2008 Britt was dropped from RCA's roster without releasing any albums in the US market. Britt returned to live in Newcastle by 2009.

Britt contacted Chambers to produce her next album, Catherine Britt, and he co-opted his then-son-in-law, Shane Nicholson, as co-producer. It was recorded at Sing Sing Studios in Melbourne. The track, "Call You Back Town", which Britt co-wrote with Ashley Monroe, relates to her experiences in Nashville; Britt recalled "[it] can be a very harsh place at times, wonderful place too ... I saw both sides of it. This song was a result of seeing that side at certain stages and how I felt about that. No, they never call you back – you call and leave a message and they never get back to you." The album, which reached No. 5 on the ARIA Country Albums chart, was also nominated for Best Country Album in 2010 at the ARIA Awards ceremony.

Britt's fifth studio album, Always Never Enough, was released on 10 August 2012, which peaked at No. 44 on the ARIA Albums Chart and No. 3 on its Country Albums Chart. The album was recorded in Austin, Texas at Cedar Creek Studios with Britt and Chambers co-producing. Sophie Hamley of Jolene: The Country Music Blog felt it was "her masterpiece" with "[n]ot a single song that I want to skip over or not pay close attention to." Also in 2012 Britt received her fifth nomination for Best Country Album at the ARIA Awards ceremony.

In November 2012 Britt, Chambers and Tim Rogers (of You Am I) formed a group, The Hillbilly Killers, as a side project to perform "[s]ad songs, high and lonesome songs, songs with an ache and a hurt undeniable, timeless even. But [Chambers] wanted those songs to have an edge too. Something a little unhinged. Something dark and unruly." Other members were James Gillard, Michael Muchow on guitar and Shane O'Mara on guitar. Their official debut gig was at the Tamworth Country Music Festival in January 2013.

The group toured Australia's east coast and issued their debut single, "They Call Us the Hillbilly Killers", by March that year. Natalie Salvo of The AU Review caught their performance at The Basement in Sydney on 24 April 2013, Britt Chambers and Rogers each had a brief solo set before the trio were joined by two more musicians, Gillard on double bass and backing vocals, and Paul Novosel on drums. Salvo felt "the now-quintet used everything from guitars to banjo, double bass, slide guitar and stomp box to create just the right mix of homespun charm, venomous love notes, down-to-earth storytelling and country hoedowns." Britt provides rhythm guitar and backing vocals with occasional lead vocals.

On 18 November 2013 Britt issued her first compilation album, The Hillbilly Pickin' Ramblin' Girl So Far..., on ABC Music and Universal Music Australia. The album reached No. 20 on the ARIA Country Albums Chart. A new track, "Who Cares", was issued as a single. In mid-2014 Britt was featured vocalist on a single by Graham Rodger, "Reach Out", which appeared on his album, Dust and Leather. The charity single was provided for the Trans Help Foundation, which highlights the well-being of truck drivers. between 2013 and 2015, Britt filled in as host of Saturday Night Country on ABC Local Radio while regular host, Felicity Urquhart took a temporary leave of absence.

In 2021, Britt collaborated with Lachlan Bryan and formed The Pleasures. The Pleasures released their debut single "The Beginning of the End" in January 2022 and album of the same name on 4 August 2023. The album debuted at number 20 on the Australian ARIA Country Albums chart.

=== Personal life ===
In May 2015 Britt was diagnosed with breast cancer. Amidst surgery and chemotherapy, her wedding re-enactment went ahead in October the same year, celebrating the couple's second anniversary. Both Britt's mother, Anne Britt, and her mother-in-law, Lee Beverley, were subsequently diagnosed and treated for breast cancer. By September 2019 Britt and Beverley had two children.

In January 2016 she won her fourth Golden Guitar at the Country Music Awards of Australia, for Female Artist of the Year ("Boneshaker").

== Discography ==
=== Studio albums ===
List of studio albums with selected chart positions
Title	Album details	Peak chart positions	
Title	Album details	AUS	AUS Country
Dusty Smiles and Heartbreak Cures	Release date: 16 May 2001; Label: ABC Music; Format: CD	—	18
Too Far Gone	Release date: 16 January 2006; Label: ABC Music/Warner Music Australia; Format: CD	47	3
Little WildFlower	Release date: 14 January 2008; Label: ABC Music; Format: CD	73	6
Catherine Britt	Release date: 28 May 2010; Label: ABC Music; Format: CD, digital download	73	5
Always Never Enough	Release date: 10 August 2012; Label: ABC Music; Format: CD, digital download	44	3
Boneshaker	Release date: 1 May 2015; Label: Lost Highway Records Australia; Format: CD, digital download	41	5
Catherine Britt & the Cold Cold Hearts	Release date: 13 July 2018; Label: Universal Music Australia; Format: CD, digital download	62	—
Home Truths	Release date: 15 January 2021; Label: Catherine Britt; Format: CD, digital download	—	7
The Hardest Thing	Release date: 23 January 2026; Label: Catherine Britt; Format: CD, digital download	54	9
"—" denotes releases that did not chart

=== Compilation albums ===
List of compilation albums with selected chart positions
Title	Album details	Peak chart positions
Title	Album details	AUS Country
The Hillbilly Pickin' Ramblin' Girl So Far...	Release date: 18 November 2013; Label: ABC Music/Universal Music Australia; Format: CD	20

=== Extended plays ===
List of extended plays
Title	Extended play details
In the Pines	Release date: 1999; Label: Self-released; Format: CD
CMC Songs and Stories	Release date: 18 October 2019; Label: Lost Highway, Universal Music; Format: CD, Digital download, streaming

=== Charting singles ===
List of charting singles, with selected chart positions, showing year released and album name
Title	Year	Peak chart positions	Album
Title	Year	US Country	Album
"The Upside of Being Down"	2004	36	Too Far Gone
"Where We Both Say Goodbye" (with Elton John)	2005	38	Non-album single
"What I Did Last Night"	2007	39	Little Wildflower
"—" denotes a recording that did not chart or was not released in that territory.

== Awards and nominations ==
=== AIR Awards ===
The Australian Independent Record Awards (commonly known informally as AIR Awards) is an annual awards night to recognise, promote and celebrate the success of Australia's Independent Music sector.

Year	Nominee / work	Award	Result
2013	Always Never Enough	Best Independent Country Album	Won

=== APRA Awards ===
Year	Category	For	Result
2011	Country Work of the Year	"Can't Change a Thing" (Catherine Britt, Melanie Horsnell)	Nominated
2013	Country Work of the Year	"Charlestown Road" (Britt)	Nominated

=== ARIA Music Awards ===
The ARIA Music Awards are a set of annual ceremonies presented by Australian Recording Industry Association (ARIA), which recognise excellence, innovation, and achievement across all genres of the music of Australia. They commenced in 1987.Catherine Britt has been nominated for ARIA Award for Best Country Album for all first six studio albums.

Year	Nominee / work	Award	Result
2002	Dusty Smiles and Heartbreak Cures	Best Country Album	Nominated
2006	Too Far Gone	Best Country Album	Nominated
2008	Little Wildflower	Best Country Album	Nominated
2010	Catherine Britt	Best Country Album	Nominated
2010	Catherine Britt	Most Popular Australian Artist	Shortlisted
2012	Always Never Enough	Best Country Album	Nominated
2015	Boneshaker	Best Country Album	Nominated

=== CMAA Country Music Awards of Australia ===
The Country Music Awards of Australia were established in 1973 and have been staged by the Country Music Association of Australia (CMAA) since 1992). Catherine Britt has won four Golden Guitar trophies, Female Artist of the Year in 2009, 2013 and 2016, and Single of the Year in 2011.

Year	Nominee / work	Award	Result
2006	"Poor Man's Pride" (directed by Ross Wood)	Video Clip of the Year	Nominated
2007	Too Far Gone	Album of the Year	Nominated
2007	"Too Far Gone"	Single of the Year	Nominated
2007	Catherine Britt – Too Far Gone	Female Artist of the Year	Nominated
2009	Little Wildflower	Album of the Year	Nominated
2009	"What I Did Last Night"	Single of the Year	Nominated
2009	Catherine Britt – "What I Did Last Night"	Female Artist of the Year	Won
2009	"Little Wildflower" (directed by Myles Conti)	Video Clip of the Year	Nominated
2010	Catherine Britt	Album of the Year	Nominated
2011	"Sweet Emmylou"	Single of the Year	Won
2013	Always Never Enough	Album of the Year	Nominated
2013	Catherine Britt – "Charlestown Road"	Female Artist of the Year	Won
2013	"Charlestown Road" (directed by Jefferton James)	Video Clip of the Year	Nominated
2013	"Charlestown Road"	Heritage Song of the Year	Nominated
2013	"Always Never Enough"	Single of the Year	Nominated
2013	"Troubled Man" (Catherine Britt and Tim Rogers)	Vocal Collaboration of the Year	Nominated
2016	Boneshaker	Album of the Year	Nominated
2016	Catherine Britt – "Boneshaker"	Female Artist of the Year	Won
2016	"You And Me Against The World" (Catherine Britt and Steve Earle)	Vocal Collaboration of the Year	Nominated
2016	"Boneshaker"	APRA AMCOS Song of the Year	Nominated
2016	"Boneshaker"	Video Clip of the Year	Nominated
2016	"Boneshaker"	Single of the Year	Nominated
2017	(unknown)	(unknown)	Nominated
2019	"Fire & Ice" (with Andrew Swift)	Vocal Collaboration of the Year	Nominated
2019	Catherine Britt & The Cold Cold Hearts	Alternative Country Album of the Year	Nominated
2019	Catherine Britt & The Cold Cold Hearts	Group or Duo of the Year	Nominated
2024	The Beginning of the End (as The Pleasures)	Alt. Country Album of the Year	Pending
2024	The Pleasures (Catherine Britt and Lachlan Bryan)	Group or Duo of the Year	Nominated
2027	"A Little North of Sydney"	Heritage Song of the Year	Pending
2027	Catherine Britt	Female Artist of the Year	Pending
2027	The Hardest Thing	Contemporary Country Album of the Year	Pending
2027	The Hardest Thing	Album of the Year	Pending

=== CMC Country Music Channel Australia ===
Year	Category	For	Result
2009	CMC Oz Artist of the year	Herself	Nominated
2012	CMC Oz Artist of the year	Herself	Nominated

=== Vanda & Young Global Songwriting Competition ===
The Vanda & Young Global Songwriting Competition is an annual competition that "acknowledges great songwriting whilst supporting and raising money for Nordoff-Robbins" and is coordinated by Albert Music and APRA AMCOS. It commenced in 2009.

Year	Nominee / work	Award	Result
2011	"Sweet Emmylou"	Vanda & Young Global Songwriting Competition	2nd
