= Catherine Britt (album) =

Studio album by Catherine Britt
- Released: 28 May 2010
- Label: ABC Music / Universal Music Australia
- Producer: Shane Nicholson

Catherine Britt chronology
Little WildFlower (2008)	Catherine Britt (2010)	Always Never Enough (2012)

Catherine Britt is the fourth studio album by Australian country music singer Catherine Britt. The album was released in May 2010 and peaked at number 73 on the ARIA Charts.

At the ARIA Music Awards of 2010, the album was nominated for the ARIA Award for Best Country Album.

== Track listing ==
No.	Title	Length
1.	"I Want You Back"	2:47
2.	"Down"	2:49
3.	"Anywhere You Are"	2:20
4.	"Can't Change a Thing"	3:01
5.	"Sweet Emmylou"	3:07
6.	"More Than You Are"	2:47
7.	"Under My Thumb"	2:30
8.	"Call You Back Town"	3:19
9.	"Holy River"	2:52
10.	"Sleepy Town"	3:06
11.	"Since You Slipped Away"	3:32
12.	"Saved Me"	3:27
13.	"Lonely"	3:08
14.	"Where Do You Go?"	3:23

== Charts ==
=== Weekly charts ===
Chart (2010)	Peak position
Australian Albums Chart	73

=== Year-end charts ===
Chart (2010)	Rank
Australian Country Albums Chart	42

== Release history ==
Country	Date	Format	Label	Catalogue
Australia	28 May 2010	Digital download, CD	ABC Music / Universal Music Australia	2739484
