= Low Blows (album) =

Studio album by Meg Mac
- Released: 14 July 2017
- Studios: Niles City Sound, Fort Worth, Texas; Fitzroy, Victoria
- Genre: Indie pop
- Labels: littleBIGMAN, Universal Music Australia
- Producers: Austin Jenkins, Josh Block, Chris Vivion

Meg Mac chronology
| MegMac (2014) | Low Blows (2017) | Hope (2019) |

Singles from Low Blows
- 1. "Low Blows" Released: 31 March 2017; 2. "Maybe It's My First Time" Released: 2 June 2017; 3. "Don't Need Permission" Released: 29 June 2017

Low Blows is the debut studio album by Australian singer-songwriter, Meg Mac. The album was recorded in Texas in the US and Victoria, Australia. It was released on 14 July 2017.

Mac said she wanted to aim for a live sound: "A lot of the vocal performances are live and unedited. It is hard to leave mistakes on a record but I think it was important to do that."

At the J Awards of 2017, the album was nominated for Australian Album of the Year.

== Track listing ==
1. "Grace Gold" – 3:48
2. "Low Blows" – 3:32
3. "Kindness" – 3:23
4. "Cages" – 3:42
5. "Didn't Wanna Get So Low But I Had To" – 3:51
6. "Ride It" – 4:05
7. "Maybe It's My First Time" – 3:33
8. "Shiny Bright" – 3:20
9. "Brooklyn Apartment (It's Louder Than the TV and the Radio)" – 3:19
10. "Morning" – 1:39
11. "Every Lie" (acoustic live) – 3:25 (pre-order only)
12. "Never Be" (acoustic live) – 3:51 (pre-order only)
13. "Saint Philomene" (acoustic live) – 4:16 (pre-order only)

== Charts ==
| Chart (2017) | Peak position |
|---|---|
| Australian Albums (ARIA) | 2 |

== Release history ==
| Country | Date | Format | Label | Catalogue |
|---|---|---|---|---|
| Australia | 14 July 2017 | CD, digital download, vinyl | littleBIGMAN Records, Universal Music Australia | 5754966 |
