= MegMac =

EP by Meg Mac
- Released: 12 September 2014
- Recorded: 2013–14
- Genres: Indie pop; indie rock; synth-pop
- Label: 300 Entertainment

Meg Mac chronology
MegMac (2014)	Low Blows (2017)

Singles from MegMac
- 1. "Known Better" Released: 19 February 2013; 2. "Every Lie" Released: 15 November 2013; 3. "Roll Up Your Sleeves" Released: 1 June 2014

MegMac (also stylised as "MEGMAC") is the self-titled debut extended play (EP) by Australian indie pop artist Meg Mac. It was released on 12 September 2014. The EP contains four original songs and a cover of Bill Withers' “Grandma's Hands”.

The EP was nominated for Best Female Artist at the ARIA Music Awards of 2015 but lost to Sometimes I Sit and Think, and Sometimes I Just Sit by Courtney Barnett.

The EP was certified platinum in Australia in 2018.

== Background ==
“Music is definitely a way for me to get things out, otherwise, they sit in my head and stay there. Once these issues become songs, they are just songs for me to sing, it’s like they’re just songs, and they’re not real anymore. How I feel at the end is different than how I felt at the beginning. I don’t ever rush. It has to be real and come to me naturally because, at the end of the day, I can’t get on stage and sing something if I don’t believe in it.”

— Meg Mac on the MegMac EP

Interest for Meg Mac commenced in 2013 following the release of her debut single “Known Better”, which was played on Triple J. The second single called “Every Lie” was released on 13 November 2013 The song saw her win the Triple J Unearthed spot at Falls Festival in Lorne, as well as being named a 2014 Next Crop artist. The third single “Roll Up Your Sleeves” was released in July 2014 is a letter from Meg Mac to Meg Mac, and a literal reminder that everything really is going to be alright. The song gave Mac her first ARIA charting single, peaking at 80 in August 2015 The MegMac EP was announced in August 2014.

Much of the record comprises hooks and riffs she wrote as a teenager or while studying music at the Western Australian Academy of Performing Arts in Perth.

== Reception ==
Johnny Nail from Rolling Stone Australia described the EP as "a combination of Americana blues and dramatic pop" adding "she's clearly comfortable in her own communication; a definition that instantly makes her music vastly more engaging that the re-traced templates of over-exaggerated extravagance, twee delicacy and anthemic breakdowns pursued by her adversaries."

== Track listing ==
1. Roll Up Your Sleeves - (3:05)
2. Turning - (3:42)
3. Grandma's Hands - (4:03)
4. Every Lie - (3:13)
5. Known Better - (3:06)

== Certifications ==
Region	Certification	Certified units/sales
Australia (ARIA)	Platinum	70,000^{‡}
^{‡} Sales+streaming figures based on certification alone.

== Release history ==
Region	Date	Format(s)	Label	Catalogue
Australia	12 September 2014	Digital download, Compact Disc	littleBIGMANrecords / Inertia	BIG22
United States of America	7 April 2015	Digital download, Compact Disc	300 Entertainment	
