= Hope (Meg Mac album) =

Studio album by Meg Mac
- Released: 7 June 2019
- Length: 27:24
- Label: littleBIGMAN, EMI Music

Meg Mac chronology
Low Blows (2017)	Hope (2019)	Matter of Time (2022)

Singles from Hope
- 1. "Give Me My Name Back" Released: 12 October 2018; 2. "Something Tells Me" Released: 8 February 2019; 3. "I'm Not Coming Back" Released: 12 April 2019; 4. "Hope" Released: 7 June 2019

Hope is a mini-album by Australian singer-songwriter Meg Mac, released on 7 June 2019.

== Reception ==
Professional ratings
Review scores
Source	Rating
The AU Review	4/5 stars

Daniel Hanssen from The AU Review said "Hope is a record for Meg Mac to be proud of. It emphasises the heavier parts of life, whilst still paying homage to those lighter moments. These shade of light and dark are combined with such grace and clarity that it's hard not to be caught up in the experience... [it] shows why listeners have long been able to connect with Meg Mac's music."

Jeff Jenkins from JB Hi-Fi said "Meg Mac doesn’t exactly sound like Adele, but it's a valid comparison, because her voice is capable of soaring even when she's in pain" adding "[she] deserves to top the charts".

== Track listing ==
1. "Give Me My Name Back" – 3:11
2. "Something Tells Me" – 3:36
3. "Hope" – 4:35
4. "Head Away" – 3:56
5. "I'm Not Coming Back" – 3:06
6. "Want Me to Stay" – 3:29
7. "Before Trouble" – 5:31

== Charts ==
Chart (2019)	Peak position
Australian Albums (ARIA)	9

== Release history ==
Country	Date	Format	Label	Catalogue
Australia	7 June 2019	CD, digital download, LP, streaming	littleBIGMAN, EMI Music	LBM11 / LBM12
