= It's My Party (album) =

Studio album by Meg Mac
- Released: 20 February 2026
- Recorded: London and Los Angeles
- Length: 33:43
- Label: EMI
- Producer: Bullion

Meg Mac chronology
Matter of Time (2019)	It's My Party (2026)

Singles from It's My Party
- 1. "He Said No" Released: 18 July 2025; 2. "The Tune I'll Be Singing Until I'm Dead" Released: 12 September 2025; 3. "Sometimes" Released: 21 November 2025; 4. "Outdone" Released: 16 January 2026

It's My Party is the fourth studio by Australian singer-songwriter Meg Mac. The album was released on 20 February 2026, after being announced in July 2025 alongside the release of its lead single, "He Said No".

In January 2026, Mac said "I thought I had this whole album planned out – I was going for this dark, witchy vibe and I was so serious. Then honestly, not one thing went to plan and I was forced to let go for once in my life." Mac continued saying, "I've spent most of my career being stressed, but somehow I stopped trying to control it all and found the magic in collaboration, being open and not worrying so much."

The album was supported with the It's My Party Australian tour from February to April 2026.

At the 2026 ARIA Music Awards it was nominated for ARIA Award for Best Alternative Release.

== Reception ==
Professional ratings
Review scores
Source	Rating
The AU Review	4.5/5 stars

Pace Proctor from The AU Review said "Self-assured and sonically explorative, it's a mature offering that buries some big questions in pop-song velvet."

Dan Condon from Australian Broadcasting Corporation said "[Mac] delivers songs that are honest, brave, deeply relatable and pretty damn catchy."

== Track listing ==
It's My Party track listing
No.	Title	Music	Length
1.	"He Said No"	Megan McInerney; Noah Beresin; Julien Forsthe-Lewis; Nathan Jenkins	3:18
2.	"The Tune I'll Be Singing Until I'm Dead"	McInerney; Oliver Thorpe	3:05
3.	"I'm Gonna _ Somebody"	McInerey; Jenkins	3:26
4.	"Valentine"	McInerey; Jenkins	3:00
5.	"Outdone"	McInerney	3:55
6.	"Sometimes"	McInerney	3:39
7.	"Seventeen"	McInerey; Jenkins; PJ Harding	3:59
8.	"Now You Know"	McInerey; Jenkins; Forsythe-Lewis; Harding	3:00
9.	"What Have You Done"	McInerey; Johnny Took	3:25
10.	"It's My Party"	Walter Gold; John Gluck Jr.; Herb Weiner; Seymour Gottlieb	2:56
Total length:			33:43

== Charts ==
Chart performance for It's My Party
Chart (2026)	Peak position
Australian Albums (ARIA)	6
