= Matter of Time (Meg Mac album) =

Studio album by Meg Mac
- Released: 16 September 2022
- Length: 34:05
- Label: EMI
- Producers: The Donuts; Dylan Nash; Jesse Shatkin; Marius Andrei Feder; PJ Harding; Sam de Jong

Meg Mac chronology
Hope (2019)	Matter of Time (2022)	It's My Party (2026)

Singles from Matter of Time
- 1. "Is It Worth Being Sad" Released: 2 March 2022; 2. "On Your Mind" Released: 1 April 2022; 3. "Only Love" Released: 12 May 2022; 4. "Letter" Released: 8 July 2022; 5. "Understand" Released: 26 August 2022

Matter of Time is the third studio by Australian singer-songwriter Meg Mac, released on 16 September 2022 through EMI Music Australia.

The album was nominated for Australian Album of the Year at the 2022 J Awards.

At the 2023 ARIA Music Awards, the album earned Mac a nomination for Best Solo Artist.

== Background and release ==
Following the release of 2019 album Hope, Mac said she "took a risk and threw out an entire album and started again" after experiencing a "bit of a meltdown." She relocated to a small cottage in Burrawang, New South Wales, where she went off social media and went into my own little world, writing songs. The result is Matter of Time which features several songs co-written with PJ Harding, Jesse Shatkin and reimagined tunes that survived that scrapped album, including "Something in the Water", "Don't You Cry" and the title track. Upon the album's announcement, Mac said, "I wanted to just start again and do everything without compromise" adding that Matter of Time is "how I've always wanted to do an album. Knowing when it's not right, and having the confidence to say so and to take it in a different direction. Now for the first time, I really feel in control." Mac then announced the album on 6 July 2022.

== Track listing ==
All lyrics are written by Megan McInerney.

Matter of Time track listing
No.	Title	Music	Producer(s)	Length
1.	"Is It Worth Being Sad"	Megan McInerney; Marius Andrei Feder; PJ Harding; Sergiu Adrian Gherman; Tyler Reese Mehlenbacher	Feder; The Donuts	4:01
2.	"Only Love"	M. McInerney; Feder; Harding; Gherman; Mehlenbacher	The Donuts	3:05
3.	"Understand"	M. McInerney; Jesse Shatkin	Shatkin	2:57
4.	"Something in the Water"	M. McInerney; Hannah McInerney; Peter Gonzales; Gherman; Mehlenbacher	The Donuts	3:27
5.	"Letter"	M. McInerney	Dylan Nash	3:09
6.	"On Your Mind"	M. McInerney; Feder; Gherman; Mehlenbacher; Daniel Nathan Krieger	The Donuts	3:56
7.	"Matter of Time"	M. McInerney; Sam de Jong	De Jong; The Donuts	3:58
8.	"Don't You Cry"	M. McInerney; Harding	Harding	4:02
9.	"Lifesaver"	M. McInerney; Harding	The Donuts	2:36
10.	"Head on the Pillow"	M. McInerney; Harding	Nash	2:54
Total length:				34:09

== Charts ==
Chart performance for Matter of Time
Chart (2022)	Peak position
Australian Albums (ARIA)	1

== Release history ==
Release history and formats for Matter of Time
Region	Date	Format	Catalogue	Label	Ref.
Various	16 September 2022	Digital download; streaming	—N/a	EMI Music Australia	
Australia	16 September 2022	LP	4579860	EMI Music Australia	
Australia	16 September 2022	CD	4579861	EMI Music Australia	
