= Roll Up Your Sleeves (song) =

Single by Meg Mac

from the album MegMac (EP)
- Released: 1 July 2014
- Length: 3:05
- Label: littleBIGMAN, Inertia
- Songwriter: Megan Sullivan McInerney (Meg Mac)

Meg Mac singles chronology
"Every Lie" (2013)	"Roll Up Your Sleeves" (2014)	"Never Be" (2015)

Music video
- "Roll Up Your Sleeves" on YouTube

"Roll Up Your Sleeves" is a song recorded by Australian singer Meg Mac for her extended play, MegMac. The song was released for digital download on 1 July 2014. "Roll Up Your Sleeves" gave Mac her first ARIA Charts entry, peaking at number 80. The song was voted in at number 24 on the Triple J Hottest 100, 2014.

In an interview with Rolling Stone Australia, Mac described the song saying; “I feel like I wrote this song from myself to myself as some sort of reminder. Doing the right thing is hard and sometimes it is way easier to pretend you don't give a shit. Deep down I think we all give a shit and that everything has to be alright if you want it to be. I do really believe that.”

Meg also said it is the quickest song she has ever written.

The song placed second in the 2014 Vanda & Young Global Songwriting Competition.

== Reviews ==
The track has been described as “a dark soul ballad enriched by a warm, breathy refrain, the piano-led single stands in radiant contrast to the grit of powerhouse stomper, “Every Lie””

In a review on Triple J, it was described as “punchy and empowering".

Nastassia Baroni of Music Feeds said; “This new single follows up tracks "Known Better" and "Every Lie" and it's laced with as much bluesy soul as its predecessors. Led by a simple driving piano, [Mac's] powerful and soaring vocals demand all the attention.”

Zara Golden from The Fader described the song as “a folky, infectious just-do-you anthem.”

== Music video ==
The black and white music video for “Roll Up Your Sleeves” was directed by Tobias Andersson and released on 14 July 2014.

== Charts ==
Weekly chart performance for "Roll Up Your Sleeves "
Chart (2014)	Peak position
Australia (ARIA)	80
Australian Independent Chart (AIR)	3

== Certifications ==
Certifications for "Roll Up Your Sleeves"
Region	Certification	Certified units/sales
Australia (ARIA)	Platinum	70,000^{‡}
^{‡} Sales+streaming figures based on certification alone.

== Covers ==
Urthboy (featuring Hermitude, All Our Exes Live in Texas, Tom Thum and Kira Puru) covered the song in December 2015 as part of Triple J’s ‘Like a Version’.
