= Lost Highway Records Australia =

Australian record label; imprint of Universal Music Australia Pty. Ltd.

- Parent company: Universal Music Group
- Founded: 2014
- Founder: Michael Taylor
- Distributor(s): Universal Music Australia
- Genre: Country & Roots
- Country of origin: Australia
- Location: Sydney, Australia
- Official website: http://www.losthighwayaustralia.com/

Lost Highway Australia was launched in 2014 by Universal Music Australia as the Australian arm of the original Lost Highway Records, owned by Universal Music Group. Lost Highway Records was the home of Ryan Adams, Lucinda Williams, The Jayhawks, Whiskeytown, Lyle Lovett, Shelby Lynne, the soundtrack of O Brother, Where Art Thou?, Willie Nelson, Ryan Bingham, Johnny Cash and others. In 2005, Powderfinger’s Bernard Fanning became the first Australian to sign to Lost Highway in the USA.

Lost Highway Australia will sign country and roots-based music in Australia, New Zealand, and the Pacific region starting in 2014, with the announcement of its first release by Australian singer/songwriter Catherine Britt, who has worked with artists such as Paul Kelly, Elton John, Tim Rogers, Shane Nicholson, Kasey Chambers and Kenny Chesney. In the USA, Catherine has charted several singles on the Billboard Hot Country Songs chart, she has also been the recipient of Country Music Awards of Australia Golden Guitars Awards, and ARIA and APRA nominations in Australia. In 2014, Britt will release her 6th studio album on Lost Highway Records Australia, which she is writing and recording.

== See also ==
- List of record labels
