= Too Far Gone (Catherine Britt album) =

Studio album by Catherine Britt
- Released: 16 January 2006
- Recorded: 2004–2005
- Studio: The Castle Recording Studios, Franklin, TN; The Sound Station and Wedgewood Sound, Nashville, TN
- Genre: Country
- Length: 39:10
- Label: ABC Country/Warner
- Producer: Bill Chambers; Keith Stegall

Catherine Britt chronology
Dusty Smiles and Heartbreak Cures (2001)	Too Far Gone (2006)	Little WildFlower (2008)

Singles from Too Far Gone
- 1. "The Upside of Being Down" Released: 22 August 2004; 2. "Poor Man's Pride" Released: 2005; 3. "Swingin' Door" Released: 2006; 4. "Too Far Gone" Released: 2006

Too Far Gone is the second studio album from Australian country music artist Catherine Britt, released on 16 January 2006. It peaked in the top 50 of the ARIA Albums Charts and No. 3 on the ARIA Country Albums Chart. It was co-produced by Bill Chambers and Keith Stegall. At the ARIA Music Awards of 2006 Britt received a nomination for Best Country Album for Too Far Gone.

"The Upside of Being Down" was released as a single in the United States in August 2004, where it was promoted by RCA Records. It reached the top 60 on the US Billboard Hot Country Songs chart. Australian singles released from the album were "Poor Man's Pride" (2005), "Swingin' Door" (2006) and the title track (2006). Two cover versions are included on the album, "Wrapped" by Bruce Robison as the title track of his 1998 album, and "Life's Highway" by Steve Wariner from his 1986 album of the same name.

== Reception ==
Jeff Glorfeld of The Age observed, "it becomes evident she is serious about her music, showing classical influences such as Hank Williams and Loretta Lynn... The voice is rich if generic, and the songs are mostly from the honkytonk heartache, you-done-me-wrong perspective, which sounds a bit silly coming from this kid, but Britt's wry self-awareness makes it work. It's good fun."

Comcast's Tim Noel felt "[it] may not be strong enough to share with your friends as far as an introduction to [Britt]. There is some strong material here such as 'Swingin' Door' and 'Poor Man's Pride', but it's filled with mediocre stuff that sounds like late 90s material... I know Britt has a more rocking side that should hopefully come out in her upcoming [album]." Amazon.com editorial review includes, "an exquisitely crafted collection of powerful and moving songs, mostly written by Catherine."

== Track listing ==
Too Far Gone ABC Music/Warner Music Australia (5101113472)
No.	Title	Writer(s)	Length
1.	"Swingin' Door"	Terry Clayton, Brett James, Ashley Monroe	3:45
2.	"Wrapped"	Bruce Robison	3:38
3.	"Too Far Gone"	Catherine Britt, Paul Overstreet	3:48
4.	"The Upside of Being Down"	Christi Baker, Shari Baker, Rory Lee Feek	3:06
5.	"New Pair of Shoes"	Dean Dillon, Jim McBride	3:47
6.	"Hot Doggin'"	Britt, Jerry Salley	2:29
7.	"Fallin' Out of Love with You"	Britt, Brice Long	3:31
8.	"I'm Gone"	Britt, Keith Stegall, Dan Hill	3:01
9.	"I'm Nobody's Fool"	Britt, Long	4:10
10.	"Life's Highway"	Richard Leigh, Roger Murrah	3:37
11.	"Poor Man's Pride"	Britt, Salley, Guy Clark	4:18
Total length:			39:10

== Charts ==
Chart (2008)	Peak position
ARIA Albums Chart	47
ARIA Australasian Artists Albums Chart	14
ARIA Country Albums Chart	3
