= Boneshaker (Catherine Britt album) =

Studio album by Catherine Britt
- Released: 1 May 2015
- Recorded: Seattle, USA
- Length: 35:47
- Label: Lost Highway Records / Universal Music Australia
- Producer: Ryan Hadlock

Catherine Britt chronology
The Hillbilly Pickin' Ramblin' Girl So Far... (2013)	Boneshaker (2015)	Catherine Britt & the Cold Cold Hearts (2018)

Boneshaker is the sixth studio album by Australian country music singer Catherine Britt. The album was released on 1 May 2015 and peaked at number 41 on the ARIA Charts.

On the advice of her longtime producer Bill Chambers, Britt sought to work for the first time with a new producer and worked with Ryan Hadlock. Britt said Hadlock's production style was very different to Chambers' and "[it] took some getting used to" saying "Ryan comes from a different background. Bill, at the end of the day is a total hillbilly, which I love. Ryan comes from a more folk-rock, pop background and had these ideas that I would never think of. He did things in a way I never knew you could do things... he was so different and it was something I had to get used to."

Britt toured the album across Australian from May to October 2015.

== Reception ==
Chris Hamilton from No Depression gave the album 7 out of 10 saying "Drawing on a range of country styles from Americana to traditional, pop to rock, Catherine Britt has produced a strong collection of songs on her sixth album." adding "Vocally she can sound sweet and twangy like a younger Dolly Parton or rougher-edged like her contemporary Kasey Chambers. That range is what gives Boneshaker its personality and ensures it stands head and shoulders above much of the soulless country music purporting to represent the genre"

== Track listing ==
No.	Title	Writer(s)	Length
1.	"Boneshaker"	Catherine Britt; Tony Buchen	2:59
2.	"Good to Bad"	Britt	3:13
3.	"Happier Day"	Britt; Felicity Urquhart	2:50
4.	"Nice Girl"	Britt	3:22
5.	"Take It Easy"	Britt	3:16
6.	"When You're Ready"	Britt; Melanie Horsnell	2:18
7.	"We're All Waiting"	Britt	3:54
8.	"That Way That It Goes"	Britt	3:45
9.	"Working Class Man"	Britt	3:20
10.	"Let Your Hair Down"	Britt	3:01
11.	"You and Me Against the Wind" (featuring Steve Earle)	Britt	3:44

== Charts ==
=== Weekly charts ===
Chart (2015)	Peak position
Australian Albums (ARIA)	41

=== Year-end charts ===
Chart (2015)	Rank
Australian Country Albums Chart	80

== Release history ==
Country	Date	Format	Label	Catalogue
Australia	1 May 2015	Digital download, CD	Lost Highway Records / Universal Music Australia	00602547189882
