= Never Be =

Single by Meg Mac
- Released: 7 August 2015
- Length: 4:13
- Label: littleBIGMAN, Inertia
- Songwriter: Megan McInerney

Meg Mac singles chronology
"Roll Up Your Sleeves" (2014)	"Never Be" (2015)	"Low Blows" (2017)

Music video
- "Never Be" on YouTube

"Never Be" is a song by Australian singer Meg Mac, released for digital download on 7 August 2015. "Never Be" gave Mac her first ARIA Chart top 50 entry, peaking at number 39. The song was voted in at number 11 on the Triple J Hottest 100, 2015.

At the ARIA Music Awards of 2015 "Never Be" was nominated for Breakthrough Artist, but lost to Sometimes I Sit and Think, and Sometimes I Just Sit by Courtney Barnett.

In an interview with News Corp Mac explained "Never Be" cautions against the 'grass is greener' envy of other people’s lives. She said "“I noticed people think my life is super cool; it’s crazy to hear what people think the reality is of what I do. The most popular misconception is probably that touring in America is glamorous when it’s counting your pimples while sitting in a van for hours.”

In an interview with Guardian Australia Mac’s described the song’s chorus was written while in her car 'tapping the steering wheel and singing over the top'. Mac explained she was forced to keep singing what she’d composed in her head, over and over until she reached home as her phone battery was dead. “That is maybe where the repetition came from,” she says. “And that’s my favourite thing about the song, how it feels like a chant you can tell yourself over and over.”

== Reviews ==
Mike Wass of Idolator said; "Never Be" is a "bold and beautiful experiment"

In a review on Triple J, it was described as “a searing track" featuring “dark-shaded soul, gospel flair, [and] a smouldering vocal performance.

Tom Williams of Music Feeds said; “The track sees Mac’s soulful vocals team up with piano-backed gospel tones and some powerful backing vocals from her little sister, Hannah Mac”

== Music video ==
The music video for "Never Be" was directed by Tobias Andersson and released on 15 September 2015.

== Charts ==
Weekly chart performance for "Never Be"
Chart (2015)	Peak position
Australia (ARIA)	39
