= Niles City Sound =

Recording studio in Fort Worth, Texas

Niles City Sound is a music studio in Fort Worth, Texas, United States.

The studio was established in 2014 by Austin Jenkins, Josh Block, and Chris Vivion. Jenkins and Block were both members of the band White Denim. The three founders had been accumulating equipment for some time to create a studio, when they met soul singer Leon Bridges, then working as a dish washer. After seeing Bridges perform, Jenkins, Block and Vivion used the studio to record Bridge's debut album Coming Home. Niles City Sound was credited with producing, mixing and co-writing the album, which Columbia Records released. The album was recorded using only vintage machines The studio prefers to use analog equipment, some of which dates between 1948 and 1962, and includes multitrack tape recorders. They believe this approach creates a human sound. Vogue wrote this of the recording process: "They cut the tracks live, start to finish, for the most part no overdubs, with dozens of people dropping by to play along or simply sit in." Paste Magazine has credited the studio's production with having a "classic, lo-fi feel" Nicole Atkins recorded at the studio in 2016.
