= Meg Mac =

Australian musical artist

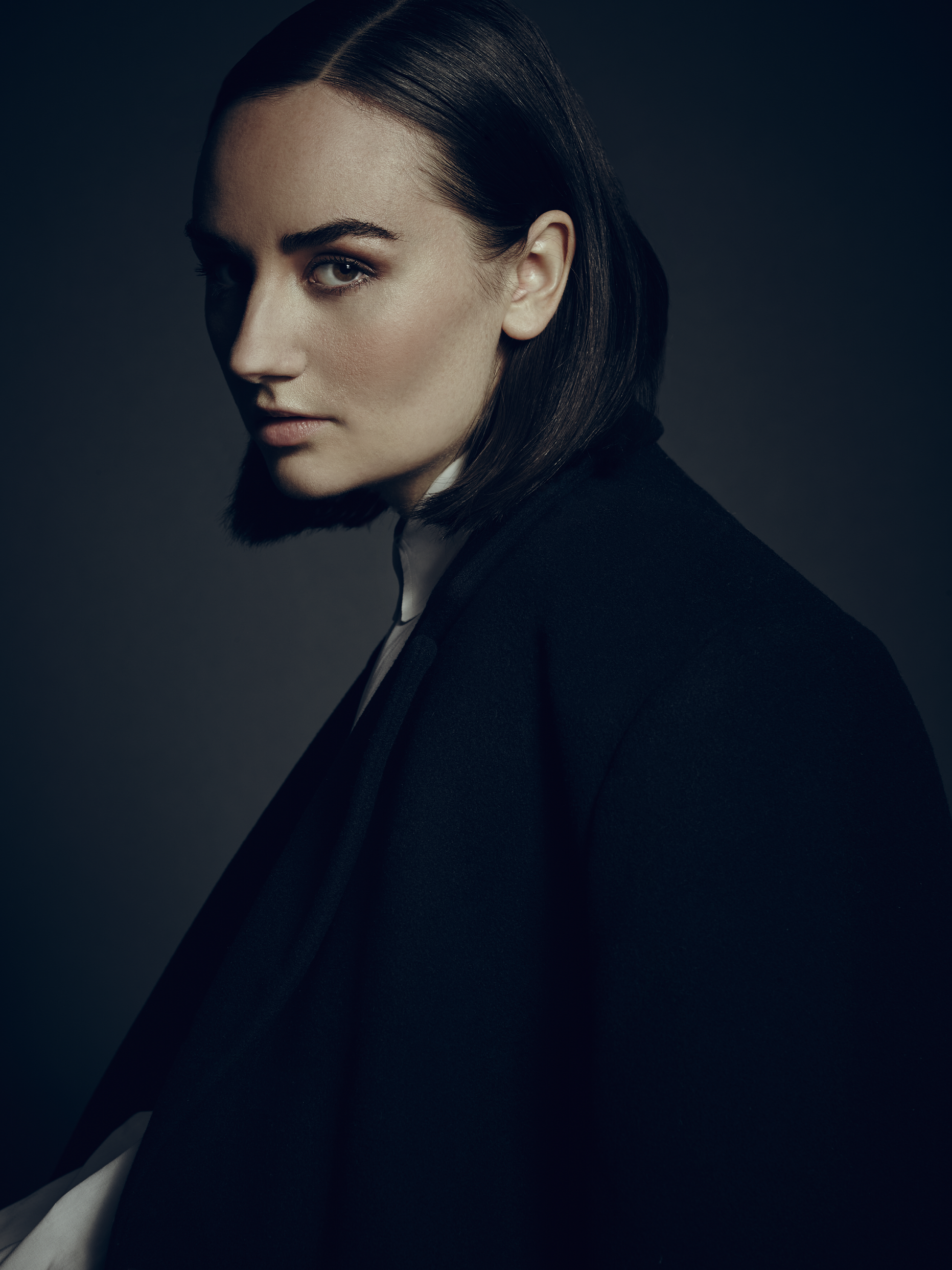

Background information
- Born: Megan McInerney; 1990 (age 35–36); Sydney, New South Wales, Australia
- Genres: Alternative R&B; blue-eyed soul; pop; indie rock; blues rock
- Occupation: Musician
- Instruments: Vocals, keyboards
- Years active: 2013–present
- Labels: littleBIGMAN/Inertia, 300 Entertainment, EMI Music Australia
- Website: megmac.com.au

Megan McInerney (born 1989 or 1990), known by her stage name Meg Mac, is an Australian singer-songwriter and musician. She signed to littleBIGMAN Records in 2014, locally, and 300 Entertainment in the United States.

== Early life and education ==
Megan McInerney was born in Sydney, New South Wales, in 1989 or 1990. Her father, Gary, was a pilot, while her mother Gladys worked in the clothing industry. Megan is the middle child of five (three sisters and one brother).

She went to school at The McDonald College in Sydney.

She began a degree in digital media but soon quit this after she moved to Perth, Western Australia, to study music at the Western Australian Academy of Performing Arts. After completing her degree, she recorded "Known Better" and submitted it to Triple J Unearthed. After deciding to move to Melbourne, Victoria, she headed east on a road trip with a carload of friends. As they were approaching Melbourne, she discovered that Triple J, a national radio station, was planning to play her song that evening.

== Musical career ==
=== 2013–2017: Career beginnings and Low Blows ===
The initial exposure to Triple J catapulted Mac's musical career. She was the Unearthed Featured Artist of the Week in 2013 and Unearthed Artist of the Year in 2014.

In July 2014, Mac announced her first national headline tour to promote her debut extended play, MegMac, which was issued on 12 September that year on littleBIGMAN Records. On Triple J, the national youth radio station, she was announced as their "Unearthed Artist of 2014", while Marie Claire Australia chose her as an "Artist to Watch" for 2015 and she received a nomination for Rolling Stone Australia's "Best New Talent" Award.

She was reviewed by The New York Times, BuzzFeed, and Daytrotter. Mac toured supporting Clean Bandit.

On 15 August 2015, Mac achieved her first top 50 chart appearance with "Never Be", which entered the ARIA Singles Chart at No. 39. It out-peaked her first top 100 single, "Roll Up Your Sleeves", which had reached No. 80 in August 2014. At the ARIA Music Awards of 2015 she was nominated for Best Female Artist for MEGMAC and Breakthrough Artist for "Never Be". On 26 January 2016, "Never Be" made it to No.11 on the Triple J Hottest 100.

Mac's debut album Low Blows was released on 14 July 2017, and entered the ARIA Chart at No.2

=== 2018–2021: Hope ===
In October 2018, Mac released the single "Give Me My Name Back" which she told Billboard "is a song for those who have suffered emotional and physical abuse; it's for the women who are standing up and speaking out, those discriminated against in the LGBTQI community, the indigenous people of Australia and the children abused by the church. For everyone who has lost an important part of themselves and needs to reclaim their identity, dignity, and self-worth to move forward with their lives." Her second studio album was announced on 12 April 2019 under the title Hope.

In 2018, Mac collaborated with Dan Sultan on Killer Under a Blood Moon, produced and recorded by Jan Skubiszewski. The album was nominated for two ARIA awards and debuted at number 5 on the ARIA Albums Chart.

=== 2022–2024: Matter of Time ===
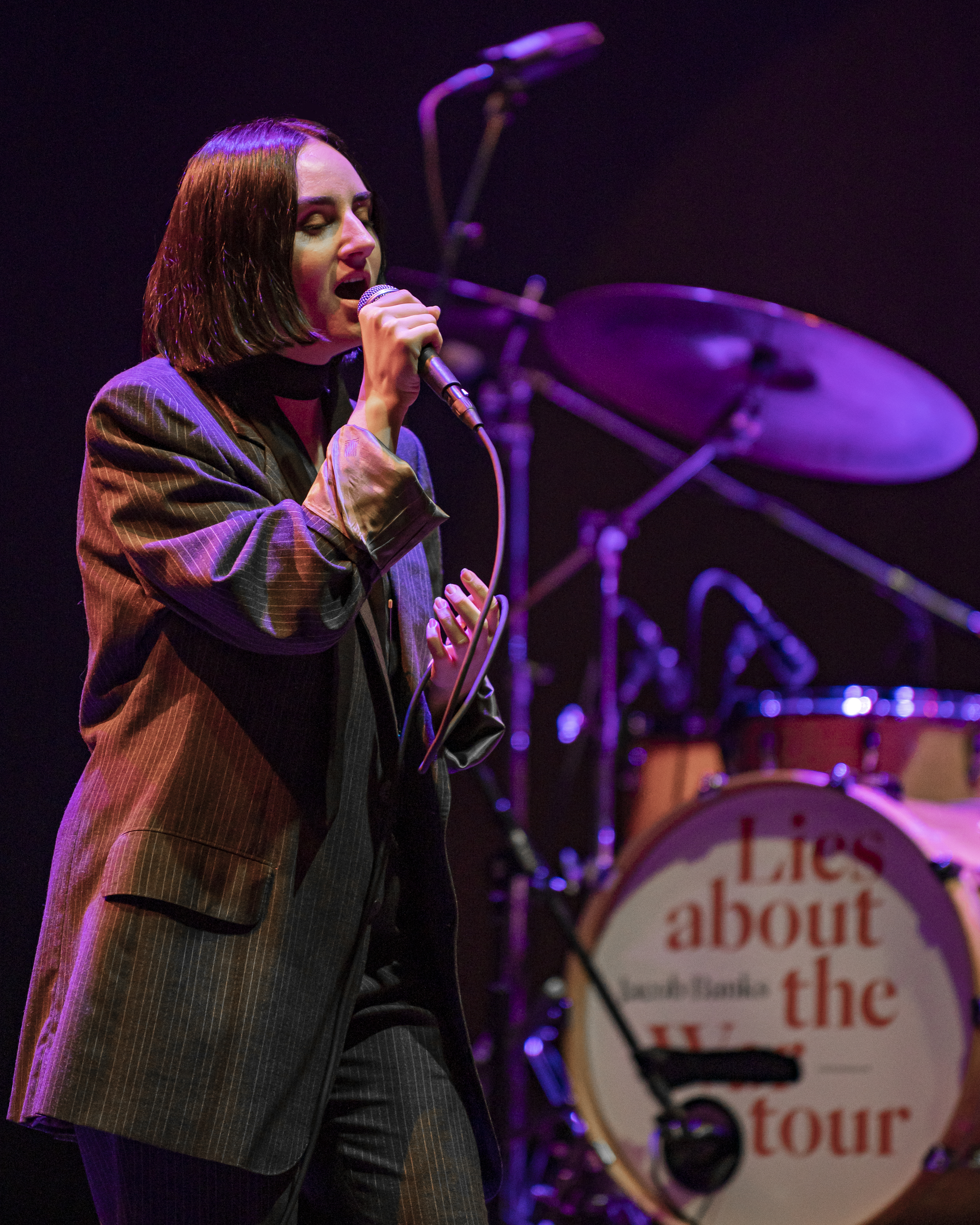
Meg Mac performing in August 2022

In March 2022, Mac released "Is It Worth Being Sad", with Mac saying: "I was running away from my troubles. I was living in peace finally and thought I'd figured it all out, and it was all smooth sailing ahead. It was the start of sorting out my life. This song was like my first step—I didn't know it then, though." This was followed by "On My Mind" on 30 March 2022 and an Australian tour announcement, commencing in May. In July 2022, Mac announced her third studio album Matter of Time, which was released on 16 September 2022. The album was proceeded by the singles "Is It Worth Being Sad", "On Your Mind", "Only Love", "Letter" and "Understand". The album debuted at number 1 on the ARIA Charts.

On 29 November 2022, Mac released a five-track live EP titled Live At Golden Retriever.

On Saturday 16 November 2024, she performed at the After Race Concert of the Adelaide 500 motor racing event in Adelaide, South Australia, alongside Crowded House and local hip hop artist J-MILLA.

=== 2025: It's My Party ===
In July 2025, Mac released "He Said No", the lead single for her fourth studio album, It's My Party.

== Discography ==
- Low Blows (2017)
- Hope (2019)
- Matter of Time (2022)
- It's My Party (2026)

== Tours ==
- Headlining Australian Tour (2014)
- Low Blows Australian Tour (2017)
- Give Me My Name Back Tour (2018–2019)
- On My Mind Tour (2022)
- It's My Party Tour (2026)

== Awards and nominations ==
=== AIR Awards ===
The Australian Independent Record Awards (commonly known informally as AIR Awards) is an annual awards night to recognise, promote and celebrate the success of Australia's Independent Music sector.

Year	Nominee / work	Award	Result
2014	herself	Breakthrough Independent Artist	Nominated

=== ARIA Music Awards ===
The ARIA Music Awards is an annual award ceremony event celebrating the Australian music industry.

Year	Nominee / work	Award	Result	Ref.
2023	Matter of Time	Best Solo Artist	Nominated	
2026	It's My Party	ARIA Award for Best Alternative Release	Nominated	

=== J Awards ===
The J Awards is an annual series of Australian music awards that were established by the Australian Broadcasting Corporation's youth-focused radio station Triple J. They commenced in 2005.

Year	Nominee / work	Award	Result	Ref.
2014	herself	Unearthed Artist of the Year	Won	
2017	Low Blows	Australian Album of the Year	Nominated	
2022	Matter of Time	Australian Album of the Year	Nominated	

=== MTV Europe Music Awards ===
The MTV Europe Music Awards is an award presented by Viacom International Media Networks to honour artists and music in pop culture.

Year	Nominee / work	Award	Result
2017	herself	Best Australian Act	Nominated

=== Music Victoria Awards ===
The Music Victoria Awards is an annual awards night celebrating Victorian music. They commenced in 2006.

Year	Nominee / work	Award	Result	Ref.
2017	Meg Mac	Best Female Artist	Nominated	

=== National Live Music Awards ===
The National Live Music Awards (NLMAs) is a broad recognition of Australia's diverse live industry, celebrating the success of the Australian live scene. The awards commenced in 2016.

Year	Nominee / work	Award	Result
2016	herself	International Live Achievement (Solo)	Nominated
2017	herself	Live Voice of the Year	Nominated
2019	herself	International Live Achievement (Solo)	Nominated

=== Vanda & Young Global Songwriting Competition ===
The Vanda & Young Global Songwriting Competition is an annual competition that "acknowledges great songwriting whilst supporting and raising money for Nordoff-Robbins" and is coordinated by Albert Music and APRA AMCOS. It commenced in 2009.

Year	Nominee / work	Award	Result
2014	"Roll Up Your Sleeves"	Vanda & Young Global Songwriting Competition	2nd
