= Slim Dusty discography =

The discography of Slim Dusty (1927–2003) (AO, MBE), an Australian country music singer, consists of 128 records, 61 studio albums.

By March 1976, Dusty had achieved 37 gold and two platinum records. By November 1979, this Dusty had amassed 63 gold and platinum albums.

In 2018, it was reported Dusty had sold more than seven million records and earned over 70 gold and platinum album certifications.

Dusty had number singles with "A Pub with No Beer" (1958) and "Duncan" (1980). In 2000 his 100th album Looking Forward Looking Back won the ARIA Award for Best Country Album

NB: Chart positions prior to 1970 are unknown. Certifications prior to 1990 are unknown.

== Albums ==
=== Studio albums ===
Title	Album details	Chart positions	Certifications (sales thresholds)
Title	Album details	AUS	Certifications (sales thresholds)
Slim Dusty Sings	Released: 1960; Label: EMI Music/Columbia (330SX-7611)	—	
Songs for Rolling Stones (credited to Slim Dusty And His Bushlanders)	Released: 1961; Label: EMI/Columbia (33OSX-7642)	—	
Along the Road of Song	Released: 1962; Label: EMI/Columbia (33OSX-7654)	—	
Aussie Sing Song (credited to Slim Dusty And His Bushlanders)	Released: 1962; Label: EMI/Columbia (33OSX-7668); AKA Slim Dusty Sing Song	—	
Another Aussie Sing Song (credited to Slim Dusty And His Bushlanders)	Released: 1963; Label: EMI/Columbia (33OSX-7689)	—	
Songs in the Saddle	Released: 1963; Label: EMI/Columbia (33OSX-7697)	—	
Songs of Australia	Released: 1964; Label: EMI/Columbia (33OSX-7713)	—	
People and Places (credited to Slim Dusty And His Bushlanders)	Released: 1964; Label: EMI/Columbia	—	
Australian Bush Ballads	Released: 1965; Label: EMI/Columbia (33OSX-7745)	—	
The Nature of Man	Released: 1966; Label: EMI/Columbia	—	
An Evening with Slim and Joy (with Joy McKean)	Released: 1966; Label: EMI/Columbia (33OSX-7761)	—	
Essentially Australian	Released: 1967; Label: EMI/Columbia (33OSX-7790)	—	ARIA: Gold
Songs My Father Sang to Me	Released: 1967; Label: EMI/Columbia (33OSX-7814)	—	
Songs from the Cattle Camps	Released: 1968; Label: EMI/Columbia (33OSX-7846)	—	
Sing Along with Dad (with Joy McKean, Anne and David)	Released: 1968; Label: EMI/Columbia	—	
Cattle Camp Crooner	Released: 1969; Label: EMI/Columbia (33OSX-7902)	—	
Sing a Happy Song	Released: 1970; Label: EMI/Columbia	—	
Songs from the Land I Love	Released: 1971; Label: EMI/Columbia (SCX-7987)	—	
Glory Bound Train	Released: 1971; Label: EMI/Columbia (SCX-7993)	—	
Me and My Guitar	Released: 1972; Label: EMI/Columbia (SCX-7999)	—	
Foolin' Around (with Joy McKean)	Released: 1973; Label: EMI/Columbia	—	
Tall Stories and Sad Songs	Released: 1973; Label: EMI/Columbia (SCX-8016)	—	
Australiana	Released: August 1974; Label: EMI/Columbia (SCX-8018)	96	
Lights on the Hill	Released: August 1975; Label: EMI/Columbia (SCX-8028)	45	ARIA: 5× Gold
Things I See Around Me (featuring The Travelling Country Band)	Released: June 1976; Label: EMI/Columbia (SCX-8030)	62	
Give Me the Road (featuring The Travelling Country Band)	Released: October 1976; Label: EMI/Columbia (SCX-8032)	81	
Just Slim With Old Friends (with Barry Thornton, Paul and Colleen Trenwith and Linsday Butler)	Released: 1977; Label: EMI/Columbia (SCX-8034)	—	
On the Move (with The new Travelling Country Band)	Released: September 1977; Label: EMI/Columbia (SCX-8035)	59	
To Whom it May Concern	Released: August 1978; Label: EMI/Columbia (SCX-8037)	64	
Spirit of Australia	Released: May 1979; Label: EMI/Columbia (SCX-8038)	79	
Walk a Country Mile	Released: October 1979; Label: EMI/Columbia (SCX-8039)	58	ARIA: Gold
The Man Who Steadies the Lead	Released: August 1980; Label: EMI/Columbia (SCX-8040)	61	
The Slim Dusty Family Album	Released: December 1980; Label: EMI/Columbia (SCX-8041)	65	
Where Country Is	Released: September 1981; Label: EMI/Columbia (SCX-8042)	59	
Who's Riding Old Harlequin Now? (with The Travelling Country Band)	Released: October 1982; Label: EMI/Columbia (SCX-8044)	90	
On the Wallaby	Released: July 1983; Label: EMI/Columbia (SCX-8045)	76	
Trucks on the Track	Released: May 1984; Label: EMI/Columbia (SCXO-430002)	50	ARIA: Gold
Singer from Down Under	Released: July 1985; Label: EMI/Columbia (EMC 263)	78	
To a Mate (Slim Dusty Remembers "Mack" Cormack)	Released: 1985; Label: EMI/Columbia (TC-FA.157016)	—	
Stories I Wanted to Tell	Released: 1986; Label: EMI/Columbia (SCXO-430037)	—	
Beer Drinking Songs of Australia	Released: November 1986; Label: EMI/Columbia (SCXO-430045)	77	
Neon City	Released: September 1987; Label: EMI/Columbia (SCXO-430058)	86	
Cattlemen from the High Plains	Released: February 1988; Label: CEMI/Columbia (SCXO-748656)	95	
G'day, G'day	Released: 12 December 1988; Label: EMI/Columbia (SCXO-791447)	55	ARIA: Gold
King of Kalgoorlie	Released: July 1989; Label: EMI/Columbia (SCXO-792455)	79	
Two Singers One Song (with Anne Kirkpatrick)	Released: 16 October 1989; Label: Columbia (SCXO-793190)	134	
Coming Home	Released: October 1990; Label: Columbia (SCXO-795282)	98	
That's The Song We're Singing	Released: 9 November 1992; Label: Columbia	123	
Ringer from the Top End	Released: 4 October 1993; Label: EMI (8271942)	65	
Natural High	Released: 10 October 1994; Label: EMI (8303472)	95	
Country Way of Life	Released: 28 August 1995; Label: EMI (8145722)	71	
A Time to Remember	Released: 14 April 1997; Label: EMI (724385673221)	18	
Makin' a Mile	Released: 31 October 1997; Label: EMI (724382330424)	34	ARIA: Gold
West of Winton	Released: 1999 (Later withdrawn); Reissued: 15 October 2001; Label: EMI (4957392)	197	
Ninety Nine	Released: 25 October 1999; Label: EMI (5234884)	50	
Looking Forward Looking Back	Released: 17 July 2000; Label: EMI (5271604)	3	ARIA: 2× Platinum
The Men From Nulla Nulla (credited to Slim Dusty and Shorty Ranger)	Released: 15 October 2001; Label: EMI (5362432)	—	
Travellin' Still...Always Will (with Anne Kirkpatrick)	Released: 18 March 2002; Label: EMI (724353803421)	37	ARIA: Gold
Columbia Lane – the Last Sessions	Released: 1 March 2004; Label: EMI (724357729024)	5	ARIA: Gold; ARIA: Gold (with 91 Over 50)
"—" denotes a recording that did not chart, position unknown or was not released in that territory.

=== Soundtrack albums ===
Title	Album details	Chart positions
Title	Album details	AUS
The Slim Dusty Movie	Released: August 1984; Label: EMI Music (VMP.430004/2)	73
I've Been There and Back Again (The Soundtrack to the Joy McKean Book)	Released: October 2011; Label: EMI; Tracks recorded between 1940 and 2001	161
Slim and I (Slim Dusty & Various Artists)	Released: 4 September 2020; Label: EMI (0748837)	8

=== Live albums ===
Title	Album details	Chart positions	Certifications
Title	Album details	AUS	Certifications
Live at Wagga Wagga	Released: 1972; Label: Axis (AXIS 6017)	—	ARIA: Gold
Live at Tamworth	Released: 1973; Label: Columbia/EMI (TVSS-12)	—	
The Entertainer (Live at the Sydney Opera House)	Released: 1978; Label: Columbia/EMI (VMP-1062)	—	
Live Across Australia (credited to The Slim Dusty Family)	Released: 1986; Label: Axis (AX.701234); Recorded in 1983	—	
Live into the '90s	Released: 4 May 1992; Label: EMI (7990252); Recorded in 1991	92	
The Slim Dusty Show (Live in Townsville 1956)	Released: 22 January 1996; Label: EMI (8324072); Recorded in 1956	—	
91 Over 50	Released: 26 August 1996; Label: EMI (8147122); Recorded in 1996	46	ARIA: Gold (with Columbia Lane – the Last Sessions)
Slim Dusty Live	Released: 11 March 2006; Label: EMI Music (3524912); Recorded in 2000	42	
Live at Tamworth 1996 (credited The Slim Dusty Travelling Country Band Reunion Show)	Released: 12 January 2025; Label: ACRA (Desk Tape Series)	—	
Live at Tamworth 1996 (credited to The Slim Dusty Family Show)	Released: 12 January 2025; Label: ACRA (Desk Tape Series)	—	
"—" denotes a recording that did not chart, position unknown or was not released in that territory.

=== Compilation albums ===
Title	Album details	Chart positions	Certifications (sales thresholds)
Title	Album details	AUS	Certifications (sales thresholds)
Encores	Released: 1969; Label: Columbia (330SX-9565)	—	
The Best of Slim Dusty	Released: 1973; Label: World Record Club (S-5359)	—	
Dusty Tracks	Released: 1973; Label: Axis (AXIS 6083); Tracks recorded between 1959 and 1967	—	
Dinki-Di Aussies	Released: 1974; Label: Axis (TC-AX-1095); Tracks recorded between 1957 and 1969	—	
The Best of Slim Dusty Volume 2	Released: 1975; Label: Columbia (SCX-8021)	—	
Way Out There	Released: 1975; Label: Axis; Tracks recorded between 1957 and 1964	—	
This Is Your Life	Released: 1976; Label: EMI (SCXA 8033)	—	
Songs from Down Under	Released: 1976; Label: Axis (TC-AX- 10306); Tracks recorded between 1959 and 1972	—	
Slim Dusty Sings His Favourite Songs	Released: 1976; Label: World Record Club (R-60533)	—	
Travelling Country Man	Released: 1977; Label: Axis (TC-AX- 10334); Tracks recorded between 1959 and 1973	—	
A Guitar and a Hat	Released: February 1979; Label: World Record Club (90544, C 90545, C 90546); 3× vinyl box set	—	
Rarities	Released: 1979; Label: EMI (SD.1); Tracks recorded between 1942 and 1945	—	
Rodeo Riders	Released: 1979; Label: Axis (6386); Tracks recorded between 1960 and 1977	—	
No. 50 The Golden Anniversary Album	Released: April 1981; Label: EMI Music (PLAY1004)	10	
Slim Dusty ....Vintage Album 1	Released: 1982; Label: EMI/Columbia (TC 7998684)	—	
Slim Dusty ....Vintage Album 2	Released: 1983; Label: EMI/Columbia	—	
I Haven't Changed a Bit	Released: 1983; Label: Axis (AX-701306)	—	
The Best of Slim Dusty	Released: 1984; Label: EMI/ Reader's Digest (Oz-RD4-386); 6× LP box set	—	ARIA: Gold
I'll Take Mine Country Style	Released: 1985; Label: Axis (AX-430027)	—	ARIA: Gold
Australia Is His Name	Released: 1985; Label: Thorn EMI; 3× LP box set (7946552)	—	
Slim Dusty ....Vintage Album 3	Released: November 1986; Label: EMI/Columbia	—	
Country Livin'	Released: 23 November 1987; Label: Axis (AX 701372); Tracks recorded between 1957 and 1987	—	
The Heritage Album	Released: 1988; Label: Columbia (SCXO 790140); Tracks recorded between 1955 and 1987	—	ARIA: Platinum
Slim Dusty Sings Stan Coster	Released: 1988; Label: Axis (AXIS 8377242); Tracks recorded between 1963 and 1978	—	
Slim Dusty ....Vintage Album 4	Released: October 1989; Label: EMI/Columbia (OEX 793064)	144	
Henry Lawson and Banjo Paterson	Released: March 1990; Label: Columbia	—	ARIA: Gold
Slim Dusty ....Vintage Album 5	Released: January 1991; Label: EMI/Columbia (OEX 795285)	—	
Slim Dusty Sings Joy McKean	Released: October 1991; Label: EMI/Columbia; Tracks recorded between 1962 and 1986	—	
Travellin' Guitar	Released: February 1992; Label: Tracks recorded between 1958 and 1960	—	
A Land He Calls His Own	Released: August 1992; Label: EMI (251206–208); Tracks recorded between 1966 and 1987; 3× CD box set	—	
The Anniversary Album No. 2 (1943-1993)	Released: December 1993; Label: EMI (7896102)	175	
Regal Zonophone Collection	Released: 16 October 1995; Label: EMI; Tracks recorded between 1946 and 1957; 3×CD set	—	
Country Classics	Released: 1996; Label: Reader's Digest (300701300); Tracks recorded between 1947 and 1995; 3×CD set	—	ARIA: Gold
Old Time Drover's Lament	Released: 1997; Label: EMI; Tracks recorded between 1957 and 1970	—	
Down the Dusty Road	Released: 1998; Label: EMI (724381431627)	—	
Talk About The Good Times	Released: 1998; Label: EMI; Tracks recorded between 1960 and 1975	—	
The Very Best of Slim Dusty	Released: November 1998; Label: EMI (724349572829)	15	ARIA: 5× Platinum
The Man Who Is Australia	Released: July 2000; Label: EMI (724352765321); 5xCD Set	70	
A Piece of Australia	Released: 15 January 2001; Label: EMI (724353107222)	—	ARIA: Platinum
Pubs, Trucks & Plains	Released: March 2007; Label: EMI (094638953227); Tracks recorded between 1960 and 2002; 3×CD set	20	ARIA: Gold
Reunion (credited to The Slim Dusty Family)	Released: March 2008; Label: EMI (5198462)	15	
Sittin' On 80	Released: July 2009; Label: EMI (094638953227); Tracks recorded between 1969 and 2002; 4×CD set	20	
1960's Classic Albums	Released: 28 September 2012; Label: EMI (7056652); 5×CD box set	—	
1970's Classic Albums	Released: 28 September 2012; Label: EMI (7056662); 5×CD box set	—	
1980's Classic Albums	Released: 28 September 2012; Label: EMI (7056672); 5×CD box set	—	
1990's Classic Albums	Released: 28 September 2012; Label: EMI (7056712); 5×CD box set	-	
The Son of Noisy Dan: A Musical Autobiography	Released: 16 August 2013; Label: Universal Music (3747004)	—	
Dusty By the Decades	Released: November 2014; Label: EMI Music (3796113); 6×CD box set	121	
The Den Tapes	Released: 13 November 2015; Label: EMI (4736241); Recorded in the 1990s	27	
Prime Movers	Released: 15 July 2016; Label: EMI (4788793)	43	
Odds and Sods	Released: August 2017; Label: EMI (5749648)	51	
Gone Fishin'	Released: 20 August 2021; Label: EMI (3847882)	11	
Christmas On the Station	Released: 25 November 2022; Label: EMI (4886132)	122	
Gone Truckin'	Released: 4 October 2024; Label: EMI (5861876)	95	
Gone Bush	Released: 6 March 2026; Label: EMI (7844416)	TBA	
"—" denotes a recording that did not chart, position unknown or was not released in that territory.

== Chronological list of all albums ==
1. Slim Dusty Sings (1960)
2. Songs for Rolling Stones (credited to Slim Dusty and His Bushlanders) (1961)
3. Along the Road of Song (1962)
4. Aussie Sing Song (credited to Slim Dusty and His Bushlanders) (1962)
5. Another Aussie Sing Song (credited to Slim Dusty and His Bushlanders) (1963)
6. Songs in the Saddle (1963)
7. Songs of Australia (1964)
8. People and Places (1964) (credited to Slim Dusty and His Bushlanders)
9. Australian Bush Ballads (1965)
10. The Nature of the Man (1966)
11. An Evening with Slim and Joy (1966) (with Joy McKean)
12. Essentially Australian (1967)
13. Songs My Father Sang to Me (1968)
14. Songs from the Cattle Camps (1968)
15. Sing Along with Dad (1968) (with Joy McKean, Anne and David)
16. Cattle Camp Crooner (1969)
17. Slim Dusty Encores (1969)
18. Sing a Happy Song (1970)
19. Songs from the Land I Love (1971)
20. Glory Bound Train (1971)
21. Live at Wagga Wagga (1972)
22. Me and My Guitar (1972)
23. Foolin' Around (1973) (with Joy McKean)
24. The Best of Slim Dusty (1973)
25. Live at Tamworth (1973)
26. Dusty Tracks (1973)
27. Tall Stories and Sad Songs (1973)
28. Australiana (1974)
29. Dinki Di Aussies (1974)
30. The Best of Slim Dusty Volume 2 (1975)
31. Lights on the Hill (1975)
32. Way Out There (1975)
33. Things I See Around Me (1976) (featuring The Travelling Country Band)
34. Give Me the Road (1976) (featuring The Travelling Country Band)
35. This Is Your Life (1976)
36. Songs from Down Under (1976)
37. Slim Dusty Sings His Favourite Songs (1976)
38. Just Slim with Old Friends (1977) (with Barry Thornton, Paul and Colleen Trenwith and Linsday Butler)
39. On the Move (1977) (with The new Travelling Country Band)
40. Travellin' Country Man (1977)
41. To Whom It May Concern (1978)
42. The Entertainer - Live at The Sydney Opera House (1978)
43. A Guitar and a Hat (1979)
44. Spirit of Australia (1979)
45. Slim Dusty Rarities (1979)
46. Rodeo Riders (1979)
47. Walk a Country Mile (1979)
48. The Man Who Steadies the Lead (1980)
49. Slim Dusty Family Album (1980)
50. No 50 - The Golden Anniversary Album (1981)
51. Where Country Is (1981)
52. Vintage Album Volume 1 (1981)
53. Who's Riding Old Harlequin Now (with The Travelling Country Band) (1981)
54. Vintage Album Volume 2 (1982)
55. On the Wallaby (1983)
56. I Haven't Changed a Bit (1983)
57. Trucks on the Track (1983)
58. Slim Dusty Movie (Soundtrack) (1984)
59. The Best of Slim Dusty (1984)
60. I'll Take Mine Country Style (1985)
61. Singer from Down Under (1985)
62. To a Mate (1985)
63. Australia Is His Name (1985)
64. Stories I Wanted to Tell (1986)
65. Vintage Album Volume 3 (1986)
66. Beer Drinking Songs of Australia (1986)
67. Cattlemen from the High Plains (1987)
68. Neon City (1987)
69. Country Livin' (1987)
70. The Heritage Album (1988)
71. Slim Dusty Sings Stan Coster (1988)
72. G'day G'day! (1988)
73. King of Kalgoorlie (1989)
74. Vintage Album Volume 4 (1989)
75. Two Singers One Song(with Anne Kirkpatrick) (1989)
76. Henry Lawson and Banjo Paterson (1990)
77. Coming Home (1990)
78. Slim Dusty Sings Joy McKean (1991)
79. Vintage Album Volume 5 (1991)
80. A Land He Calls Our Own (1992)
81. Live Into the '90s (1992)
82. Travellin' Guitar (1992)
83. That's the Song We're Singing (1992)
84. Ringer from the Top End (1993)
85. The Anniversary Album No. 2 (1943-1993) (1993)
86. Natural High (1994)
87. Country Way of Life (1995)
88. Regal Zonophone Collection (1995)
89. The Slim Dusty Show (Live in Townsville 1956) (1996)
90. Country Classics (1996)
91. 91 Over 50 (1996)
92. A Time to Remember (1997)
93. Talk About the Good Times (1997)
94. Old Time Drover's Lament (1997)
95. Makin' a Mile (1997)
96. Land Of Lots Of Time, EMI Music (1997)
97. Down the Dusty Road (1998)
98. The Very Best of Slim Dusty (1998)
99. Nighty Night (aka '99) (1999)
100. Looking Forward Looking Back (2000)
101. The Man Who Is Australia (2000)
102. A Piece of Australia (2000)
103. Ramblin' Shoes 1953-1976 (2000)
104. Ramblin' Shoes Vol.2 1980-2000 (2000)
105. West of Winton (2001)
106. The Men From Nulla Nulla (with Shorty Ranger) (2001)
107. Travellin' Still...Always Will (with Anne Kirkpatrick) (2002)
108. Columbia Lane - the Last Sessions (2004)
109. Slim Dusty Live (aka Live)(2006)
110. Pubs, Trucks & Plains (2007)
111. Reunion (credited to The Slim Dusty Family) (2008)
112. Sittin' On 80 (2009)
113. I've Been There And Back Again (2011)
114. 1960's Classic Albums (2012)
115. 1970's Classic Albums (2012)
116. 1980's Classic Albums (2012)
117. 1990's Classic Albums (2012)
118. The Son of Noisy Dan: A Musical Autobiography (2013)
119. Dusty By the Decades (2014)
120. The Den Tapes (2015)
121. Prime Movers (2016)
122. Odds and Sods (2017)
123. Slim and I (Soundtrack) (credited to Slim Dusty and various artists) (2020)
124. Gone Fishin' (2021)
125. Christmas On the Station (2022)
126. Gone Truckin' (2024)
127. Live at Tamworth 1996 (As The Slim Dusty Travelling Country Band Reunion Show) (2025)
128. Live at Tamworth 1996 (As The Slim Dusty Family Show) (2025)
129. Gone Bush (2026)

== Charted and/or certified singles ==
During his career, Dusty had five top 40 hits on the Australian charts, with "A Pub With No Beer" and "Duncan" both reaching number one in 1958 and 1980 respectively.

Year	Title	Chart positions		Certifications
Year	Title	AUS	UK	Certifications
1958	"A Pub with No Beer"	1	3	AUS: Gold
1958	"The Answer to a Pub with No Beer"	12	—	
1958	"Sequel to a Pub with No Beer"	23	—	
1960	"Waltzing Matilda"	—	—	ARIA: Gold
1961	"Boomerang"	79	—	
1971	"Darwin (Big Heart of the North)"	71	—	
1974	"Lights on the Hill"	100	—	ARIA: Platinum
1974	"The Biggest Disappointment"	58	—	
1975	"The Melbourne Cup"	91	—	
1979	"A Pub with No Beer" (re-release)	—	—	ARIA: Platinum
1980	"Leave Him in the Long Yard"	—	—	ARIA: Gold
1980	"Duncan"	1	—	ARIA: Platinum
1981	"Country Revival"	99	—	
1983	"The Pub That Doesn't Sell Beer"	94	—	
1987	"We've Done Us Proud"	80	—	
1988	"G'day G'day"	37	—	ARIA: Gold
1991	"Not the Same on the Land"	181	—	
1992	"She'll Be Right, Mate"	129	—	
1992	"Lights on the Hill" (re-release)	181	—	
1993	"Ringer from the Top End"	151	—	ARIA: Gold
1994	"Charleville"	150	—	
2000	"Looking Forward Looking Back"	171	—	ARIA: Gold
