= No. 50 =

Compilation album by Slim Dusty
- Released: April 1981
- Genre: Country
- Label: EMI Music/Columbia Records

Slim Dusty chronology
Slim Dusty Family Album (1980)	No. 50 (1981)	Where Country Is (1981)

No. 50 (subtitled The Golden Anniversary Album) is a compilation album released by Australian country music singer Slim Dusty in April 1981. The album is Dusty's 50th album release and peaked at number 10 on the Kent Music Report, becoming his first top ten album.

== Track listing ==
LP/Cassette

Side A
No.	Title	Writer(s)	Length
1.	"Country Revival"	Slim Dusty	2:38
2.	"Leave Him in the Long Yard"	Henry Lawson, Kelly Dixon, Marion Dixon, Dusty	2:50
3.	"Pub With No Beer"	Gordon Parsons	2:55
4.	"Walk a Country Mile"	Joy McKean	2:43
5.	"Camooweal"	Mack Cormack, Dusty	4:11
6.	"Indian Pacific"	McKean	3:25
7.	"Highway Fever"	Dusty	2:48
8.	"The Man from Snowy River"	Banjo Paterson, Dusty	7:30

Side B
No.	Title	Writer(s)	Length
1.	"Lights on the Hill"	Joy McKean	3:02
2.	"Three Rivers Hotel"	Stan Coster	3:23
3.	"Beat of the Government Stroke"	McKean, Tom Oliver	3:00
4.	"I Don't Sleep at Night"	McKean	3:23
5.	"When the Rain Tumbles Down in July"	Dusty	2:37
6.	"The Angel of Goulburn Hill"	McKean	2:47
7.	"Kelly's Offsider"	McKean	3:25
8.	"Things I See Around Me"	Ernie Constance, Dusty	2:35
9.	"The Biggest Disappointment"	McKean	3:00
10.	"Duncan"	Pat Alexander	2:34

== Weekly charts ==
Chart (1981)	Peak position
Australian Kent Music Report Albums Chart	10

== Release history ==
Region	Date	Format	Edition(s)	Label	Catalogue
Australia	April 1981	LP; Cassette	Standard	Columbia Records, EMI Music	PLAY 1004
Various	January 2006	CD; download	Re-release	Slim Dusty Enterprises	
