= Slim Dusty Live =

Live album by Slim Dusty
- Released: March 2006
- Recorded: 2000
- Studio: Studios 301
- Genre: Country
- Length: 102:47
- Label: EMI Music

Slim Dusty chronology
Columbia Lane – the Last Sessions (2004)	Slim Dusty Live (2006)	Pubs, Trucks & Plains (2007)

Slim Dusty Live (also known simply as Live) is a live album by Australian country music singer Slim Dusty. The album was recorded in 2000, during this Looking Forward Looking Back album tour. It was released in March 2006 and peaked at number 42 on the ARIA Charts.

== Track listing ==
CD1

1. "I'm Going Back to Yarrawonga/Old Bush Shanty of Mine" - 2:28
2. "Leave Him in the Longyard" - 3:29
3. "Introduction" - 1:58
4. "The Saddle Is His Home" - 3:23
5. "I Got You" (performed by Anne Kirkpatrick) - 3:01
6. "Where Country Is" (performed by Anne Kirkpatrick) - 3:47
7. "If I Needed You" (performed by Anne Kirkpatrick) - 3:50
8. "Indian Pacific" (performed by Anne Kirkpatrick) - 3:28
9. "Introduction" - 0:37
10. "Natural High" - 3:07
11. "Looking Forward Looking Back" - 3:45
12. "Never Was at All" - 4:46
13. "Abalinga Mail" - 4:00
14. "Names Upon the Wall" - 3:43
15. "No Good Truckin' Man" - 3:09
16. "Introduction" - 0:54
17. "Man from the Never Never" - 3:30

CD2

1. "The Sunlander" - 2:17
2. "Our Wedding Waltz" - 2:58
3. "Kelly's Offsider" (performed by Joy McKean) - 4:19
4. "Hills of Home" (performed by Joy McKean) - 2:31
5. "Yodel Medley" (performed by McKean Sisters) - 5:48
6. "A Pub with No Beer" - 2:36
7. "Duncan" - 3:13
8. "My Old Pal" - 3:11
9. "Good Heavens Above" - 2:32
10. "Along the Road to Nulla Nulla" - 2:45
11. "Brown Bottle Blue" - 2:50
12. "Claypan Boogie" - 3:34
13. "Introduction" - 1:25
14. "Losing My Blues" - 2:50
15. "Introduction" - 1:48
16. "Lights on the Hill" - 5:15

== Charts ==
Chart (2006)	Peak position
Australian Albums (ARIA)	42

== Release history ==
Region	Date	Format	Label	Catalogue
Australia	March 2006	2xCD	EMI Music	3524912
