= Slim and I =

Australian documentary film

- Directed by: Kriv Stenders
- Produced by: Chris Brown; James Arneman; Aline Jacques
- Starring: Slim Dusty; Joy McKean
- Cinematography: Evan Papageorgiou
- Edited by: Karryn de Cinque
- Music by: Julian Abrahams; Munro Melano
- Distributed by: Screen Australia; Universal Pictures (Australia)
- Release date: 10 September 2020
- Running time: 106 minutes
- Country: Australia
- Language: English

Slim and I is a 2020 Australian documentary film directed by Kriv Stenders about the life of Joy McKean and Slim Dusty, Australia's most successful husband and wife singer-songwriter duo.

== Making of the documentary ==
The documentary came about through the passion of Slim and Joy's grandson James Arneman, who had compiled an archive of old footage of the families touring days. The family was approached by film producer Chris Brown before director Kriv Stenders joined the project. Stenders said "The idea to tell their story through the lens of Joy was something that I found very interesting about this project and made me want to be involved the documentary. I knew very little about Slim and Joy, but I listened to their music and read the books about their lives and discovered such an incredible story that needed to be told."

== Cinematic launch ==
Slim and I was released in Australian cinemas in September 2020, during the COVID-19 pandemic, which delayed the film's release in the State of Victoria. The world première took place in Kempsey, New South Wales, close to where Slim Dusty grew up. The Governor of New South Wales Margaret Beazley attended the red carpet event, along with the Member for Oxley Melinda Pavey and Kempsey Shire Mayor Liz Campbell. Joy McKean also attended along with children Anne and David Kirkpatrick, director Kriv Stenders and producer Aline Jacques. The film reached Australian cinemas on 10 September 2020.

== Critical reception ==
Following its Australian premiere, the film received rave reviews. The Sydney Morning Herald's Paul Byrnes gave it four stars and called it "pure joy, in more ways than one". The Australian newspaper review by Stephen Romei called it a "brilliant love story" and an "utterly charming film", and also gave four stars. Anthony Morris for Screenhub gave it four stars and wrote: "This fast moving, insightful and always entertaining film is firmly a tribute to Joy, and rightly so: if Slim Dusty was 'the man who is Australia', she was the woman who made the man." Out in Perth gave it four and a half stars and wrote "After viewing this very Australian story, you are left questioning why this wasn’t made years ago."

== Awards and nominations ==
Award	Date of ceremony	Category	Result	Ref(s)
Gold Coast Film Festival Awards	2020	Best Australian Film	Won	

== Soundtrack ==
Slim and I

Soundtrack album by Slim Dusty and various artists
- Released: 4 September 2020
- Genre: Country
- Label: EMI Music

Slim Dusty albums chronology
Prime Movers (Slim Dusty) (2016)	Slim and I (2020)

A soundtrack was released on 4 September 2020.

=== Track listing ===
No.	Title	Writer(s)	Performer	Length
1.	"Prologue"
2.	"I Dont Believe You"		Small Town Romance featuring Anne Kirkpatrick
3.	"A Lifetime on the Road (Interview)"		Joy McKean
4.	"When I First Saw the Lovelight in Your Eyes" (1995 version)		Slim Dusty with Joy McKean
5.	"Music & Belonging (Interview)"		Troy Cassar-Daley
6.	"The Biggest Disappointment" (acoustic)		Troy Cassar-Daley
7.	"Learning To Sing (Interview)"		Joy McKean
8.	"Moonrise Lullaby"		Joy McKean and Heather McKean
9.	"Slim Jumps the Shark (Interview)"		Dobe Newton
10.	"When the Rain Tumbles Down in July" (1998 Remaster)		Slim Dusty
11.	"Cinematic Songwriting (Interview) - Paul Kelly"		Paul Kelly
12.	"Indian Pacific" (1998 Remaster)		Slim Dusty
13.	"Keen Young Songwriters (Interview)"		Joy McKean
14.	"My Hometown"		Joy McKean and Heather McKean
15.	"Slim's Courtship of Joy (Interview)"		Joy McKean and Heather McKean
16.	"What's It Gonna Cost Me"		Joy McKean
17.	"Kasey Chambers & Bill Chambers (Interview) and "Walk a Country Mile Excerpt"" (Acoustic)		Kasey Chambers & Bill Chambers
18.	"Touring Begins in 1954 (Interview)"		Joy McKean
19.	"Closest Thing to Freedom"		Slim Dusty
20.	"Origins of "A Pub With No Beer" (Interview)"		Joy McKean
21.	"A Pub With No Beer" (Soundtrack Version)	Gordon Parsons	Slim Dusty and Gordon Parsons
22.	"Memories of the Showgrounds (Interview)"		Don Walker
23.	"Whiplash"		Slim Dusty
24.	"Leaving the Showgrounds (Interview)"		Joy McKean
25.	"Losin' My Blues Tonight" (Soundtrack Version)		Slim Dusty
26.	"Writing and Performing on Country (Interview)"		Gayle Kennedy
27.	"Plains of Peppimenarti" (1998 Remaster)		Slim Dusty
28.	"Music At Odds With the Lyrics (Interview)"		Paul Kelly
29.	"Lights on the Hill" (1998 Remaster)		Slim Dusty
30.	"A Voice for Rural People (Interview)"		Joy McKean
31.	"Further Out"		Slim Dusty
32.	"Writing for Slim (Interview)"		Bill Chambers
33.	"Things Are Not the Same on the Land" (acoustic)		Bill Chambers
34.	"Simple Songs (Interview)"		Missy Higgins
35.	"The Biggest Disappointment"		Missy Higgins and Dan Sultan
36.	"Epilogue (Interview)"		Joy McKean
37.	"One Helluva Song"		Slim Dusty

=== Charts ===
==== Weekly charts ====
Chart performance of Slim and I
Chart (2020)	Peak position
Australian Albums (ARIA)	8

==== Year-end charts ====
Chart (2020)	Position
Australian Top Country (ARIA)	21

=== Release history ===
Region	Date	Format	Label	Catalogue
Australia	4 September 2020	CD	EMI Music	0748837

== See also ==
- Cinema of Australia
- Australian country music
