= The Best of Slim Dusty =

Greatest hits album by Slim Dusty
- Released: 1984
- Recorded: 1947–1983
- Genre: Country music
- Label: Reader's Digest (Australia)/EMI Music

Slim Dusty chronology
Slim Dusty Movie (1984)	The Best of Slim Dusty (1984)	I'll Take Mine Country Style (1985)

The Best of Slim Dusty is a 6xLP greatest hits album by Australian country recording artist Slim Dusty, released through Reader's Digest. The six albums had different themes, Biggest Hits, Truckin' Along, with Family, Sentimental Slim, with Joy McKean and Singalong. In 1999, the album was certified gold.

== Track listing ==
LP 1 Slim Dusty - Biggest Hits

Side A

1. "Pub With No Beer"
2. "Duncan"
3. "Three Rivers Hotel"
4. "Indian Pacific"
5. "You Can Never Do Wrong in a Mother's Eyes"
6. "Winter Winds"
7. "By a Fire of Gidgee Coal"

Side B

1. "When the Rain Tumbles Down in July"
2. "Sweeney"
3. "The Man from Snowy River"
4. "Camooweal"
5. "Trumby"

LP 2 Slim Dusty - Truckin' Along

Side A

1. "Lights on the Hill"
2. "One Truckie's Epitaph"
3. "I Don't Sleep at Night"
4. "Rocky's Run"
5. You Take Her to Narrandera"
6. "Kelly's Offsider"

Side B

1. "Truckin's in My Blood"
2. "Road Train Blues"
3. "A Truckie's Last Will and Testament"
4. "Angel of Goulburn Hill"
5. "Pushin' Time"
6. "Highway Fever"

LP3 Slim Dusty & Family

Side A

1. "Sing Along with Dad"
2. "Daddy's Girl"
3. "We'll Have to Stick Together"
4. "County Livin'"
5. "The Old Rugged Cross"
6. "I Haven't Changed a Bit"

Side B

1. "Glory Bound Train"
2. "Dear Old Sunny South By the Sea"
3. "I've Been Talking to Grannie"
4. "In My Hour of Darkness"
5. "Nobody Heard"
6. "The Biggest Disappointment"

LP4 Slim Dusty - Sentimental Slim

Side A

1. "Love's Game of Let's Pretend"
2. "Old Love Letters"
3. "Our Wedding Waltz"
4. "Lovin' My Blues Tonight"
5. "Maple Sugar Sweetheart"
6. "Keep the Lovelight Shining"

Side B

1. "Sunny Northern Rose"
2. "She Wasn't There to Meet Me"
3. "Big Beggin' Fool"
4. "When the Harvest Days are Over Jessie Dear"
5. "If You Walk Out That Gate"
6. "I'll Come Around"

LP5 Slim Dusty & Joy McKean

Side A

1. "Happiest Days of All"
2. "Leave Him in the Long Yard"
3. "The Kingdom I Call Home"
4. "The Day I Married You"
5. "When It's Lamplighting Time in the Valley"
6. "'Cause I Have You"

Side B

1. "This Song Is Just for You"
2. "Morning Mail"
3. "My Love's a Stranger Now"
4. "The Long Road"
5. "Down the Dusty Road to Home"
6. "Calvary Hill"

LP6 Slim Dusty Singalong

Side A

1. "Along The Road to Gundagai"/"(I'm Going Back To) Yarrawonga"/"The Man from the Never Never"/"That Old Bush Shanty of Mine"
2. "Murray Moon"/"Beautiful Queensland"/"Our Wedding Waltz"
3. "My Home on the Sunburnt Plains"/"The Dying Stockman"/"I'm Gonna Hump My Bluey"
4. "Click Go the Shears"/"The Overlander Trail"/"Waltzing Matilda"
5. "The Whispering Bush"/"Little Boy Lost"/"Suvla Bay"
6. "The Old Sundowner"/"The Silver in My Mother's Hair"/"Now Is the Hour"

Side B

1. "Keep the Homefires Burning"/"Pack Up Your Troubles"/"A Brown Slouch Hat"/"It's a Long Way to Tipperary"
2. "Boomerang"/"Tie Me Kangaroo Down"/"Where the Dog Sits on the Tuckerbox"
3. "When a Boy from Alabama Meets a Girl from Gundagai"/"(A Little Boy Called) Smiley"/"(A) Town Like Alice"
4. "Sequel to The Pub With No Beer"
5. "Never, Never"
6. "By the Eumerella Shore"/"The Wild Colonial Boy"

== Certifications ==
Region	Certification	Certified units/sales
Australia (ARIA)	Gold	35,000^{^}
^{^} Shipments figures based on certification alone.

== Release history ==
Region	Date	Format	Label	Catalogue
Australia	1984	6x LP	Reader's Digest (Australia) / EMI Music	RD4-386
