= Country Classics (Slim Dusty album) =

Greatest hits album by Slim Dusty
- Released: 1996
- Recorded: 1947–1995
- Genre: Country music
- Label: Reader's Digest (Australia)

Slim Dusty chronology
The Slim Dusty Show (Live in Townsville 1956) (1996)	Country Classics (1996)	91 Over 50 (1996)

Country Classics is a 3CD greatest hits album by Australian country recording artist Slim Dusty, released through Reader's Digest. The album was separated into three periods of Dusty's career; The Early Years, The Middle Years and The Later Years. In 1999, the album was certified gold.

== Track listing ==
CD1 - The Early Years (1947-1969)

1. "When the Rain Tumbles Down in July" (Original Version)
2. "My Aussie Home"
3. "Sat'day in the Saddle"
4. "Springtime On the Range"
5. "The Grandest Homestead of All"
6. "When the Sun Goes Down Outback"
7. "The Rain Still Tumbles Down"
8. "Our Wedding Waltz" (written by Joy McKean)
9. "King Bundawaal"
10. "Pub With No Beer" (Original Version) (written by Gordon Parsons)
11. "Saddle Boy"
12. "Along the Road to Gundagai" (written by Jack O'Hagan)
13. "By a Fire of Gidgee Coal" (written by Stan Coster and Slim Dusty)
14. "Song of Australia"
15. "Middleton's Rouseabout" (written by Henry Lawson and Slim Dusty)
16. "Down the Dusty Road to Home" (written by Joe Daly and Slim Dusty)
17. "Campfire Yarn" (written by Stan Coster and Slim Dusty)
18. "The Old Lantern Waltz"
19. "Ghosts of the Golden Mile" (written by Joy McKean and Slim Dusty)
20. "Steppin' Round Australia"
21. "Cattle Camp Crooner"

CD2 - The Middle Years (1971-1979)

1. "Camooweal" (written by Mack Cormack and Slim Dusty)
2. "Australian Bushman" (written by Stan Coster)
3. "Glory Bound Train"
4. "The Man from Snowy River" (written by A. B. "Banjo" Paterson and Slim Dusty)
5. "The Birdsville Track" (written by Stan Coster)
6. "The Man from Iron Bark" (written by A. B. "Banjo" Paterson and Slim Dusty)
7. "Clancy of the Overflow" (written by A. B. "Banjo" Paterson and Slim Dusty)
8. "Henry Lawson" (written by Stan Coster)
9. "Lights on the Hill" (written by Joy McKean)
10. "Things I See Around Me" (written by Ernie Constance and Slim Dusty)
11. "Three Rivers Hotel" (written by Stan Coster)
12. "Kelly's Offsider" (written by Joy McKean)
13. "Bush Poets of Australia" (written by N. Hauritz and Joy McKean)
14. "Indian Pacific" (written by Joy McKean)
15. "Isa" (written by Ross Ryan)
16. "Spirit of Australia"
17. "Losin' My Blues Tonight"
18. "Walk a Country Mile" (written by Joy McKean)
19. "When the Rain Tumbles Down in July" (Later Version)
20. "Pub With No Beer" (Later Version) (written by Gordon Parsons)

CD3 - The Later Years (1980-1995)

1. "Duncan" (written by Pat Alexander)
2. "Leave Him in the Longyard" (written by K. Dixon, M. Dixon and Slim Dusty)
3. "Plains of Peppimentari"
4. "Country Revival"
5. "G'Day Blue" (written by Ron Ellis)
6. "Nulla Creek" (written by Joy McKean)
7. "Last Thing to Learn" (written by Mack Cormack and Joy McKean)
8. "Old Time Country Halls"
9. "Singer from Down Under"
10. "Bible of the Bush" (written by Slim Dusty and Joy McKean)
11. "Regal Zonophone"
12. "Drovin'" (written by Bob Brown)
13. "Crying On Each Other's Shoulders"
14. "That's the Song We're Singing"
15. "Jack O'Hagan" (written by Johnny Greenwood)
16. "Charleville" (written by Don Walker)
17. "Ringer from the Top End" (written by Joy McKean)
18. "When Your Pants Begin to Go" (written by Henry Lawson and Joy McKean)
19. "Me and Matilda" (written by Tom Oliver and Slim Dusty)
20. "Who Wants Moss?" (written by Joy McKean)

NB: All songs written by Slim Dusty unless otherwise noted.

== Certifications ==
Region	Certification	Certified units/sales
Australia (ARIA)	Gold	35,000^{^}
^{^} Shipments figures based on certification alone.

== Release history ==
Region	Date	Format	Label	Catalogue
Australia	1996	3x CD	Reader's Digest (Australia)	300701300
