= 91 over 50 =

Live album by Slim Dusty
- Released: August 1996
- Recorded: 26–27 April 1996
- Studio: Studios 301
- Genre: Country
- Length: 45:00
- Label: EMI Music

Slim Dusty chronology
Country Classics (1996)	91 over 50 (1996)	A Time to Remember (1997)

91 over 50 is a live album by Australian country music singer Slim Dusty. The album was Dusty's 91st album, recorded over 50 years. It was released in August 1996 and peaked at number 46 on the ARIA Charts.

Dusty said "For Me, each of these great old songs has come to life again, mainly because I had the opportunity to stand up and sing them in a studio environment 'live' feeling the story and seeing them again in my mind as the words and melodies come alive."

== Track listing ==
No.	Title	Writer(s)	Length
1.	"Born a Traveling Man"	Keith Urban Peter Clarke	3:06
2.	"I Hope They Fight Again"	Slim Dusty	3:30
3.	"A Word to Texas Jack"	Dusty	3:09
4.	"How Will I Go with Him Mate?"	Dusty	3:25
5.	"Must've Been a Hell of a Party"	Dusty, Tom Oliver	2:59
6.	"Gum Trees by the Roadway"	Dusty	2:59
7.	"Do You Think That I Don't Know" (featuring Anne Kirkpatrick)	Slim Dusty, Henry Lawson	3:16
8.	"Ned Kelley Was a Gentleman"	Dusty, Joy McKean	2:51
9.	"Cattlecamp Crooner"	Dusty	3:15
10.	"Ringer's Stomp"	Dusty	3:52
11.	"Duncan" (featuring Rolf Harris)	Patrick Alexander	3:29
12.	"Kelly's Offsider"	Dusty, McKean	3:01
13.	"When the Rain Tumbles Down in July"	Dusty	3:23
14.	"Old Time Country Halls" (featuring Anne Kirkpatrick and Joy McKean)	Dusty	2:45

== Charts ==
Chart (1996)	Peak position
Australian Albums (ARIA)	46

== Certifications ==
Certifications for 91 over 50
Region	Certification	Certified units/sales
Australia (ARIA) with Columbia Lane – the Last Sessions	Gold	35,000^{‡}
^{‡} Sales+streaming figures based on certification alone.

== Release history ==
Region	Date	Format	Label	Catalogue
Australia	August 1996	CD	EMI Music	8147122
