= The Slim Dusty Movie =

- Directed by: Rob Stewart
- Written by: Kent Chadwick
- Produced by: Kent Chadwick
- Starring: Slim Dusty; Joy McKean; Jon Blake
- Cinematography: David Eggby
- Edited by: Ken Sallows
- Production company: The Slim Dusty Movie Pty. Ltd
- Distributed by: Greater Union Film Distributors; Umbrella Entertainment; Universal Pictures
- Release dates: 10 August 1984 (Mount Isa); 18 October 1984 (Australia)
- Running time: 107 minutes
- Country: Australia
- Language: English
- Budget: A$2.3 million.

The Slim Dusty Movie is a 1984 Australian feature film directed by Rob Stewart and starring Slim Dusty, Joy McKean, Jon Blake and Mary Charleston.

== The film ==
The film dramatises the early life and career of Australian country music singer/songwriter Slim Dusty, interspersed with footage of a 1980s round Australia tour by the Slim Dusty family and featuring several songs from Dusty's long career, including Pub With No Beer, When the Rain Tumbles Down in July, Lights on the Hill and Indian Pacific. Slim Dusty was Australia's most prolific musical artist, who died in 2003 while working on his 106th album for EMI Records. His wife Joy McKean and children Anne Kirkpatrick and David Kirpatrick are all accomplished country music singers who perform in the film on stage with Dusty. A number of Dusty's songwriters and old friends appear in the film, including Stan Coster and Gordon Parsons.

Directed by Rob Stewart (whose credits include 1983's For the Term of His Natural Life) and with cinematography by David Eggby (Mad Max, 1979), the film features Australian landscapes prominently and is essentially a biographical documentary. Shot in diverse locations, it includes live performances at the Sydney Opera House, Bowen, Charters Towers, Mount Isa, the Peppimenarti, Northern Territory aboriginal settlement and elsewhere.

== Cast ==
- Slim Dusty as himself
- Joy McKean as herself
- Anne Kirkpatrick as herself
- David Kirkpatrick as himself
- Brett Lewis as Shorty Ranger
- Dean Stidworthy as Young Slim Dusty
- Jon Blake as Young Slim Dusty
- Mary Charleston as Young Heather McKean
- Earl Francis as the Country Radio announcer
- Jeanette Leigh as Milkbar waitress
- Sandy Paul as Young Joy McKean
- Beverley Phillips as Slim's mother
- Jimmy Sharman as himself
- Tom Travers as Slim's father
- James Wright as City Radio announcer

== Crew ==
Director: Rob Stewart
Producer: Kent Chadwick
Cinematography: David Eggby
Music Producer: Rod Coe
Audio Post: Roger Savage
Sound Recordist: Paul Clarke
Sound Assistant: Chris Piper
Concert Sound Mixer: Clive Jones

== Box office ==
The Slim Dusty Movie grossed $225,000 at the box office in Australia.

== Soundtrack ==
A soundtrack was released from the movie. It peaked at number 73 on the Australian Kent Music Report.

The Slim Dusty Movie

Soundtrack album by Slim Dusty
- Released: August 1984
- Genre: Country
- Label: EMI Music
- Producer: Rod Coe

Slim Dusty chronology
Trucks on the Track (1983)	The Slim Dusty Movie (1984)	The Best of Slim Dusty (1984)

=== Track listing ===
LP/Cassette

Side A
No.	Title	Length
1.	"Where Country Is"	3:33
2.	"Song for the Aussies"	2:46
3.	"Old Sunlander Van" (performed by Anne Kirkpatrick)	2:39
4.	"Walk a Country Mile"	3:09
5.	"Wind Up Gramophone" (performed by Joy McKean)	2:51
6.	"Trouble" (performed by David Kirkpatrick)	2:10
7.	"Losin' My Blues Tonight"	3:23
8.	"Only The Two of Us Here / Old Fellar" (performed with Lew Williams)	5:39

Side B
No.	Title	Length
1.	"My Final Song"	2:08
2.	"When the Rain Tumbles Down in July"	1:52
3.	"Rehearsal Sequence Back to My Old Northern Home" (performed by Buck Taylor)	1:35
4.	"Old Time Country Halls"	3:29
5.	"The Biggest Disappointment" (with Buck Taylor)	3:05
6.	"Lights on the Hill"	3:05
7.	"Gymkhana Yodel" (performed by McKean Sisters)	3:19
8.	"Stay Away from Me"	2:54
9.	"Keep the Lovelight Shining" (with Joy McKean)	1:36

Side C
No.	Title	Length
1.	"The Man With the Hat Turn" (performed by Buddy Weston)	1:37
2.	"Country Revival"	2:04
3.	"Isa Rodeo"	2:39
4.	"Roughriders"	2:09
5.	"Cunnamulla Fella"	2:43
6.	"Isa"	2:58
7.	"Just Rollin'"	3:26
8.	"Corroboree Sequence / Plains of Peppimimenarti" (performed with Gordon Parsons)	4:20

Side D
No.	Title	Length
1.	"How Will I Go With Him Mate?"	3:48
2.	"Pushin' Time"	2:36
3.	"A Pub With No Beer" (with Gordon Parsons)	3:41
4.	"Camooweal"	3:04
5.	"Indian Pacific"	2:45
6.	"Are the Good Days Gone Forever"	3:32
7.	"Gumtrees By the Roadway"	3:06

=== Release history ===
Region	Date	Format	Label	Catalogue
Australia	August 1984	2xLP; Cassette	EMI Music	VMP.430004/2

== See also ==
- Cinema of Australia
