= The Biggest Disappointment =

"The Biggest Disappointment" is an Australian country music song written by Joy McKean and made famous by her husband, Slim Dusty. It has been covered by artists including Missy Higgins, Troy Cassar-Daley, Beccy Cole, and Gina Jeffreys.

== About the song ==
The lyrics begin "They had my future wrapped up in a parcel / And no one even thought of asking me" and the song progresses to tell the story of a "quiet country boy" who leaves home to follow his dreams, only to face "a lot more dinner times than there were dinners" as he tries to live on nothing, becoming "the biggest disappointment" to his family.

The song features in the 2020 Australian documentary Slim and I about the life and musical partnership of Slim Dusty and Joy McKean. Contemporary artists Dan Sultan and Missy Higgins perform the song, and McKean reveals that she wrote it about Dusty's own experiences in early life, and that he believed it was the best song she ever wrote.
