= Country Classics =

Country Classics may refer to:

- Country Classics (Juice Newton album)
- Country Classics (Slim Dusty album)
- Country Classics: A Tapestry of Our Musical Heritage, an album by Joey + Rory
- Country Classics, the British alternative title to the Suzy Bogguss album, Moment of Truth
