= Pubs, Trucks & Plains =

Compilation album by Slim Dusty
- Released: March 2007
- Genre: Country
- Length: 3:15:32
- Label: EMI Music

Slim Dusty chronology
Slim Dusty Live (2006)	Pubs, Trucks & Plains (2007)	Reunion (2008)

Pubs, Trucks & Plains is a 3-CD set, compilation album released by Australian country music singer Slim Dusty. The album was released in March 2007 to celebrate the 50th anniversary of his single "A Pub with No Beer"; which was the biggest-selling record by an Australian at that time, the first Australian single to be certified gold.

Pubs, Trucks & Plains peaked at number 20 on the ARIA charts and was certified gold.

== Track listing ==
CD1

1. "A Pub with No Beer" (1979 version)- 3:01
2. "Born with an Endless Thirst" - 4:31
3. "The Bloke Who Serves the Beer" - 3:01
4. "Duncan" - 2:35
5. "Must've Been a Hello of a Party" (live)- 2:59
6. "Three Rivers Hotel" - 3:22
7. "Wobbly Boot" (featuring Rolf Harris) - 2:58
8. "He's a Good Bloke When He's Sober" - 3:37
9. "Drowning My Blues" - 2:29
10. "Brown Bottle Blues" - 2:52
11. "Old Bush Pub" - 2:43
12. "Callaghan's Hotel" - 2:47
13. "Pay Day at the Pub" - 3:18
14. "Joe Maguire's Pub" - 2:58
15. "Nebo Pub" - 3:06
16. "Finney's Home Brew" - 3:43
17. "Little Old One Horse Pub" - 2:37
18. "The Pub Rock" - 2:34
19. "The Answer to the Pub with No Beer" - 2:48
20. "A Pub with No Beer" (1957 version) - 2:58

CD2

1. "No Good Truckin' Man" - 2:30
2. "Bent-Axle Bob" - 2:47
3. "Under the Spell of Highway One" - 3:40
4. "Pushin' Time" - 2:54
5. "Long Black Road" - 3:18
6. "Names Upon the Wall" - 3:19
7. "Gotta Keep Movin'" - 3:11
8. "Truckin's in My Blood" - 3:11
9. "Dieseline Dreams" - 3:22
10. "The Lady Is a Truckie" - 3:31
11. "Rolling Down the Road" - 4:07
12. "Kelly's Offsider" - 3:24
13. "Star Trucker" - 4:13
14. "Highway One" - 3:07
15. "Something in the Pilliga" - 4:00
16. "Trucks, Tarps and Trailers" - 3:29
17. "Sally (The Girl on Channel 8)" - 4:07
18. "Mechanised Swaggie" - 3:17
19. "Lights on the Hill" - 3:03
20. "One Truckie's Epitaph" - 3:33

CD3

1. "Hard, Hard Country" - 2:31
2. "Back to the Old Saltbush Plains" - 2:09
3. "When the Rain Tumbles Down in July" - 2:43
4. "Land of No Second Chance" - 3:42
5. "The Birdsville Track" - 3:15
6. "Plains of Peppimenarti" - 3:15
7. "By a Fire of Gidgee Coal" - 3:01
8. "Things I See Around Me" - 2:39
9. "Indian Pacific" - 3:31
10. Cattlemen from the High Plains" - 3:10
11. "Things Are Not the Same on the Land" - 3:02
12. "Walk a Country Mile" - 2:53
13. "Cunnamulla Fella" - 2:13
14. "Keela Valley" (credited to His Bushlanders)- 2:22
15. "Paddy William" - 4:33
16. "The Drovers are Back" - 3:08
17. "Trumby" - 3:29
18. "Gumtrees by the Roadway" (live) - 2:59
19. "The Man from Snowy River" - 7:47
20. "End of the Bitumen" - 4:10

== Charts ==
=== Weekly charts ===
Chart (2007)	Peak position
Australian Albums (ARIA)	20

=== Year-end charts ===
Chart (2007)	Position
Australian Country (ARIA)	9

== Certifications ==
Region	Certification	Certified units/sales
Australia (ARIA)	Gold	35,000^{^}
^{^} Shipments figures based on certification alone.

== Release history ==
Region	Date	Format	Label	Catalogue
Various	15 July 2016	3x CD; digital download	Slim Dusty Enterprises, EMI Music	094638953227
