= Out of the Blue (Anne Kirkpatrick album) =

Studio album by Anne Kirkpatrick
- Released: 1991
- Recorded: 1990
- Studio: The Vault, ABC Studio 221; Sydney
- Genre: Country
- Length: 42:22
- Label: ABC/Phonogram
- Producer: Mark Moffatt

Anne Kirkpatrick chronology
Two Singers One Song (1989)	Out of the Blue (1991)	The Best of Anne Kirkpatrick (1991)

Out of the Blue is the seventh studio album released by Australian country music singer Anne Kirkpatrick. The album was released in 1991. The album has been heralded as "a watershed album in Australian country music" and Kirkpatrick's "breakthrough album".

At the ARIA Music Awards of 1992, Kirkpatrick was awarded the ARIA Award for Best Country Album; this was Kirkpatrick's first ARIA Award.

At the Country Music Awards of Australia of 1992, Kirkpatrick won two golden guitar's; "Album of the Year" and "Female Vocalist of the Year" for the track "I Guess We've Been Together Too Long". This is the second time Kirkpatrick has won this award; her last coming in 1979.

== Track listing ==
No.	Title	Writer(s)	Length
1.	"I Guess We've Been Together for Too Long"	Guy Clark, Rodney Crowell	2:41
2.	"Train Wreck of Emotion"	Alan Rhody, Jon Vezner	3:28
3.	"I Don't Go Back Any More"	Mike Reid, Troy Seals	3:07
4.	"Take Your Time"		3:19
5.	"A Bottle of Wine and Patsy Cline"	Melinda Anne Gravelle, Tommy Rocco	3:18
6.	"Out of the Blue"	Ray Morris	4:00
7.	"The Same Mistake"		3:32
8.	"Sight for Sore Eyes"	Clark, Vince Gill	3:01
9.	"Broken Bleeding Hurtin' Heart"	Genni Kane	2:46
10.	"Sweet Moments"		2:13
11.	"The Dance"	Kane, Chris Watson	4:25
12.	"There Goes My Heart Again"		3:36
13.	"Goodbye"	Arthur Baysting, Jean McAllister	2:46

== Release history ==
Region	Date	Format	Edition(s)	Label	Catalogue
Australia	1991	CD; Cassette	Standard	ABC Records/Phonogram	846595-2
