= Prime Movers (album) =

Compilation album by Slim Dusty
- Released: 15 July 2016
- Genre: Country
- Label: EMI Music

Slim Dusty chronology
The Den Tapes (2015)	Prime Movers (2016)	Slim and I (2020)

Prime Movers is a compilation album released by Australian country music singer Slim Dusty. The album was released in July 2016 and peaked at number 43 on the ARIA charts.

== Background and release ==
Over his career Slim Dusty recorded 80 plus original Aussie 'trucking' songs and his six standalone trucking albums achieved sales well in excess of half a million copies. In March 2007, a 3-disc Slim Dusty compilation titled Pubs, Trucks & Plains was released which peaked at number 20 onto ARIA Charts and was certified gold. This single disc version makes all of Slim Dusty's best trucking songs available on one disc.

== Reception ==
Kix Country said "Prime Movers is a best of style collection of 20 of Slim's classic trucking songs and is the ideal quick fix for any truckie, or even a quick way for the uninitiated to understand the great Aussie truckie psyche."

== Track listing ==
1. "No Good Truckin' Man" - 2:30
2. "Bent-Axle Bob" (credited to Slim Dusty and The Travelling Country Band) - 2:47
3. "Under the Spell of Highway One" - 3:40
4. "Pushin' Time" (featuring The Travelling Country Band) - 2:54
5. "Long Black Road" - 3:18
6. "Names Upon the Wall" - 3:19
7. "Gotta Keep Moving" - 3:11
8. "Truckin's in My Blood" (credited to Slim Dusty and The Travelling Country Band) - 3:10
9. "Dieseline Dreams" - 3:22
10. "The Lady Is a Truckie" - 3:31
11. "Rolling Down the Road" - 4:06
12. "Kelly's Offsider" - 3:24
13. "Star Trucker" - 4:13
14. "Highway One" - 3:07
15. "Something in the Pilliga" - 4:00
16. "Trucks Tarps and Trailers" - 3:28
17. "Sally (The Girl on Channel 8)" - 4:07
18. "Mechanised Swaggie" - 3:16
19. "Lights on the Hill" (credited to Slim Dusty and The Travelling Country Band) - 3:03
20. "One Truckie's Epitaph" (credited to Slim Dusty and The Travelling Country Band) - 3:33

== Charts ==
Chart (2016)	Peak position
Australian Albums (ARIA)	43

== Release history ==
Region	Date	Format	Label	Catalogue
Various	15 July 2016	CD; digital download	Slim Dusty Enterprises, EMI Music	4788793
