= The Den Tapes =

Compilation album by Slim Dusty
- Released: 15 November 2015
- Recorded: 1990s
- Genre: Country
- Length: 32:14
- Label: EMI Music

Slim Dusty chronology
The Son of Noisy Dan (2013)	The Den Tapes (2015)	Prime Movers (2016)

The Den Tapes is a compilation album released by Australian country music singer Slim Dusty. The album features all previously, last known unreleased recordings by Slim Dusty. The songs were recorded on cassette by Dusty in his small office 'den' at his home. The album was released in November 2015 and peaked at number 27 on the ARIA charts.

The album was released to coincide with the opening of The Slim Dusty Centre and Museum in Kempsey.

== Background and release ==
Sometime in the late 1990s, Slim begun recording and collating these private recordings of his favourite songs from his youth. These are traditional Australian songs which he grew up listening to back on his family farm, they are songs which inspired and shaped his own future musical direction. Slim's longtime producer Rod Coe discovered this personal collection of solo recordings on a single cassette by sheer accident when looking for something else. Slims wife and songwriter Joy McKean said "The songs you have here are some of those he heard and learned from the radio and the old portable gramophone when he was just a quiet country boy up in the isolated Nulla Nulla Creek."

== Track listing ==
1. "Move Along Baldy" (Tex Morton) - 3:14
2. "Good Old Droving Days" (Tex Morton) - 3:39
3. "Rocky Ned" (Tex Morton) - 3:30
4. "Old Boko & Me" (Tex Morton/Lance Skuthorpe) - 3:11
5. "Rover No More" (Louis Lavater) - 3:03
6. "Where the White Faced Cattle Roam" (Buddy Williams) - 3:07
7. "You'll Never Be Missed" (trad.) - 3:30
8. "Just Plain Folk" (Maurice Stonehill)- 3:13
9. "My Old Pal" (Elsie McWilliams/Jimmie Rodgers)- 2:43
10. "Murrumbidgee Jack" (Frances Coughlan)- 3:04

== Charts ==
Chart (2015)	Peak position
Australian Albums (ARIA)	27

== Release history ==
Region	Date	Format	Edition(s)	Label	Catalogue
Various	13 November 2015	CD; digital download	Standard	Slim Dusty Enterprises, EMI Music	4736243
Australia	15 January 2016	LP	Vinyl	EMI Music	4736241
