= Columbia Lane – the Last Sessions =

Studio album by Slim Dusty
- Released: 1 March 2004
- Recorded: 2003
- Venue: Columbia Lane Studios
- Genre: Country
- Length: 27:14
- Label: EMI Music
- Producers: Rod Coe, Mark Punch

Slim Dusty chronology
| Travellin' Still...Always Will (2002) | Columbia Lane – the Last Sessions (2004) | Slim Dusty Live (2006) |

Counting compilations, recorded live performances, the 1984 movie soundtrack, reissues, box sets and so forth, Columbia Lane – the Last Sessions is the 58th, 106th overall and final studio album released by Australian country music singer Slim Dusty, whom was recording the album when he died on 19 September 2003. The album was posthumously released, albeit unfinished, on 1 March 2004.

At the ARIA Music Awards of 2004, the album was nominated for Best Country Album.

== Track listing ==
| No. | Title | Writer(s) | Length |
|---|---|---|---|
| 1. | "Blue Hills (in the Distance)" | John Dohling | 3:27 |
| 2. | "Rolling Down the Road" | Chris Cook, Karen Williams, Wayne Bromwich | 4:06 |
| 3. | "Nature’s Gentleman" | James Blundell | 2:28 |
| 4. | "Answer to Billy" | Dohling | 3:15 |
| 5. | "Long Distance Driving" | Ace Fender | 4:30 |
| 6. | "Gonna Take My Dog for a Run" | Kenny Blake, Kenny White | 3:21 |
| 7. | "Get Along" | Don Walker | 3:35 |

== Charts ==
Columbia Lane – the Last Sessions debuted at number 5 in the Australian album charts and number one on the country charts for the week commencing 8 March 2004. The album was certified gold within two weeks of release.

=== Weekly charts ===
| Chart (2004) | Peak position |
|---|---|
| Australian Albums (ARIA) | 5 |

=== Year-end charts ===
| Chart (2004) | Position |
|---|---|
| Australian Country Albums (ARIA) | 2 |

== Certifications ==
| Region | Certification | Certified units/sales |
|---|---|---|
| Australia (ARIA) | Gold | 35,000^{^} |
| Australia (ARIA) with 91 over 50 | Gold | 35,000^{‡} |
^{^} Shipments figures based on certification alone.^{‡} Sales+streaming figures based on certification alone.

== Release history ==
| Region | Date | Format | Edition(s) | Label | Catalogue |
|---|---|---|---|---|---|
| Australia | 1 March 2004 | CD; Cassette | Standard | Slim Dusty Enterprises, EMI Music | 5772902 |
| Australia | 13 July 2018 | LP | Limited Edition Vinyl | EMI Music | 3798113 |

== Personnel ==
- Rod Coe – bass guitar except "Long Distance Driving", "Answer To Billy" and "Blue Hills (In The Distance)"
- Slim Dusty – acoustic guitar, vocals
- Michael Kerin – fiddle, acoustic guitar
- Anne Kirkpatrick – bass guitar on "Blue Hills (In The Distance)" and "Answer To Billy"
- Jeff Mercer – electric guitar, baritone guitar, resonator guitar, harmony vocals
- Lawrie Minson – harmonica
- Michel Rose – pedal steel guitar
- Rob Souther – drums
- Ian Simpson – banjo, acoustic guitar on "Answer To Billy"
- Michael Vidale – bass guitar on "Get Along"
- Tim Wedde – piano, accordion
- Steve Woods – upright bass on "Long Distance Driving"
- Keith Urban – electric guitar on “Get Along”
