= Australian country music =

Genre of popular music from Australia

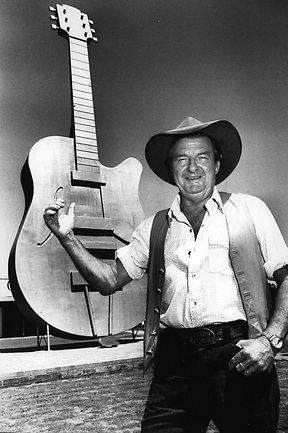
Slim Dusty, who was the best-selling domestic country artist

Australian country music is a part of the music of Australia. There is a broad range of styles, from bluegrass, to yodeling to folk to the more popular. The genre has been influenced by Celtic and Anglo-Saxon folk music, the Australian bush ballad tradition, as well as to a lesser extent by popular American country music. Themes include: outback life, the lives of stockmen, truckers and outlaws, songs of romance and of political protest; and songs about the "beauty and the terror" of the Australian bush.

Early pioneers of the genre included New Zealander Tex Morton, as well as local artists Smoky Dawson (touted as Australia's first singing cowboy), Buddy Williams, Slim Dusty, Johnny Ashcroft, Reg Lindsay and Jean Stafford (Early Hadley Recordings) who are all members of the Australian Roll of Renown.

== Australian country stars ==
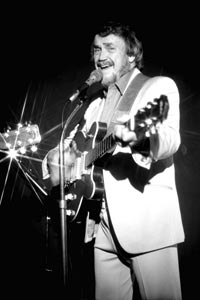
Early country star Johnny Ashcroft

Notable musicians include: Adam Brand, Adam Harvey, Amber Lawrence, Caitlyn Shadbolt, Christie Lamb, Jasmine Rae, Troy Cassar-Daley, Davidson Brothers, Slim Dusty, Steve Forde, Joy McKean (Australia’s Grand Lady Of Country Music), Jean Stafford (Australia’s Queen Of Country Music), Olivia Newton-John, Lionel Long, John Williamson, Chad Morgan, Keith Urban, O'Shea, Lee Kernaghan, Melinda Schneider, Kasey Chambers and Beccy Cole. Others influenced by the genre include Paul Kelly and Tex Perkins. Popular songs include When the Rain Tumbles Down in July (1946), Waltzing Matilda (1895), Pub With No Beer (1957), Lights on the Hill (1973), I Honestly Love You (1974), True Blue (1981), Boys From the Bush (1992), and Not Pretty Enough (2002).

== Overview ==
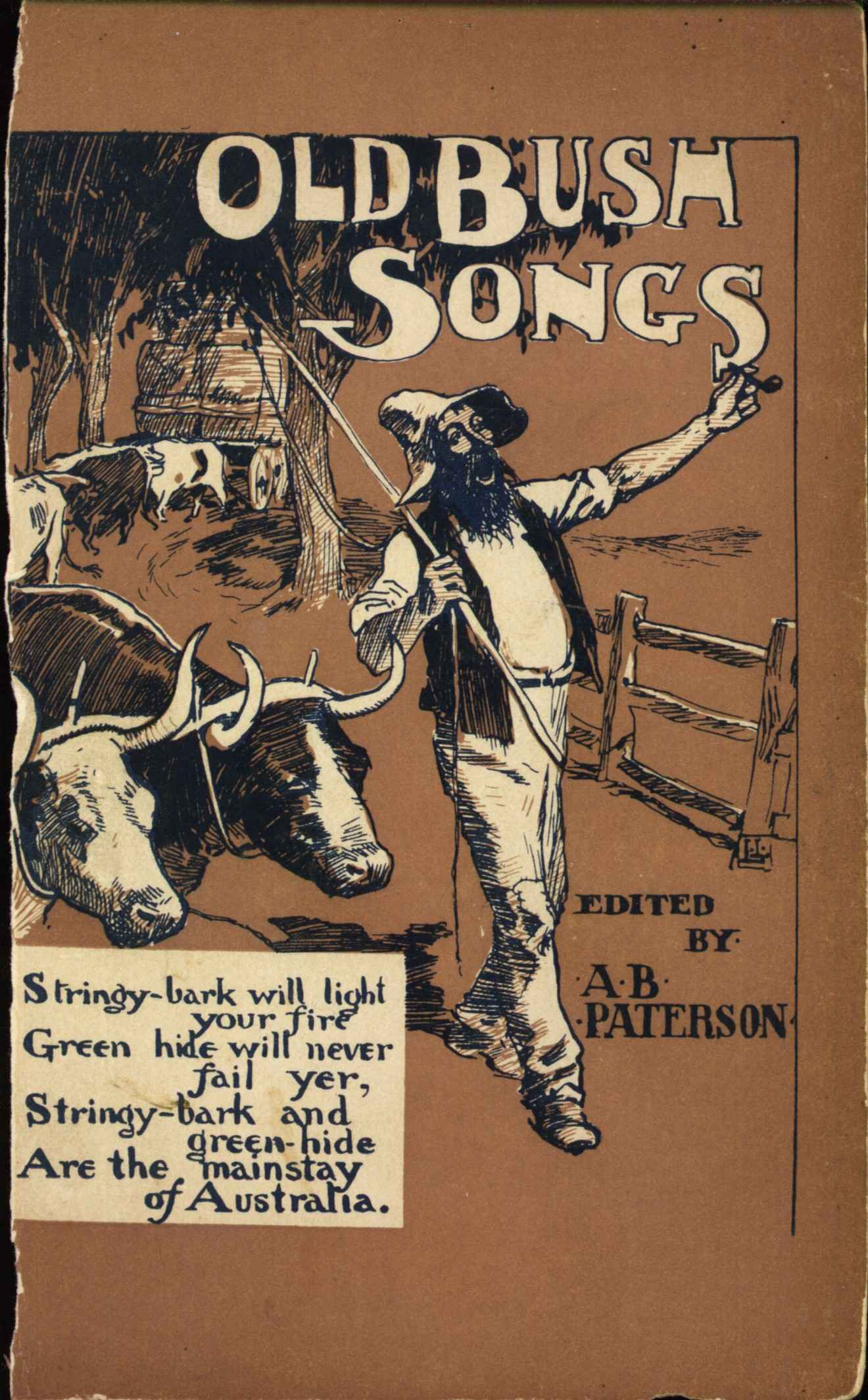
A 1905 collection of old bush songs compiled by Banjo Paterson. Australian country music is heavily influenced by American country music, but grew also out of an Australian tradition of Bush ballads and poetry.

Australia has a long tradition of country music, which has developed a style quite distinct from its US counterpart, influenced by English, Irish and Scottish folk ballads and by the traditions of Australian bush balladeers like Henry Lawson and Banjo Paterson. Country instruments, including the guitar, banjo, fiddle and harmonica create the distinctive sound of country music in Australia and accompany songs with strong storyline and memorable chorus and lyrics.

The style of Australian country music evolved under the influence of rock and roll forms. While some subject matter may be constant, musical styles differ between traditional and contemporary bush ballads. Exemplars of the traditional bush ballad style include Slim Dusty's "When the Rain Tumbles Down in July" or "Leave Him in the Long Yard" which have strong narrative in verses plus choruses set to a pick n' strum beat. Contemporary bush ballads may employ finger picking and strumming rock styles as in Lee Kernaghan's later version of "Leave Him in the Long Yard", or in Keith Urban reworking of the Slim Dusty/Joy McKean classic "Lights on the Hill".

=== Early bush music ===
The distinctive themes and origins of Australia's bush music can be traced to the songs sung by the convicts who were sent to Australia during the early period of the British colonisation, beginning in 1788. Early Australian ballads sing of the harsh ways of life of the epoch and of such people and events as bushrangers, swagmen, drovers, stockmen and shearers. Convict and bushranger verses often railed against government tyranny. Classic bush songs on such themes include: "The Wild Colonial Boy", "Click Go the Shears", "The Eumeralla Shore", "The Drover's Dream", "The Queensland Drover", "The Dying Stockman" and "Moreton Bay".

Later themes which endure to the present include the experiences of war, of droughts and flooding rains, of Aboriginal identity and of the railways and trucking routes which link Australia's vast distances. Isolation and loneliness of life in the Australian bush has been another theme. For much of its history, Australia's bush music belonged to an oral and folkloric tradition, and was only later published in print in volumes such as Banjo Paterson's Old Bush Songs, in the 1890s.

"Waltzing Matilda", often regarded as Australia's unofficial national anthem, is a quintessential early Australian country song, influenced more by Celtic folk ballads than by US country and western music. The lyrics were composed by the poet Banjo Paterson in 1895. This strain of Australian country music, with lyrics focusing on strictly Australian subjects, is generally known as "bush music" or "bush band music".

Country and folk artists such as Gary Shearston, Lionel Long, Margaret Roadknight, Tex Morton, Slim Dusty, Rolf Harris, The Bushwackers, John Williamson, and John Schumann of the band Redgum have continued to record and popularise the old bush ballads of Australia through the 20th and into the 21st century – and contemporary artists including Pat Drummond, Sara Storer and Lee Kernaghan draw heavily on this heritage.

=== Development of modern country ===
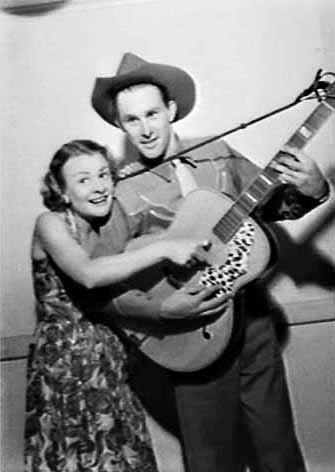
Country singer Reg Lindsay and Joan Clarke on the Hour of Song radio program, 2UW Radio Theatre, Sydney in 1954

Pioneers of a more Americanised popular country music in Australia included Tex Morton (known as The Father of Australian Country Music) in the 1930s and other early stars like Buddy Williams, Shirley Thoms and Smoky Dawson. In 1932, Tex Morton arrived from New Zealand, aged 16, and humped his swag around outback stations where he began to earn a name as a performer. In 1936 he cut his first commercial records in Australia. He went on to establish a distinctly Australian bush ballad style, shifting from American songs to songs about Australia. He attained national popularity in the 1930s and formed a traveling "Rodeo and Wildwest Show" in the 1940s. In 1949 he travelled to North America and Europe enjoying great success as a stage hypnotist, working in film and with artists such as Hank Williams. He returned to Australia in the early 1960s, by which time a generation of performers had carved a place for the Australian themed country music he pioneered.

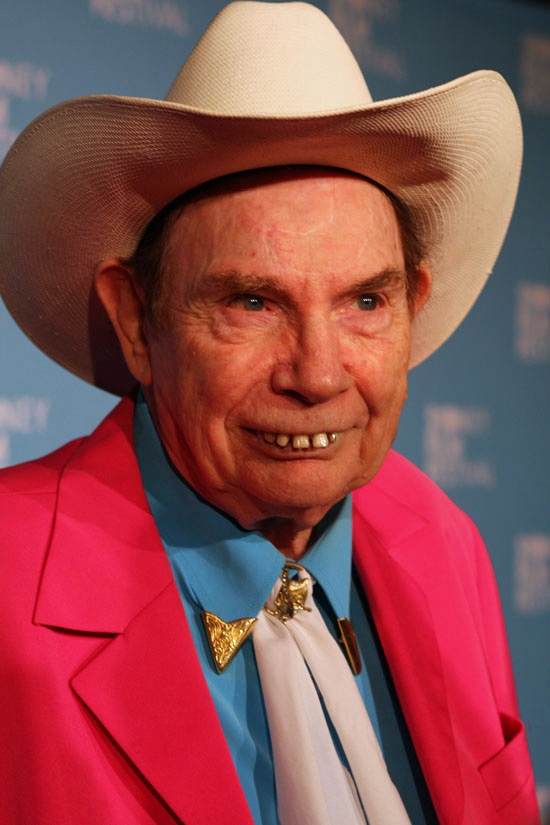
Chad Morgan, the "clown prince" of Australian country music. Morgan performed from the 1950s until 2024 before his death on 1 January 2025. His works are peppered with colourful Australian vernacular.

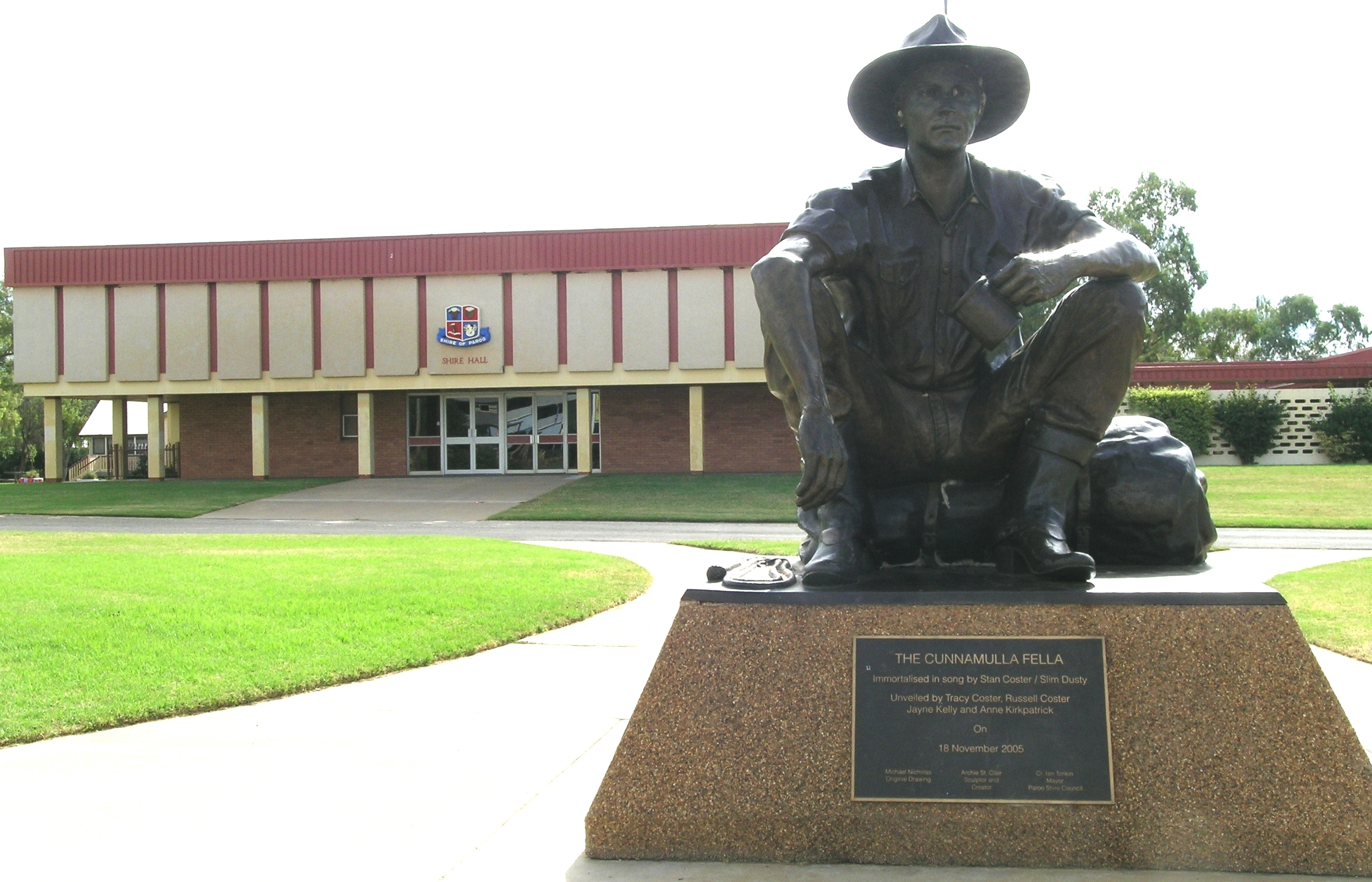
Statue of "The Cunnamulla Fella" erected as a tribute to songwriter Stan Coster and singer Slim Dusty

Smoky Dawson cut his first recording in 1941: "I'm a Happy Go Lucky Cowhand". In 1952, Dawson began a radio show, and went on to national stardom as a yodelling, whip cracking, knife throwing, singing cowboy of radio, TV and film.

Known as "Canada's Yodelling Cowboy", Donn Reynolds (1921–1997) began a 40-year international career upon cutting several popular sides in 1947 on the Regal Zonophone label including "Old Bush Shanty of Mine" and "Stockman's Lullaby". He toured with Willard (Bill) Ferrier's Famous Hillbillies in what was Sydney's first all-country format variety shows and became the voice of Australia's iconic Peters Ice Cream as the "Peter's Singing Cowboy". Reynolds achieved notoriety through song and screen performances worldwide, and later established 2 world records for yodeling.

Slim Dusty (1927–2003) was known as the "King of Australian Country Music", and helped to popularise the Australian bush ballad. His successful career spanned almost six decades and his 1957 hit "A Pub With No Beer" was the biggest-selling record by an Australian to that time, the first Australian single to go gold, and the first and only 78 rpm record to be awarded a gold disc. Dusty remains Australia's most successful and prolific performer, and won more Gold and Platinum albums than any other Australian artist. Dusty recorded and released his one-hundredth album in the year 2000 and was given the honour of singing Waltzing Matilda in the closing ceremony of the Sydney 2000 Olympic Games. Dusty was accorded a state funeral upon his death and with over 7 million Australian record sales he remains Australia's most successful domestic music artist.

Slim Dusty's wife Joy McKean penned several of his most popular songs including "Indian Pacific", "The Biggest Disappointment" and "Lights on the Hill". Their daughter Anne Kirkpatrick is also a successful singer-songwriter. The family began annual round Australia tours in 1964 – encompassing a 30,000-mile, 10-month journey which was the subject of a feature film, The Slim Dusty Movie in 1984.

Although himself an accomplished writer of songs, Dusty had a number of other songwriters including Mack Cormack, Gordon Parsons, Stan Coster and Kelly Dixon who were typically short on formal education but big on personal experience of the Australian bush. Coster wrote popular Dusty bush ballads including "Cunnamulla Fella" and "Three Rivers Hotel" based on his own experience of working as a sheep hand and railway construction worker. Drawing on his travels and such writers over a span of decades, Dusty almost inadvertently chronicled the story of a rapidly changing post-war Australian nation. Nevertheless, the arrival of rock and roll music saw major metropolitan music radio stations abandon support for country artists like Dusty and despite record sales in the multi millions, he and other successful Australian country artists were rarely heard on air outside regional centres in Australia until the new cross-over pop-country styles of the 1990s began to be heard again on city airwaves.

In 1951, country singer-songwriter Reg Lindsay began broadcasting on Sydney radio and remained on air for 12 years. In 1964 he took over Channel 9's The Country & Western Hour, which was networked around Australia and ran for seven and a half years. Soon after the show was replaced with Reg Lindsay's Country Homestead from Brisbane. The show gave hundreds of young artists a boost and helped to boost the Australian country music industry.

Another enduring talent of Australian country music has been Chad Morgan, who began recording in the 1950s and is known for his vaudeville style of comic Australian country and western songs, his prominent teeth and goofy stage persona. In reference to his first recording he is known as The Sheik of Scrubby Creek. Johnny Ashcroft had an early country-rock chart success in Australia and New Zealand while Frank Ifield achieved considerable success in the early 1960s, especially in the UK Singles Charts. Reg Lindsay was one of the first Australians to perform at Nashville's Grand Ole Opry in 1974. His international hit Armstrong, a tribute to the historic 1969 Moon landing by American astronaut Neil Armstrong is now included in a time capsule at the Johnson Space Center in Houston, Texas.

Ted Egan began recording in 1969 and has released 28 albums, mostly themed around outback life, history and Aboriginal affairs. Eric Bogle's 1972 folk lament to the Gallipoli campaign "And The Band Played Waltzing Matilda" recalled the Celtic origins of Australian folk-country.

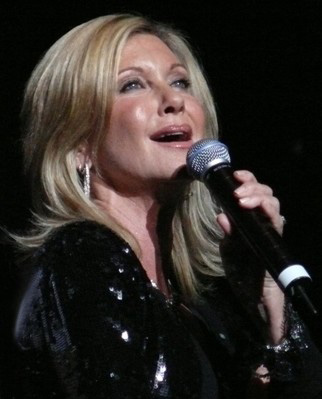
Olivia Newton-John

Singer-songwriter John Williamson began to build his reputation as an iconic Australian entertainer with his 1970 performance of his first song "Old Man Emu" on New Faces (influenced by novelty works of Rolf Harris such as "Tie Me Kangaroo Down, Sport"). It was the first of many popular songs employing Australian slang. In 1982 he released "True Blue" and subsequent works including Mallee Boy, the lyrical "Galleries of Pink Galahs" and reworkings of Australian bush ballads and folk songs earned him a permanent position as leading exponent of Australian country and folk music.

In 1970, Tamworth's Radio 2TM organised the landmark Bicentennial Concert to mark the 200th anniversary of the voyage of Captain James Cook along the coast of Eastern Australia. The pioneers of Australian country music Slim Dusty, Joy McKean, Barry Thornton, "Smiling" Billy Blinkhorn, Smoky Dawson, Shirley Thoms and Buddy Bishop all featured in the concert which contributed to a revival of interest in Australian country music which had struggled for airplay since the arrival of rock and roll in Australia. The Tamworth Country Music Festival began in 1973 and now attracts up to a 100,000 visitors annually.

In 1974, popular cross-over artist Olivia Newton-John received the Country Music Association's Top Female Vocalist award in the US, despite protest from American country purists. Her popular hits have included "I Honestly Love You" and "Tenterfield Saddler" by Australian singer-songwriter Peter Allen as well as country classics such as "Banks of the Ohio" and "Take Me Home, Country Roads".

Brian Young OAM (1935 – 15 May 2016), also known as the Singing Rough Rider, the Singing Bushman, and the Voice Of The Outback, was born in Ayr, Queensland. His first recording was an EP in 1962 and he later released several albums on Opal Records, the last in 2007. His touring Brian Young Show, which toured to some of the most remote places in Australia by chartered aeroplane, brought major country music stars such as Jimmy Little, Col Hardy, Auriel Andrew, Roger Knox, Troy Cassar-Daley, and Beccy Cole to fans around the nation. He was named Songmaker of the Year by the Tamworth Songwriters Association (TSA), and in 2000. won their Tex Morton Award and the Outback Trailblazer Award. He was a winner of a Golden Guitar Award Winner, and in 1999 was inducted into the Australian Country Music Roll of Renown at the Tamworth Country Music Festival. In 2001, he was honoured with an Order of Australia Medal.

=== Aboriginal country ===
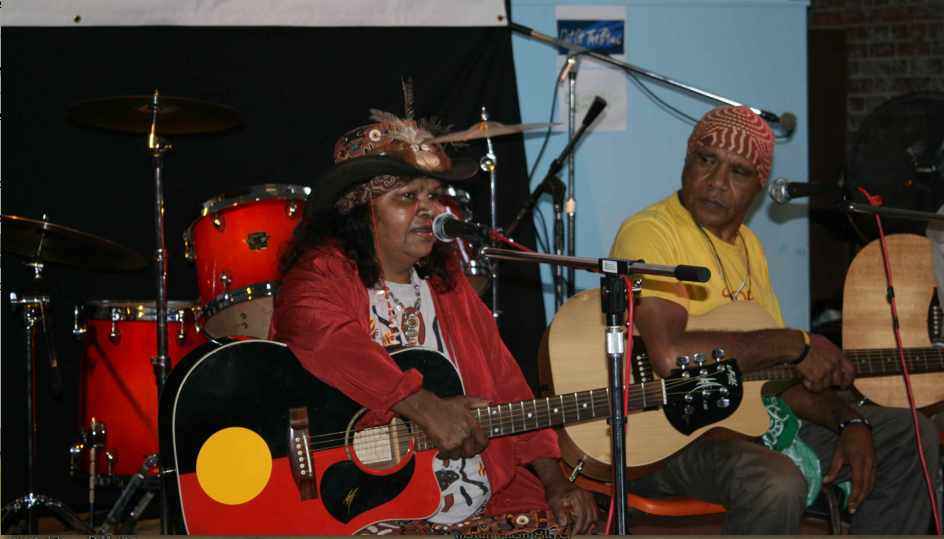
Archie Roach (right) with Ruby Hunter at the 2009 Tamworth Country Music Festival

Country music has been particularly popular among the Aboriginal Australian and Torres Strait Islander peoples, creating a sub-genre often termed Aboriginal country music.

Jimmy Little was a pioneer, Georgia Lee was of the same era (1940s–50s). Dougie Young, Lionel Rose, and Harry and Wilga Williams and their band the Country Outcasts were very popular during the 1960s and 1970s.

Gus Williams, Auriel Andrew, and Isaac Yamma were active from the 1970s, and the 1980s brought Roger Knox ("godfather of Koori music"), Warren H. Williams, Kev Carmody, Archie Roach, Ruby Hunter, Tiddas, and the Warumpi Band, among many others. Troy Cassar-Daley is among Australia's successful contemporary Indigenous performers. Carmody and Roach have employed a combination of folk-rock and country music to sing about Aboriginal rights issues.

The book, documentary film, and soundtrack Buried Country (2000) showcase significant Indigenous musicians from the 1940s to the 1990s.

=== Contemporary ===
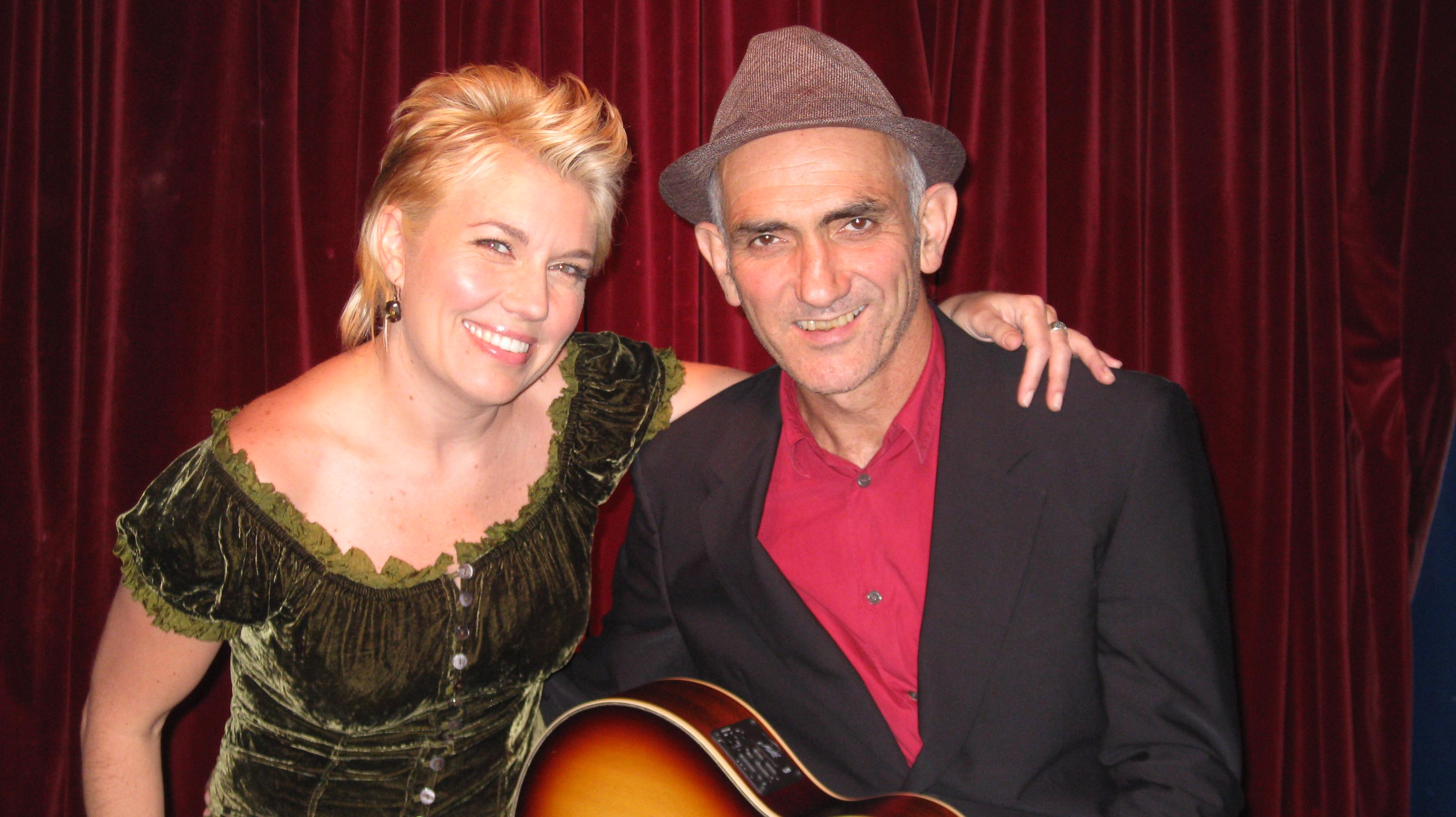
Country singer Melinda Schneider with folk-rocker Paul Kelly

In 1992, the Country Music Association of Australia was launched in Tamworth, New South Wales to encourage, develop and promote Australian country music. Slim Dusty was its first chairman, John Williamson its vice chairman, Joy McKean was treasurer, Max Ellis secretary and Phil Matthews public officer. After negotiations, Tamworth's Radio 2TM agreed to hand over responsibility for the Golden Guitar Awards to the new body.

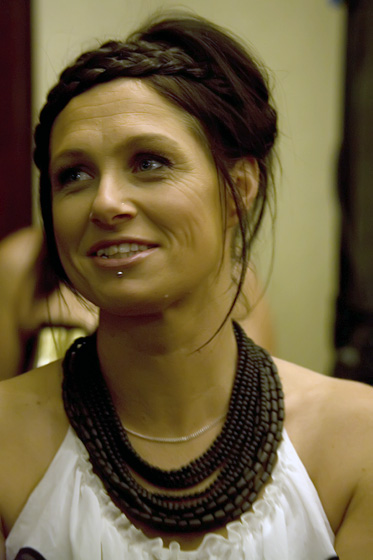
Kasey Chambers

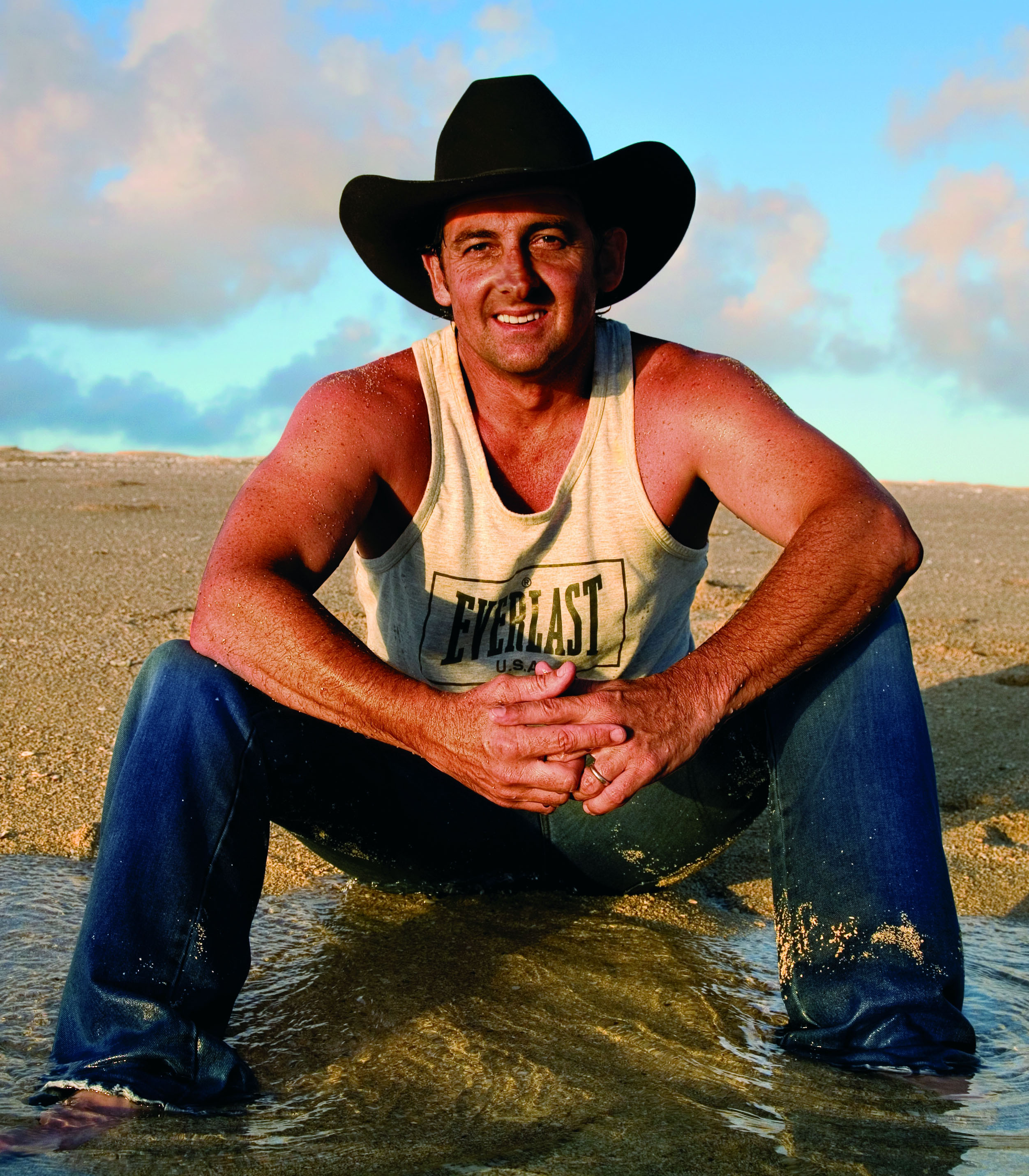
Lee Kernaghan

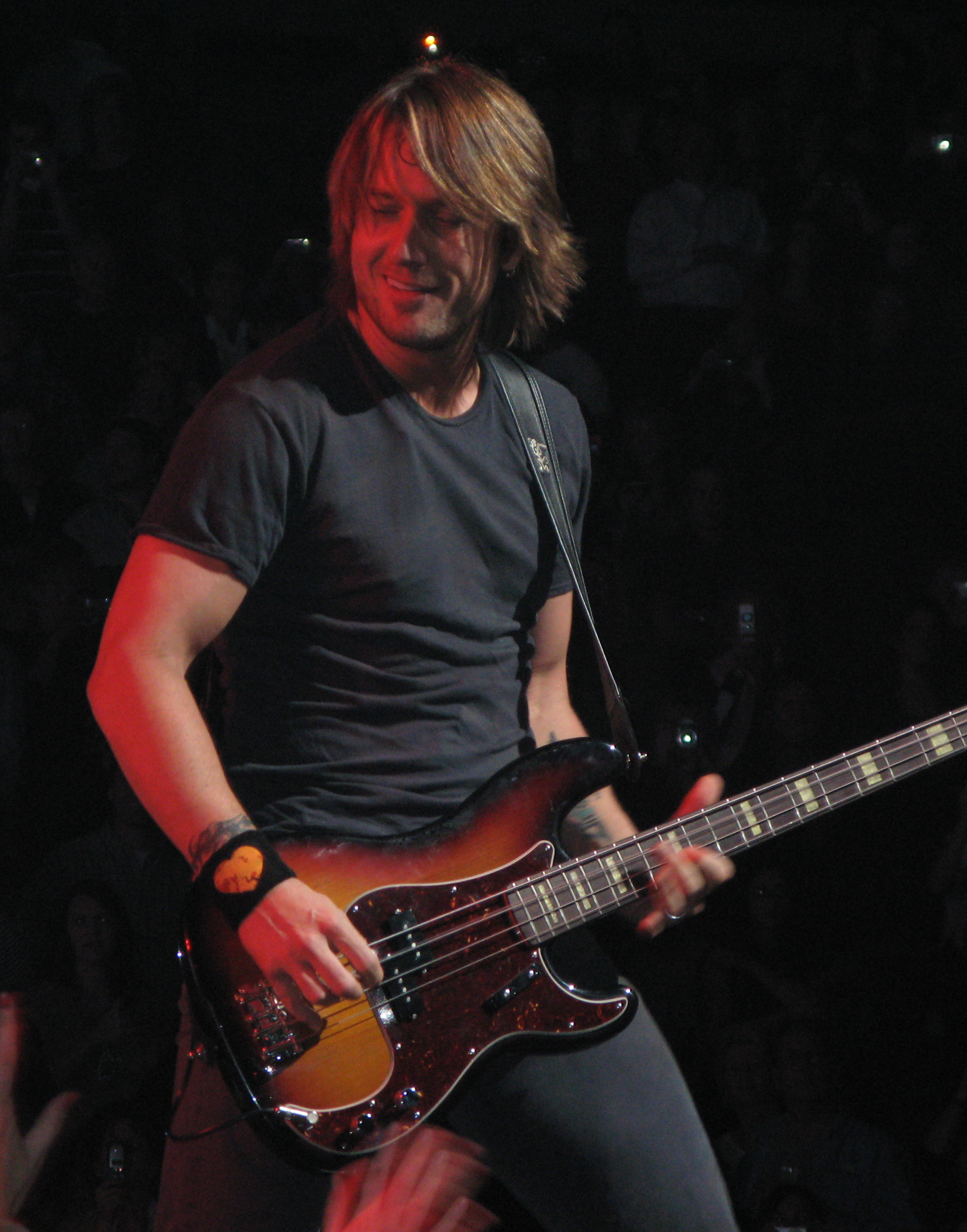
Keith Urban

By the 1990s, Country music had attained cross-over success in the pop charts with artists like James Blundell, James Reyne singing "Way Out West", and country star Kasey Chambers winning the ARIA Award for Best Female Artist in 2000, 2002 and 2003 and becoming the youngest artist to ever be inducted into the ARIA Hall of Fame. The daughter of steel guitarist Bill Chambers, Kasey Chambers' hits include "Not Pretty Enough" (2002), "True Colours" (2003) and "Pony" (2004), which were all top ten hits in the ARIA Charts.

The cross-over influence of Australian country is also evident in the music of successful contemporary bands The Waifs and The John Butler Trio. Singer-songwriter Paul Kelly whose music style straddles folk, rock, and country is often described as the "poet laureate" of Australian music.

Eclectic rocker Nick Cave has been heavily influenced by the US country music artist Johnny Cash. Cave has recorded a number of country covers including several on his 1986 album Kicking Against the Pricks, which has such well-known country classics as "By the Time I Get to Phoenix", "Long Black Veil" and "The Singer" (a.k.a. "The Folksinger"). In 2000, Cash, covered Cave's "The Mercy Seat" on the album American III: Solitary Man. Subsequently, Cave cut a duet with Cash on a version of Hank Williams' "I'm So Lonesome I Could Cry" for Cash's American IV: The Man Comes Around album (2002).

Popular and emerging contemporary performers of Australian country include: Lee Kernaghan (whose hits include the contemporary country classic "Boys From the Bush") and sister Tania Kernaghan, Melinda Schneider, Gina Jeffreys, Beccy Cole, Felicity Urquhart, Shannon Noll, Tracy Coster, Sara Storer, and brother Doug Storer.

Sara Storer's award-winning second album Beautiful Circle prompted Melbourne's The Age newspaper to report that "As we lament the death of Slim Dusty, here is evidence that authentic, yet contemporary Australian bush country has not died with his passing". Her Australian accent, song subject matter and collaborations with established balladeers John Williamson and Paul Kelly link her to the oldest traditions of Australian country music.

In the United States, Australian country music stars including Sherrié Austin and Keith Urban have attained great success. In 1991, Urban released a self-titled debut album and charted four singles in Australia before moving to the United States in 1992 going on to chart more than fifteen singles on the US country charts, including ten number ones. Urban has proven extremely successful internationally and has won the Country Music Association Award for Male Vocalist of the Year three times and their top Entertainer of the Year honour twice.

== Awards and festivals ==
The Tamworth Country Music Festival is an annual country music festival held in Tamworth, New South Wales. the country music capital of Australia. It celebrates the culture and heritage of Australian country music. During the festival the Country Music Association of Australia holds the Country Music Awards of Australia ceremony awarding the Golden Guitar trophies and the Tamworth Songwriters Association hosts the annual Tamworth Songwriters Association Songwriting Awards. Another important Country festival, the Gympie Muster began in near Gympie, Queensland in 1982. The non-profit community-based festival raises funds for charity and attracts around 25,000 fans to listen to stars and new talents alike. As well as mainstream Australian country the event showcases the breadth of contemporary Australian country: from folk and bush poetry, to alternative country.

Indigenous country music is in evidence at the Deadly Awards, a celebration of Indigenous musicians and their music.

The Mildura Country Music Festival celebrates the Australian Independent Country Music Awards every October.

Other significant country music festivals include the Whittlesea Country Music Festival held north of Melbourne in February, Boyup Brook Country Music Festival held in Western Australian in February, Bamera Country Music Festival held in South Australia in June, the National Country Muster held in Gympie during August and the Canberra Country Music Festival held in the national capital during November. Some festivals are quite unique in their location: the Groundwater Country Music Festival is held beachside in Broadbeach, on the beautiful Gold Coast annually on the last weekend in July. Grabine State Park in New South Wales promotes Australian country music through the Grabine Music Muster Festival; Marilyns Country Music Festival is a unique event held in South Australia's Smoky Bay annually in September and is the only music festival in the world using an oyster barge as a stage.

Along with the festivals above, there are also event that include country music such as Musters, Field Days and rural shows.

== Media ==
Australian country music is promoted heavily through dedicated media outlets in Australia including:

=== Television ===
- CMT (Country Music Television), the only country music video channel in Australia, which replaced Country Music Channel in 2020

=== Radio ===
- ABC Country
- Triple M Country Digital
- KIX Country
- Today's Country 94.1 (NSW Central Coast)
- 98.9 FM (Brisbane), aka Triple A Murri Country
- Australian Country Radio (digital only)

Planet Country with Big Stu & MJ was a Sydney-based program, defunct since 2020; past programs are available on podcast services.)

=== Print ===
- Country Update (magazine)
- Country Capital News (magazine)
