= Looking Forward Looking Back =

Studio album by Slim Dusty
- Released: July 2000
- Recorded: 2000
- Studios: Columbia Lane Studios, Electric Avenue Studios, Studios 301, The Music Cellar
- Genre: Country
- Length: 44:45
- Label: EMI
- Producers: Rod Coe, Phil Punch

Slim Dusty chronology
Ninety Nine (1999)	Looking Forward Looking Back (2000)	The Man Who Is Australia (2000)

Looking Forward Looking Back is the 56th studio album by Australian country music singer-songwriter Slim Dusty. This album was Slim Dusty's 100th album release.

Looking Forward Looking Back was celebrated with a special Network 9 This Is Your Life event presentation by Mike Munro.

At the ARIA Music Awards of 2001, the album won Best Country Album. The album was also nominated for Highest Selling Album.

== Reception ==
Professional ratings
Review scores
Source	Rating
AllMusic	3/5 stars

== Track listing ==
No.	Title	Writer(s)	Length
1.	"Looking Forward Looking Back"	Don Walker	3:12
2.	"Never Was at All"	Norma O'Hara Murphy	3:15
3.	"There's a Rainbow Over the Rock"	Kevin Bloody Wilson	2:57
4.	"Matilda No More" (featuring Kasey Chambers)	Eric Bogle	3:41
5.	"The Bloke Who Serves the Beer"	Peter Denahy	3:00
6.	"Paddy William"	O'Hara Murphy	4:32
7.	"Clean Up Our Own Backyard"	Joy McKean	2:24
8.	"Old Time Country Songs"	Slim Dusty	3:02
9.	"A Bad Day's Fishing"	Kevin Bloody Wilson	2:36
10.	"Port Augusta"	Steve Grace	3:20
11.	"Good Heavens Above"	Barry Skipsey	2:32
12.	"Hooks & Ride"	John Quinn, Tom Oliver	2:17
13.	"Keela Valley Coals"	A.E. Brooks, Dusty	3:17
14.	"Memories and Dreams"	Jeff Burton, Michael Fix	3:09
15.	"Looking Forward Looking Back" (reprise)	Walker	1:31

== Personnel ==
- Slim Dusty – vocals

The Travelling Country Band

- Robbie Souter – drums
- Rod Coe – bass
- Jeff Mercer – acoustic guitar, electric guitar, baritone guitar, dobro, harmony vocals
- Mike Kerin – fiddle, acoustic guitar on "Never Was At All", vocals on "Bad Days Fishing"

Additional musicians

- Tim Wedde – piano, organ, accordion
- Michel Rose – pedal steel guitar on "Memories and Dreams" and "Good Heavens Above"
- Lawrie Minson – harmonica on "Bad Days Fishing" and "Clean Up Our Own Backyard"
- Colin Watson – electric guitar on "Gods Heavens Above", string arrangement
- Jeff McCormack – bass on "Port Augusta", "Rainbow Over The Rock" and "Memories and Dreams"
- Peter Denahy – fiddle on "The Bloke Who Serves The Beer"
- Matt Fell – keyboard, mellotron, bass, electric guitar, mandolin, percussion on "Matilda No More"
- Mark Punch – percussion on "Looking Forward Looking Back" and "Rainbow Over The Rock"
- Phil Hartl – string leader
- Kasey Chambers – guest vocals on "Matilda No More"

== Charts ==
Looking Forward Looking Back debuted at number 5 in the Australian album charts and peaked at number 3 in September 2000.

=== Weekly charts ===
Chart (2000)	Peak position
Australian Albums (ARIA)	3

=== Year-end charts ===
Chart (2000)	Position
Australian Albums (ARIA)	28
Australian Country Albums (ARIA)	1
Australian Artist Albums (ARIA)	9
Chart (2001)	Position
Australian Country Albums (ARIA)	8

== Certifications ==
Region	Certification	Certified units/sales
Australia (ARIA)	2× Platinum	140,000^{^}
^{^} Shipments figures based on certification alone.

== Release history ==
Region	Date	Format	Edition(s)	Label	Catalogue
Australia	12 July 2000	CD; Cassette	Standard	Slim Dusty Enterprises, EMI Music	5271602
Australia	10 June 2016	LP	Vinyl	EMI Music	3794225
