= Travellin' Still...Always Will =

Studio album by Slim Dusty & Anne Kirkpatrick
- Released: March 2002
- Venue: Columbia Lane Studios
- Genre: Country
- Label: EMI Music

Slim Dusty albums chronology
The Men from Nulla Nulla (2001)	Travellin' Still...Always Will (2002)	Columbia Lane – the Last Sessions (2004)

Travellin' Still...Always Will is a studio album released by Australian country music singer Slim Dusty and his daughter Anne Kirkpatrick. The album was Slim’s penultimate recording before his death. It was released in March 2002, peaked at number 35 on the ARIA Charts and was certified gold.

== Track listing ==
No.	Title	Length
1.	"End of the Bitumen" (performed by Slim Dusty)	4:11
2.	"Travellin' Still – Always Will" (performed by Anne Kirkpatrick)	3:32
3.	"Tracks I Left Behind" (performed by Slim Dusty)	2:31
4.	"Man on the Side of the Road" (performed by Slim Dusty and Anne Kirkpatrick)	2:54
5.	"Just an Old Cattle Dog" (performed by Slim Dusty)	3:56
6.	"Belt and Buckled" (performed by Slim Dusty and Anne Kirkpatrick)	3:06
7.	"Bonner (The Quiet Achiever)" (performed by Slim Dusty)	3:02
8.	"You and My Old Guitar" (performed by Slim Dusty and Anne Kirkpatrick)	2:55
9.	"I Wonder If the Creeks are Flowing Still" (performed by Anne Kirkpatrick)	3:16
10.	"Claypan Boogie" (performed by Slim Dusty)	3:36
11.	"Sundown" (performed by Anne Kirkpatrick)	3:59
12.	"Taking on What's Next!" (performed by Slim Dusty)	3:19
13.	"The Men Who Try and Try" (performed by Slim Dusty)	1:41

== Charts ==
=== Weekly charts ===
Chart (2002)	Peak position
Australian Albums (ARIA)	35

=== Year-end charts ===
Chart (2002)	Position
Australian Country Albums (ARIA)	14

== Certifications ==
Region	Certification	Certified units/sales
Australia (ARIA)	Gold	35,000^{^}
^{^} Shipments figures based on certification alone.

== Release history ==
Region	Date	Format	Edition(s)	Label	Catalogue
Australia	March 2002	CD; Cassette	Standard	Slim Dusty Enterprises, EMI Music	724353803421
