= Anne Kirkpatrick =

Australian country music singer (born 1952)

- Born: 4 July 1952 (age 73); Granville, New South Wales, Australia
- Genres: Country
- Occupation(s): Singer, songwriter
- Labels: EMI, Columbia
- Spouse: John Allen

Anne Kirkpatrick (born 4 July 1952) is an Australian country music singer. She is the daughter of country singers Slim Dusty and Joy McKean.

== Biography ==
She also has a brother, David Kirkpatrick, who is an accomplished singer-songwriter. The year 1964 saw the establishment of the annual Slim Dusty Australia-round tour, a 48,280 kilometres (30,000 mi) journey that went on for ten months. This regular event was the subject of a feature film, The Slim Dusty Movie, in 1984, which includes several performances featuring Anne Kirkpatrick. Kirkpatrick also features in the 2020 Australian documentary Slim and I.

Kirkpatrick has won Golden Guitar Awards at the Tamworth Country Music Festival in 1979, 1991, and twice in 1992. She also won an ARIA Award for Best Australian Country Record in 1992. and appeared on the 1990 compilation album Breaking Ground - New Directions in Country Music which was nominated for the 1991 ARIA Award for Best Country Album.

In 2010, Kirkpatrick was inducted into the Australian Roll of Renown.

== Albums ==
=== Studio albums ===
| Title | Album details | Chart positions | Certifications (sales thresholds) |
| Title | Album details | AUS | Certifications (sales thresholds) |
|---|---|---|---|
| Down Home | Released: 1974; Label: Columbia Records (SCXO-8019) | - | |
| Let the Songs Keep Flowing Strong and Naturally | Released: 1976; Label: EMI Music (EMC.2554) | - | |
| Shoot the Moon | Released: July 1978; Label: EMI Music (EMC.2655) | 60 | |
| Merry-Go-Round of Life | Released: 1982; Label: Nulla Records (NUL.102) | - | |
| Come Back Again | Released: 1987; Label: EMI Music (EMX 430049) | - | |
| Two Singers One Song (with Slim Dusty) | Released: 1989; Label: EMI Music/Columbia (SCXO 793190) | - | |
| Out of the Blue | Released: 1991; Label: ABC Records/Phonogram (846595-2) | - | |
| Game of Love | Released: 1993; Label: ABC Records/EMI Music (4796012) | - | |
| Cry Like a Man | Released: 1997; Label: ABC Records/EMI Music (8214822) | - | |
| Travellin' Still...Always Will (with Slim Dusty) | Released: March 2002; Label: EMI (724353803421) | 37 | ARIA: Gold |
| Showmans Daughter | Released: May 2006; Label: Compass Brothers (022CDCB) | - | |

=== Live albums ===
| Title | Album details |
|---|---|
| 21st Anniversary Concert | Released: 1995; Label: EMI Music/ ABC Country (4798102) |

=== Compilation albums ===
| Title | Album details |
|---|---|
| Annie's Songs | Released: 1980; Label: EMI Music (EMY-503) |
| The Best of Anne Kirkpatrick | Released: 1991; Label: Axis Music (701655-2) |
| Anthology: The Best of Anne Kirkpatrick | Released: 2 September 2011; Label: UMA (9055632) |
| The Early Years 1974-1987 | Released: 6 February 2015; Label: UMA (4704214); 5-CD Set |

==== Other singles ====
List of singles as featured artist, with selected chart positions
| Title | Year | Peak chart positions |
| Title | Year | AUS |
|---|---|---|
| "The Garden" (as Australia Too) | 1985 | 38 |

== Awards ==
=== ARIA Awards ===
Kirkpatrick has been nominated for five ARIA Music Awards

| Year | Nominee / work | Award | Result |
|---|---|---|---|
| 1990 | Two Singers One Song (with Slim Dusty) | Best Country Album | Nominated |
| 1992 | Out of the Blue | Best Country Album | Won |
| 1994 | Game of Love | Best Female Artist | Nominated |
| 1994 | Game of Love | Best Country Album | Nominated |
| 2006 | Showman's Daughter | Best Country Album | Nominated |

=== Country Music Awards (CMAA) ===
Kirkpatrick has won six Golden guitar awards at the Tamworth Country Music Awards of Australia

| Year | Nominee / work | Award | Result |
|---|---|---|---|
| 1979 | "Grievous Angel" | Female Vocalist of the Year | Won |
| 1991 | Two Singers One Song (with Slim Dusty) | Top Selling Album | Won |
| 1992 | Out of the Blue | Album of the Year | Won |
| 1992 | "I Guess We've Been Together Too Long" | Female Vocalist of the Year | Won |
| 2005 | "Back to the Saltbush Plains" (with Tracy Coster) | Vocal Collaboration of the Year | Won |
| 2007 | "Peppimenarti Cradle" | Bush Ballad of the Year | Won |

=== Australian Roll of Renown ===
The Australian Roll of Renown honours Australian and New Zealander musicians who have shaped the music industry by making a significant and lasting contribution to Country Music. It was inaugurated in 1976 and the inductee is announced at the Country Music Awards of Australia in Tamworth in January.

| Year | Nominee / work | Award | Result |
|---|---|---|---|
| 2010 | Anne Kirkpatrick | Australian Roll of Renown | inductee |

=== Mo Awards ===
The Australian Entertainment Mo Awards (commonly known informally as the Mo Awards), were annual Australian entertainment industry awards. They recognise achievements in live entertainment in Australia from 1975 to 2016. Anne Kirkpatrick won two awards in that time.

| Year | Nominee / work | Award | Result (wins only) |
|---|---|---|---|
| 1991 | Anne Kirkpatrick | Country Female Entertainer of the Year | Won |
| 1992 | Anne Kirkpatrick | Country Female Entertainer of the Year | Won |
