= Gordon Parsons (singer-songwriter) =

Australian singer-songwriter (1926–1990)

- Born: 24 December 1926; Paddington, Sydney, Australia
- Died: 17 August 1990 (aged 63)
- Genres: Country
- Occupations: Singer-songwriter, musician
- Instruments: Vocals, guitar
- Years active: 1946–1980s
- Labels: Regal Zonophone, EMI

Gordon Parsons was an Australian country music singer-songwriter, best known as the composer of Slim Dusty's 1957 hit song "A Pub With No Beer". In 1982, Parsons was inducted into the Australian Roll of Renown.

== Early life and career ==
He was born in Paddington, an Eastern suburb of Sydney in 1926, and moved with his parents to Cooks Creek near Bellingen, New South Wales, in 1929. At age 14, he left his parents' farm and subsequently worked as a sleeper-cutter. Around this time, he entered a well-known radio talent quest, "Terry Dear’s Australian Amateur Hour", and was awarded second prize. Regal Zonophone Records, as a result of hearing him on "Amateur Hour", recorded six songs with him in 1947.

As a performer, he then toured widely in rural Australia with a number of travelling shows, including Goldwyn Brothers Circus. While touring he met and married his first wife, Zelda, of the Ashton's Circus family. They had a daughter (Gail) in 1949, but the marriage soon ended.

He continued to tour regularly with major country acts such as Slim Dusty, Chad Morgan, and Tex Morton, and between tours "went bush" to write more songs, fish, and do menial farm work. He continued to record for Regal Zonophone, and later for various other labels, including Mystery (1950s), Hadley (1960s), CM Records (1970s), and Columbia and Selection (1980s).

== "The Pub With No Beer" ==
In 1956, someone handed Parsons a scrap of paper with the words of a poem, "A Pub Without Beer" (written in 1943 by Queensland farmer Dan Sheahan, on finding that his local pub, the Day Dawn Hotel in Ingham, Queensland, had been drunk dry by US servicemen stationed in the area), and suggested that it might be a basis for a song. Parsons wrote "A Pub With No Beer", fleshing the poem out with word-portraits of patrons of his own local pub, the Cosmopolitan Hotel at the tiny settlement of Taylors Arm, about 25 km inland from Macksville, New South Wales. Slim Dusty heard the song while touring with Parsons, and he asked if he could record it as a novelty filler for his upcoming 1957 recording date, as he was one song short of the required four. Dusty's recording was released as the B-side of his 78 rpm release, "Saddle Boy", and much to Slim's surprise, the B-side was soon getting huge air-play, particularly on Sydney radio station 2UE. In 1958 it became a massive hit all over Australia, and remains the first and only 78 to be certified an Australian gold record. In 1959, it reached No. 3 in the UK and No. 1 in Ireland, as well as becoming popular in Canada and the USA.

== Later career ==
Parsons wrote numerous other songs, and also contributed the hook and chorus for Chad Morgan’s classic "The Fatal Wedding", but made only a few records in the 20 years after his 78-rpm discs of the 1950s. In 1978, he married his third wife, Jeanette, and they settled in Sydney.

Parsons died on 17 August 1990, at age 63, and is buried in Pinegrove Cemetery.

== Discography ==
=== Charity singles ===
List of singles as featured artist, with selected chart positions
Title	Year	Peak chart positions
Title	Year	AUS
"The Garden" (as Australia Too)	1985	22

== Honours and awards ==
=== Australian Roll of Renown ===
The Australian Roll of Renown honours Australian and New Zealander musicians who have shaped the music industry by making a significant and lasting contribution to Country Music. It was inaugurated in 1976 and the inductee is announced at the Country Music Awards of Australia in Tamworth in January.

Year	Nominee / work	Award	Result
1982	Gordon Parsons	Australian Roll of Renown	inductee

There is also a bust of Parsons in Tamworth.
