= Duncan (Slim Dusty song) =

- Australian 7" label (no picture sleeve)

Single by Slim Dusty

from the album No. 50: The Golden Anniversary Album
- B-side: "Duncan" (Version Two)
- Released: November 1980
- Genre: Country
- Length: 2:34
- Label: EMI Columbia
- Songwriter: John Patrick Alexander

"Duncan" is an Australian single recorded in 1980 by Slim Dusty which reached No. 1 on the Kent Music Report charts for two weeks in early 1981. The song was Dusty's second-most successful single after "A Pub with No Beer". It is also known as "Beer with Duncan", "Have a Beer with Duncan" and "I Love to Have a Beer with Duncan". It was written by Pat Alexander.

== Genesis ==
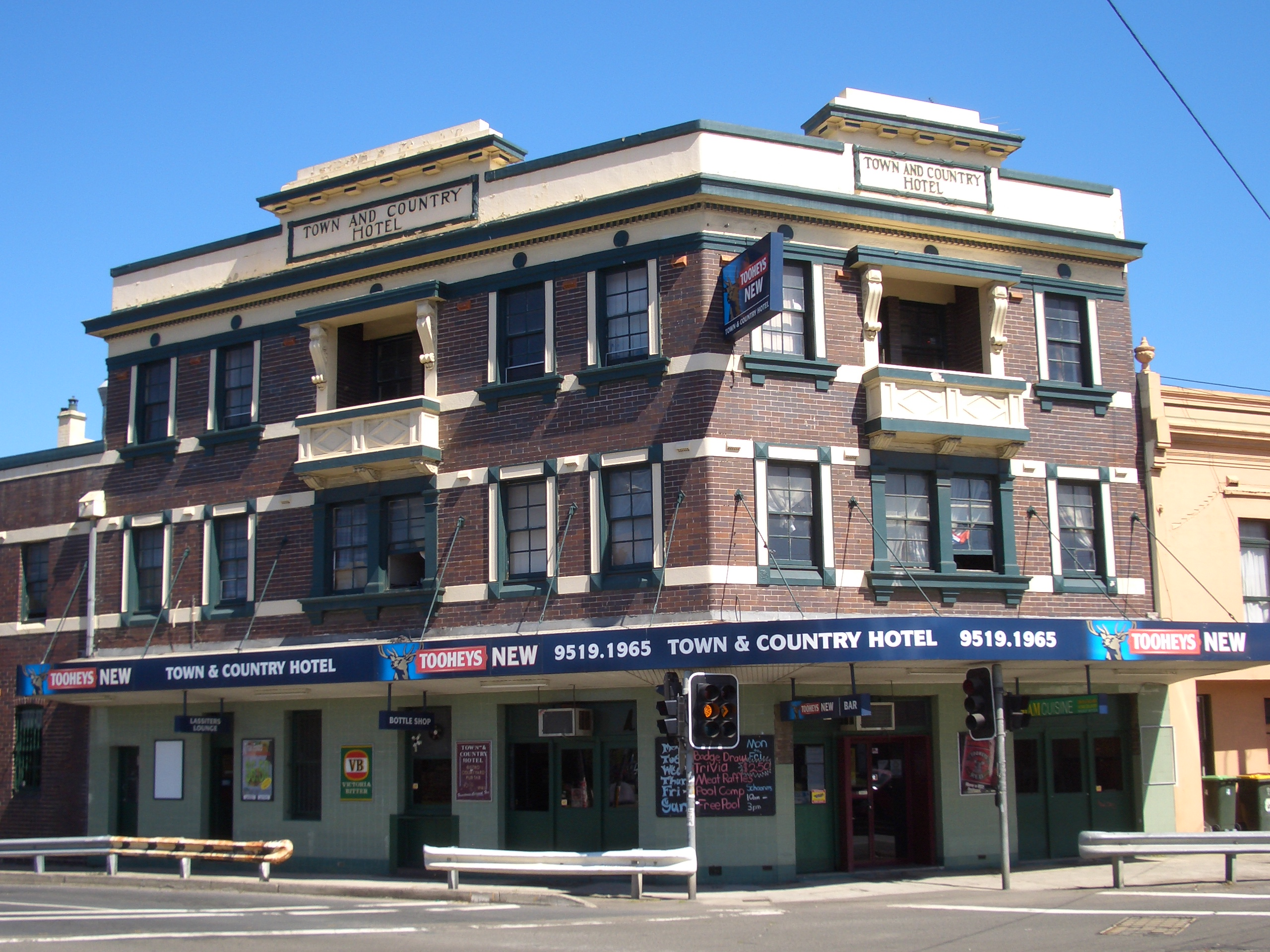
The Town and Country Hotel, Unwins Bridge Road, St Peters, in 2006. "Duncan"'s writer Pat Alexander had met Duncan Urquhart here in 1976 for drinks, attempting to sell him life insurance.

"Duncan"'s music and lyrics were written by Pat Alexander, who started writing its main verse in 1976. Alexander had been selling life insurance and spent some time talking and drinking with a prospective customer, factory owner Duncan Urquhart, at the Town and Country Hotel in St Peters, New South Wales. He failed to make the sale, but realised Urquhart merely enjoyed having a drink with him.

"Duncan" was Alexander's only commercially successful song.

== Slim Dusty recording ==
In June 1980, Bob Hawke was making his first bid to become Prime Minister of Australia. Alexander, who was working in the ABC TV mail room, recorded a novelty song, "The Bob Hawke Song", which was broadcast on ABC News. Alexander pressed two hundred 7" vinyl records of "The Bob Hawke Song", with "Duncan" on the B-side, and sent them out to radio stations and performers.

Dusty was recording The Slim Dusty Family in September 1980 and recalled his wife Joy McKean playing the demo 7" to him saying "This is a bit different, put it on and have a listen." McKean recalled telling Dusty "You could adapt it to suit all different names and it's really catchy!"

The song was recorded by Dusty in October 1980, with arrangement by Garry Marks. McKean recalled "we had the Saltbush bass player... and it is Paul Pyle's voice that calls out 'One more!' at the end." The score was published by Private Practise and became a "good seller". Dusty's version is scored for piano and guitar in the key of E♭ major, with a voice range of B♭3–B♭4.

The single was released on EMI's Columbia label in November 1980 and was played by John Laws on radio station 2UE eleven times the first morning. In order to assist in promoting the song Dusty provided special recordings which included the radio announcers' names. The official video for the song was filmed at the Town and Country Hotel and starts with Duncan Urquhart sitting to Dusty's left and Pat Alexander to Dusty's right.

The song climbed the Australian charts, hitting No. 1 on the Kent Music Report singles chart for 16 February 1981 and 23 February 1981. It charted for 23 weeks, and became the No. 16 biggest selling single in Australia in 1981 and was certified gold. In New Zealand, it entered the RIANZ chart at No. 7 on 5 April 1981, remaining in the top 50 for 10 weeks. It did not chart elsewhere, although it did receive considerable airplay on the BBC in the UK.

"Duncan" was first included on Dusty's 1981 album, No. 50: The Golden Anniversary Album and appeared on eight subsequent releases: Beer Drinking Songs of Australia (1986), 91 Over 50 (1996), The Very Best of Slim Dusty (1998), The Man Who Is Australia (2000), A Piece of Australia (2001), Slim Dusty Live (2006), Pubs, Trucks & Plains (2008) and The Very Best of Slim Dusty (2013).

== Track listing ==
Duncan
No.	Title	Writer(s)	Length
1.	"Duncan" (Version One)	John Patrick Alexander	2:34
2.	"Duncan" (Version Two)	John Patrick Alexander	2:34
Total length:			5:08

== Charts ==
=== Weekly charts ===
Chart (1981)	Peak position
Australia (Kent Music Report)	1
New Zealand (RIANZ)	7

=== Year-end charts ===
Chart (1981)	Position
Australia (Kent Music Report)	16

=== Certifications ===
Certifications for "Duncan"
Region	Certification	Certified units/sales
Australia (ARIA)	Platinum	70,000^{‡}
^{‡} Sales+streaming figures based on certification alone.

== Later uses ==
When Australian Labor Party politician Duncan Kerr was running for the Division of Denison in Tasmania in 1987, his advertising campaign was based on the song "Duncan". Kerr won the seat and remained the local member until 2010.

Dusty re-recorded the song with Rolf Harris in 1996. Dusty also recorded a version of the song in 2000, "I Love to Have a Dance with Dorothy", with the Wiggles, which appeared on the Wiggles' tenth album, It's a Wiggly Wiggly World.
