= When the Rain Tumbles Down in July =

Single by Slim Dusty
- B-side: "My Faded Dream"
- Released: 1947
- Recorded: November 1946
- Genre: Country
- Label: Regal Zonophone
- Songwriter(s): Slim Dusty

"When the Rain Tumbles Down in July" is an Australian country music song written by Slim Dusty. It has been covered by several other artists including Lee Kernaghan, Graeme Connors as well as Dusty's daughter Anne Kirkpatrick. The song was recorded in November 1946 and it is recognised as being Dusty's first commercial recording.

== About the song ==
"When the Rain Tumbles Down in July" is one of the earliest compositions of Australian country music singer Slim Dusty, Australia's most prolific musical artist. He wrote the song aged 18, while living at Nulla Nulla Creek (Formal name: Bellbrook, New South Wales), New South Wales in 1945. In 1947, Dusty signed his first recording contract with the Columbia Graphophone Co. for the Regal Zonophone label and recorded six titles including "When The Rain Tumbles Down in July". The song remained a standard for Dusty until his death in 2003.

== Content ==
The song is a bush ballad, evocative of the tradition of Australian bush poetry. It concerns the flood season in the mountainous Macleay Valley where Slim Dusty grew up in the 1930s and early 1940s.

== See also ==
- Bush ballad
