= Joy McKean =

Australian country music singer-songwriter (1930–2023)

Joy McKean OAM

Background information
- Born: Mildred Geraldine Joy McKean; 14 January 1930; Singleton, New South Wales, Australia
- Died: 25 May 2023 (aged 93)
- Genre: Country
- Occupations: Singer-songwriter, musician, talent manager
- Years active: 1940–2023
- Formerly of: The McKean Sisters (1948–1956)
- Spouse: Slim Dusty (m. 1951; died 2003)

Mildred Geraldine Joy Kirkpatrick OAM (née McKean; 14 January 1930 – 25 May 2023), was an Australian country music singer-songwriter and wife and manager of Slim Dusty. Her daughter is country singer and musician Anne Kirkpatrick.

McKean was known as The Grand Lady of Australian country music, and considered a pioneer in the industry, recognized as one of Australia's leading songwriters and bush balladeers and wrote several of Dusty's most popular songs. In 1973, she was awarded the first ever Golden Guitar, for writing "Lights on the Hill". Several documentary films tell of the couple's success and adventures as performers, including The Slim Dusty Movie and Slim and I.

The McKean-Dusty partnership produced over 100 albums, and sold eight million records in Australia alone.

McKean was awarded the OAM in 1991, with the citation "services to the entertainment industry".

In 2014, a bronze statue of McKean and Slim Dusty was unveiled in Tamworth, New South Wales

McKean won several APRA Awards and was inducted into the Australian Roll of Renown in 1983. She was the first winner of the Golden Guitars, an award she would win 45 times in her career.

== Biography ==
=== Early life and career ===
Joy McKean was born in Singleton in the Hunter Region, New South Wales, on 14 January 1930. As an infant, McKean lived on the dairy farm belonging to her mother's family. Her father was a country school teacher and the family moved around to several regional centres during her youth. Her mother and their father, who was a steel guitar player, encouraged an interest in different types of music, including country performers Jimmie Rogers and the Carter Family. Joy learned the accordion, piano and steel guitar, while younger sister Heather McKean learned the ukulele and both took up yodeling. McKean also contracted polio as a child and was treated in Sydney by the famous Sister Kenny.

McKean first performed on the radio around the age of 10 on Sydney's 2GB radio station. Later McKean and her sister, Heather McKean (born 20 February 1932), sang for the Sydney University Revue, while a student at the university. By the age of 18, in the 1940s, she was performing live with her sister Heather on their own half-hour Saturday radio show on 2KY as the McKean Sisters, noted for their yodelling harmonies. The Melody Trail starring the two sisters ran from 1949 until 1956. The McKeans began recording, and from 1951 with Rodeo Label they cut such trademark hits as "Gymkhana Yodel" and "Yodel Down The Valley". During this time, McKean met Slim Dusty, introduced by radio DJ Tim McNamara in Sydney.

=== Marriage and musical partnership with Slim Dusty ===
Joy McKean married Slim Dusty (real name David Kirkpatrick) in 1951 (becoming Mrs Kirkpatrick, but retaining Joy McKean as her stage name). Sister Heather met Reg Lindsay, whom she married in 1954 and the sisters began solo careers and partnerships with two of Australia's leading male country music singers. McKean was Dusty's wife and manager for over 50 years, creating a hugely successful body of work. Dusty and McKean had two children: Anne Kirkpatrick and David Kirkpatrick who are also accomplished singer-songwriters. The family began annual round Australia tours in 1964 – encompassing a 30,000-mile, 10-month journey which was the subject of a feature film, The Slim Dusty Movie in 1984.

Dusty attained international success with his 1957 hit "A Pub With No Beer", and remained at the forefront of Australian country music from that time until his death in 2003. Together they produced more than 100 albums, sold eight million records in Australia alone, and earned 45 Golden Guitars. McKean developed a flair for melody and musical storytelling with vivid evocative imagery. She was awarded the first ever Golden Guitar award in 1973, for writing "Lights on the Hill", performed by Dusty. Other popular songs written by McKean for her husband include: "Walk A Country Mile", "Indian Pacific", "Kelly's Offsider", "The Angel of Goulburn Hill" and "The Biggest Disappointment".

In 1993 the McKean Sisters reunited to record a CD, "The McKeans on Stage" and continued to perform together on stage various times with the Slim Dusty Show over the subsequent decade leading up to Slim's death in 2003 and Tamworth's tribute "Concert for Slim" in 2004. This tribute concert brought together over 30 Australian music artists and featured an historic duet performance by McKean and Paul Kelly of "Sunlander" and a cover of McKean's Lights on the Hill performed by Keith Urban.

=== Later career ===
McKean received her sixth Golden Guitar award in 2007 with "Peppimenarti Cradle" winning the Award for Bush Ballad of the Year. McKean celebrated her 80th birthday in 2010 with the Happy Birthday Joy concert at Capitol Theatre in Tamworth during the Country Music Festival in January 2010.

McKean was one of the founders of the Tamworth Country Music Festival and the Country Music Association of Australia, and was also a biographer (Slim Dusty: Another Day, Another Town). She was chair of the Slim Dusty Foundation Ltd, the organisation established to build and operate the Slim Dusty Centre in his home town of Kempsey, New South Wales. The centre opened in October 2015.

==== Documentary film ====
The 2020 Australian documentary film Slim and I, directed by Kriv Stenders was released when McKean was aged 90, and told the story of her life with Slim Dusty. The film features covers of McKean songs by acclaimed contemporary artists including Missy Higgins, Paul Kelly, Troy Cassar-Daley and Keith Urban.

Film critic Paul Byrnes wrote: "Kriv Stenders (Red Dog) gives us a loving portrait of one of the most important songwriters this country has produced – and it's not Slim Dusty. Aficionados already knew Joy McKean wrote many of her husband's best songs – in particular, Lights on the Hill and The Biggest Disappointment. Slim and I makes clear that she also kept the Slim Dusty Show on the road, managed the band, raised the kids and kept her husband from straying too far from the path of righteousness...".

The film soundtrack included a new McKean composition "I Don't Believe You", co-written with grandson James Arneman, and his wife Flora Smith, and described by Rolling Stone as "McKean at her most honest and poignant, with her iconic songwriting shining through in what was her first composition in over a decade."

== Death ==
Joy McKean died of cancer on 25 May 2023, at the age of 93.

== Honours and awards ==
=== APRA Awards ===
The APRA Awards are presented annually from 1982 by the Australasian Performing Right Association (APRA), "honouring composers and songwriters".

Year	Nominee / work	Award	Result
2021	Joy McKean	Ted Albert Award for Outstanding Services to Australian Music	awarded

=== Australian Roll of Renown ===
The Australian Roll of Renown honours Australian and New Zealander musicians who have shaped the music industry by making a significant and lasting contribution to Country Music. It was inaugurated in 1976 and the inductee is announced at the Country Music Awards of Australia in Tamworth in January. Joy has been recognised twice; once as part of The McKean Sisters and individually in 2020.

Year	Nominee / work	Award	Result
1983	The McKean Sisters	Australian Roll of Renown	inductee
2020	Joy McKean	Australian Roll of Renown	inductee

=== Australian Women in Music Awards ===
The Australian Women in Music Awards is an annual event that celebrates outstanding women in the Australian Music Industry who have made significant and lasting contributions in their chosen field. They commenced in 2018.

Year	Nominee / work	Award	Result
2019	Joy McKean	Lifetime Achievement Award	awarded

=== Country Music Awards of Australia ===
The Country Music Awards of Australia (CMAA) (also known as the Golden Guitar Awards) is an annual awards night held in January during the Tamworth Country Music Festival, celebrating recording excellence in the Australian country music industry. They have been held annually since 1973.

Year	Nominee / work	Award	Result(wins only)
1973	"Lights on the Hill" (written by Joy McKean) recorded by Slim Dusty	APRA Song of the Year	Won
1975	"Biggest Disappointment" (written by Joy McKean) recorded by Slim Dusty	APRA Song of the Year	Won
1978	"Indian Pacific" (written by Joy McKean) recorded by Slim Dusty	APRA Song of the Year	Won
1979	"Beat of the Government Stroke" (written by Joy McKean & Tom Oliver) recorded by Slim Dusty	APRA Song of the Year	Won
1998	"Lady Is a Truckie" (written by Joy McKean) recorded by Slim Dusty	Bush Ballad of the Year	Won
2007	"Peppimenarti Cradle" (written by Joy McKean) recorded by Anne Kirkpatrick	Bush Ballad of the Year	Won

=== Tamworth Songwriters Awards ===
The Tamworth Songwriters Association (TSA) is an annual songwriting contest for original country songs, awarded in January at the Tamworth Country Music Festival. They commenced in 1986. Joy McKean has won three awards.

Year	Nominee / work	Award	Result (wins only)
1993	"Calloused Hands" by Joy McKean and Tony Brooks	Traditional Bush Ball of the Year	Won
1994	"Ringer from the Top End" by Joy McKean	Traditional Bush Ball of the Year	Won
2005	Joy McKean	Tex Morton Award	awarded
