= Lights on the Hill (song) =

Song by Joy McKean

"Lights on the Hill" is an Australian country music hit song written by Joy McKean and made famous by her husband, Slim Dusty. It won the first Golden Guitar in January 1973 at the Country Music Awards of Australia, held in Tamworth. It has been covered by Keith Urban and Mental as Anything.

The song describes a truckie driving at night with a heavy load being blinded by lights on the hill, hitting a pole, falling off the edge of a road and realising his impending death.

The song won for Joy McKean the first ever Golden Guitar Award for "Song of the Year" at the first Tamworth Country Music Festival in January 1973, and Slim Dusty's rendition won the award for Best EP or Single.

== Certifications ==
Certifications for "Lights on the Hill"
Region	Certification	Certified units/sales
Australia (ARIA)	Platinum	70,000^{‡}
^{‡} Sales+streaming figures based on certification alone.

== The Lights on the Hill Truck and Coach Drivers' Memorial ==
A memorial which bears the name of the song was erected in Gatton, Queensland, in remembrance of truck and coach drivers and other members of the transport industry who have lost their lives in accidents or in other ways. It is located at Lake Apex Park on the outskirts of the town. Before Slim Dusty died, he and his wife Joy McKean agreed to the use of the name, Lights on the Hill, and to be patrons of the memorial.

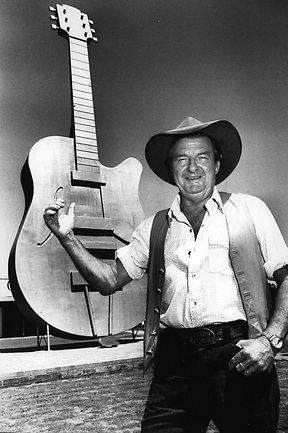
Slim Dusty

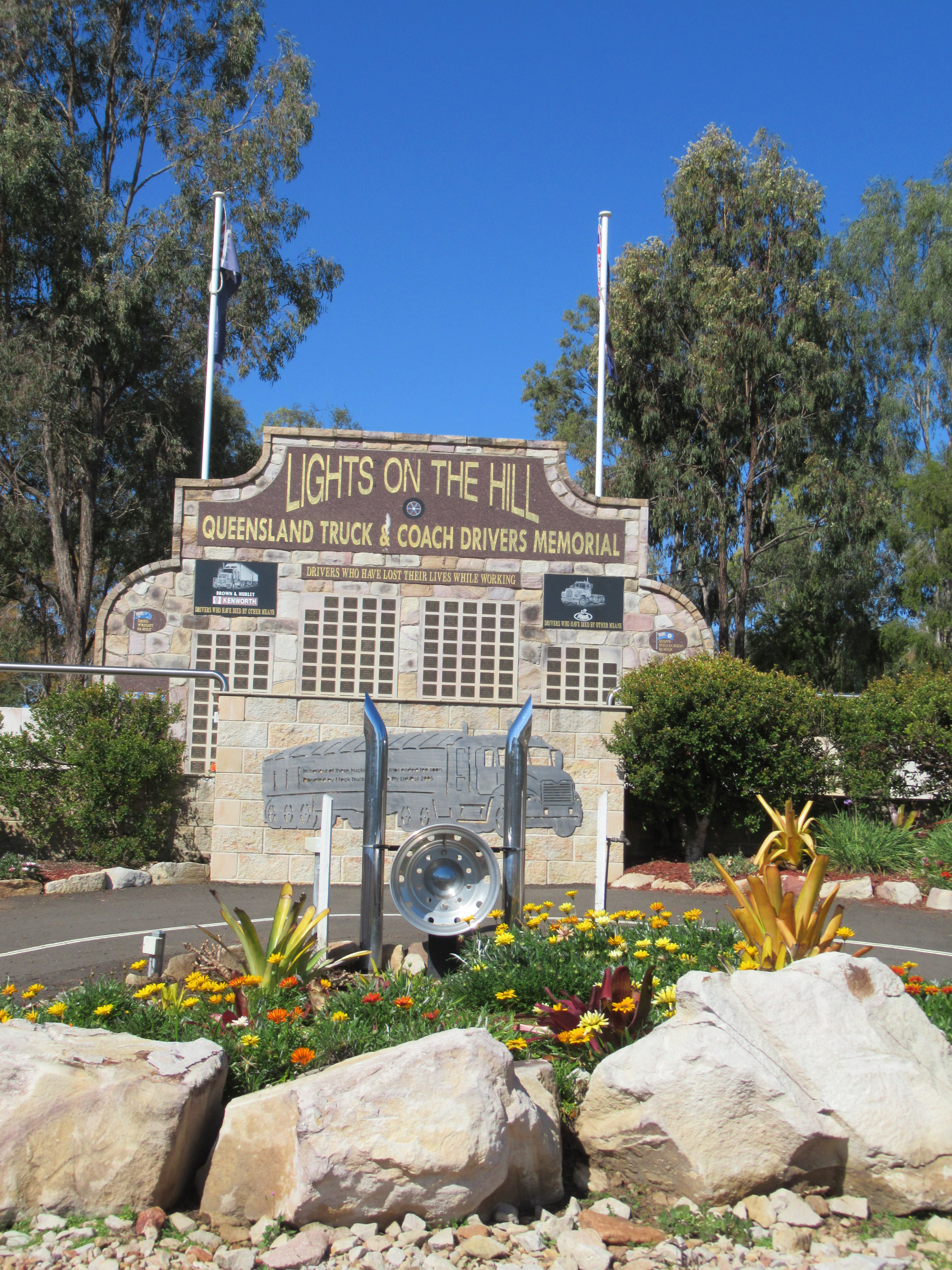
Lights on the Hill Memorial, Gatton, Queensland

== See also ==
- Bush ballad
