= A Pub with No Beer =

Single by Slim Dusty
- B-side: "Saddle Boy"
- Released: 1957
- Recorded: 1957
- Genre: Folk; country
- Label: Columbia
- Songwriter: Gordon Parsons

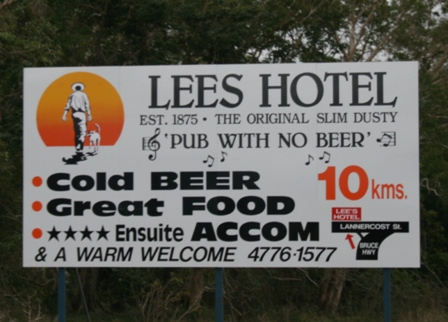
Pub with No Beer sign in Ingham Australia

"A Pub with No Beer" is the title of a humorous country song made famous by country singers Slim Dusty (in Australia, the United Kingdom and the United States) and Bobbejaan Schoepen (in Belgium, the Netherlands, Germany and Austria).

Gordon Parsons wrote and arranged the song about his local pub at Taylors Arm, New South Wales, adapted from Irish poet Dan Sheahan's original poem "A Pub Without Beer" about the Day Dawn Hotel in Ingham, North Queensland, and set to the tune of Stephen Foster's "Beautiful Dreamer". The song gently explores the "devastation" caused to a pub and its community when its beer supply is interrupted.

The song was first performed in public by Parsons in 1954 at the 50th birthday of George Thomas, a resident of Creek Ridge Road, Glossodia (near Windsor in Sydney). It was performed with an extra verse that was dropped from Slim Dusty's recorded version, because it contained elements of blue humour.

In January 2018, as part of Triple M's "Ozzest 100", the 'most Australian' songs of all time, "A Pub with No Beer" was ranked number 45.

== Australia ==
In 1957, Slim Dusty's version of "A Pub with No Beer" became the first Australian single to become a gold record and was the biggest-selling record by an Australian at the time. It was the first single by an Australian artist to enter the British charts, reaching number three. The song was also covered by country artist Johnny Ashcroft in 1957. His version was also released in the US and Canada, and reportedly sold over 100,000 copies in Australia on budget-priced plastic-coated cardboard records.

In 1959, Dusty wrote and recorded a sequel, "The Answer To A Pub With No Beer", explaining the reason for the beer delivery truck's failure to arrive and describing the townsmen's efforts to solve the problem. Another sequel, "The Sequel to a Pub with No Beer", shows that the town now has a guaranteed delivery, thanks to air freight.

In May 2001, Australasian Performing Right Association (APRA) celebrated its 75th anniversary by naming the Best Australian Songs of all time. As decided by a 100 strong industry panel, "A Pub With No Beer" was ranked fifth on the list. In June 2008, the song was included in the National Film and Sound Archive's Sounds of Australia registry.

=== Charts ===
Weekly chart performance for "A Pub with No Beer"
| Chart (1957–1959) | Peak position |
|---|---|
| Australia (Kent Music Report) | 1 |
| UK Singles (Official Charts) | 3 |

=== Certifications ===
Certifications for "A Pub with No Beer"
| Region | Certification | Certified units/sales |
|---|---|---|
| Australia (ARIA) Original release | Gold | 50,000^{^} |
| Australia (ARIA) 1979 re-release | Platinum | 70,000^{‡} |
^{^} Shipments figures based on certification alone.^{‡} Sales+streaming figures based on certification alone.

== Europe ==
Belgian entertainer Bobbejaan Schoepen recorded the song in several languages. His Dutch version ("Café zonder bier") debuted in 1959 and his German version ("Ich steh an der Bar und ich habe kein Geld") in 1960. Both became number one hits in Belgium and in Austria. The song remained in the German charts for 30 weeks, where it reached number six.

The song spent 15 weeks on the UK Singles Chart, peaking at No 3 in 1959.

"A Pub with No Beer" is also the theme song and title of a 1962 Belgian-British film starring Bobbejaan Schoepen, also known as De Ordonnans and At the Drop of a Head. In 1999, the alternative rock band Dead Man Ray wrote (partly) a new soundtrack for the film and went on tour with it in the Low Countries. The band also covered the song and released it on one of their albums.

The song became the first song to hit No.1 on the Evening Herald Irish Singles Charts in February 1959.

== Canada ==
This song was very popular in Ontario, Canada, following a strike by brewery workers. Starting on Thursday, August 7, 1958, when 1,200 Brewers Warehousing Ltd. (Brewers Retail) employees walked off their jobs over pay, there were industry-wide layoffs as retail beer was no longer available. Originally aimed at Brewers Warehousing, the dispute quickly spread as contracts at various breweries across Ontario came up for renewal. Their actions stopped the flow of beer from various breweries for 48 days and sales of hard liquor increased 25 percent. Non-unionized Formosa Spring operated at full capacity until it ran out of beer August 29, 1958. Many people purchased beer smuggled in from US and Quebec with bootleggers collecting up to C$20.00 for a case of 24 pints (previously sold at C$4.25). This song could be heard daily on most radio stations during the beer strike. The version by Barry Nesbitt reached No. 15 on the CHUM Charts in October.

== United States ==
In 1964, Benny Barnes from Beaumont, Texas, Americanized the lyrics to "A Pub with No Beer" and titled it "Bar with No Beer." The song became a regional hit on the Hall-Way label. The melody of the song is almost identical to Stephen Foster's "Beautiful Dreamer". "Bar with No Beer" was recorded by Tom T. Hall in 1985 on the album Song in a Seashell. Johnny Cash, who also performed the song, advised him to record it.

== Renditions ==
Anne Kirkpatrick & Slim Dusty, Bobbejaan Schoepen (Benelux, Germany, Austria, 1959/60), Johnny Cash, Wilf Carter, Harry Hibbs, Bluey Francis, Errol Gray, Foster & Allen, Gordon Parsons, the Irish Rovers, Johnny Greenwood, John Williamson (performed a parody version of the song called "A Dog With No Hair"), Nokturnl, Richard Clayderman, Rodney Vincent, the Singing Kettles, Stewart Peters and the Ten Tenors are examples of artists that have covered the song. Other sources identify versions by Johnny Ashcroft, the Pogues, Danny O'Flaherty, Patsy Watchorn, the Clancy Brothers, Merv Allen & the Jimmy Johnston Showband and Wilson Cole, Rolf Harris (UK, 1963), Hamish Imlach (UK, 1995), the Dubliners (1967), Adge Cutler & the Wurzels (UK, 1968), Midnight Oil (Australia, 1998), Dead Man Ray (Belgium, 2001), and Donut Kings (2009).
