= The Very Best of Lee Kernaghan: Three Decades of Hits =

Greatest hits album by Lee Kernaghan
- Released: 14 January 2022
- Recorded: 1992–2021
- Genre: Country
- Length: 201
- Label: ABC Music, Universal Music Australia

Lee Kernaghan chronology
Backroad Nation (2019)	The Very Best of Lee Kernaghan: Three Decades of Hits (2022)	Live At Deni Ute Muster (2022)

The Very Best of Lee Kernaghan: Three Decades of Hits is the third greatest hits album by Australian country musician Lee Kernaghan. The 3 disc, 62-track album, released on 14 January 2022 peaked at number 17 on the ARIA chart.

== Background and release ==
In choosing the songs for the collection, Kernaghan listened to everything he had recorded saying "I had a top list of about 150 songs but I had to get it down to 60." Upon release, Kernaghan said "The 30th Anniversary of The Outback Club; It's been an amazing ride, 3 decades of music making, song writing, recording and singing songs about the people and the country that I love. This special 3-disc set has been specially compiled to take you on a musical journey through the hits and musical highlights of my career. Disc 1 features the very best of the 90s – from The Outback Club all the way through to the Hat Town album. Everything we recorded back then was on two-inch multitrack tape that gave the songs a special warmth and fidelity that you only ever hear on analogue recordings. Disc 2 will transport you to the second decade of my career, the Electric Rodeo years and some of the best recordings from that era. Disc 3 takes you from Planet Country to the best of Backroad Nation."

The album was announced on 14 December 2021 and available for pre-order the same day.

== Track listing ==
Disc 1

1. "Boys from the Bush"
2. "High Country"
3. "Walkin' out West"
4. "You're the Reason I Never Saw Hank Jnr Play"
5. "Country's Really Big These Days"
6. "Searchin' for Another You"
7. "The Outback Club"
8. "Three Chain Road"
9. "She's My Ute"
10. "The Burning Heart"
11. "Leave Him in the Longyard" (featuring Slim Dusty)
12. "Dust on My Boots"
13. "Scrubbashin'"
14. "Where Country Is"
15. "Janine"
16. "Hat Town"
17. "Bare Essentials"
18. "Goondiwindi Moon"
19. "A Few of Us Left"
20. "When the Snow Falls on the Alice"
21. "Pass the Bottle 'Round"

CD2

1. "I'm from the Country" (featuring Travis Sinclair)
2. "The Way It Is"
3. "Electric Rodeo"
4. "Something in the Water"
5. "An Ordinary Bloke"
6. "Baptise the Ute"
7. "Long Night"
8. "You Rock My World"
9. "That Old Caravan"
10. "Texas Qld 4385"
11. "Rules of the Road"
12. "Cunnamulla Feller"
13. "Where I Come from"
14. "Missin' Slim" (featuring Colin Buchanan)
15. "The New Bush"
16. "Close as a Whisper (The Gift)"
17. "Love Shack" (Groove mix)
18. "Diamantina Drover"
19. "Sassafras Gap"
20. "Spirit of the Bush" (featuring Adam Brand & Steve Forde)

CD3

1. "Planet Country"
2. "Love in a Time of Drought"
3. "Dirt"
4. "Gold"
5. "Scars" (featuring Dierks Bentley)
6. "The Old Block"
7. "I Milk Cows"
8. "Beautiful Noise"
9. "Australian Boy"
10. "Flying with the King"
11. "It's Only Country"
12. "Something Right"
13. "Ute Me"
14. "Damn Good Mates" (featuring The Wolfe Brothers)
15. "Lights on the Hill" (featuring The Wolfe Brothers)
16. "Where I Wanna Be" (featuring Robby X)
17. "Wheels"
18. "Peace Love & Country"
19. "Backroad Nation"
20. "Spirit of the Anzacs" (featuring Guy Sebastian, Sheppard, Jon Stevens, Jessica Mauboy, Shannon Noll & Megan Washington)
21. "Till It Ends" (featuring The Wolfe Brothers)

== Charts ==
=== Weekly charts ===
Weekly chart performance for The Very Best of Lee Kernaghan: Three Decades of Hits
Chart (2022)	Peak position
Australian Albums (ARIA)	17
Australian Country Albums (ARIA)	2

=== Year-end charts ===
Year-end chart performance for The Very Best of Lee Kernaghan: Three Decades of Hits
Chart (2022)	Position
Australian Artist (ARIA)	38
Australian Country Albums (ARIA)	10
Chart (2023)	Position
Australian Country Albums (ARIA)	35
Chart (2024)	Position
Australian County Albums (ARIA)	55
Chart (2025)	Position
Australian County Albums (ARIA)	74
