= Rules of the Road (Lee Kernaghan album) =

Studio album by Lee Kernaghan
- Released: January 2000
- Genre: Country
- Label: ABC
- Producer: Garth Porter

Lee Kernaghan chronology
The Christmas Album (1998)	Rules of the Road (2000)	Electric Rodeo (2002)

Rules of the Road is the sixth studio album released by Australian Country Musician, Lee Kernaghan. It was released in January 2000 and peaked at 16 on the ARIA Charts in February 2000. The album was certified gold in 2000. The album has been described as a distillation of Australian Country Music history, each song a classic and collectively, a musical 'collage' representing the entire spectrum of the bush ballad as it evolved.

The album was nominated for the ARIA Award for Best Country Album at the ARIA Music Awards of 2000.

== Track listing ==
1. "Losin' My Blues Tonight" (with special guest Anne Kirkpatrick) - 3:28
2. "Darwin Jailhouse Window" (Duet with Tex Morton) - 3:56
3. "Rules of the Road" - 4:30
4. "Cunnamulla Feller" - 3:11
5. "That's the Kind of Life I Live" - 2:31
6. "Where the White Faced Cattle Roam" (Duet with Buddy Williams) - 2:19
7. "The Glass on the Bar" - 3:34
8. "Winter Winds" - 3:46
9. "Aussie Doghouse Blues" - 2:35
10. "By a Fire of Gidgee Coal" (with special guest harmonies Tracy Coster) - 3:28
11. "Overlander Trail" (with Smoky Dawson, Reg Lindsay and Ray Kernaghan) - 2:51
12. "Camooweal" - 4:10
13. "Following the Light" (with the Crosby Sisters and Lynette Guest) - 3:05
14. "A Bushman Can't Survive" (Duet with Tania Kernaghan) - 4:33
15. "Days of Old Khancoban" (Duet with Smoky Dawson) - 3:03
16. "Leave Him in the Longyard" (with Slim Dusty) - 3:16

== Charts ==
Chart (2000)	Peak position
Australian Albums (ARIA)	16

== Certifications ==
Region	Certification	Certified units/sales
Australia (ARIA)	Gold	35,000^{^}
^{^} Shipments figures based on certification alone.
