= Not So Dusty (album) =

Compilation album
- Released: 7 September 1998
- Label: EMI

Singles from Not So Dusty
- 1. "Cunnamulla Feller" Released: 7 September 1998

Not So Dusty is a compilation album of Slim Dusty songs covered by Australian musicians. It was released in Australia by EMI in 1998. It was nominated for a 1999 ARIA Award for Best Country Album.

Not So Dusty received positive reviews and was certified gold. Gary Tippet of the Sunday Age gave it 3 stars and Peter Lalor of the Daily Telegraph gave it 7/10 although he noted that most of the Australian country outfits on the album "seem to bland out with their attempt at authentic outings". Keith Glass writing in the Sunday Herald Sun says "but what could have been a dodgy concept is mainly highly entertaining." The Age's Mike Daly calls it "a splendid tribute by some diverse performers." and the Sunday Mail calls it a "wonderful tribute".

It was reported that Slim Dusty enjoyed the album saying "I've had a lot of tributes over the years but that's a very touching one. I feel very honoured – everyone really put their heart and soul into each track."

At the ARIA Music Awards of 1999, the album was nominated for Best Country Album.

== Singles ==
The album's lead single was "Cunnamulla Feller" performed by The Screaming Jets.

== Track listing ==
1. "When the Rain Tumbles Down in July" – Graeme Connors
2. "Pub With No Beer" – Midnight Oil
3. "Drowning My Blues" – Tom T. Hall & The McCormacks
4. "Lights on the Hill" – Mental As Anything
5. "Walk A Country Mile" – Keith Urban
6. "Losin' My Blues Tonight" – Michael Spiby
7. "Saddle Boy" – Dead Ringer Band
8. "Wedding Bell Blues" – Ross Wilson With The Feral Swing Katz
9. "Indian Pacific" – Tania Kernaghan & Ray Kernaghan
10. "Things Are Not The Same on the Land" – Karma County
11. "The Sunlander" – Paul Kelly & Uncle Bill
12. "The Biggest Disappointment" – Troy Cassar-Daley
13. "Gumtrees by the Roadway" – Anne Kirkpatrick & David Kirkpatrick
14. "Highway Fever" – Don Walker
15. "Plains of Peppimenarti" – James Blundell
16. "Cunnamulla Feller" – The Screaming Jets
17. "Camooweal" – Ed Kuepper & His Oxley Creek Playboys & Felicity
18. "I Must Have Good Terbaccy When I Smoke" – John Williamson
