= Ultimate Hits (Lee Kernaghan album) =

Greatest hits album by Lee Kernaghan
- Released: 30 September 2011
- Recorded: 1992–2011
- Genre: Country, pub rock
- Length: 153:12
- Label: ABC Music, Universal Music Australia

Lee Kernaghan chronology
Planet Country (2009)	Ultimate Hits (2011)	Beautiful Noise (2012)

Ultimate Hits is the second greatest hits album by Australian country musician Lee Kernaghan. It was released in September 2011, peaked at No.8 on the ARIA chart. The album was certified gold in 2013.

Kernaghan invited his fans on Facebook to help him select the tracks for this album.

While promoting the album, Kernaghan said; "It's my mates out there that have put these songs on the map. The people who have come out to the shows, bought the records and made these songs a part of the soundtrack of their lives. This is the part of being in music that pulls on my heart the most and makes all the highs and lows worthwhile."

== Reviews ==
Jon O'Brien of AllMusic gave the album 3.5/5, saying; "Ultimate Hits, a 42-track compilation selected by his fan base, is therefore the ideal opportunity for those looking for the best that the country scene down under has to offer to see what all the fuss is about". He added "With his authentic tales of life in the outback and championing of the late Aussie country legend Slim Dusty, it's easy to see why his traditional brand of blue-collar country-rock has struck a chord with homegrown audiences". He concluded by saying "It's a solid collection of no-nonsense country-rock anthems proving that his unparalleled success is more than justified."

== Track listing ==
Disc 1

1. "Boys From the Bush"
2. "Dirt"
3. "Goondiwindi Moon" (with Trisha Yearwood)
4. "She's My Ute"
5. "The Way It Is"
6. "High Country"
7. "Love in the Time of Drought"
8. "Cunnamulla Fella"
9. "Scars"
10. "Listen to the Radio"
11. "Changi Banjo"
12. "Getting' Gone"
13. "Leave Him in the Longyard" (with Slim Dusty)
14. "You Rock My World"
15. "Three Chain Road"
16. "Scrubbashin'"
17. "Mate"
18. "Country Crowd"
19. "Skinny Dippin'"
20. "This Cowboy's Hat"
21. "Australian Boy"

Disc 2

1. "Planet Country"
2. "Fire" (by Lee & Robby)
3. "Spirit of the Bush" (with Adam Brand & Steve Forde)
4. "Baptise The Ute"
5. "When the Snow Falls On the Alice"
6. "Something in the Water"
7. "I Milk Cows"
8. "Shake On It"
9. "Hat Town"
10. "Something Right"
11. "The New Bush"
12. "Close As a Whisper (The Gift)"
13. "Love Shack" (Groove Mix - Radio Edit)
14. "Cowgirls Do"
15. "Diamantina Dream" (with Trisha Yearwood)
16. "Great Balls of Fire" (Live at CMC Rocks)
17. "Electric Rodeo"
18. "Missin' Slim" (with Colin Buchanan)
19. "Texas QLD 4385"
20. "The Outback Club"

== Charts ==
=== Weekly charts ===
Chart (2011–14)	Peak position
Australian Albums (ARIA)	8

=== Year-end charts ===
Chart (2011)	Position
ARIA Artist Albums Chart	98
ARIA Australian Artist Albums Chart	17
ARIA Country Albums Chart	5
Chart (2012)	Position
ARIA Country Albums Chart	25
Chart (2013)	Position
ARIA Country Albums Chart	22
Chart (2014)	Position
ARIA Country Albums Chart	29
Chart (2015)	Position
ARIA Country Albums Chart	17
Chart (2016)	Position
ARIA Country Albums Chart	24
Chart (2017)	Position
ARIA Country Albums Chart	30

== Certifications ==
Region	Certification	Certified units/sales
Australia (ARIA)	Gold	35,000^{^}
^{^} Shipments figures based on certification alone.
