= Fiona Kernaghan =

- Born: Fiona Sheree Kernaghan; 1973 (age 52–53)
- Genre: Pop
- Occupations: Musician; singer-songwriter
- Instruments: Vocals; guitar
- Years active: 1993–present
- Labels: ABC/EMI; Red Rebel/Automatic
- Website: fionakernaghan.com

Fiona Sheree Kernaghan (born 1973) is an Australian singer-songwriter and guitarist. She has released three solo albums, Cypress Grove (1995), Shadow Wine and Truth Lilies (2007) and The Art of Being (2017). Cypress Grove was nominated for Best New Talent at the ARIA Music Awards of 1996. Kernaghan is the daughter of country musician, Ray Kernaghan, and the sister of Lee and Tania Kernaghan.

== Biography ==
Fiona Sheree Kernaghan was born in 1973. She is the daughter of Pamela and Ray Kernaghan and the younger sister of Lee, Greg and Tania Kernaghan. She learnt to play guitar from her elder siblings and performed in a covers band before deciding to write her own material.

Kernaghan and Tania co-wrote, "I'll Be Gone", with Heather Field and James Gillard; it was released by Tania in 1992 as her first single. Kernaghan then worked with Keith Urban to record demo versions of her songs. Her debut album, Cypress Grove (1995), was nominated for Best New Talent at the ARIA Music Awards of 1996. She supported the Badloves on their tour of Australia.

During 1995 Kernaghan relocated to the United States to mainly work as a songwriter, initially living in Nashville before moving to Los Angeles in 2003. Her songs have been recorded by Mindy McCready ("Take Me Apart"), Tina Arena, Felicity Urquhart, and Tania. In 2005 a compilation album, Feeling Fiona, by various artists performing songs written by Kernaghan, was released by Red Rebel/Automatic.

Kernaghan's second solo album, Shadow Wine and Truth Lilies (2007), was produced by Daniel Kresco. By October 2015 she had returned to Australia and explained, "It's so exciting to think that with the advances in technology, I can do what I do as a writer and as an artist from anywhere." Her third solo album, The Art of Being, appeared in 2017, which was produced by Todd Herfindal.

== Discography ==
=== Albums ===
| Title | Album details |
|---|---|
| Cypress Grove | Release date: 1995; Label: ABC Music/EMI (4836252) |
| Shadow Wine and Truth Lilies | Release date: 2007; Label: Red Rebel Music (RRM006FK) |
| The Art of Being | Release date: 2017; Label: Fiona Kernaghan (FK001) |

== Awards and nominations ==
=== ARIA Music Awards ===
The ARIA Music Awards is an annual awards ceremony that recognises excellence, innovation, and achievement across all genres of Australian music. They commenced in 1987.

| Year | Nominee / work | Award | Result | Ref. |
|---|---|---|---|---|
| ARIA Music Awards of 1996 | Cypress Grove | Best New Talent | Nominated | |

=== Tamworth Songwriters Awards ===
The Tamworth Songwriters Association (TSA) is an annual songwriting contest for original country songs, awarded in January at the Tamworth Country Music Festival. They commenced in 1986. Fiona Kernaghan has won three awards.

| Year | Nominee / work | Award | Result (wins only) |
|---|---|---|---|
| 1998 | "Dunroamin' Station" by Fiona Kernaghan | Songmaker Award | Won |
| 2006 | "30 Something" by Fiona Kernaghan | Contemporary Country Song of the Year | Won |
| 2006 | "30 Something" by Fiona Kernaghan | Country Song of the Year | Won |
