= 1959 (disambiguation) =

1959 was a common year starting on Thursday of the Gregorian calendar.

1959 may also refer to:

- 1959 (album), by Lee Kernaghan
- "1959" (Patti Smith song)
- "1959" (John Anderson song)
- "1959", a song by The Sisters of Mercy from the album Floodland
- "1959", a song by Hamilton Leithauser and Rostam from the album I Had a Dream That You Were Mine
- "1959", a song by Saves the Day from Ups & Downs: Early Recordings and B-Sides
- 1959: The Year Everything Changed, a book by Fred Kaplan
