= Spirit of the Bush =

Studio album by Lee Kernaghan
- Released: 14 July 2007
- Genre: Country

Lee Kernaghan chronology
The New Bush (2006)	Spirit of the Bush (2007)	Planet Country (2009)

Spirit of the Bush is the ninth studio album released by Australian country musician Lee Kernaghan. The album was released in July 2007 and peaked at number 5 on the ARIA Charts.

About the album, Kernaghan said, "This album is a collection of songs both old and new that reflect the strength of the Australian spirit. All of the songs have a special place in my life and express my deep admiration for the bush. The resilience and stories of the people have always been my greatest inspiration".

== Track listing ==
1. "Sassafras Gap"
2. "I Was Only Nineteen (A Walk in the Light Green)"
3. "Three Rivers Hotel"
4. "Spirit of the Bush" (featuring Adam Brand and Steve Forde)
5. "Diamantina Drover"
6. "Bare Essentials"
7. "The Way It Is"
8. "Spirit of the High Country"
9. "Southern Son"
10. "Shelter"
11. "When Country Comes"
12. "A Bushman Can't Survive" (featuring Tania Kernaghan)
13. "Mate"
14. "Tenterfield Saddler"
15. "Cunnamulla Feller"
16. "Hat Town"
17. "Spirit of the Bush" (reprise)

== Charts ==
=== Weekly charts ===
Chart (2007–08)	Peak position
Australian Albums (ARIA)	5

=== Year-end charts ===
Chart (2007)	Position
ARIA Artist Albums Chart	72
ARIA Australian Artist Albums Chart	28
ARIA Country Albums Chart	4
Chart (2008)	Position
ARIA Country Albums Chart	8

== Certifications ==
Region	Certification	Certified units/sales
Australia (ARIA)	Platinum	70,000^{^}
^{^} Shipments figures based on certification alone.
