= The 25th Anniversary Album =

Studio album by Lee Kernaghan
- Released: 24 March 2017
- Genre: Country
- Label: ABC Music

Lee Kernaghan chronology
Spirit of the Anzacs (2015)	The 25th Anniversary Album (2017)	Backroad Nation (2019)

Singles from The 25th Anniversary Album
- 1. "Outback Club Reunion" Released: January 2017

The 25th Anniversary Album is the fourteenth studio album by Australian country singer Lee Kernaghan. It was released digitally and physically in Australia on 24 March 2017 through ABC Music.

== Background and release ==
On 19 January 2017, the album was announced to mark the 25th anniversary of Kernaghan's country number one single, "Boys from the Bush", and the release of his debut album, The Outback Club (1992). Kernaghan has since had 34 number one hits on the Australian country music charts, won 36 Golden Guitars and has sold over two million albums in Australia. Kernaghan also performed a 25th anniversary show in Tamworth on 26 January 2017.

== Track listing ==
1. "Drive On" – 2:51
2. "Back in '92" (featuring James Blundell) – 3:09
3. "Yaraka Dust" – 3:03
4. "Outback Club Reunion" – 4:00
5. "Island of Oceans" (with John Williamson) – 2:45
6. "Trip Around the Sun" (with The McClymonts) – 3:20
7. "Damn Good Mates" (with The Wolfe Brothers) – 3:02
8. "Walk a Country Mile" (with Troy Cassar-Daley and Kasey Chambers) – 3:46
9. "High Country" (with Robby) – 3:23
10. "Ned Kelly" (with Adam Harvey) – 3:52
11. "Dumb Things" (with Adam Brand) – 2:41
12. "Somewhere Between" (with Tania Kernaghan) – 3:01
13. "Nothin' On" – 3:23

== Charts ==
=== Weekly charts ===
Chart (2017)	Peak position
Australian Albums (ARIA)	2
Australian Country Albums (ARIA)	1

=== Year-end charts ===
Chart (2017)	Position
Australian Albums (ARIA)	77
ARIA Country Albums Chart	3

== Release history ==
Region	Date	Format	Label	Catalogue
Australia	24 March 2017	CD; digital download	Mirabai, ABC Music, Universal Music Australia	LEE9898
