= The Big Ones: Greatest Hits Vol. 1 =

Compilation album by Lee Kernaghan
- Released: October 2004
- Genre: Country

Lee Kernaghan chronology
Electric Rodeo (2002)	The Big Ones: Greatest Hits Vol. 1 (2004)	The New Bush (2006)

The Big Ones: Greatest Hits Vol. 1 is the first greatest hits album released by Australian country musician Lee Kernaghan. The album was released in October 2004 and peaked at number 16 on the ARIA Charts. The album was certified platinum in 2007.

== Track listing ==
1. "Hat Town"
2. "Boys from the Bush"
3. "Something in the Water"
4. "Goondiwindi Moon"
5. "The Way it Is"
6. "Leave Him in the Longyard" (with Slim Dusty)
7. "She's My Ute"
8. "When the Snow Falls on the Alice"
9. "High Country"
10. "Skinny Dippin'"
11. "1959"
12. "Gettin' Gone"
13. "I'm from the Country" (with Travis Sinclair)
14. "Three Chain Road"
15. "She Waits by the Sliprails (The Bush Girl)"
16. "Texas QLD 4385"
17. "Electric Rodeo"
18. "The Outback Club"
19. "Missin' Slim" (with Colin Buchanan)
20. "Down Under" (bonus track)

== Charts ==
=== Weekly charts ===
Chart (2004–05)	Peak position
Australian Albums (ARIA)	16

=== Year-end charts ===
Chart (2004)	Position
ARIA Country Albums Chart	8
Chart (2005)	Position
ARIA Country Albums Chart	8

== Certifications ==
Region	Certification	Certified units/sales
Australia (ARIA)	Platinum	70,000^{^}
^{^} Shipments figures based on certification alone.
