= Driving Home for Christmas (album) =

Studio album by Lee Kernaghan
- Released: 31 October 2014
- Genre: Country, Christmas
- Label: ABC
- Producer: Garth Porter

Lee Kernaghan chronology
Beautiful Noise (2012)	Driving Home for Christmas (2014)	Spirit of the Anzacs (2015)

Driving Home for Christmas is the twelfth studio album (and second Christmas album following The Christmas Album in 1998) released by Australian country musician Lee Kernaghan. The album contains six new songs and festive classics. The album was released in October 2014 and peaked at No. 46 on the ARIA Charts in November 2014.

== Track listing ==
1. "Jingle Bell Rock" - 1:58
2. "Santa Claus Is Back in Town" - 2:56
3. "Driving Home for Christmas" - 4:09
4. "O Christmas Bush" - 3:47
5. "Merry Merry Christmas" - 3:00
6. "Mary's Boy Child" - 3:20
7. "I'll Be Home for Christmas" - 2:59
8. "Three Drovers" - 2:25
9. "Oh Little Town of Bethlehem" - 2:47
10. "We Wish You a Merry Christmas" - 2:12
11. "Christmas Waltz" - 3:28
12. "Cunnamulla Santa" - 3:05
13. "It Still Feels Like Christmas to Me" - 3:09

== Charts ==
=== Weekly charts ===
Chart (2014)	Peak position
Australian Albums (ARIA)	46

=== Year-end charts ===
Chart (2014)	Position
Australian Country Albums (ARIA)	19
