= Electric Rodeo =

Electric Rodeo may refer to:

- Electric Rodeo (Shooter Jennings album), 2006
- Electric Rodeo (Lee Kernaghan album), 2002
