= Beautiful Noise (Lee Kernaghan album) =

Studio album by Lee Kernaghan
- Released: 19 October 2012
- Recorded: Sydney, Australia; Nashville, USA.
- Genre: Country
- Label: ABC
- Producer: Garth Porter

Lee Kernaghan chronology
Ultimate Hits (2011)	Beautiful Noise (2012)	Driving Home for Christmas (2014)

Beautiful Noise is the eleventh studio album released by Australian country musician Lee Kernaghan. The album was recorded over two years in Sydney and Nashville and was released on 19 October 2012. The album peaked at 9 on the ARIA Charts in November 2012 and was certified gold in 2013.

A deluxe tour edition was released in May 2013.

At the 2014 Country Music Awards of Australia, Beautiful Noise won Top Selling Album of the Year.

== Track listing ==
Standard Edition

1. "Beautiful Noise" - 3:29
2. "Dirt Music" - 3:46
3. "Bang Bang (Shooting from the Heart)" - 3:35
4. "Keeping On" - 3:30
5. "Ute Me" - 3:04
6. "Splash" - 3:33
7. "Flying With the King" - 3:28
8. "It's Only Country" - 3:15
9. "New Kind of High" (Featuring Robby K.)- 3:21
10. "Party Town" - 3:41
11. "Peace Love & Country" - 3:46

Deluxe Tour Edition (bonus tracks)

12. "Lights on the Hill" (with The Wolfe Brothers) - 3:30
13. "I'm Already Taken" (with Robby X) - 3:12
14. "Australian Boy" (Bathurst Version) - 3:11
15. "Get Off My Land" - 2:55
16. "Mr. Goodtime" (with Colt Ford) - 3:49
17. "Hero to the Nation" (Phar Lap Theme) - 2:19
18. "Beautiful Noise "(V8 Supercars Anthem) - 3:10

DVD

1. "Ute Me" (Official Music Video)
2. "Flying With the King" (Official Music Video)
3. "Beautiful Noise" (Official Music Video)
4. "Lights on the Hill" (with The Wolfe Brothers)
5. "Boys From The Bush" (Live at CMC Rocks The Hunter)
6. "Missin' Slim" (Live at CMC Rocks The Hunter)
7. "Texas QLD 4385" (Live at CMC Rocks The Hunter)
8. "Australian Boy" (Live at the Bathurst 1000)
9. "Beautiful Noise" (Live at Bathurst 1000)

== Charts ==
=== Weekly charts ===
Chart (2012–13)	Peak position
Australian Albums (ARIA)	9

=== Year-end charts ===
Chart (2012)	Position
ARIA Australian Artist Albums Chart	30
ARIA Country Albums Chart	9
Chart (2013)	Position
ARIA Australian Artist Albums Chart	29
ARIA Country Albums Chart	6
Chart (2014)	Position
ARIA Country Albums Chart	34
Chart (2015)	Position
ARIA Country Albums Chart	54
Chart (2016)	Position
ARIA Country Albums Chart	95

== Certifications ==
Region	Certification	Certified units/sales
Australia (ARIA)	Gold	35,000^{^}
^{^} Shipments figures based on certification alone.
