= Rattlesnake Choir =

Rattlesnake Choir may refer to:

- an Australian band fronted by singer-songwriter Andrew Swift,
- a Canadian band fronted by singer-songwriter John Borra.
