= The New Bush =

Studio album by Lee Kernaghan
- Released: 29 April 2006
- Genre: Country

Lee Kernaghan chronology
The Big Ones: Greatest Hits Vol. 1 (2004)	The New Bush (2006)	Spirit of the Bush (2007)

The New Bush is the eighth studio album released by Australian Country Musician Lee Kernaghan. It was released in April 2006 and peaked at number 6 on the ARIA Charts.

The album was nominated for the ARIA Award for Best Country Album at the ARIA Music Awards of 2006. At the 2007 Country Music Awards of Australia, the album won Album of the Year and Top Selling Album of the Year.

== Track listing ==
1. "Where I Come from"
2. "Listen To The Radio"
3. "The New Bush"
4. "Diamantina Dream" (featuring Trisha Yearwood)
5. "Love Shack"
6. "Western World"
7. "I'll Remember You"
8. "Livin' in Australia"
9. "Little Men"
10. "Like Angels"
11. "On the Beach"
12. "When the Country Comes"
13. "Close As a Whisper (The Gift)"

== Charts ==
=== Weekly charts ===
Chart (2006–07)	Peak position
Australian Albums (ARIA)	6

=== Year-end charts ===
Chart (2006)	Position
ARIA Artist Albums Chart	81
ARIA Australian Artist Albums Chart	27
ARIA Country Albums Chart	6
Chart (2007)	Position
ARIA Country Albums Chart	16

== Certifications ==
Region	Certification	Certified units/sales
Australia (ARIA)	Platinum	70,000^{^}
^{^} Shipments figures based on certification alone.
