= Country Music Awards of Australia =

Annual awards in Australia

- Awarded for: Outstanding achievements in the Australian country music industry
- Country: Australia
- Presented by: 2TM Radio Tamworth, Country Music Association of Australia and Tamworth Regional Council
- First award: January 1973; 53 years ago
- Website: www.country.com.au or www.tcmf.com.au

The Country Music Awards of Australia also known as the Golden Guitar Awards (originally named Australasian Country Music Awards) is an annual awards night held in January during the Tamworth Country Music Festival, in Tamworth, New South Wales, celebrating recording excellence in the Australian country music industry. The awards are hosted at the Tamworth Regional Entertainment Centre (TRECC) on the final Saturday night of the Tamworth Festival. They have been held annually since 1973. The first award ceremony had just six awards. The awards show is presented in front of a live audience made up of the media, the music industry and the public.

As of 2025, Troy Cassar-Daley has won the most awards, at 45.

== Awards ==
The award winners are given a Golden Guitar trophy. These are cast in solid bronze on a base of polished Tasmanian Blackwood. They are 235 mm tall and weigh 1.5 kilos.

=== Australian Roll of Renown ===
Since 1976, the Australian Roll of Renown is an award to honour Australian and New Zealander country music artists who have shaped the industry by making a significant and lasting contribution to country music.

=== Major awards ===
Here is a list of major award winners.

Country Music Awards of Australia
Year	Album of the Year	Song of the Year (APRA)	Female Artist of the Year	Male Artist of the Year	Top Selling Album of the Year
1973	Me & My Guitar by Slim Dusty	"Lights On the Hill" by Slim Dusty	not awarded	not awarded	Redback on the Toilet Seat by Slim Newton
1974	Live At Tamworth by Slim Dusty	"Goondiwindi Grey" by Tex Morton	"Dust On Mother's Bible" by Suzanne Prentice	"July You're a Woman" by Reg Lindsay	Heaven Is My Woman's Love by Col Joye
1975	Australiana by Slim Dusty	"The Biggest Disappointment" by Slim Dusty	"What Kind of a Girl Do You Think I Am" by Jean Stafford	"The Biggest Disappointment" by Slim Dusty	Flowers For Mama by Jean Stafford credited by sales *not awarded
1976	Lights On the Hill by Slim Dusty	"Santa Never Made It to Darwin" by Bill & Boyd	"I Can Feel Love" by Heather McKean	"My Lancashire Yodelling Lass" by Rex Dallas	Worst in the World by Slim Dusty
1977	Angel of Goulburn Hill by Slim Dusty	"Three Rivers Hotel" by Slim Dusty	"Sweet Country Music" by Suzanne Prentice	Angel of Goulburn Hill by Slim Dusty	Things I See Around Me by Slim Dusty
1978	Country Travellin' by The Hawking Brothers	"Indian Pacific" by Slim Dusty	How Great Thou Art by Suzanne Prentice	Silence On the Line by Reg Lindsay	Indian Pacific by Slim Dusty
1979	One Day At a Time by The Hawking Bros	"Beat of the Government Stroke" by Slim Dusty	"Grievous Angel" by Anne Kirkpatrick	"Marty" by Slim Dusty	One Day At a Time by The Hawking Bros
1980	Walk a Country Mile by Slim Dusty	"Three Empty Bottles" by Dave Pincombe	Hello Love by Jean Stafford	"The Empty Arms Hotel" by Reg Lindsay	Walk a Country Mile by Slim Dusty
1981	The Man Who Steadies the Lead by Slim Dusty	"One Armed Bandit" by Allan Caswell & Brian Caswell	"That Glory Bound Train" by Jean Stafford	"I Love You So Rebecca" by Johnny Chester	The Man Who Steadies the Lead by Slim Dusty
1982	The Lady and the Cowboy by Jewel Blanch & Arthur Blanch	"His Spurs Are Rusty Now" by Rex & Colin Dallas	"I Can Love You" by Jewel Blanch	"Rough Around The Edges " by Johnny Chester	Who Put the Roo in the Stew by The Webb Brothers
1983	Too Late for Regrets by Arthur Blanch	"Used to Be a Gold Song" - Allan Caswell & Keith Potger	Send All The Ghosts Away by Jewel Blanch	"An Ad in The Weekly Times" by Johnny Chester	One Day At a Time by Suzanne Prentice
1984	On the Wallaby by Slim Dusty	"I Was Only 19" by John Schumann/Redgum	"Beautiful Lady" by Patsy Riggir	"I've Come a Long Way" by Arthur Blanch	"I Was Only 19" by John Schumann/Redgum
1985	Trucks On the Track by Slim Dusty	"Queen in the Sport of Kings" by John Williamson	You'll Never Take the Country Out of Me by Patsy Riggir	"What Do Lonely People Do" by Arthur Blanch	Trucks On the Track by Slim Dusty
1986	Road Thru the Heart by John Williamson	"The Garden" by Allan Caswell	You Remind Me of a Love Song by Patsy Riggir	"You and My Guitar" by John Williamson	Yodelling Man by Roger Tibbs
1987	Mallee Boy by John Williamson	"He's a Good Bloke When He's Sober" by Slim Dusty	Now I'm Easy by Deniese Morrison	"True Blue" by John Williamson	Patsy Rigger Country by Patsy Rigger
1988	Neon City by Slim Dusty	"The Old Time Tent Shows" by Alan Hawking	"I'm Stronger Than I Look" by Evelyn Bury	"Black Jack Blues Again" by Allan Caswell	Mallee Boy by John Williamson
1989	Boomerang Café by John Williamson	"We've Done Us Proud" by Slim Dusty	"Battle Hymn of Love" by Deniese Morrison	"Cloncurry Cattle Song" by James Blundell	Boomerang Café by John Williamson
1990	Warragul by John Williamson	"Kimberley Moon" by James Blundell	"You've Gotta Learn to Dance" by Deniese Morrison	"Kimberley Moon" by James Blundell	Warragul by John Williamson
1991	Coming Home by Slim Dusty	"The Blue Heeler" by James Blundell	"Sarah's Memory" by Norma Murphy	"Age of Grace" by James Blundell	Two Singers, One Song by Slim Dusty & Anne Kirkpatrick
1992	Out of the Blue by Anne Kirkpatrick	"Things Are Not the Same On the Land" by Slim Dusty	"I Guess We've Been Together Too Long" by Anne Kirkpatrick	"The River" by Keith Urban	JW's Family Album by John Williamson
1993	The Outback Club by Lee Kernaghan	"Boys from the Bush" by Lee Kernaghan	"Tamworth" by Norma O'Hara Murphy	"Boys from the Bush" by Lee Kernaghan	This Road by James Blundell
1994	Three Chain Road by Lee Kernaghan	"Three Chain Road" by Lee Kernaghan	"Two Stars Fell" by Gina Jeffreys	"Three Chain Road" by Lee Kernaghan	Touch of Water by James Blundell
1995	Homeland by Graeme Connors	"Songs from the Homeland" by Graeme Connors	"Girls Night Out" by Gina Jeffreys	"Songs from the Homeland" by Graeme Connors	Three Chain Road by Lee Kernaghan
1996	1959 by Lee Kernaghan	"The Great Australian Dream" by Graeme Connors	"Didn't We Shine" by Gina Jeffreys	"End of the Road" by Troy Cassar-Daley	Mulga to Mangoes by John Williamson
1997	December Moon by Tania Kernaghan	"The Road Less Travelled" by Graeme Connors	"Where the Murray Meets the Darling" by Tania Kernaghan	"The Road Less Travelled" by Graeme Connors	1959 by Lee Kernaghan
1998	True Believer by Troy Cassar-Daley	"Living in the Circle" by Dead Ringer Band	"Dunroamin' Station" by Tania Kernaghan	"Little Things" by Troy Cassar-Daley	Pipe Dream by John Williamson
1999	Hat Town by Lee Kernaghan	"Last Man Standing" by Adam Brand	"Dancin' with Elvis" by Gina Jeffreys	"Goondiwindi Moon" by Lee Kernaghan	Hat Town by Lee Kernaghan
2000	The Captain by Kasey Chambers	"They Don't Make 'em Like That Anymore" by Troy Cassar-Daley	"The Captain" by Kasey Chambers	"They Don't Make 'em Like That Anymore" by Troy Cassar-Daley	The Way It Is by John Williamson
2001	Good Friends by Adam Brand	"Good Things in Life" by Adam Brand	"This Heart" by Beccy Cole	"Good Friends" by Adam Brand	Looking Forward Looking Back by Slim Dusty
2002	Workin' Overtime by Adam Harvey	"Not Pretty Enough" by Kasey Chambers	"Too Strong to Break" by Beccy Cole	"Shake of a Hand" by Adam Harvey	Barricades & Brickwalls by Kasey Chambers
2003	Electric Rodeo by Lee Kernaghan	"Born to Survive" by Troy Cassar-Daley	"The Story of My Life" by Melinda Schneider	"Born to Survive" by Troy Cassar-Daley	Electric Rodeo by Lee Kernaghan
2004	Beautiful Circle by Sara Storer	"Raining on the Plains" by Sara Storer	Beautiful Circle by Sara Storer	"Call It Love" by Adam Harvey	Golden Road by Keith Urban
2005	Family Tree by Melinda Schneider	"Real People" by Melinda Schneider	"Pony" by Kasey Chambers	"That's What You Call a Friend" by Adam Harvey	Wayward Angel by Kasey Chambers
2006	Chandelier of Stars by John Williamson	"Lonesome But Free" by Troy Cassar-Daley	Firefly by Sara Storer	"Lonesome But Free" by Troy Cassar-Daley	Chandelier of Stars by John Williamson
2007	The New Bush by Lee Kernaghan	"Poster Girl (Wrong Side of the World)" by Beccy Cole	"Poster Girl (Wrong Side of the World)" by Beccy Cole	The New Bush by Lee Kernaghan	The New Bush by Lee Kernaghan
2008	I'm Doin' Alright by Adam Harvey	"Land Cries Out" by Sara Storer	"Then There's Me" by Dianna Corcoran	"Everything's Going to Be Alright" by Troy Cassar-Daley	Stronger by Melinda Schneider
2009	Rattlin' Bones by Kasey Chambers and Shane Nicholson	"Rattlin' Bones" by Kasey Chambers and Shane Nicholson	"What I Did Last Night" by Catherine Britt	"Get On Down the Road" by Adam Brand	Rattlin' Bones by Kasey Chambers and Shane Nicholson
2010	I Love This Place by Troy Cassar-Daley	"Big Big Love" by Troy Cassar-Daley	"Roller Coaster" by Felicity Urquhart	I Love This Place by Troy Cassar-Daley	Defying Gravity by Keith Urban
2011	Still Walking by Graeme Connors	"Little Bird" by Kasey Chambers	"Little Bird" by Kasey Chambers	A Good Life by Graeme Connors	Planet Country by Lee Kernaghan
2012	Falling Into Place by Adam Harvey	"Bad Machines" by Shane Nicholson	"Waitress" by Beccy Cole	"Long Hot Summer" by Keith Urban	Get Closer by Keith Urban
2013	Home by Troy Cassar-Daley	"Home" by Troy Cassar-Daley	"Charlestown Road" by Catherine Britt	Home by Troy Cassar-Daley	Home by Troy Cassar-Daley
2014	Lovegrass by Sara Storer	"Lady of the Land" by Luke O'Shea	Lovegrass by Sara Storer	"Flying With the King" by Lee Kernaghan	Beautiful Noise by Lee Kernaghan
2015	Bittersweet by Kasey Chambers	"Three Brothers (The Great War)" by Luke O'Shea	"Superheroes" by Amber Lawrence	Sing You You by Luke O'Shea	
2016	Freedom Ride by Troy Cassar-Daley	"Freedom Ride" by Troy Cassar-Daley	Boneshaker by Amber Lawrence	Freedom Ride by Troy Cassar-Daley	Spirit of the Anzacs by Lee Kernaghan
2017	Things I Carry Around by Troy Cassar-Daley	"Call Me Crazy" by Travis Collins	Silos by Sara Storer	Hard Light by Travis Collins	Ripcord by Keith Urban
2018	Endless by The McClymonts	"Our Backyard" by Travis Collins & Amber Lawrence	More Than Meets the Eye by Aleyce Simmonds	Love and Blood by Shane Nicholson	The 25th Anniversary Album by Lee Kernaghan
2019	Country Heart by The Wolfe Brothers	"Ain't Seen It Yet" by The Wolfe Brothers	Lioness by Beccy Cole	Brave & The Broken by Travis Collins	Graffiti U by Keith Urban
2020	Frozen Rabbits by Felicity Urquhart	"Chain of Joy" by Felicity Urquhart	Frozen Rabbits by Felicity Urquhart	Things That We Drink To by Morgan Evans	Backroad Nation by Lee Kernaghan
2021	Fallow by Fanny Lumsden	"The High Price of Surviving" by Shane Nicholson	Fallow by Fanny Lumsden	Wreck Me by Travis Collins	The Speed of Now Part 1 by Keith Urban
2022	Living in Colour by Shane Nicholson	"And You Will Have Your Way" by Shane Nicholson	Ashleigh Dallas	Troy Cassar-Daley	The World Today by Troy Cassar-Daley
2023	Light It Up by Casey Barnes	"Star of the Show" by Brooke McClymont & Adam Eckersley	Amber Lawrence	Andrew Swift	Light It Up by Casey Barnes
2024	Livin' the Dream by The Wolfe Brothers	"Size Up" by Felicity Urquhart & Josh Cunningham	Kaylee Bell	Brad Cox	Acres by Brad Cox
2025	Between the Fires by Troy Cassar-Daley	"Some Days" (Troy Cassar-Daley & Kevin Bennett)	Max Jackson	Troy Cassar-Daley	High by Keith Urban
2026	Australia Made by The Wolfe Brothers	"The Divorce Song" (Kasey Chambers & Shane Nicholson)	Max Jackson	Wade Forster	Where You'll Find Me by James Johnston
