= Lights on the Hill (album) =

Studio album by Slim Dusty
- Released: August 1975
- Genre: Country
- Length: 37:34
- Label: EMI Music

Slim Dusty chronology
The Best of Slim Dusty Volume 2 (1975)	Lights on the Hill (1975)	Way Out There (1975)

Lights on the Hill is a studio album released by Australian country music singer Slim Dusty in August 1975. The album peaked at number 45 on the Kent Music Report and was certified 5× gold in 20 weeks of release.

The album won Album of the Year at the 1976 Country Music Awards of Australia.

== Track listing ==
LP/Cassette

Side A
No.	Title	Writer(s)	Length
1.	"Pushin' Time"	Slim Dusty, Tony Brooks	2:50
2.	"The Home Run"	Dusty	3:14
3.	"The Worst in the World"	Joy McKean	2:15
4.	"Foggy Mirrors"	Kelly Dixon, Dusty	3:22
5.	"Ridin' This Road"	McKean	2:46
6.	"Interstater"	Paul & Colleen Trenwith	3:25

Side B
No.	Title	Writer(s)	Length
1.	"Lights on the Hill" (new version)	McKean	3:02
2.	"Bent-Axle Bob"	Dixon, Dusty	2:44
3.	"There Lies a Workhorse"	Dixon, Dusty	2:29
4.	"Truckin's in My Blood"	Dusty, Brooks	3:07
5.	"A Truckie's Last Will and Testament"	Dusty	5:18
6.	"Hear 'Em Go"	Dixon, Dusty	3:02

== Weekly charts ==
Chart (1975)	Peak position
Australia (Kent Music Report) Albums Chart	45

== Certifications ==
Region	Certification	Certified units/sales
Australia (ARIA)	5× Gold	100,000^{^}
^{^} Shipments figures based on certification alone.

== Release history ==
Region	Date	Format	Edition(s)	Label	Catalogue
Australia	August 1975	LP	Standard	Columbia Records, EMI Music	SCXA 8028
