= Crosby Sisters =

Australian Country Music Duo

- Origin: Tamworth, New South Wales
- Genres: Country, Australian roots music
- Years active: 1985–present
- Members: Kelly Crosby; Jodie Crosby

The Crosby Sisters are an Australian country music duo consisting of Jodie and Kelly Crosby.

In 2001, the sisters won Vocal Group or Duo of the Year at the Country Music Awards of Australia.

== Music career ==
Both Sisters moved to Tamworth, New South Wales in 1986.

In 1991 and 1997, the sisters won Duo of the Year at the Victorian Country Music Awards. Also Winning the CMAA Achiever Awards 'Independent Entertainers of the Year' in 2000.

In 1999, the sisters imprinted their hands into the Country Music Hands of Fame 1999.

Jodie Crosby married journalist Jon Wolfe in March 2006. They have one son together, Ethan Crosby-Wolfe (born 10 March 1994), who is also a singer/songwriter, actor and performer.

In late 2010, Jodie & Jon had success hosting Tamworth's morning program "The Pulse", weekday's on 88.9FM Tamworth.

In 2013, The Crosby Sisters teamed up with Brent Larkham and recorded their Album Home Spun. Both sisters are currently working on original music for the first time since their award-winning Train of Desperation in the mid-1990s.

In November 2016, Jodie Crosby commenced work on her debut solo album. Her debut single, "Hello" was released early February 2017. Written by her son Ethan Crosby-Wolfe. The album titled Jodie Crosby was released during the 2017 Tamworth Country Music Festival.

== Discography ==
=== Albums ===
List of studio albums
Title	Details
Coming on Strong	Released: 1997
Angel	Released: 1999
Home Spun	Released: 2013

=== Extended plays ===
List of EPs
Title	Details
1995: The EP	Released: 1995

== Awards ==
=== Country Music Awards of Australia ===
The Country Music Awards of Australia (CMAA) (also known as the Golden Guitar Awards) is an annual awards night held in January during the Tamworth Country Music Festival, celebrating recording excellence in the Australian country music industry. They have been held annually since 1973.

Year	Nominee / work	Award	Result (wins only)
2001	Crosby Sisters - "Trouble in the Fields"	Vocal Group or Duo of the Year	Won

=== Tamworth Songwriters Awards ===
The Tamworth Songwriters Association (TSA) is an annual songwriting contest for original country songs, awarded in January at the Tamworth Country Music Festival. They commenced in 1986.

Year	Nominee / work	Award	Result (wins only)
1997	"Train of Desperation" by Jodie and Kelly Crosby	New Songwriter Award	Won
