= Ray Kernaghan =

Australian music artist

Ray Kernaghan is an Australian country music artist. He is married to Pam Kernaghan and they are the parents of musicians Lee, Greg, Tania and Fiona Kernaghan.

Kernaghan has twelve gold and two platinum records. He was inducted into the Australian Country Music Hands of Fame in 1995. In 2015, Kernaghan was inducted into the Australian Roll of Renown.

At one time Kernaghan owned the world's fastest truck Waltzing Matilda.

== Discography ==
=== Studio albums ===
List of albums, with selected chart positions
| Title | Album details | Peak chart positions |
| Title | Album details | AUS |
|---|---|---|
| Me & Louie On the Road | Released: 1977; Format: LP; Label: Bullet (BLT/12-002) | - |
| Jet Set Country | Released: 1978; Format: LP; Label: Bullet (BLT-12-004) | 96 |
| Remember Me (I'm The One Who Loves You) | Released: 1979; Format: LP; Label: Bullet (BLT-12-007) | - |
| Ray Kernaghan Country | Released: 1981; Format: LP; Label: Telmak (TMAK 031) | 96 |
| Family Tradition (with Lee Kernaghan) | Released: 1985; Format: LP; Label: KCR (KCR 009) | - |

== Awards and honours ==
=== Australian Roll of Renown ===
The Australian Roll of Renown honours Australian and New Zealander musicians who have shaped the music industry by making a significant and lasting contribution to Country Music. It was inaugurated in 1976 and the inductee is announced at the Country Music Awards of Australia in Tamworth in January.

| Year | Nominee / work | Award | Result |
|---|---|---|---|
| 2015 | Ray Kernaghan | Australian Roll of Renown | inductee |
