= Andrew Swift (singer) =

Australian country music singer

- Born: Australia
- Genre: Country
- Website: Andrew Swift official website

Andrew Swift is an Australian country music singer and songwriter. In 2017, Swift was a finalist in the Toyota Starmaker. Swift won two awards at the 2019 Golden guitar awards at the Country Music Awards of Australia.

== Career ==
Swift began playing in a band called Race the Frey, which was a Melbourne indie/pop-punk band. He later fronted, Andrew Swift & The Rattlesnake Choir.

In 2015, Swift self-released his pop-rock solo self-titled album.

In January 2017, Swift was named a grand finalist in the Toyota Starmaker competition.

In 2017, Swift signed to indie label Social Family Records and released the album Call Out for the Cavalry in March 2018, which hit number one on the ARIA Country Albums Chart.

At the 2019 Country Music Awards of Australia, Swift won Qantas New Talent of the Year and Alternative Country Album of the Year.

In November 2019, Swift was named the official Ambassador for the iconic Dog on the Tuckerbox at Gundagai.

In June 2020, he signed to ABC Music. The first single under the new label agreement was "Never Meant to Break Your Heart", released in June 2020.

In March 2021, Swift announced his third studio album The Art of Letting Go, which was released on 11 June 2021.

Swift was nominated for two 2022 Golden Guitar Awards - Male Artist of The Year and Alternative Country Album of The Year.

Swift released his fourth studio album, Lightning Strikes and Neon Nights, on 28 April 2023.

== Discography ==
=== Studio albums ===
List of studio albums
Title	Album details	Peak chart positions	
Title	Album details	AUS	AUS Country
Andrew Swift	Released: September 2015; Label: Andrew Swift; Formats: CD, digital download, streaming	—	—
Call Out for the Cavalry	Released: March 2018; Label: Social Family Records (SFR0065); Formats: CD, digital download, streaming	—	1
The Art of Letting Go	Released: 11 June 2021; Label: ABC Music (3572583); Formats: CD, digital download, LP, streaming	25	2
Lightning Strikes and Neon Nights	Released: 28 April 2023; Label: ABC Music (ABCASA23); Formats: CD, digital download, LP, streaming	71	10
Lucky Stars	Released: 17 October 2025; Label: ABC Music; Formats: CD, digital download, LP, streaming	33	1

== Awards ==
=== AIR Awards ===
The Australian Independent Record Awards (commonly known informally as AIR Awards) is an annual awards night to recognise, promote and celebrate the success of Australia's Independent Music sector.

Year	Nominee / work	Award	Result	Ref.
2022	The Art of Letting Go	Best Independent Country Album or EP	Nominated	

=== Country Music Awards of Australia ===
The Country Music Awards of Australia is an annual awards night held in January during the Tamworth Country Music Festival. Celebrating recording excellence in the Australian country music industry. They commenced in 1973.

Year	Nominee / work	Award	Result	Ref.
2019	Call Out for the Cavalry	Alt. Country Album of the Year	Won	
2019	Andrew Swift	Qantas Best New Talent	Won	
2019	Andrew Swift	Male Artist of the Year	Nominated	
2019	"Fire & Ice" (with Catherine Britt)	Vocal Collaboration of the Year	Nominated	
2020	"Second Hand" (with Gretta Ziller)	Vocal Collaboration of the Year	Nominated	
2022	Andrew Swift	Male Artist of the Year	Nominated	
2022	The Art of Letting Go	Alternative Country Album of The Year	Nominated	
2023	Andrew Swift	Male Artist of the Year	Won	
2024	Andrew Swift	Male Artist of the Year	Nominated	
2025	"Fumes & Fireworks" (with Amber Lawrence)	Vocal Collaboration of the Year	Nominated	
2026	Andrew Swift	Male Artist of the Year	Nominated	
2027	"Brick By Brick"	Bluegrass Recording of the Year	Pending	
