= Deniese Morrison =

Australian country singer-songwriter

- Genres: country
- Occupations: Singer, musician, songwriter
- Instrument: Vocals

Deniese Morrison is an Australian country singer-songwriter.

== Biography ==
Deniese was born in Tamworth, New South Wales and raised in Kootingal. At the age of 10, she was invited on the stage at Kootingal Town Hall to sing at a Johnny Ashcroft concert. At the age of 13, she started performing with the Geoff Brown Showband.

At the age of 16, she won the female vocal section of the Capital Country Music Association’s Jamboree, (which was the forerunner to the Golden Guitar Awards and the Tamworth Country Music Festival).

In 1973 Morrison was signed to Fable records and released her debut single "No Charge". Morrison said "Signed a contract with Fable Records and released my first single "No Charge", produced by Doug Trevor. Molly Meldrum wrote in TV Week that "No Charge" was the worst record he'd heard all year, but it made the charts of the day and I was pretty chuffed about that!". Morrison released her debut album in 1974.

In 1975, Morrison performed at the Sydney Opera House, followed by a command concert performance for then Prime Minister, Malcolm Fraser in Canberra. After recording some songs, Morrison moved on to become a resident singer/compere 6 nights a week at Wrestpoint Casino in Hobart.

== Discography ==
=== Albums ===
==== Studio albums ====
| Title | Album details |
|---|---|
| Denise Morrison | Released: 1974; Format: LP; Label: Fable (FBSA-050) |
| Sequins & Satins & Buckles & Britches (with Wayne Horsburgh) | Released: 1984; Format: LP, cassette |
| Collections | Released: 1988; Format: LP, Cassette; Label: Country City Music (CCE 006) |
| Unfinished Business | Released: 1989; Format: LP, Cassette, CD; Label: Country City Music (CCE 009) |
| On the Move | Released: 1991; Format: Cassette, CD; Label: BP (DMBP 001) |

==== Compilation albums ====
| Title | Album details |
|---|---|
| Since I Found You | Released: 1991; Format: CD; Label: J&B Records (JB445) |

=== Charting singles ===
List of singles
| Title | Year | Peak chart positions |
| Title | Year | AUS |
|---|---|---|
| "No Charge" | 1973 | 58 |

== Awards ==
=== Country Music Awards of Australia ===
The Country Music Awards of Australia (CMAA) (also known as the Golden Guitar Awards) is an annual awards night held in January during the Tamworth Country Music Festival, celebrating recording excellence in the Australian country music industry. They have been held annually since 1973.

| Year | Nominee / work | Award | Result (wins only) |
|---|---|---|---|
| 1987 | "Now I'm Easy" | Female Vocalist of the Year | Won |
| 1989 | "Battle Hymn Of Love" | Female Vocalist of the Year | Won |
| 1990 | "You've Gotta Learn to Dance" | Female Vocalist of the Year | Won |

=== Mo Awards ===
The Australian Entertainment Mo Awards (commonly known informally as the Mo Awards), were annual Australian entertainment industry awards. They recognise achievements in live entertainment in Australia from 1975 to 2016. Deniese Morrison won one award in that time.

| Year | Nominee / work | Award | Result (wins only) |
|---|---|---|---|
| 1989 | Deniese Morrison | Female Country Entertainer of the Year | Won |
