= The Very Best of Slim Dusty =

Greatest hits album by Slim Dusty
- Released: 1998
- Genre: Country music
- Length: 76:15 (2003 edition)
- Labels: Slim Dusty Enterprises, EMI Music

Slim Dusty chronology
Down the Dusty Road (1998)	The Very Best of Slim Dusty (1998)	West of Winton (1999)

The Very Best of Slim Dusty is a greatest hits album by Australian country recording artist Slim Dusty. In 2014, the album was certified 5× platinum.

In October 2010, the album was listed at number 24 on the 100 Best Australian Albums of the past 50 years.

In July 2018, the album achieved a milestone of 1000 weeks in the ARIA Country Albums Chart. Dusty is the first artist to ever achieve this milestone. Dan Rosen, Chief Executive of ARIA said, “ARIA would like to congratulate the late ARIA Hall Of Famer Slim Dusty on this amazing achievement. To see an artist reach this milestone is a testament to the King of Country's enduring appeal and incredible artistry.”

== Reception ==
Professional ratings
Review scores
Source	Rating
AllMusic	4.5/5 stars

Adrian Zupp from AllMusic said "The Very Best of Slim Dusty does an admirable job, considering the vast wealth of material available to draw from" adding "The melodies are sometimes sweet, sometimes salty, and the language is that of the 'everyman'."

== Track listing ==
No.	Title	Writer(s)	Length
1.	"Looking Forward Looking Back"	Don Walker	3:03
2.	"A Pub With No Beer"		2:55
3.	"Lights on the Hill"	Joy McKean	3:02
4.	"The Biggest Disappointment"	McKean	3:00
5.	"Three Rivers Hotel"	Stan Coster	3:23
6.	"Ringer from the Top End"	McKean	2:27
7.	"Where Country Is"	Moyses	3:47
8.	"Leave Him in the Long Yard"	Kelly Dixon, Marion Dixon, Slim Dusty	2:50
9.	"Plains of Peppimenarti"	Dusty	3:10
10.	"Duncan"		2:35
11.	"Charleville"	Don Walker	3:00
12.	"Indian Pacific"	McKean	3:25
13.	"Sweeney" (live)	Dusty, Henry Lawson, Neil McBeath	3:14
14.	"G'day G'day"	Fairbairn	3:08
15.	"Walk a Country Mile"	McKean	2:43
16.	"When the Rain Tumbles Down in July"	Dusty	2:41
17.	"I'm Going Back Again to Yarrawonga" (live)	Carlton McBeath, Pat Alexander	1:31
18.	"Old Time Country Halls" (with Joy McKean and Anne Kirkpatrick)	Dusty	2:32
19.	"Camooweal"	"Mack" Cormack, Dusty	4:11
20.	"We've Done Us Proud"	Graeme Connors	4:31
21.	"Country Revival"		2:18
22.	"Cunnamulla Fella"		2:12
23.	"By a Fire of Gidgee Coal"		2:59
24.	"Losin' My Blues Tonight"		3:20
25.	"Waltzing Matilda"		3:26

- The 1998 had 24 tracks and did not include "Looking Forward, Looking Back". This track was added as track one in 2003, pushing all other tracks to be number lower than the original pressing.

== Charts ==
=== Weekly charts ===
Chart (1998–13)	Peak position
Australian Albums (ARIA)	15

=== Year-end charts ===
Chart (2002)	Position
Australian Country (ARIA)	20
Chart (2003)	Position
Australian Country (ARIA)	4
Chart (2004)	Position
Australian Country (ARIA)	5
Chart (2005)	Position
Australian Country (ARIA)	9
Chart (2006)	Position
Australian Country (ARIA)	19
Chart (2007)	Position
Australian Country (ARIA)	41
Chart (2008)	Position
Australian Country (ARIA)	43
Chart (2009)	Position
Australian Country (ARIA)	29
Chart (2010)	Position
Australian Country (ARIA)	45
Chart (2011)	Position
Australian Country (ARIA)	20
Chart (2012)	Position
Australian Country (ARIA)	23
Chart (2013)	Position
Australian Country (ARIA)	8
Australian artist (ARIA)	38
Chart (2014)	Position
Australian Country (ARIA)	13
Chart (2015)	Position
Australian Country (ARIA)	11
Chart (2016)	Position
Australian Country (ARIA)	10
Chart (2017)	Position
Australian Country (ARIA)	18
Chart (2018)	Position
Australian Country (ARIA)	10
Chart (2019)	Position
Australian Country (ARIA)	16
Chart (2020)	Position
Australian Country (ARIA)	17
Chart (2021)	Position
Australian Country (ARIA)	22
Chart (2022)	Position
Australian Country (ARIA)	30
Chart (2024)	Position
Australian Country (ARIA)	78

== Certifications ==
Region	Certification	Certified units/sales
Australia (ARIA)	5× Platinum	350,000^{^}
^{^} Shipments figures based on certification alone.

== Release history ==
Region	Date	Format	Edition(s)	Label	Catalogue
Australia	November 1998	CD	Standard	Slim Dusty Enterprises, EMI Music	724349572829
Australia	September 2003	CD / DVD	CD / DVD	Capitol Records	724358423525
Australia	2013	CD / DVD; digital download	CD / DVD	EMI	3743287
