= Australiana (album) =

Studio album by Slim Dusty
- Released: August 1974
- Genre: Country
- Label: EMI Music
- Producer: Peter Dawkins

Slim Dusty chronology
Tall Stories and Sad Songs (1973)	Australiana (1974)	Dinki Di Aussies (1974)

Australiana is a studio album released by Australian country music singer Slim Dusty in August 1974. The album peaked at number 96 on the Kent Music Report.

The album won Album of the Year at the 1975 Country Music Awards of Australia.

== Track listing ==
LP/Cassette

Side A
No.	Title	Writer(s)	Length
1.	"Grandfather Johnson"	Joy McKean	4:18
2.	"Clancy of the Overflow"	A. B. Paterson, Slim Dusty	3:10
3.	"The Lame Fiddler"	E. Harrington, Dusty	4:27
4.	"A Squatters Prayer"	Tom Oliver, Dusty	2:54
5.	"Henry Lawson"	Stan Coster	2:54
6.	"Drought Time"	Mack Cormack, Dusty	3:57

Side B
No.	Title	Writer(s)	Length
1.	"Stick It to Him, Bluey"	Margaret White, Dusty	2:20
2.	"Written Afterwards"	Henry Lawson, Dusty	3:04
3.	"The Bequest"	Oliver, Dusty	3:09
4.	"The Pubs Still Make a Quid"	Bryan Clark, Dusty	3:09
5.	"A Drover's Run"	Wally Dowling, Dusty	2:56
6.	"Last of the Breed"	Coster	2:57

== Weekly charts ==
Chart (1974)	Peak position
Australia (Kent Music Report) Albums Chart	96

== Release history ==
Region	Date	Format	Label	Catalogue
Australia	August 1974	LP	Columbia Records, EMI Music	SCXA 8018
Australia	1996	CD	EMI	7801592
