= Backroad Nation =

Studio album by Lee Kernaghan
- Released: 10 May 2019
- Genre: Country
- Length: 37:58
- Label: ABC Music
- Producer: Lindsay Rimes

Lee Kernaghan chronology
The 25th Anniversary Album (2017)	Backroad Nation (2019)	The Very Best of Lee Kernaghan: Three Decades of Hits (2022)

Singles from Backroad Nation
- 1. "Backroad Nation" Released: May 2019

Backroad Nation is the fifteenth studio album by Australian country singer Lee Kernaghan. It was released digitally and physically in Australia on 10 May 2019 through ABC Music/Universal Music Australia. The album peaked at number 3 on the ARIA Charts.

Kernaghan describes the album as "a celebration of us, our way of life and the people who make our country great. Much of the inspiration for the songs has come from the people I've met and the places I've travelled to from Alice Springs to the Deni Ute Muster, from the mighty Pilbara region in WA to backroads QLD and everywhere in between."

At the Country Music Awards of Australia of 2020, the album won Top Selling Album of the Year. At the ARIA Music Awards of 2019, the album was nominated for ARIA Award for Best Country Album. At the AIR Awards of 2020, the album was nominated for Best Independent Country Album.

== Track listing ==
1. "Backroad Nation"
2. "Waiting on a Mate"
3. "Take It Down a Backroad"
4. "Round Here"
5. "Watching Lightning"
6. "Where I Wanna Be" (with Robby x)
7. "Live to Ride"
8. "Let There Be Cowgirls"
9. "The Trucks Came Through"
10. "Wheels"
11. "Keep On Truckin'"
12. "Till It Ends" (with The Wolfe Brothers)

== Charts ==
=== Weekly charts ===
Weekly chart performance for Backroad Nation
Chart (2019)	Peak position
Australian Albums (ARIA)	3
Australian Country Albums (ARIA)	1

=== Year-end charts ===
Year-end chart performance for Backroad Nation
Chart (2019)	Position
Australian Albums (ARIA)	86
Australian Country Albums (ARIA)	3
Chart (2020)	Position
Australian Country Albums (ARIA)	45
