= The Christmas Album (Lee Kernaghan album) =

Studio album by Lee Kernaghan
- Released: 23 November 1998
- Genre: Country, Christmas
- Label: ABC
- Producer: Garth Porter

Lee Kernaghan chronology
Hat Town (1998)	The Christmas Album (1998)	Rules of the Road (2000)

The Christmas Album is the fifth studio album (and first Christmas album) released by Australian Country Musician Lee Kernaghan. The album peaked at 31 on the ARIA Charts in December 1998.

== Track listing ==
1. "Santa Claus Is Back in Town"
2. "It Must Be Christmas"
3. "Mary's Boy Child"
4. "Merry Merry Christmas" (with Gina Jeffreys, Tania Kernaghan & Troy Dann)
5. "Christmas Waltz"
6. "Have Yourself a Merry Little Christmas"
7. "Blue Christmas"
8. "It Still Feels Like Christmastime to Me"
9. "Oh Little Town of Bethlehem" (with Robyn McKelvie)
10. "Silent Night"
11. "We Wish You a Merry Christmas"
12. "Away in a Manger"

== Charts ==
=== Weekly charts ===
Chart (1998/99)	Peak position
Australian Albums (ARIA)	31
