= Spirit of the Anzacs (album) =

Studio album by Lee Kernaghan
- Released: 13 March 2015
- Recorded: Rancom Street Studio, Sydney; 2014
- Genre: Country
- Length: 60:07
- Label: ABC Music
- Producer: Garth Porter

Lee Kernaghan chronology
Driving Home for Christmas (2014)	Spirit of the Anzacs (2015)	The 25th Anniversary Album (2017)

Singles from Spirit of the Anzacs
- 1. "Spirit of the Anzacs" Released: 22 January 2015

Spirit of the Anzacs is the thirteenth studio album by Australian country singer Lee Kernaghan. It was released digitally and physically in Australia on 13 March 2015 through ABC Music. A limited deluxe edition features four additional tracks plus a 64-page booklet that includes many of the letters, stories and images behind the songs. It is Kernaghan's first number one album in Australia and has been certified Platinum by ARIA.

== Background ==
2015 marks the 100th anniversary of the ANZAC's landing of Australian and New Zealand soldiers at Gallipoli during World War I. In honour of this landmark occasion, former Australian of the Year Kernaghan teamed up with a host of local artists and musicians to record Spirit of the Anzacs. The album was recorded at Rancom Street Studio in Sydney and Kernaghan worked with long-time producer and collaborator Garth Porter.

The project was inspired by Kernaghan's 2014 visit to the Australian War Memorial when he was shown archives of soldiers' letters to family from the front lines from World War I through to the present day.

== Track listing ==
Standard edition (Barcode: 0602547172938)

1. "For King and Country" (by George Sheppard) 0:46
2. "To the Top of the Hill" 3:46
3. "Song for Grace" (by Sara Storer) 4:37
4. "We'll Take Beersheba" 3:23
5. "Oh Passchendaele" 4:32
6. "When the First Bombs Fell" 3:32
7. "Being Your Sons" 4:05
8. "Kokoda – Only the Brave Ones" (duet with John Schumann) 4:12
9. "Teddy Sheean – Forever Eighteen" 3:29
10. "We Heard a Bugle Play" 3:01
11. "Tell Carmelita" 3:52
12. "The Unbearable Price of War" (duet with Lisa McCune) 3:13
13. "The Dust of Uruzgan" (duet with Fred Smith) 6:44
14. "I Will Always Be with You" 3:52
15. "Lest We Forget" (duet with Ben Roberts-Smith) 3:10
16. "Spirit of the Anzacs" (with Guy Sebastian, Sheppard, Jon Stevens, Jessica Mauboy, Shannon Noll & Megan Washington) 3:53

Deluxe edition (Barcode: 602547174987)

17. "As If He Knows"
18. "Changi Banjo"
19. "I Was Only 19 (A Walk in the Light Green)"
20. "The Last Post"

== Charts ==
Spirit of the Anzacs debuted at no. 2 in Australia behind Kendrick Lamar's To Pimp a Butterfly before moving to no. 1 the next week. It is Kernaghan's first no. 1 album and his first to climb in the second week on the charts. The album sold 7,421 in its first week and 14,005 in its second week. The album spent four weeks at No. 1.

Chart (2015)	Peak position
Australian Albums (ARIA)	1
Australian Artist Albums (ARIA)	1

=== Year-end charts ===
Chart (2015)	Position
Australian Albums (ARIA)	8
ARIA Country Albums Chart	1
Chart (2016)	Position
ARIA Country Albums Chart	21
Chart (2017)	Position
ARIA Country Albums Chart	61

== Certifications ==
Region	Certification	Certified units/sales
Australia (ARIA)	Platinum	70,000^{^}
^{^} Shipments figures based on certification alone.

== Arena tour ==
An 8-date national arena tour was intended to commence in Newcastle on 21 August 2015, before travelling to Brisbane, Wollongong, Sydney, Tamworth, Melbourne, Adelaide and Perth throughout September 2015. However, in April 2015 the tour was abruptly canceled due to poor ticket sales.

The arena tour would have consisted of an all-star cast of actors and singers, including Kernaghan, Lisa McCune and Jack Thompson, supported by an 11-piece band and vocal group, performing the Spirit of the Anzacs album from start to finish, as well as other classic Australian songs. Thompson would act as narrator and read letters from the Australian War Memorial archives. It was to be directed by Ignatius Jones (the creative director of Vivid Sydney and the 2010 Winter Olympics), and presented by Chugg Entertainment and Stephen White Productions. Although the tour never took place, $3 from every ticket that was sold was donated to the Soldier On and Legacy charities.

== See also ==
- List of number-one albums of 2015 (Australia)
