= 1959 (album) =

Studio album by Lee Kernaghan
- Released: July 1995
- Genre: Country
- Label: ABC Country
- Producer: Garth Porter

Lee Kernaghan chronology
Three Chain Road (1993)	1959 (1995)	Hat Town (1998)

1959 is the third studio album by Australian country musician Lee Kernaghan. It was released in July 1995 and became Kernaghan's first top ten album. It was nominated for the ARIA Award for Best Country Album at the ARIA Music Awards of 1996 and won "Album of the Year" at the 1996 Country Music Awards of Australia.

It was certified platinum in 1996.

== Track listing ==
1. "Scrubbashin'"
2. "Janine"
3. "Shake on It"
4. "Country Crowd"
5. "Doctor"
6. "Rachel's Bed"
7. "Where Country Is"
8. "Freedom Road"
9. "Skinny Dippin"
10. "This Cowboys Hat"
11. "The Rope That Pulls the Wind"
12. "1959"

== Charts ==
=== Weekly charts ===
Chart (1995–96)	Peak position
Australian Albums (ARIA)	9

=== Year-end charts ===
Chart (1995)	Peak position
Australian Albums (ARIA)	84

== Certifications ==
Region	Certification	Certified units/sales
Australia (ARIA)	Platinum	70,000^{^}
^{^} Shipments figures based on certification alone.
