= Hat Town =

Studio album by Lee Kernaghan
- Released: February 1998
- Genre: Country
- Label: ABC Country
- Producer: Garth Porter

Lee Kernaghan chronology
1959 (1995)	Hat Town (1998)	The Christmas Album (1998)

Hat Town is the fourth studio album by Australian country musician, Lee Kernaghan. It was released in February 1998 and peaked at number 7 on the ARIA charts. The album was certified platinum in 1999

Hat Town won Album of the Year at the 1999 Country Music Awards of Australia.

== Track listing ==
1. "Hat Town"
2. "Bare Essentials"
3. "Goondiwindi Moon"
4. "A Few of Us Left"
5. "When the Snow Falls On the Alice"
6. "Changi Banjo"
7. "Cowgirls Do"
8. "Gettin' Gone"
9. "Pass the Bottle 'Round"
10. "The Western Beat"
11. "Longreach"
12. "Lonelyville"

== Charts ==
=== Weekly charts ===
Chart (1998/99)	Peak position
Australian Albums (ARIA)	7

=== Year-end charts ===
Chart (1998)	Position
Australian (ARIA) Albums Chart	61
Australian Artist (ARIA) Albums Chart	10

== Certifications ==
Region	Certification	Certified units/sales
Australia (ARIA)	Platinum	70,000^{^}
^{^} Shipments figures based on certification alone.
