= Spirit of the Bush (song) =

Single by Lee Kernaghan featuring Adam Brand and Steve Forde

from the album Spirit of the Bush
- Released: July 2007
- Label: Australian Broadcasting Corporation

"Spirit of the Bush" is a song by Australian Lee Kernaghan featuring Adam Brand and Steve Forde and released as a single from Kernaghan's studio album of the same name. The song peaked at number 11 on the ARIA Charts, becoming all three artists' highest charting single.

At the 2008 Country Music Awards of Australia, the song won three awards; Vocal Collaboration of the Year, Single of the Year and Video of the Year. Additionally, at the APRA Awards of 2008, the song was nominated for Country Work of the Year.

== Track listing ==
1. "Spirit of the Bush"
2. "Leave Him in the Longford"
3. "Life Will Bring You Home"
4. "Aussie Philosophy"
- Bonus CD-ROM: "Down to Earth" documentary, and "Spirit of the Bush" video clip.

== Charts ==
Chart (2007)	Peak position
Australia (ARIA)	11

== Release history ==
Country	Date	Format	Label	Catalogue
Australia	July 2007	CD Single	Australian Broadcasting Corporation	5144222192
