= Three Chain Road =

Studio album by Lee Kernaghan
- Released: August 1993
- Recorded: 1993
- Studio: Studios 301, Sydney, New South Wales, Australia
- Genre: Country
- Label: ABC
- Producer: Garth Porter

Lee Kernaghan chronology
The Outback Club (1992)	Three Chain Road (1993)	1959 (1995)

Three Chain Road is the second studio album by Australian musical artist, Lee Kernaghan. It was released in August 1993 and peaked at number 35 in May 1994. The title refers to the road reserve width of three chains (one chain = 22 yards) of many main roads in Australia.

The album won the ARIA Award for Best Country Album at the ARIA Music Awards of 1994. It was certified double platinum in 1998.

== Track listing ==
1. "The Outback Club" – 3:23
2. "Three Chain Road" – 4:14
3. "She's My Ute" – 3:42
4. "Dust on My Boots" – 3:40
5. "The Burning Heart" – 4:03
6. "'Cause I'm Country" – 4:14
7. "Collingullie Station" – 3:46
8. "Leave Him in the Longyard" – 3:16
9. "Southern Son" – 4:01
10. "Back to the Shack" – 3:39
11. "Cobar Line" – 2:47
12. "Western Stars" – 3:12

== Personnel ==
- Lee Kernaghan - vocals

Additional musicians

- Mark Meyer - drums
- James Gillard - bass, backing vocals
- Ian Lees - bass
- Jeff McCormack - bass
- Mark Punch - electric guitar, backing vocals
- Rod McCormack - acoustic guitar, mandolin banjo, electric guitar, backing vocals
- Colin Watson - electric guitar, acoustic guitar
- Lawrie Minson - electric slide guitar, dobro, harmonica, piano accordion
- Mick Albeck - fiddle
- Michel Rose - pedal steel guitar
- Garth Porter - keyboard

== Charts ==
Chart (1993–94)	Peak position
Australian Albums (ARIA)	35

== Certifications ==
Region	Certification	Certified units/sales
Australia (ARIA)	2× Platinum	140,000^{^}
^{^} Shipments figures based on certification alone.
