= Lee Kernaghan =

Australian country music artist (born 1964)

Lee Kernaghan OAM
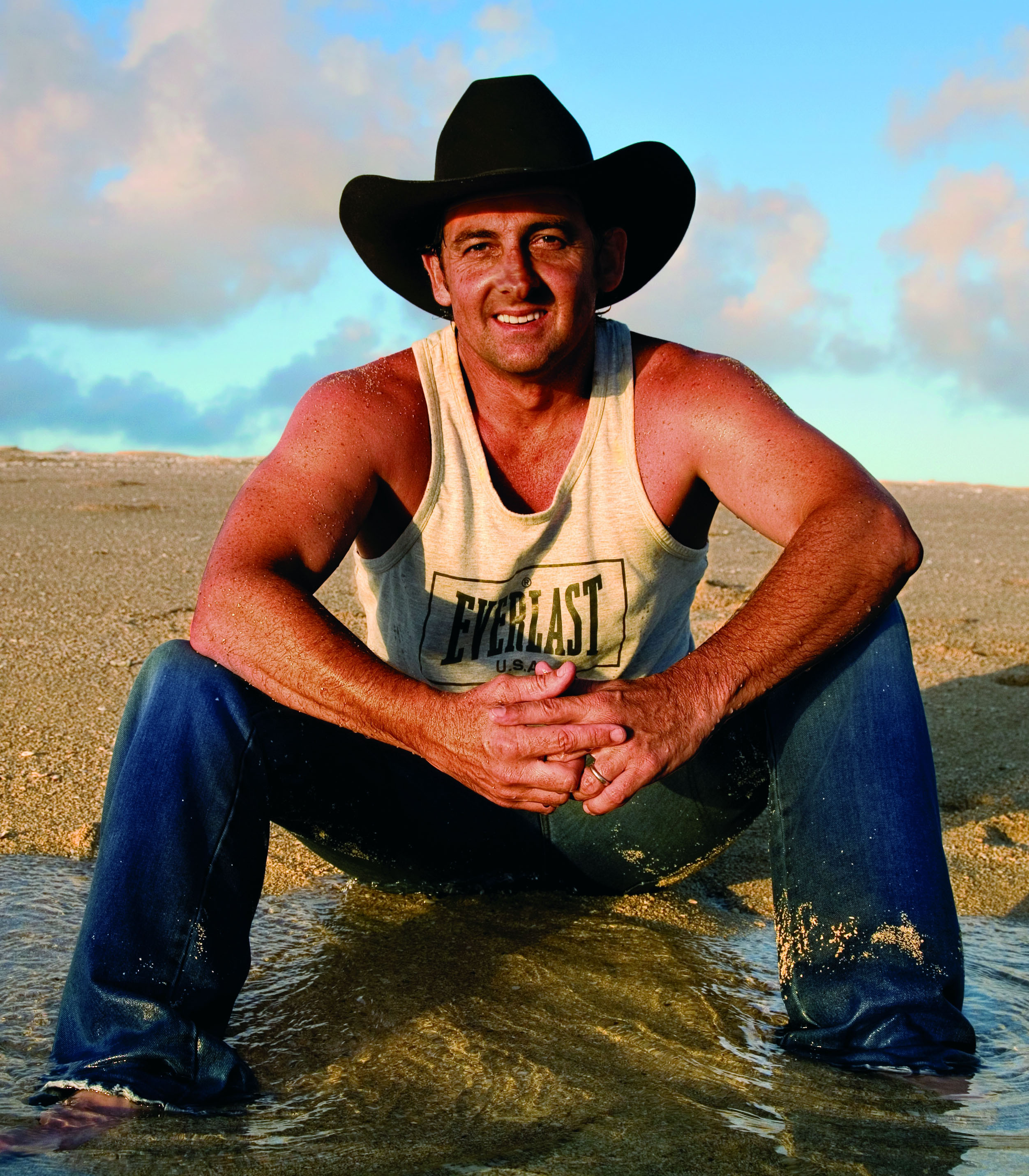

Background information
- Born: Lee Raymond Kernaghan; 15 April 1964 (age 62); Corryong, Victoria, Australia
- Genres: Country, country rock, rock, pop, country pop
- Occupations: Singer, songwriter, musician
- Instruments: Vocals, guitar
- Years active: 1977–present
- Label: ABC Music
- Website: leekernaghan.com.au

Lee Raymond Kernaghan (born 15 April 1964) is an Australian country music singer, songwriter and guitarist. Kernaghan has won four ARIA Awards and three APRA Awards, and has sold over two million albums, and as of 2021, has won 38 Golden Guitars at the Country Music Awards of Australia.

He was the 2008 Australian of the Year, in recognition of his support for rural and regional Australia. Kernaghan was the recipient of the Outstanding Achievement Award at the 2015 ARIA Awards, for Spirit of the Anzacs.

== Biography ==
=== 1965–1990: Early years ===
Lee Kernaghan was born on 15 April 1964 in Corryong, Victoria and is the son of country music singer and truck driver Ray Kernaghan. Lee spent his formative years growing up in Albury New South Wales. His grandfather was a third generation drover of sheep and cattle.

In 1986, Kernaghan traveled to the United States to represent Australia at the Nashville 'Fan Fair' country music festival.

=== 1990s ===
In 1992, Kernaghan released "Boys from the Bush" which became his first number one on the country chart. The song peaked at number 130 on the ARIA Chart. Kernaghan said "When Garth (Porter) and I first wrote 'Boys from the Bush' I had no idea it would ever be a hit. It was just a song about me and my mates, working on the land, going to the pub and tearing around in utes. I didn't think anyone would be that interested in us... we were just kids from the bush but Garth said 'this record (The Outback Club) has to be about your life and where you come from so we wrote that song and several others and before long I had a band and we were out on the road performing them live."

In May 1992, Kernaghan released The Outback Club. The album debuted at number 94 on the ARIA Charts. At the 1993 Country Music Awards of Australia (CMAA), the album won Album of the Year the ARIA Award for Best Country Album. The album re-entered the chart later peaking at number 58 in May 1994.

In August 1993, Kernaghan released his second studio album, Three Chain Road. The album again won the CMAA Album of the Year and the ARIA Award for Best Country Album.

In July 1995, Kernaghan released his third studio album, 1959, which peaked at number 9 on the ARIA Chart, becoming Kernaghan's first top ten album. The album won Kernaghan his third Album of the Year at the CMAA of 1996.

In February 1998, Kernaghan released his fourth studio album, Hat Town. The album peaked at number 7 on the ARIA Chart and won his fourth Album of the Year at the CMAA of 1999.

Kernaghan's fifth studio album was The Christmas Album in November 1998. The album peaked at number 31 on the ARIA chart.

=== 2000s ===
In January 2000, Kernaghan released his sixth studio album, Rules of the Road. This was followed by Electric Rodeo in July 2002 which won Album of the Year and Top Selling Album of the Year at the 2003 CMAA. Electric Rodeo peaked at number 5 on the ARIA chart.

Kernaghan was part of The Man from Snowy River: Arena Spectacular in 2002.

In October 2004, Kernaghan released his first greatest hits collection titled, The Big Ones: Greatest Hits Vol. 1. The album peaked at number 16 on the ARIA charts and was certified platinum.

In April 2006, Kernaghan released his eighth studio album, The New Bush. The album peaked at number 6 on the ARIA Charts and won Album of the Year and Top Selling Album of the Year at the 2007 CMAA.

In July 2007, Kernaghan released his ninth studio album, Spirit of the Bush. The album's title track peaked at number 11 on the ARIA singles chart, becoming Kernaghan's highest charting single. The song won three awards at the 2008 CMAA.

In November 2009, Kernaghan released his tenth studio album, Planet Country.

In 2009 Kernaghan was named the biggest hit-maker of the last twenty years on the Australian Country Tracks chart, beating musical greats from Australia and international.

=== 2010s ===
In September 2011, Kernaghan released his second greatest hits collection, Ultimate Hits. The album peaked at number 8 on the ARIA chart.

In October 2012, Kernaghan released his eleventh studio album, Beautiful Noise. The album peaked at number 9 on the ARIA chart.

During a visit to the Australian War Memorial (AWM) in 2013, Kernaghan's friend and AWM Director Dr. Brendan Nelson introduced Kernaghan to letters that were written by Australian service men and women during various wars dating back to the landing at Gallipoli during the First World War. These letters were held in the vaults at the AWM. The power of the letters affected Kernaghan deeply and the experience at the Australian War Memorial that day was the catalyst that saw these letters put to music in what would become the Spirit of the Anzacs (album) in March 2015. Upon release, the album peaked at number 1 on the ARIA charts, becoming Kernaghan's first chart topper. It was the highest selling Australian artist album for 2015.

2015 also saw the release of Kernaghan's first book, The Boy from the Bush, These Are My Songs, These Are My Stories.

In March 2017, Kernaghan released his fourteenth studio album, The 25th Anniversary Album. The album peaked at number 2 on the ARIA chart.

In 2019 Kernaghan released his fifteenth studio album, Backroad Nation with the title track staying four weeks at #1 on the country singles charts.

=== 2020s ===
In 2022 Kernaghan is set to celebrate his 30th anniversary as an artist. In January 2022, he released a 3-CD greatest hits collection titled The Very Best of Lee Kernaghan: Three Decades of Hits on 14 January 2022 which peaked at number 17 on the ARIA charts.

== Personal life ==
During July 2015, Kernaghan's music was played at anti-Islam rallies in Australia, without his permission. He responded that the use of his work should be "consistent with – and respectful of, the memory of ... [soldiers who] laid down their lives for the freedoms we have today." Fellow local artists, Jimmy Barnes, John Farnham and Mark Seymour, objected to the use of their material at those rallies.

Kernaghan married musician Robyn McKelvie in 1999. They have two sons, Jet and Rock.

=== Business ventures ===
For several years, Kernaghan owned the historic Great Western Hotel in Rockhampton, Queensland, after buying the pub in 2003 when it was placed into receivership after a downturn in trade and public liability concerns. Kernaghan has described the time during which he owned the Great Western Hotel as one of the greatest periods of his life.

== Discography ==
=== Studio albums ===
Title	Album details	Peak chart positions	Certifications
Title	Album details	AUS	Certifications
The Outback Club	Release date: 4 May 1992; Label: ABC Music (512 336-2)	58	ARIA: 2× Platinum
Three Chain Road	Release date: August 1993; Label: ABC Music (518 304-2)	35	ARIA: 2× Platinum
1959	Release date: July 1995; Label: ABC Music (479809-2)	9	ARIA: Platinum
Hat Town	Release date: February 1998; Label: ABC Music (493846-2)	7	ARIA: Platinum
The Christmas Album	Release date: 23 November 1998; Label: ABC Music (498040-2)	31	
Rules of the Road	Release date: January 2000; Label: ABC Music (524618-2)	16	ARIA: Gold
Electric Rodeo	Release date: July 2002; Label: ABC Music (1243-2)	5	ARIA: Platinum
The New Bush	Release date: May 2006; Label: ABC Music (5101-13104-2)	6	ARIA: Platinum
Spirit of the Bush	Release date: July 2007; Label: ABC Music (5144-21680-2)	5	ARIA: Platinum
Planet Country	Release date: November 2009; Label: ABC Music (8000288)	13	ARIA: Gold
Beautiful Noise	Release date: October 2012; Label: ABC Music (8800973)	9	ARIA: Gold
Driving Home for Christmas	Release date: November 2014; Label: ABC Music (3798306)	46	
Spirit of the Anzacs	Release date: March 2015; Label: ABC Music (8800099)	1	ARIA: Platinum
The 25th Anniversary Album	Release date: 24 March 2017; Label: ABC Music (LEE9898)	2	
Backroad Nation	Release date: 10 May 2019; Label: ABC Music (7760261)	3	

=== Collaboration albums ===
Title	Album details
Family Tradition (with Ray Kernaghan)	Release date: 1985; Label: KCR (KCR 009)

=== Live albums ===
Title	Album details	Peak chart positions
Title	Album details	AUS
Live at the Deni Ute Muster	Release date: 15 April 2022; Label: ABC (ABCC0016)	53

=== Compilation albums ===
Title	Album details	Peak chart positions	Certifications
Title	Album details	AUS	Certifications
The Big Ones: Greatest Hits Vol. 1	Release date: October 2004; Label: ABC Music (1404-2)	16	ARIA: Platinum
Ultimate Hits	Release date: October 2011; Label: ABC Music (8800919)	8	ARIA: Gold
The Very Best of Lee Kernaghan: Three Decades of Hits	Release date: 14 January 2022; Label: ABC Music (ABCC0012)	17	

=== Video albums ===
Title	Album details	Peak chart positions	Certifications
Title	Album details	AUS DVD	Certifications
Access All Areas	Release date: June 2004; Label: ABC Country (1391-9)	8	ARIA: Gold

=== Charting singles ===
Charting singles in the top 200
Title	Year	Peak chart positions	Album
Title	Year	AUS	Album
"Boys from the Bush"	1993	130	The Outback Club
"She's My Ute"	1993	156	The Outback Club
"Save This Land" (with Trisha Yearwood)	1994	105	non-album single
"Country Crowd"	1995	130	1959
"This Is the Outback"	1997	84	non-album single
"Missin' Slim" (with Colin Buchanan)	2004	49	non-album single
"Spirit of the Bush" (with Adam Brand and Steve Forde)	2007	11	Spirit of the Bush
"Beautiful Noise"	2012	187	Beautiful Noise
"Spirit of the Anzacs" (featuring Guy Sebastian, Sheppard, Jon Stevens, Jessica Mauboy, Shannon Noll and Megan Washington)	2015	32	Spirit of the Anzacs

== Awards and nominations ==
Kernaghan received the Order of Australia Medal in 2004.

In 2008, he was Australian of the Year, in recognition for his support of rural and regional Australia; his 'Pass the Hat Around' tours have raised more than a million dollars for rural communities during a challenging period of drought. He was presented with the award by Prime Minister Kevin Rudd.

=== AIR Awards ===
The Australian Independent Record Awards (commonly known informally as AIR Awards) is an annual awards night to recognise, promote and celebrate the success of Australia's Independent Music sector.

Year	Nominee / work	Award	Result
2013	Beautiful Noise	Best Independent Country Album	Nominated
2018	The 25th Anniversary Album	Best Independent Country Album	Nominated
2020	Backroad Nation	Best Independent Country Album	Nominated

=== ARIA Music Awards ===
The ARIA Music Awards is an annual awards ceremony that recognises excellence, innovation, and achievement across all genres of Australian music. Kernaghan has won two awards from 14 nominations. Plus, he received the Outstanding Achievement Award in 2015.

Year	Nominee / work	Award	Result
1993	The Outback Club	Best Country Album	Won
1994	Three Chain Road	Best Country Album	Won
1995	Country Crowd	Best Country Album	Nominated
1996	1959	Best Country Album	Nominated
2000	Rules of the Road	Best Country Album	Nominated
2002	Electric Rodeo	Best Country Album	Nominated
2006	The New Bush	Best Country Album	Nominated
2010	Planet Country	Best Country Album	Nominated
2013	Beautiful Noise	Best Country Album	Nominated
2015	Spirit of the Anzacs	Best Country Album	Nominated
2015	"Spirit of the Anzacs" (directed by Duncan Toombs)	Best Video	Nominated
2015	Garth Porter forSpirit of the Anzacs	Producer of the Year	Nominated
2015	Spirit of the Anzacs	Outstanding Achievement Award	awarded
2017	The 25th Anniversary Album	Best Country Album	Nominated
2019	Backroad Nation	Best Country Album	Nominated

=== APRA Awards ===
The APRA Awards are held in Australia and New Zealand by the Australasian Performing Right Association to recognise songwriting skills, sales and airplay performance by its members annually. Kernaghan has won four awards from nine nominations.

Year	Nominee / work	Award	Result
1993	"Boys from the Bush"	Country Song of the Year	Won
1996	"1959"	Most Performed Country Work	Won
1999	"Hat Town"	Most Performed Country Work	Won
2004	"Way It Is"	Most Performed Country Work	Nominated
2007	"New Bush"	Most Performed Country Work	Nominated
2008	"Spirit of the Bush" (featuring Adam Brand and Steve Forde)	Most Performed Country Work	Nominated
2011	"Planet Country"	Country Work of the Year	Nominated
2014	"Flying with the King"	Country Work of the Year	Won
2020	"Backroad Nation"	Most Performed Country Work of the Year	Nominated

=== Australian Roll of Renown ===
The Australian Roll of Renown honours Australian and New Zealander musicians who have shaped the music industry by making a significant and lasting contribution to Country Music. It was inaugurated in 1976 and the inductee is announced at the Country Music Awards of Australia in Tamworth in January.

Year	Nominee / work	Award	Result
2015	Lee Kernaghan	Australian Roll of Renown	inductee

=== Country Music Awards (CMAA) ===
The Country Music Awards of Australia (CMAA) (also known as the Golden Guitar Awards) is an annual awards night held in January during the Tamworth Country Music Festival, celebrating recording excellence in the Australian country music industry. They have been held annually since 1973. Kernaghan has won thirty-eight Golden Guitar awards at the Tamworth Country Music Awards of Australia.

Year	Nominee / work	Award	Result (wins only)
1993	"Boys from the Bush"	APRA Song of the Year	Won
1993	The Outback Club	Album of the Year	Won
1993	"Boys from the Bush"	Male Vocalist of the Year	Won
1994	"Three Chain Road"	APRA Song of the Year	Won
1994	Three Chain Road	Album of the Year	Won
1994	"Three Chain Road"	Male Vocalist of the Year	Won
1994	"Leave Him in the Longford" (with Slim Dusty)	Vocal Group or Duo of the Year	Won
1995	Three Chain Road	Top Selling Album of the Year	Won
1996	1959	Album of the Year	Won
1997	1959	Top Selling Album of the Year	Won
1997	"A Bushman Can't Survive" (with Tania Kernaghan)	Vocal Collaboration of the Year	Won
1999	Hat Town	Album of the Year	Won
1999	Hat Town	Top Selling Album of the Year	Won
1999	"Goondiwindi Moon"	Male Vocalist of the Year	Won
1999	"Changi Banjo"	Heritage Song of the Year	Won
1999	"Tough Job" (with Colin Buchanan)	Vocal Collaboration of the Year	Won
2003	"Thank God I'm a Country Boy" (with Josh Arnold)	Vocal Collaboration of the Year	Won
2003	Electric Rodeo	Album of the Year	Won
2003	Electric Rodeo	Top Selling Album of the Year	Won
2005	"Missin' Slim"	Heritage Song of the Year (with Colin Buchanan)	Won
2007	The New Bush	Album of the Year	Won
2007	The New Bush	Male Artist of the Year	Won
2007	The New Bush	Top Selling Album of the Year	Won
2007	"Close as a Whisper (The Gift)"	Heritage Song of the Year Close	Won
2008	"Spirit of the Bush" (with Adam Brand and Steve Forde)	Vocal Collaboration of the Year	Won
2008	"Spirit of the Bush" (with Adam Brand and Steve Forde)	Video of the Year	Won
2008	"Spirit of the Bush" (with Adam Brand and Steve Forde)	Single of the Year	Won
2011	Planet Country	Top Selling Album of the Year	Won
2012	"Channel Country Ground" (with Dean Perrett)	Ballad of the Year	Won
2014	Beautiful Noise	Top Selling Album of the Year	Won
2014	"Flying with the King"	Male Artist of the Year	Won
2014	"Flying with the King"	Single of the Year	Won
2014	"Flying with the King"	Video clip of the Year	Won
2016	"Spirit of the Anzacs" (with Guy Sebastian, Jessica Mauboy, Jon Stevens, Amy & George Sheppard, Shannon Noll and Megan Washington)	Vocal Collaboration of the Year	Won
2016	"Spirit of the Anzacs" (with Guy Sebastian, Jessica Mauboy, Jon Stevens, Amy & George Sheppard, Shannon Noll and Megan Washington)	Video clip of the Year	Won
2016	Spirit of the Anzacs	Top Selling Album of the Year	Won
2018	The 25th Anniversary Album	Top Selling Album of the Year	Won
2020	Backroad Nation	Top Selling Album of the Year	Won

=== Mo Awards ===
The Australian Entertainment Mo Awards (commonly known informally as the Mo Awards), were annual Australian entertainment industry awards. They recognise achievements in live entertainment in Australia from 1975 to 2016. Lee Kernaghan won five awards in that time.

Year	Nominee / work	Award	Result (wins only)
1992	Lee Kernaghan	Country Performer of the Year	Won
1992	Lee Kernaghan	Male Country Entertainer of the Year	Won
1993	Lee Kernaghan	Country Performer of the Year	Won
1993	Lee Kernaghan	Male Country Entertainer of the Year	Won
1994	Lee Kernaghan	Male Country Entertainer of the Year	Won

=== Music for a New Generation Awards ===
The Music For A New Generation Awards are run by the Planet Country with Big Stu & MJ radio program and celebrate crossover country artist efforts each year. The awards have featured fan voting since 2016.

Year	Nominee / work	Award	Result
2015	Himself	Australian Male Artist of The Year	Nominated
2017	Himself	Australian Male Artist of The Year	Won

=== Tamworth Songwriters Awards ===
The Tamworth Songwriters Association (TSA) is an annual songwriting contest for original country songs, awarded in January at the Tamworth Country Music Festival. They commenced in 1986. Lee Kernaghan has won three awards in that time.

Year	Nominee / work	Award	Result (wins only)
1993	"Boys from the Bush" by Lee Kernaghan and Garth Porter	Contemporary Country Song of the Year	Won
1993	"Boys from the Bush" by Lee Kernaghan and Garth Porter	Country Song of the Year	Won
1996	"1959" by Lee Kernaghan	Contemporary Country Song of the Year	Won
