= Cunnamulla Fella =

Australian country song

Single by Slim Dusty
- A-side: "A Letter From Down Under"
- Released: 1965
- Recorded: 1965
- Genre: Country
- Label: Columbia
- Songwriters: Stan Coster, Slim Dusty

"Cunnamulla Fella" (sometimes written as "Cunnamulla Feller") is an Australian country song about a fictional stockman from the Queensland town of Cunnamulla that was first recorded by Slim Dusty in 1965 and has been covered by several artists. An eponymous statue was unveiled in 2005 and is a major feature of the Cunnamulla town centre.

== Background ==
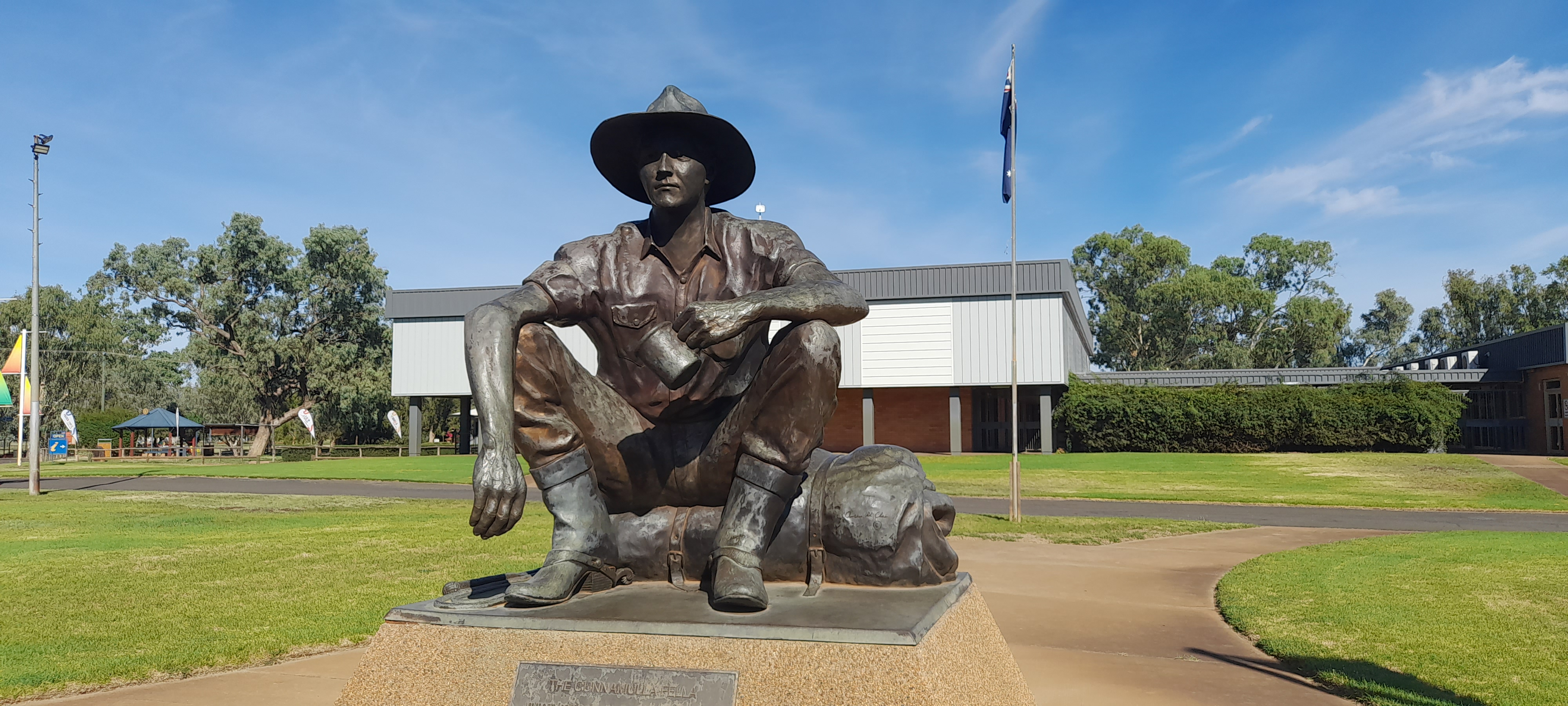
Cunnamulla Fella, Cunnamulla

The song "Cunnamulla Fella" was written by the Australian country music artist Slim Dusty in collaboration with Stan Coster. Recorded in 1965 and released in that year as the b-side to "A Letter From Down Under" (Columbia DO-4633), The song's lyrics tell the story of a nomadic and carefree stockman who roams the vast landscapes of the Outback and recall Coster's days working as a sheep-shearing "ringer" around Cunnamulla in the 1950s. The song also refers to other towns in the area besides Cunnamulla such as Adavale, Augathella, Charleville, and Dirranbandi. A live version of the song was later released in 1973 on Slim Dusty's album Live At Tamworth (1973) and the studio version appeared on compilation albums such as ''I'll Take Mine Country Style (1985), The Very Best of Slim Dusty (1998), and Pubs, Trucks & Plains (2007). It was on the soundtrack of The Slim Dusty Movie (1984).

== Covers ==
"Cunnamulla Feller"

Single by The Screaming Jets

from the album Not So Dusty
- Released: 1998
- Label: EMI
- Songwriters: Stan Coster, Slim Dusty

The Screaming Jets singles chronology
"October Grey" (1998)	"Cunnamulla Feller" (1998)	"I Need Your Love" (1999)

The song has been covered by the following artists:

- The Screaming Jets (1998) which reached No. 58 on the ARIA Top 100 Singles Chart, on the Slim Dusty tribute album Not So Dusty, .
- Lee Kernaghan on Rules of the Road (2000) and Spirit of the Bush (2007)

== Eponymous statue ==
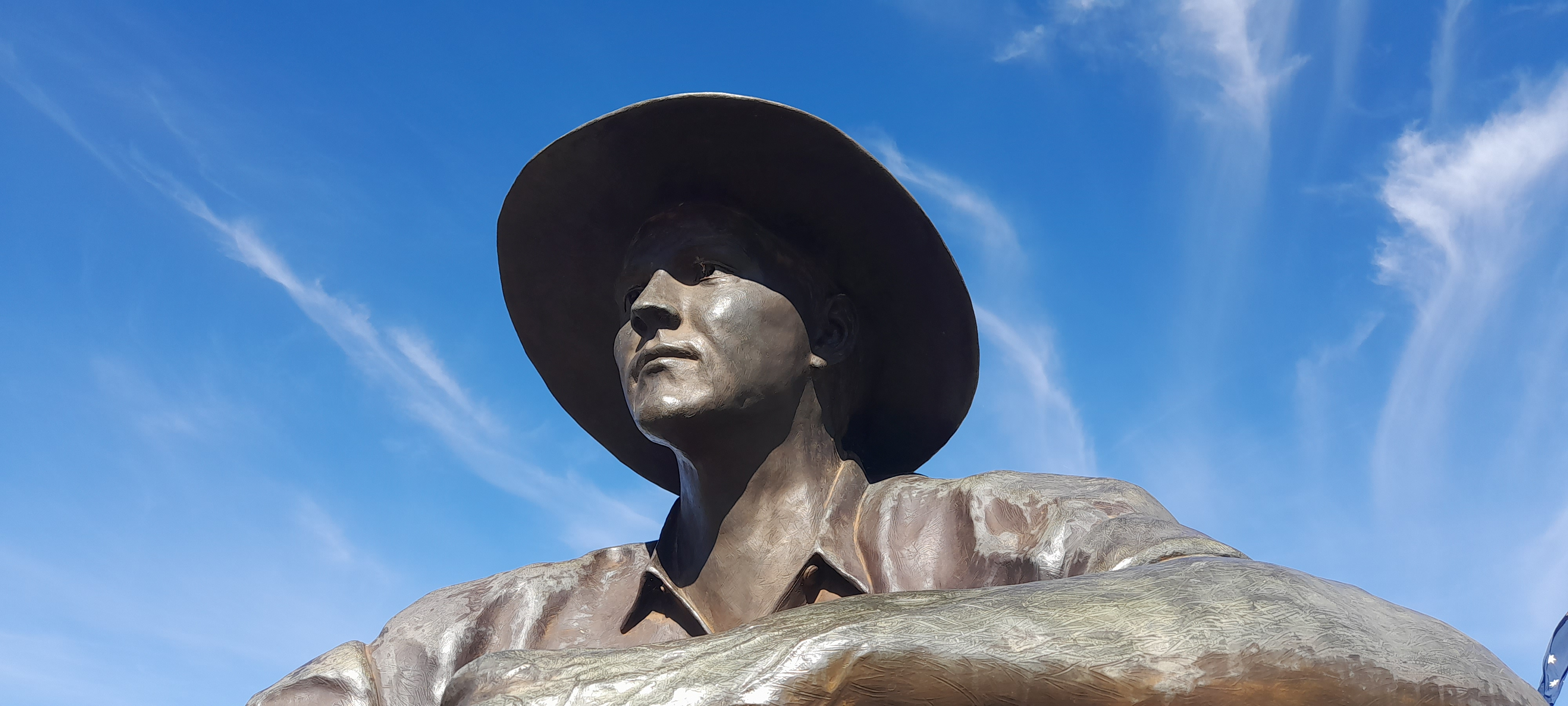
The Cunnamulla Fella staring into the distance

In honour of the enduring legacy of "The song," the Cunnamulla Fella Statue was unveiled in 2005 by country music personalities Anne Kirkpatrick (Dusty's daughter), Jayne Kelly, and Tracy and Russell Coster. That year the Cunnamulla Fella Festival was established in its honour. The statue was commissioned by the Paroo Shire Council, with the intent of celebrating the unique character of the Cunnamulla region and paying homage to Slim Dusty's contribution to Australian country music.

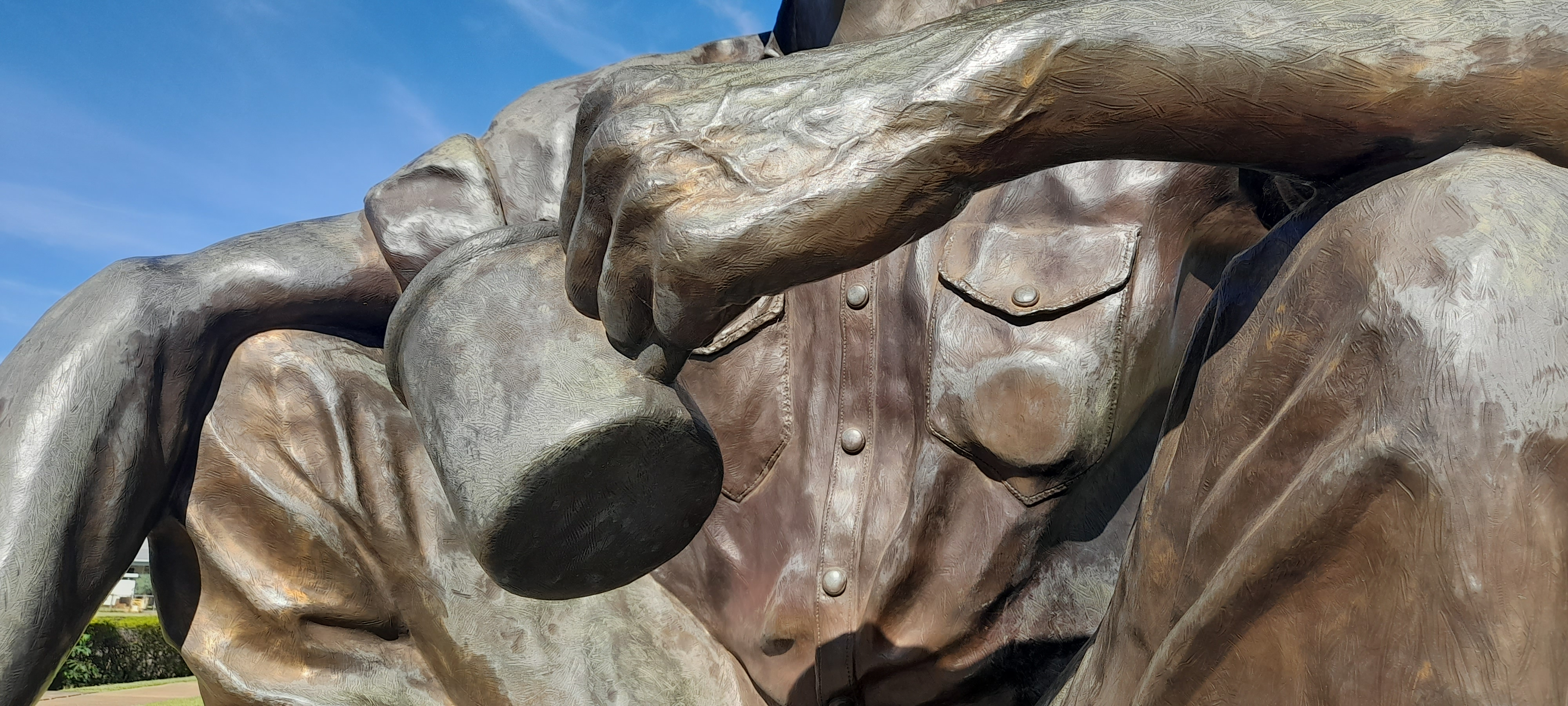
Sculpted in life-like detail

The bronze statue was created by Australian sculptor Archie St Clair, a Northern Territorian who had previously worked as a stockman. It was based on a painting by Michael Nicholas, a wildlife painter who was formerly a police officer in Cunnamulla, in response to a national competition by the local Shire of Paroo held after Dusty's death in 2003 to create a sketch of the "Cunnamulla Fella".

The Cunnamulla Fella Statue depicts a larger than life sized stockman sitting on a swag. The statue is strategically positioned in Cunnamulla's town centre in Centenary Park, offering a visual representation of the song's lyrics.
