= Planet Country =

Studio album by Lee Kernaghan
- Released: 6 November 2009
- Genre: Country
- Length: 43:51
- Label: ABC
- Producer: Garth Porter

Lee Kernaghan chronology
Spirit of the Bush (2007)	Planet Country (2009)	Ultimate Hits (2011)

Planet Country is the tenth studio album released by Australian country musician Lee Kernaghan. The album was released in November 2009 and peaked at 13 on the ARIA Charts. A limited edition featured a 10-track bonus CD titled Bringing the Music Home.

At the 2011 Country Music Awards of Australia, the album won Top Selling Album of the Year.

== Track listing ==
CD1

1. "Planet Country"
2. "Love in the Time of Drought"
3. "People Like Us"
4. "Dirt"
5. "Gold"
6. "Scars" (featuring Dierks Bentley)
7. "Something Right"
8. "Cowgirl"
9. "The Old Block"
10. "Australian Boy"
11. "Girls Gone Wild"
12. "A Place for Me" (Planet Country Reprise)
13. "I Milk Cows" (bonus track)

CD2 - Bringing the Music Home

1. "Bringing the Music Home"
2. "Fire"
3. "Feeling Pretty Naked"
4. "Kerosene Lane"
5. "My Outback World"
6. "Great Balls of Fire" (Live At CCM Rocks The Snowys)
7. "Spirit of the Bush" (Live At CCM Rocks The Snowys)
8. "Talk Of The Town"
9. "Family Tradition"
10. "Texas QLD 4385" (Live At CCM Rocks The Snowys)

== Charts ==
=== Weekly charts ===
Chart (2009–10)	Peak position
Australian Albums (ARIA)	13

=== Year-end charts ===
Chart (2009)	Position
ARIA Australian Artist Albums Chart	30
ARIA Country Albums Chart	3
Chart (2010)	Position
ARIA Country Albums Chart	8
Chart (2011)	Position
ARIA Country Albums Chart	49

== Certifications ==
Region	Certification	Certified units/sales
Australia (ARIA)	Gold	35,000^{^}
^{^} Shipments figures based on certification alone.
