= Spirit of the Anzacs =

2015 single by Lee Kernaghan

Single by Lee Kernaghan featuring Guy Sebastian, Sheppard, Jon Stevens, Jessica Mauboy, Shannon Noll and Megan Washington

from the album Spirit of the Anzacs
- Released: 22 January 2015
- Length: 3:53
- Label: Australian Broadcasting Corporation
- Songwriters: Colin Buchanan; Lee Kernaghan; Garth Porter
- Producer: Garth Porter

Lee Kernaghan singles chronology
"Turn This to Gold" (2014)	"Spirit of the Anzacs" (2015)	"The Outback Club Reunion" (2017)

Guy Sebastian singles chronology
"Linger" (2014)	"Spirit of the Anzacs" (2015)	"Tonight Again" (2015)

Sheppard singles chronology
"Smile" (2014)	"Spirit of the Anzacs" (2015)	"Let Me Down Easy" (2015)

Jon Stevens singles chronology
"Touch" (2012)	"Spirit of the Anzacs" (2015)	"Woman" (2015)

Jessica Mauboy singles chronology
"Can I Get a Moment?" (2014)	"Spirit of the Anzacs" (2015)	"The Day Before I Met You" (2015)

Shannon Noll singles chronology
"We Only Live Once" (2014)	"Spirit of the Anzacs" (2015)	"Who I Am" (2016)

Megan Washington singles chronology
"Limitless" (2014)	"Spirit of the Anzacs" (2015)	"Saint Lo" (2016)

Music video
- "Spirit of the Anzacs" on YouTube

"Spirit of the Anzacs" is the first single from Lee Kernaghan's 2015 album of the same name. The charity single features Guy Sebastian, Sheppard, Jon Stevens, Jessica Mauboy, Shannon Noll and Megan Washington. It was released on 22 January 2015 to raise funds for Legacy and Soldier On. "Spirit of the Anzacs" is the first taste of an album that has brought soldiers' letters to life in song. The project was inspired by Kernaghan's 2014 visit to the Australian War Memorial when he was shown archives of soldiers letters to family from the front lines. "Spirit of the Anzacs" is based on Paul Keating's 1993 eulogy at the interment of the Unknown Soldier.

== Music video ==
The official video was released on YouTube via ABC Music on 26 February 2015. The video shows the singers performing their parts of the song in a studio, overlapped with various pieces of war footage and photos. The Duncan Toombs directed music video was nominated for Best Video at the ARIA Music Awards of 2015.

== Charts ==
"Spirit of the Anzacs" peaked at No. 32 in Australia, giving Kernaghan his first single on the ARIA Singles Chart since his 2007 single "Spirit of the Bush" peaked at No. 11. It was No.3 on the Australian Artist Singles Chart. The song re-entered the ARIA Singles Chart at No. 38 on 3 May 2015, the sales week following ANZAC Day.

The song was played at the Reclaim Australia anti-Islam rallies in 2015.

Chart (2015)	Peak position
Australia (ARIA)	32

== Release history ==
Country	Date	Format	Label
Australia	22 January 2015	Digital download	Australian Broadcasting Corporation
