= Electric Rodeo (Lee Kernaghan album) =

Studio album by Lee Kernaghan
- Released: July 2002
- Recorded: Rancom St. Studios, Sydney, The Castle, Nashville TN, Studios 301, Sydney and The Vault, Melbourne.
- Genre: Country
- Producer: Garth Porter

Lee Kernaghan chronology
Rules of the Road (2000)	Electric Rodeo (2002)	The Big Ones: Greatest Hits Vol. 1 (2004)

Electric Rodeo is the seventh studio album released by Australian country musician Lee Kernaghan. The album was released in July 2002 and peaked at number five on the ARIA Charts. The album was certified platinum in 2003.

At the ARIA Music Awards of 2002, the album was nominated for the ARIA Award for Best Country Album.

At the 2003 Country Music Awards of Australia, the album won Album of the Year and Top Selling Album of the Year.

== Track listing ==
1. "The Way It Is"
2. "Electric Rodeo"
3. "Something in the Water"
4. "An Ordinary Bloke"
5. "Baptise the Ute"
6. "Long Night"
7. "You Rock My World"
8. "A Handful of Dust"
9. "That Old Caravan"
10. "Wild Side of Life"
11. "Sing You Back Home"
12. "Texas QLD 4385"
13. "The Odyssey"

== Charts ==
=== Weekly charts ===
Chart (2002/03)	Peak position
Australian Albums (ARIA)	5

=== Year-end charts ===
Chart (2002)	Position
ARIA Albums Chart	79
ARIA Australian Artist Albums Chart	16
ARIA Country Albums Chart	3
Chart (2003)	Position
ARIA Country Albums Chart	5

== Certifications ==
Region	Certification	Certified units/sales
Australia (ARIA)	Platinum	70,000^{^}
^{^} Shipments figures based on certification alone.
