= Big Golden Guitar =

Monument in Tamworth, New South Wales, Australia

Coordinates: 31°7′38.85″S 150°55′24.39″E

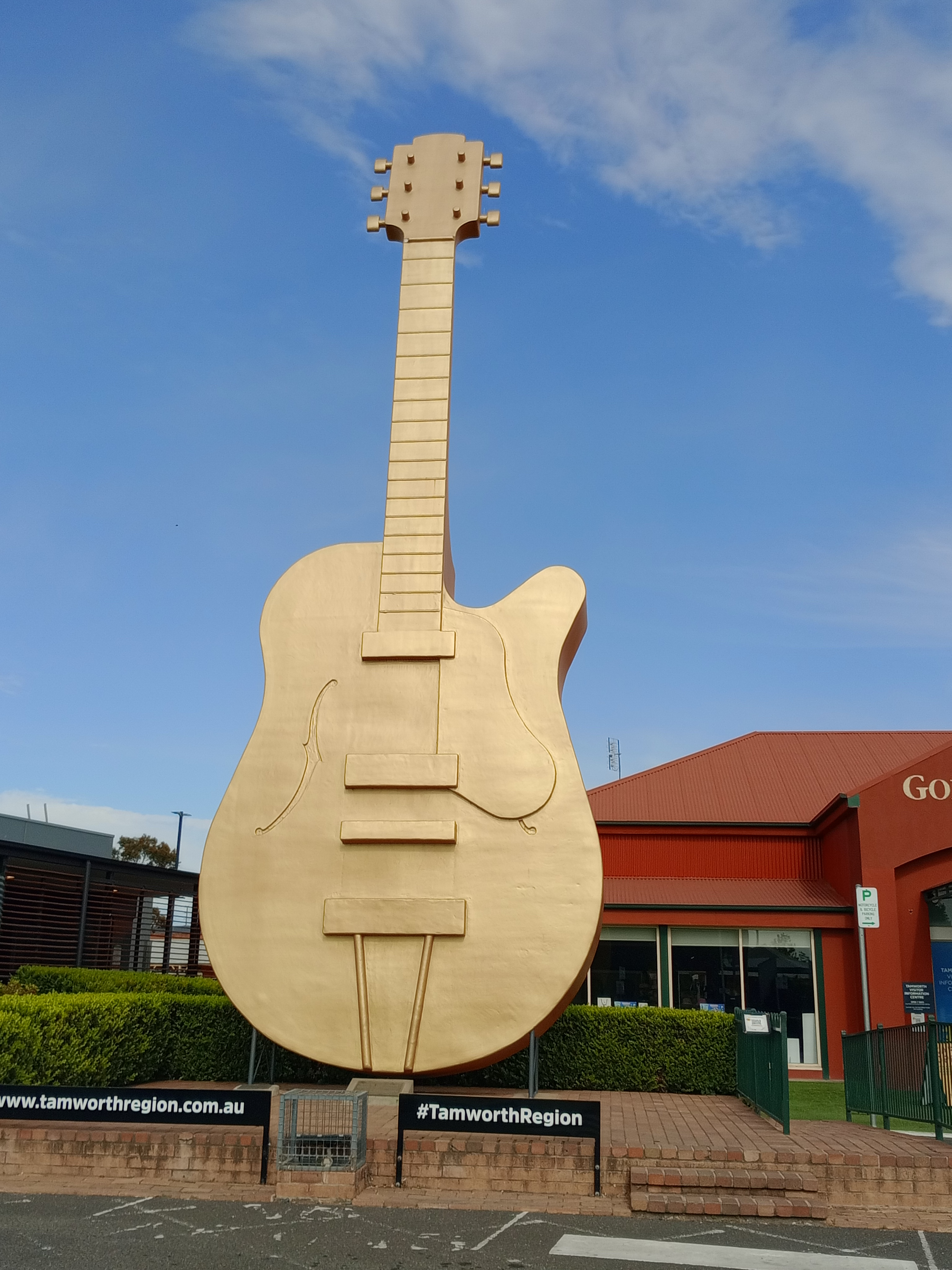
- The Golden Guitar in October 2025
- Designer: Harry Frost
- Completion date: 1988
- Medium: Fibreglass and Steel
- Subject: Australian country music
- Dimensions: 12 m (39 ft) tall
- Weight: 0.5 tonnes (0 long tons; 1 short ton)
- Location: Tamworth, New South Wales, Australia

The Big Golden Guitar is a 12 metres (39 ft) tall sculpture located in Tamworth, New South Wales. One of the many "big" attractions that can be found around Australia, the monument is one of the best-known points of interest in New England.

It is also a major attraction during the Tamworth Country Music Festival.

== History ==
The Golden Guitar was erected in front of the Longyard Hotel on Sydney Road in 1988. It was unveiled by the country music artist, Slim Dusty. Its location in Tamworth is symbolic of the city's recognition and celebration of Australian country music, and its artists.

An annual award ceremony takes place where miniature Golden Guitars are given as awards to artists and musicians in recognition of their achievements and contributions in the genre of country music. An estimated 3.6 million photographs have been taken of the site since its opening.

In 2018, the Tamworth Visitor Information Centre at the Big Golden Guitar Tourist Centre had 117,000 visitors, and the Council intends to increase visitor numbers. Recent additions to the site include the National Guitar Museum (hosting a wide collection af authentic and replica guitars of famous artists), along with a cafe for the tourists.

== Design ==
The Golden Guitar stand approximately 12 metres high and weighs over 500 kilograms. It is constructed out of fibreglass and wood, with steel reinforcements. The Golden Guitar has no strings because it was modeled directly on the Golden Guitar trophies given to winners at the Country Music Awards of Australia ceremony night during the Tamworth Country Music Festival.

== See also ==
- Australia's big things
- List of world's largest roadside attractions
