= The Outback Club =

Studio album by Lee Kernaghan
- Released: 4 May 1992
- Genre: Country

Lee Kernaghan chronology
The Outback Club (1992)	Three Chain Road (1993)

The Outback Club is the debut studio album by Australian country musician Lee Kernaghan. It won the ARIA Award for Best Country Album at the ARIA Music Awards of 1993. The album debuted at number 94, peaking at number 58 in May 1994.

The album reached Gold sales in January 1994, Platinum sales in November 1995 and Double Platinum in January 2001.

== Track listing ==
1. "Boys from the Bush" - 2:48
2. "High Country" - 3:52
3. "She Waits By the Sliprails (The Bush Girl)" - 2:54
4. "Walkin' Out West" - 3:07
5. "Country Girls" - 3:14
6. "Country's Really Big These Days" - 2:57
7. "You're the Reason I Never Saw Hank Jnr Play" - 2:53
8. "Rejected" - 2:08
9. "Scots of the Riverina" - 4:13
10. "You Don't Have to Go to Memphis" - 2:23
11. "Searchin' for Another You" - 2:49
12. "Tallarook" - 2:57

== Charts ==
Chart performance for The Outback Club
Chart (1992–1994)	Peak position
Australian Albums (ARIA)	58

== Certifications ==
Region	Certification	Certified units/sales
Australia (ARIA)	2× Platinum	140,000^{^}
^{^} Shipments figures based on certification alone.
