= Slim Dusty =

Australian country music singer-songwriter (1927–2003)

Slim Dusty AO MBE
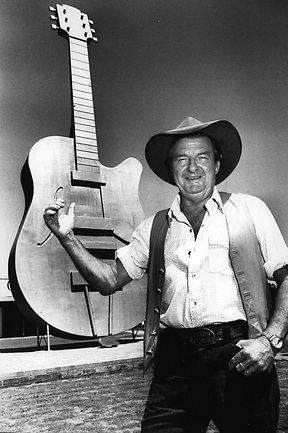
- Dusty at the Golden Guitar awards in Tamworth

Background information
- Born: David Gordon Kirkpatrick; 13 June 1927; Nulla Nulla Creek, New South Wales, Australia
- Died: 19 September 2003 (aged 76) Sydney, New South Wales, Australia
- Genres: Country; bush ballad; Australiana
- Occupations: Singer; songwriter; guitarist; music producer
- Instruments: Vocals; guitar
- Years active: 1945–2003
- Labels: Regal Zonophone; EMI
- Formerly of: Joy McKean; Anne Kirkpatrick; Smoky Dawson; Buddy Williams; The Wiggles; South Kempsey Boys; Shorty Ranger
- Spouse: Joy McKean (m. 1951)
- Website: slimdustymusic.com.au

Slim Dusty, AO MBE (born David Gordon Kirkpatrick; 13 June 1927 – 19 September 2003) was an Australian country music singer-songwriter, guitarist and producer. He was an Australian cultural icon, referred to universally as Australia's King of Country Music and one of the country's most awarded stars, with a career spanning nearly seven decades and producing numerous recordings. He recorded songs in the legacy of Australia genre, particularly of bush life, including works by renowned Australian bush poets Henry Lawson and Banjo Paterson, who represented the lifestyle. The music genre was coined the "bush ballad", a style first made popular by Buddy Williams.

Slim Dusty "released more than a hundred albums, selling more than seven million records and earning over 70 gold and platinum album certifications". He was the first Australian to have a No. 1 international hit song, with a version of Gordon Parsons's "A Pub with No Beer". He received 38 Golden Guitars and an Australian Recording Industry Association (ARIA) award. He was inducted into the ARIA Hall of Fame and Australian Roll of Renown. At the time of his death, age 76, Dusty had been working on his 106th album for EMI Records. In 2007, his domestic record sales in Australia surpassed seven million. During his lifetime, Dusty was considered an Australian National Treasure. He performed a cover of Banjo Paterson's "Waltzing Matilda" at the closing ceremony of the Sydney 2000 Olympic Games.

== Family and career ==
=== Childhood and early career ===
David Gordon Kirkpatrick was born on 13 June 1927 in Nulla Nulla Creek west of Kempsey, New South Wales, the son of a cattle farmer. His childhood home, "Homewood", survives and is now heritage-listed. He was known by his middle name, Gordon. He wrote his first song, "The Way the Cowboy Dies", in 1937 and adopted the stage name "Slim Dusty" in 1938 at age 11. His earliest musical influences included American Jimmie Rodgers, New Zealander Tex Morton, and Australia's Buddy Williams. In 1945, Dusty wrote "When the Rain Tumbles Down in July" and released his first record that year at age 18. In 1946, he signed his first recording contract with Columbia Graphophone for the Regal Zonophone label.

=== Influential wife, and children ===
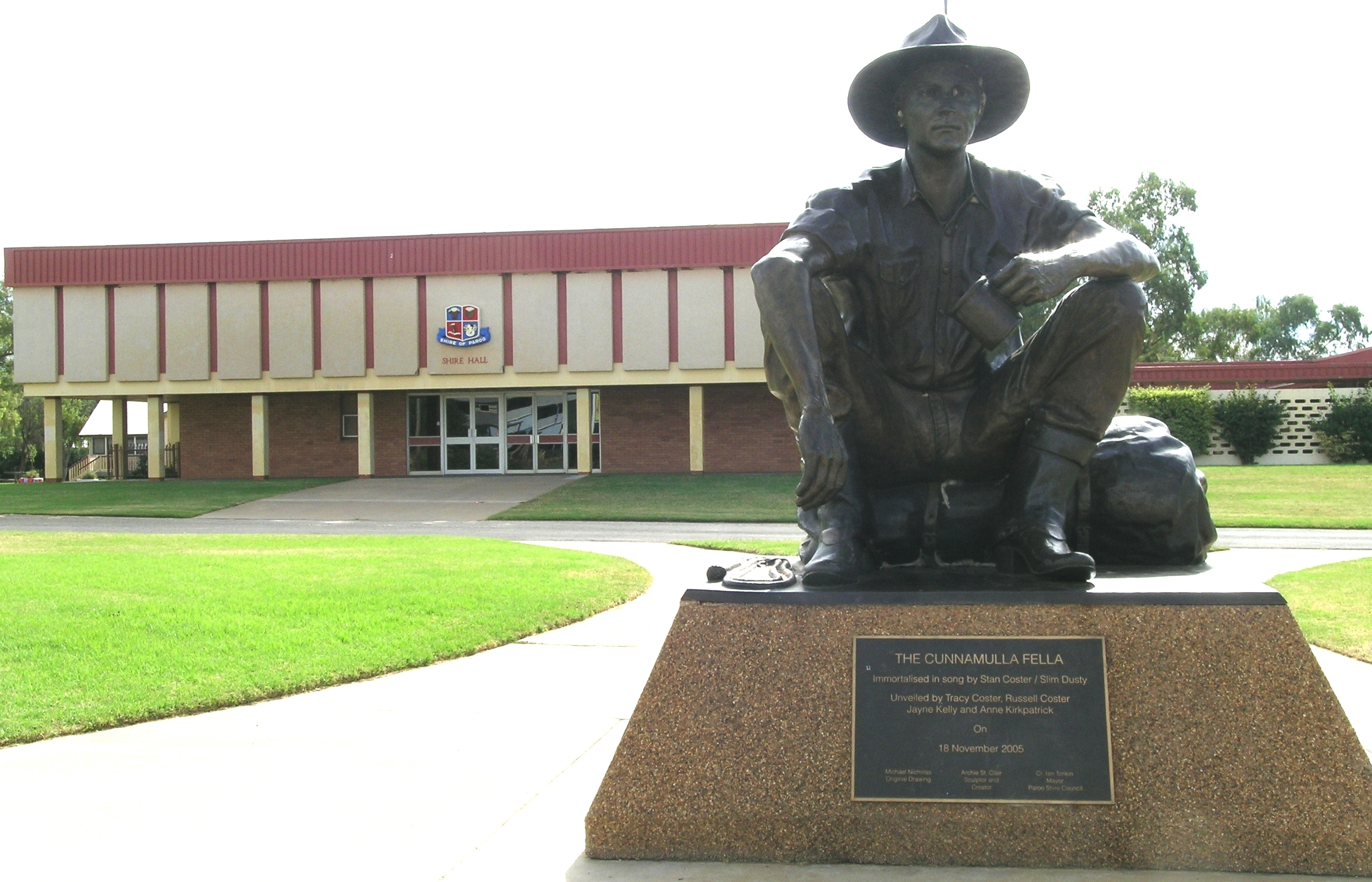
Statue of the "Cunnamulla Fella" erected as a tribute to songwriter Stan Coster and Slim Dusty

In 1951, Dusty married singer-songwriter Joy McKean and, with her help, achieved great success around Australia. In 1954, the two launched a full-time business career, including the Slim Dusty Travelling Show. McKean was Dusty's wife and manager for over 50 years.

McKean's sister Heather, half of the McKean Sisters music duo that preceded Joy's association with Dusty, was married to Australian country singer Reg Lindsay, before separating and later divorcing in the 1980s, whereupon the McKean sisters re-started their music duo.

Together Dusty and Joy McKean had two children, Anne Kirkpatrick and David Kirkpatrick, who are also accomplished singer-songwriters.

=== Dusty hits written by Joy McKean ===
McKean wrote several of Dusty's most popular songs, including "Lights on the Hill", "Walk a Country Mile", "Indian Pacific", "Kelly's Offsider", "The Angel of Goulburn Hill" and "The Biggest Disappointment".

=== Other songwriters' contributions ===
Although himself an accomplished writer of songs, Dusty had a number of other songwriters, including Mack Cormack, Gordon Parsons, Stan Coster, and Kelly Dixon, who were typically short on formal education but big on personal experience of the Australian bush. Drawing on his travels and such writers over a span of decades, Dusty chronicled the story of a rapidly changing postwar Australian nation.

=== First megahit ===
Dusty's 1957 hit "A Pub with No Beer" was the biggest-selling record by an Australian to that time, the first Australian single to go gold and the first and only 78 rpm record to be awarded a gold disc. (The "Pub with No Beer" is a real place, in Ingham, North Queensland].) In 1959 and 1960, Dutch and German cover versions of the song became number one hits (even evergreens) in Belgium, Austria and Germany, brought by the Flemish country singer-guitarist and amusement park founder Bobbejaan Schoepen. In 1964 the annual Slim Dusty Australia-round tour, a 48,280 kilometres (30,000 mi) journey that went on for ten months, was started. This regular event was the subject of a feature film, The Slim Dusty Movie, in 1984.

=== Contributions of other songwriters ===
Dusty recorded not only songs written by himself and other fellow Australian performers but also classic Australian poems by Henry Lawson and Banjo Paterson, with new tunes to call attention to the old "bush ballads". An example is "The Man from Snowy River" by Paterson. The 1980 album and songs The Man Who Steadies the Lead and The Pearl of Them All were the works of Paterson's rival for the title of Australia's bush balladeer, Scottish-Australian poet Will H. Ogilvie (1869–1963). In 1970, Dusty was made a member of the Order of the British Empire for services to music. In 1989 Slim recorded 'Murray Moon' by fellow Aussie Reg Stoneham with vocals by his daughter Anne Kirkpatrick.

== Awards and honours ==
In 1973, Dusty won Best Single at the inaugural Country Music Awards of Australia at the Tamworth Country Music Festival (McKean won Song of the Year as writer of "Lights on the Hill"). By March 1976, Dusty had achieved 37 gold and two platinum records, more than any other Australian artist.

Dusty and his wife were patrons of the National Truck Drivers' Memorial, located in Tarcutta, New South Wales.

The general manager of the Grand Ole Opry in Nashville, Tennessee, Bob Whitaker, invited Dusty and his wife to perform in 1997, recognising 50 years of contributing to country music.

The following January, Dusty was appointed an Officer of the Order of Australia for his service to the entertainment industry.

Dusty recorded and released his 100th album, Looking Forward, Looking Back, in 2000 and became the first artist in worldwide commercial recording history to do so; second was Cliff Richard. All 100 albums were recorded with the same record label, EMI, making Dusty the first music artist in the world to record 100 albums with the same label.

Dusty was appointed to sing "Waltzing Matilda" at the closing ceremony of the 2000 Summer Olympics; the whole stadium (officially 114,714 in attendance, the largest in Olympic history) sang along with him.

=== ARIA Music Awards (ARIA) ===
The Australian Recording Industry Association Music Awards (commonly known informally as ARIA Music Awards or ARIA Awards) is an annual series of awards nights celebrating the Australian music industry, put on by the Australian Recording Industry Association (ARIA). Slim Dusty has won one award from 10 nominations. Additionally, Dusty was awarded two achievement awards and inducted into the Hall of Fame.

| Year | Nominee / work | Award | Result |
|---|---|---|---|
| 1987 | Stories I Wanted to Tell | Best Country Album | Nominated |
| 1988 | himself | ARIA Hall of Fame | inductee |
| 1989 | G'day, G'day! | Best Country Album | Nominated |
| 1990 | Two Singers, One Song (with Anne Kirkpatrick) | Best Country Album | Nominated |
| 1991 | Coming Home | Best Country Album | Nominated |
| 1993 | "Lights on the Hill" (with Keith Urban) | Best Country Album | Nominated |
| 1994 | Ringer from the Top End | Best Country Album | Nominated |
| 1995 | Natural High | Best Country Album | Nominated |
| 1996 | himself | Special Achievement | inductee |
| 2000 | himself | Outstanding Achievement | inductee |
| 2001 | Looking Forward Looking Back | Best Country Album | Won |
| 2001 | Looking Forward Looking Back | Highest Selling Album | Nominated |
| 2004 | Columbia Lane - the Last Sessions | Best Country Album | Nominated |

=== Country Music Awards (CMAA) ===
The Country Music Awards (CMAA) are an annual awards ceremondy celebrating recording excellence in the Australian country music industry. It first commenced in 1973 at the Tamworth Country Music Awards of Australia.

According the Country Music Association of Australia, Slim Dusty won 44 Golden guitar plus, an induction into the Australian Roll of Renown. (listed below). This is more than any other artist.

According to Australian Broadcasting Corporation in 2022, Troy Cassar-Daley won his 40th, surpassing Slim Dusty's record of 38 awards.

| Year | Nominee / work | Award | Result (wins only) |
|---|---|---|---|
| 1973 | Me & My Guitar | Album of the Year | Won |
| 1973 | "Lights on the Hill" | Song of the Year | Won |
| 1973 | "Lights on the Hill" | Best EP or Single | Won |
| 1974 | Live at Tamworth | Album of the Year | Won |
| 1975 | Australiana | Album of the Year | Won |
| 1975 | "Biggest Disappointment" | Song of the Year | Won |
| 1975 | "Biggest Disappointment" | Male Vocalist of the Year | Won |
| 1976 | Lights on the Hill | Album of the Year | Won |
| 1976 | "Worst in the World" | Top selling song of the Year | Won |
| 1977 | Angel of Goulburn Hill | Album of the Year | Won |
| 1977 | "Three Rivers Hotel" | Song of the Year | Won |
| 1977 | "Things I See Around Me" | Top selling song of the Year | Won |
| 1977 | "Angel Of Goulburn Hill" | Male Vocalist of the Year | Won |
| 1978 | "Indian Pacific" | Song of the Year | Won |
| 1978 | "Indian Pacific" | Top selling song of the Year | Won |
| 1979 | "Beat of the Government Stroke" | Song of the Year | Won |
| 1979 | "Marty" | Male Vocalist of the Year | Won |
| 1979 | himself | Australian Roll of Renown | inductee |
| 1980 | Walk a Country Mile | Album of the Year | Won |
| 1980 | Walk a Country Mile | Top Selling | Won |
| 1981 | The Man Who Steadies the Lead | Album of the Year | Won |
| 1981 | The Man Who Steadies the Lead | Top Selling | Won |
| 1982 | "Where Country Is" | Heritage Award | Won |
| 1983 | "Banjo's Man" | Heritage Award | Won |
| 1984 | On the Wallaby | Album of the Year | Won |
| 1984 | Australia's on the Wallaby | Heritage Award | Won |
| 1985 | Trucks on the Track | Album of the Year | Won |
| 1985 | Trucks on the Track | Top Selling | Won |
| 1987 | "He's a Good Bloke when He's Sober" | Song of the Year | Won |
| 1988 | Neon City | Album of the Year | Won |
| 1989 | "We've Done Us Proud" | Song of the Year | Won |
| 1989 | "We've Done Us Proud" | Heritage Award | Won |
| 1991 | "Two Singers, One Song" (with Anne Kirkpatrick) | Top Selling | Won |
| 1991 | Coming Home | Album of the Year | Won |
| 1992 | "Things Are Not the Same on the Land" | Song of the Year | Won |
| 1994 | "Leave Him in the Longyard" (with Lee Kernaghan) | Vocal Group or Duo of the Year | Won |
| 1997 | "Old Time Country Halls" | Heritage Song of the Year | Won |
| 1997 | "Must've Been a Hell of a Party" | Bush Ballad of the Year | Won |
| 1998 | "Lady Is a Truckie" | Bush Ballad of the Year | Won |
| 2001 | Looking Forward Looking Back | Top Selling Album of the Year | Won |
| 2001 | "Looking Forward Looking Back" | Video Clip of the Year | Won |
| 2001 | "Paddy William" | Bush Ballad of the Year | Won |
| 2002 | "West of Winton" | Bush Ballad of the Year | Won |
| 2003 | "Just an Old Cattle Dog" | Bush Ballad of the Year | Won |
| 2005 | "Get Along" | Video Clip of the Year | Won |

=== King of Pop Awards ===
The King of Pop Awards were voted by the readers of TV Week. The King of Pop award started in 1967 and ran until 1978.

| Year | Nominee / work | Award | Result |
|---|---|---|---|
| 1977 | himself | Most Popular Australian Country Musician | Won |
| 1978 | himself | Most Popular Australian Country Musician | Won |

- Note: the Most Popular Australian Country Musician award was only presented in 1977 and 1978.

=== Mo Awards ===
The Australian Entertainment Mo Awards (commonly known informally as the Mo Awards), were annual Australian entertainment industry awards. They recognise achievements in live entertainment in Australia from 1975 to 2016. Slim Dusty won two awards in that time. From 2006, the "best country entertainer" award was named in his honour.

| Year | Nominee / work | Award | Result (wins only) |
|---|---|---|---|
| 1985 | Slim Dusty | Male Country Entertainer of the Year | Won |
| 2015 | Slim Dusty | Special Lifetime Achievement Award | Won |

=== Tamworth Songwriters Awards ===
The Tamworth Songwriters Association (TSA) is an annual songwriting contest for original country songs, awarded in January at the Tamworth Country Music Festival. They commenced in 1986. Slim Dusty won two awards in that time.

| Year | Nominee / work | Award | Result (wins only) |
|---|---|---|---|
| 1993 | "Bucking Horse Called Time" by Slim Dusty and Keith Garvey | Traditional Bush Ballad of the Year | Won |
| 1996 | "Fifteen Hundred Head" by Slim Dusty and K&M Dixon | Traditional Bush Ballad of the Year | Won |

== Country gospel music interest ==
Dusty's repertoire included country gospel music, with which he liked to finish his shows. His live albums usually carried the theme, and in 1971 he released the Gospel album Glory Bound Train featuring the eponymous hit Glory Bound Train and other songs of a Christian theme. Glory Bound Train was in turn the song selected to conclude the tribute concert held at Tamworth after his death. The "Concert for Slim" was recorded live on 20 January 2004, at the Tamworth Regional Entertainment Centre, and an all-star cast of Australian musicians sang out the show with Slim's Glory Bound Train. The DVD was certified 3× Platinum in Australia.

== Death ==
Dusty died at his St Ives, New South Wales, home on 19 September 2003, at the age of 76 after a protracted battle with lung and kidney cancer.

Eminent figures, including the Prime Minister of Australia, John Howard, and the federal opposition leader, Simon Crean, attended a state funeral at St Andrew's Cathedral, Sydney, on 26 September 2003, where thousands had gathered. In the funeral, the Anglican Dean of Sydney, Phillip Jensen paid tribute by leading the congregation of family, statesmen, fans and musicians in the singing of "A Pub With No Beer". Several tributes were featured from Dusty's children as well as words from other national musicians (Peter Garrett and John Williamson) and music from Graeme Connors, Kasey Chambers and Troy Cassar-Daley. Around Australia, thousands of fans gathered to stand outside the cathedral; Dusty was later cremated.

Dusty was working on his 106th album as a solo artist for EMI at the time of his death. On 8 March 2004 the album, Columbia Lane – the Last Sessions, debuted at number five on the Australian album charts and number one on the country charts. Gold status was achieved after being on sale for less than two weeks. Columbia Lane is a tribute to the laneway off Parramatta Road in Strathfield (near the railway bridge link), where the EMI studios once stood (now a Kennards Self Storage store), and where he began his recording career.

On 20 January 2004, Tamworth hosted the "Concert for Slim" as a memorial tribute featuring more than 30 Australian musical artists including Joy McKean, Paul Kelly, Keith Urban, Lee Kernaghan and Kasey Chambers.

In 2005, in tribute to the iconic song "Cunnamulla Fella" performed by Dusty with lyrics by Stan Coster, an eponymous statue was unveiled in the Queensland town of Cunnamulla.

EMI Records' Australian sales of Dusty's records surpassed seven million in 2007.

== Milestones ==
Slim Dusty was Australia's most successful and prolific musical artist, with more Gold and Platinum albums than any other Australian artist. He was also:

- The first Australian to receive a Gold Record.
- Made a Member of the Order of the British Empire and an Officer of the Order of Australia for services to entertainment.
- On 14 April 1981, on Space Shuttle Columbia's first mission, Dusty's rendition of "Waltzing Matilda" was broadcast to Earth.
- In 2013, the Royal Australian Mint issued a coin celebrating his life.
- Dusty's image was featured on an Australia Post postage stamp.
- In December 2020, Slim Dusty was listed at number 40 in Rolling Stone Australia's "50 Greatest Australian Artists of All Time" issue.

== Legacy ==
- Dusty's life was the subject of a 1984 feature film: The Slim Dusty Movie.
- "Pub With No Beer" was added to the National Film and Sound Archive's Sounds of Australia registry in 2008.
- The 2010 book 100 Best Australian Albums by Toby Creswell, Craig Mathieson and John O'Donnell ranked The Very Best of Slim Dusty as the 24th best Australian album of the previous 50 years.
- The Slim Dusty Centre was built in Kempsey, NSW, Dusty's home town, and opened in October 2015.

== Discography ==
EMI Records' Australian sales of Slim Dusty records surpassed 7 million in 2007.
