= Tania Kernaghan =

Australian country music singer (born 1968)

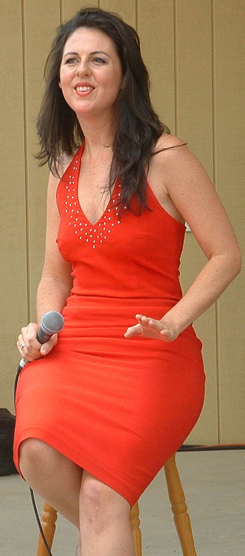

Background information
- Born: 18 July 1968 (age 58); Albury, New South Wales, Australia
- Genre: Country
- Occupation: Singer
- Years active: 1992–present
- Label: ABC Records KCR
- Website: Tania Kernaghan Official Site

Tania Maree Kernaghan (born 18 July 1968) is an Australian country music singer.

During her career, Tania has earned fifteen number one radio hits singles, numerous awards, sell out concerts and record sales in the hundreds of thousands. She has also performed at the Grand Ole Opry in Nashville.

Tania is Vice Patron for Riding for the Disabled Association Australia (RDA).

== Career ==
In 1992, Kernaghan released her first single, "I'll Be Gone".

Her first album, December Moon, was released in January 1996. It was nominated for Best Country Album at the ARIA Music Awards of 1996. The album was certified Gold by ARIA in 1997 and Platinum in 1998.

At the time of releasing her fourth album Higher Ground in 2005, Tania started her own record label, KCR.

Tania is also a horsewomen and she has spoken at multiple keynotes across Australia.

== Discography ==
=== Studio albums ===
Title	Details	Peak chart positions		Certifications (sales thresholds)
Title	Details	AUS	AUS Country	Certifications (sales thresholds)
December Moon	Released: January 1996; Label: ABC Music	30	—N/a	ARIA: Platinum
Dancing On Water	Released: February 1999; Label: ABC Music	29	—N/a	
Big Sky Country	Released: 5 November 2001; Label: ABC Music	—	4	
Higher Ground	Released: 19 October 2005; Label: KCR / Shock	—	5	
Livin' the Dream	Released: 9 February 2009; Label: KCR / Shock	—	17	
All Australian Girl	Released: 17 February 2017; Label: Tania Kernaghan Productions / WJO	43	6	
"—" denotes the album failed to chart or was not released.

=== Compilation albums ===
Title	Details
Greatest Hits	Released: 16 May 2012; Label: KCR / Shock; First greatest hits album (CD/DVD)

== Awards and nominations ==
=== AIR Awards ===
The Australian Independent Record Awards (commonly known informally as AIR Awards) is an annual awards night to recognise, promote and celebrate the success of Australia's Independent Music sector.

Year	Nominee / work	Award	Result
2009	Livin' the Dream	Best Independent Country Album	Nominated

=== ARIA Music Awards ===
The ARIA Music Awards are a set of annual ceremonies presented by Australian Recording Industry Association (ARIA), which recognise excellence, innovation, and achievement across all genres of the music of Australia. They commenced in 1987.

Year	Nominee / work	Award	Result	Ref.
1996	December Moon	Best Country Album	Nominated	
1999	Dancing on Water	Best Country Album	Nominated	

=== Country Music Awards of Australia ===
The Country Music Awards of Australia (CMAA) (also known as the Golden Guitar Awards) is an annual awards night held in January during the Tamworth Country Music Festival, celebrating recording excellence in the Australian country music industry. They have been held annually since 1973.

Year	Nominee / work	Award	Result (wins only)
1997	December Moon	Album of the Year	Won
1997	Tania Kernaghan for "Where the Murray Meets the Darling"	Female Vocalist of the Year	Won
1997	"A Bushman Can't Survive" with Lee Kernaghan	Vocal Collaboration of the Year	Won
1998	Tania Kernaghan for "Dunroamin' Station"	Female Vocalist of the Year	Won
1999	Tania Kernaghan	Hands of Fame	imprinted

=== Tamworth Songwriters Awards ===
The Tamworth Songwriters Association (TSA) is an annual songwriting contest for original country songs, awarded in January at the Tamworth Country Music Festival. They commenced in 1986.

Year	Nominee / work	Award	Result (wins only)
1997	"Where the Murray Meets the Darling" by Tania Kernaghan	Songmaker Award	Won

== Other projects ==
Tania is a presenter for Lifestyle TV Program What's Up Downunder which currently airs on Channel 10, One Digital, Southern Cross and numerous regional affiliates .

She also had a part in the film 'Shadows of the Past' playing the role of Sally Robson. And in 2019 appeared in Australian Indie Movie, An Unconventional Love

Tania is Ambassador for Outback Queensland Tourism Association and Board Member
