= Adam Brand discography =

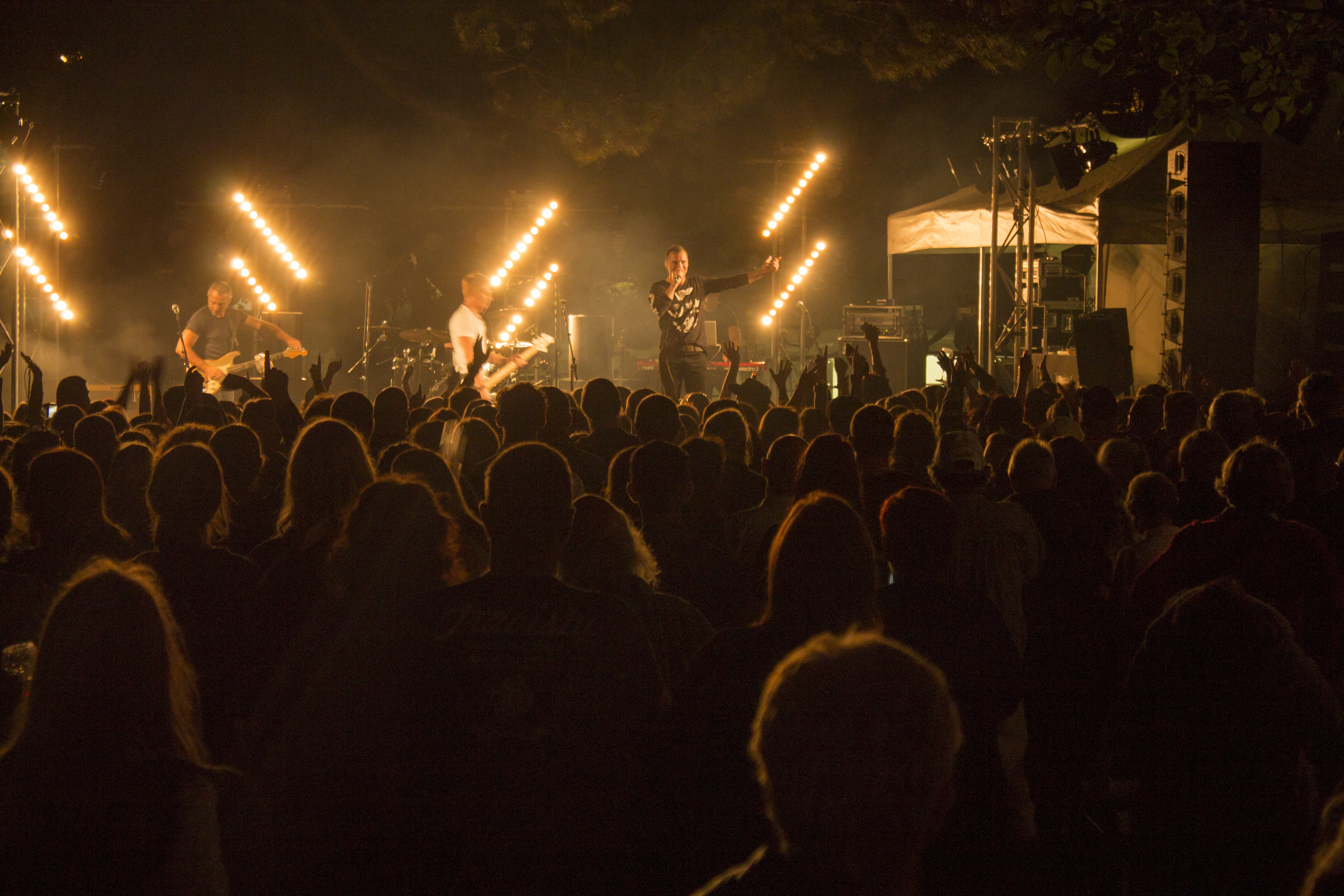
- Adam Brand performing in February 2017
- Studio albums: 16
- Compilation albums: 3
- Video albums: 3

The discography of Adam Brand, an Australian country singer, consists of sixteen studio albums, three compilation albums and three live albums.

As of 2013, Adam Brand has achieved a sales history of over half a million albums and DVDs.

== Albums ==
=== Studio albums ===
Title	Details	Peak positions	Certifications (sales thresholds)
Title	Details	AUS	Certifications (sales thresholds)
Adam Brand	Release date: July 1998; Label: Flying Nun Records, Festival; Formats: CD, cassette	44	ARIA: Platinum
Good Friends	Release date: March 2000; Label: Compass Brothers, Festival; Formats: CD, cassette	26	ARIA: Platinum
Built for Speed	Release date: 14 January 2002; Label: Compass Brothers, Festival; Formats: CD, cassette	24	ARIA: Platinum
Get Loud	Release date: 9 August 2004; Label: Compass Records, Sony; Formats: CD, download	16	ARIA: Gold
Christmas in Australia (credited to Adam Brand and Friends)	Release date: 10 October 2005; Label: Compass Records, Universal; Formats: CD, download	—	
What a Life	Release date: 13 July 2006; Label: Compass Brothers, Sony; Formats: CD, download	28	ARIA: Gold
Blame It on Eve	Release date: 21 January 2008; Label: Compass Brothers, Universal; Format: CD, download	10	
Hell of a Ride	Release date: 6 March 2009; Label: Compass Brothers, Shock Records; Formats: CD, download	19	
It's Gonna Be OK	Release date: 20 August 2010; Label: Compass Brothers, Shcok; Formats: CD, download	11	
There Will Be Love	Release date: 10 August 2012; Label: Arista Nashville, Sony Music Australia; Formats: CD, download	4	
My Acoustic Diary	Release date: 8 November 2013; Label: Adam Brand / ABC Music; Formats: CD, download	31	
My Side of the Street	Release date: 18 August 2014; Label: Adam Brand / ABC Music; Formats: CD, download	5	
Adam Brand and the Outlaws (as Adam Brand and the Outlaws)	Release date: 8 January 2016; Label: Adam Brand / ABC Music; Formats: CD, download	6	
Get On Your Feet	Release date: 10 February 2017; Label: Adam Brand / Universal Music Australia; Formats: CD, download	7	
Speed of Life	Release date: 13 March 2020; Label: ABC / Universal Music Australia; Formats: CD, download, streaming	6	
All or Nothing	Released: 26 August 2022; Label: Adam Brand Enterprises, ABC; Formats: CD, download	6	

=== Compilation albums ===
Title	Details	Peak positions
Title	Details	AUS
Greatest Hits 1998–2008	Release date: September 2008; Label: Sony Records; Formats: CD, download	68
You're a Revhead	Release date: 27 May 2011; Label: Compass Brothers, Shock; Formats: CD, download	39
Milestones... 20 Years	Release date: 13 July 2018; Label: Adam Brand, ABC, Universal Music Australia; Formats: CD, download, streaming	6

=== Video albums ===
Title	Details	Peak positions	Certifications (sales thresholds)
Title	Details	AUS DVD	Certifications (sales thresholds)
Good Friend - Live In Concert	Released: 2003; Label: Compass Bros Records (001DVDCB)	39	ARIA: Gold
Built for Speed - Live In Concert	Released: August 2003; Label: Compass Bros Records (002DVDCB)	15	ARIA: Gold
Greatest Hits 1998 - 2008	Released: September 2008; Label: Compass Bros Records (005DVDCB)	26	

== Singles ==
=== Singles as lead artist ===
Year	Single	Peak positions	Album
Year	Single	US Country	Album
1998	"Last Man Standing"	—	Adam Brand
1999	"Dirt Track Cowboys"	—	Adam Brand
1999	"Last Man Standing" (with Melinda Schneider)	—	Adam Brand
2000	"Beating Around the Bush"	—	Good Friends
2000	"Good Friends"	—	Good Friends
2001	"Good Things in Life"	—	Good Friends
2001	"I Did What?"	—	Good Friends
2004	"Get Loud"	—	Get Loud
2005	"She's Country"	—	Get Loud
2006	"Open Ended Heartache"	—	What a Life
2007	"Can't Live Without Your Love"	—	What a Life
2007	"Cigarettes & Whiskey"	—	What a Life
2007	"That Changes Everything"	—	What a Life
2008	"Blame It on Eve"	—	Blame It on Eve
2008	"Comin' from / Khe Sanh"	—	Blame It on Eve
2008	"Get On Down the Road"	—	Blame It on Eve
2009	"Hell of a Ride"	—	Hell of a Ride
2009	"Ready for Love"	46	Hell of a Ride
2010	"It's Gonna Be OK"	—	It's Gonna Be OK
2011	"Some Just Live"	—	There Will Be Love
2012	"There Will Be Love"	—	There Will Be Love
2013	"She Got Away"	—	There Will Be Love
2013	"Freedom Rebels"	—	My Acoustic Diary
2014	"Hearts I Leave Behind"	—	My Side of the Street
2015	"Good Year for the Outlaw" (featuring The Outlaws)	—	Adam Brand and the Outlaws
2016	"I Fought the Law" (featuring The Outlaws)	—	Adam Brand and the Outlaws
2016	"Get On Your Feet"	—	Get On Your Feet
2017	"Drunk"	—	Get On Your Feet
2018	"Milestones"	—	Milestones... 20 Years
2019	"Life's Been Good to Me"	—	Speed of Life
2019	"Speed of Life"	—	Speed of Life
2020	"Freakin' Weekend"	—	Speed of Life
2020	"You Are Not Alone" (with Casey Donovan)	—	Speed of Life
2021	"I'm Coming Home"	—	All or Nothing
2021	"Still the One"	—	All or Nothing
2022	"All Or Nothing"	—	All or Nothing
2022	"When God Walks In The Room"	—	All or Nothing
"—" denotes releases that did not chart

=== Guest singles ===
Year	Single	Artist	Peak positions	Album
Year	Single	Artist	AUS	Album
2007	"Spirit of the Bush"	Lee Kernaghan (featuring Adam Brand and Steve Forde)	11	Spirit of the Bush
2018	"Way Out West"	James Blundell (with Tania Kernaghan, Brewn', Bec Lavelle, Ben Ransom and Paul Costa)	–	30 Years of Pride: A Tribute to James Blundel
2018	"Rain"	(with Scott Darlow, Sarah McLeod, Jack Jones and Todd Hunter)	–	non-album single
