= Adam Brand =

Adam Brand may refer to:

- Adam Brand (explorer) (before 1692–1746), German merchant and explorer
- Adam Brand (musician) (born 1970), Australian country musician
  - Adam Brand (album), 1998 debut studio album by Australian country musician Adam Brand
