= Living Right =

Living Right or Livin' Right can refer to:

- Livin' Right (album), the debut album by Steve Forde and the Flange
- "Livin' Right", a song by Glenn Frey
- "Living Right", a song by Lil Wayne featuring Wiz Khalifa, on Lil Wayne's album Free Weezy Album

== See also ==
- Right to an adequate standard of living
- Right to life (disambiguation)
