= Revhead =

"Revhead" may refer to:

- car enthusiast (term used in Australia)
- A fan of the rock group, The Revivalists (New Orleans)
- "hoon" or "boy racer" (term used in Australia)
- Revhead (Home and Away), fictional character in Australian soap opera Home and Away
- You're a Revhead, a 2011 compilation by Australian musician Adam Brand.
