= Built for Speed =

Built for Speed may refer to:

- Built for Speed (Stray Cats album), a 1982 album by Stray Cats and its title track
- Built for Speed (Adam Brand album), a 2002 album by Adam Brand
- "Built for Speed", a 1986 song by Motörhead from the album Orgasmatron
