= 2011 Australian Manufacturers' Championship =

The 2011 Australian Manufacturers' Championship was a CAMS sanctioned national motor racing championship for car manufacturers. It was the 26th manufacturers title to be awarded by CAMS and the 17th to be contested under the Australian Manufacturers' Championship name. The championship, which was open to modified production touring cars, also incorporated three drivers titles, the 2011 Australian Production Car Championship, the 2011 Australian Production Car Endurance Championship and the 2011 Australian Endurance Championship.

A major change from the 2010 championship saw a greater emphasis on longer races. Only the opening round of the series at Phillip Island comprising two short sprint races. Two rounds were extended into a six-hour endurance race format. The increased emphasis on endurance races saw the return of the long-running Sandown 500 event, last run for V8 Supercars in 2007.

Japanese manufacturer Mitsubishi won the Australian Manufacturers Championship, Stuart Kostera won the Australian Production Car Championship, Kostera and Ian Tulloch won the Australian Endurance Championship and the same pairing won the Australian Production Car Endurance Championship.

Defending Australian Production Car Champion, Western Australian Mitsubishi Lancer Evo driver Stuart Kostera dominated the series, winning six races and four rounds with a second position in the final race of the year at Eastern Creek. The result was so impressive, Kostera's part-time co-driver New Zealander Ian Tulloch finished second in the championship. In a clean sweep for Mitsubishi Lancer Evo drivers, Jim Pollicina finished third. The first non-Mitsubishi driver was Queenslander driver Jake Camilleri Mazda 3 in fourth.

The final race of the year, the Eastern Creek Six Hour, was the only race not won by Kostera. It was won by the BMW 335i of Chaz Mostert and Nathan Morcom.

== Calendar ==
The championship was contested over a five-round series.

Rd.	Circuit	Location / state	Event	Date	Format	Winners	
Rd.	Circuit	Location / state	Event	Date	Format	Drivers	Car
Rd 1	Phillip Island Grand Prix Circuit	Phillip Island, Victoria		16–17 April	2 x 20 laps	Stuart Kostera	Mitsubishi Lancer Evo X
Rd 2	Phillip Island Grand Prix Circuit	Phillip Island, Victoria	Phillip Island Six Hour	27–29 May	1 x 6 hour	Stuart Kostera; Ian Tulloch	Mitsubishi Lancer Evo X
Rd 3	Morgan Park Raceway	Warwick, Queensland		12–14 August	2 × 1 hour	Stuart Kostera; Ian Tulloch	Mitsubishi Lancer Evo X
Rd 4	Sandown Raceway	Melbourne, Victoria	Sandown 500	9–11 September	500 km (split into 2 legs)	Stuart Kostera; Ian Tulloch	Mitsubishi Lancer Evo X
Rd 5	Eastern Creek Raceway	Sydney, New South Wales	Eastern Creek Six Hour	9–11 December	1 x 6-hour	Nathan Morcom; Chaz Mostert	BMW 335i

== Class structure ==
Cars competed in the following six classes:

- Class A : Extreme Performance
- Class B : High Performance
- Class C : Performance Touring
- Class D : Production Touring
- Class E : Compact Touring
- Class I : Invitational (former Mini Challenge cars – not eligible for championship points)

== Points system ==
Each manufacturer registered for the Australian Manufucturers' Championship was eligible to score points in each race, but only for the two highest placed automobiles of its make in any class.

- In rounds with one scheduled race, points were awarded to manufacturers on a 120–90–72–60–54–48–42–36–30–24–18–12–6 basis for the first thirteen places in each class with 3 points for other finishers.
- In rounds with two scheduled races, points were awarded to manufacturers on a 60–45–36–30–27–24–21–18–15–12–9–6–3 basis for the first thirteen places in each class in each race with 2 points for other finishers.

Points towards the Australian Production Car Championship outright title were awarded to drivers based on outright finishing positions attained in each race. Points were awarded using the same two scales as used for the Australian Manufacturers' Championship with the addition of two points for the driver setting the fastest qualifying lap in each class at each round.

Points towards the Australian Production Car Championship class titles were awarded to drivers based on class finishing positions attained in each race. Points were awarded using the same two scales as used for the Australian Manufacturers' Championship with the addition of two points for the driver setting the fastest qualifying lap in each class at each round.

Points towards the Australian Production Car Endurance Championship were awarded to drivers on a 120–90–72–60–54–48–42–36–30–24–18–12–6 basis for outright finishing positions attained in Rounds 2 and 5 of the championship.

Points towards the Australian Endurance Championship were awarded to drivers on a 120–90–72–60–54–48–42–36–30–24–18–12–6 for outright finishing positions attained in Rounds 2, 4 and 5 of the championship.

Drivers of Class I Invitational cars were not eligible to score points in any of the championships and points were allocated in all cases as though Class I cars were not competing in the race.

== Championship results ==
=== Australian Manufacturers' Championship ===
Mitsubishi won the Manufacturers' Championship.

Pos.	Manufacturer	R1	R2	R3	R4	R5	Total
1	Mitsubishi	210	210	210	210	210	1050
2	Mazda	165	180	210	192	210	957
3	BMW	87	210	201	210	120	828
4	Toyota	195	180	150	90	72	687
5	Proton	120	120	120	120	90	570
6	Ford	141	120	81	0	0	342
7	Honda	0	0	0	120	210	330
8	Holden	105	162	0	0	0	267
9	Suzuki	0	0	0	90	120	210
10	Subaru	0	0	0	54	60	114
11	Mini	66	0	36	0	0	102
12	Renault	90	0	0	0	0	90

=== Australian Production Car Championship ===
==== Outright ====
Pos.	Driver	No.	Car	Class	Team	R1		R2	R3		R4	R5	Total
1	Stuart Kostera	55 & 1	Mitsubishi Lancer Evo X	A	Team Mitsubishi Ralliart	**1st**	1st	**1st**	**1st**	1st	1st	2nd	576
2	Ian Tulloch	1	Mitsubishi Lancer Evo X	A	Team Mitsubishi Ralliart			1st	1st	1st	1st	2nd	450
3	Jim Pollicina	7	Mitsubishi Lancer Evo IX	A	Jim Pollicina	6th	3rd	3rd	3rd	3rd	3rd	7th	321
4	Jake Camilleri	36	Mazda 3 MPS	C	Grand Prix Mazda	**5th**	2nd	**2nd**	**4th**	4th	**7th**	14th	281
5	Dylan Thomas	68	Mitsubishi Lancer Evo IX	A	CXC Racing			Ret	2nd	2nd	4th	4th	210
6	Peter O'Donnell	28	BMW 335i	B	GWS Personnel	**4th**	Ret	7th	5th	5th	6th		188
7	Nathan Morcom	11	BMW 335i	B	Eastern Creek Karts			5th				1st	174
8	Tony Quinn	29	Mitsubishi Lancer Evo IX	A	VIP Petfoods Racing						2nd	**3rd**	164
9	Klark Quinn	29	Mitsubishi Lancer Evo IX	A	VIP Petfoods Racing						2nd	3rd	162
10	Hadrian Morrall	31	Mazda 3 MPS	C	Osborne Motorsport	9th	Ret	10th	7th	7th	14th	6th	156
11	Dave Thomas	68	Mitsubishi Lancer Evo IX	A	CXC Racing	12th	7th				4th	4th	153
12	Dean Kelland	7	Mitsubishi Lancer Evo IX	A	Jim Pollicina			3rd			3rd		144
13	Scott Nicholas	36	Mazda 3 MPS	C	Grand Prix Mazda			2nd			7th	14th	138
14	Ryan McLeod	20	HSV VXR	C	Racer Industries	2nd	5th	4th			Ret		135
15	Chaz Mostert	11	BMW 335i	B	Eastern Creek Karts							**1st**	122
16	Steve Cramp	7	Mitsubishi Lancer Evo IX	A	Jim Pollicina			3rd				7th	114
17	Cameron Wilson	25	Subaru Impreza WRX STi	A	Wilson Brothers Racing			Ret	DNS	DNS	**5th**	5th	110
18	Peter Burnitt	25	Subaru Impreza WRX STi	A	Wilson Brothers Racing			Ret			5th	5th	108
19	John Bowe	28	BMW 335i	B	GWS Personnel			**7th**			**6th**		100
20	Grant Phillips	77	Proton Satria STi	E	Pedders Racing	15th	11th	13th	**12th**	10th	13th	**13th**	84
21	Garth Duffy	26	BMW 130i	C	GWS Personnel			9th			8th		78
22	Jake Williams	5; 21	Toyota Corolla Sportivo; Honda Integra Type R	D	Lauren Gray Motorsport; Conroy Motorsport			16th			11th	9th	69
23	Colin Osborne	13	Mazda 3 MPS	C	Osborne Motorsport	10th	Ret	Ret	6th	6th	Ret	DNS	63
23	Declan Kirkham	71	Ford Fiesta	D	Robinson Racing	13th	9th	11th	11th	Ret	Ret		63
25	Jason Bright	20	HSV VXR	C	Racer Industries			4th					60
26	Matt McGill	75	Toyota Celica VVTL-i	D	Osborne Motorsport	16th	14th	14th	10th	Ret	**12th**	15th	58
27	Geoff Brunsdon	75	Toyota Celica VVTL-i	D	Osborne Motorsport	16th	14th	14th	10th	Ret	12th	15th	56
29	Garry Holt	11	BMW 335i	B	Eastern Creek Karts			5th					54
29	Barry Morcom	11	BMW 335i	B	Eastern Creek Karts			5th					54
29	David Wood	25	Subaru Impreza WRX STi	A	Wilson Brothers Racing				DNS	DNS		5th	54
32	Daryl Martin	77	Proton Satria STi	E	Pedders Racing			13th			13th	13th	48
32	Andrew Turpie	77	Proton Satria STi	E	Pedders Racing			13th			13th	13th	48
34	Gerard McLeod	20	HSV VXR	C	Racer Industries	2nd	DNS				Ret		45
34	Lauren Gray	5	Toyota Corolla Sportivo	D	Lauren Gray Motorsport	8th	8th	16th					45
34	Phil Kirkham	71	Ford Fiesta	D	Robinson Racing	13th	DNS	11th	11th	Ret	Ret		45
37	Dean Lillie	7	Mitsubishi Lancer Evo IX	A	Jim Pollicina							7th	42
37	Kean Booker	26	BMW 130i	C	GWS Personnel			9th					42
39	Richard Gartner	97	Renault Clio 197	D	Safe-T-Stop	**7th**	13th	**Ret**	**Ret**	DNS			36
39	Matt Hayes	26	BMW 130i	C	GWS Personnel						8th		36
39	Todd Betland	21	Honda Integra Type R	D	Conroy Motorsport							9th	36
39	Robert Jones	31	Mazda 3 MPS	C	Osborne Motorsport			10th					36
43	Grant Sherrin	19	BMW 135i	B	Sherrin Rentals				**9th**	8th		Ret	35
44	Jeremy Gray	10	FPV F6 310	B	International Energy Services			Ret	8th	9th	Ret		33
45	Mark Eddy	51	Honda Integra Type R	D	Jenmal Motorsport							**10th**	32
46	Francois Jouy	51	Honda Integra Type R	D	Jenmal Motorsport							10th	30
46	Richard Mork	21	Honda Integra Type R	D	Conroy Motorsport						11th		30
48	Barton Mawer	10	FPV F6 310	B	International Energy Services	Ret	6th	Ret			Ret		27
49	Robert Jarvis	17; 27	Suzuki Swift Sport	E	Trans-Tasman Motorsport; Toasted Motorsport						**15th**	12th	26
50	David Wall	38	Mitsubishi Lancer Evo IX	A	Easts Holiday Parks							11th	24
50	Des Wall	38	Mitsubishi Lancer Evo IX	A	Easts Holiday Parks							11th	24
50	Matthew Holt	65	HSV GTS	B				12th					24
50	Brett Howard	65	HSV GTS	B				12th					24
50	Anthony Loscialpo	65	HSV GTS	B				12th					24
55	Trevor Keene	50	Mini Cooper S	D	Mid West Multi Media	14th	10th		14th	DNS		Ret	21
56	Maddison Gray	15	Toyota Echo Sportivo	E	Lauren Gray Motorsport	**17th**	12th	15th					19
57	Allan Jarvis	27	Suzuki Swift Sport	E	Toasted Motorsport						Ret	12th	18
57	Adam Brand	27	Suzuki Swift Sport	E	Toasted Motorsport							12th	18
59	Paul Nelson	15	Toyota Yaris	E	Symes Coaches				13th	11th			12
59	Greg Symes	93	BMW 130i Mitsubishi Lancer Evo IX	C A	Symes Coaches	11th	Ret		Ret	Ret	Ret	Ret	12
59	David Gyuni	31	Mazda 3 MPS	C	Osborne Motorsport						14th		12
62	Ashley Quiddington	15	Toyota Echo Sportivo	E	Lauren Gray Motorsport			**15th**					8
63	Michael Gray	17	Suzuki Swift Sport	E	Trans-Tasman Motorsport						15th		6
64	Rick Bates	13	Mazda 3 MPS	C	Osborne Motorsport			Ret				**DNS**	2
	Beric Lynton	23	Mini Cooper S JCW	I	Bruce Lynton Mini Garage	3rd	4th	6th			9th	Ret	0
	Tom Pickett	23	Mini Cooper S JCW	I	Bruce Lynton Mini Garage			6th				Ret	0
	Mathew Mackelden	2; 23	Mini Cooper S JCW	I	Brendon Cook; Bruce Lynton Mini Garage			8th			9th		0
	Brendon Cook	2	Mini Cooper S JCW	I	Brendon Cook			8th			10th		0
	Brendon Cook	17	Suzuki Swift Sport	E	BVC Racing							Ret	0
	Michael Sherrin	72	Mini Cooper S JCW	I	Sherrin Rentals				Ret	12th		8th	0
	David Ayers	72	Mini Cooper S JCW	I	Sherrin Rentals							8th	0
	John Modystach	2	Mini Cooper S JCW	I	Brendon Cook						10th		0
	Carl Schembri	97	Renault Clio 197	D	Safe-T-Stop			Ret					0
	Ryan Simpson	68	Mitsubishi Lancer Evo IX	A	CXC Racing			Ret					0
	Glenn Seton	93	Mitsubishi Lancer Evo IX	A	Symes Coaches						Ret	Ret	0
	Morgan Haber	27	Suzuki Swift Sport	E	Trans-Tasman Motorsport						Ret		0
	Ric Shaw	13	Mazda 3 MPS	C	Osborne Motorsport						Ret		0
	Iain Sherrin	19	BMW 135i	B	Sherrin Rentals							Ret	0
	Matt Brady	6	Ford BF Falcon XR6T	C	Graham Lusty Trailers							Ret	0
	Darrel Dixon	6	Ford BF Falcon XR6T	C	Graham Lusty Trailers							Ret	0
	Graham Lusty	6	Ford BF Falcon XR6T	C	Graham Lusty Trailers							Ret	0
	Phil Alexander	50	Mini Cooper S	D	Mid West Multi Media							Ret	0
	Graeme Heath	50	Mini Cooper S	D	Mid West Multi Media							Ret	0
	Brooke Leech	17	Suzuki Swift Sport	E	BVC Racing							Ret	0
	Justin Johns	17	Suzuki Swift Sport	E	BVC Racing							DNS	0

Colour	Result
Gold	Winner
Silver	Second place
Bronze	Third place
Green	Points classification
Blue	Non-points classification
Blue	Non-classified finish (NC)
Purple	Retired, not classified (Ret)
Red	Did not qualify (DNQ)
Red	Did not pre-qualify (DNPQ)
Black	Disqualified (DSQ)
White	Did not start (DNS)
White	Withdrew (WD)
White	Race cancelled (C)
Blank	Did not practice (DNP)
Blank	Did not arrive (DNA)
Blank	Excluded (EX)

Bold – Pole in class

Note: Drivers of Class I Invitational cars were not eligible to score points in any of the championships and points were allocated in all cases as though Class I cars are not competing in the race.

Points totals sourced partly from:

Race placings sourced from:

==== Classes ====
- Class A Extreme Performance was won by Stuart Kostera (Mitsubishi Lancer Evo X) from Ian Tulloch (Mitsubishi Lancer Evo X).
- Class B High Performance was won by Peter O’Donnell (BMW 335i).
- Class C Performance Touring was won by Jake Camilleri (Mazda 3 MPS).
- Class D Production Touring was won by Matt McGill (Toyota Celica).
- Class E Compact Touring was won by Grant Phillip (Proton Satria GTi) from Daryl Martin (Proton Satria GTi) and Andrew Turpie (Proton Satria GTi).

=== Australian Endurance Championship ===
The Australian Endurance Championship, which was contested over Rounds 2, 4 and 5 of the series, was won jointly by Stuart Kostera (Mitsubishi Lancer Evo X) and Ian Tulloch (Mitsubishi Lancer Evo X).

=== Australian Production Car Endurance Championship ===
The Australian Production Car Endurance Championship, which was contested over Rounds 2 and 5 of the series, was won jointly by Stuart Kostera (Mitsubishi Lancer Evo X) and Ian Tulloch (Mitsubishi Lancer Evo X) from Nathan Morcom (BMW 335i) and Chaz Mostert (BMW 335i).
