= I'm Gonna Be Alright (disambiguation) =

"I'm Gonna Be Alright" is a song by Jennifer Lopez.

I'm Gonna Be Alright may also refer to:

- "I'm Gonna Be All Right", song performed by Donna Loren, and written by Nancie Mantz and Dave Burgess in 1962
- "I'm Gonna Be Alright", song by Prince Markie Dee from the 1992 album Free

== See also ==
- It's Gonna Be Alright (disambiguation)
