= 2011 Eastern Creek Six Hour =

Layout of the Eastern Creek Raceway

The 2011 Eastern Creek Six Hour was an endurance motor race for production cars, held on 11 December 2011, at Eastern Creek Raceway in Sydney, New South Wales, Australia. It was Round 5 of the 2011 Australian Manufacturers' Championship, Round 5 of the 2011 Australian Production Car Championship, Round 3 of the 2011 Australian Endurance Championship and Round 2 of the 2011 Australian Production Car Endurance Championship. The race was originally to be run over an eight-hour duration, but this was reduced to six hours shortly before the event was run.

The race was won by the BMW 335i of Chaz Mostert and Nathan Morcom and was the only round of the 2011 Australian Manufacturers' Championship not won by Stuart Kostera.

== Class Structure ==
- Class A – Extreme Performance
- Class B – High Performance
- Class C – Performance Touring
- Class D – Production Touring
- Class E – Compact Touring
- Class I – Invitational

== Results ==
Results were as follows:

Pos	Drivers	No.	Vehicle	Team	Class	Laps
1	Chaz Mostert; Nathan Morcom	11	BMW 335i	Barry Morcom	B	254
2	Stuart Kostera; Ian Tulloch	1	Mitsubishi Lancer Evolution X	Team Mitsubishi Ralliart Performance	A	254
3	Tony Quinn; Klark Quinn	29	Mitsubishi Lancer Evolution IX	VIP Petfoods	A	253
4	Dylan Thomas; Dave Thomas	68	Mitsubishi Lancer Evolution IX	CXC Global	A	253
5	Cameron Wilson; Peter Burnitt; David Wood	25	Subaru Impreza WRX STi	Go Karting Gold Coast	A	248
6	Hadrian Morrall; Adam Dodd	31	Mazda 3 MPS	Colin Osbourne Motorsport	C	244
7	Jim Pollicina; Dean Kelland	7	Mitsubishi Lancer Evolution IX	Poll Performance	A	243
8	Michael Sherrin; David Ayres	72	Mini Cooper S	Sherrin Racing	I	239
9	Jake Williams; Todd Betland	21	Honda Integra	Conroy Motorsport	D	238
10	Francois Jouy; Mark Eddy	51	Honda Integra	Mark Eddy Racing	D	237
11	David Wall; Des Wall	38	Mitsubishi Lancer Evolution IX	Allan East Racing	A	226
12	Allan Jarvis; Rob Jarvis; Adam Brand	27	Suzuki Swift Sport	Toasted Motorsport	E	220
13	Grant Phillips; Andrew Turpie; Daryl Martin	77	Proton Satria GTi	Pedders Suspension	E	220
14	Jake Camilleri; Scott Nicholas	36	Mazda 3 MPS	Grand Prix Motorsport	C	214
15	Matt McGill; Geoff Brunsdon	75	Toyota Celica	Weldmaster	D	200
Ret	Graham Lusty; Darryl Dixon; Matt Brady	6	Ford Falcon XR6	Graham Lusty Trailors	C	178
Ret	Trevor Keene; Phil Alexander; Greg Heath	50	Mini Cooper S	Mid West Media Racing	D	160
Ret	Greg Symes; Glenn Seton	93	Mitsubishi Lancer Evolution IX	Symes Coaches	A	144
Ret	Grant Sherrin; Iain Sherrin	19	BMW 135i	Sherrin Racing	B	138
Ret	Brendon Cook; Brooke Leech; Justin Johns	17	Suzuki Swift Sport	BVC Racing; Rhino Money	E	136
Ret	Beric Lynton; Tom Pickett	23	Mini Cooper S	Bruce Lynton Mini Garage	I	31
DNS	Colin Osborne; Rick Bates	13	Mazda 3 MPS	Osborne Motorsport	C	0

== See also ==
- 2010 Eastern Creek 8 Hour Production Car Race
- Motorsport in Australia
