= It's Gonna Be Alright =

It's Gonna Be Alright may refer to:

- "It's Gonna Be Alright" (Deep Zone song), 1995
- "It's Gonna Be Alright" (Ruby Turner song), 1989
- "It's Gonna Be Alright", a 1964 single from Ferry Cross the Mersey by Gerry and the Pacemakers

== See also ==
- It's Gonna Be Right, 1985 album by Cheryl Lynn
- It's Gonna Be OK (disambiguation)
