= 2011 Dial Before You Dig Australian Manufacturers' Championship 500 =

The 2011 Dial Before You Dig Australian Manufacturers' Championship 500 was an endurance motor race for production cars. It was held on 10 and 11 September 2011, at Sandown Raceway in Melbourne, Victoria, Australia. It was Round 4 of the 2011 Australian Manufacturers' Championship, Round 4 of the 2011 Australian Production Car Championship and Round 2 of the 2011 Australian Production Car Endurance Championship. The race was won by Stuart Kostera and Ian Tulloch, driving a Mitsubishi Lancer Evolution X. The Lancer Evolution 9 of Tony Quinn and Klark Quinn finished in second place with another Lancer Evolution 9 in third, driven by Jim Pollicina and Dean Kelland.

The race was run over two days and had two legs, each one scheduled to be eighty laps and 250km in length. However, due to stoppages and delays on each day while other categories were running, the Saturday leg was shortened to 73 laps and the Sunday leg to 60 laps. The first leg was won by John Bowe and Peter O'Donnell in a BMW 335i while Kostera and Tulloch won the second leg and the race overall.

== Class Structure ==
- Class A – Extreme Performance
- Class B – High Performance
- Class C – Performance Touring
- Class D – Production Touring
- Class E – Compact Touring
- Class I – Invitational

== Results ==
Results were as follows:

Pos	Drivers	No.	Vehicle	Team	Class	Laps
1	Stuart Kostera; Ian Tulloch	1	Mitsubishi Lancer Evolution X	Team Mitsubishi Ralliart Performance	A	133
2	Tony Quinn; Klark Quinn	29	Mitsubishi Lancer Evolution IX	VIP Petfoods	A	133
3	Jim Pollicina; Dean Kelland	7	Mitsubishi Lancer Evolution IX	Poll Performance	A	133
4	Dylan Thomas; Dave Thomas	68	Mitsubishi Lancer Evolution IX	CXC Global	A	132
5	Cameron Wilson; Peter Burnitt	25	Subaru Impreza WRX STi	Go Karting Gold Coast	A	132
6	Peter O'Donnell; John Bowe	28	BMW 335i	GWS Personnel	B	131
7	Jake Camilleri; Scott Nicholas	36	Mazda 3 MPS	Grand Prix Motorsport	C	130
8	Garth Duffy; Matthew Hayes	26	BMW 130i	GWS Personnel	C	130
9	Beric Lynton; Mathew MacKeldon	23	Mini Cooper S	Bruce Lynton Mini Garage	I	126
10	Brendon Cook; John Modystach	2	Mini Cooper S	Abbey Cranes	I	125
11	Richard Mork; Jake Williams	21	Honda Integra	Disc Brakes Australia	D	125
12	Matt McGill; Geoff Brunsdon	75	Toyota Celica	Weldmaster	D	121
13	Grant Phillips; Andrew Turpie; Daryl Martin	77	Proton Satria GTi	Pedders Suspension	E	118
14	Hadrian Morrall; David Gyuni	31	Mazda 3 MPS	Osborne Motorsport	C	118
15	Rob Jarvis; Michael Gray	17	Suzuki Swift Sport	Toasted Motorsport	E	118
Ret	Allan Jarvis; Morgan Haber	27	Suzuki Swift Sport	Toasted Motorsport	E	113
Ret	Barton Mawer; Jeremy Gray	10	FPV F6	International Energy Services	B	80
Ret	Declan Kirkham; Phil Kirkham	71	Ford Fiesta	Inertia Apparel	D	79
Ret	Colin Osborne; Ric Shaw	13	Mazda 3 MPS	Osborne Motorsport	C	61
Ret	Greg Symes; Glenn Seton	93	Mitsubishi Lancer Evolution IX	Symes Coaches	A	61
Ret	Ryan McLeod; Gerrard McLeod	20	HSV VXR	Racer Industries	C	42
