= Milestones... 20 Years =

Greatest hits album by Adam Brand
- Released: 13 July 2018
- Recorded: 1998–2018
- Genre: Country
- Label: Adam Brand, ABC Music, Universal Music Australia

Adam Brand chronology
Get On Your Feet (2017)	Milestones... 20 Years (2018)	Speed of Life (2020)

Singles from Milestones... 20 Years
- 1. "Milestones" Released: 20 April 2018

Milestones... 20 Years is the third compilation and second greatest hits album by Australian recording artist Adam Brand. The album was released on 13 July 2018 and marks the twenty-year anniversary of Brand's debut self-titled studio album and consists of Brand's greatest hits and fan favourites. Milestones... 20 Years peaked at number 6 on the ARIA charts.

The album was supported by the "Milestones... 20 Years" seven month national tour, commencing in Scone, NSW on 27 April 2018 and finishing in Murchison, VIC on 18 November 2018.

== Track listing ==
Disc 1
No.	Title	Writer(s)	Length
1.	"Milestones"		3:35
2.	"Party Down Under"		3:16
3.	"King of the Road"	Adam Brand	3:27
4.	"Last Man Standing"	Brand	3:17
5.	"Grandpa's Piano"		3:23
6.	"Dirt Track Cowboys"	Brand	2:53
7.	"Good Friends"		3:43
8.	"Good Things in Life"		3:46
9.	"I Did What?"		2:52
10.	"New England Highway"		3:42
11.	"The Anzac"		4:51
12.	"She's Country"		3:42
13.	"Get Loud"		3:54
14.	"Cigarettes & Whiskey"		3:38
15.	"Get on Down the Road"		3:10
16.	"Comin' From / Khe Sanh"	Brand, Sam Hawksley, Don Walker	4:13
17.	"Blame It on Eve"		3:43

Disc 2
No.	Title	Length
1.	"Ready for Love"	3:55
2.	"Hell of a Ride"	3:56
3.	"It's Gonna Be OK"	3:00
4.	"She Got Away"	2:57
5.	"I Was Here"	3:21
6.	"There Will Be Love"	3:22
7.	"Freedom Rebels"	3:29
8.	"Hearts I Leave Behind"	3:14
9.	"My Side Of The Street"	3:08
10.	"Good Year for the Outlaw" (credited to Adam Brand and the Outlaws)	3:34
11.	"If Heaven Has a Soundtrack"	4:08
12.	"Drunk"	3:20
13.	"Get On Your Feet"	3:00
14.	"For Ever and Ever Amen"	3:33
15.	"Hold My Hand"	3:31
16.	"Hard Times"	4:20
17.	"Sheriff Bullfrog"	5:29

== Charts ==
=== Weekly charts ===
Chart (2018)	Peak position
Australian Albums (ARIA)	6
Australian Country Albums (ARIA)	1

=== Year-end charts ===
Chart (2018)	Peak position
Australian Country Albums (ARIA)	25

== Release history ==
Region	Date	Format	Edition(s)	Label	Catalogue
Australia	13 July 2018	CD; Digital Download; streaming	Standard	Adam Brand, ABC Music, Universal Music Australia	6752416
