= Deep Zone =

Deep Zone by refer to:

- Deep Zone (Dutch music project), a Dutch house project famous for the 1995 hit "It's Gonna Be Alright"
- Deep Zone Project, Bulgarian musical project
