= Adam Brand (explorer) =

German merchant and explorer (died 1746)

Adam Brand (before 1692 in Lübeck – 1746 in Königsberg) was a German merchant and explorer. He was born in Lübeck and undertook several trading journeys to Moscow.

In 1692, Russian tsar Peter I entrusted Eberhard Isbrand Ides with a mission to the Kangxi Emperor of China. Brand accompanied him as secretary of the embassy. Ides and his mission, which consisted of more than 250 noblemen, advisors, merchants and soldiers, reached Beijing, the capital city of the Empire, in 1693, after 18 months of travel. The main achievement of the embassy was that the Russians were allowed to carry business in Beijing with a caravan of maximum 200 members every three years.

In 1697, Brand was made court councillor and commercial councillor (Hofrath and Commerzienrath, respectively), which were honorary titles bestowed by the Prussian state. Although he had been chosen to act as Prussian envoy to Persia, the death of King Frederic I of Prussia in 1713 led to this project never being materialised.

He then went to reside at Königsberg where he ended his days in 1746.

== Work ==
Brand is the author of one of the two eyewitness accounts existing on Eberhard Isbrand Ides' journey to China (the other one was written by Ides himself). His report, written in German, to which was added an opuscule by H. W. Ludolff entitled "Curieuse Beschreibung der natürlichen Dingen Rußlands" (Curious observations concerning the products of Russia), was first published in the year 1698 in Hamburg. This report became extremely popular in Western Europe. It was quickly translated into various European languages including English (1698 and 1707), French (1699) and Dutch (1699).Versions of it were also included in English (1705) and Spanish (1701) collections of travels and voyages. Brand sent an extract from his manuscript to Leibniz who translated it into Latin and inserted it in his work Novissima Sinica (1697).

== List of works ==
- Beschreibung Der Chinesischen Reise (1698)

== Translations ==
=== Into English ===
- A Journal of the Embassy from Their Majesties John and Peter Alexievitz (1698)

=== Into French ===
- Relation du voyage de Mr Evert Isbrand, envoyé de Sa Majesté czarienne à l'empereur de Chine, en 1692, 93 et 94 (1699)

=== Into Dutch ===
- Seer aenmercklijcke Land- en Water-Reys, Onlanghs gedaen van't Gesantschap sijner tegenwoordigh-regeerende Czarsche Majesteyt uyt Muscouw na China, onder desselven Ambassadeur de Heer Isbrand, door Groot-Ustiga, Sibeien, Dauren, Mongalisch Tattaryen, &c (1699)
