= Wild Ride =

Studio album by Steve Forde
- Released: July 2004
- Recorded: Nashville, Tennessee
- Genre: Country
- Label: ABC Music

Steve Forde chronology
Livin Right (2002)	Wild Ride (2004)	Rowdy (2006)

Wild Ride was the second album released by Steve Forde and the Flange it was a follow-up to Livin Right and had three singles.

== Track listing ==
1. The Old Days
2. Drinking Things Over
3. Another Man
4. That's My Life
5. You & Me
6. The Letter
7. Upstream
8. Head Over Heels
9. Beer & Women
10. Catch Me If You Can
11. That Too

== Singles ==
- Another Man
- Beer & Women
- The Letter
