= Blame It on Eve =

Studio album by Adam Brand
- Released: 21 January 2008
- Recorded: Nashville, Tennessee, Sydney
- Genre: Country
- Length: 47:46
- Labels: Compass Brothers, Universal Music Australia
- Producer: Graham Thompson

Adam Brand chronology
What a Life (2006)	Blame It on Eve (2008)	Greatest Hits 1998–2008 (2008)

Blame It on Eve is the seventh studio album by Australian recording artist Adam Brand. The album was released in January 2008 and peaked at number 10 on the ARIA charts; becoming Brand's first top ten album.

== Reception ==
Professional ratings
Review scores
Source	Rating
AllMusic	3.5/5 stars

Stewart Mason from AllMusic said "Brand's rough-hewn brand of country, rooted in honky tonk and the '70s outlaws, lacks the gloss necessary to make it onto mainstream country radio, but those raised on Waylon Jennings may find this to their liking. Highlights include the swaggering "Get on Down the Road," powered by a vintage-sounding organ part, and the wry title track, which compares favorably to some of John Hiatt's work. Brand's agreeably rough-edged voice is instantly appealing, and there's nothing about good-timey, twangy tunes like "Nothing Like a Good Day" and the Jimmy Buffett-like near-Caribbean lilt of "Simple Man"".

== Track listing ==
No.	Title	Length
1.	"Get on Down the Road"	3:10
2.	"Proof Enough"	3:07
3.	"Blame It on Eve"	3:43
4.	"Nothing Like a Good Day"	3:21
5.	"Comin' From/Khe Sanh"	4:13
6.	"Not So Strong"	3:49
7.	"Down Home"	2:51
8.	"Wasted Day"	2:24
9.	"Better Than This"	3:12
10.	"Waiting on Sunshine"	3:57
11.	"Simple Man"	2:07
12.	"What We Do to Ourselves"	3:28
13.	"Right Here with You"	3:32
14.	"Angels"	4:52
15.	"Spirit of the Bush (bonus track)" (with Lee Kernaghan and Steve Forde)	3:34

== Charts ==
=== Weekly charts ===
Chart (2008)	Peak position
Australian Albums (ARIA)	10
Australian Country Albums (ARIA)	2
Australian Artist Albums (ARIA)	2

=== Year-end charts ===
Chart (2008)	Position
Australia Country Albums (ARIA)	13

== Release history ==
Region	Date	Format	Edition(s)	Label	Catalogue
Australia	21 January 2008	CD; Digital Download	Standard	Compass Brothers, Universal Music Australia	041CDCB
