= Steve Forde (album) =

Studio album by Steve Forde
- Released: 16 September 2007
- Genre: Country
- Label: ABC Music
- Producer: Richard Landis

Steve Forde chronology
Rowdy (2006)	Steve Forde (2007)	Guns & Guitars (2008)

Steve Forde is the first solo album by Australian Country music star Steve Forde which is both a greatest hits CD and has brand new content. The CD produced two singles both of which reached the number one position on the CMC request charts.

== Track listing ==
=== Standard edition ===
1. Summer's Little Angel
2. Metropolis
3. Beer And Women
4. Dust
5. Drinking Things Over
6. The Letter
7. Another Man
8. Rodeo Freak
9. Captain Good Times
10. Crazy Love
11. That's What I'm Talking About
12. Life's Getting In The Way Of Living

=== Limited edition CD/DVD ===
==== Disc one ====
1. Summer's Little Angel
2. Metropolis
3. Beer And Women
4. Dust
5. Drinking Things Over
6. The Letter
7. Another Man
8. Rodeo Freak
9. Captain Good Times
10. Crazy Love
11. That's What I'm Talking About
12. Life's Getting In The Way Of Living

==== Disc two ====
The second disc is a DVD which contains film clips of the following songs:

1. Aussie Philosophy
2. Rodeo Freak
3. The Letter
4. Another Man
5. That Too (Live At The Deni Ute Muster)
6. You Shook Me All Night Long (Live At The Deni Ute Muster)

== Singles ==
- Metropolis
- Summer's Little Angel

== Charts ==
Chart (2007)	Peak position
Australian Albums (ARIA Charts)	59
