= Cavanagh Bus Group =

Australian bus operator

Cavbus Group
- Parent: Cavanagh family
- Commenced operation: 1952 (Cavbus formed in 2001, Cavglass in 2007)
- Headquarters: Logan Village, Queensland
- Service area: Scenic Rim Region; Brisbane; Sunshine Coast
- Service type: Bus & coach operator
- Depots: 3
- Fleet: 115 (February 2018)
- Website: www.logancoaches.com.au

The Cavbus Group is an Australian operator of bus companies in South East Queensland.

== Cavanagh's Bus Service ==
In March 1952, Clyde and Clare Cavanagh entered a partnership with Wilfred Ryan to purchase three buses from King's Bus Co with services in Kempsey. The Cavanaghs later bought Ryan out and in 1965 purchased a further route from King's. In 1967, Cavanagh's Bus Service commenced operating camping tours throughout Australia.

In 1991, McKay's Bus Service was purchased followed by Mercury Roadlines in 1996. In 2002, a subsidiary was established in Port Macquarie under the Portbus brand. From January 2003 until December 2007, Cavanagh's operated services from Newcastle to Taree and Port Macquarie to Wauchope under contract to CountryLink. As at July 2017, the fleet consisted of 56 vehicles.

In July 2017, the Kempsey operation was acquired by Victorian operators Dineen Group. In February 2018, the Port Macquarie operation was acquired by the McGrady family.

== Cavbus ==
In 2001, Cavbus was formed when Cavanagh's purchased the Beaudesert Bus Service and Logan Coaches businesses from Jim Hill. As at February 2018, the fleet consisted of 84 vehicles.

Depots are operated in Beaudesert, Ipswich and Logan Village.

=== Cavglass ===
In 1998, Glasshouse Country Coaches, Glass House Mountains was purchased by Jim Hill. In June 2007, the business was purchased by the Cavanagh's. As at August 2017, the fleet consisted of 29 vehicles.
