= Ceybil Jefferies =

American contemporary R&B singer (1962–2020)

- Born: Sybil Jefferies; November 28, 1962; Brooklyn, New York, U.S.
- Died: April 9, 2020 (aged 57) Brooklyn, New York, U.S.
- Genres: House; R&B; new jack swing
- Occupation: Singer
- Instrument: Vocals
- Years active: 1990s (first album)–2000s
- Labels: Atlantic Records; Scotti Brothers Records
- Formerly of: Salaam Remi; Deep Zone

Ceybil Jefferies (November 28, 1962 – April 9, 2020), also known by the stage name Sweet Sable, was an American house and R&B vocalist best known for her work during the 1990s, including the 1996 Dutch house single, "It's Gonna Be Alright" with Deep Zone, which hit No. 20 on the Billboard Dance Club Songs chart. Her other best known singles include "Love So Special" and "Open Your Heart", both of which reached the top 20 of the Billboard Dance Club Songs chart in 1991. Jefferies, who sometimes went by the stage name Sweet Sable beginning in 1994, often changed the spelling of her name or reinvented it, depending on the release. Variations of her name included Ceybil, Sable Jefferies, her birthname Sybil Jefferies, and Ceybil Jeffries.

== Biography ==
Born Sybil Jefferies, she was a native of Brooklyn, New York.

She initially signed with Atlantic Records, which released her debut album, Let Music Take Control in 1991. Two singles from the album, "Love So Special" and "Open Your Heart," were both top 20 hits on the Billboard Dance Club Songs chart that same year.

Prior to the release of her sophomore album, Open Your Heart, Jefferies left Atlantic Records to sign with Scotti Brothers Records under the new artist name "Sable Jefferies". The first single from the album, "Friends (For Old Time Sake)," was more heavily influenced by the new jack swing genre, rather than her earlier house music work. "Friends (For Old Time Sake)" proved successful by reaching No. 15 on the Billboard R&B chart and No. 2 on the Billboard Bubbling Under Hot 100 chart. Shortened to "Old Time's Sake," her song was included on the Above the Rim film soundtrack in 1994 under her moniker Sweet Sable.

The album also spawned two other singles, "Tonight" and "Love Thang," which both landed on the Billboard R&B chart. "Love Thang" reached No. 1 on the former Billboard Hot Dance Breakdowns chart in 1995, beating out Usher's "Think of You", which peaked at No. 2 behind Jefferies' song.

In 1996, she collaborated with Dutch house group Deep Zone to provide vocals for the single, "It's Gonna Be Alright" under her original name Ceybil Jefferies. "It's Gonna Be Alright" peaked at No. 20 on the Dance Club Songs chart. In a review at the time, Larry Flick from Billboard described the song as "a joyfully optimistic romp merging edgy house beats with keyboards that are, by turns, jazzy and retro-disco. Life in the urban lane has done wonders for Jefferies' voice, which is now far more assured and smooth."

Jefferies continued to record and release music into the 2000s. However, she was diagnosed with neurosarcoidosis, an inflammatory type of sarcoidosis that severely affected her lungs and breathing capacity. Her diagnosis effectively ended her singing career. Additionally, Jefferies lost much of her vision due to the illness.

Jefferies died from COVID-19 in April 2020 in her hometown of Brooklyn. Her death was announced and confirmed by music industry colleagues on April 10, 2020, including record producer Salaam Remi.
