= It's Gonna Be OK =

It's Gonna Be OK may refer to:

- It's Gonna Be OK (album), an album by Australian singer Adam Brand
  - "It's Gonna Be OK" (Adam Brand song), a single from the album
- "(It’s Gonna Be) Okay", a song by The Piano Guys from their 2016 album Uncharted
  - Also on the 2020 album Music... The Air That I Breathe by Cliff Richard (with The Piano Guys)

== See also ==
- Everything's Gonna Be Okay, American comedy television series created by comedian Josh Thomas
- "You're Gonna Be OK", a song by Jenn Johnson from 2017 album by Brian & Jenn Johnson from their first album After All These Years
