= Martyrs Bus Service =

Bus operator in Melbourne, Australia

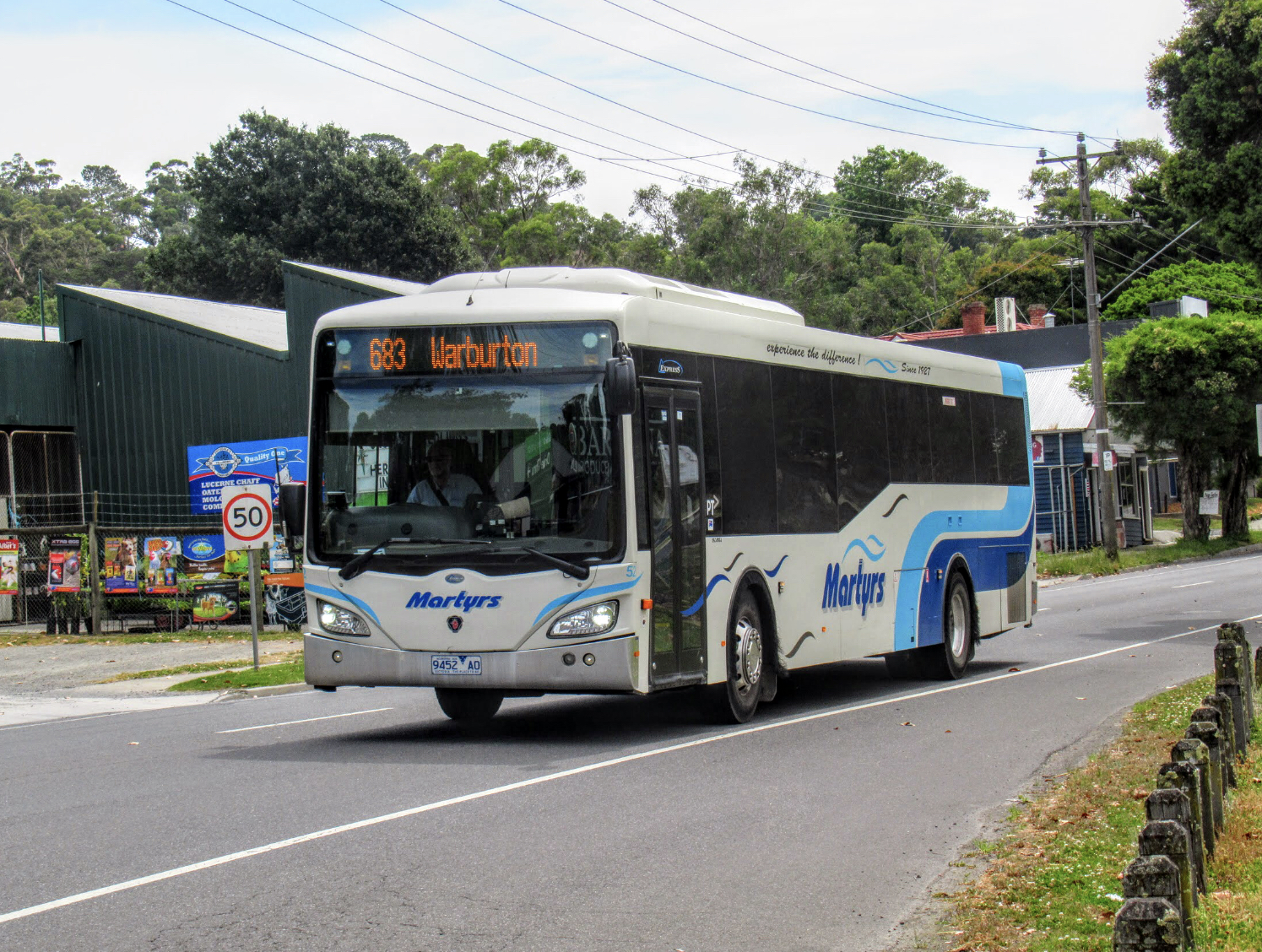
- Express Coach Builders bodied Scania K310UB in April 2020
- Parent: Dineen Group
- Commenced operation: July 1927
- Headquarters: Warburton
- Service area: Eastern Melbourne
- Service type: Bus operator
- Routes: 1
- Fleet: 42 (November 2022)
- Website: www.martyrs.com.au

Martyrs Bus Service is a bus operator in Melbourne, Australia. It operates one route under contract to Public Transport Victoria. It is a subsidiary of the Dineen Group.

== History ==
Martyrs Bus Service was formed in July 1927 by Harry Martyr who commenced a bus service from Warburton to the Melbourne central business district. Hornibrook Bus Lines proprietor Geoff Mountjoy purchased the business in 1979.

In September 1990, the Chirnside Park Shopping Centre to Melbourne central business district portion of route 683 ceased. In December 2001 the original depot in the main street was replaced by one in East Warburton. The original depot was turned into a museum. In November 2011, the Dineen Group purchased Martyrs Bus Service.

== Fleet ==
As at November 2022, the fleet consisted of 42 buses and coaches. Fleet livery is white with light and dark blue stripes.
