= 2010 Eastern Creek 8 Hour Production Car Race =

Layout of the Eastern Creek Raceway

The 2010 Eastern Creek 8 Hour Production Car Race was an endurance motor race for production cars. It was staged on 12 December 2010 at the Eastern Creek International Raceway in New South Wales, Australia. Jim Hunter, Barton Mawer and Gavin Bullas won the race at the wheel of a Subaru Impreza WRX STI; completing 249 laps, one more than the second place team of Barry Morcom, Nathan Morcom and Garry Holt, driving a BMW 335i. Third place went to father and son pairing Tony and Klark Quinn, who finished ten laps down from the winners, in a Mitsubishi Lancer Evolution IX.

== Eligibility ==
The race was open to production based cars complying with the technical regulations for any one of the following:

- CAMS Group 3E Production Cars
- New Zealand Production Racing
- FIA Group N Production Cars
- Hong Kong Touring Car Championship (Super Production 2000cc class)

== Classes ==
The race featured five classes:

- Class A:
- Class B:
- Class D: Production Sports Cars up to 2 Litres
- Class E:
- Class F:

Names for classes other than Class D are not known.

== Results ==
Position	Drivers	No.	Vehicle	Team	Class	Laps
1	Jim Hunter; Barton Mawer; Gavin Bullas	77	Subaru Impreza WRX STi	Jim Hunters Motorsport	A	249
2	Barry Morcom; Nathan Morcom; Garry Holt	11	BMW 335i	Morcom Motorsport	B	248
3	Tony Quinn; Klark Quinn	29	Mitsubishi Lancer Evo IX	VIP Petfoods	A	239
4	Terry Conroy; Bob Hughes; Gerry Burges	21	Honda Integra Type R	Disc Brakes Australia	D	238
5	Richard Gartner; Francious Jouy; Keen Booker; Carl Schembri	97	Renault Clio 197	Safe-T-Shop	D	234
6	Paul Nelson; Justin Matthews; Bob Holden; Greg Kean	16	Toyota Yaris	Bezcorp Security	E	221
7	Ian Thorp; Aaron Thorp; M Heffernan	13	Renault Clio RS	R-Sport Australia	D	208
8	David Filipetto; Nathan Gotch; Glenn Smith	147	Alfa Romeo 147	David Filipetto Consulting Services	F	47
DNF	Mark King; Anton Mechtler; Jason Walsh	38	Mitsubishi Lancer Evo X	Pro-Duct Motorsport	A	191
DNF	Trover Keene; Phil Alexander; G Heath	50	Mini Cooper S	Midwest Multimedia	D	171
DNF	Bob Pearson; Steve Glenney	33	Mitsubishi Lancer Evo X	Pro-Duct Motorsport	A	150
DNF	Glenn Seton; Neil Crompton	35	Mitsubishi Lancer Evo X	Pro-Duct Motorsport	A	135
DNF	Chris Reeves; C Colbey; Anthony Soole	000	HSV Clubsport R8	Triple Zero Racing	B	117

== See also ==
- 2011 Eastern Creek Six Hour
- Motorsport in Australia
