= Snowliner Coaches =

- Parent: Dineen Group
- Founded: October 1964
- Headquarters: Cooma
- Service area: Snowy Mountains
- Depots: 1
- Fleet: 14 (May 2023)
- Website: www.snowliner.com.au

Snowliner Coaches is an Australian bus company operating services in the Snowy Mountains region of New South Wales, Australia. It is a subsidiary of the Dineen Group.

== History ==
Snowliner Coaches was founded in October 1964 when John Evans purchased the Cooma to Nimmitabel school contract from Freebody's Alpine Bus Lines. In 1979 it commenced opearring a Canberra to Bega service. This ceased in January 1990 after CountryLink introduced a service with subsidised fares. From 1980 until July 1983 it operated a Bega to Bairnsdale service under contract to Ansett Pioneer.

In February 1983, it purchased the Cooma to Berridale school services from Ansett Pioneer. In February 1990, it commenced operating a Cooma to Bombala under contract to CountryLink. In May 1992, it purchased the Cooma to Jindabyne from Deane's. In January 2017, the business was sold to the Dineen Group.

== Fleet ==
As at May 2023, the fleet comprised 14 vehicles.
