= Rowdy (Steve Forde album) =

Studio album by Steve Forde
- Released: January 2006
- Recorded: Dallas, Texas; Arlington, Texas; Nashville, Tennessee; Australia
- Genre: Country
- Label: ABC Music

Steve Forde chronology
Wild Ride (2004)	Rowdy (2006)	Steve Forde (2007)

Rowdy was the third and final album by Steve Forde & The Flange. The band split, but Forde went on to record two more albums and is still active.

== Track listing ==
1. "No Wrong"
2. "Feels Alright"
3. "Aussie Philosophy"
4. "The Ride"
5. "Goin' & Blowin'"
6. "Crazy Love"
7. "Captain Goodtime"
8. "All I Need"
9. "Everybody Else"
10. "Bare Backin'"
11. "QLD Song"
12. "Cowboy Style" (featuring Vanilla Ice)

== Singles ==
- "No Wrong"
- "Aussie Philosophy"
