= 2011 Phillip Island Six Hour =

Layout of the Phillip Island Grand Prix Circuit

The 2011 Phillip Island Six Hour was an endurance motor race for production cars. It was held on 29 May 2011 at the Phillip Island Grand Prix Circuit in Phillip Island, Victoria, Australia. It was Round 2 of the 2011 Australian Manufacturers' Championship, Round 2 of the 2011 Australian Production Car Championship and Round 1 of the 2011 Australian Production Car Endurance Championship. The race was won by Stuart Kostera and Ian Tulloch, driving a Mitsubishi Lancer Evolution X. The Mazda 3 MPS of Jake Camilleri and Scott Nicholas finished a lap down in second with the Lancer Evolution 9 of Jim Pollicina, Dean Kelland and Steve Cramp a further lap down in third.

== Class Structure ==
- Class A – Extreme Performance
- Class B – High Performance
- Class C – Performance Touring
- Class D – Production Touring
- Class E – Compact Touring
- Class I – Invitational

== Results ==
Results were as follows:

Pos	Drivers	No.	Vehicle	Team	Class	Laps
1	Stuart Kostera; Ian Tulloch	1	Mitsubishi Lancer Evolution X	Team Mitsubishi Ralliart Performance	A	183
2	Jake Camilleri; Scott Nicholas	36	Mazda 3 MPS	Grand Prix Motorsport	C	182
3	Jim Pollicina; Dean Kelland; Steve Cramp	7	Mitsubishi Lancer Evolution 9		A	181
4	Ryan McLeod; Jason Bright	20	HSV VXR		C	180
5	Barry Morcom; Garry Holt; Nathan Morcom	11	BMW 335i	Eastern Creek Karts	B	180
6	Beric Lynton; Tom Pickett	23	Mini Cooper S	Bruce Lynton Mini Garage	I	175
7	Peter O'Donnell; John Bowe	28	BMW 335i	GWS Personnel	B	175
8	Brendon Cook; Matt Mackelden	2	Mini Cooper S	Abbey Cranes	I	174
9	Garth Duffy; Keane Booker	26	BMW 130i	GWS Personnel	C	170
10	Hadrian Morrall; Rob Jones	31	Mazda 3 MPS	Osborne Motorsport	C	166
11	Declan Kirkham; Phil Kirkham	71	Ford Fiesta	Inertia Apparel	D	162
12	Matthew Holt; Brett Howard; Anthony Loscialpo	65	HSV GTS		B	162
13	Grant Phillips; Andrew Turpie; Daryl Martin	77	Proton Satria GTi	Pedders Suspension	E	161
14	Matt McGill; Geoff Brunsdon	75	Toyota Celica	Crown and Marks	D	160
15	Maddison Gray; Ashley Quddington	15	Toyota Echo	LGM & American Made Cycles	E	160
16	Lauren Gray; Jake Williams	5	Toyota Corolla	LGM & Holton Spares	D	160
Ret	Dylan Thomas; Ryan Simpson	68	Mitsubishi Lancer Evolution X	CXC Team Stinger	A	142
Ret	Colin Osborne; Rick Bates	13	Mazda 3 MPS	Osborne Motorsport	C	139
Ret	Barton Mawer; Jeremy Gray	10	FPV F6	International Energy Services	B	121
Ret	Cameron Wilson; Peter Burnitt	25	Subaru Impreza WRX STi	Go Karting Gold Coast	A	97
Ret	Richard Gartner; Carl Schembri; Francios Jouy*	97	Renault Clio	Safe-T-Stop	D	62

* – driver did not drive car in race.
