= My Acoustic Diary =

Studio album by Adam Brand
- Released: 8 November 2013
- Genre: Country
- Length: 55:50
- Labels: Adam Brand Enterprises, ABC Music

Adam Brand chronology
There Will Be Love (2012)	My Acoustic Diary (2013)	My Side of the Street (2014)

My Acoustic Diary is the eleventh studio album by Australian recording artist Adam Brand. The album sees Brand perform acoustic reinterpretations of 13 songs from his career spanning from 1998 to 2013 and two new tracks. It was released on 8 November 2013 and peaked at number 31 on the ARIA charts.

== Background ==
In 2013, Brand signed with a new record label, ABC Music, with Brand saying "I felt like it was a time to start a new chapter in my life, a bit of a fresh start." In August 2013, Brand told Gympie Times his next album would be an acoustic one. Brand said "I'm going to be going through all the songs from my very first album right up to the recent one. There are some songs there that are quite pivotal, even though it may not have been a single or a hit, but for me it meant something." Brand added the album will reflect the early forms many of his songs had as he wrote them. "Most of them were written on a couch in someone's lounge room. I definitely want it to be that kind or organic feeling, just like we're sitting around with a cuppa in the lounge room, probably in our jammies."

== Reception ==
Professional ratings
Review scores
Source	Rating
Renowned for Sound	4/5 stars

Ben Ryan from Renowned for Sound said "To say that most tracks on My Acoustic Diary are simply re-recorded versions of the old stuff is an oversimplification. Instead, the tunes have been redone acoustically, or in a broken down form at least, giving them new life and new character." adding "Adam Brand has remained faithful to his work, and loyal to his listeners, presenting versions that are just as, if not more, appealing than the originals."

== Track listing ==
No.	Title	Length
1.	"Freedom Rebels"	3:29
2.	"Gone Fishin'"	3:03
3.	"Dirt Track Cowboys"	2:54
4.	"Last Man Standing"	3:35
5.	"Good Things in Life"	4:22
6.	"New England Highway"	4:25
7.	"The Anzac"	5:13
8.	"That's Who We Are"	3:33
9.	"Just Drive"	4:32
10.	"Kinda Like It"	2:57
11.	"Better Than This"	3:17
12.	"Nothin' Like a Good Day"	3:44
13.	"Wondering"	3:53
14.	"Hell of a Ride"	4:03
15.	"It's Gonna Be Ok"	2:50

== Charts ==
=== Weekly charts ===
Chart (2013)	Peak position
Australian Albums (ARIA)	31
Australian Country Albums (ARIA)	1
Australian Artist Albums (ARIA)	8

=== Year-end charts ===
Chart (2012)	Position
Australia Country Albums (ARIA)	29

== Release history ==
Region	Date	Format	Edition(s)	Label	Catalogue
Australia	8 November 2013	CD; Digital Download	Standard	Adam Brand Enterprises, ABC Music	3756928
