= Speed of Life (Adam Brand album) =

Studio album by Adam Brand
- Released: 13 March 2020
- Genre: Country
- Label: ABC Music, UMA
- Producer: Luke Wooten

Adam Brand chronology
Milestones... 20 Years (2018)	Speed of Life (2020)

Singles from Speed of Life
- 1. "Life's Been Good to Me" Released: 16 August 2019; 2. "Speed of Life" Released: October 2019; 3. "Freakin' Weekend" Released: 31 January 2020; 4. "You Are Not Alone" Released: 6 March 2020

Speed of Life is the fifteenth studio album by Australian musician Adam Brand. The album was released on 13 March 2020. The album debuted at number 6 on the ARIA Charts.

Brand said the whole experience of making this album was "a vastly different experience to all the other albums" he has made. He said "It was a calm and stress free process and I put that down to the place in life I'm at. I felt no pressure in putting this album together... no urgency to find that big hit song... to be honest I let my heart guide me this time, and my heart was full of the wonderful notion of my baby girl who was about to be born. I whole heartedly believe she gave me that calmness and clarity in knowing what I wanted to sing about this time around."

== Track listing ==
Speed of Life track listing
No.	Title	Length
1.	"Speed of Life"	3:02
2.	"Life's Been Good to Me"	2:56
3.	"Fly"	3:14
4.	"Messin' Up a Good Thing"	3:35
5.	"Freakin' Weekend"	3:16
6.	"Just a Love Song"	3:33
7.	"Baby I Miss You"	3:41
8.	"You Are Not Alone" (with Casey Donovan)	3:25
9.	"Don't Wanna Let You Down"	3:46
10.	"Time of Our Lives"	3:18

== Charts ==
Sales chart performance for Speed of Life
Chart (2020)	Peak position
Australian Albums (ARIA)	6

== Release history ==
Release formats for Speed of Life
Region	Date	Format	Label	Catalogue
Australia	13 March 2020	CD; digital download; streaming	ABC Music, Universal Music Australia	7788035
