= My Side of the Street =

Studio album by Adam Brand
- Released: 8 August 2014
- Genre: Country
- Length: 42:26
- Labels: Adam Brand Enterprises, ABC Music
- Producers: Adam Brand, Craig Porteils

Adam Brand chronology
My Acoustic Diary (2013)	My Side of the Street (2014)	Adam Brand and the Outlaws (2016)

My Side of the Street is the twelfth studio album by Australian recording artist Adam Brand. The album was released on 8 August 2014 and peaked at number 5 on the ARIA charts. Upon release Brand said "I went into the studio this time around with no rulebook whatsoever. I just went in there with the songs that spoke to me the most, and with no pre-conceived ideas as to how it was supposed to sound."

Brand toured the album commencing in Sale, Victoria on 3 September 2014 and ending in Ravenswood, Queensland on 19 October 2014.

The album was nominated for Best Country Album at the ARIA Music Awards of 2014 This is Brand's fifth ARIA Award nomination in this category.

== Reception ==
Professional ratings
Review scores
Source	Rating
The Music	3/5 stars

Sebastian Skeet from The Music said "Brand walks a fine line between country and straight-out pop. Fans of Brand will enjoy the brash guitars and raspy vocals on tracks like "My Side of the Street" and the single "What Your Love Looks Like", which is a long way from traditional country. It's not until midway through that we get to hear the twang of country on "Girls These Days" and "Put 'em On Me"". Skeet added "The less said about the cover of Billy Thorpe's signature tune the better."

== Track listing ==
No.	Title	Writer(s)	Length
1.	"My Side of the Street"	Jack Williams, Travis Meadows	3:09
2.	"Doing It"	Joe West, Meadows	2:39
3.	"What Your Love Looks Like"	Aaron Benward, Andrew Dorff, Kyle Jacobs, Kylie Sackley	3:38
4.	"One Can Be a Lot"	Annie Tate, Dave Berg, Sam Tate	3:44
5.	"Under the Sun"	Adam Brand, David Lee, Tony Lane	3:46
6.	"Stupid What I Do to Me"	Barry Dean, Meadows	3:21
7.	"Put 'em On Me"	David Lee Murphy, Frankie Ballard	3:15
8.	"Girls These Days"	Ben Hayslip, Rivers Rutherford	3:15
9.	"Hearts I Leave Behind"	Nick Sturms, Meadows	3:14
10.	"Right On the Money"	Cale Dodds, Corey Crowder	2:42
11.	"Quit This Time" (featuring Jasmine Rae)	Brand, Enderlin	3:32
12.	"Bet Your Mama"	Chuck Cannon	3:04
13.	"Most People I Know Think That I'm Crazy"	Billy Thorpe	3:07

== Charts ==
My Side of the Street is Brand's second top five on the ARIA Albums chart, following on from There Will Be Love in August 2012. The album also gives Brand his fourth No.1 on the ARIA Country Albums chart.

=== Weekly charts ===
Chart (2014)	Peak position
Australian Albums (ARIA)	5
Australian Country Albums (ARIA)	1
Australian Artist Albums (ARIA)	3

=== Year-end charts ===
Chart (2014)	Position
Australia Country Albums (ARIA)	21

== Release history ==
Region	Date	Format	Edition(s)	Label	Catalogue
Australia	8 August 2014	CD; Digital Download	Standard	Adam Brand Enterprises, ABC Music	3789170
