= Right to life (disambiguation) =

Right to life is a phrase that describes the belief that a human being has an essential right to live.

Right to life may also refer to:

- Right to Life Australia, an organisation that opposes abortion, euthanasia and stem cell research
- Right to Life New Zealand, a Christchurch-based anti-abortion group
- National Right to Life Committee, American anti-abortion organization
- New York State Right to Life Party, a minor American political party
