= What a Life (Adam Brand album) =

Studio album by Adam Brand
- Released: August 2006
- Studio: Sound Emporium (Nashville, Tennessee)
- Genre: Country
- Length: 51:27
- Label: Compass Brothers, Sony Music Australia

Adam Brand chronology
Christmas in Australia (2005)	What a Life (2006)	Blame It on Eve (2008)

What a Life is the sixth studio album by Australian recording artist Adam Brand. The album was released in August 2006 and peaked at number 28 on the ARIA charts. It was certified gold in 2006.

The album was nominated for Best Country Album at the ARIA Music Awards of 2006 This is Brand's fourth ARIA Award nomination in this category.

== Track listing ==
No.	Title	Writer(s)	Length
1.	"Kinda Like It"	Adam Brand, David Lee Murphy	3:12
2.	"Open Ended Heartache"	Travis Meadows	4:03
3.	"Life Will Bring You Home"	Brand, Michael Carr	4:15
4.	"Party Till the Money's All Gone"	Brand, Murphy	2:48
5.	"Can't Live Without Your Love"	Brand, Bobby Terry	3:29
6.	"That Changes Everything"	Tony Lane	4:03
7.	"My Boots"		3:59
8.	"The Bug"	Jess Leary, Andy Karg, Rich Karg	3:10
9.	"Cigarettes and Whiskey"		3:38
10.	"What a Life"		4:43
11.	"Settle Down"		3:24
12.	"Drive It Till the Wheels Fall Off"	Brand, Terry	3:44
13.	"The Lucky One"	Meadows	6:59
14.	"Open Ended Heartache" (video clip)	Meadows	3:40

== Charts ==
=== Weekly charts ===
Chart (2006)	Peak position
Australian Albums (ARIA)	28
Australian Country Albums (ARIA)	2

=== Year-end charts ===
Chart (2006)	Position
Australia (ARIA) Country Albums Chart	13

== Certifications ==
Region	Certification	Certified units/sales
Australia (ARIA)	Gold	35,000^{^}
^{^} Shipments figures based on certification alone.

== Release history ==
Region	Date	Format	Edition(s)	Label	Catalogue
Australia	August 2006	CD; Digital download	Standard	Compass Brothers, Sony Music Australia	024CDCB
