= Greatest Hits 1998–2008 =

Greatest hits album by Adam Brand
- Released: 8 September 2008
- Genre: Country
- Length: 71:38
- Labels: Compass Brothers, Shock Records

Adam Brand chronology
Blame It on Eve (2008)	Greatest Hits 1998–2008 (2008)	Hell of a Ride (2009)

Greatest Hits 1998–2008 is the first greatest hits album by Australian recording artist Adam Brand. The album was released on 8 September 2008 and peaked at number 68 on the ARIA charts.

== Track listing ==
No.	Title	Writer(s)	Length
1.	"Last Man Standing"	Adam Brand	3:13
2.	"Grandpa's Piano"	Vernon Rust	3:22
3.	"Dirt Track Cowboys"	Brand	2:52
4.	"Good Friends"		3:41
5.	"Beating Around the Bush"		3:14
6.	"Good Things in Life"		3:43
7.	"I Did What?"		2:49
8.	"New England Highway"		3:40
9.	"The Anzac"		4:40
10.	"That Was Us"		3:23
11.	"Old Hands"		4:04
12.	"Get Loud"		3:47
13.	"She's Country"		3:35
14.	"This Time of Year"		3:52
15.	"Open Ended Heartache"	Travis Meadows	3:59
16.	"Can't Live Without Your Love"	Brand, Bobby Terry	3:26
17.	"Cigarettes & Whiskey"		3:33
18.	"That Changes Everything"	Tony Lane	3:59
19.	"Blame It on Eve" (acoustic)		3:38
20.	"Dirt Track Cowboys '08"	Brand	2:59

== Charts ==
=== Weekly charts ===
Chart (2008)	Peak position
Australian Albums (ARIA)	68
Australian Country Albums (ARIA)	2
Australian Artist Albums (ARIA)	18

=== Year-end charts ===
Chart (2008)	Position
Australia Country Albums (ARIA)	30

== Release history ==
Region	Date	Format	Edition(s)	Label	Catalogue
Australia	8 September 2008	CD; Digital Download	Standard	Compass Brothers, Shock Records	053CDCB
