= Eberhard Isbrand Ides =

Holstein merchant, traveler and diplomat

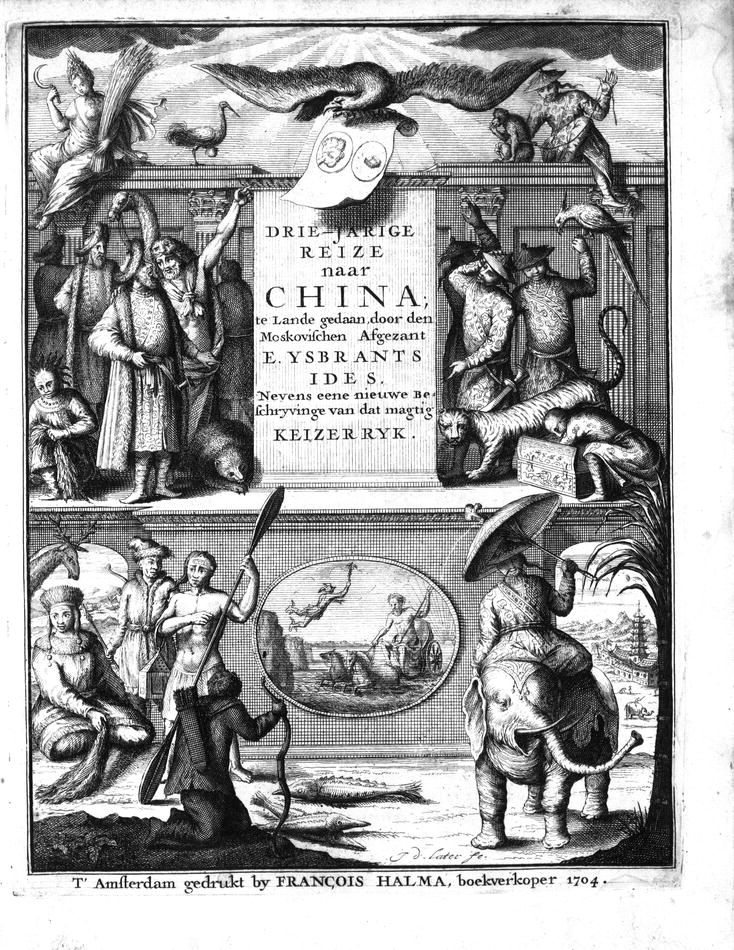
Drie-jarige Reize naar China - Title page (1704)

Eberhard Isbrand Ides, Nouvelle carte de l'empire de Russie

Eberhard Isbrand Ides or Evert Ysbrants (Ysbrandszoon) Ides (1657–1708) was a Holstein merchant, traveller and diplomat.

== Biography ==
Of Dutch descent, Evert IJsbrandsz Ides came from Holstein-Glückstadt. He began trading on Russia in 1677. By 1687, he settled in the German Quarter (Nemetskaya sloboda) of Moscow. In 1692, after the Treaty of Nerchinsk, he travelled as an envoy to the Kangxi Emperor of China, accompanied by nine Russians and twelve Germans. He made use of a map presented by Nicolaas Witsen. While there he was to negotiate trade relations between the two countries. He returned to Russia in 1694 and seems to have been sent to Voronezh to assist with the development of a Russian Navy. In 1698 he founded an arms and powder factory near Moscow. In 1700 he became a commissioner of the Admiralty in Arkhangelsk and in 1704 administrator of export tariffs for Arkhangelsk.

Ides was one of the first early Europeans to describe the Gobi Desert. In 1697, Dreijährige Reise Nach China, a German language description of the trip was published by Adam Brandt, his former secretary, with descriptions of Siberia and Northern China. In 1701 Ides decided to publish a map of his travels because of the competition. In 1704 his richly decorated Driejaarige Reize naar China, te lande gedaan door de Moscovischen afgezant E. Ysbrants Ides was published in Dutch; two years later in English. His account appeared in French translation, along with a work by another Dutch traveller Cornelis de Bruijn (1652–1727) in Voyage de Corneille Le Brun par la Moscovie, en Persia, et aux Indes Orientales (6 parts in 2 volumes), published in Amsterdam in 1718.

== Sources ==
- "Избрантес, Эверт-Идес" . Brockhaus and Efron Encyclopedic Dictionary (in Russian). 1906.
