= There Will Be Love =

Studio album by Adam Brand
- Released: 10 August 2012
- Recorded: Nashville, Tennessee
- Genre: Country
- Length: 44:18
- Labels: Arista Nashville, Sony Music Australia

Adam Brand chronology
You're a Revhead (2011)	There Will Be Love (2012)	My Acoustic Diary (2013)

There Will Be Love is the tenth studio album by Australian recording artist Adam Brand. The album was released on 10 August 2012 and peaked at number 4 on the ARIA charts; Brand's highest-charting album.

Upon release, Brand told Troy Culpan "I like to think of it as an album of hope... I mean we all go through things in our life, we go through ups and downs and twists and turns that life throws at you and sometimes you can come out of the other end of it feeling cynical, or you can come out of it feeling hopeful and for me that's what the album represents - being hopeful."

== Track listing ==
No.	Title	Length
1.	"There Will Be Love"	3:20
2.	"I Was Here"	3:21
3.	"Looking Like Never"	3:34
4.	"Feel the Fire"	3:40
5.	"Wake Up Loving You"	3:39
6.	"Some Just Live"	4:01
7.	"Gods and Angels"	3:25
8.	"This Round's On Me"	3:41
9.	"Come On"	3:16
10.	"She Got Away"	2:57
11.	"Tom Petty"	2:44
12.	"Unafraid"	3:31
13.	"Faith in You"	3:09

== Charts ==
=== Weekly charts ===
Chart (2012)	Peak position
Australian Albums (ARIA)	4
Australian Country Albums (ARIA)	1
Australian Artist Albums (ARIA)	2

=== Year-end charts ===
Chart (2012)	Position
Australia Country Albums (ARIA)	15
Australian Artist Albums (ARIA)	50

== Release history ==
Region	Date	Format	Edition(s)	Label	Catalogue
Australia	10 August 2012	CD; Digital Download	Standard	Arista Nashville, Sony Music Australia	88725413452
