= Christmas in Australia (album) =

Studio album by Adam Brand and Friends
- Released: 10 October 2005
- Genre: Country
- Labels: Compass Brothers, Universal Music Australia

Adam Brand albums chronology
Get Loud (2004)	Christmas in Australia (2005)	What a Life (2006)

Christmas in Australia is the fifth studio album and first Christmas album by Australian recording artist Adam Brand; credited to Adam Brand and Friends. The album was released in October 2005 and came with a bonus 8-track live disc.

== Track listing ==
Christmas in Australia track listing
No.	Title	Writer(s)	Length
1.	"Santa's Gonna Come on a Surfboard" (by Adam Brand)	Buck Owens, Red Simpson	2:21
2.	"My Birthday Comes on Christmas" (by Adam Brand)	Lou Busch, Léon Pober	2:18
3.	"Aussie Jingle Bells" (by The Sunny Cowgirls)	Colin Buchanan	2:39
4.	"Get Your Gear Off" (by Adam Brand)	John Vincent	2:36
5.	"Funny Little Fat Guy" (by Dianna Corcoran)	Genni Kane, John Kane	3:37
6.	"My Mum and Santa" (by Adam Brand)		2:31
7.	"Christmas Photo" (by The Sunny Cowgirls)	John Williamson	3:19
8.	"Nuttin' for Christmas" (by Adam Brand)	Sid Tepper, Roy C. Bennett	2:19
9.	"Owyagoin' Santa Claus" (by Jim Haynes)	John Vincent	2:21
10.	"All I Want for Christmas Is My Two Front Teeth" (by Adam Brand)	Donald Yetter Gardner	2:07
11.	"Ate Too Much for Christmas" (by The Sunny Cowgirls)	Geoff Mack	2:32
12.	"Here Comes Santa Claus" (by Adam Brand)	Gene Autry	2:29
13.	"One Candle" (By Adam Brand)	Brendon Walmsley	4:02

Bonus Live Disc
No.	Title	Writer(s)	Length
1.	"Uncle Pete"	Brand	3:35
2.	"Last Man Standing"	Brand, Clive Young	3:18
3.	"Old Hands"	Max D. Barnes	4:15
4.	"That Was Us"	Tony Lane, Craig Wiseman	3:27
5.	"Good Things in Life"	Brand, Graeme Connors	3:47
6.	"Built for Speed"	Brand, Bob Regan	3:15
7.	"New England Highway"	Brand, Michael Carr	3:40
8.	"Dirt Track Cowboys"	Brand	3:55

== Charts ==
Chart (2005)	Peak position
Australian Country Albums (ARIA)	2

== Release history ==
Region	Date	Format	Edition(s)	Label	Catalogue
Australia	10 October 2005	CD; Digital download	Standard	Compass Brothers, Universal Music Australia	021CDCB
