= Get Loud (album) =

Studio album by Adam Brand
- Released: August 2004
- Genre: Country
- Labels: Compass Brothers, Sony Music Australia

Adam Brand chronology
Built for Speed (2002)	Get Loud (2004)	Christmas in Australia (2005)

Get Loud is the fourth studio album by Australian recording artist Adam Brand. The album was released in August 2004 and peaked at number 16 on the ARIA charts. It was certified gold in 2005.

The album was nominated for Best Country Album at the ARIA Music Awards of 2004

== Track listing ==
No.	Title	Length
1.	"We're Making' Up"	3:03
2.	"Infinity"	4:04
3.	"Get Loud"	3:54
4.	"Number 34"	2:54
5.	"This Time of Year"	3:58
6.	"Food, Water, Shelter, Love"	3:16
7.	"Eighteen"	3:25
8.	"Cowboy Tequila"	4:00
9.	"Impossible to Do"	4:42
10.	"Lifetime Friends"	2:52
11.	"Just Drive"	4:41
12.	"Senoritas"	3:47
13.	"Come On Home"	4:16
14.	"She's Country"	3:40

== Charts ==
=== Weekly charts ===
Chart (2004)	Peak position
Australian Albums (ARIA)	16
Australian Country Albums (ARIA)	2

=== Year-end charts ===
Chart (2004)	Position
Australia Country Albums (ARIA)	11

== Certifications ==
Region	Certification	Certified units/sales
Australia (ARIA)	Gold	35,000^{^}
^{^} Shipments figures based on certification alone.

== Release history ==
Region	Date	Format	Edition(s)	Label	Catalogue
Australia	August 2004	CD; Digital download	Standard	Compass Brothers, Sony Music Australia	017CDCB
