= Get on Your Feet (album) =

Get On Your Feet

Studio album by Adam Brand
- Released: 10 February 2017
- Recorded: Nashville, Tennessee, Sydney, Australia
- Genre: Country
- Length: 32:57
- Labels: Adam Brand Enterprises, ABC Music

Adam Brand chronology
Adam Brand and the Outlaws (2016)	Get On Your Feet (2017)	Milestones... 20 Years (2018)

Get On Your Feet is the fourteenth studio album by Australian recording artist Adam Brand. The album was released on 10 February 2017 and peaked at number 7 on the ARIA charts.

Upon announcement, Brand said "I was ready to make new songs that redefined boundaries. I was looking for great songs that I wanted to press ‘repeat’ on when I was driving in the car – songs that I could listen to over and over again". In an interview with Amnplify Brand said "I wanted to feel good at the end of it. I wanted to have a big grin on my face and feel positive and uplifted. I wanted it to be fun."

Brand supported the album with a national tour starting in Tamworth on 28 January 2017 and ending in Redland Bay on 4 June 2017.

== Reception ==
Professional ratings
Review scores
Source	Rating
FairFax Media	2/5 stars

Bernard Zuel from Fairfax Media hosted an album conversation and criticised the lyrical content, giving the album 2 out of 5. Rod Yates from Rolling Stone thought the album was Keith Urban-ish but said the lyrics were "disastrous". Lindsay McDonald thought the music sounded like "computerised 90s" while Danielle McGrane from Australian Associated Press was "astounded" by "how out of date, out of touch and how utterly sexist" the lyrics are "to the extent they sound like a parody".

In a positive review, Working Bull website said "The Get On Your Feet album and tour are a breath of fresh air to Australia's country music scene. I guess spending time in Nashville, Adam Brand has brought back a mix of Florida Georgia Line, Jason Aldean and Keith Urban to Australia. Push boundaries and blazing new trails for the Australian Country Music scene and upcoming artists. All with that cheeky and much loved Brand charm!"

== Track listing ==
No.	Title	Length
1.	"Every Time She Walks By"	3:14
2.	"Get On Your Feet"	2:58
3.	"Why Can't Love Be Easy"	2:42
4.	"Leave It On"	3:28
5.	"Drunk"	3:18
6.	"When You Get Lonely"	3:45
7.	"Rest of Your Night"	2:53
8.	"Around a Campfire"	3:21
9.	"Rent Money"	3:10
10.	"If Heaven Has a Soundtrack"	4:08

== Charts ==
=== Weekly charts ===
Chart (2017)	Peak position
Australian Albums (ARIA)	7
Australian Country Albums (ARIA)	1
Australian Artist Albums (ARIA)	2

=== Year-end charts ===
Chart (2017)	Position
Australia Country Albums (ARIA)	41

== Release history ==
Region	Date	Format	Edition(s)	Label	Catalogue
Australia	10 February 2017	CD; Digital Download; Streaming	Standard	Adam Brand Enterprises, ABC Music	5727619
