= Good Friends (Adam Brand album) =

Studio album by Adam Brand
- Released: March 2000
- Genre: Country
- Label: Compass Brothers, Festival Mushroom Records
- Producer: Graham Thompson

Adam Brand chronology
Adam Brand (1998)	Good Friends (2000)	Built for Speed (2002)

Good Friends is the second studio album by Australian recording artist Adam Brand. The album was released in March 2000 and peaked at number 26 on the ARIA charts. It was certified platinum in 2006.

The album was nominated for Best Country Album at the ARIA Music Awards of 2000.

In January 2001, Good Friends won Brand two Country Music Awards; Album of the Year, Male Vocalist of the Year and "Good Things in Life" won APRA Song of the Year as the same award ceremony.

== Track listing ==
No.	Title	Writer(s)	Length
1.	"Big Old Car"	Don Walker	2:30
2.	"When the Needle Hits the Vinyl"	Neil Thrasher, Bob Regan & Michael Delaney	3:34
3.	"Good Friends"	Don Walker & Miles Walker	3:43
4.	"You Are to Me"	Don Schlitz, Billy Livsey	3:12
5.	"I Did What?"	Jackson Leap	2:52
6.	"Beating Around the Bush"	Wayne Burt & Adam Brand	3:19
7.	"Little Sisters"	Adam Brand, Colin Buchanan & Juliana Grace	3:08
8.	"Good Things in Life"	Adam Brand & Graeme Connors	3:46
9.	"When I Get My Wheels"	Adam Brand	3:36
10.	"Little Girl"	Don Walker	4:22
11.	"Every Man Likes You"	Adam Brand & Craig Wiseman	3:21
12.	"You're a Revhead"	Adam Brand & Colin Buchanan	4:02
13.	"One More Time Tonight"	Adam Brand	2:47
Total length:			41:25

== Charts ==
Chart (2000)	Peak position
Australian Albums (ARIA)	26
Australian Country Albums (ARIA)	3

== Certifications ==
Region	Certification	Certified units/sales
Australia (ARIA)	Platinum	70,000^{^}
^{^} Shipments figures based on certification alone.

== Release history ==
Region	Date	Format	Edition(s)	Label	Catalogue
Australia	March 2000	CD; Cassette	Standard	Compass Brothers, Festival Mushroom Records	D32188
