= Adam Brand and the Outlaws =

2016 studio album

Studio album by Adam Brand and the Outlaws
- Released: 8 January 2016
- Recorded: 2015
- Genre: Country
- Length: 47:35
- Labels: Adam Brand Enterprises, ABC Music

Adam Brand and the Outlaws chronology
My Side of the Street (2014)	Adam Brand and the Outlaws (2016)	Get On Your Feet (2017)

Adam Brand and the Outlaws is the thirteenth studio album by Australian recording artist Adam Brand; this one credited to Adam Brand and the Outlaws. The outlaws consists of Australian country musicians Drew McAlister, Travis Collins, Matt Cornell and Mike Carr. The album was released on 8 January 2016 and peaked at number 6 on the ARIA charts. The album was supported by a national tour commencing in Tamworth on 22 January 2016 and concluding in Rooty Hill on 19 March 2016. Additional festival dates were added with the group's last performance at the Deni Ute Muster in September 2016. The album spawned two singles; "Good Year for the Outlaw" and "I Fought the Law".

The album was nominated for Best Country Album at the ARIA Music Awards of 2016

== Background and release ==
In August 2015, at the Gympie Music Muster Adam Brand was joined onstage by Drew McAlister, Travis Collins, Matt Cornell and Mike Carr and called themselves Adam Brand and the Outlaws. The "Outlaw" being a reference to Willie Nelson, Waylon Jennings, Johnny Paycheck and Johnny Cash all of which Brand calls "outlaws in their time". Brand said “When it came to putting a list together of people that would suit this Outlaw band, it didn't take very long. These guys are all great mates, have amazing talent and occasionally cross the line — perfect!” Brand said “We were so excited, like a bunch of kids on graduation day. Put together, we've all, done thousands of gigs but that one, you could have thought it was our first time on stage. We were so pumped and it was really nice. It was a great feeling to be that excited as a group of guys to be hitting the stage.” Shortly after, the newly formed group recorded and album and announced an Australian tour.

== Reception ==
Professional ratings
Review scores
Source	Rating
Renowned for Sound	4/5 stars

Jessica Thomas from Renowned for Sound called the album a "party playlist exploding with covers from some of the best" and said "Adam Brand and The Outlaws is big album, tackling some of the biggest names in the rock/country industry, all crafted with their distinct voice. As an album its got belter after belter, but in its consistency it lacks a touch of originality. While it would have really rounded out the tunes to have some fresh material amongst these classics, as a party playlist you wont be left disappointed.". Lauren from Sounds of Oz said "So many of these song choices didn't make sense to me on paper, but hearing them I realised I'd judged too quickly." She called the album "A collection of familiar songs reinterpreted in such interesting ways. They're not dramatically different enough to alienate fans of the originals, but the band's definitely breathed new life into these classics from the worlds of country and rock music."

== Track listing ==
No.	Title	Writer(s)	Length
1.	"Good Year for the Outlaw"	Adam Brand and the Outlaws	3:34
2.	"Nothin' but a Good Time"	Bret Michaels, C.C. DeVille, Bobby Dall, Rikki Rockett	3:25
3.	"Sounds of Then"	Mark Callaghan	3:36
4.	"Six Days on the Road"	Earl Green, Carl Montgomery	2:48
5.	"Working Class Man"	Jonathan Cain	3:06
6.	"It's Five O'Clock Somewhere"	Jim Brown, Don Rollins	3:36
7.	"I Fought the Law"	Sonny Curtis	3:04
8.	"Mammas Don't Let Your Babies Grow Up to Be Cowboys"	Ed Bruce, Patsy Bruce	3:28
9.	"Are You Gonna Be My Girl"	Nic Cester, Cameron Muncey	3:39
10.	"Fat Bottomed Girls"	Brian May	3:35
11.	"Way Out West"	The Dingoes	3:53
12.	"Bad Case of Loving You"	Moon Martin	3:15
13.	"Take This Job and Shove It"	David Allan Coe	3:26
14.	"Good Riddance (Time of Your Life)"	Billie Joe Armstrong, Mike Dirnt, Tré Cool	3:10

== Charts ==
=== Weekly charts ===
Chart (2016)	Peak position
Australian Albums (ARIA)	6
Australian Country Albums (ARIA)	1
Australian Artist Albums (ARIA)	1

=== Year-end charts ===
Chart (2016)	Position
Australia Country Albums (ARIA)	41
Australian Artist Albums (ARIA)	36

== Release history ==
Region	Date	Format	Edition(s)	Label	Catalogue
Australia	8 January 2016	CD; Digital Download; Streaming	Standard	Adam Brand Enterprises, ABC Music	4753300
