= Livin' Right (album) =

Studio album by Steve Forde
- Released: May 24, 2008 (re-release)
- Recorded: Nashville, Tennessee
- Genre: Country
- Label: ABC Music

Steve Forde chronology
Livin' Right (2002)	Wild Ride (2004)

Livin Right is the debut album from Steve Forde & The Flange, and was first released in 2002 and then re-released in 2008.

== Track listing ==
1. "Roughstock Riders"
2. "Chasin' The Sun"
3. "Give It All"
4. "Livin' Right"
5. "First Thing On My Mind"
6. "In The Stars"
7. "What I'm Talkin' About"
8. "Rodeo Freak"
9. "One Day At A Time"
10. "Modern Day Outlaw"
11. "Something I'm In Love With"
12. "She Shines"

== Singles ==
"What I'm Talking About" was the first single from the album, whilst "Rodeo Freak" was the second single release and reached number 1 on the CMC chart.
