= Hell of a Ride =

Studio album by Adam Brand
- Released: 6 March 2009
- Recorded: Fool on the Hill Recording, Nashville, Tennessee
- Genre: Country
- Length: 44:09
- Labels: Compass Brothers, Shock Records
- Producer: Richard Landis

Adam Brand chronology
Greatest Hits 1998–2008 (2008)	Hell of a Ride (2009)	It's Gonna Be OK (2010)

Hell of a Ride is the eighth studio album by Australian recording artist Adam Brand. The album was released in March 2009 and peaked at number 19 on the ARIA charts. The album includes the track "Ready for Love" which peaked at umber 46 on the Billboard Hot Country Songs in 2010. This is Brand's only US charting single to date.

At the AIR Awards of 2009, the album won Best Independent Country Album.

== Track listing ==
No.	Title	Length
1.	"Hell of a Ride"	3:56
2.	"Kissing the Phone"	3:32
3.	"Wondering"	4:14
4.	"Ready for Love"	3:55
5.	"Blue Sky Cathedral"	3:34
6.	"Crazy Like That"	3:57
7.	"That's a Man"	4:01
8.	"Thump"	2:53
9.	"Some Dreams"	3:01
10.	"Letting Go"	3:30
11.	"Stupid Today"	3:31
12.	"Yesterday Was Beautiful"	4:05

== Charts ==
=== Weekly charts ===
Chart (2009)	Peak position
Australian Albums (ARIA)	19
Australian Country Albums (ARIA)	2
Australian Artist Albums (ARIA)	5

=== Year-end charts ===
Chart (2009)	Position
Australia Country Albums (ARIA)	9
Australia Artist Albums (ARIA)	49

== Release history ==
Region	Date	Format	Edition(s)	Label	Catalogue
Australia	6 March 2008	CD; Digital Download	Standard	Compass Brothers, Shock Records	064CDCB
