= It's Gonna Be Alright (Deep Zone song) =

1995 single by Deep Zone

Single by Deep Zone
- B-side: "Remix"
- Released: 1995
- Genre: Disco; house
- Length: 3:42
- Label: Outland Records; Sub-Urban
- Songwriters: Ceybil Jefferies; L. Powell; Mike Delgado; Matthias Heilbronn
- Producers: Mike Delgado; Matthias Heilbronn

Deep Zone singles chronology
"It's Gonna Be Alright" (1995)	"Praise Him (Lift Your Hands Up!)" (1996)

Music video
- "It's Gonna Be Alright" on YouTube

"It's Gonna Be Alright" (also known as "It's Gonna Be Alright (Help is on the Way)") is a song by Dutch house project Deep Zone featuring vocals by American singer Ceybil Jefferies. Released in 1995, it became a big club anthem and a chart success in Europe, peaking at number seven in Belgium and number 20 in the Netherlands. Outside Europe, it peaked at number-one in Israel in May 1996, and at number 20 on the Billboard Hot Dance Club Play chart in the US.

In 2020, Tomorrowland voted "It's Gonna Be Alright" number 110 in their official list of "The Ibiza 500".

== Background ==
Mattias Heilbronn of Deep Zone told Michael Paoletta of Billboard magazine about how the song was made, "I had been talking to Ceybil about doing a song together. So I gave her a tape of the track. Within one day, she had written the lyrics. The next day she came into the studio and recorded the song in two takes. That record happened so quickly and quite by chance, really."

== Critical reception ==
Larry Flick from Billboard described the song as "a joyfully optimistic romp merging edgy house beats with keyboards that are, by turns, jazzy and retro-disco." He added, "Life in the urban lane has done wonders for Jeffries' voice, which is now far more assured and smooth." Brad Beatnik from Music Week's RM Dance Update rated it four out of five, writing, "It features a wicked, subtle bassline which is cleverly incorporated into deep, upfront, disco and garage styles across the many mixes. The vocal keeps it soulful throughout and there's definitely something here for everyone."

Upon the 1996 re-release, the magazine gave it four out of five, noting, "Already big in Europe, this uplifting house anthem has some wonderful mixes including Farley & Heller's, but the DJ Guan mix is the one to get the hands in the air." Michael Morley from Muzik stated that "this is a very classy outing with several particularly notable ingredients. The vocals are clear and forceful, there's some sterling keyboard work and the strong arrangement is a fascinating series of peaks and troughs."

== Music video ==
A music video was produced to promote the single, depicting Ceybil Jeffries singing while she is holding two horses, one on each side of her. Other scenes show the singer performing in a desert landscape with some camels. In between, there are black and white shots of youth hanging out on the street in a city and also some sepia toned footage of old people gathering.

== Track listing ==
- 12", Italy
1. "It's Gonna Be Alright" (Boris Dlugosch & Mousse T's Club Path – 6:50
2. "It's Gonna Be Alright" (The Deep Zone Mix – 10:46
3. "It's Gonna Be Alright" (Farley & Heller's Fire Island Vocal – 10:09
4. "It's Gonna Be Alright" (DJ Guan's Club Mix – 7:38
- CD single, France
1. "It's Gonna Be Alright" (DJ Guan's Radio Mix – 3:48
2. "It's Gonna Be Alright" (Club Illusions' Trance Mix – 6:33
3. "It's Gonna Be Alright" (DJ Guan's Club Mix – 7:38
- CD maxi, Germany
1. "It's Gonna Be Alright" (DJ Guan's Radio Mix – 3:48
2. "It's Gonna Be Alright" (Boris Dlugosch & Mousse T.'s Club Mix – 6:48
3. "It's Gonna Be Alright" (DJ Guan's Club Mix – 7:38
4. "It's Gonna Be Alright" (Farley & Heller's Fire Island Vocal – 10:24
5. "It's Gonna Be Alright" (Club Illusions' Trance Mix – 7:28
6. "It's Gonna Be Alright" (Typar & Atbe's Radio Mix – 3:23
- CD maxi, Netherlands
1. "It's Gonna Be Alright" (DJ Guan's Radio Mix – 3:52
2. "It's Gonna Be Alright" (Club Illusions' Trance Mix – 6:34
3. "It's Gonna Be Alright" (DJ Guan's Club Mix – 7:40
4. "It's Gonna Be Alright" (The Mike And Matty Show – 10:45

== Charts ==
=== Weekly charts ===
Chart (1995–96)	Peak position
Belgium (Ultratop Flanders)	7
Belgium (Ultratop Wallonia)	14
Israel (Israeli Singles Chart)	1
Netherlands (Dutch Top 40)	20
Netherlands (Single Top 100)	25
US Dance Club Songs (Billboard)	20
US Hot Dance Breakouts Club Play (Billboard)	2

=== Year-end charts ===
Chart (1996)	Position
Belgium (Ultratop Flanders)	39
Belgium (Ultratop Wallonia)	56
Israel (Israeli Singles Chart)	32
