= You're a Revhead =

Compilation album by Adam Brand
- Released: 27 May 2011
- Recorded: 1998–2011
- Genre: Country
- Length: 61:42
- Label: Compass Brothers, Shock Records
- Producer: Graham Thompson

Adam Brand chronology
It's Gonna Be OK (2010)	You're a Revhead (2011)	There Will Be Love (2012)

You're a Revhead is the second compilation album by Australian recording artist Adam Brand, featuring 17 "revhead" songs. The album was released on 27 May 2011 and came with a bonus DVD featuring 8 video clips. You're a Revhead peaked at number 39 on the ARIA Charts.

== Track listing ==
Disc 1
No.	Title	Writer(s)	Length
1.	"Dirt Track Cowboys"	Adam Brand	2:54
2.	"Number 34"	Byron Hill	2:50
3.	"King of the Road"	Brand	3:24
4.	"You're a Revhead"	Brand, Colin Buchanan	3:59
5.	"Built for Speed"	Brand, Bob Regan	3:45
6.	"When I Get My Wheels"	Brand	3:34
7.	"Big Old Car"	Don Walker	2:28
8.	"Dirt Racer"	Brand, Wade Aunger, Glen Hannah	4:12
9.	"Beating Around the Bush"	Brand, Wayne Burt	3:15
10.	"Just Drive"	Brand, Michael Carr	4:40
11.	"Nothin's Gonna Slow Me Down"	Brand, David Lee Murphy	4:24
12.	"That Was Us"	Tony Lane, Craig Wiseman	3:25
13.	"Drive till the Wheels Fall Off"	Brand, Bobby Terry	3:42
14.	"Get On Down the Road"	Murphy, Rivers Rutherford, Chuck Wicks	3:10
15.	"Comin' From / Khe Sahn"	Brand, Sam Hawksley, Walker	4:14
16.	"455 Rocket" (bonus track)	David Rawlings, Gillian Welch	4:06
17.	"Born To Be Wild" (bonus track)	Mars Bonfire	3:40

Bonus DVD
No.	Title	Writer(s)	Length
1.	"Dirt Track Cowboys"	Adam Brand
2.	"Beating Around the Bush"	Brand, Burt
3.	"You're a Revhead"	Brand, Buchanan
4.	"When I Get My Wheels"	Brand
5.	"Built for Speed"	Brand, Regan
6.	"That Was Us"	Lane, Wisemane
7.	"Get On Down the Road"	Murphy, Rutherford, Wicks
8.	"Comin' From / Khe Sahn"	Brand, Hawksley, Walker

== Charts ==
=== Weekly charts ===
Chart (2011)	Peak position
Australian Albums (ARIA)	39
Australian Country Albums (ARIA)	3
Australian Artist Albums (ARIA)	7

=== Year-end charts ===
Chart (2011)	Peak position
Australian Country Albums (ARIA)	32

== Release history ==
Region	Date	Format	Edition(s)	Label	Catalogue
Australia	27 May 2011	CD; Digital Download	CD/DVD	Compass Brothers, Shock Records	080CDCB
Australia	31 August 2012	CD; Digital Download	CD	Compass Brothers, EMI Music Australia	
