= Built for Speed (Adam Brand album) =

Studio album by Adam Brand
- Released: January 2002
- Genre: Country
- Labels: Compass Brothers, Festival Mushroom Records
- Producer: Graham Thompson

Adam Brand chronology
| Good Friends (2000) | Built for Speed (2002) | Get Loud (2004) |

Built for Speed is the third studio album by Australian recording artist Adam Brand. The album was released in January 2002 and peaked at number 24 on the ARIA charts. It was certified platinum in 2009.

== Track listing ==
| No. | Title | Length |
|---|---|---|
| 1. | "New England Highway" | 3:41 |
| 2. | "I'm Going To Venus" | 3:34 |
| 3. | "The Anzac" | 4:49 |
| 4. | "That Was Us" | 3:26 |
| 5. | "Dirt Racer" | 4:12 |
| 6. | "That's Who We Are" | 4:14 |
| 7. | "Built for Speed" | 3:47 |
| 8. | "Nothing's Gonna Slow Me Down" | 4:25 |
| 9. | "Old Hands" | 4:08 |
| 10. | "I Thank the Good Lord" | 3:29 |
| 11. | "Smile" | 3:59 |
| 12. | "Nah, I Don't Think So" | 4:21 |
| 13. | "Stitches" | 3:40 |

Limited Edition Bonus CD
| No. | Title | Writer(s) | Length |
|---|---|---|---|
| 1. | "Beating Around the Bush" (live) |
| 2. | "I Did What?" (live) |
| 3. | "Good Things in Life" (live) |
| 4. | "You're a Revhead)" (live) |
| 5. | "Dirt Track Cowboy" (live) |
| 6. | "I Still Call Australia Home" (live) | Peter Allen |

== Charts ==
=== Weekly charts ===
| Chart (2002) | Peak position |
|---|---|
| Australian Albums (ARIA) | 24 |
| Australian Country Albums (ARIA) | 2 |

=== Year-end charts ===
| Chart (2002) | Position |
|---|---|
| Australia (ARIA) Country Albums Chart | 10 |

== Certifications ==
| Region | Certification | Certified units/sales |
|---|---|---|
| Australia (ARIA) | Platinum | 70,000^{^} |
^{^} Shipments figures based on certification alone.

== Release history ==
| Region | Date | Format | Edition(s) | Label | Catalogue |
|---|---|---|---|---|---|
| Australia | January 2002 | CD | Standard | Compass Brothers, Festival Mushroom Records | 334855 |
