= It's Gonna Be OK (album) =

Studio album by Adam Brand
- Released: 20 August 2010
- Genre: Country
- Length: 46:33
- Labels: Compass Brothers, Shock Records

Adam Brand chronology
| Hell of a Ride (2009) | It's Gonna Be OK (2010) | You're a Revhead (2011) |

It's Gonna Be OK is the ninth studio album by Australian recording artist Adam Brand. The album was released in August 2010 and peaked at number 11 on the ARIA charts. Additionally, It's Gonna Be OK became Brand's first No.1 on the ARIA Country chart.

== Reception ==
Professional ratings
Review scores
| Source | Rating |
|---|---|
| AllMusic | 3.5/5 stars |

Alexey Eremenko from AllMusic said "It's Gonna Be OK effectively blurs the line between country, heartland rock and the pop that made Bryan Adams a superstar in the late '80s." adding "The record is an enjoyable romp through arena-sized rockers and lighter, soft pop ballads, enlivened by a couple clever interludes such as the fiddle-driven "The Worm" or a couple of rockabilly-like tunes deeper into the album."

== Track listing ==
| No. | Title | Writer(s) | Length |
|---|---|---|---|
| 1. | "It's Gonna Be OK" | Adam Brand, Travis Meadows | 3:00 |
| 2. | "Kiss You Back" | Brand, Barry Dean, Meadows | 3:13 |
| 3. | "Dance with Me" | Victoria Banks, Johnny Reid, Tia Sillers | 3:57 |
| 4. | "The Worm" | Brand, Tony Mullins | 4:19 |
| 5. | "Unafraid to Love" | Brand, Mark Stephen Jones, Meadows | 4:44 |
| 6. | "I Surrender" | Brand, Jones, Meadows | 3:31 |
| 7. | "The Reason I Come Home" | Brand, Meadows | 3:50 |
| 8. | "Gettin' Good" | Brand, Meadows, Michael Carr | 3:09 |
| 9. | "Greatest Love Song" | Brand, Jones, Meadows | 3:32 |
| 10. | "You Came True" | Brand, Jones, Meadows | 3:36 |
| 11. | "Lie Lie Lie" | Brand, Jones, Meadows | 3:03 |
| 12. | "That's Everything" | Brand, Erin Enderlin, Sam Hawksley | 3:20 |
| 13. | "Beautiful Excuses" | Brand, Jones, Meadows, Cache Reed | 3:19 |

== Charts ==
=== Weekly charts ===
| Chart (2010) | Peak position |
|---|---|
| Australian Albums (ARIA) | 11 |
| Australian Country Albums (ARIA) | 1 |
| Australian Artist Albums (ARIA) | 7 |

=== Year-end charts ===
| Chart (2010) | Position |
|---|---|
| Australia Country Albums (ARIA) | 21 |

== Release history ==
| Region | Date | Format | Edition(s) | Label | Catalogue |
|---|---|---|---|---|---|
| Australia | 20 August 2010 | CD; Digital Download | Standard | Compass Brothers, Shock Records | 077CDCB |
