= Steve Forde =

Australian country music artist (born 1977)

Steve Forde is an Australian country music artist and host of Rollin with... on the Country Music Channel.

== Biography ==
=== Early years ===
Steve Forde was born in the regional farming centre of Cowra, New South Wales in 1977. Steve spent most of his early childhood moving from town to town across NSW with his family. He is a singer, a songwriter and a touring country star. Although retired now, Steve was a successful bull rider and bareback bronc rider.

At 18 years old, Ford joined his first band and tasted the life of a touring country musician. It was also during this time that Forde decided that he wanted to join the rodeo as a bull rider.

When he left for the United States in 1998 he joined a country band in Texas and toured through Colorado, South Dakota and into Canada. When the gigs were lean he would work in bars, building fences or riding bareback broncos in Lubbock, Texas.

Steve returned to Australia when his father needed help on the farm; he continued with the rodeos during weekends. He bought his farm, near Grenfell, New South Wales and set about getting it cleaned up, stocked up and productive while still helping at his father's farm; and finding time to continue riding broncos.

=== 2000-present: Recording years ===
In 2000, Steve started his band The Flange whose debut album Livin' Right was released in May 2002. At the 2003 Country Music Awards of Australia, the band were nominated in two categories. The single "What I’m talking about" spent twenty-six weeks in the CMC top twenty.

The band's second album, Wild Ride was recorded in Nashville in December 2003 and released in 2004.

== Discography ==
=== Albums ===
List of albums, with Australian chart positions
Title	Album details	Peak chart positions
Title	Album details	AUS
Livin Right (as Steve Forde & The Flange)	Released: 2002; Label: ABC Music; Formats: CD	-
Wild Ride (as Steve Forde & The Flange)	Released: July 2004; Label: ABC Music; Formats: CD	-
Rowdy (as Steve Forde & The Flange)	Released: January 2006; Label: ABC Music; Formats: CD	-
Steve Forde	Released: 16 September 2007; Label: ABC Music; Formats: CD	59
Guns & Guitars	Released: October 2008; Label: ABC Music; Formats: CD, Digital	56
Hurricane	Released: 13 August 2010; Label: FEG, ABC Music; Formats: CD, Digital	69
Greatest Hits	Released: 26 August 2011; Label: FEG, ABC Music; Formats: CD, Digital	-

== Awards and nominations ==
=== APRA Awards ===
The APRA Awards are presented annually from 1982 by the Australasian Performing Right Association (APRA), "honouring composers and songwriters". They commenced in 1982.

Year	Nominee / work	Award	Result	Ref.
2010	"I Ain't That Guy"	Country Work of the Year	Nominated	

=== Country Music Awards of Australia ===
The Country Music Awards of Australia (CMAA) (also known as the Golden Guitar Awards) is an annual awards night held in January during the Tamworth Country Music Festival, celebrating recording excellence in the Australian country music industry. They have been held annually since 1973.

Year	Nominee / work	Award	Result (wins only)
2008	"Spirit of the Bush" (with Lee Kernaghan & Adam Brand)	Vocal Collaboration of the Year	Won
2008	"Spirit of the Bush" (with Lee Kernaghan & Adam Brand)	Video Clip of the Year	Won
2008	"Spirit of the Bush" (with Lee Kernaghan & Adam Brand)	Single of the Year	Won
