= Dineen Group =

- Parent: Bill Dineen
- Founded: 1960s
- Headquarters: Warragul
- Service area: New South Wales; Victoria
- Service type: Bus & coach operator
- Depots: Corowa; Diamond Creek; Healesville; Heyfield; Lilydale; Warragul; Cooma; Kempsey; Morwell; Inverell
- Fleet: 703 (June 2021)
- Chief executive: Bill Dineen

The Dineen Group is an Australian owner of bus and coach companies in New South Wales and Victoria.

== History ==
In 1957 Bill Dineen started his business operating a route service between Trafalgar and Warragul living off the fare box revenue, Bill's first bus was a 1951 AB Bedford registration number VH 566, in 1960 Bill obtained his first school bus run from Yarragon to Trafalgar. In 1968 he purchased Workmen's Comfort Coaches of Trafalgar followed by Warragul Bus Lines. Heyfield Bus Lines was acquired circa 1984. In June 1985 Westernport Roadlines was purchased followed in October 1990 by Panorama Coaches from Don Nugent with 13 buses and coaches. In May 1991 Hurstbridge Coaches was purchased and later merged with Panorama Coaches. In 1995, Berwick Bus Lines was purchased.

In 2002, Sandringham & Brighton Coaches was acquired.

In September 2006, McKenzie's Tourist Services, Healesville was purchased and in November 2011 Martyrs Bus Service.

In November 2013 Cann's Bus Lines, Corowa was purchased.

In January 2017, Snowliner Coaches, Cooma was purchased from Evans Family.

In July 2017, Cavanagh Bus Group Kempsey was purchased from the Cavanagh's.

In February 2021, Latrobe Valley Buslines were purchased.

In June 2021, Symes Coaches of Inverell was purchased.

In September 2021, Inverell Bus Service was purchased.

In September 2021, Moons Buslines was purchased.

In June 2022, Experience Bus Hire & Charter was purchased. All associated trading names were removed from service.

In July 2023, Berrymans Bus Service in Fish Creek was acquired and became part of Westernport Roadlines.

== Fleet ==
As at February 2026, the Dineen Group operated 829 buses and coaches on Australian Bus Fleet Lists under the following brands: Victoria and New South Wales

- Berwick Bus Lines – 40
- Martyrs Bus Lines, Warburton – 44
- Panorama Coaches, Diamond Creek -151
- Westernport Road Lines, Koo Wee Rup – 98
- Sandringham & Brighton Coaches, Moorabbin – 17
- McKenzie's Tourist Services, Healesville – 61
- Heyfield Bus Lines – 37
- Warragul Bus Lines – 93
- Cann Corowa – 34
- Snowliner Coaches – 15
- Cavanagh's Bus & Coach – 14
- Latrobe Valley Bus lines – 106
- Symes Coaches – 46
- Unknown – 73
- Total – 756
