= Adam Brand (album) =

Studio album by Adam Brand
- Released: July 1998
- Genre: Country
- Length: 47:35
- Label: Festival Mushroom Records

Adam Brand chronology
Adam Brand (1998)	Good Friends (2000)

Adam Brand is the debut studio album by Australian recording artist Adam Brand. The album was released in July 1998 and peaked at number 44 on the ARIA charts. A special bonus tour edition was released in 1999. The album was certified gold in 1999 and was platinum in 2006.

The album was nominated for Best Country Album at the ARIA Music Awards of 1999

== Track listing ==
No.	Title	Writer(s)	Length
1.	"Uncle Pete"	Adam Brand	3:26
2.	"Never Live Without You"	Brand	3:57
3.	"Grandpa's Piano"	Vernon Rust	3:23
4.	"My Mind's Made Up"	Brand, John Kane	3:01
5.	"Come from the Heart"	Richard Leigh	3:58
6.	"Feelin' Single - Seein' Double"	Wayne Kemp	2:27
7.	"Losing Streak"	Brand, Colin Buchanan	2:34
8.	"Last Man Standing"	Brand	3:17
9.	"Size Two Boots"	Brand	3:49
10.	"Dirt Track Cowboys"	Brand	2:53
11.	"My Mama Told Me (Not to Play the Guitar)"	Don Walker	2:20
12.	"Here and There"	Brand, Graeme Connors	4:25
13.	"King of the Road"	Brand	3:27
14.	"Words Cannot Say"	Brand	4:38

Special Bonus Tour Edition
No.	Title	Length
1.	"Love Away the Night" (with Melinda Schneider)	3:38
2.	"Gospel Medley"	3:39
3.	"Uncle Pete" (live)	4:00
4.	"Charleville" (live)	3:24
5.	"Never Live Without You" (live)	4:00
6.	"Size Two Boots" (live)	4:02
7.	"T-Bird" (live)	3:40
8.	"T.R.O.U.B.L.E."	3:32

== Charts ==
Chart (1998/99)	Peak position
Australian Albums (ARIA)	44
Australian Country Albums (ARIA)	2

== Certifications ==
Region	Certification	Certified units/sales
Australia (ARIA)	Platinum	70,000^{^}
^{^} Shipments figures based on certification alone.

== Release history ==
Region	Date	Format	Edition(s)	Label	Catalogue
Australia	July 1998	CD; Cassette	Standard	Flying Nun Records, Festival Mushroom Records	
Australia	1999	CD; Cassette	Special Bonus Tour Edition	Compass Brothers, Festival Mushroom Records	
