= Adam Brand (singer) =

Australian country musician (born 1970)

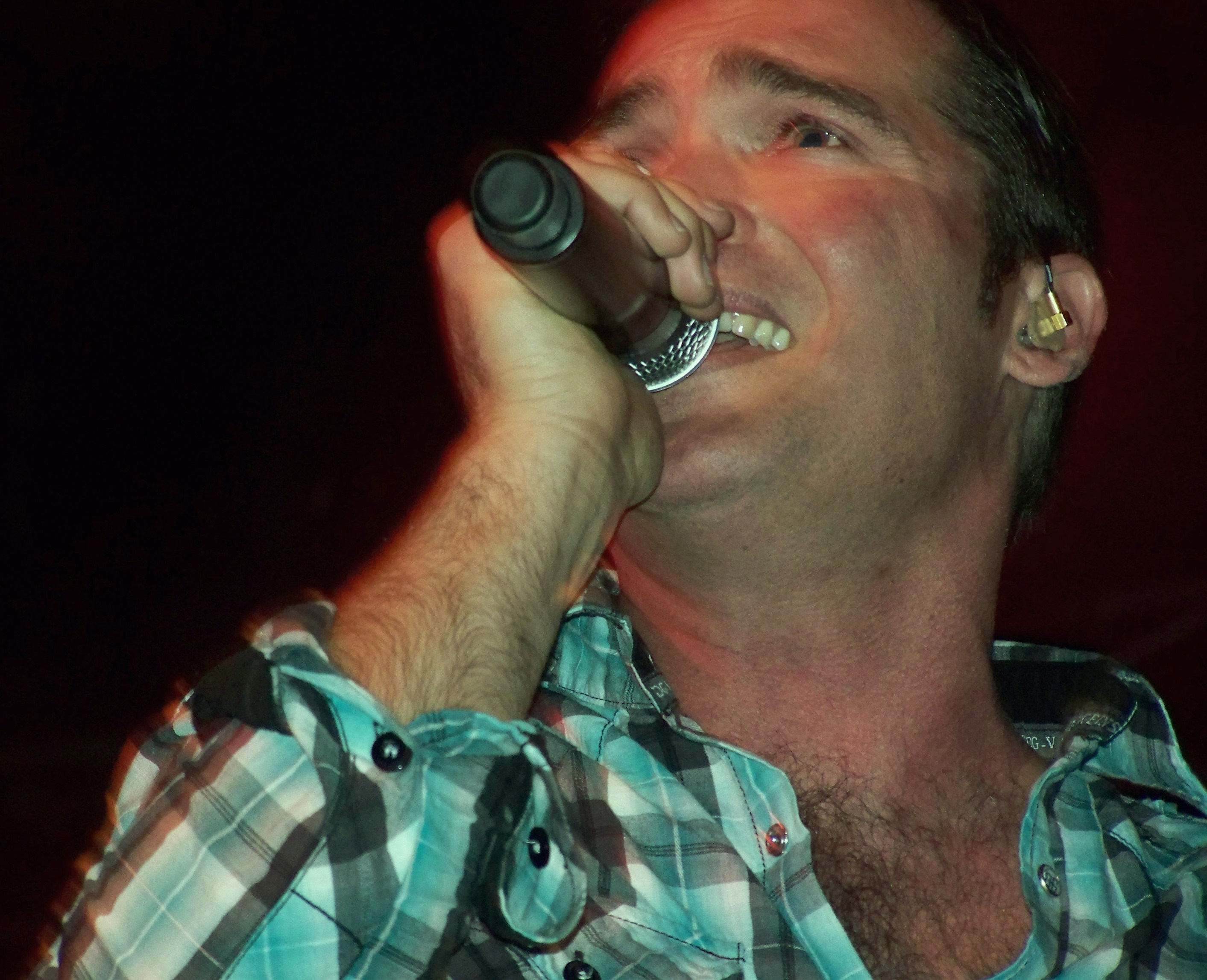

Background information
- Born: Adamo Alberto Brun; 27 January 1970 (age 56); Perth, Western Australia, Australia
- Genre: Country
- Occupations: Singer, songwriter
- Years active: 1997–present
- Labels: ABC Music; Flying Nun; Compass Brothers; Arista Nashville

Adam Brand (born 27 January 1970) is an Australian country music singer-songwriter. Brand released his debut album in 1997. He has since released 14 studio albums and has won 12 Country Music Awards of Australia. Adam Brand has been voted CMC Oz Artist of the Year five consecutive years between 2007 – 2011.

== Early life ==
Adam Brand was born on 27 January 1970 in Perth, Western Australia. Brand's first stage appearance was at age 3 singing "(How Much Is) That Doggie in the Window?" with his father Mick at a pub in Perth.

His love for music was heavily influenced by his father who was a singer and a fan of Elvis Presley. His mother exposed him to Kris Kristofferson, Roy Orbison and the Everly Brothers.

At age 10, Adam picked up the drum sticks. In his teens, Brand began playing the drums in church bands around Colac and Geelong where he was introduced to gospel and developed his lifelong love of rhythm.

== Career ==
=== 1997-1999: Career beginnings ===
In January 1997, Brand began busking on Peel Street, Tamworth which led to his first record deal with Festival Mushroom Records which he signed in September 1997. In July 1998, Brand released his debut self-titled studio album, which peaked at number 44 on the Australian ARIA album charts and was certified platinum. At the 1999 CMAA awards, Brand won three Golden Guitars; Song of the Year, New Talent of the Year and Video of the Year. The album was nominated for ARIA Award for Best Country Album at the 1999 ARIA Music Awards. Brand won the 'Johnny O'Keefe Encouragement Award' at the Mo Awards in July 1999.

=== 2000–2005: Career Establishment ===
In January 2000, Brand won his fourth CMAA Award for Vocal Collaboration of the Year with Melinda Schneider for "Love Away the Night". In March 2000, Brand released his second studio album Good Friends which peaked at number 26 on the ARIA charts. The album was nominated for Best Country Album at the 2000 ARIA Awards. In January 2001, Brand won three more CMAA Awards; Album of the Year, Male Vocalist of the Year and Song of the Year. He also won a Mo Award for Male Country Performer of the Year.

In January 2002, Brand released his third studio album Built for Speed which peaked at number 24 ARIA charts and was certified platinum in Australia. Brand won a further Mo Award for Male Country Performer of the Year. In January 2003, "The Anzac" won the CMAA Award for Heritage Song of the Year, Brand's eighth CMA Award overall. In 2003, Brand contributed the tracks "Sicilian Born" and "Menindee" to the compilation album Australian Storytellers. Both songs received CMA Awards nominations.

In August 2004, Brand released his fourth studio album Get Loud, which debuted at number 16 on the ARIA charts, was certified Gold and earned Brand's third ARIA Award nomination for Best Country Album. In October 2005 Brand released a Christmas album titled Christmas in Australia.

=== 2006–2009: Continued Success and Dancing with the Stars ===
In July 2006, Brand released his sixth studio album What a Life which peaked at number 28 on the ARIA charts and was certified Gold. Brand received another ARIA nomination for 'Best Country Album' at the ARIA Music Awards of 2006. In January 2007 Brand is awarded the inaugural Country Music Channel Oz Artist of the Year Award. In January 2008, Brand won three more CMA Awards for his song "Spirit of the Bush" with Lee Kernaghan and Steve Forde. In January 2008, Brand released his seventh studio album Blame It on Eve which became Brand's first ARIA top ten album. In September 2008, Brand's first compilation album Greatest Hits 1998–2008 was released. In January 2009 Brand wins his third consecutive CMC Oz Artist of the Year Award and his twelfth CMA Award when he won Male Artist of the Year. In March 2009 Brand released his eighth studio album Hell of a Ride, which peaked at number 19 on ARIA charts. In March 2009, Brand was the lead act at the Victorian Bushfire Appeal concert in Traralgon.

From July to September 2009, Brand competed the ninth season of Dancing with the Stars (Australia) and was declared the winner on 6 September 2009. Brand partnered professional dancer Jade Hatcher, whom he married on 31 May 2010.

In September 2009 Brand signed a recording contract with Arista Records, the Nashville-based division of Sony Music Entertainment for the distribution of his recordings in the United States.

=== 2010–present: Adam Brand label ===
In January 2010 Brand won his fourth consecutive CMC Oz Artist of the Year Award. In August 2010, Brand released his ninth studio album It's Gonna Be OK which peaked at number 11 on the ARIA charts. The Track "Ready for Loving" was released in the United States and reached the Top 40 in the US Country charts. In January 2011, Brand won CMC Oz Artist of the Year Award for the fifth consecutive year. In May 2011, Brand released a compilation album titled You're a Revhead before supporting Taylor Swift on her North American tour.

In August 2012, Brand released his tenth studio album There Will Be Love on Arista Nashville/Sony Music Australia, which peaked at number 4 on the ARIA charts; Brand's highest-charting album. This was followed by My Acoustic Diary which was the first album recorded by Brand's own label. It was distributed by ABC Music. The album saw Brand re-record 13 of his own tracks in an acoustic setting. Upon release, Brand said "I have decided to re-record some of these diary entries acoustically, the way they were first written… I've chosen songs that represent pivotal points in my life, and my growth as a songwriter and as an artist trying to find my own voice."

Brand's twelfth studio album My Side of the Street was released in August 2014, became his second top 5 album. It was nominated for an ARIA Award and two CMA Awards. In January 2015, Brand won CMC Oz Artist of the Year Award for a fifth year.

In January 2016, Brand released his thirteenth studio album Adam Brand and the Outlaws, featuring fellow Australian country musicians Travis Collins, Drew McAlister, Matt Cornell and Mike Carr. The album peaked at number 6 on the ARIA charts and was nominated for an ARIA Award. The album won a CMC Award for Highest Selling Album. In February 2017, Brand released Get On Your Feet which peaked at number 7 on the ARIA charts.

In July 2018, Brand celebrated 20 years since the release of his debut album releasing a compilation album titled Milestones... 20 Years. The album debuted at number 6 on the ARIA charts, becoming his highest charting compilation album. In September 2018 Brand joined Scott Darlow, Sarah McLeod, Jack Jones and Todd Hunter to re-record the Dragon song "Rain" with all net proceeds from the sale to go towards to the Buy-a-bale program in support of Australian farmers suffering from the Australian drought.

In late 2019, Brand appeared in the first season of The Masked Singer Australia as the 'Dragon' and was the sixth contestant voted out.

In August 2019 Brand released a new single "Life's Been Good to Me" after taking 12 months off to start a family with the birth of his first child, a baby girl named Pepper. Adam will be hitting the road with his Speed of Life Tour March 2020 when he will release his new album. Special guests on the tour will be new country duo "Cornell & Carr". Matt Cornell and Mike Carr were previously members of Adam Brand and the Outlaws.

== Personal life ==
Brand is a fan of motor sport. His song "Dirt Track Cowboys" is themed around speedway racing and features speedway commentator Wade Aunger. Brand has also raced, spending several years racing in the V8 Utes category racing Ford Falcon V8s in the early 2000s. Brand made a return to racing in 2011, competing in the 2011 Eastern Creek Six Hour. Brand and his co-drivers won their class racing a Suzuki Swift.

He has been married and divorced three times. At the age of 39 he met Jade Hatcher, then 19, on the set of Dancing with the Stars in 2009. They went on to win the competition despite a lower score compared to their competitor, Today Tonight presenter Matt White. Brand and Hatcher married in May 2010, but in late 2011 it was announced that they had separated. They later divorced.

In 2019, Brand became a father for the first time, after his partner gave birth to daughter Pepper.

Brand's partner gave birth to a second baby in August 2022.

== Discography ==
- Adam Brand (1998)
- Good Friends (2000)
- Built for Speed (2002)
- Get Loud (2004)
- Christmas in Australia (credited to Adam Brand and Friends) (2005)
- What a Life (2006)
- Blame It on Eve (2008)
- Hell of a Ride (2009)
- It's Gonna Be OK (2010)
- There Will Be Love (2012)
- My Acoustic Diary (2013)
- My Side of the Street (2014)
- Adam Brand and the Outlaws (as Adam Brand and the Outlaws) (2016)
- Get On Your Feet (2017)
- Speed of Life (2020)
- All or Nothing (2022)

== Awards and nominations ==
=== AIR Awards ===
The Australian Independent Record Awards (commonly known informally as AIR Awards) is an annual awards night to recognise, promote and celebrate the success of Australia's Independent Music sector.

Year	Nominee / work	Award	Result	Ref.
2009	Hell of a Ride	Best Independent Country Album	Won	
2023	All or Nothing	Best Independent Country Album or EP	Nominated	

=== APRA Awards ===
The APRA Awards are held in Australia and New Zealand by the Australasian Performing Right Association to recognise songwriting skills, sales and airplay performance by its members annually. Brand has been nominated nine times.

Year	Nominee / work	Award	Result
1999	"Last Man Standing"	Most Performed Country Work	Nominated
2000	"Dirt Track Cowboys"	Most Performed Country Work	Nominated
2001	"Beating Around the Bush"	Most Performed Country Work	Nominated
2002	"Good Things in Life"	Most Performed Country Work	Nominated
2003	"New England Highway"	Most Performed Country Work	Nominated
2008	"Spirit of the Bush" (Lee Kernaghan featuring Adam Brand and Steve Forde)	Country Work of the Year	Nominated
2009	"Coming From / Khe Sanh"	Country Work of the Year	Nominated
2010	"Hell of a Ride"	Country Work of the Year	Nominated
2015	"Freedom Rebels"	Country Work of the Year	Nominated

=== ARIA Music Awards ===
The ARIA Music Awards is an annual awards ceremony that recognises excellence, innovation, and achievement across all genres of Australian music. Brand has been nominated seven times.

Year	Nominee / work	Award	Result
1999	Adam Brand	Best Country Album	Nominated
2000	Good Friends	Best Country Album	Nominated
2004	Get Loud	Best Country Album	Nominated
2006	What a Life	Best Country Album	Nominated
2014	My Side of the Street	Best Country Album	Nominated
2016	Adam Brand and the Outlaws	Best Country Album	Nominated
2022	All Or Nothing	Best Country Album	Nominated

=== CMC Awards ===
The Country Music Channel (CMC Awards) are an annual fan voted award ceremony. From 2007 to 2010, The CMC awarded only one category, The Oz Artist of the Year, which Brand won four years in a row. The CMC Awards officially commenced in 2011, with four categories in total. Brand has won 11 awards in total.

Year	Nominee / work	Award	Result
2007	Adam Brand	Oz Artist of the Year	Won
2008	Adam Brand	Oz Artist of the Year	Won
2009	Adam Brand	Oz Artist of the Year	Won
2010	Adam Brand	Oz Artist of the Year	Won
2011	Adam Brand	Oz Artist of the Year	Won
2015	Adam Brand	Oz Artist of the Year	Won
2015	Adam Brand – "What Your Love Looks Like"	Video of the Year	Won
2016	Adam Brand	Oz Artist of the Year	Won
2017	Adam Brand and the Outlaws – Adam Brand and the Outlaws	ARIA Highest Selling Album	Won
2018	Adam Brand	Oz Artist of the Year	Won
2018	Adam Brand	Male Artist of the Year	Nominated
2018	Adam Brand – "Drunk"	Video of the Year	Won

=== CMA Awards ===
The Country Music Awards of Australia is an annual awards night held in January during the Tamworth Country Music Festival, celebrating recording excellence in the Australian country music industry. Brand has won 12 awards.

Year	Nominee / work	Award	Result
1999	Adam Brand – "Last Man Standing"	APRA Song of the Year	Won
1999	Adam Brand	New Talent of the Year	Won
1999	Adam Brand – "Last Man Standing"	Video Track of the Year	Won
2000	Adam Brand and Melinda Schneider – "Love Away the Night"	Vocal Collaboration of the Year	Won
2001	Adam Brand – Good Friends	Album of the Year	Won
2001	Adam Brand – Good Friends	Male Vocalist of the Year	Won
2001	Adam Brand – "Good Things in Life"	APRA Song of the Year	Won
2003	Adam Brand – "The Anzac"	Heritage Song of the Year	Won
2004	Adam Brand – "Sicilian Born"	Male Vocalist of the Year	Nominated
2004	Adam Brand – "Menindee"	Heritage of the Year	Nominated
2004	Adam Brand – "The Anzac"	Video Clip of the Year	Nominated
2004	Adam Brand – "The Anzac"	Single Of The Year	Nominated
2005	Adam Brand – "Get Loud"	Male Vocalist of the Year	Nominated
2005	Adam Brand – "Get Loud"	Video of the Year	Nominated
2005	Adam Brand – "Get Loud"	Song of the Year	Nominated
2005	Adam Brand – Get Loud	Album of the Year	Nominated
2005	Adam Brand – Get Loud	Top Selling Album of the Year	Nominated
2006	Adam Brand – Get Loud	Top Selling Album of the Year	Nominated
2007	Adam Brand – "Open Ended Heartache"	Male Vocalist of the Year	Nominated
2007	Adam Brand – What a Life	Album of the Year	Nominated
2007	Adam Brand – "Open Ended Heartache"	Single of the Year	Nominated
2007	Adam Brand – "Life Will Bring You Home"	Song of the Year	Nominated
2008	Adam Brand (with Lee Kernaghan and Steve Forde) – "Spirit of the Bush"	Vocal Collaboration of the Year	Won
2008	Adam Brand (with Lee Kernaghan and Steve Forde) – "Spirit of the Bush"	Video Clip of the Year	Won
2008	Adam Brand (with Lee Kernaghan and Steve Forde) – "Spirit of the Bush"	Single of the Year	Won
2008	Adam Brand (with Lee Kernaghan and Steve Forde) – "Spirit of the Bush"	Heritage Song of the Year	Nominated
2009	Adam Brand – "Get On Down the Road"	Male Artist of the Year	Won
2009	Adam Brand– "Comin' From"	Song of the Year	Nominated
2009	Adam Brand (with The Sunny Cowgirls) – "Someday"	Vocal Collaboration of the Year	Nominated
2015	Adam Brand – My Side of the Street	Top Selling Album of the Year	Nominated
2015	Adam Brand – My Side of the Street	Male Artist of the Year	Nominated
2018	Get On Your Feet	Contemporary Country Album of the Year	Nominated
2018	Adam Brand	Male Artist Album of the Year	Nominated
2021	Adam Brand – Speed of Life	Album of the Year	Nominated
2021	Adam Brand	Male Artist of the Year	Nominated
2023	"All Or Nothing"	Single of the Year	Nominated
2023	"All Or Nothing"	Song of the Year	Nominated
2023	All Or Nothing	Contemporary Country Album of the Year	Nominated
2023	All Or Nothing	Album of the Year	Nominated
2023	Adam Brand	Male Artist of the Year	Nominated
2024	"Our Church" (with Matt Cornell)	Vocal Collaboration of the Year	Pending

=== MO Awards ===
The Mo Awards is an annual award ceremony recognising achievements in live entertainment in Australia. Brand has won three awards.

Year	Nominee / work	Award	Result
1999	Adam Brand	Johnny O'Keefe Encouragement Award	Won
2001	Adam Brand	Male Country Performer of the Year	Won
2002	Adam Brand	Male Country Performer of the Year	Won

=== Queensland Music Awards ===
The Queensland Music Awards (previously known as the Q Song Awards) are an annual awards ceremony celebrating Queensland's brightest emerging artists and established legends. They commenced in 2006.

Year	Nominee / work	Award	Result	Ref.
2023	All Or Nothing	Highest Selling Album of the Year	Won	

=== Tamworth Songwriters Awards ===
The Tamworth Songwriters Association (TSA) is an annual songwriting contest for original country songs, awarded in January at the Tamworth Country Music Festival. They commenced in 1986. Adam Brand has won one award.

Year	Nominee / work	Award	Result (wins only)
1999	"Uncle Pete" by Adam Brand	New Songwriter Award	Won
