= Best of Gina Jeffreys... So Far =

Greatest hits album by Gina Jeffreys
- Released: 14 October 2002 (Australia)
- Recorded: 1993–2002
- Genre: Country
- Length: 71.37
- Label: ABC Music
- Producer: Garth Porter, Rod McCormack

Gina Jeffreys chronology
Angel (2001)	Best of Gina Jeffreys... So Far (2002)	Walks of Life (2006)

Best of Gina Jeffreys... So Far is the first greatest hits album by Australian country singer Gina Jeffreys. It was released in October 2002 and concluded her contract with ABC Music. The album received little promotion, as Jeffreys was 6 months pregnant at the time of release.

The album contains the most sought after tracks from her four award-winning albums, The Flame, Up Close, Somebody’s Daughter and Angel. The album also includes previously single-only, "Slipping Away" and three new tracks; including a cover of Radiohead’s "Creep" which she had performed on Andrew Denton's Musical Challenge and a cover of Linda Ronstadt's "Different Drum". Jeffreys explains; "We chose to record Different Drum because it has been a part of my life for so long. Both Rod and I grew up listening to Linda Rondstadt, whose version of the song is very well known, and we both love the song and what it says, but it’s also a song I used to sing in a covers band back in the days before I won Star Maker and went on to bigger things in country music. So it connects me back to those days — it’s a song from my past."

"Through the Eyes of a Child" is a new track co-written by McCormack, "Rod wrote the song for our unborn child — he wanted a special, positive song that would connect us with the baby. He called me from Nashville and sang it to me over the phone — and of course, being pregnant, it made me cry," Gina said.

== Track listing ==
Standard Edition (0602517786271)

1. "Angel" (Gina Jeffreys / Rick Price) – 4:07
2. "Dancin' With Elvis" (Ron Harbin / Stacy Worthington) – 3:36
3. "Fool Like That" (Gina Jeffreys / Fred Koller / Rod McCormack / Garth Porter) – 3:37
4. "Just Like the Moon" (Kim Richey / Tia Sillers) – 3:51
5. "Different Drum" (Michael Nesmith) – 3:10
6. "Through the Eyes of a Child" (Rod McCormack/ Jerry Salley) – 3:35
7. "Girls' Night Out" (Gina Jeffreys/ Rod McCormack/ Garth Porter) – 3:13
8. "That'll Be Me" (Gina Jeffreys/ Rod McCormack/ Jerry Salley) – 4:14
9. "Somebody’s Daughter" (Gina Jeffreys/ Rod McCormack/ Garth Porter) – 4:24
10. "I Haven't Got a Heart" (David Bates/ Gina Jeffreys/ Rod McCormack/ Garth Porter) – 4:31
11. "Break My Heart" (Brent Maher/ Jamie O’Hara) – 3:22
12. "Didn’t We Shine" (Jesse Winchester/ Don Schlitz) – 3:55
13. "Rocking Chair" (David Bates/ Gina Jeffreys/ Rod McCormack/ Garth Porter) – 4:06
14. "Standing Too Close to the Flame" (Jim Stewart/ Gloria Sklerov)– 3:49
15. "Josephine" (David Bates/ Gina Jeffreys/ Rod McCormack/ Garth Porter) – 3:55
16. "Two Stars Fell" (Jim Robertson) – 3:33
17. "Men" (feat. Tania Kernaghan) (Robert Byrne/ Alan Schulman) – 3:38
18. "Slippin’ Away" (Max Merritt)– (3:58)
19. "Creep" (live) (Radiohead, Albert Hammond, Mike Hazlewood) – (3:13)

== Charts ==
Chart (2002)	Peak position
Australian Albums (ARIA)	111
Australian Country Albums (ARIA)	8
