= Walks of Life =

Studio album by Gina Jeffreys
- Released: 13 January 2007(Australia)
- Genre: Country
- Length: 47:03
- Label: Ocean Road Music
- Producer: Rod McCormack

Gina Jeffreys chronology
Best of Gina Jeffreys... So Far (2002)	Walks of Life (2007)	Old Paint (2010)

Singles from Walks of Like
- 1. "Live It" Released: November 2006; 2. "Stepped Right in It" Released: February 2007

Walks of Life is the sixth studio album by Australian country singer Gina Jeffreys. It was her first studio album since her 2001 album Angel and first on the independent label Ocean Road Music.

The album was produced by husband and highly respected musician Rod McCormack and showcased a new vocal maturity of Jeffreys. The first single, "Live It", was released in November 2006 and the album was released at the 2007 Tamworth Country Music Festival.

Jeffreys co-wrote five of the songs on the album and said of this; "I try to write songs about real stuff in my life and if I'm lucky, people will connect with it. Musically, I love the traditional sounds of acoustic instruments like the banjo, mandolin, fiddle and guitar with lots of beautiful harmonies".

The title of the album gives name to a now annual "Walk of Life" at the Tamworth Country Music Festival. It commenced in 2007 with Jeffreys and other country music artists and fans walking around the streets of Tamworth creating an awareness and raise money for the Foundation. Money raised goes towards the Leukaemia Foundation.

Jeffreys toured nationally with the album.

== Review ==
Susan Jarvis of Country Music Capital News said; "It's been a long wait for Gina's new album, Walks Of Life, but well worth every minute. From the first song, Gina sets the tone for an inspiring, perceptive album that is both appealing and contains some important messages. Walks Of Life is about all the stages of life. Perhaps the highest accolade I can give an album is that it moved me so much it made me cry. This one did. Gina has created a stunning, very special album that shows why she's so highly regarded by Australia's country music community and her many fans."

== Track listing ==
Standard Edition (ORMGJA03)

1. "Live It" – 3:44
2. "The Truth About Lies" – 3:26
3. "Never Mind" (Feat. Felicity Urquhart) – 3:52
4. "Stepped Right In It" – 3:08
5. "Walks of Life" – 4:56
6. "A Woman Knows" – 3:20
7. "Song I Never Heard" – 3:34
8. "You Make My Heart Sing" (featuring Rod McCormack) – 1:50
9. "Heart Like a Wall" – 3:10
10. "Little Circle" – 4:40
11. "Evening Star" 3:55
12. "On a Good Day" 3:29
13. "Ivy and the Oak" 4:10

== Charts ==
Chart (2007)	Peak position
Australian Albums (ARIA)	136
Australian Country Albums (ARIA)	14

== Awards ==
The album was nominated for 'ARIA Award for Best Country Album' at the 2007 ceremony. It lost out to "Love, Pain & the whole crazy thing" by Keith Urban.

The album won the ‘Best Independent Country Album' at the Australian Independent Record Label Association Awards

The album was nominated for 'Album of the Year' at the 2008 Country Music Association of Australia Awards. It lost out to I'm Doin' Alright by Adam Harvey. Jeffreys also received a nominated for 'Female Vocalist of the Year' for the song "Truth About Lies", but lost out to "Then There's Me" by Dianna Corcoran and 'Video Clip of the Year' for "Stepped Right In It" by lost out to "Spirit Of The Bush" by Lee Kernaghan, Adam Brand & Steve Forde.
