= Calling Me Home =

Calling Me Home may refer to:

- Calling Me Home, a 2002 album by Alice Gerrard and its title song
- Calling Me Home (Kathy Mattea album), a 2012 album by Kathy Mattea and its title song
- Calling Me Home – The Best of Sara Storer (2010), the first compilation album by Australian country music singer Sara Storer
- "Calling Me Home to You" (1916), an American song written by Edward Teschemacher and composed by Francis Dorel
- They're Calling Me Home (2021), an album by Rhiannon Giddens with Francesco Turrisi
