= Christmas Wish (Gina Jeffreys album) =

Studio album by Gina Jeffreys
- Released: November 1999 (Australia)
- Recorded: 1999
- Genre: Country, Pop
- Label: ABC Music
- Producer: Rod McCormack

Gina Jeffreys chronology
Somebody's Daughter (1998)	Christmas Wish (1999)	Angel (2001)

"Christmas Wish" is the fourth studio and first Christmas album by Australian country singer Gina Jeffreys. The album contained four original tracks and nine Christmas classics. The lead single was "There's No Gift", which Jeffreys and McCormack co-wrote with American singer Jason Sellers. The album includes a duet with Australian jazz musician James Morrison and Australian a cappella vocal ensemble The Idea of North.

== Background, recording and promotion ==
"We recorded most of the album in July at our house, so our neighbours probably think that we're crazy," Jeffreys laughs. "But I just love Christmas time - the decorations, the music and everything that goes with it. Rod and I usually get the guitar out on Christmas Day and sing Christmas songs for our families [and] we thought it would be a good idea to record some of those songs."

Jeffreys promoted the album in Australia throughout November and December before she flew to East Timor to perform for Interfet troops. She was joined in Dili by Kylie Minogue, John Farnham, The Living End, Doc Neeson and James Blundell. "When I planned my Christmas shows, I never dreamed that my last show would be in Dili," Jeffreys says, "I'm delighted to be doing the concert and to be part of the team bringing the soldiers a little bit of Australia, and to let them know that they are in our thoughts."

Jeffreys continues to promote the album and performs songs from it frequently. In 2013, a video for "Have Yourself a Merry Little Christmas" was uploaded onto YouTube.

== Track listing ==
CD/ Cassette (7243 522107 25)

1. "Have Yourself a Merry Little Christmas" (Hugh Martin, Ralph Blane) - (4:11)
2. "Christmas Wish" (Rod McCormack/ Gina Jeffreys, Jerry Salley) - (3:26)
3. "Santa Claus Is Coming to Town" (Coots, Gillespie) - (2:15)
4. "There's No Gift" (with Jason Sellers) (Rod McCormack, Gina Jeffreys, Jason Sellers) - (4:04)
5. "All Wrapped Up in You" (Rod McCormack, Gina Jeffreys, Jerry Salley) - (2:59)
6. "Silver Bells" (Livingstone, Evans) - (3:19)
7. "Jingle Bell Rock" (Beal, Boothe) - (2:33)
8. "Heaven Kissed Earth" (Jerry Salley, Aaron Williams) - (3:52)
9. "Blue Christmas" (with James Morrison and The Idea of North (Jay Johnson, Billy Hayes) - (2:39)
10. "Away in a Manger" (Traditional) - (2:39)
11. "Silent Night" (Traditional) - (2:32)
12. "Here Comes Santa Claus" (Autry, Haldeman) - (1:46)
13. "Mary's Boy Child" (Hairston) - (4:51)

== Charts ==
Chart (1999)	Peak position
Australian Albums (ARIA)	77

== Personnel ==
Adapted from album liner.

- Producer - Rod McCormack
- Engineer - Jeff McCormack (at The Music Cellar)
- Strings and harp arranged by and conducted by - Larry Muhoberac
- Recorded at Tiger Studios
- Mastered at Studios 301

Musicians

- Rod McCormack - Guitars, Mandolin, Dobro, Banjo, Percussion, Backing Vocals
- Jeff McCormack - Bass
- Mitchell Farmer - Drums
- Larry Muhoberac - Piano & Keyboard
- Mick Albeck - Fiddle
- Michel Rose - Pedal Steel
- Christian Marsh - Chromatic Harmonica
- Stuart French - Electric Guitar
- Chrissy Moy - Backing Vocals
- James Gillard - Backing Vocals
