= Sara Storer =

Australian country singer (born 1973)

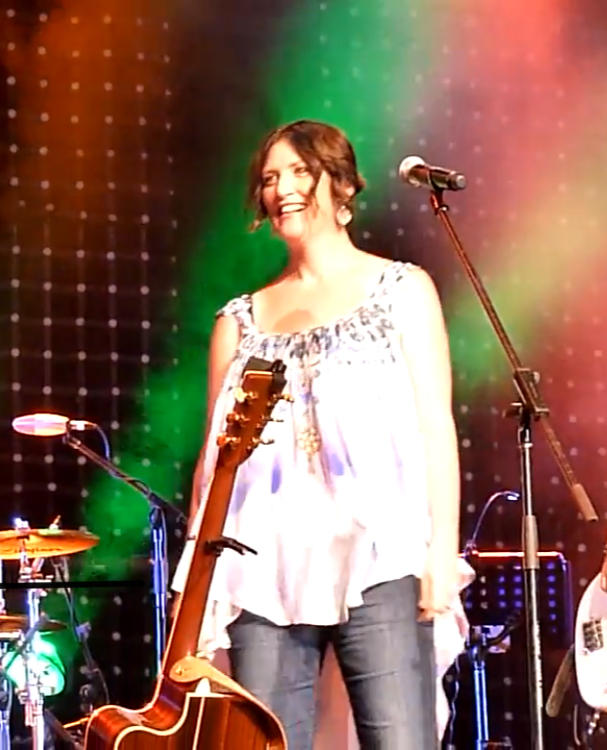

Background information
- Born: Sara Bettine Storer; 6 October 1973 (age 53); Wemen, Victoria
- Genre: Country
- Occupations: Singer-songwriter; Teacher
- Instruments: Vocals; Guitar
- Years active: 1996–present
- Labels: ABC; Universal; EMI
- Formerly of: Songbirds
- Spouse: David O'Hare (m. 2012)
- Website: sarastorer.com.au

Sara Bettine Storer (born 6 October 1973) is an Australian country music singer-songwriter and former teacher. She won a record breaking seven Golden Guitar awards in the Tamworth Country Music Festival in January 2004, and as of 2017, she has won 21 in total. Four of her seven studio albums have reached the top 30 on the ARIA Albums Chart, Firefly (July 2005), Lovegrass (August 2013), Silos (March 2016), and Raindance (January 2019). Silos also won Best Country Album at the ARIA Music Awards of 2016. Storer has been a member of a country music trio, Songbirds (2007–09) alongside Beccy Cole and Gina Jeffries. Her older brother, Greg Storer, is also a country music singer-songwriter and the siblings have recorded and performed together.

== Early career ==
Sara Bettine Storer was born in October 1973 in Wemen where her parents, Lindsay and Fay Storer, farmed wheat and cattle on a 5,000 acres (2,000 ha) property. Her three brothers, including Doug and Greg Storer, became farmers, she also has two older sisters. She attended school in nearby, Robinvale.

Storer later recalled, "I wasn't much of a farmer's daughter. Three brothers – they did everything and they enjoyed it. I would rather sit at home and help out with mum really. I was scared of cattle. I always got yelled at cos I was in the wrong spot you know, didn't really know what I was doing. I was never very good." She completed her tertiary studies in Melbourne, becoming a teacher and then headed north in the mid-1990s. Living in Camooweal, she met a retired water buffalo shooter, Harry Chandler, whose stories inspired her to write "Buffalo Bill", her first song.

Nine months later, Storer moved to Katherine, Northern Territory, where she taught kindergarten level at Casuarina Street Primary School. After a year there she taught at Kalkarindji (466 kilometres (290 mi) southwest of Katherine), for four years. Later she co-wrote and recorded a track, "Children of the Gurindji", with Kev Carmody, for her compilation album, Calling Me Home – The Best of Sara Storer (April 2010).

Carmody told Rhoda Roberts of Deadly Vibe, "[Storer] came up here about 12 months ago and we did a song about the Gurindji kids together. The whole basis of the song was, when she went to teach at Kalkarindji – she taught there for a number of years – she said that she came away with the kids teaching her more than she taught them, and that was the chorus of the song."

When not teaching she started playing at parties across the territory. She won a talent quest at Adelaide River which provided a scholarship to the College of Country Music, held two weeks before the Tamworth Country Music Festival, in January 2000. There she met Garth Porter, former keyboard player with Sherbet, and a record producer of fellow singers, Lee Kernaghan and Gina Jeffreys. Porter worked with Storer to record six tracks which he showcased to ABC Music's owners, who agreed to sign her to their label.

== Recording career ==
=== 2000–2009 ===
Sara Storer released her debut studio album, Chasing Buffalo, in August 2000 via ABC Music/Universal Music Australia with Porter producing. It peaked in the ARIA Albums Chart top 100, No. 20 on the Australasian Artists, No. 8 on the Hitseekers and No. 6 on the Country albums charts. She won the Best New Talent category at the 2001 Country Music Awards of Australia for her debut single, "Buffalo Bill", in January of that year.

Storer‘s second album, Beautiful Circle, was released in November 2002, which was produced by Porter again. In January 2004 at the Country Music Awards of Australia she was nominated for eight Golden Guitars, and won seven of them – a then-record number of trophies at one ceremony: Vocal Collaboration, Single of the Year and Song of the Year all for "Raining on the Plains" (with John Williamson); Female Vocalist of the Year and Album of the Year for Beautiful Circle, Songwriter of the Year for "Raining on the Plains" (co-written with Porter and Greg Storer); Bush Ballad of the Year for "Boss Drovers Pride" and Heritage Song of the Year for "Drover's Call".

The album reached No. 50 on the ARIA Albums Chart in March 2004. It also peaked at No. 11 on the Australasian Artists, No. 1 on the Hitseekers and No. 2 on the Country albums charts. She promoted it by touring with Australian country singer, Troy Cassar-Daley, and United Kingdom singer, Charlie Landsborough, including playing to an audience of over 40,000 people at the Gympie Muster, Queensland. On 6 October 2004 she issued her first DVD, Stories to Tell, which included music videos, interview footage, acoustic performances and new tracks.

Firefly, was Storer's third album, was released in July 2005, which peaked at No. 24 on the ARIA Albums Chart. Porter produced the work and it became her first number-one on the ARIA Country Albums Chart. She co-wrote and recorded duets on three tracks: with Greg ("Chiller's Bend"), Josh Cunningham ("Important Things") and Paul Kelly ("Must've Been a Hell of a Party").

Kelly described Storer, "You know she's paid attention, heard the bush waking up in the morning, listened to the worries thrashed out at the kitchen table, smelt dry summer wheat up close, dreamed of far away places in a bedroom with a window on a big sky, driven miles on dirt and bitumen and fallen in and out of love. She's found her own way to sing the stories that are all around her and then inside her bubbling out. She doesn't copy over-emotive, fake sincere twangy country singers from overseas. She's found her own restraint and steel and lets her songs do their sweet, sly work."

In December 2005 Deborah Conway established the Broad Festival project, "the idea that I would pull these different women performers together from different genres and call it Broad". Storer joined Conway, Katie Noonan, Ruby Hunter and Clare Bowditch where they performed their own and each other's songs on an Australian tour. Conway observed, "Sara you're a gorgeous surprise package, quiet and unassuming offstage; onstage, you had us pissing ourselves every night. I love that simple yet deceptive guitar playing and those haunting songs, which have such a piercing truth to them."

In March 2006 Storer played at the Queens' Lunch during the Melbourne Commonwealth Games. In February and March 2007 she performed a double-headlining tour with fellow country musician, Felicity Urquhart. In November of that year she released her fourth studio album, Silver Skies, which reached the ARIA Albums Chart top 100 and No. 3 on the Country Albums Chart. It was co-produced by Cunningham and Matt Fell for her new label, EMI Records.

Its lead single, "Land Cries Out", was released in September 2007, which Andrew Tijs of Undercover News described, "an achingly beautiful rumination on the bitterness of being forced to leave the land you love – an all too common scenario during the recent drought. With this heartfelt subject matter, Storer has branched away from traditional country sounds... [she] uses electric guitar and drums to complement the lament." From late January to early February 2008 she supported a tour by American singer-songwriter, Suzanne Vega.

From 2007 to 2009 she joined Beccy Cole and Gina Jeffreys to form a country music trio, Songbirds. The group released a live DVD, You've Got a Friend: Live in Concert, on 1 May 2009, which was accredited by ARIA as a gold album by the end of that year. It was recorded at Tamworth in January 2009. It was shown at cinemas from 29 April of that year, Storer opined, "I'm really proud of the Songbirds: You've Got a Friend live filming but am worried how pregnant I will look shown on a big screen."

Storer had encouraged her brother Greg, a cropping farmer from "Strawin" 60 kilometres (37 mi) north-west of Warren, New South Wales, to write music, she has performed his work, including duets with him and she is recorded on his debut single, "When I Was a Boy" (December 2009). He recalled, "Sara started off telling me to write some lyrics and then every now and then she said I should get up and have a sing at one of her shows. It was absolutely terrifying to get up and sing in front of some great artists... [its] a bit addictive. The trick is to never put the guitar away – in between wrestling with the kids or doing something else, I can just pick up the guitar."

=== 2010–2020 ===
In April 2010, Storer released her first compilation album, Calling Me Home – The Best of Sara Storer, which reached No. 28 on the ARIA Albums Chart and No. 1 on the Country Albums Chart. She had recorded three new tracks, "Calling Me Home", "Children of the Gurundi" (with Kev Carmody) and "Tears". At the ARIA Music Awards of 2010 John Williamson was inducted into their Hall of Fame in October, where Storer performed his tune, "Mallee Boy", in his honour.

The singer-songwriter launched her fifth album, Lovegrass, at the Gympie Music Muster in August 2013. She explained her preparation, "I'm getting there early and we're all going to catch up prior to the Muster for a rehearsal, which is a must especially when I'm releasing a new album and playing the songs with the band for the first time, really. We need a little practice run otherwise we could end up a train smash." Lovegrass, which was produced by Matt Fell, peaked at No. 25 on the ARIA Albums Chart and No. 5 on the Country Albums Chart. In 2015 Storer recorded "Song for Grace", a duet with Lee Kernaghan for his album, Spirit of the Anzacs (March 2015).

In March 2016 Storer released her sixth studio album, Silos, also produced by Fell, which peaked at No. 30 on the ARIA Albums Chart and No. 3 on the Country Music Albums Chart. It earned the musician her sixth nomination for ARIA Award for Best Country Album and her first win in the category, at that year's ceremony. At the Country Music Awards of Australia in January 2017 she received her 21st Golden Guitar – the most by any female artist.

In April 2019, Storer released her 7th studio album, Raindance.

=== 2020–present ===
In January 2023, Sara was featured on the self-titled album by Storer, alongside her brother Greg and Greg's daughters Bonnie & Pip.

In June 2025, Storer released her eighth studio album Worth Your Love. The title track was released as its lead single and features Sara's niece Sammy Storer.

== Personal life ==
When Sara Storer was 18, her parents moved from Wemen, Victoria to a farming property near Warren, New South Wales. Storer had lived in Melbourne, moved to Camooweal, North Queensland and then to Katherine and Kalkarindji, Northern Territory in the mid-1990s. By June 2009 Storer was living in Darwin. There she married David O'Hare, a cattle buyer, in April 2012 and the couple have four children. Storer took a break from song writing while focussing on parenting. O'Hare left Austrex in February 2014 after being their cattle export manager in Darwin for ten years.

As of May 2017 the family has a farm near Bowna 33 kilometres (21 mi) from Albury, they also have a home in Albury. In January of that year she acknowledged her family when receiving her Golden Guitars at the Country Music Awards, "Dave has been a great support when I've gotten down about still doing this with four little boys. I have to thank my boys as well, for giving me a little moment every now and then to get a few lines down on paper."

== Discography ==
=== Studio albums ===
List of studio albums, with selected chart positions and certifications
Title	Details	Peak chart positions		Certifications (sales thresholds)
Title	Details	AUS	AUS Country	Certifications (sales thresholds)
Chasing Buffalo	Released: 31 August 2000; Label: ABC Music (10062, 1778945); Formats: CD	99	6	
Beautiful Circle	Released: 4 November 2002; Label: ABC Music/Universal (1778976); Formats: CD	50	2	ARIA: Gold
Firefly	Released: 25 July 2005; Label: ABC Music/Warner (14460); Formats: CD	24	1	ARIA: Gold
Silver Skies	Released: 4 November 2007; Label: ABC Music/EMI Music (5132482); Formats: CD	60	3	
Lovegrass	Released: 23 August 2013; Label: ABC Music/Universal (3737063); Formats: CD, digital	25	5	
Silos	Released: 11 March 2016; Label: ABC Music/Universal (4778380); Formats: CD, digital	30	3	
Raindance	Released: 12 April 2019; Label: ABC Music/Universal (7737855); Formats: CD, digital	21	3	
Worth Your Love	Released: 27 June 2025; Label: Compass Brothers (125CBCD); Formats: CD, digital		1	
"—" denotes releases that did not chart or were not released in that country.

=== Collaborative albums ===
List of collaborative albums
Title	Details	Peak chart positions
Title	Details	AUS
Storer (by Storer)	Released: 13 January 2023; Label: Compass Brothers (108CBCD); Formats: CD, digital	56

=== Compilation albums ===
List of compilation albums, with selected chart positions and certifications
Title	Details	Peak chart positions	
Title	Details	AUS	AUS Country
Calling Me Home – The Best of Sara Storer	Released: 30 April 2010; Label: ABC Music/Universal (2734999); Formats: CD, digital	28	1

== Awards and nominations ==
=== AIR Awards ===
The Australian Independent Record Awards (commonly known informally as AIR Awards) is an annual awards night to recognise, promote and celebrate the success of Australia's Independent Music sector.

Year	Nominee / work	Award	Result
2014	Lovegrass	Best Independent Country Album	Nominated

=== ARIA Awards ===
The ARIA Music Awards is an annual awards ceremony that recognises excellence, innovation, and achievement across all genres of Australian music. Storer has won one award.

Year	Nominee / work	Award	Result
2001	Chasing Buffalo	Best Country Album	Nominated
2003	Beautiful Circle	Best Country Album	Nominated
2005	Firefly	Best Country Album	Nominated
2008	Silver Skies	Best Country Album	Nominated
2013	Lovegrass	Best Country Album	Nominated
2016	Silos	Best Country Album	Won
2019	Raindance	Best Country Album	Nominated

=== Country Music Awards (CMAA) ===
The Country Music Awards of Australia (CMAA) (also known as the Golden Guitar Awards) is an annual awards night held in January during the Tamworth Country Music Festival, celebrating recording excellence in the Australian country music industry. They have been held annually since 1973. Sara Storer has won 22 awards.

Year	Nominee / work	Award	Result
2001	"Buffalo Bill"	New Talent of the Year	Won
2004	Beautiful Circle	Album of the Year	Won
2004	Beautiful Circle	Female Vocalist of the Year	Won
2004	"Raining on the Plains" (duet with John Williamson)	Vocal Collaboration of the Year	Won
2004	"Raining on the Plains" (duet with John Williamson)	Single of the Year	Won
2004	"Raining on the Plains" (written by Doug Storer, Sara Storer, Garth Porter)	APRA Song of the Year	Won
2004	"Drover's Call"	Heritage Song of the Year	Won
2004	"Boss Drovers Pride"	Bush Ballad of the Year	Won
2006	Firefly	Female Vocalist of the Year	Won
2008	"Land Cries Out" (written by Sara Storer)	Heritage Song of the Year	Won
2008	"Land Cries Out" (written by Sara Storer)	APRA Song of the Year	Won
2010	"When I Was a Boy" (duet with Greg Storer)	Video of the Year	Won
2011	"Calling Me Home"	Video of the Year	Won
2012	"Children of the Gurindji" (duet with Kev Carmody)	Video of the Year	Won
2013	"Women in Song" (trio with Tamara Stewart and Felicity Urquhart)	Vocal Collaboration of the Year	Won
2014	Lovegrass	Album of the Year	Won
2014	Lovegrass	Female Vocalist of the Year	Won
2014	"Pozie" (duet with John Williamson)	Vocal Collaboration of the Year	Won
2015	"Canoe"	Video Clip of the Year	Won
2017	Silos	Female Artist of the Year	Won
2017	"Amazing Night"	Bush Ballad of the Year	Won
2024	"Dust Kids" (by SToReR) (written by Sara Storer, Greg Storer)	Bush Ballad of the Year	Won

== See also ==
- Songbirds
