= Faint of Heart =

Faint of Heart

- "Faint of Heart", song by Vince Gill from These Days (Vince Gill album)
- "Faint of Heart", song by Zion 1 and The Grouch from Heroes in the City of Dope 2006
- "Faint of Heart", song by Tegan and Sara from Love You to Death (album) 2013
- "The Faint of Heart", song by Gina Jeffreys from Somebody's Daughter (album)
