= Old Paint =

Studio album by Gina Jeffreys
- Released: 17 September 2010(Australia)
- Recorded: 2010
- Genre: Country
- Label: Ocean Road Music, Sony Music Australia
- Producer: Rod McCormack

Gina Jeffreys chronology
Walks of Life (2007)	Old Paint (2010)	Beautiful Tangle (2019)

Old Paint is the seventh studio album by Australian country singer Gina Jeffreys. It was released on the Independent label Ocean Road Music and distributed by Sony Music Australia in September 2010.

The album is a tribute to her early influences, aspirations and childhood memories. The album was recorded in one week. Her husband, Rod McCormack, produced and plays every instrument heard on the album.

Jeffreys said "Mum would always cry when I sang "Crazy" live" (and) ""Blue Bayou" was the first song I sang publicly at age 14 to audition for a band."

== Reception ==
Susan Jarvis of Country Music Capital News said; "..Just a few minutes in, I was completely captivated. Instead of simply re-hashing songs performed a million times before, Gina and Rod McCormack have breathed new life into these classic songs. With the focus is on a real, organic recording, all the warmth, familiarity and love present in Gina and Rod's home studio comes through. The performances on songs like "You Don’t Know Me", "Dream a Little Dream", "When You Wish Upon a Star" and "Smile" are simply exquisite, and you'll hear these songs as if for the first time. A highlight is her rendition of "Old Paint". Old Paint is an album to be treasured and savoured by country fans everywhere."

== Track listing ==
Standard Edition (ORMGJA04)

1. "It Doesn't Matter Anymore" (Paul Anka)
2. "Blue Bayou" (Roy Orbison, Joe Melson) - 4:11
3. "Dream a Little Dream of Me" (Fabian Andre, Wilbur Schwandt, Gus Kahn) - 3:29
4. "I'm So Lonesome I Could Cry" (Hank Williams) - 3:08
5. "Crazy" (Willie Nelson)- 4:51
6. "Here, There & Everywhere" (Lennon–McCartney) - 3:07
7. "You Don't Know Me" (Eddy Arnold, Cindy Walker) - 3:54
8. "He Thinks I Still Care" (Dickey Lee, Steve Duffy) - 3:22
9. "When You Wish Upon a Star" (Leigh Harline, Ned Washington) - 3:28
10. "Old Paint" (Traditional, Linda Ronstadt) - 2:36
11. "Smile" (Charlie Chaplin, John Turner, Geoffrey Parsons) - 4:08
