= Beautiful Circle =

Studio album by Sara Storer
- Released: November 2002
- Genre: Country
- Label: Universal Records
- Producer: Garth Porter

Sara Storer chronology
Chasing Buffalo (2000)	Beautiful Circle (2002)	Firefly (2005)

Beautiful Circle is the second studio album by Australian country music singer Sara Storer. It was released in November 2002.

At the ARIA Music Awards of 2003, the album was nominated for Best Country Album, losing to Golden Road by Keith Urban.

At the Country Music Awards of Australia in 2004, Storer received eight nominations and won seven awards, including Album of the Year and Female Vocalist of the Year.

== Making of the album ==
It was recorded in the second half of 2002 with Garth Porter at the controls. The first single "Raining on the Plains" was written by Storer's brother Doug Storer who lives near Gulargambone, New South Wales on a property facing the Warrumbungles. Sara Storer and Garth Porter also received songwriting credits for the track. It was sung as a duet with John Williamson.

In January 2004, she recorded a DVD called Stories to Tell on a family property near Dubbo where she tells the stories behind her songs. It was released as a bonus to the album in April 2004 and was also available separately.

== Promotion ==
"Raining on the Plains" reached number one on the country singles charts. Leading Australian radio presenter John Laws helped promote sales of the song by playing it repeatedly and she appeared on his Australia wide radio program. "These Hands" was also a successful single off the album.

Storer promoted the album with extensive touring with Australian country singer Troy Cassar-Daley and British singer Charlie Landsborough. One of the highlights in her touring was playing at the Gympie Muster in Gympie, Queensland where she played to an audience over 40,000.

== Critical success ==
The Age newspaper in Melbourne gave the album a five star rating describing her as "a rare commodity". The UK publication Country Music People also gave her a five star review saying "As we lament the death of Slim Dusty, here is evidence that authentic, yet contemporary Australian bush country has not died with his passing."

== Track listing ==
1. "Tell These Hands"
2. "Back Out Back"
3. "Drovers' Call"
4. "Beautiful Circle"
5. "Night after Night"
6. "Old Piece of Tin"
7. "Raining on the Plains" (Duet with John Williamson)
8. "Back on the Grader"
9. "Sweet Dreams"
10. "Kiss A Cowboy"
11. "Kurrajong Tree"
12. "Better Next Year"
13. "Boss Driver's Pride"
14. "Tell These Hands" (Reprise)
15. "I'll Be Home Soon" (Duet with Travis Sinclair)

== Charts ==
=== Weekly charts ===
Beautiful Circle peaked at No.50 on the ARIA Album chart in March 2004.

Chart (2002–04)	Peak position
Australian Albums (ARIA)	50
Australian Artist Albums (ARIA)	11
Australian Country Albums (ARIA)	2

=== Year-end charts ===
Chart (2004)	Position
ARIA Country Albums Chart	9

== Certifications ==
Region	Certification	Certified units/sales
Australia (ARIA)	Gold	35,000^{^}
^{^} Shipments figures based on certification alone.
