= Beautiful Tangle =

Studio album by Gina Jeffreys
- Released: 9 August 2019
- Label: Sonic Timber
- Producer: Rod McCormack

Gina Jeffreys chronology
Old Paint (2010)	Beautiful Tangle (2019)

Beautiful Tangle is the eighth studio album by Australian country singer Gina Jeffreys, released on 9 August 2019. The album is Jeffreys' first album of new music in 12 years after she took a break from releasing music to raise her children.

Prior to release, Jeffreys said "I've written every single song with some great writers - and every song is a page out of my life... We all sat in the same room and recorded everything live, it's pretty organic, kind of stripped back and naked" adding "I kind of feel as excited as I did when my first album came out over 25 years ago."

== Album content ==
Jeffreys said "There are songs that were hard to write without crying; songs about family, my love, my heart and my life.". "Milestones" is about losing a baby, "Gypsy Soul" is about feeling torn between wanting to be on the road and also wanting to stay at home, "Ferris Wheel Ride" is about mental health and "He Still Wants to Dance with Her" is a love song based on Jeffreys' parents.

== Reception ==
Madeline Link from Northern Daily Leader called the album "a new direction" for Jeffrey's saying "it's earthy, raw and acoustic, [and] carried by traditional bluegrass instruments and harmonies".

== Track listing ==
1. "Cash" – 3:55
2. "Do That" – 3:31
3. "Gypsy Soul" – 4:08
4. "He Still Wants to Dance with Her" (featuring Lee Kernaghan) – 3:46
5. "Vintage" – 3:30
6. "Unravel" – 2:47
7. "Chase the Girls Away" – 3:24
8. "Milestones" – 3:40
9. "Ferris Wheel Ride" – 3:01
10. "Exhale" – 3:32
11. "Time" – 4:16
12. "Room at the Table" – 4:37
13. "Rattles My Bones" – 3:11
14. "Gravity" – 3:35

== Charts ==
Chart (2019)	Peak position
Australian Digital Albums (ARIA)	35
Australian Country Albums (ARIA)	13
