= Somebody's Daughter =

Somebody's Daughter may refer to:

- Somebody's Daughter (film), a 1992 television film
- Somebody's Daughter (album), a 1998 album by Gina Jeffreys
- Somebody's Daughter (biography), a 2021 biography by Ashley C. Ford
- "Somebody's Daughter" (song), a 2018 song by Tenille Townes
