= Firefly (Sara Storer album) =

Studio album by Sara Storer
- Released: July 2005
- Genre: Country
- Label: ABC Music
- Producer: Garth Porter

Sara Storer chronology
Beautiful Circle (2002)	Firefly (2005)	Silver Skies (2007)

Firefly is the third studio album by Australian country music singer Sara Storer. It was released in July 2005 and peaked at number 24 on the ARIA Charts.

At the ARIA Music Awards of 2005, the album was nominated for Best Country Album, losing to Be Here by Keith Urban. At the Country Music Awards of Australia in 2006, Storer won the Female Vocalist of the Year award for the track "Firefly".

== Track listing ==
1. "The Ballad of Tommy Foster" – 3:09
2. "Crazy as it Seems" – 3:09
3. "Billabong" – 3:24
4. "Important Things" (with Josh Cunningham) – 3:24
5. "Firefly" – 3:41
6. "Since I've Gone" – 2:55
7. "Snow in Mid-July" – 3:09
8. "Star" – 3:15
9. "Molly Green" – 2:41
10. "Chillers Bend" – 3:31
11. "Dungarees" – 2:46
12. "Walk the Landings" – 3:39
13. "Must've Been a Hell of a Party" (with Paul Kelly) – 3:01
14. "Angel" – 3:56

== Charts ==
=== Weekly charts ===
Chart (2005)	Peak position
Australian Albums (ARIA)	24
Australian Artist Albums (ARIA)	4
Australian Country Albums (ARIA)	1

=== Year-end charts ===
Chart (2005)	Position
ARIA Country Albums Chart	11
Chart (2006)	Position
ARIA Country Albums Chart	37

== Certifications ==
Region	Certification	Certified units/sales
Australia (ARIA)	Gold	35,000^{^}
^{^} Shipments figures based on certification alone.
