= Songbirds (group) =

Australian country music girl group

- Origin: Australia
- Genres: Country music
- Instrument: Vocals
- Years active: 2007–2009, periodically
- Label: EMI Music
- Past members: Beccy Cole; Gina Jeffreys; Sara Storer

Songbirds (sometimes known as "Songbirds of Country") was an Australian country music girl group, formed in 2007 by platinum selling, ARIA Award nominated, and 24 time Golden Guitar winning artists and good friends Beccy Cole, Gina Jeffreys and Sara Storer. The group released a live DVD in 2009, which peaked at number 5 on the ARIA Top 40 Music DVD chart. The DVD was certified gold.

== History ==
The friendship of Cole and Jeffreys dates back to the 1990s they were bridesmaids for each other. Cole said (of Gina) "We’ll be friends forever; we know too much. Performing with one of your best friends is such a special feeling."

Cole, Jeffreys and Storer have appeared in each other's live shows and on recordings throughout the 1990s and 2000s. Songbirds is the brainchild of the girls themselves, where they can share the stage and sing some of their favourite songs.

Songbirds was announced in early 2007 initially as a four-show tour in NSW, however it sold out and additional dates added and the trio began touring nationally from July 2007. with a backing band of Albeck on fiddle; Duncan Toombs and James Gillard on acoustic guitars and backing vocals; Mal Lancaster on drums; and Ian Lees on bass guitar.

Brett Casben of Australian Stage Online compared the three lead vocalists: "Storer is possibly the most visibly disparate of the group bringing to her work a touching lyrical earthiness that reflects a ‘mallee’ heritage ... Cole is the power house of the production and her personal interpretation of the Storer work, 'Buffalo Bill' was a show stopper ... Jeffreys performs in a more reflective style". Susan Jarvis of Capital News noted that the "friendship between the three girls is very much in evidence" where each "performs some of their songs solo, but the three come and go in a wonderfully fluid and organic way, providing a feeling of warmth and spontaneity".

The trio toured to sell out crowds throughout 2007 and 2008. In January 2009, Songbirds recorded a live DVD of their performance. On 29 April 2009 the film premiered in Australian cinemas and was released commercially in May. The DVD peaked at number 5 on the ARIA Top 40 Music DVD chart in its third week charting and was certified gold. By the end of 2009, the trio had returned to their respective solo careers.

In October 2011, Songbirds were the feature act on a 7-day South Pacific Island cruise.

== Discography ==
=== DVD ===
Year	Title	AUS	Certification
2009	You've Got a Friend: Live in Concert	5	ARIA: Gold

=== Singles ===
- "You've Got a Friend" (May 2009)

== Legacy ==
In 2015 Australian female country singers Amber Lawrence, Aleyce Simmonds and Christie Lamb completed a combined tour called The Girls of Country Tour. The idea referring to the former sellout show of Songbirds.
