= Silver Skies =

Studio album by Sara Storer
- Released: November 2007
- Genre: Country
- Label: EMI Music Australia
- Producer: Josh Cunningham

Sara Storer chronology
Firefly (2005)	Silver Skies (2007)	Calling Me Home - The Best of Sara Storer (2010)

Silver Skies is the fourth studio album by Australian country music singer Sara Storer. It was released in November 2007 and peaked at number 60 on the ARIA Charts.

At the ARIA Music Awards of 2008, the album was nominated for Best Country Album, losing to Rattlin' Bones by Kasey Chambers and Shane Nicholson .

== Track listing ==
1. "Sitting Here with Fay" – 3:53
2. "Land Cries Out" – 3:54
3. "Cold River" – 3:21
4. "Silver Skies" – 4:32
5. "Long Live the Girls" – 3:42
6. "Second Time Around" – 2:46
7. "Lovely Valentine" – 4:12
8. "Crow" – 2:16
9. "Forgive" – 3:29
10. "Back in the Territory" – 2:38
11. "Twenty Three" – 3:30
12. "Tumbleweeds" – 4:52

== Charts ==
=== Weekly charts ===
Weekly chart performance for Silver Skies
Chart (2007)	Peak position
Australian Albums (ARIA)	60
Australian Country Albums (ARIA)	3

=== Year-end charts ===
Year-end chart performance for Silver Skies
Chart (2007)	Position
ARIA Country Albums Chart	26
