= Chasing Buffalo =

Studio album by Sara Storer
- Released: 2000
- Genre: Country
- Label: ABC Music
- Producer: Garth Porter

Sara Storer chronology
Chasing Buffalo (2000)	Beautiful Circle (2002)

Chasing Buffalo is the debut studio album by Australian country music singer Sara Storer. It was released in 2000 and produced three country number one singles. At the Country Music Awards of Australia in 2001, Storer won the Best New Talent award for the track "Buffalo Bill".

At the ARIA Music Awards of 2001, the album was nominated for Best Country Album, losing to Looking Forward Looking Back by Slim Dusty.

== Track listing ==
1. "Buffalo Bill" – 3:57
2. "Back with Me" – 3:22
3. "Man Trap" – 4:05
4. "Katherine" – 4:04
5. "Rollercoaster" – 3:38
6. "Done" – 4:12
7. "What's So Good" – 3:27
8. "I'm Giving In" – 4:28
9. "A Cowboy's Song" – 3:32
10. "Secretly" – 4:19
11. "Whistle as You Go" – 2:42
12. "Eerie Wind" – 3:27

== Charts ==
Chasing Buffalo peaked at No.99 on the ARIA Album chart in February 2002.

Chart performance for Chasing Buffalo
Chart (2000)	Peak position
Australian Albums (ARIA)	99
Australian Country Albums (ARIA)	6
