= Greg Storer =

- Genres: country

Greg Storer is an Australian country music singer and a cropping farmer who runs a property near Warren in Central Western New South Wales. He is the brother of country music singer Sara Storer, who encouraged him to write music and with whom he has performed duets, including his debut single "When I was a Boy" (2009) and on his first album Backwater (2010).

According to The Land newspaper, Greg wrote his first song in 2003, called Billabong, about the waterhole where the family swam and caught yabbies, and Sara Storer recorded the song on her third album. ABC Radio National described his debut album as "a collection of well-crafted down home stories of rural life" for which he "employed the cream of Australia's country musicians".

In January 2023, Greg will feature on the self-titled album by Storer, alongside his sister Sara and Greg's daughters Bonnie & Pip.

== Discography ==
=== Collaborative albums ===
List of collaborative albums
Title	Details	Peak chart positions
Title	Details	AUS
Storer (by SToReR)	Released: 13 January 2023; Label: Compass Brothers (108CBCD); Formats: CD, digital	56

== Awards ==
=== Country Music Awards of Australia ===
The Country Music Awards of Australia (CMAA) (also known as the Golden Guitar Awards) is an annual awards night held in January during the Tamworth Country Music Festival, celebrating recording excellence in the Australian country music industry. They have been held annually since 1973.

Year	Nominee / work	Award	Result
2010	"When I Was a Boy" by Greg & Sara Storer	Video Clip of the Year	Won
2024	"Dust Kids" by SToReR (written by Greg & Sara Storer)	Bush Ballad of the Year	Won

- Note: wins only
