= Slipping Away (Max Merritt & The Meteors song) =

Single by Max Merritt and The Meteors

from the album A Little Easier
- B-side: "I Keep Forgettin'"
- Released: September 1975
- Recorded: 1975
- Genre: Pop Rock; Soft Rock
- Length: 3:33
- Label: Arista Records
- Songwriter: Max Merritt
- Producer: Del Newman

Max Merritt and The Meteors singles chronology
"A Little Easier" (1975)	"Slipping Away" (1975)	"Let It Slide" (1976)

"Slipping Away" is a song written and performed by Max Merritt. It was released as a single in 1975 by his then United Kingdom-based New Zealand group, Max Merritt and the Meteors. As the second single from their album, A Little Easier (1975), it gave Merritt the biggest hit of his career in Australasia. It peaked at No. 2 in Australia and No. 5 in New Zealand. “That song struck a chord with a lot of people," Merritt said, "and I’m very proud of it. It has been very good to me."

In July 2008, Merritt was inducted by Glenn A. Baker into the ARIA Hall of Fame. He was joined on-stage by Kasey Chambers and her father, Bill Chambers to perform "Slipping Away".

== Track listing ==
1975
7" / 45 RPM single

Side A: "Slipping Away" (Max Merritt) - 5:28
Side B: " I Keep Forgettin' " (Leiber-Stoller) - 3:05

1977
7" / 45 RPM Single

Side A: "Slipping Away" (Merritt) - 3:33
Side B: "A Little Easier" (Merritt) – 3:53

== Charts ==
=== Weekly charts ===
Chart (1975–1976)	Position
Australia (Kent Music Report)	2
New Zealand	5

=== Year-end charts ===
Chart (1976)	Peak position
Australia (Kent Music Report)	15

== Certifications ==
Region	Certification	Certified units/sales
New Zealand (RMNZ)	Gold	15,000^{‡}
^{‡} Sales+streaming figures based on certification alone.

== Cover versions ==
- In 1992, Gina Jeffreys released a version as her debut single. It was later included on her 2002 greatest hits album Best of Gina Jeffreys... So Far.
- In 1999, Margaret Urlich recorded a version for her album, Second Nature.
- In 2008, Brian Fraser recorded a version for his 2008 album, Don’t Ask Me.
- In 2010, on an episode of the Australian TV series RocKwiz, Merritt sang a duet of the song with country singer Catherine Britt.
- In 2013, Glenn Meade released a version as a single.
- In December 2020, Marcia Hines, Didirri, Andy Bull, Mia Wray and Russell Morris performed "Slippin' Away" on The Sound as a tribute to Max Merritt, who had died in October of that year.
