= Angel (Gina Jeffreys album) =

Studio album by Gina Jeffreys
- Released: 5 April 2001(Australia)
- Studios: Sound Emporium (Nashville, Tennessee)
- Genres: Country, Pop
- Length: 39:30
- Label: ABC Music
- Producer: Garth Fundis

Gina Jeffreys chronology
Christmas Wish (1999)	Angel (2001)	Best of Gina Jeffreys... So Far (2002)

Angel is the fifth studio album by Australian country singer Gina Jeffreys. It was released in April 2002 and became her third album to chart on the ARIA top 50 after it debuted at No.42.

"Angel" was produced by Garth Fundis, who had worked with Alabama, Don Williams and Trisha Yearwood. He signed up for the project on the spot after hearing Gina's third album, ‘Somebody’s Daughter’. Whilst discussing the album, Jeffreys said; "I feel I've evolved since ‘Somebody's Daughter’, and now have a more diverse range of musical influences. But I also believe my fans are evolving and maturing with me, and I'm looking forward to performing the new songs for them."

The album was nominated for the 'ARIA Award for Best Country Album' at the 2001 ceremony. It lost out to "Looking Forward, Looking Back " by Slim Dusty.

The lead single and title track, "Angel" received significant airplay on music video shows including rage and Video Hits and peaked at No.57 on the ARIA singles chart.

At the APRA Awards of 2002, it won ‘Most Performed Country Work’. "Angel" won Jeffreys her fifth Golden guitar award at the Tamworth Country Music Awards of Australia in 2002 for ‘Video Clip of the Year’. The song was a finalist in the Australian Animation Awards of 2001.

== Track listing ==
Standard Edition

1. "Angel" (Gina Jeffreys, Rick Price) – (4:04)
2. "Just Like The Moon" (Kim Richey, Tia Sillers) – (3:48)
3. "Anywhere But Here" (Gordon Kennedy, Wayne Kirkpatrick) – (3:34)
4. "Out of The Blues" (Gina Jeffreys, Rick Price) – (3:46)
5. "I’m The One You’re Gonna Miss" (Lewis Anderson) – (4:21)
6. "When The Blues and My Baby Collide" (Paul Nelson, Bob DiPiero) – (3:17)
7. "Break My Heart" (Jamie O’Hara, Brent Maher) – (3:18)
8. "Waiting on The Real Thing" (Al Anderson, Mark Sanders) – (2:43)
9. "I Ain’t Gonna Fall For Love Again" ([Kim Richey, Vince Melamed) – (3:20)
10. "Broken Hearted" (Kim Richey, Mike Henderson) – (4:11)
11. "Quilt of Dreams" (Craig Bickhardt, Troy Haselden) – (3:04)

== Charts ==
"Angel" peaked at No.42 on the ARIA Album chart in its third week.

=== Weekly charts ===
Chart (2001)	Peak position
Australian Albums (ARIA)	42
Australian Artist Albums (ARIA)	10
Australian Country Albums (ARIA)	2

== Credits ==
Adapted from album liner.

- Produced by Garth Fundis
- Engineered by Dave Sinko
- Assisted by Matt Andrews
- Production Assistant Scott Paschall
- Recorded and Mixed at The Sound Emporium, Nashville, USA
- Additional Mixing at Loud Recordings, The Music Cellar.
- Photography by Karin Catt
- Greg Morrow – Drums
- Dave Pomeroy – Bass
- Steve Nathan – Keyboards, Piano, Hammond, Wurlitzer
- JT Corenflos – Electric Guitar
- Dan Dugmore – Electric, Acoustic and Steel Guitar, Lap Steel
- Kenny Vaughan – Electric Guitar
- Rod McCormack – Electric & Acoustic Guitar, Slide
- Jason Sellers – Harmony
- Sam Bacco - Percussion
- Rick Price, Camille Te Nahu, Bekka Bramlett, Russ Terrell, Vicki Hampton, Robert Bailey – Backing Vocals
