= Silos (Sara Storer album) =

Studio album by Sara Storer
- Released: 11 March 2016
- Genre: Country
- Label: ABC Music, Universal Music Australia

Sara Storer chronology
Lovegrass (2013)	Silos (2016)	Raindance (2019)

Silos is the sixth studio album by Australian country music singer Sara Storer. It was released in March 2016 and peaked at number 30 on the ARIA Charts.

At the ARIA Music Awards of 2016, the album won Best Country album.

== Critical reception ==
Christopher Bohlsen from the Renowned for Sound gave the album 3.5 stars out of 5 saying; "Sara Storer has a particular authenticity not too often seen in contemporary Australian country music. As many successful artists seem more Americanised, and more pop-influenced, Storer makes defiantly old-fashioned, deeply Australian music, rough edges and all. It's when she leans into these edges that her music is at its best." adding "The best track on the record is "The Ghost", with Storer shelving her wistfulness and replacing it with a menacing swagger. Surrounded by plucked banjos and sweeping strings, she sings "I’ll make you suffer like a real man should", and the sentiment lends her a much needed edge that isn't apparent until this track." Bohlsen also complemented the track "It Don't Mean Jack" calling it 'stunning' concluding, "Storer's ability to write a powerful song is inarguable, and whilst it's unfortunate that all of Silos can't be held up to its high standard, it still shows what a talented artist she is."

== Track listing ==
1. "My Diamond" – 3:58
2. "Purple Cockies" – 3:13
3. "Dandelions" – 3:18
4. "Colours Fade" – 3:33
5. "The Ghost" – 3:38
6. "Here I Go Again" – 2:48
7. "Amazing Night" – 4:15
8. "Ramshackle & Wood" – 2:47
9. "I Wonder Joe" – 3:26
10. "Mascara & Song" – 2:56
11. "The Ruining" – 3:06
12. "It Don't Mean Jack" – 4:38

== Charts ==
Chart (2016)	Peak position
Australian Albums (ARIA)	30
Australian Artist Albums (ARIA)	8
Australian Country Albums (ARIA)	3

== Release history ==
Region	Date	Format	Label	Catalogue
Australia	11 March 2016	CD; digital download	ABC Music, Universal Music Australia	4778380
