= Worth Your Love =

Studio album by Sara Storer
- Released: 27 June 2025
- Genre: Country
- Label: Compass Brothers

Sara Storer chronology
Raindance (2019)	Worth Your Love (2025)

Worth Your Love is the eighth studio album by Australian country music singer Sara Storer. It was announced on 27 May 2025 and scheduled for release on 27 June 2025.

The album will be supported by an Australian tour from July through November 2025.

The title track features Sara's niece Sammy.

At the 2026 Country Music Awards of Australia, the album was nominated for Album of the Year and Contemporary Country Album of the Year.

== Track listing ==
1. "Worth Your Love" (featuring Sammy Storer)
2. "175"
3. "Layers"
4. "Blind Freddy"
5. "Under Darwin Stars"
6. "Love Is a Battlefield"
7. "On a Limb"
8. "Sing Her Heart Out"
9. "Get In Before the Brolgas Do"
10. "Kids On a Rampage"
11. "Marmalade"
12. "Farmer"

== Charts ==
Chart (2025)	Peak position
Australian Artist Country Albums (ARIA)	1

== Release history ==
Region	Date	Format	Label	Catalogue
Australia	27 June 2024	CD; digital download	Compass Brothers	125CBCD
