= Lovegrass (album) =

Studio album by Sara Storer
- Released: 23 August 2013
- Genre: Country
- Length: 41:58
- Label: ABC Music, Universal Music Australia
- Producer: Matt Felltake

Sara Storer chronology
Calling Me Home - The Best of Sara Storer (2010)	Lovegrass (2013)	Silos (2016)

Lovegrass is the fifth studio album by Australian country music singer Sara Storer. It was released in August 2013 and peaked at number 25 on the ARIA Charts.

The title track is a song written about her husband Dave. "This is my love song for Dave. How lucky is he to have a song written for him about a noxious weed, every now and then I threaten him with Roundup!" Storer said. The album was launched at the 2013 Gympie Music Muster.

At the ARIA Music Awards of 2013, the album was nominated for Best Country Album, losing to Wreck & Ruin by Kasey Chambers and Shane Nicholson

At the Country Music Awards of Australia of 2014, Storer won Female Vocalist of the Year and Album of the Year.

== Critical reception ==
Scott Fitzsimons from The Music AU gave the album 3.5 out of 5 saying; "Storytelling is at the heart of any great country artist and Sara Storer is still a great storyteller. Lovegrass...comes after marriage and family life – experiences that are on this album's sleeve. She openly admits the title track is written for her husband and other cuts – "Come On Rain", "Heart & Sold", "You're My Everything" – can be attributed to that same family muse. Even when it's not about them, a romanticised Australian country life underpins everything here" adding "Storer doesn't need to prove anything on Lovegrass after the career she's had, and the break has given her a chance to choose the time and manner of her return. This feels right, it feels natural and it feels comfortable."

Katie Davern from Alt Media said "The stories are intimate and unique." adding "Lovegrass toes the line between folk and Storer's distinctively Australian brand of country; the former finds a home nestled in the title track whose feel-good melodies intertwine to tell Storer's own tale of a lover's rejoice. "

== Track listing ==
1. "Come on Rain" – 3:17
2. "Lovegrass" – 2:42
3. "Canoe" – 3:11
4. "Heart & Sold" – 3:32
5. "Shuffling Mess" – 2:59
6. "Pozie" – 5:36
7. "You're My Everything" – 3:11
8. "Next Year" – 4:01
9. "Sun Shower" – 3:08
10. "Chapters" – 4:32
11. "Willie Paroo" – 2:51
12. "Apple Seeds" – 2:58

== Weekly charts ==
Chart (2013)	Peak position
Australian Albums (ARIA)	25
Australian Artist Albums (ARIA)	9
Australian Country Albums (ARIA)	5

=== Year-end charts ===
Chart (2013)	Position
ARIA Country Albums Chart	37

== Release history ==
Region	Date	Format	Label	Catalogue
Australia	23 August 2013	CD; digital download	ABC Music, Universal Music Australia	3737063
