= Raindance (Sara Storer album) =

Studio album by Sara Storer
- Released: 12 April 2019
- Genre: Country
- Label: ABC Music, Universal Music Australia

Sara Storer chronology
Silos (2016)	Raindance (2019)	Worth Your Love (2025)

Raindance is the seventh studio album by Australian country music singer Sara Storer. It was released on 12 April 2019.

Speaking of the first single "Raindance", released in January 2019, Storer said: "'Raindance' is a song of hope. It also sends a message of coming together through dance and song. Music is great therapy and while our nation waits on rain let's dance and sing this drought away. As a songwriter, we can often find ourselves writing stories with a heavy heart whether it be about ourselves or of others. So with regard to the drought, and the endless hardships of Aussie farmers, I felt it time to write a song of hope. A song that can lift out spirits during the nations wait for rain."

The album will be supported by an Australian tour commencing on 2 March and concluding on 18 May.

At the ARIA Music Awards of 2019, the album was nominated for Best Country Album.

== Track listing ==
1. "Raindance" – 3:44
2. "My Little Men" – 4:13
3. "Plough'n It In" – 2:57
4. "Next Year People" (featuring Colin Hay) – 4:23
5. "Hayrunner" – 4:45
6. "Every Boy Needs a Bike" – 3:37
7. "How Sweet the Voice" – 3:49
8. "Natalie" – 3:45
9. "Fox" – 2:40
10. "The Captain" – 3:16
11. "Someday" – 3:21
12. "Jigalong Girls" – 3:50

== Charts ==
Chart (2019)	Peak position
Australian Albums (ARIA)	21

== Release history ==
Region	Date	Format	Label	Catalogue
Australia	12 April 2019	CD; digital download	ABC Music; Universal Music Australia	7737855
