= The Wheel (band) =

Australian country music band

- Genres: Country
- Members: Mick Albeck; Kim Cheshire; Mitch Farmer; Jeff McCormack; Rod McCormack

The Wheel is an Australian country music band. Their albums The Wheel and Good Noise were nominated for the 1996 and 1998 ARIA Awards for Best Country Album.

== Band members ==
- Mick Albeck
- Kim Cheshire
- Mitch Farmer
- Jeff McCormack
- Rod McCormack

== Discography ==
=== Albums ===
Title	Details
The Wheel	Released: 1995; Label: rooArt (74321438852); Format: CD
Good Noise	Released: 1997; Label: rooArt (74321507322); Format: CD

== Awards and nominations ==
=== ARIA Awards ===
The ARIA Music Awards is an annual awards ceremony that recognises excellence, innovation, and achievement across all genres of Australian music.

Year	Nominee / work	Award	Result
1996	The Wheel	Best Country Album	Nominated
1998	Good Noise	Best Country Album	Nominated

=== Country Music Awards of Australia ===
The Country Music Awards of Australia (CMAA) (also known as the Golden Guitar Awards) is an annual awards night held in January during the Tamworth Country Music Festival, celebrating recording excellence in the Australian country music industry. They have been held annually since 1973.

Year	Nominee / work	Award	Result
1996	The Wheel for "I Fell in Love"	Vocal Group or Duo of the Year	Won
1997	The Wheel for "Saw You Runnin'"	Vocal Group or Duo of the Year	Won

- Note: wins only
