= Gina Jeffreys =

Australian country singer-songwriter (born 1968)

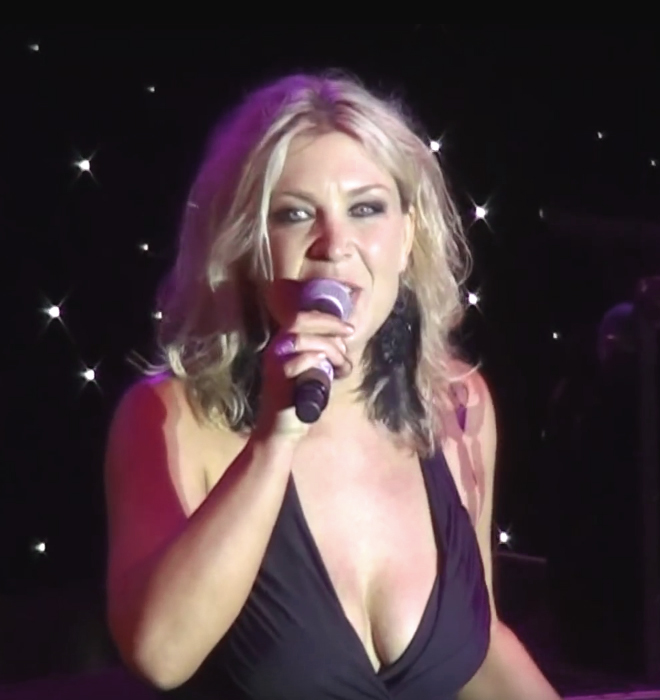
- Jeffreys at Broadway Melodies Theatre, Rhapsody Of The Seas, October 2013

Background information
- Born: Gina Hillenberg; 1 April 1968 (age 57); Toowoomba, Queensland, Australia
- Genres: Country
- Occupation: Singer-songwriter
- Instrument: Vocals
- Years active: 1991−present
- Labels: ABC Music, Ocean Road Music/MGM
- Website: ginajeffreys.com.au

Gina Jeffreys (born 1 April 1968), also known as Gina Jeffries, Gina Hillenberg and Gina McCormack, is an Australian country singer-songwriter and radio presenter.

== Career ==
In 1991, Jeffreys competed in the Toyota Star Maker Quest at the Tamworth Country Music Festival. After releasing her first single, "Slipping Away" (a cover of the 1975 song by Max Merritt), through BMG Music and "Radio Santa" in 1992, she signed a record deal with ABC Music and released "Two Stars Fell" in 1993. The song went straight to No. 1 on the Australian country charts.

"Two Stars Fell" won Jeffreys her first Golden Guitar award at the 1994 Tamworth Country Music Awards of Australia for Best Female Vocal Award. Later that year, she supported Johnny Cash and Kris Kristofferson on their Australian tours and positive reviews had her the subject of a Sixty Minutes story and an A Current Affair, segment. Her debut album, The Flame, was released in August 1994 and went platinum in 1997. Further hits followed, including "Girls' Night Out" which won Jeffreys her second Golden Guitar award for Best Female Vocal in 1995.

In July 1996, Jeffreys released her second album, Up Close. This was to be the album that broke the crossover barrier between country and mainstream. The album debuted straight into the national ARIA Charts at No. 9 while taking the No. 1 position of the national country charts. Up Close achieved Gold status during the same year as its release. Jeffreys toured nationally throughout 1996, appeared as a guest host of Sale of the Century and co-hosted the 1997 ARIA Music Awards. In 1997, she was inducted into the Tamworth Hands of Fame.

In June 1998, Jeffreys released her third album Somebody's Daughter, which peaked at No. 13 on the ARIA Charts. The album was certified Gold in 1999 and produced the hit song "Dancin' With Elvis" which won the Country Music Television's Video of the Year award in 1999. Jeffreys released a Christmas album in 1999, titled Christmas Wish.

In December 1999, Jeffrey's performed at the Tour of Duty – Concert for the Troops in Dili.

Throughout 2000, Jeffreys relocated to Nashville to record her next album, Angel, which was released in April 2001. The title track, "Angel", won numerous awards; including the 2002 Golden Guitar Award for Video Clip of the Year, the 2002 APRA Award for Most Performed Country Work and was named a finalist in the Australian Animation Awards in 2001. It charted at No. 57 on the ARIA singles chart.

In 2002, the Best of Gina Jeffreys... So Far was released. It includes her version of Radiohead's "Creep", which she had performed on Andrew Denton's Musical Challenge. This concluded her contract with ABC Music.

Jeffreys gave birth to her son Jackson in January 2003 and took some time out of the spotlight.

In 2006, Jeffreys signed a deal with Ocean Road Music and returned with the release of her album Walks of Life. In 2007, she was awarded Best Independent Country Release at the Australian Independent Record (AIR) Awards, for her album Walks of Life. At the Tamworth Country Music Festival of 2007, Jeffreys initiated a now annual "Walk of Life" where country music artists and fans walk around the streets of Tamworth to help create awareness and raise money for the Leukaemia Foundation. In April 2007, Jeffreys joined Beccy Cole and Sara Storer to form Songbirds; a successful multi-artist show in Australia that continued for some years. A live DVD was released of the Songbirds in 2009.

In 2009, Jeffreys performed a sell-out concert at Tamworth with Guy Sebastian and Wendy Matthews, followed by the release of Old Paint in 2010, a laid-back acoustic album of her all- time favourite songs.

In August 2019, Jeffreys released her eighth studio album, Beautiful Tangle. The first single, "Cash", was released in June 2019. It is her first new album in nine years.

From January 2022, Jeffreys replaced Sarah Forster as the co-host of the breakfast show on Star 104.5 on the New South Wales Central Coast, alongside Dave Rabbetts.

== Discography ==
=== Albums ===
Year	Album details	Peak chart positions		Certifications (sales thresholds)
Year	Album details	AUS	AUS Country	Certifications (sales thresholds)
1994	The Flame: Released: August 1994; Label: ABC Music	75	1	ARIA: Platinum
1996	Up Close: Released: July 1996; Label: ABC Music	9	N/A	ARIA: Gold
1998	Somebody's Daughter: Released: June 1998; Label: ABC Music	13	N/A	ARIA: Gold
1999	Christmas Wish: Released: October 1999; Label: ABC Music; Label: First Christmas album	77	1	
2001	Angel: Released: 5 April 2001; Label: ABC Music	42	2	
2002	Best of Gina Jeffreys... So Far: Released: 14 October 2002; Label: ABC Music; First greatest hits album	111	8	
2007	Walks of Life: Released: January 2007; Label: Ocean Road Music/MGM	136	14	
2010	Old Paint: Released: 17 September 2010; Label: Ocean Road Music/Sony Music Australia; First covers album	—	N/A	
2019	Beautiful Tangle: Released: 9 August 2019; Label: Sonic Timber	— (Note: Beautiful Tangle did not enter the ARIA Albums Chart, but peaked at number 35 on the ARIA Digital Albums Chart.)	13	
"—" denotes the album failed to chart or was not released.

=== Charting singles ===
List of charting singles (in top 200), with selected chart positions
Title	Year	Chart positions	Album
Title	Year	AUS	Album
"Radio Santa"	1992	190	Non-album single
"Two Stars Fell"	1994	142	The Flame
"I Haven't Got a Heart"	1997	106	Up Close
"Angel"	2001	57	Angel

=== See also ===
- Songbirds

== Awards and nominations ==
=== ARIA Awards ===
The ARIA Music Awards is an annual awards ceremony that recognises excellence, innovation, and achievement across all genres of Australian music. Jeffreys had been nominated for four ARIA Music Awards

Year	Nominee / work	Award	Result
1995	The Flame	Best Country Album	Nominated
1998	Somebody's Daughter	Best Country Album	Nominated
2001	Angel	Best Country Album	Nominated
2007	Walks Of Life	Best Country Album	Nominated

=== APRA Awards ===
The APRA Awards are held in Australia and New Zealand by the Australasian Performing Right Association to recognise songwriting skills, sales and airplay performance by its members annually. Jeffreys has won two awards.

Year	Nominee / work	Award	Result
1998	"I Haven't Got a Heart"	Most Performed Country Work	Won
2002	"Angel"	Most Performed Country Work	Won

=== Australian Independent Record Label Association Awards ===
Jeffreys has won one AIR Award

Year	Nominee / work	Award	Result
2007	Walks Of Life	Best Independent Country Release	Won

=== Country Music Awards (CMAA) ===
The Country Music Awards of Australia (CMAA) (also known as the Golden Guitar Awards) is an annual awards night held in January during the Tamworth Country Music Festival, celebrating recording excellence in the Australian country music industry. They have been held annually since 1973. Jeffreys has won five awards.

Year	Nominee / work	Award	Result (wins only)
1994	"Two Stars Fell"	Female Vocalist of the Year	Won
1995	"Girls Night Out"	Female Vocalist of the Year	Won
1996	"Didn't we Shine"	Female Vocalist of the Year	Won
1999	"Dancin' With Elvis"	Female Vocalist of the Year	Won
2002	"Angel" [Gina Jeffreys (directed by Dylan Perry)]	Video Clip of the Year	Won
2007	herself	Hands of Fame	imprinted

=== Mo Awards ===
The Mo Awards are annual Australian entertainment industry awards. They recognise achievements in live entertainment in Australia. Jeffreys has won four awards.

Year	Nominee / work	Award	Result
1993	herself	Female Country Entertainer of the Year	Won
1994	herself	Female Country Entertainer of the Year	Won
1996	herself	Female Country Entertainer of the Year	Won
1998	herself	Female Country Entertainer of the Year	Won
