= Angel (Gina Jeffreys song) =

Single by Gina Jeffreys

from the album Angel
- Released: 5 March 2001
- Studio: Sound Emporium (Nashville, Tennessee)
- Genre: Pop music, country
- Length: 3:49
- Label: ABC Music, EMI Music
- Songwriter(s): Gina Jeffreys; Rick Price
- Producer(s): Garth Fundis

"Angel" is a song by Australian singer songwriter, Gina Jeffreys and was released on 5 March 2001 as the lead single from her fifth studio album, Angel. It peaked at number 57 on the ARIA Singles Chart.

At the APRA Awards of 2002, "Angel" won ‘Most Performed Country Work’. and won Jeffreys her fifth Golden guitar award at the Tamworth Country Music Awards of Australia in 2002 for ‘Video Clip of the Year’. The song’s video was a finalist in the Australian Animation Awards of 2001.

== Track listing ==
CD Single
No.	Title	Length
1.	"Angel" (radio edit)	3:49
2.	"Quilt of Dreams"	3:07
3.	"Creep"	3:14
4.	"Angel" (album version)	4:07

== Charts ==
Chart (2001)	Peak position
Australia (ARIA)	57
Australian Artist (ARIA)	7

== Release history ==
Region	Date	Format(s)	Label	Catalogue
Australia	5 March 2001	CD single	ABC Music/ EMI Music	724388998925
