= Calling Me Home – The Best of Sara Storer =

Compilation album by Sara Storer
- Released: 30 April 2010
- Genre: Country
- Length: 71:58
- Label: ABC Music, Universal Music Australia

Sara Storer chronology
Silver Skies (2007)	Calling Me Home – The Best of Sara Storer (2010)	Lovegrass (2013)

Calling Me Home – The Best of Sara Storer is the first compilation album by Australian country music singer Sara Storer. It was released in April 2010 as a 1CD standard and 2CD 'collector's' edition. The album includes tracks from her four studio albums to date and peaked at number 28 on the ARIA Charts in its third week.

A DVD was released in November 2010, featuring 21 video clips from Storer's career.

== Reception ==
Susan Jarvis from Country Music Capital News said: "Over the last decade, Sara Storer has made an enormous contribution to Australian country music, with her fresh, original sound and her perceptive songs. This album provides a wonderful overview of her career, from her first single, "Buffalo Bill" through to several superb new songs, including "Calling Me Home", "Children of the Gurundi" and "Tears". In between, there are a stack of memorable songs. For those lucky enough to grab a Collector’s Edition of the album, there is a second disk that includes a swag of absolute gems: duets with the Sunny Cowgirls, Shane Howard, Paul Kelly, and Josh Cunningham, live versions of several songs, and another new track, the heartfelt "Darwin Love". This is an absolute treasure of an album, a must-buy for any Sara Storer fan, and anyone who’s about to become one".

== Track listing ==
Standard Edition

1. "Buffalo Bill"
2. "Back Out Back"
3. "Beautiful Circle"
4. "Back in the Territory"
5. "Calling Me Home"
6. "Sitting Here with Fay"
7. "Land Cries Out"
8. "What's So Good"
9. "Tears"
10. "Billabong"
11. "Raining on the Plains"
12. "Katherine"
13. "Children of the Gurindji"
14. "Crow"
15. "Drovers Call"
16. "Long Live the Girls"
17. "Angel"
18. "Tell These Hands"
19. "Man Trap"
20. "Lovely Valentine"

2CD Collector's Edition

1. "Mallee Girl"
2. "Darwin Love"
3. "Molly Green" (2010 Version)
4. "Important Things" (feat. Josh Cunningham) [2010 Version]
5. "Dungarees" (feat. The Sunny Cowgirls) [Live at TRECC]
6. "Star" (2010 Version)
7. "Christmas in the Country (Jimmy's Christmas)" [feat. Shane Howard]
8. "One Perfect Day"
9. "Boss Drovers Pride" (Live at TRECC)
10. "When I Was a Boy"
11. "Won't Give In"
12. "Must Have Been a Hell of a Party" (feat. Paul Kelly)
13. "Since I've Gone" (Live at TRECC)
14. "Chillers Bend" (feat. Greg Storer)
15. "Moonstruck"
16. "Night After Night"
17. "Sweet Dreams"
18. "Early Love"

== Charts ==
Chart (2010)	Peak position
Australian Albums (ARIA)	28
Australian Artist Albums (ARIA)	8
Australian Country Albums (ARIA)	1

=== Year-end charts ===
Chart (2010)	Position
ARIA Country Albums Chart	20

== Release history ==
Region	Date	Format	Label	Catalogue
Australia	30 April 2010	CD; digital download	ABC Music, Universal Music Australia	2734999
