= Up Close (Gina Jeffreys album) =

Studio album by Gina Jeffreys
- Released: July 1996 (Australia)
- Recorded: Sydney, Australia
- Genre: Country
- Length: 51.16
- Label: ABC Music
- Producer: Garth Porter

Gina Jeffreys chronology
| The Flame (1994) | Up Close (1996) | Somebody’s Daughter (1998) |

Up Close is the second studio album by Australian country singer Gina Jeffreys. It was released in July 1996 and became Jeffreys’ first top ten album after it debuted at No.9. It was certified Gold in Australia.

The album contained the song "Didn’t We Shine" which won Jeffreys her third consecutive 'Female Vocalist of the Year' award at the 1996 Tamworth Country Music Awards of Australia.

It also included the song "I Haven’t Got a Heart" which won Jeffreys her first APRA Award in 1998 for ‘Most Performed Country Work’.

== Promotion and tour ==
Jeffrey's promoted the album with performances on 'Today Today', 'Midday', 'Hey Hey It's Saturday' and 'A Current Affair', as well as on national ‘Carols by Candlelight' and 'Carols in the Domain’

Throughout 1996/97, Jeffreys toured Australia.

== Track listing ==
Standard Edition

1. "Girl Talk" (Gina Jeffreys, Garth Porter, Rod McCormack, Beccy Cole) (3:06)
2. "Under The Influence of Love" (Buck Owens, Harlan Howard) (3:21)
3. "The Bridge" (Tom Kimmel, Jack Pittmann) (3:41)
4. "Josephine" (Gina Jeffreys, Garth Porter, David Bates, Rod McCormack) (3:52)
5. "I Don’t Do Lonely" (K Williams, D Malloy, T Johnson) (3:12)
6. "Up Close Personal Attention" (L Raintree, J Raymond, J Stewart) (3:23)
7. "I Haven’t Got a Heart" (Gina Jeffreys, Garth Porter, David Bates, Rod McCormack) (4:29)
8. "The Weatherman" (Gina Jeffreys, Garth Porter, David Bates) (5:11)
9. "Hard Working Man" (Gina Jeffreys, Garth Porter, Rod McCormack) (3:22)
10. "Don’t" (Gina Jeffreys, Garth Porter, Rod McCormack) (3:34)
11. "Coming Back" (Gina Jeffreys, Garth Porter, Rod McCormack) (2:59)
12. "Since You Went Away" (Gina Jeffreys, David Bates, Rod McCormack, Fiona Kernaghan) (3:48)
13. "I Believe" Gina Jeffreys, Garth Porter) (2:50)
14. "Didn’t We Shine" (Jesse Winchester, Don Schlitz) (3:54) Bonus Track

== Charts ==
=== Weekly charts ===
| Chart (1996) | Peak position |
|---|---|
| Australian Albums (ARIA) | 9 |

=== Year-end charts ===
| Chart (1998) | Peak position |
|---|---|
| Australian Albums (ARIA) | 98 |

== Accredications ==
| Region | Certification | Certified units/sales |
|---|---|---|
| Australia (ARIA) | Gold | 35,000^{^} |
^{^} Shipments figures based on certification alone.

== Personnel ==
Adapted from album liner.

- Produced by Garth Porter
- Engineered by Ted Howard
- Additional Engineering by Jeff McCormack & David Hemming
- Mixed by Ted Howard, Garth Porter & Rod McCormack
- Recorded at Studios 301, Sydney
- Mastered by Steve Smart
- Assisted by Scott Rashleigh
- Photography by Jon Waddy
- John Watson – Drums
- Jeff McCormack – Bass
- Rod McCormack – Electric, Baritone & Acoustic Guitar, Lap Steel
- Mark Punch – Electric Guitar
- Rex Goh – Electric Guitar
- Larry Muhoberac – Piano, Keyboards, Organ
- Mick Albeck – Fiddle
- Garth Porter – Tambourine, B3 Hammond Organ, Percussion
- Steve Fearnley – Percussion
- Michel Rose – Pedal Steel
- Lawrie Minson – Harmonica
- Kym Warner - Mandolin
- Phillip Hartyl, Rebecca Daniel, Anne-Louise Comerford & Antony Morgan (a.k.a. String Quartet) - Strings
- James Gillard, Mark Punch, Rod McCormack, Gina Jeffreys, Chrissy Moy, Beccy Cole, Sandy Chic, Erana Clark – Backing Vocals
