= Andrew Denton's Musical Challenge =

2000 compilation album by various artists

Compilation album by Various artists
- Released: 2000
- Genres: Comedy, live
- Producer: Andrew Denton

Andrew Denton's Musical Challenge is an album released by Austereo in 2000 featuring musical challenges posed by radio comedian Andrew Denton to musicians, generally selecting a song in a style in contrast to their own. Following the success of the radio series, the album was released and then a second album followed in 2003, and later a compilation of the greatest of the two was released.

== Background ==
Andrew Denton hosted a morning radio program on Triple M Sydney, entitled Andrew Denton Breakfast Show. The Musical Challenge segment was created with Denton challenging musical guests to perform songs which don't necessarily suit their style, such as Jimmy Barnes singing ABBA's hit "Dancing Queen" Two CDs of these performances were released on Sony Music with proceeds from the sale going to the Children's Hospital at Westmead.

== Volume 1 ==
1. "Billie Jean" – Neil Finn (2:54)
2. "I Write the Songs" – Mark Lizotte (2:09)
3. "Word Up" – Taxiride (2:21)
4. "Dancing Queen" – Jimmy Barnes (4:07)
5. "Cheap Wine" – Tina Arena (3:34)
6. "Lump" – Lee Kernaghan (2:41)
7. "Wuthering Heights" James Reyne (2:22)
8. "Legs" – Human Nature (2:18)
9. "My Heart Will Go On" – The Screaming Jets (3:18)
10. "1999" – Shawn Mullins (3:51)
11. "Freak" – Troy Cassar-Daley (3:25)
12. "I Touch Myself" – Rolf Harris (2:11)
13. "Ben" – Jon Stevens (2:04)
14. "Creep" – Gina Jeffreys (3:14)
15. "You Got Nothing I Want" – Alex Lloyd (4:25)
16. "Gangsta's Paradise" – Richard Clapton (1:32)
17. "SOS" – Tonic (3:06)
18. "Jump in My Car" – Men at Work (1:46)
19. "Down Under" – The Red Army Choir (2:46)
20. "Pretty Fly (For a White Guy)" – James Blundell (3:10)
21. "It's a Long Way to the Top (If You Wanna Rock 'n' Roll)" – The Wiggles (1:35)
22. "Pretty Vacant" – The Delltones (3:13)
23. "Nutbush City Limits" – Suzanne Johnston (1:06)
24. "Why Don't You Get a Job?" – John Williamson (2:40)
25. "Thriller" – Joe Dolce (3:03)
26. "Play That Funky Music" – Archie Roach (1:21)

== Volume 2: Even More Challenged ==
1. "Sorrow" – Powderfinger (3:07)
2. "I Was Made for Lovin' You" – Killing Heidi (2:44)
3. "Mysterious Ways" – Alex Lloyd (2:52)
4. "When Doves Cry" – Barenaked Ladies (2:31)
5. "Kryptonite" – Gina Jeffreys (3:34)
6. "You Can't Stop the Music" – The Superjesus (3:21)
7. "Genie in a Bottle" – Something for Kate (3:24)
8. "Little Red Corvette" – Paul Kelly (3:20)
9. "Weir" – David Campbell (3:31)
10. "Baby I'm-a Want You" – The Living End (2:19)
11. "T.N.T." – Human Nature (1:23)
12. "Smells Like Teen Spirit" – Scandal'us (1:20)
13. "Jive Talkin'" – Spiderbait (2:12)
14. "Sexual Healing" – Neil Finn (3:00)
15. "Teenage Dirtbag" – Adam Brand (2:54)
16. "Wouldn't It Be Nice" – Lash (1:59)
17. "Top of the World" – Stabbing Westward (3:04)
18. "Sometimes When We Touch" – Diesel (2:56)
19. "I'll Never Fall in Love Again" – Bodyjar (1:52)
20. "Una Paloma Blanca" – Zed (2:45)
21. "Loving You" – The Cruel Sea (3:53)
22. "Eye of the Tiger" – Josh Joplin (3:01)
23. "Walk on the Wild Side" – The Wiggles (1:45)
24. "Are You Gonna Go My Way" – John Paul Young (2:20)
25. "Smoke on the Water" – Mental As Anything (2:38)
26. "Morning Train (9 to 5)" – The Angels (2:30)
27. "Dirty Deeds" – Kerri-Anne Kennerley (2:35)
28. "I'm Like a Bird" – Richard Clapton (2:19)
29. "Smells Like Teen Spirit" – Willie Nelson (1:20)

== Volume 3: Third Time Lucky! ==
=== The New Stuff ===
1. "Sympathy for the Devil" – Killing Heidi
2. "Love Will Keep Us Together" – Nickelback
3. "Aussie Medley" – Tenacious D
4. "Kiss Kiss" – Bodyjar
5. "These Days" – Kasey Chambers
6. "It's Raining Men" – Jebediah
7. "Murder On The Dancefloor" – One Dollar Short
8. "Wake Me Up Before You Go-Go" – Shawn Mullins
9. "Not Pretty Enough" – Grinspoon
10. "A Little Less Conversation" – Crash Palace
11. "The Girl from Ipanema" – Noiseworks
12. "Sex Bomb" – The Red Army Choir
13. "Enter Sandman" – Mental As Anything
14. "Paranoid" – Diesel
15. "Working Class Man" – David Campbell
16. "Sweet Child o' Mine" – Human Nature
17. "Close to You" – Hall & Oates
18. "Leaving on a Jet Plane/Jet Airliner" – The Screaming Jets
19. "Delilah" – James Reyne
20. "Alive" – Bob Downe
21. "Physical" – The Cruel Sea
22. "Control" – Adam Brand
23. "Advance Australian Working Class Man" – Adam Hills

=== The Classics ===
1. "Billie Jean" – Neil Finn
2. "Dancing Queen" – Jimmy Barnes
3. "Cheap Wine" – Tina Arena
4. "Lump" – Lee Kernaghan
5. "Ben" – Jon Stevens
6. "Creep" – Gina Jeffreys
7. "You Got Nothing I Want" – Alex Lloyd
8. "Smells Like Teen Spirit" – Scandal'us
9. "It's a Long Way to the Top (If You Wanna Rock 'n' Roll)" – The Wiggles
10. "Nutbush City Limits" – Suzanne Johnston
11. "Why Don't You Get a Job?" – John Williamson
12. "Sorrow" – Powderfinger
13. "You Can't Stop the Music" – The Superjesus
14. "Genie in a Bottle" – Something for Kate
15. "Little Red Corvette" – Paul Kelly
16. "Baby I'm-a Want You" – The Living End
17. "Jive Talkin'" – Spiderbait
18. "Are You Gonna Go My Way" – John Paul Young
19. "I'm Like a Bird" – Richard Clapton
20. "Smells Like Teen Spirit" – Willie Nelson

=== Bonus track ===
1. "Come as You Are" – Killing Heidi
