= The Flame (Gina Jeffreys album) =

Studio album by Gina Jeffreys
- Released: August 1994 (Australia)
- Recorded: Sydney, Australia
- Genre: Country
- Length: 51.02
- Label: ABC Music
- Producer: Garth Porter

Gina Jeffreys chronology
The Flame (1994)	Up Close (1996)

The Flame is the debut studio album by Australian country singer Gina Jeffreys. It was released in 1994 and it was the first album by an Australian female country singer to be certified gold. It was later certified platinum in 1997.

The album was nominated for Best Country Album at the ARIA Music Awards of 1995.

Jeffreys dedicated the album to her parents.

== Background ==
After releasing her first single "Slipping Away" through BMG Music, Jeffreys signed a record deal with ABC Music, and released her first single for the label "Two Stars Fell" in 1993. The song went straight to No.1 on the country charts. The song won the 'Female Vocalist of the Year' award at the 1994 Tamworth Country Music Awards of Australia. Jeffrey recorded a full album and it was released in 1994 and won the 'Female Vocalist of the Year' again in 1995 with the song "Girls’ Night Out".

== Track listing ==
Standard Edition (PLU: 991264)

1. "Girls’ Night Out" (Gina Jeffreys, Garth Porter, Rod McCormack) (3:12)
2. "My Shoes Keep Walking Back To You" (featuring Lee Kernaghan) (Bob Wills) (2:59)
3. "Standing Too Close To The Flame" (Jim Stewart, Gloria Sklerov) (3:48)
4. "Last Night I Dreamed Of Loving You" (Hugh Moffatt) (3:19)
5. "Rocking Chair" (Gina Jeffreys, Garth Porter, David Bates, Rod McCormack) (4:03)
6. "I Don’t Want To Be Alone Tonight" (Gina Jeffreys, Garth Porter, David Bates, Rod McCormack) (4:03)
7. "Getting Used To Getting Over You" (Gina Jeffreys, Garth Porter, Rod McCormack) (3:10)
8. "I Do My Crying At Night" (Lefty Frizzell, Sanger D. Shafer, A.L. Owens) (2:21)
9. "Affairs Of The Heart" (Kirk Lorange) (3:33)
10. "She Knows" (Gina Jeffreys, Garth Porter, David Bates) (3:54)
11. "Men" (feat. Tania Kernaghan)(Robert Byrne, Alan Schulman) (3:36)
12. "Wildflower" (Gina Jeffreys, David Bates) (2:52)
13. "I Don’t Want Tonight To Be Over" Gina Jeffreys, Garth Porter, Rod McCormack) (3:39)
14. "Distant Star" (Gina Jeffreys, David Bates) (2:58)
15. "Two Stars Fell" (Jim Robertson) (3:33) Bonus Track

1995 Re-release 2CD Bonus Tracks

1. "Didn’t We Shine" (J. Winchester, D. Schlitz) (3:52)
2. "Nothing But a Child" (Steve Earle) (3:51)
3. "Mercedez Benz" (Michael McClure) (3:27)
4. "You're No Good" (Clint Ballard, Jr. ) (2:26)
5. "If This is Love" (Steele, Farren) (3:27)
6. "The One I Love" (M. McClellan) (1:07)
7. "I’m Getting Over You" (B. Cadd) (3:17)

== Charts ==
Chart (1994–97)	Peak position
Australian Albums (ARIA)	77

== Certifications ==
Region	Certification	Certified units/sales
Australia (ARIA)	Platinum	70,000^{^}
^{^} Shipments figures based on certification alone.

== Awards ==
The album was nominated for Best Country Album at the ARIA Music Awards of 1995 but lost to ‘’Beyond the Dancing’’ by Troy Cassar-Daley.

== Personnel ==
Adapted from album liner.

- Produced by Garth Porter
- Recorded and Mixed by Ted Howard
- Bandtracks recorded at Paradise Studio, Sydney
- Overdubbing at Glebe Studios, Sydney
- Mixed at Studios 301, Sydney
- Assisted by Lachlan Mitchell
- Mastered at Studio 301 by Steve Smart
- Photography by Jon Waddy
- Mark Myers – Drums
- James Gillard - Bass
- Ian Lees – Bass
- Victor Rounds – Bass
- Rod McCormack – Electric, Nylon String & Acoustic Guitar,
- Mandolin, Dobro & Percussion
- Colin Watson – Acoustic Guitar, Acoustic Rhythm
- Tom Ferris – Acoustic & Electric Guitar
- David Bates – Acoustic Guitar
- Mark Punch – Electric Guitar
- Kirk Lorange – Electric Guitar
- Mick Albeck – Fiddle
- Larry Muhoberac – Piano
- Michel Rose – Pedal Steel
- Garth Porter – Tambourine, B3 Hammond Organ
- Dave Fennell – Keyboards
- Tony Ansell - Keyboards
- TC Cassidy, Carol Young, Mark Punch, James Gillard, Gina Jeffreys – Harmony
