= Charlie Landsborough =

British musician

- Born: Charles Alexander Landsborough; 26 October 1941 (age 84); Wrexham, Denbighshire, Wales
- Origin: Birkenhead, Merseyside, England
- Genres: Folk, country
- Occupations: Musician, songwriter
- Instrument: Guitar
- Years active: 1994–present

Charles Alexander Landsborough (born 26 October 1941) is a British country and folk musician and singer-songwriter. He started singing professionally in the 1970s, although his major success did not come until 1994 with his song "What Colour is the Wind". He is one of the UK's top country acts and is also popular in Ireland, Australia and New Zealand.

== Life ==
Born in Wrexham, Denbighshire, Wales, Landsborough was the youngest of 11 children. Soon after he was born, his mother (Aggie) moved the family back to Birkenhead after the World War II bombing raids. He was reared by the docklands of Birkenhead near the dumps, railway lines, coal wharf and oil factories.

He left school early and worked intermittently as an apprentice telephone engineer, on the railways, and in the flour mills before joining the army. He left after four years, in the early 1960s, and joined a group, The Chicago Sect, in Dortmund, Germany. Returning to England, he married, played in local bands, and worked in a variety of jobs before becoming a teacher at Portland Primary School on Laird Street, Birkenhead.

While working as a teacher, he wrote songs and continued to perform on a semi-professional basis, with limited success. However, in 1994 his song "What Colour is the Wind", which tells the story of a young blind child's attempts to envision the world, began to be played in Ireland after a TV appearance on RTÉ's Kenny Live show. The song was used as the title track of one of Landsborough's albums.

Following the album's success in Ireland, Landsborough appeared on several TV shows in the UK. Since then, he has released ten additional albums, including originals, greatest hits and double CDs of previous releases. Overall, sales of his albums have exceeded 700,000 units. He also has had two number ones singles in the Irish pop chart, and several of his albums have topped the British country charts. In 1996, he converted to Catholicism.

One of his most successful releases, Still Can't Say Goodbye was recorded in Nashville in 1999 and resulted in Landsborough winning the BMCA Best Male Vocalist (2000) for the third year in succession, and the Southern Country Award for best album. He has performed at most major concert halls and theatres in the UK, including the London Palladium. He also toured Australia and New Zealand in 2001.

His songs have been recorded by Foster and Allen ("I Will Love You All My Life"), Roly Daniels ("Part of Me"), and George Hamilton IV ("Heaven Knows").

There is a mural of him painted on the side of Merseyrail's Birkenhead North railway station.

== Discography ==
=== Albums ===
- Songs from the Heart (1992)
- What Colour Is the Wind (1994)
- With You in Mind (1996)
- Further Down the Road (1997)
- Still Can't Say Goodbye (1998)
- Once in a While (2001)
- Movin' On (2002)
- Smile (2003)
- Reflections
- The Lighter Side (Comedy Album)
- The Greatest Gift: An Album of Christmas Classics (2004)
- My Heart Would Know (2005)
- Heart and Soul (2006)
- Under Blue Skies (2008) – No. 73 (UK)
- Storyteller
- Nothing Lasts Forever (September 2009)
- Love, in a Song (2011)
- Destination
- Silhouette (2013)
- Here, There and Everywhere

=== Compilations ===
- The Very Best of Charlie Landsborough (1998)
- The Collection (2000)
- Classic Doubles (2002)
- A Portrait of Charlie Landsborough: The Ultimate Collection (2005) (2 CDs)
- The Very Best of Charlie Landsborough (2011) (2 CDs)
- Ultimate Storyteller (2014) (Box Set)
- Charlie Live: From Liverpool Philharmonic

=== Singles ===
Year	Song	Album
1982	"Thank You Lord"	Non-album singles
1983	"I Will Love You All My Life"	Non-album singles
1995	"What Colour Is the Wind"	What Colour Is the Wind
2000	"One True Love"	Still Can't Say Goodbye
2001	"Half the Ghost of a Chance"	Heart and Soul
2001	"Saviour's Song"	Heart and Soul
2001	"My Most Wonderful Time"	Heart and Soul
2002	"I'm a Lucky Man"	Heart and Soul
2002	"I Don't Know"	Heart and Soul
2002	"Who Is This Man"	Heart and Soul
2002	"It's About Loving You"	Heart and Soul
2002	"Song for the Dragonfly"	Heart and Soul
2004	"Twenty-Four Hours Times Two"	My Heart Would Know
2004	"My Heart Would Know"	My Heart Would Know
2004	"I Am Red"	My Heart Would Know
2004	"I Know What It Is to Be Loved"	My Heart Would Know
2004	"The Closest Thing to My Heart"	My Heart Would Know
2004	"Going My Own Sweet Way"	My Heart Would Know
2004	"Moate"	My Heart Would Know
2004	"He Still Holds You"	My Heart Would Know
2004	"Nothing Will Ever Be the Same Again"	My Heart Would Know
2004	"Like a Stone"	My Heart Would Know
2004	"I'll Be Missing You"	My Heart Would Know
2008	"Long Way Down"	Under Blue Skies
2008	"Some Mother's Son"	Under Blue Skies
2008	"Speed of the Sound of Loneliness"	Under Blue Skies

=== DVDs ===
- Charlie Landsborough – A Special Performance
- An Evening with Charlie Landsborough / Shine Your Light – Double DVD Collection

== Team ==
- Jamie Landsborough - Tour Manager
- Ken Davies - Manager
- Tony Ariss - Keyboards, Vocals
- Shane O'Borne Guitar, Vocals
- Phil Mcdonough - Guitar, Vocals
- Smithy - Merchandise

== Awards ==
Year	Awarding Body	Award
1990	British Country Music Awards	Single of the Year - How Do You Do Those Things
1990	BBC Radio 2 - Prestigious Award	Record of the Week - Heaven Knows
1992	British Country Music Awards	Top Solo Performer of the Year
1994	BBC East Midlands	North Country Music Song of the Year - What Colour is the Wind
1994	Country Music Round Up International Awards	Favourite Album - What Colour is the Wind
1994	Country Music Round Up International Awards	Most Popular Male Vocalist
1995	UK Country Awards	Best Album by a British Act (Recorded Anywhere) - What Colour is the Wind
1995	UK Country Awards	Best Single - What Colour is the Wind
1995	UK Country Awards	Best Song by a British Songwriter - What Colour is the Wind
1996	The Great British Country Music Awards	Best British Male Vocalist
1996	The Irish Record Music Association	International Country Album of the Year - With You in Mind
1996	UK Country Radio Awards	Best Single - Forever Friend
1996	UK Country Radio Awards	Best Song - Forever Friend
1996	UK Country Radio Awards	Most Nominations
1996	UK Country Radio Awards	Best Single - Further Down the Road
1996	Scottish Country Music Awards	Most Popular Male Artist
1996	Scottish Country Music Awards	Most Popular British Album - What Colour is the Wind
1996	Scottish Country Music Awards	Most Popular British Song - Forever Friend
1997	The Great British Country Music Awards	Best British Male Vocalist
1998	BBC Radio Merseyside Scouseology Award	Best Music - Top Personality
1998	The Great British Country Music Awards	Best British Male Vocalist
1998	UK Country Radio Awards	Best Single - Further Down the Road
1998	UK Country Radio Awards	Most Nominations
2000	The Great British Country Music Awards	Best British Male Vocalist
2000	The Great British Country Music Awards	Best British Album - Still Can't Say Goodbye
2000	UK Country Music Radio Awards	Best Album - Still Can't Say Goodbye
