= Somebody's Daughter (album) =

Studio album by Gina Jeffreys
- Released: 14 June 1998(Australia)
- Recorded: Nashville, United States
- Genre: Country
- Length: 46:02
- Label: ABC Music
- Producer: Garth Porter

Gina Jeffreys chronology
Up Close (1996)	Somebody's Daughter (1998)	Christmas Wish (1999)

Somebody's Daughter is the third studio album by Australian country singer Gina Jeffreys. It was released in June 1998 and became Jeffreys' second top twenty album after it debuted at No.13 It was certified Gold in Australia.

The album was nominated for Best Country Album at the 1998 ceremony. It lost out to "My Own Sweet Time " by Shanley Del.

The album contained the song "Dancin' With Elvis" which won Jeffreys her fourth 'Female Vocalist of the Year' award at the 1999 Tamworth Country Music Awards of Australia.

== Review ==
Rosie Adsett of Country Update said; "Somebody's Daughter is the musical reflection of the maturity of Gina Jeffreys. Part of that development is Gina's partnership with one of Australia's finest musicians, Rod McCormack. Together they have written more than half the songs on this album including the very moving "That'll Be Me". The first single from this album "Dancin' With Elvis" has captured the media's imagination with its catchy tune and clever lyric. Gina's duet with Billy Dean "Have We Forgotten What Love Is" is sure to be all over the airwaves after Billy's visit "down-under" to perform at the Gympie Muster. This is the first album Gina has recorded in Nashville and it has given her the opportunity to work with some of the all-time great country musicians. Eddy Bayers on Drums, Brent Mason on Guitar, Sam Bush on Mandolin, Dave Pomeroy on Bass, Mat Rollings on Piano, and that's just some of the Nashville crew. They are joined by Aussies Michel Rose on steel, Jeff McCormack on bass, and Rod McCormack on guitar. All those involved with this work have good reason to be proud. It sounds like it was a pleasure to make this CD but it's evident that there was an enormous amount of work and talent invested in it."

== Track listing ==
Standard Edition

1. "Fool Like That" (Gina Jeffreys/ Garth Porter/ Rod McCormack/ Fred Koller) – (3:33)
2. "Somebody's Daughter" (Gina Jeffreys/ Garth Porter/ Rod McCormack) – (4:21)
3. "You Fool" (Angela Kaset) – (3:01)
4. "Dancin' With Elvis" (Stacy Worthington/ Ron Harbin) – (3:23)
5. "Love Without a Doubt" (Rebecca Howard/ Kim Williams) – (3:41)
6. "Have We Forgotten What Love Is" (with Billy Dean) (Billy Dean/ Crystal Bernard) – (4:00)
7. "That'll Be Me" (Gina Jeffreys/ Rod McCormack/ Jerry Salley) – (4:13)
8. "The Faint of Heart" (Gina Jeffreys/ Rod McCormack/ Jerry Salley) – (3:33
9. "Saving Grace" (Jerry Salley/ C A Wilburn) – (4:31)
10. "All We Have is Love" (Gina Jeffreys/ Rod McCormack/ Jim Robinson) – (4:23)
11. "Trouble is a Woman" (David Malloy/ Tim Johnson/ Kim Williams) – (2:59)
12. "What Did I Do?" (Gina Jeffreys/ Rod McCormack) – (4:26)
- "That'll Be Me" is dedicated to Louisa, a seven-year-old girl who was a member of her fan club and wrote to Gina. Louisa had leukemia and died before Gina had a chance to meet her in person. She wrote "That'll Be Me" using the words from those letters.

== Charts ==
Chart (1998)	Peak position
Australian Albums (ARIA)	13

== Certifications ==
Region	Certification	Certified units/sales
Australia (ARIA)	Gold	35,000^{^}
^{^} Shipments figures based on certification alone.

== Personnel ==
Adapted from album liner.

- Produced by Garth Porter
- Mixed by Clarke Schleicher
- Mastered by Steve Smart at Studios 301, Sydney
- Assisted by Brad Cooke
- Album art work – Bernadette Carroll
- Photography by Jon Waddy
- Eddie Bayers – Drums
- Dave Pomeroy – Bass
- Matt Rollings – Piano, Hammond B3
- Rod McCormack – Acoustic & Electric Guitar, Mandolin
- Brent Rowan – Acoustic Guitar
- John Hughey – Pedal Steel
- Brent Mason – Electric Guitar
- Steuart Smith – Electric Guitar
- Sam Bush – Mandolin
- Stuart Duncan – Fiddle, Octave Fiddle
- Philip Hartl – Violin
- Rebecca Daviel – Violin
- Valmai Coggins - Viola
- Antony Morgan - Cello
- Michael Rose – Pedal Steel
- Tony Azzopardi – Percussion
- Jerry Salley – Dobro
- Jerry Douglas – Dobro
- Brendan Radford - Harmonica
- Mark Punch, Chrissy Moy, James Gillard, Rod McCormack, Jerry Salley, Brendan Radford – Backing Vocals
