= Rod McCormack =

Australian country music producer and guitarist

- Origin: Central Coast (New South Wales), Australia
- Occupations: Record producer; songwriter; musician
- Instruments: Guitar; keyboards
- Years active: 1979–present
- Formerly of: The Wheel
- Spouse: Gina Jeffreys (m. 2000)
- Website: www.rodmccormack.com

Rod McCormack (born 13 February 1963) is an Australian record producer, musician and songwriter.

== Biography ==
=== Career ===
McCormack is responsible for many high selling and award-winning albums and was named Country Music Awards of Australia Producer of the Year in 2004, 2008 and again in 2010. He has written over 30 number-one country hits and has produced albums for Gina Jeffreys, Paul Kelly, Troy Cassar-Daley, Adam Harvey, Beccy Cole amongst others.

He was part of the band The Wheel between 1995 and 1999. In 2000, McCormack married Australian country singer-songwriter Gina Jeffreys. In September 2019, McCormack released his first solo studio album, Fingerprints.

== Discography ==
Title	Details
Fine Lines (with Jeff McCormack)	Released: 1979; Label: Jam Records (JCWM 0029); Format: LP
Hand Picked The Banjo & The Fiddle (with Mick Albeck)	Released: 1979; Label: ABC Music (4797632); Format: CD
Fingerprints	Released: 20 September 2019; Label: Sonic Timber Records (ST006); Format: CD, Digital download, streaming

== Awards ==
=== CMAA Awards ===
These annual awards have been presented since 1973 and have been organised by Country Music Association of Australia (CMAA) from 1993, to "encourage, promote and recognise excellence in Australian country music recording". From that time the recipient's trophy has been a Golden Guitar.

Year	Nominee / work	Award	Result (wins only)
1995	"Little Rock Gettaway" (with Mick Albeck)	Instrumental of the Year	Won
1996	"Cut to the Chase" (with Mick Albeck)	Instrumental of the Year	Won
2002	Workin' Overtime by Adam Harvey (produced by Rod McCormack)	Album of the Year	Won
2008	I'm Doin' Alright by Adam Harvey (produced by Rod McCormack)	Album of the Year	Won
2010	I Love This Place by Troy Cassar-Daley (co-produced by Rod McCormack)	Album of the Year	Won
2012	Falling Into Place by Adam Harvey (produced by Rod McCormack)	Album of the Year	Won
2014	Black Coffee by Lachlan Bryan and The Wildes (co-produced by Rod McCormack)	Alternative Album of the Year	Won
2020	"Timeless Traveller"	Instrumental of the Year	Won

=== Tamworth Songwriters Awards ===
The Tamworth Songwriters Association (TSA) is an annual songwriting contest for original country songs, awarded in January at the Tamworth Country Music Festival. They commenced in 1986.

Year	Nominee / work	Award	Result (wins only)
2002	"Too Strong to Break" by Beccy Cole, Rod McCormack and Rick Price	Contemporary Song of the Year	Won
