= Massive Attack discography =

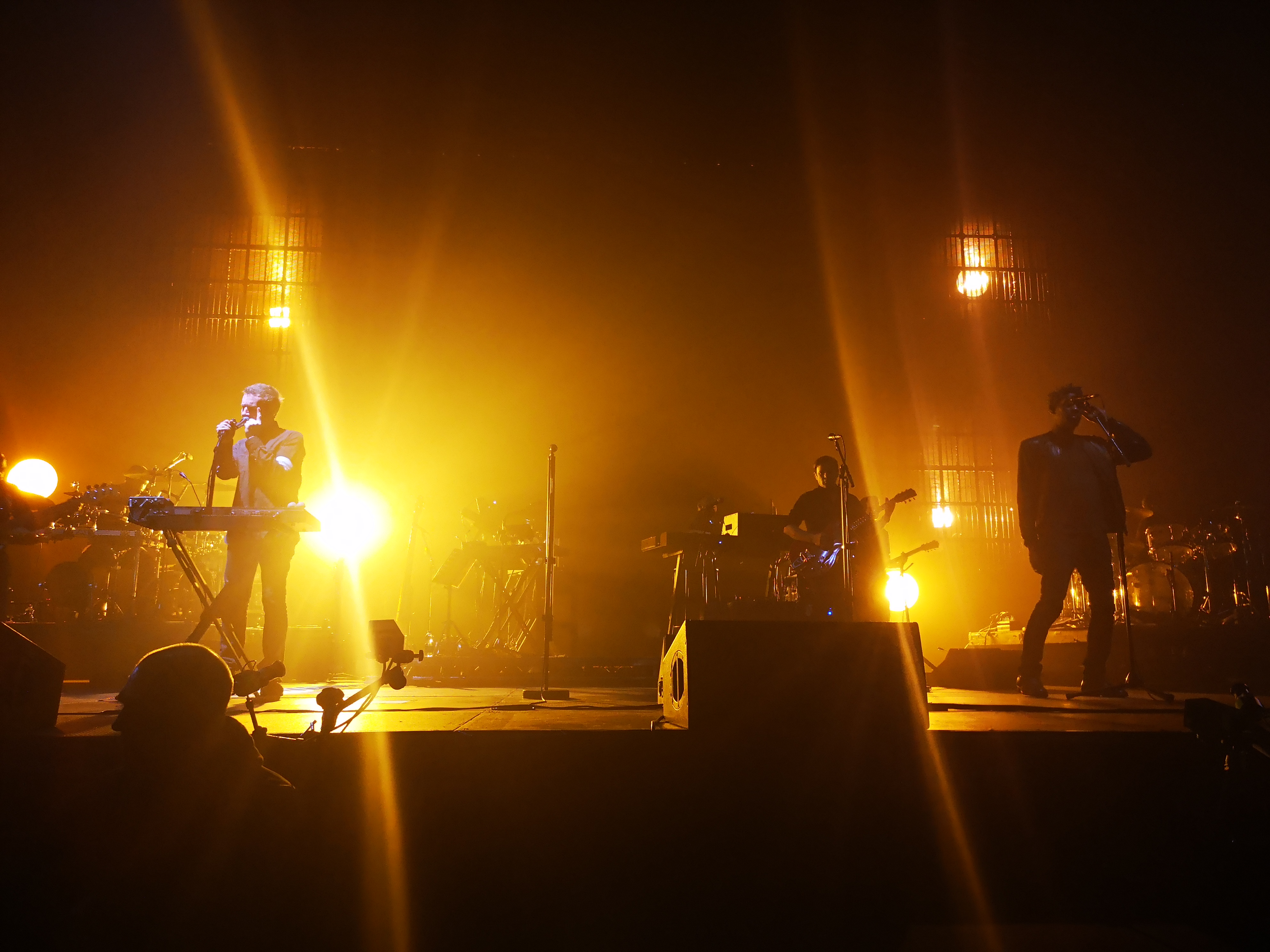
- Massive Attack live at Mediolanum Forum in Assago on 6 February 2019, during their Mezzanine XXI tour
- Studio albums: 5
- Extended plays: 6
- Soundtrack albums: 1
- Compilation albums: 3
- Singles: 18
- Music videos: 27
- Remix albums: 5

The discography of British trip hop band Massive Attack consists of five studio albums, three compilations, five remix albums, one soundtrack, five EPs, eighteen singles, and twenty-seven music videos. The group was founded in 1988 by musicians Robert "3D" Del Naja, Adrian "Tricky" Thaws, Grantley "Daddy G" Marshall, and Andrew "Mushroom" Vowles in Bristol, England. Prior to this, all four were members of British sound system the Wild Bunch.

Massive Attack's debut album, Blue Lines, was released in 1991 and was a pioneering force in the forming of the fusion genre dubbed trip hop. Blue Lines peaked at number 13 on the UK Albums Chart and was certified Double Platinum in the United Kingdom. The album spawned four singles, three of which charted in the top 100 of the UK Singles Chart. In 1994, Massive Attack released their second album, Protection, which peaked at number 4 in the UK. In 1998, the group issued their third album, Mezzanine, which peaked at number 1 in the UK and Australia and was the group's first release to chart in the United States. 100th Window was released in 2003, peaking at number 1 in the UK and three other countries.

In 2006, Massive Attack released Collected, a compilation of the group's singles and music videos. It charted in seven countries and was certified Platinum in the UK. Their fifth studio album, Heligoland, was released in 2010. It peaked at number 6 in the UK and was certified Gold.

== Albums ==
=== Studio albums ===
List of studio albums, with selected chart positions and certifications
Title	Album details	Peak chart positions										Sales	Certifications
Title	Album details	UK	AUS	AUT	BEL (Note: Ultratop maintains two concurrent charts for the two largest regions of Belgium, the Dutch-speaking region of Flanders and the French-speaking southern region of Wallonia. This note indicates chart positions for Flanders.)	FRA	GER	NLD	NZ	SWI	US	Sales	Certifications
Blue Lines	Released: 8 April 1991 (UK); Label: Wild Bunch/Virgin; Formats: CD, cassette, LP	13	69	5	81	31	31	39	26	26	—	UK: 856,108 (Note: Sales as of February 2021); US: 266,000 (Note: Sales as of February 2010)	BPI: 3× Platinum; SNEP: 2× Gold
Protection	Released: 26 September 1994 (UK); Label: Wild Bunch/Circa; Formats: CD, cassette, LP	4	15	21	47	24	63	76	9	29	— (Note: Protection did not enter the US Billboard 200 but peaked at number 19 on the US Heatseekers Albums Chart.)	UK: 653,864 (Note: Sales as of February 2021); US: 292,000 (Note: Sales as of February 2010)	BPI: 2× Platinum; IFPI SWI: Gold; NVPI: Gold; SNEP: Gold
Mezzanine	Released: 20 April 1998 (UK); Label: Circa/Virgin; Formats: CD, cassette, LP, digital download	1	1	3	4	3	6	17	1	6	60	UK: 769,392 (Note: Sales as of February 2021); US: 560,000 (Note: Sales as of February 2010)	BPI: 2× Platinum; ARIA: Platinum; BRMA: Platinum; BVMI: Gold; IFPI AUT: Gold; IFPI SWI: Platinum; MC: Gold; NVPI: Gold; SNEP: 2× Gold
100th Window	Released: 10 February 2003 (UK); Label: Virgin; Formats: CD, LP, digital download	1	4	4	1	1	3	9	5	1	69	US: 180,000 (Note: Sales as of February 2010)	BPI: Gold; ARIA: Gold; BRMA: Gold; IFPI AUT: Gold; IFPI SWI: Gold; MC: Gold
Heligoland	Released: 8 February 2010 (UK); Label: Virgin; Formats: CD, LP, digital download	6	8	5	1	2	4	5	7	2	46	UK: 122,187 (Note: Sales as of February 2021)	BPI: Gold; SNEP: Gold
"—" denotes a recording that did not chart or was not released in that territory.

=== Compilations ===
List of compilation albums, with selected chart positions and certifications
Title	Album details	Peak chart positions									Sales	Certifications
Title	Album details	UK	AUS	AUT	BEL	GER	NLD	NZ	SWI	US	Sales	Certifications
Singles 90/98	Released: 7 December 1998 (UK); Label: Virgin; Formats: 12"/CD box sets	118	—	—	—	—	—	—	—	—		
Collected	Released: 27 March 2006 (UK); Label: Virgin; Formats: LP, CD, DualDisc	2	19	13	1	24	19	3	4	198	UK: 692,608 (Note: Sales as of February 2021)	BPI: 2× Platinum; BRMA: Gold; IFPI SWI: Gold; SNEP: Gold
Selected	Released: 4 April 2006 (UK); Label: Virgin; Formats: digital download	—	—	—	—	—	—	—	—	—		
"—" denotes a recording that did not chart or was not released in that territory.

=== Remix albums ===
List of remix albums, with selected chart positions
Title	Album details	Peak chart positions	
Title	Album details	UK	NZ
No Protection (with Mad Professor)	Released: 20 February 1995 (UK); Label: Gyroscope; Formats: CD, cassette, LP	10	29
Blue Lines – The Remixes	Released: 30 January 2006 (UK); Label: Virgin; Formats: Digital download	—	—
Protection – The Remixes	Released: 30 January 2006 (UK); Label: Virgin; Formats: Digital download	—	—
Mezzanine – The Remixes	Released: 30 January 2006 (UK); Label: Virgin; Formats: Digital download	—	—
100th Window – The Remixes	Released: 30 January 2006 (UK); Label: Virgin; Formats: Digital download	—	—
"—" denotes a recording that did not chart or was not released in that territory.

=== Soundtrack albums ===
List of soundtrack albums, with selected chart positions
Title	Album details	Peak chart positions			
Title	Album details	UK	BEL (FL)	FRA	SWI
Danny the Dog	Released: 11 October 2004 (UK); Label: Gyroscope; Formats: CD	70	65	60	92

== EPs ==
List of extended plays, with selected chart positions
Title	Details	Peak chart positions		
Title	Details	UK	AUS	SWI
Massive Attack EP	Released: 10 February 1992 (UK); Label: Circa, Wild Bunch; Formats: CD, 7", 12", cassette	27	49	35
Bite Size Massive Attack	Released: 25 December 2006 (UK); Label: Virgin; Formats: Digital download	—	—	—
Splitting the Atom	Released: 4 October 2009 (UK); Label: Virgin; Formats: 12", digital download	64	—	68
Atlas Air	Released: 21 November 2010 (UK); Label: Virgin; Formats: 12", digital download	—	—	—
Ritual Spirit	Released: 28 January 2016 (UK); Label: Virgin; Formats: 12", digital download	—	—	—
Eutopia	Released: 12 July 2020; Formats: digital	—	—	—
"—" denotes a recording that did not chart or was not released in that territory.

== Singles ==
List of singles, with selected chart positions, showing year released and album name
Title	Year	Peak chart positions										Certifications	Album
Title	Year	UK	AUS	AUT	BEL	CAN	GER	NLD	NZ	SWI	US Bub.	Certifications	Album
"Any Love"	1988	168	—	—	—	—	—	—	—	—	—		Non-album single
"Daydreaming"	1990	81	—	—	—	—	—	—	—	—	—		Blue Lines
"Unfinished Sympathy"	1991	13	95	—	15	—	17	2	48	9	—	BPI: Platinum; RMNZ: Gold	Blue Lines
"Safe from Harm"	1991	25	132	23	—	—	33	28	—	15	—		Blue Lines
"Sly"	1994	24	98	—	—	—	—	—	—	—	—		Protection
"Protection"	1995	14	91	—	—	—	—	—	27	—	—		Protection
"Karmacoma"	1995	28	114	—	—	—	—	—	19	—	—		Protection
"Risingson"	1997	11	—	—	43	—	—	—	30	—	—		Mezzanine
"Teardrop"	1998	10	16	—	— (Note: "Teardrop" did not enter the Flanders Ultratop Top 50 but peaked at number 17 on the Flanders Ultratip Bubbling Under chart.)	—	52	64	19	75	10	BPI: 2× Platinum; RMNZ: 2× Platinum	Mezzanine
"Angel"	1998	30	129	—	—	—	—	—	33	—	—	BPI: Gold; RMNZ: Gold	Mezzanine
"Inertia Creeps"	1998	—	—	—	—	—	—	—	16	—	—		Mezzanine
"Special Cases"	2003	15	—	—	—	25	—	—	—	—	—		100th Window
"Butterfly Caught"	2003	— (Note: "Butterfly Caught" was deemed ineligible to enter the UK Singles Chart by the Official Charts Company, as it exceeded the maximum track length for a release to be considered a single; it did, however, peak at number 1 on the UK Budget Albums Chart.)	—	—	—	—	—	—	—	—	—		100th Window
"Live with Me"	2006	17	—	58	— (Note: "Live with Me" did not enter the Flanders Ultratop Top 50 but peaked at number two on the Flanders Ultratip Bubbling Under chart.)	—	74	—	—	64	—		Collected
"False Flags" / "United Snakes"	2006	158	—	—	—	—	—	—	—	—	—		Collected
"Psyche"	2009	—	—	—	— (Note: "Psyche" did not enter the Flanders Ultratop Top 50 but peaked at number 17 on the Flanders Ultratip Bubbling Under chart.)	—	—	—	—	—	—		Heligoland
"Paradise Circus"	2010	117	—	—	33	—	—	—	—	41	—	BPI: Silver; RMNZ: Gold	Heligoland
"Four Walls" (with Burial)	2011	—	—	—	—	—	—	—	—	—	—		Non-album singles
"The Spoils"	2016	— (Note: "The Spoils" did not enter the UK Singles Chart but peaked at number 50 on the UK Physical Singles Chart.)	—	—	— (Note: "The Spoils" did not enter the Flanders Ultratop Top 50 but charted as an "extra tip" on the Flanders Ultratip Bubbling Under chart.)	—	—	—	—	—	—		Non-album singles
"Dear Friend"	2016	—	—	—	—	—	—	—	—	—	—		Non-album singles
"Boots on the Ground" (featuring Tom Waits)	2026	— (Note: "Boots on the Ground" did not enter the UK Singles Chart but peaked at number 18 on the UK Singles Sales Chart.)	— (Note: "Boots on the Ground" did not enter the ARIA Singles Chart but peaked at number 34 on the ARIA Digital Track Chart.)	—	—	—	—	—	—	—	—		Non-album singles
"—" denotes a recording that did not chart or was not released in that territory.

== Other charted songs ==
List of singles, with selected chart positions, showing year released and album name
Title	Year	Peak chart positions					Album
Title	Year	UK	UK Dance	FRA	MEX Air.	SCO	Album
"Girl I Love You"	2010	—	—	—	35	—	Heligoland
"Ritual Spirit" (with Azekel)	2016	—	—	30	—	—	Ritual Spirit
"Dead Editors" (with Roots Manuva)	2016	164	38	—	—	83	Ritual Spirit
"The Spoils" (featuring Hope Sandoval)	2016	—	—	53	—	—	The Spoils
"Come Near Me" (with Ghostpoet)	2016	—	—	110	—	—	The Spoils
"—" denotes a recording that did not chart or was not released in that territory.

== Other songs ==
- "The Hunter Gets Captured by the Game" with Tracey Thorn – Batman Forever soundtrack (1995)
- "I Want You" with Madonna – Inner City Blues: The Music of Marvin Gaye (1995) and Something to Remember (1995)
- "Nature Boy" with David Bowie – Moulin Rouge! Music from Baz Luhrmann's Film (2001)
- "I Against I" with Mos Def – Blade II soundtrack (2002)

== Remixes ==
List of produced remixes by Massive Attack for other artists, showing year released and release name
Year	Artist	Release	Song(s)
1989	Neneh Cherry	"Manchild" 12"-single	"Manchild (Massive Attack Remix)" "Manchild (Massive Attack Bonus Beats)"
1990	Nusrat Fateh Ali Khan	Mustt Mustt album	"Mustt Mustt (Massive Attack Remix)"
1990	Nusrat Fateh Ali Khan	"Mustt Mustt" single	"Mustt Mustt (Duck Pond Dub Mix)" "Mustt Mustt (7 Inch Edit)"
1990	Lisa Stansfield	"Live Together"	"Live Together (Big Beats Mix)"
1990	Jesus Loves You	"One on One"	"One on One (Massive Attack Mix / Edit)"
1991	Sean Oliver	The Hard Sell compilation	"Furious Fire (Massive Attack + Jeremy Allom Reconstruction)"
1992	Kwanzaa Posse	"African Vibrations"	"African Vibration (Massive Attack Hilltop Mix)"
1993	Peter Gabriel	"Steam"	"Games Without Frontiers (Massive/DB Mix)"
1993	Les Negresses Vertes	"Face à la mer"	"Face à la mer (Massive Attack Remix)"; Full Version / Radio Edit / Instrumental
1995	U2	Melon: Remixes for Propaganda	"Mysterious Ways (Massive Attack Remix)"
1996	Indo Aminata	"Love Will Be on Your Side"	"Love Will Be on Your Side (Massive Attack Tabla Remix)"
1996	Garbage	"Milk (Remixes)"	"Milk (The Classic Remix)" "Milk (Massive Attack Trance Mix)" "Milk (Massive Attack D Mix)"
1998	Manic Street Preachers	"If You Tolerate This Your Children Will Be Next"	"If You Tolerate This Your Children Will Be Next (Massive Attack Remix / Instrumental Remix)"
2000	Primal Scream	"Kill All Hippies"	"Exterminator (Massive Attack Remix)"
2001	The Dandy Warhols	"Godless"	"Godless (Massive Attack Mix / Mix Dub / Mix Instrumental)"
2004	A Perfect Circle	Amotion	"3 Libras (All Main Courses Remix)"
2015	Garbage	Garbage (20th Anniversary Super Deluxe)	"Milk (Massive Attack Primal Mix)" "Milk (Massive Attack Ultra Classic Mix)"

== Music videos ==
List of music videos, showing year released and director
Title	Year	Director(s)
"Daydreaming"	1990	Baillie Walsh
"Unfinished Sympathy"	1991	Baillie Walsh
"Safe from Harm"	1991	Baillie Walsh
"Be Thankful for What You've Got"	1991	Baillie Walsh
"Sly"	1994	Stéphane Sednaoui
"Protection"	1995	Michel Gondry
"Karmacoma"	1995	Jonathan Glazer
"Risingson"	1997	Walter Stern
"Teardrop"	1998	Walter Stern
"Angel"	1998	Walter Stern
"Inertia Creeps"	1999	W.I.Z.
"Special Cases" (version 1)	2003	H5
"Special Cases" (version 2)	2003	H5
"Butterfly Caught"	2003	Daniel Levi
"Live with Me" (version 1)	2006	Jonathan Glazer
"Live with Me" (version 2)	2006	Jonathan Glazer
"False Flags"	2006	Paul Gore
"United Snakes"	2009	UnitedVisualArtists
"Splitting the Atom" (version 1)	2009	Baillie Walsh
"Paradise Circus"	2009	Toby Dye
"Splitting the Atom" (version 2)	2010	Edouard Salier
"Flat of the Blade"	2010	Ewen Spencer
"Saturday Come Slow"	2010	Adam Broomberg, Oliver Chanarin
"Psyche" (version 1)	2010	Dougal Wilson
"Psyche" (version 2)	2010	John Downer
"Atlas Air"	2010	Edouard Salier
"Pray for Rain"	2010	Jake Scott
"Take It There"	2016	Hiro Murai
"Voodoo in My Blood"	2016	Ringan Ledwidge
"Ritual Spirit"	2016	Medium, Robert Del Naja
"Come Near Me"	2016	Ed Morris
"The Spoils"	2016	John Hillcoat
"#CLIMATEEMERGENCY"	2020	Mark Donne, Robert Del Naja
"#TAXHAVENS"	2020	Mark Donne, Robert Del Naja
"#UNIVERSALBASICINCOME"	2020	Mark Donne, Robert Del Naja
"Boots on the Ground"	2026	Massive Attack, thefinaleye
