= Collected (Massive Attack album) =

Greatest hits album by Massive Attack
- Released: 27 March 2006
- Genre: Trip hop; electronica
- Length: 130:00 (CD audio); 86:17 (DVD video)
- Label: Virgin
- Producer: Massive Attack; Robert Del Naja; Jonny Dollar; Cameron McVey; Nellee Hooper; The Insects; Neil Davidge

Massive Attack chronology
Danny the Dog (2004)	Collected (2006)	Splitting the Atom (2009)

Singles from Collected
- 1. "Live with Me" Released: 13 March 2006; 2. "False Flags / United Snakes" Released: June 2006

Professional ratings
Review scores
Source	Rating
AllMusic	4/5 stars
BBC Music	favourable
Pitchfork	8.3/10
Rolling Stone	4/5 stars

Collected is a compilation album by British trip hop collective Massive Attack, released on 27 March 2006. The album was preceded by the release of the single "Live with Me" on 13 March. It collects most of the band's singles up until this point.

== Track listing ==
Disc 1
No.	Title	Writer(s)	Featuring	Length
1.	"Safe from Harm"	Cobham; Del Naja; Marshall; Nelson; Vowles	Shara Nelson	5:19
2.	"Karmacoma"	Del Naja; Locke; Marshall; Norfolk; Thaws; Vowles	Tricky	5:14
3.	"Angel"	Del Naja; Hinds; Marshall; Vowles	Horace Andy	6:14
4.	"Teardrop"	Del Naja; Fraser; Marshall; Vowles	Elizabeth Fraser	5:28
5.	"Inertia Creeps"	Del Naja; Marshall; Vowles		5:54
6.	"Protection"	Del Naja; Marshall; Thorn; Vowles	Tracey Thorn	7:45
7.	"Butterfly Caught"	Davidge; Del Naja		5:08
8.	"Unfinished Sympathy"	Del Naja; Marshall; Nelson; Sharp; Vowles	Shara Nelson	5:12
9.	"Risingson"	Del Naja; Marshall; Reed; Seeger; Vowles		4:57
10.	"What Your Soul Sings"	Davidge; Del Naja; O'Connor	Sinéad O'Connor	6:37
11.	"Future Proof"	Davidge; Del Naja		5:42
12.	"Five Man Army"	Del Naja; Marshall; Thaws; Vowles; Williams	Willie Wee, Tricky and Horace Andy	5:21
13.	"Sly"	Del Naja; Goldman; Hooper; Marshall; Suwoton; Vowles	Nicolette	4:56
14.	"Live with Me"	Callier; Davidge; Del Naja	Terry Callier	4:51
Total length:				78:45

Strings arranged by Craig Pruess (track 7), Wil Malone (track 8), Neil Davidge (track 10), Craig Armstrong (track 13), and Michael Jennings (track 14).

- Tracks 1, 8 and 12 are from Blue Lines
- Tracks 2, 6 and 13 are from Protection
- Tracks 3, 4, 5 and 9 are from Mezzanine
- Tracks 7, 10, 11 are from 100th Window
- Track 14 is a single promoting this compilation
- Tracks 7, 12, 13 are edited versions exclusive to this compilation
- Track 11 is slightly longer than the album version.

=== Disc two ===
Some editions of the album come with a bonus Dual Disc. The CD layer features rare material, while the DVD layer comprises all the band's music videos to date. Some editions of this special version, such as the Japanese and Argentinian issues, include, instead of the DualDisc, a second, standard audio CD with the rarities' content of the CD layer of the DualDisc, along with a separate DVD containing the music videos. The Argentinian version DVD (catalogue number 50999 5082759 6, distributed by EMI Odeon) contains the Eleven Promos DVD from 2002 (which corresponds to the first 11 videos of the DVD layer on the DualDisc distributed with other versions).

Disc 2, CD layer
No.	Title	Writer(s)	Featuring	Length
1.	"False Flags"	Davidge; Del Naja		5:40
2.	"Incantations"	Davidge; Del Naja; Marshall	Horace Andy	3:19
3.	"Silent Spring"	Davidge; Del Naja; Fraser	Elizabeth Fraser	3:07
4.	"Bullet Boy"	Davidge; Del Naja		4:04
5.	"Black Melt"	Del Naja; Fraser; Marshall; Vowles	Elizabeth Fraser	5:12
6.	"Joy Luck Club"	Clare; Davidge; Del Naja	Debbie Clare	4:58
7.	"Small Time Shoot 'Em Up"	Davidge; Del Naja; Marshall	2D	6:44
8.	"I Against I"	Davidge; Del Naja; Marshall; Smith	Mos Def	5:42
9.	"I Want You"	Ross; Ware	Madonna	6:21
10.	"Danny the Dog"	Davidge; Del Naja	Lorna Marshall	6:02
Total length:				51:15

- Tracks 1, 3 and 6 are previously unreleased
- Track 2 is a remix of "Everywhen" from 100th Window
- Track 4 from Bullet Boy
- Track 5 is a new version of "Black Milk" from Mezzanine without Manfred Mann's "Tribute" sample
- Track 7 is a version of "Small Time Shot Away" from 100th Window
- Track 8 from Blade II
- Track 9 from Inner City Blues: The Music of Marvin Gaye
- Track 10 from Unleashed

Credits:

- Robert Del Naja sings on tracks 1, 4, and 7, plays keyboards on tracks 3, 5, and 7, and scratches on track 1.
- Neil Davidge plays keyboards on tracks 1, 3, 4, 5, 7, and 10, guitar on tracks 1, 4, and 6, bass on track 7, and provides backing vocals on track 4.
- Angelo Bruschini plays guitar on tracks 2, 5, and 7.
- Alex Swift plays guitar on track 5 and keyboards on track 7.
- Damon Reece plays drums on tracks 1 and 7.
- Louise Jeffery plays violin on track 6.
- On track 10 collaborated in addition: Craig Pruess (conductor [strings], strings [scored by]), John Baggot (keyboards), Gavyn Wright (orchestra leader), Isobel Griffiths (orchestra [fixer]), Louise Jeffery (piano, strings [additional scoring]), and Stuart Gordon (violin).
- Track 1 features a sample from Radiohead's "The Bends" towards the end.

Disc 2, DVD layer
No.	Title	Writer(s)	Director	Length
1.	"Daydreaming" (featuring Shara Nelson)	Badarou; Del Naja; Marshall; Thaws; Vowles	Baillie Walsh
2.	"Unfinished Sympathy" (featuring Shara Nelson)	Del Naja; Marshall; Nelson; Sharp; Vowles	Baillie Walsh
3.	"Safe From Harm" (featuring Shara Nelson)	Cobham; Del Naja; Marshall; Nelson; Vowles	Baillie Walsh
4.	"Be Thankful for What You've Got" (featuring Tony Bryan)	DeVaughn	Baillie Walsh
5.	"Sly" (featuring Nicolette)	Del Naja; Goldman; Hooper; Marshall; Suwoton; Vowles	Stéphane Sednaoui
6.	"Protection" (featuring Tracey Thorn)	Del Naja; Marshall; Thorn; Vowles	Michel Gondry
7.	"Karmacoma" (featuring Tricky)	Del Naja; Locke; Marshall; Norfolk; Thaws; Vowles	Jonathan Glazer
8.	"Risingson"	Del Naja; Marshall; Reed; Seeger; Vowles	Walter Stern
9.	"Teardrop" (featuring Elizabeth Fraser)	Del Naja; Fraser; Marshall; Vowles	Walter Stern
10.	"Angel" (featuring Horace Andy)	Del Naja; Hinds; Marshall; Vowles	Walter Stern
11.	"Inertia Creeps"	Del Naja; Marshall; Vowles	Wiz
12.	"Special Cases" (featuring Sinéad O'Connor)	Davidge; Del Naja; O'Connor	H5
13.	"Butterfly Caught"	Davidge; Del Naja	Daniel Levi
14.	"Live With Me" (featuring Terry Callier)	Callier; Davidge; Del Naja	Jonathan Glazer
15.	"Live With Me (alternative version)" (featuring Terry Callier)	Callier; Davidge; Del Naja	Jonathan Glazer
16.	"False Flags"	Davidge; Del Naja	Paul Gore
Total length:				86:17

== Charts ==
=== Weekly charts ===
Chart (2006)	Peak position
Australian Albums (ARIA)	19
Austrian Albums (Ö3 Austria)	13
Belgian Albums (Ultratop Flanders)	1
Belgian Alternative Albums (Ultratop Flanders)	1
Belgian Albums (Ultratop Wallonia)	5
Dutch Albums (Album Top 100)	19
Finnish Albums (Suomen virallinen lista)	8
German Albums (Offizielle Top 100)	24
Irish Albums (IRMA)	1
Italian Albums (FIMI)	6
New Zealand Albums (RMNZ)	3
Norwegian Albums (VG-lista)	8
Portuguese Albums (AFP)	2
Scottish Albums (OCC)	2
Spanish Albums (PROMUSICAE)	38
Swedish Albums (Sverigetopplistan)	38
Swiss Albums (Schweizer Hitparade)	4
UK Albums (OCC)	2
UK Album Downloads (OCC)	3
UK Dance Albums (OCC)	1
US Billboard 200	198
US Top Dance Albums (Billboard)	5

=== Year-end charts ===
Chart (2006)	Position
Australian Dance Albums (ARIA)	20
Belgian Albums (Ultratop Flanders)	22
Belgian Alternative Albums (Ultratop Flanders)	13
Belgian Albums (Ultratop Wallonia)	68
Swiss Albums (Schweizer Hitparade)	95
UK Albums (OCC)	33
US Top Dance/Electronic Albums (Billboard)	23

== Certifications ==
Region	Certification	Certified units/sales
Belgium (BRMA)	Gold	25,000^{*}
France (SNEP)	Gold	75,000^{*}
Greece (IFPI Greece)	Gold	7,500^{^}
Ireland (IRMA)	Platinum	15,000^{^}
Italy (FIMI) sales since 2009	Gold	25,000^{*}
New Zealand (RMNZ)	Gold	7,500^{^}
Portugal (AFP)	Gold	10,000^{^}
Switzerland (IFPI Switzerland)	Gold	15,000^{^}
United Kingdom (BPI)	2× Platinum	692,608
Summaries
Europe (IFPI)	Platinum	1,000,000^{*}
^{*} Sales figures based on certification alone.^{^} Shipments figures based on certification alone.
