= Singles 90/98 =

1998 compilation album by Massive Attack

Compilation album by Massive Attack
- Released: 7 December 1998
- Recorded: 1990–1998
- Genre: Trip hop; downtempo; electronica
- Length: 6:00:20
- Label: Virgin; Circa

Massive Attack chronology
Mezzanine (1998)	Singles 90/98 (1998)	100th Window (2003)

Professional ratings
Review scores
Source	Rating
The Encyclopedia of Popular Music	4/5 stars

Singles 90/98 is a limited edition 11 disc compilation album by Massive Attack, released in 1998. It features all their vinyl and CD singles collected until 1998 with B-sides and remixes totalling 63 tracks. It peaked at number 18 on the UK R&B Albums Chart.

The box set is designed by Tom Hingston and Massive Attack's Robert Del Naja. It is packaged in a 5" × 5" black box made of thermally treated paper which turns white when touched or when heat is applied. The actual discs are housed in 11 cardboard sleeves with new artwork not found on the original singles.

The elaborate packaging of the 11 disc box set.

== Track listing ==
=== Disc 1 ===
1. "Daydreaming (Album Version)" – 4:12
2. "Daydreaming (Luv It Mix)" – 5:26
3. "Daydreaming (Brixton Bass Mix)" – 5:22
4. "Daydreaming (Luv It Dub)" – 5:25
5. "Any Love" – 4:16

=== Disc 2 ===
1. "Unfinished Sympathy (Original)" – 5:14
2. "Unfinished Sympathy (Nellee Hooper 7" Mix)" – 4:33
3. "Unfinished Sympathy (Nellee Hooper 12" Mix)" – 5:49
4. "Unfinished Sympathy (Perfecto Mix)" – 5:17
5. "Unfinished Sympathy (Instrumental)" – 4:08

=== Disc 3 ===
1. "Safe from Harm (Original)" – 5:18
2. "Safe from Harm (7" Version)" – 4:26
3. "Safe from Harm (12" Version)" – 6:55
4. "Safe from Harm (Perfecto Mix)" – 8:13
5. "Safe from Harm (Just a Groove Dub)" – 3:15
6. "Safe from Harm (Just a Dub)" – 3:13

=== Disc 4 ===
1. "Hymn of the Big Wheel (Original)" – 6:36
2. "Hymn of the Big Wheel (Nellee Hooper Mix)" – 5:52
3. "Home of the Whale" – 4:08
4. "Be Thankful for What You've Got (Perfecto Mix)" – 6:17
5. "Any Love (Larry Heard Mix)" – 4:27

=== Disc 5 ===
1. "Sly (Album Version)" – 5:26
2. "Sly (7" Edit)" – 4:11
3. "Sly (7 Stones Mix)" – 5:58
4. "Sly (Underdog Mix)" – 5:19
5. "Sly (Underdog Double Bass & A cappella)" – 3:37
6. "Sly (Cosmic Dub)" – 5:26
7. "Sly (Eternal Feedback Dub)" – 6:25

=== Disc 6 ===
1. "Protection (Album Version)" – 7:51
2. "Protection (7" Edit)" – 4:53
3. "Protection (Underdog's Angel Dust Mix)" – 7:35
4. "Protection (Radiation for the Nation)" – 8:33
5. "Protection (The Eno Mix)" – 9:10
6. "Protection (J Sw!ft Mix)" – 7:13

=== Disc 7 ===
1. "Karmacoma (Album Version)" – 5:17
2. "Karmacoma (Portishead Experience)" – 3:58
3. "Karmacoma (Napoli Trip by Almamegretta)" – 6:04
4. "Karmacoma (U.N.K.L.E. Situation)" – 5:37
5. "Karmacoma (Bumper Ball Dub)" – 5:57
6. "Karmacoma (Ventom Dub Special)" – 6:04
7. "Blacksmith/Daydreaming" – 5:23

=== Disc 8 ===
1. "Risingson (Album Version)" – 4:59
2. "Superpredators" – 5:46
3. "Risingson (Underdog Mix)" – 6:05
4. "Risingson (Otherside)" – 5:43
5. "Risingson (Underworld Mix)" – 8:40

=== Disc 9 ===
1. "Teardrop (LP Version)" – 5:29
2. "Teardrop (Scream Team Remix)" – 6:44
3. "Teardrop (Mad Professor Mazaruni Vocal Mix)" – 6:06
4. "Teardrop (Mad Professor Mazaruni Instrumental)" – 6:23
5. "Euro Zero Zero" – 4:24

=== Disc 10 ===
1. "Angel (Album Version)" – 6:19
2. "Angel (Radio Edit)" – 5:24
3. "Angel (Blur Remix)" – 6:21
4. "Angel (Mad Professor Remix)" – 6:15
5. "Group Four (Mad Professor Remix)" – 7:51

=== Disc 11 ===
1. "Inertia Creeps (Album Version)" – 5:32
2. "Inertia Creeps (Radio Edit)" – 4:09
3. "Inertia Creeps (Manic Street Preachers Version)" – 5:02
4. "Inertia Creeps (State of Bengal Mix)" – 6:23
5. "Inertia Creeps (Alpha Mix)" – 5:54
6. "Back/Shecomes" – 6:07
7. "Reflection" – 4:52

== Personnel ==
Credits adapted from liner notes.

- Tom Hingston – art direction, design
- Robert Del Naja – art direction, design, images
- Artomatic – box production

== Charts ==
Chart performance for Singles 90/98
Chart (1998)	Peak position
UK R&B Albums (OCC)	18
