= Neil Davidge =

British composer (born 1962)

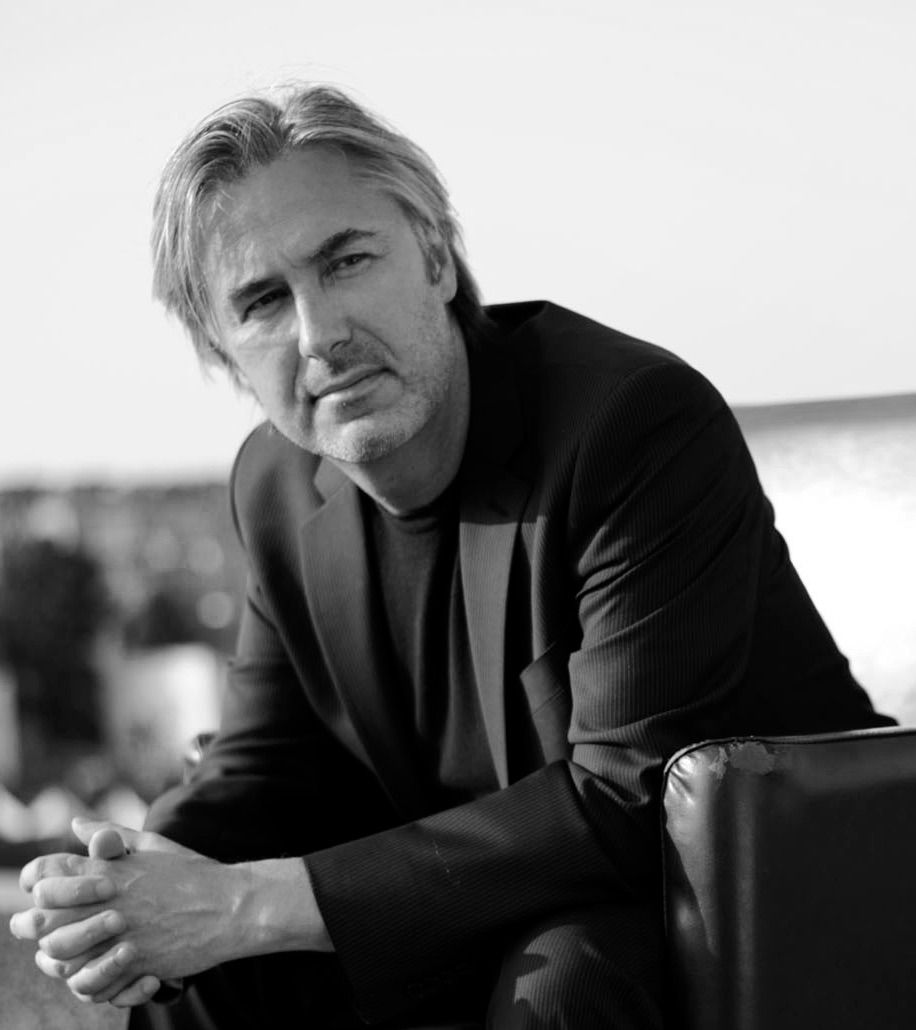
- Davidge in 2014

Background information
- Born: Bristol, England
- Genres: Trip hop, film score, industrial
- Occupations: Record producer, songwriter, film score composer, musician
- Instruments: Bass, keyboards, guitar, drums

Neil Davidge is an English record producer, songwriter, film score composer and musician. Once an associate of dance musicians DNA, he is best known as the long-term co-writer and producer for trip hop collective Massive Attack. In 1997, he also produced the Sunna album One Minute Science. He has an established career as a film score composer, working on such films as Push, Bullet Boy, Trouble the Water, and Clash of the Titans.

Artists he has worked with include Unkle, Damon Albarn, Elizabeth Fraser, Mos Def, David Bowie, and Snoop Dogg.

In 2012, he composed the Halo 4 Original Soundtrack, scoring the music included in the video game Halo 4. He also recorded "The Storm That Brought Me to You" with Tina Dico and Ramin Djawadi for the Clash of the Titans soundtrack, the first vocal track for which he is credited as an artist separately from Massive Attack.

In 2017, Davidge composed the critically acclaimed soundtrack for the TV series, Britannia, and in 2023, co-scored Apple TV+'s television series Criminal Record.

== Career ==
=== DNA (1989–1992) ===
Davidge worked with UK duo DNA in the period between 1989 and 1992, co-producing four singles and one album.

=== Massive Attack (1995–2010) ===
Davidge had met Massive Attack's Andrew Vowles as early as 1991, and was in and around Bristol's Coach House Studios when Portishead recorded their debut album Dummy between 1991 and 1994. Davidge was introduced to the rest of Massive Attack in 1996, and hitting it off, he produced "The Hunter Gets Captured by the Game", a song for the Batman Forever soundtrack that featured Everything but the Girl vocalist Tracey Thorn.

Working in close collaboration with Massive's Robert Del Naja, Neil shaped the sound of the band's third album, 1998's Mezzanine, including the song "Teardrop", which became the theme song for the medical drama House. Mezzanine won a Q Award for Best Album and was nominated for a Mercury Award.

As with Mezzanine, Massive Attack's fourth album 100th Window was largely piloted by Davidge and Robert Del Naja. Sessions were protracted and pressurised, the group discarding material to re-write the whole record in the last six months of a three-year odyssey. "Some great things had been said about Mezzanine and we didn't want to repeat ourselves", Davidge said. "It was a strange period of isolation and the weirdness of 9/11, but we got there in the end."

Following the release of 100th Window, Davidge and Del Naja established a new studio in Bristol, which would become the primary recording location for Massive Attack going forward, as well as Davidge and Del Naja's soundtrack projects.

Collected was Massive Attack's best-of album released on 27 March 2006. The album was preceded by the release of the single "Live with Me" on 13 March. "Live with Me" was co-written and produced by Davidge..

Heligoland is the fifth studio album by Massive Attack. Co-produced by Davidge and Robert Del Naja with additional production by Tim Goldsworthy, the record features vocals from Horace Andy, Tunde Adebimpe, Damon Albarn, Hope Sandoval, Guy Garvey and Martina Topley-Bird. Davidge co-wrote eight of the ten tracks as well as playing keyboards, bass and guitar.

=== Film and TV projects (2004–present) ===
In 2004 Luc Besson approached Davidge and Robert Del Naja to score the movie Danny The Dog, later renamed Unleashed. There then followed scores for Bullet Boy, Battle in Seattle, and Trouble the Water, which received an Oscar nomination as Best Documentary Feature. It is a moving study of those displaced by Hurricane Katrina which won 'Best Documentary' at the 2008 Sundance Film Festival. Working with Snoop Dogg, Neil also scored the music for In Prison My Whole Life, a documentary about US death-row journalist Mumia Abu-Jamal.

Away from his collaborations with Robert, Neil scored the music to the Paul McGuigan directed Push and provided additional music to the Warner Brothers film Clash of the Titans working alongside composer Ramin Djawadi. He was approached by director Louis Leterrier to replace Matt Bellamy from Muse who had to pull out due to touring commitments in the USA. Davidge also went on to score the documentary film Citizen Koch, action thriller Good People, and Monsters: Dark Continent, the sequel to Gareth Edwards' Monsters. He also scored two television films for the BBC; drama-documentary 8 Days: To The Moon and Back, co-scored with David Poore, as well as drama Sitting in Limbo, about the 2018 Windrush scandal. Both were nominated for BAFTA Awards, with the latter winning the British Academy Television Award for Best Single Drama at the 2021 British Academy Television Awards.

His first TV score was for the Canal+ series Spotless. This was followed by the scores for New Blood and In the Dark, both of which premiered on BBC One. In 2018 saw the release of Sky Atlantic's Britannia, starring David Morrissey, Mackenzie Crook and Kelly Reilly. The first season of Britannia, featuring Davidge's "stunning" score was closely followed by another Davidge scored show for BBC One, Hard Sun. He has also scored a number of television documentaries, including Amazon Studios' All or Nothing: Tottenham Hotspur, as well as co-scoring BBC Earth's Earth From Space with fellow Bristol-based composer David Poore. Davidge's newest project, Apple TV+'s Criminal Record was released on 10 January 2024. Davidge co-scored the project with Michael Asante.

=== Halo 4 Original Soundtrack (2012) ===
On 11 April 2012, Davidge was revealed to be the composer for the Halo 4 Original Soundtrack, the official soundtrack of the video game Halo 4. A self-professed fan of previous Halo games, he and 343 Industries felt the music needed to change to fit the new trilogy. "The phrase that kept going around was 'evolution not revolution' of the score," he said. "[They wanted a] more electronic, slightly more beat-driven direction, which is one reason why they came to me. They wanted to flesh out, sonically, a new universe. One that they could expand on in subsequent sequels.” The majority of the soundtrack was written in Bristol, and recorded at Abbey Road Studios and Angel Recording Studios, both situated in London. Davidge and his production team enlisted the 50-piece Chamber Orchestra of London, as well as 26 male and female vocalists and other performers.

The Original Soundtrack for Halo 4 was released on 19 October 2012, and debuted at No. 50 on the Billboard 200 chart, becoming the highest peaking video game soundtrack on Billboard's charts. Nearly 9,000 units were sold in the first week alone. This was followed by Halo 4 Original Soundtrack Remixes, featuring remixes by Sander van Doorn & Julian Jordan, Gui Boratto, and Andrew Bayer, as well as an Apocalyptica vs Neil Davidge remix of The Beauty of Cortana. Halo 4 Original Soundtrack Volume 2 was released digitally on 8 April 2013.

=== Slo Light (2014) ===
Davidge established his own studio in 2010. His debut solo album Slo Light was released in February 2014, and features guest vocalists including Low Roar, Sandie Shaw and Cate Le Bon. The album was accompanied by three singles. The first single was "Slo Light", released on 3 December 2013. The second single, "Sleepwalking", released on 20 February 2014, five days before the album's release, followed by the third single, "Riot Pictures", on 7 October 2014.

== Filmography ==
=== As composer ===
==== Film ====
Year	Title	Notes
2004	Bullet Boy	Co-scored with Robert Del Naja
2005	Unleashed	Co-scored with Robert Del Naja
2007	In Prison My Whole Life	Co-scored with Robert Del Naja
2007	Battle In Seattle	Co-scored with Robert Del Naja
2008	Trouble the Water	Co-scored with Robert Del Naja
2009	Push	
2013	Citizen Koch	
2014	Monsters: Dark Continent	
2019	8 Days: To the Moon and Back	Television movie, co-scored with David Poore
2020	Sitting in Limbo	Television movie

==== Television ====
Year	Title	Notes
2015	Spotless	
2016	New Blood	
2017	In the Dark	
2018–2021	Britannia	Seasons 1–3
2018	Hard Sun	
2019	Earth from Space	Co-scored with David Poore
2020	All or Nothing: Tottenham Hotspur	
2021	Earth Moods	
2022	The Fear Index	
2022	Desperate Measures	
2022	Earth Great Rivers II	Co-scored with David Poore
2024	Criminal Record	Co-scored with Michael 'Mikey J' Asante

==== Video games ====
Year	Title	Notes
2012	Halo 4	Additional score by Kazuma Jinnouchi

== Discography ==
=== As solo artist ===
==== Studio albums ====
Year	Artist(s)	Title	Label	Notes
2014	Davidge	Slo Light	7 Hz Productions	

==== Singles ====
Year	Artist(s)	Title	Album	Notes
2013	Davidge	"Slo Light"	Slo Light	Vocals by Stephonik Youth
2013	Davidge	"Gallant Foxes"	Slo Light	Vocals by Cate Le Bon
2014	Davidge	"Sleepwalking"	Slo Light	Vocals by Emi Green
2014	Davidge	"Riot Pictures"	Slo Light	Vocals by Sandie Shaw
2014	Davidge	"Sensor / Anyone Laughing"	Slo Light	Vocals by Claire Tchaikowski & Jhelisa Anderson

=== As composer ===
==== Soundtrack albums ====
Year	Title	Label	Notes
2004	Danny The Dog (Original Motion Picture Soundtrack)	Virgin/EMI	Co-composed with Robert Del Naja, released as Massive Attack
2005	Bullet Boy	Virgin	Co-composed with Robert Del Naja
2012	Halo 4 (Original Soundtrack)	Microsoft Studios/343 Industries/7Hz Productions	
2012	Halo 4 (Original Soundtrack Remixes)	Microsoft Studios/343 Industries/7Hz Productions	
2013	Halo 4 (Original Soundtrack Vol. 2)	Microsoft Studios/343 Industries/7Hz Productions	Additional music by Kazuma Jinnouchi
2015	Spotless (Soundtrack)	7Hz Productions	
2015	Monsters: Dark Continent	7Hz Productions	
2017	Britannia (Music From The Original TV Series)	SATV Music/SATV Publishing	
2019	Britannia II (Music From The Original TV Series)	SATV Music/SATV Publishing	
2021	Music From Earth Moods (Original Soundtrack)	National Geographic Partners	
2021	Britannia II (Music From The Original TV Series)	SATV Music/SATV Publishing	

=== Production and songwriting credits ===
==== Albums ====
===== Studio albums =====
Year	Artist(s)	Title	Label	Notes
1992	DNA	Taste This	EMI	Co-writer (tracks 5, 6 & 8), co-producer (tracks 1, 2, 5–8)
1992	Hugh Cornwell, Roger Cook and Andy West	CCW	UFO	Co-producer (tracks 1–2, 7, 9–10)
1994	Rozalla	Look No Further	Epic	Co-producer (tracks 6, 7, 12)
1994	Toni Pearen	Intimate	Mushroom	Co-producer (tracks 1, 4–6, 8–11, 13)
1998	Massive Attack	Mezzanine	Virgin/Circa	Co-producer
1998	Massive Attack	Singles 90/98	Virgin/Circa	Co-producer ("Risingson", "Teardrop", "Angel", "Inertia Creeps", "Euro Zero Zero")
2000	Lazydog, Redwood	The Redwood LP	None	Co-producer
2000	Sunna	One Minute Science	Virgin/Melankolic	Co-producer
2003	Massive Attack	100th Window	Virgin	Co-writer, co-producer
2006	Massive Attack	Collected	Virgin	Co-writer (Disc 1: tracks 7, 10–11, 14; Disc 2: tracks 1–4, 6–8, 10), co-producer (Disc 1: tracks 3–5, 7, 9–11, 14; disc 2: tracks 1–8, 10)
2009	Terry Callier	Hidden Conversations	Mr Bongo	Co-writer, co-producer (tracks 1, 9, 10)
2010	Massive Attack	Heligoland	Virgin	Co-writer (all tracks except 7 & 9), co-producer

===== Remix albums =====
Year	Artist(s)	Title	Label	Notes
1992	DNA ft. Jo Nye	Blue Love (Call My Name) (Remixes)	EMI	Co-producer, remixer (tracks 1,2)
1992	DNA ft. Sharon Redd	Can You Handle It	EMI	Co-producer (tracks 1–3)

==== Singles ====
Year	Artist(s)	Title	Album	Notes
1984	Big Outdoor Type	"Call You On Sundays"	Non-album single	Co-writer
1990	Intime	"People (Let's Get Along)"	Non-album single	Co-writer
1992	Exposé	"I Specialize in Love"	Exposé	Co-producer
1993	Kim Appleby	"Light of the World"	Breakaway	Co-writer, co-writer
1994	Toni Pearen	"Walkaway Lover"	Intimate	Co-producer
1995	Massive Attack and Tracey Thorn	"The Hunter Gets Captured by the Game"	Batman Forever: Music From The Motion Picture	Co-producer
1995	Toni Pearen	"Joy"	Intimate	Co-producer
1997	Massive Attack	"Risingson"	Mezzanine	Co-producer
1998	Massive Attack	"Teardrop"	Mezzanine	Co-producer
1998	Massive Attack	"Angel"	Mezzanine	Co-producer
1998	Massive Attack	"Inertia Creeps"	Mezzanine	Co-producer
1998	Dannii Minogue	"Coconut"	Girl	Co-producer
2000	Sunna	"Power Struggle"	One Minute Science	Co-producer
2000	Sunna	"O.D"	One Minute Science	Co-producer
2000	Sunna	"I'm Not Trading"	One Minute Science	Co-producer
2001	Lupine Howl	"Vaporizer"	The Carnivorous Lunar Activities of Lupine Howl	Additional production
2002	Massive Attack & Mos Def	"I Against I"	Blade II: The Soundtrack / Special Cases	Co-writer, co-producer
2003	Massive Attack	"Special Cases"	100th Window	Co-writer, co-producer
2003	Massive Attack	"Butterfly Caught"	100th Window	Co-writer, co-producer
2006	Massive Attack	"Live with Me"	Collected	Co-writer, co-producer
2006	Massive Attack	"False Flags" / "United Snakes"	Collected	Co-writer, co-producer
2009	Massive Attack	"Psyche"	Heligoland	Co-writer, co-producer
2010	Massive Attack	"Paradise Circus"	Heligoland	Co-producer

==== Other songs ====
Year	Artist(s)	Title	Album	Notes
1991	Intime	"Second Sight"	The Hard Sell	Co-writer, compilation album track
1993	Beat System	"To A Brighter Day (O' Happy Day)(Radio Edit)"	Platinum On Black	Co-producer, compilation album track
1993	Dannii Minogue	"Be Careful"	Get into You	Co-writer, co-producer
1995	Massive Attack and Tracey Thorn	"The Hunter Gets Captured by the Game"	Batman Forever: Music From The Motion Picture	Co-producer
1995	Massive Attack	"Fake The Aroma"	The Help Album	Co-producer, compilation album track, rework of "Karmacoma"
1997	Massive Attack	"Wire"	Welcome to Sarajevo (Music from the Motion Picture)	Co-writer, co-producer
1997	Massive Attack	"Superpredators (Metal Postcard)"	The Jackal (Music from and Inspired By)	Co-producer
1997	Elizabeth Fraser	"Take Me With You"	The Winter Guest (Original Motion Picture Soundtrack)	Producer
2001	David Bowie & Massive Attack	"Nature Boy"	Moulin Rouge! Music from Baz Luhrmann's Film	Co-producer
2001	Unkle	"Invasion"	Never, Never, Land	Co-writer, co-producer
2007	Unkle	"Twilight"	War Stories	Co-writer, co-producer
2009	Hook And The Twin	"They'll Get Your Head"	Bang Bang Cherry	Co-producer
2009	Sunna	"Heaven Sends"	Two Minute Terror	Co-producer
2010	Ramin Djawadi	"The Storm That Brought Me To You"	Clash of the Titans: Original Motion Picture Soundtrack	Co-composer
2010	Neil Davidge	"Be My Weapon"	Clash of the Titans: Original Motion Picture Soundtrack	Composer

==== Remixes ====
Year	Artist(s)	Title	Album	Notes
1991	Absolute ft. Joe Church	"Don't You Wanna Be Mine (Dub Plus Mix)"	Non-album single	Remixer
1992	Geoffrey Williams	"Summer Breeze (Flowerpot Mix)"	Summer Breeze (The DNA Mixes)	Co-remixer with DNA
1992	Geoffrey Williams	"Summer Breeze (DNA Extended Version)"	Summer Breeze (The DNA Mixes)	Co-remixer with DNA
1996	DJ Food	"Stop Phink (Hidden Chipsters Mix)"	Refried Food Lunchbox	Co-remixer
1996	Massive Attack	"Hymn of the Big Wheel"	The Fan (Music from the Motion Picture)	Co-remixer, remix for The Fan
1998	Unkle	"Rabbit in Your Headlights (3D Mix-Reverse Light)"	Rabbit in Your Headlights	Co-remix with 3D
1998	KC and the Sunshine Band	"Get Down Tonight (Miami Club Mix)"	The Very Best Of	Co-remixer with DNA, co-producer
1998	Manic Street Preachers	"If You Tolerate This Your Children Will Be Next (Massive Attack Remix)"	If You Tolerate This Your Children Will Be Next	Co-remixer
2000	Primal Scream	"Kill All Hippies (Massive Attack Remix)"	XTRMNTR	Co-remixer
2001	The Dandy Warhols	"Godless (Massive Attack Mix)"	Godless	Co-remixer
2001	A Perfect Circle	"3 Libras (All Main Courses Mix)"	Co-remix with 3D	
2003	Primal Scream	"Exterminator (Massive Attack Remix)"	Dirty Hits	Co-remixer
