= Slo Light =

Studio album by Davidge
- Released: 25 February 2014
- Recorded: 2013–2014
- Studios: Christchurch Studios, Bristol, United Kingdom
- Length: 55:11
- Label: 7Hz Productions
- Producer: Neil Davidge

Neil Davidge chronology
Halo 4 Original Soundtrack (2012)	Slo Light (2014)

Singles from Slo Light
- 1. "Slo Light" Released: 3 December 2013; 2. "Sleepwalking" Released: 20 February 2014; 3. "Riot Pictures" Released: 7 October 2014

Professional ratings
Aggregate scores
Source	Rating
Metacritic	64/100
Review scores
Source	Rating
Allmusic	7/10 stars

Slo Light is the debut studio album by English musician, composer, and record producer Neil Davidge, under the name Davidge. The album was released on 25 February 2014, and was produced by Davidge himself. This album marks Davidge's first solo studio album, after several years working as a film score composer and record producer, best known for his collaborations with Massive Attack. The album was recorded in Christchurch Studios, best known for recording of Massive Attack's album, Mezzanine. Former Strangelove's vocalist and guitarist Patrick Duff is featured on two of the album's bonus tracks. The album was met with generally positive reviews from music critics.

A film of the same name, built around the music of the album, and scored by Davidge, was planned and funded successfully through the crowd funding platform Kickstarter. The film completed principal photography in 2018, but as of 2026 has yet to be released.

The album was accompanied by three singles. The first single was "Slo Light", released on 3 December 2013. The second single was "Sleepwalking", released on 20 February 2014, five days before the album's release. The third single was "Riot Pictures", released on 7 October 2014.

== Track listing ==
All songs were written by Neil Davidge, with several collaborators.

Standard version
No.	Title	Length
1.	"Slo Light" (vocals by Stephonik Youth)	5:30
2.	"Gallant Foxes" (vocals by Cate Le Bon)	5:12
3.	"How Was Your Day" (vocals by Karima Francis)	6:35
4.	"Home From Home" (vocals by Low Roar)	5:09
5.	"They Won't Know" (vocals by Stephonik Youth)	5:52
6.	"That Fever" (vocals by Claire Tchaikowski)	4:11
7.	"Riot Pictures" (vocals by Sandie Shaw)	4:47
8.	"Zero One Zero" (vocals by Stephonik Youth)	5:13
9.	"Sleepwalking" (vocals by Emi Green)	5:43
10.	"Anyone Laughing" (vocals by Claire Tchaikowski)	6:59
Total length:		55:11

CD Deluxe Edition bonus track
No.	Title	Length
11.	"Sensor" (vocals by Jhelisa Anderson)	6:09
12.	"Discovering the Universe ("That Fever" ANHM Version)" (Instrumental)	9:00
Total length:		70:20

Vinyl bonus tracks
No.	Title	Length
11.	"Sensor" (vocals by Jhelisa Anderson)	6:09
12.	"Slo Light (Davidge vs. Rob Smith's Lovas Remix)" (vocals by Stephonik Youth)
13.	"Sensor (Davidge vs. Quadrant, Kid Hops & Iris Remix)" (vocals by Jhelia Anderson)
14.	"Sleepwalking (Davidge vs. Michael Mortlock Remix)" (vocals by Emi Green)
15.	"Forty Days in the Wilderness" (vocals by Patrick Duff)	3:31
16.	"Hummingbird" (Instrumental)	8:25

iTunes bonus track
No.	Title	Length
11.	"Hummingbird" (vocals by Patrick Duff)	8:25
Total length:		63:36
