= Risingson =

Single by Massive Attack

from the album Mezzanine
- B-side: "Superpredators"
- Released: 7 July 1997
- Recorded: 1997 at Massive Attack and Christchurch Studios, Bristol
- Genre: Trip hop; electronica
- Length: 4:59
- Label: Virgin Records
- Songwriters: Robert del Naja; Grantley Marshall; Andrew Vowles
- Producer: Neil Davidge

Massive Attack singles chronology
"Karmacoma" (1995)	"Risingson" (1997)	"Teardrop" (1998)

Music video
- "Risingson" on YouTube

"Risingson" is a song by the English trip hop group Massive Attack, released as a single on 7 July 1997 by Virgin Records. It is the first single from their third album, Mezzanine (1998), and the eighth single overall.

== Background and composition ==
The single contains a sample of "I Found a Reason", a song by The Velvet Underground, and a lyrical interpolation of "Where Have All the Flowers Gone?" by Pete Seeger.

== Reception ==
Reception for the song was positive. John Bush of AllMusic described the song as "a dense, dark feature for Massive Attack themselves (on production as well as vocals), with a kitchen sink's worth of dubby effects and reverb." Kevin Courtney from Irish Times declared it "a dark, deep forest of a tune, with vocals by 3D and Daddy G, and extra mixes by Underworld's Darren Emerson." British magazine Music Week rated it four out of five, adding, "Moody, dark atmospherics with prowling bass and gruff raps that suggests a darker approach for the Bristol trio's third LP."

== Music video ==
The accompanying music video for "Risingson" stars all the participating musicians in Mezzanine, excluding the guest singers. They are all in a house while a gimped man with a chainsaw is outside the house. Robert del Naja walks to a window to investigate the man, who is on the other side of the window, but he soon disappears as Del Naja spots him. Del Naja walks and leaves to head upstairs, until he notices the man again and decides to jump down the stairs. He tries to find the man's approximate location outside, but he is already sawing the back door down, near where Mushroom is located. He walks inside and follows Mushroom. Daddy G then walks to the front door and leaves the house, while Del Naja is in another room and spots another person outside climbing the walls. He sits down when there is an explosion behind him.

Along with all the other music videos released with Mezzanine, the video was directed by Walter Stern.

== Personnel ==
Massive Attack

- Robert Del Naja – vocals, producer, arrangements, programming, keyboards, guitars, samples, art direction, design
- Grantley Marshall – vocals, producer, arrangements, programming, keyboards, samples
- Andrew Vowles – producer, arrangements, programming, keyboards, samples

Additional personnel

- Neil Davidge – producer, arrangements, programming, keyboards, samples
- Angelo Bruschini – guitars
- Jon Harris, Bob Locke, Winston Blisset – bass guitars
- Andy Gangadeen – drums
- Dave Jenkins, Michael Timothy – additional keyboards

Recording personnel

- Jan Kybert – ProTools
- Lee Shepherd – engineer (Massive Attack and Christchurch Studios)
- Mark "Spike" Stent – mixing (Olympic Studios)
- Jan Kybert, Paul "P-Dub" Walton – assistant mixing
- Tim Young – editing, engineer (Metropolis Studios)

== Charts ==
Chart (1997)	Peak position
Belgium (Ultratop 50 Flanders)	43
Finland (Suomen virallinen lista)	13
New Zealand (Recorded Music NZ)	30
UK Singles (OCC)	11
