= Angel (Massive Attack song) =

Single by Massive Attack

from the album Mezzanine
- B-side: "Group Four" (Remix)
- Released: 13 July 1998
- Recorded: 1997
- Studio: Massive Attack Studios and Christchurch Studios (Bristol)
- Genre: Trip hop; industrial rock; electronica
- Length: 6:19 (album version); 5:24 (single version)
- Label: Circa; Virgin
- Songwriters: Robert Del Naja; Horace Hinds; Grantley Marshall; Andrew Vowles
- Producers: Neil Davidge; Massive Attack

Massive Attack singles chronology
"Teardrop" (1998)	"Angel" (1998)	"Inertia Creeps" (1998)

Music video
- "Angel" on YouTube

"Angel" is a song by English trip hop group Massive Attack, featuring the vocals and songwriting from Horace Andy, and is partially based on Andy's song "You Are My Angel". It was released as the third single from their third studio album, Mezzanine (1998), on 13 July 1998. "Angel" peaked at number 30 on the UK Singles Chart.

== Background and composition ==
"Angel"
30-second sample of "Angel", starting from the entry of the guitar crescendo. "Angel" shows the group's more guitar driven sound that was described in an AllMusic song review as "perhaps the darkest, heaviest song Massive Attack has ever recorded."

Daddy G, who was the main songwriter on it (along with 3D), described the song as "[starting] something we've got to finish. It was a much bigger thing than any member of the band." The song samples The Incredible Bongo Band song "Last Bongo in Belgium".

== Music video ==
The music video for "Angel", directed by Walter A. Stern and filmed at the Metropolitan Car Park & Old Goods Yard at Paddington, London across three nights, features Daddy G in a car park. He is walking to the exit when 3D, Mushroom and Horace Andy appear behind him. They gradually get closer to him, causing him to feel intimidated. More and more people start following him, which causes him to run outside the car park until he reaches a fence and therefore cannot go any further. As he turns to face the people chasing him, they stop and face him. He then notices that they seem to be mirroring his movements, as if his body controls them. He suddenly charges towards the people that followed him, which causes them to run away.

An edited version of "Angel" is used for the video reducing the length of the video to nearly a minute shorter than the album version. This edit does not appear on any other release besides the video.

Neil Davidge also appears in this video as one of the angry mob chasing Daddy G.

At the time of the single release of "Angel", the band decided (for cited reasons as not capturing the mood of the song) to not use the already shot promo video for "Angel" (which had reputably cost £20,000 to shoot) to promote the single. For this reason the video would remain unseen for over three years where it would finally was released on the Eleven Promos DVD in 2001.

The video has had over 78 million views on YouTube (as of March 2026).

== Critical reception ==
Reception for the song was positive. Amy Hanson of AllMusic describes the song thus: "While the beat here is slow, druggy, and deep, what ultimately drives Angel is the wall of guitars that are reminiscent of a very early Cure".

== Track listing ==
No.	Title	Length
1.	"Angel"	6:19
2.	"Angel" (radio edit)	5:24
3.	"Angel" (Blur remix)	6:21
4.	"Angel" (Mad Professor remix)	6:15
5.	"Group Four" (Mad Professor remix)	7:51
Total length:		32:10

== Personnel ==
Massive Attack

- Robert Del Naja – producer, arrangements, programming, keyboards, samples, art direction
- Grantley Marshall – producer, arrangements, programming, keyboards, guitars, samples
- Andrew Vowles – producer, arrangements, programming, samples, percussions

Additional personnel

- Neil Davidge – producer, arrangements, programming, keyboards, samples
- Horace Andy – vocals
- Angelo Bruschini – guitars
- Jon Harris, Bob Locke, Winston Blisset – bass guitars
- Andy Gangadeen – drums
- Dave Jenkins, Michael Timothy – additional keyboards

Recording personnel

- Jan Kybert – Pro Tools
- Lee Shepherd – engineer (Massive Attack and Christchurch Studios)
- Mark "Spike" Stent – mixing (Olympic Studios)
- Jan Kybert, Paul "P-Dub" Walton – assistant mixing
- Tim Young – editing, engineer (Metropolis Studios)

== In popular culture ==
- Featured in the 1998 episode "Off Profile" of the series La Femme Nikita.
- Used repeatedly in the 1999 film Best Laid Plans starring Reese Witherspoon and Josh Brolin.
- Used in commercials made by Adidas during the 1998 FIFA World Cup.
- Used in 1998 film Pi when Max's landlord is interrogating him.
- Used in 1999 film Go when Ronna goes to buy Ecstasy off Todd.
- Used in the 2000 film Snatch during the caravan park fire scene.
- Used in the 2001 film Antitrust when Milo is being served dinner by Alice (Rebecca).
- Used in the intro of the 2002 relaunch of Top Gear's first series.
- Featured in the 2003 episode "Commencement" of the series The West Wing.
- An instrumental track based on the song was used as the title theme in the 2004 game Vampire: The Masquerade – Bloodlines.
- It was used in Far Cry 2 E3 2008 trailer.
- In the 2005 psychological thriller Stay, "Angel" was used in a strip club scene.
- The song was used in the 2004 movie Flight of the Phoenix, in a tense standoff scene between the main characters and a band of smugglers.
- Used in the Pilot episode of Person of Interest, during a standoff inside an apartment building.
- Used in the opening credits of the movie Firewall (2006) with Harrison Ford
- Featured in the 2012 episode "Island of Dreams" of the series Grimm
- "Angel" has been covered by mathcore band The Dillinger Escape Plan, for their iTunes only EP, Plagiarism, and also by Brazilian metal band Sepultura on their EP Revolusongs and on the special edition of their 2003 album Roorback. Sepultura's cover was featured in the second episode of the Fox series The Following. It has also been covered live by Australian psychedelic group Tame Impala and Norwegian progressive metal band Leprous, which released their version as a single in 2019.
- Featured in the opening credits of Brazilian telenovela Verdades Secretas (English: Hidden Truths).
- The song was used in the Hugo Boss perfume of men by the actor "Ryan Reynolds" in 2009.
- The song was used in the E3 2018 Gameplay Trailer for Metro Exodus.
- Used in an episode of Third Watch
- Featured in first episode of Season 2 of Good Girls.
- Featured in season 7 episode 6 "All or Nothing" of Burn Notice
- Featured in season 4 episode 12 of Waterloo Road
- Featured in the ads of Watchmen
- Used in Balenciaga Spring/Summer 2018 fashion show opening theme
- Used in the 2021 play 2:22 A Ghost Story
- Used in The Mother (2023) starring Jennifer Lopez.

== Charts ==
Chart (1998)	Peak position
Australian Singles Chart	129
New Zealand Singles Chart	33
UK Singles Chart	30

== Certifications ==
Region	Certification	Certified units/sales
United Kingdom (BPI)	Gold	400,000^{‡}
^{‡} Sales+streaming figures based on certification alone.
