= Inertia Creeps =

1998 single by Massive Attack

Single by Massive Attack

from the album Mezzanine
- B-side: "Reflection"
- Released: 19 October 1998
- Recorded: 1997–1998
- Studio: Massive Attack, Christchurch (Bristol, England)
- Genre: Electronica
- Length: 5:56
- Label: Virgin
- Songwriters: Robert del Naja; Grantley Marshall; Andrew Vowles
- Producer: Neil Davidge

Massive Attack singles chronology
"Angel" (1998)	"Inertia Creeps" (1998)	"Special Cases" (2003)

Music video
- "Inertia Creeps" on YouTube

"Inertia Creeps" is a song by English electronic music band Massive Attack, released on 19 October 1998. It was the fourth and final single released off their third album, Mezzanine (1998). It is the least commercially successful of the four singles released from Mezzanine, charting only on the New Zealand Singles Chart at No. 16, but it has been noted as one of the best singles from the album.

== Background and composition ==
The song describes a relationship that Robert del Naja had, which at the time had just ended:

I already had a lot of the lyrics written before. It was just about a relationship I had been going through. It's about being in a situation but knowing you should be out of it but you're too fucking lazy or weak to leave. And you're dishonest to yourself and dishonest to the other person. You're betraying them everyday [sic] and the whole scene feels like it's closing in on you, d'ya-know-what-I-mean? The idea is a combination of movements propelling yourself forward and pulling yourself back at the same time. That's what the track's about—a fucked up relationship basically and there it is.

The rhythm of "Inertia Creeps" has a strong çiftetelli influence, inspired by nights out in Istanbul. Robert del Naja acquired some tapes of such music, which were used as a basis for the song. The song is composed in the key of D-sharp minor and it runs at a tempo of 84 beats per minute. It samples the song "ROckWrok" by new wave band Ultravox.

== Other featured songs ==
The single contains four remixes of the original song, the first from Welsh rock band Manic Street Preachers, the second from British DJ State of Bengal, the third from fellow Bristol trip hop group Alpha, and the fourth titled "Back She Comes" from dub producer Mad Professor, along with another track called "Reflection".

== Music video ==
The music video for "Inertia Creeps" features Robert del Naja sitting on a sofa. He is watching an explicit clip of his partner having sex with who appears to be Mushroom. The clip is directed and recorded by Daddy G, who is in the same room as the extramarital couple. Del Naja is shown to be frequently shocked by the clip (especially a scene where she performs fellatio on Mushroom whilst sitting in a lounge chair); he breathes heavily while watching it, turns away a lot from the camcorder, fast-forwards a lot of the video, and at one point he ends up hiding behind a blanket. The video has received over 10 million views on YouTube.

The lounge chair featured in the videoclip is a knock off of the iconic 1956 Charles and Ray Eames lounge chair as authorised copies of the chair do not feature any kind of lever or wheels.

== Reception ==
In the album review of Mezzanine, John Bush of AllMusic praised "Inertia Creeps", describing the song as the highlight of the album: "Inertia Creeps" could well be the highlight, another feature for just the core threesome. With eerie atmospherics, fuzz-tone guitars, and a wealth of effects, the song could well be the best production from the best team of producers the electronic world had ever seen."

A separate review for the single, also carried out on AllMusic but by Matt Whalley, gave the single 4 stars out of 5, praising the song itself, saying "Between 1990-1998, Massive Attack has never made a single that was more interesting and unmatched in style." The three remixes also received positive attention, with Whalley stating that they took the track into "two unique directions which ensure replay value."

== Track listing ==
No.	Title	Length
1.	"Inertia Creeps"	5:56
2.	"Inertia Creeps" (Radio edit)	4:09
3.	"Inertia Creeps" (Manic Street Preachers version)	5:02
4.	"Inertia Creeps" (State of Bengal remix)	6:23
5.	"Inertia Creeps" (Alpha mix)	5:54
6.	"Back She Comes"	6:07
7.	"Reflection" (Written by Robert del Naja and Neil Davidge only)	4:52
Total length:		37:59

== Personnel ==
Massive Attack

- Robert Del Naja – vocals, producer, arrangements, programming, keyboards, samples, art direction, design
- Grantley Marshall – producer, arrangements, programming, keyboards, samples
- Andrew Vowles – producer, arrangements, programming, keyboards, samples, drums

Additional personnel

- Neil Davidge – producer, arrangements, programming, keyboards, samples
- Angelo Bruschini – guitars
- Jon Harris, Bob Locke, Winston Blisset – bass guitars
- Andy Gangadeen – additional drums, percussion
- Dave Jenkins, Michael Timothy – additional keyboards

Recording personnel

- Jan Kybert – Pro Tools
- Lee Shepherd – engineer (Massive Attack and Christchurch Studios)
- Mark "Spike" Stent – mixing (Olympic Studios)
- Jan Kybert, Paul "P-Dub" Walton – assistant mixing
- Tim Young – editing, engineer (Metropolis Studios)

== Charts ==
Chart (1998)	Peak position
New Zealand (Recorded Music NZ)	16
