= Earth Moods =

Nature documentary series

Earth Moods is an American ambient nature television series produced by National Geographic that premiered on Disney+ on April 16, 2021.

== Premise ==
The series consists of slow-paced, narration-free footage of natural landscapes and urban environments, accompanied by ambient music, with an emphasis on mood rather than traditional documentary storytelling. Music was composed by Neil Davidge.

== Release ==
Earth Moods premiered on Disney+ on April 16, 2021, as part of National Geographic’s original programming lineup for the streaming service.

== Reception ==
In a review for The New York Times, the series was described as a form of ambient television, likened to a screensaver-style viewing experience that prioritizes atmosphere and visual calm over narrative structure. Common Sense Media characterized the series as visually striking and relaxing, noting its suitability for background or calming viewing rather than for viewers seeking informational content or fast-paced storytelling. Jordan Hoffman of Decider described the quality of the series as uneven, writing that it "isn’t a dud, but it’s far from a triumph."
