= Teardrop (song) =

1998 single by Massive Attack

Single by Massive Attack

from the album Mezzanine
- B-side: "Euro Zero Zero"
- Released: 27 April 1998
- Recorded: 1997
- Studio: Massive Attack, Christchurch (Bristol, England)
- Genre: Trip hop
- Length: 5:31
- Label: Circa; Virgin
- Songwriters: Robert Del Naja; Elizabeth Fraser; Grantley Marshall; Andrew Vowles
- Producers: Neil Davidge; Massive Attack

Massive Attack singles chronology
"Risingson" (1997)	"Teardrop" (1998)	"Angel" (1998)

Music video
- "Teardrop" on YouTube

"Teardrop" (also formatted as "Tear Drop") is a song by English trip hop group Massive Attack. Vocals are performed by Scottish singer Elizabeth Fraser, former lead singer of Cocteau Twins, who also wrote the lyrics. It was released on 27 April 1998 by Circa and Virgin as the second single from the group's third studio album, Mezzanine (1998). A harpsichord-driven track, "Teardrop" was originally set to feature vocals from Madonna, whom Massive Attack turned down in favour of Fraser.

In the United Kingdom, "Teardrop" peaked at number 10 on the UK Singles Chart, becoming the group's highest-charting single and only top-10 hit in their native country. It reached number one in Iceland and became a top-20 hit in Australia, Denmark, Ireland and New Zealand. The music video, directed by Walter Stern, features a foetus singing in the womb, and the song has been featured in various television programmes, including as the opening theme for the US television programme House and the Australian show The Lost Flowers of Alice Hart.

== Development ==
According to an article on American Songwriter, "Teardrop" was first developed from a simple harpsichord riff performed by Neil Davidge in the studio in April 1997 with Andrew Vowles listening in. Davidge and Vowles fleshed out the composition and used a sped-up sample from Les McCann’s “Sometimes I Cry” for the beat. Vowles originally sent the demo to Madonna as he wanted her to record the vocals (the band had previously worked with her on their 1995 reworking of the song "I Want You"). However, the two other band members Robert Del Naja and Grantley Marshall wanted Elizabeth Fraser of the Cocteau Twins to record the vocals, feeling her ethereal style suited the mournful melody and feel of the piece. Madonna was very keen to record the vocals, and she was disappointed when the two-to-one vote went in Fraser's favour. In 2023, Andrew Unterberger of Billboard wrote, "How ['Teardrop'] might've sounded with Madonna instead of Liz Fraser on vocals remains one of '90s pop's great what-ifs."

Fraser wrote the song's lyrics, inspired by the works of French philosopher Gaston Bachelard. Many lines in the song are adapted from phrases in the 1971 Bachelard compendium On Poetic Imagination and Reverie:

In the heart of matter there grows an obscure vegetation; in the night of matter black flowers blossom. (p.11)

A shimmer reveals a profound light; a glance sparkling with irony suddenly has a flow of tenderness: a teardrop on the fire of a confession. (p. 32)

With this invitation we register, in our inner being, a gentle impulsion that shakes us, (p. 21)

A dynamic joy touches them, kneads them, makes them lighter. (p. 11)

we understand the profundity of Claudel’s observation: Thus water is the eye of the earth, its apparatus for looking at time. (p. 79)

water becomes a "most faithful mirror of voices" (p. xxi)

While recording the song in 1997, Fraser learned that her former boyfriend, musician Jeff Buckley, had disappeared—later discovered to have drowned. In 2009, she said, "That was so weird .... I'd got letters out and I was thinking about him. That song's kind of about him—that's how it feels to me anyway".

== Critical reception ==
Larry Flick from Billboard wrote, "If there were ever a time for this clique of progressive groovemeisters to solidly connect with the stateside mainstream, it's now. The world has finally caught up with its experimental methods of blending dance rhythms with alterna-pop melodies. On this preview of the album Mezzanine, the band injects a bit of modern rock flavor into the mix - thus, widening the potential for airplay. Added programming incentive is provided by Brendan Lynch and Primal Scream, who add an aggressive bite to a track that bubbles with light electronic instrumentation." A reviewer from Music Week felt that Fraser's "sublime, folky vocals provide the perfect foil to the Massive Attack's trio's metronome-like backing on this haunting first single [...]. An inspired choice of guest singer, she more than measures up to the standards set by Shara Nelson and Tracey Thorn on Massive's previous albums, her undecipherable lyrics adding an intriguing edge." James Hyman from the Record Mirror Dance Update gave "Teardrop" five out of five, declaring it as "predictably dark-edged yet compelling", with Fraser's "uplifting vocals shining over a pendulum-ticking beat".

== Chart performance ==
The single peaked at number 16 in Australia. It was placed number 23 on the Triple J's Hottest 100 of 1998 list and number 22 in the Hottest 100 of All Time in 2009. It reached the top 10 in the UK and is the only Massive Attack track to do so. It was certified Platinum by the British Phonographic Industry on 10 May 2019.

== Music video ==
The song's music video featured a latex foetus in the womb, singing the song. It was directed by Walter Stern.

== Track listings ==
UK, European, and Australian CD single
No.	Title	Length
1.	"Teardrop" (LP version)	5:31
2.	"Euro Zero Zero"	4:22
3.	"Teardrop" (Scream Team remix)	6:43
4.	"Teardrop" (Mad Professor Mazaruni instrumental mix)	6:06

UK 12-inch single
No.	Title	Length
1.	"Teardrop" (Scream Team mix)	6:43
2.	"Teardrop" (LP version)	5:29
3.	"Teardrop" (Mad Professor Mazaruni vocal mix)	6:06
4.	"Euro Zero Zero"	4:22

UK cassette single
No.	Title	Length
1.	"Teardrop" (edit)	4:40
2.	"Teardrop" (Scream Team remix)	6:43
3.	"Euro Zero Zero"	4:22

Japanese CD single
No.	Title	Length
1.	"Teardrop" (LP version)	5:30
2.	"Euro Zero Zero"	4:23
3.	"Teardrop" (Scream Team remix)	6:43
4.	"Teardrop" (Mad Professor Mazaruni instrumental mix)	6:22
5.	"Superpredators" (the Mad Professor remix)	5:12

== Charts ==
=== Weekly charts ===
Chart (1998–2016)	Peak position
Australia (ARIA)	16
Belgium (Ultratip Bubbling Under Flanders)	17
Denmark (Tracklisten)	12
Europe (Eurochart Hot 100)	35
France (SNEP)	115
Germany (GfK)	52
Iceland (Íslenski Listinn Topp 40)	1
Ireland (IRMA)	18
Italy (Musica e dischi)	34
Italy Airplay (Music & Media)	5
Netherlands (Single Top 100)	64
New Zealand (Recorded Music NZ)	19
Scottish Singles Sales (Official Charts)	13
Switzerland (Schweizer Hitparade)	75
UK Singles (Official Charts)	10

=== Year-end charts ===
Chart (1998)	Position
Iceland (Íslenski Listinn Topp 40)	15

== Certifications ==
Region	Certification	Certified units/sales
Denmark (IFPI Danmark)	Gold	45,000^{‡}
Italy (FIMI) sales since 2009	Gold	15,000^{‡}
New Zealand (RMNZ)	2× Platinum	60,000^{‡}
Spain (Promusicae)	Gold	30,000^{‡}
United Kingdom (BPI)	2× Platinum	1,200,000^{‡}
^{‡} Sales+streaming figures based on certification alone.

== Release history ==
Region	Date	Format(s)	Label(s)	Ref(s).
United Kingdom	27 April 1998	12-inch vinyl; CD; cassette	Circa; Virgin	
United States	28 April 1998	Alternative radio	Virgin	

== Notable cover versions ==
=== Newton Faulkner ===
"Teardrop"

Single by Newton Faulkner

from the album Hand Built by Robots
- Released: 30 July 2007
- Length: 3:09
- Label: Ugly Truth
- Songwriters: Robert Del Naja; Elizabeth Fraser; Grantley Marshall; Andrew Vowles
- Producer: Mike Spencer

Newton Faulkner singles chronology
"Dream Catch Me" (2007)	"Teardrop" (2007)	"All I Got" (2007)

Newton Faulkner covered the song on his album Hand Built by Robots, which was produced by Mike Spencer. On downloads alone, Faulkner's version reached number 60 on the UK Singles Chart in August 2007. It was released as an official single on 10 December 2007, and reached number 57 on the chart the following week. The version of the album available from the Australian iTunes Music Store also incorporates an acoustic version.

=== O'Hooley & Tidow ===
English folk music duo O'Hooley & Tidow covered the song on their album The Fragile. The Guardian described their version of "Teardrop" as "an exquisite reworking" and it was voted by Guardian music critic Jude Rogers as one of the best tracks of 2012.

=== José González ===
José González covered "Teardrop" for his second album In Our Nature. The single was released across Europe on 12 November 2007. The single features the non-album instrumental B-side "Four Forks Ache." This version was also featured in the medical drama House M.D. in the episode "Wilson's Heart" as well as in the eighth episode of The Last Dance, ESPN's ten-part documentary series on Michael Jordan and the Chicago Bulls of the 1990s.

=== Civil Twilight ===
South African band Civil Twilight released a cover version on 13 April 2010, included in the record Live from SoHo, available only in iTunes. The band signed with Wind-up Records, and released the studio version of the song as a single on 10 August 2010.

=== The Collective ===
"Teardrop"

Single by the Collective
- Released: 18 November 2011
- Recorded: 2011
- Length: 4:04
- Label: Polydor
- Songwriters: Robert Del Naja; Elizabeth Fraser; Grantley Marshall; Andrew Vowles
- Producers: Gary Barlow; Labrinth

Children in Need singles chronology
"Love You More" (2010)	"Teardrop" (2011)	"Something New" (2012)

The song was covered by English singer Gary Barlow's assembled supergroup named "the Collective" and released as the official single for Children in Need 2011. Produced by Gary Barlow and Labrinth, the performers consist of Chipmunk, Dot Rotten, Ed Sheeran, Ms. Dynamite, Mz. Bratt, Tulisa, Rizzle Kicks, Tinchy Stryder and Wretch 32.

The song was released in the United Kingdom on 13 November 2011 on the Polydor label. and entered the charts at number 24.

==== Charts ====
Chart (2011)	Peak position
Scottish Singles Sales (Official Charts)	30
UK Singles (Official Charts)	24
UK Hip Hop/R&B (Official Charts)	7

==== Release history ====
Region	Date	Format	Label
United Kingdom	13 November 2011	Digital download	Polydor

=== Simple Minds ===
Simple Minds recorded a version for their 2009 covers album Searching for the Lost Boys.

=== VOCES8 ===
Voces8 released a choral version on their 2015 album Lux.

=== The Naked and Famous ===
New Zealand indie electronic band The Naked and Famous recorded a version for their 2018 stripped album A Still Heart. When asked why they decided to record a cover, Thom Powers explained, "It is one of those songs that is an amazing piece of music. It comes from the era that our name comes from. Our name comes from a line in a Tricky song."

=== AURORA ===
Norwegian electro-pop artist AURORA has performed this song several times, most notably at the Verftet festival on 29 March 2020.

=== Hayley Williams ===
"Teardrop"

Single by Hayley Williams
- Released: 15 January 2021
- Length: 3:27
- Label: Atlantic
- Songwriters: Robert Del Naja; Elizabeth Fraser; Grantley Marshall; Andrew Vowles
- Producer: Hayley Williams

Hayley Williams singles chronology
"Dead Horse" (2020)	"Teardrop" (2021)	"Colour Me In" (2021)

American singer Hayley Williams, vocalist of Paramore, uploaded a cover on YouTube and Spotify on 15 January 2021.
