= Live with Me (Massive Attack song) =

2006 single by Massive Attack

Single by Massive Attack with Terry Callier

from the album Collected
- B-side: "False Flags"
- Released: 13 March 2006
- Genre: Trip hop
- Length: 4:51 (album version); 4:02 (radio edit)
- Label: Virgin
- Songwriter(s): Neil Davidge; Robert Del Naja, Terry Callier
- Producer(s): Neil Davidge; Robert Del Naja

Massive Attack singles chronology
"Butterfly Caught" (2003)	"Live with Me" (2006)	"False Flags" (2006)

"Live with Me" is a song by Massive Attack which was included in their 2006 compilation album, Collected, and was also released as a single. The song is notable for the critical acclaim it garnered due to its haunting lyrics, soulful vocals, and emotional string section.

== Vocals ==
Vocals were supplied by the acclaimed soul singer Terry Callier, who was 60 at the time the song was recorded. Callier was an American jazz, soul and folk guitarist singer-songwriter from Chicago, Illinois, who won a UN Peace Award for his humanitarian work promoting peace through his songs.

== Critical reception ==
MusicOMH described the song as "not only a welcome return for the band but a hark back to their glory days, circa Blue Lines and Protection; it is an aching, haunting love song ... that beautifully evokes the pain and longing of failed romance. ... Callier's gloriously emotive vocal that lifts this track far above and beyond average. He succeeds in being both fragile and powerful in a way that previous Massive Attack vocalists Shara Nelson and Tracey Thorn also achieved."

ContractMusic said that "Live With Me" "has a certain dark and sexy groove going on. Partly it's the trade-mark lush, sensual synthetic bass sounds that do it, but mostly it's the authentic soul vocals of Terry Callier that lift this single out of ordinariness and up into the realms of unforgettable musical moments."

Virgin Media described the song as having "some extremely evocative and rich vocals come courtesy of soul legend Terry Callier, who builds 'Live With Me' to a mesmerising climax against a backdrop of lush, expansive strings and a rolling, hypnotic bassline. It's clear the band have lost none of their distinctive edge..."

== Track listings ==
CD (VSCDX1912)

1. "Live with Me"
2. "Live with Me" (alternative version)
3. "False Flags"
4. "Live with Me" video

DVD (VSDVD1912)

1. "Live with Me" video ("director's cut")
2. "False Flags" video
3. "Live with Me" (alternative version)

== Video ==
The video features a young woman drinking heavily, to the point of excess. The video was directed by Jonathan Glazer. One review of the video described it as follows: "It’s uncomfortable viewing, but I found it really haunting. It features a young (mid twenties) professional-looking woman drinking herself into oblivion on her own in her flat. I can’t really put my finger on what it is about it that I find so arresting, but I thought it was an incredibly powerful four minute film."

The setting of the video clip and of the off licence store featuring in it is an area that includes Caledonian Road and Walworth Road in London. The woman is played by Scottish actress Kirsty Shepherd, who was asked to become drunk for real to shoot the video.

The "alternative version" video features a close shot of Terry Callier performing the song.

== Cover versions ==
- The song was covered by the indie rock band The Twilight Singers on A Stitch in Time EP. The vocals were shared between The Twilight Singers' Greg Dulli and guest vocalist Mark Lanegan.

== Other appearances ==
- The song was used at the end of season one, episode three of Person of Interest.

== Charts ==
Chart (2006)	Peak position
UK Singles (OCC)	17
