= Mezzanine (album) =

1998 studio album by Massive Attack

Studio album by Massive Attack
- Released: 20 April 1998
- Recorded: 1997
- Genres: Trip hop; electronica
- Length: 63:29
- Labels: Virgin; Circa
- Producers: Neil Davidge; Massive Attack

Massive Attack chronology
No Protection (1995)	Mezzanine (1998)	Singles 90/98 (1998)

Singles from Mezzanine
- 1. "Risingson" Released: 7 July 1997; 2. "Teardrop" Released: 27 April 1998; 3. "Angel" Released: 13 July 1998; 4. "Inertia Creeps" Released: 21 September 1998

Mezzanine is the third studio album by English electronic music group Massive Attack, released on 20 April 1998 by Circa and Virgin Records. For the album, the group began to explore a darker aesthetic, and focused on a more atmospheric style influenced by British post-punk, industrial music, hip-hop and dub music. The album spawned four singles, "Risingson", "Teardrop", "Angel" and "Inertia Creeps". It was the group's first album not to feature rapper Adrian "Tricky" Thaws and the last to feature Andrew "Mushroom" Vowles. It also marked the first collaboration between Robert "3D" Del Naja and producer Neil Davidge. It also features guest vocals from recurring collaborator Horace Andy, as well as Elizabeth Fraser of Cocteau Twins and Sarah Jay Hawley.

Mezzanine received significant critical acclaim, with many praising the group’s darker sound. It has been named by several publications as one of the best albums of the 1990s and of all time. It is the group's most commercially successful album, topping the charts in the United Kingdom, Australia, Ireland, and New Zealand. It has sold more than 2.5 million copies worldwide.

== Background and recording ==
Mezzanine was conceptualised by lead Massive Attack member Robert Del Naja in 1997, who wanted to focus on exploring a darker audiovisual aesthetic with distinct influences. The production of the album was a stressful process; with tensions arising, it led to disagreements that almost split the group, including discouragement from Andrew Vowles. As a demonstration of the project's sound, Del Naja initially produced instrumental demos sampling songs by British post-punk bands such as Wire and Gang of Four, who had been familiar to him as artists he had enjoyed as a teenager. Grant Marshall supported this direction as he wanted to depart from the "urban soul" of their previous album, Protection, but Vowles was sceptical.

The sessions continued with Vowles and Marshall working on bass and drum loops, while Del Naja continued to produce demos. The album was originally set to be released in December 1997, but was delayed by four months, with Del Naja spending most of the time in the studio "making tracks, tearing them apart, f***ing [sic] them up, panicking, then starting again." Before the album's release, the group released "Superpredators", a non-album song extensively sampling Siouxsie and the Banshees' song "Metal Postcard", for the soundtrack to the 1997 film The Jackal; the track was subsequently included on the Japanese version of Mezzanine.

Andrew "Mushroom" Vowles left the group soon after the album's release, due to creative conflicts, while reggae artist and Massive Attack collaborator Horace Andy contributed to the album on multiple songs. The album's working title was Damaged Goods, which was the name of Gang of Four's 1978 debut single.

Mezzanine was a pretty sketchy album in terms of the way we worked, because the band, as reported a lot at that time, were not getting on. So I'd be in the studio working with one of the members and someone else would come in, then the person I had been working with would leave and I'd have to change the track I was working on because they didn't want to work on that track, they wanted to work on something different. Sometimes I'd be working on perhaps four different tracks in one day, which was a pretty messy way to work.

— Neil Davidge in an interview with Sound on Sound.

The cover art depicts a black beetle on a white background, photographed by Nick Knight at the Natural History Museum in London.

== Composition ==
Mezzanine has been described as a trip hop and electronica album with moods of "dark claustrophobia" and melancholy. Musically, the album is a major departure from the jazzy and laidback sound of the first two albums, Blue Lines and Protection, invoking the dark undercurrents which had previously only been vaguely present in the group's music. The album's textured and deep tone relies heavily on abstract and ambient sounds, heavy emphasis on bass, and influences from alternative rock.

Similar to their previous albums, several songs use one or more samples, which range from artists typically sampled in trip hop such as Isaac Hayes and various drum breaks, to bands like the Cure and the Velvet Underground. In particular, "Inertia Creeps" samples Turkish çiftetelli music which Del Naja recorded after partying in Istanbul, with his recorded tape subsequently becoming the rhythmic base for the song. In 1998, Manfred Mann sued Massive Attack for unauthorised use of a sample of the song "Tribute" from Manfred Mann's Earth Band's eponymous 1972 album, used on "Black Milk". The song has subsequently appeared as "Black Melt" on later releases and at live performances, with the sample removed. Later digital editions of Mezzanine have retained the original song, with Mann being added to the songwriting credits.

== Reception ==
Professional ratings
Review scores
Source	Rating
AllMusic	5/5 stars
Entertainment Weekly	A−
The Guardian	5/5 stars
Los Angeles Times	3.5/4 stars
Muzik	10/10
NME	8/10
Pitchfork	8.1/10 (1998); 9.3/10 (2017)
Rolling Stone	3.5/5 stars
The Rolling Stone Album Guide	4/5 stars
Uncut	5/5 stars

Mezzanine entered the UK Albums Chart at number one, and was certified platinum by the British Phonographic Industry (BPI) on 4 September 1998 and then double platinum on 22 July 2013. However, it failed to share the same success in North America, peaking at number 60 on the Billboard 200 and number 51 on the Canadian Albums Chart.

The album received significant critical acclaim, which praised the collective's new sound. Rolling Stone's Barney Hoskyns, although praising the album, pointed to its flaws: "Sometimes rhythm and texture are explored at the expense of memorable tunes, and the absence of the bizarre Tricky [...] only highlights the flat, monotonous rapping of the group's 3-D." Robert Christgau of The Village Voice gave the album a two-star honorable mention rating and selected "Risingson" and "Man Next Door" as highlights.

John Bush of AllMusic had positive words for the album's song "Inertia Creeps", saying it "could well be the highlight, another feature for just the core threesome. With eerie atmospherics, fuzz-tone guitars, and a wealth of effects, the song could well be the best production from the best team of producers the electronic world had ever seen."

Years after the album was released, it was placed on several best-of lists in the UK and the United States. In 2000, Q magazine placed Mezzanine at number 15 on its list of "The 100 Greatest British Albums Ever". In 2013, it was placed at 215 on NME's list of "The 500 Greatest Albums of All Time". In 2003, the album was ranked number 412 on Rolling Stone magazine's list of "The 500 Greatest Albums of All Time", and while it was not included in the 2012 update of the list, it reentered the 2020 update ranked at number 383.

By April 2000, the album had sold 2.5 million copies worldwide. As of February 2010, it had sold 560,000 copies in the United States, according to Nielsen SoundScan.

== Mezzanine DNA ==
On the 20th anniversary of Mezzanine's release, the record was encoded into synthetic DNA—a first for an album. The project was in collaboration with TurboBeads Labs in Switzerland; the digital audio of the album was stored in the form of genetic information. The audio was then compressed using Opus, coded in DNA molecules—with 920,000 short DNA strands containing all the data—and then poured into 5,000 tiny glass beads.

== 20th anniversary reissue ==
The album was remastered and reissued for its 20th anniversary. The two-CD anniversary edition was released on 23 August 2019, and comes with a bonus disc of previously unreleased dub mixes by Mad Professor, which were originally intended to be released on a Mezzanine remix album. A triple-LP vinyl version was also planned; initially delayed from its proposed release date, the triple-LP version was eventually cancelled.

In lieu of the vinyl reissue, the Mad Professor remixes were released as a pink 12-inch vinyl single entitled Massive Attack v Mad Professor Part II (Mezzanine Remix Tapes '98) on 20 September 2019.

The Mad Professor remixes include "Metal Banshee" (an unreleased dub version of "Superpredators", which was a reworked cover of "Metal Postcard" originally by Siouxsie and the Banshees), and "Wire", a track recorded for the soundtrack to the film Welcome to Sarajevo.

== Track listing ==
Standard edition
No.	Title	Writer(s)	Vocals	Length
1.	"Angel"	Robert Del Naja; Grantley Marshall; Andrew Vowles; Horace Hinds	Horace Andy	6:18
2.	"Risingson"	Del Naja; Marshall; Vowles; Lou Reed; Pete Seeger	3D; Daddy G	4:58
3.	"Teardrop"	Del Naja; Marshall; Vowles; Elizabeth Fraser	Fraser	5:29
4.	"Inertia Creeps"	Del Naja; Marshall; Vowles	3D	5:56
5.	"Exchange"	Bob Hilliard; Mort Garson	(instrumental)	4:11
6.	"Dissolved Girl"	Del Naja; Marshall; Vowles; Sarah Jay Hawley; Matt Schwartz	Hawley	6:07
7.	"Man Next Door"	John Holt	Andy	5:55
8.	"Black Milk"	Del Naja; Marshall; Vowles; Fraser; Manfred Mann	Fraser	6:20
9.	"Mezzanine"	Del Naja; Marshall; Vowles	3D; Daddy G	5:54
10.	"Group Four"	Del Naja; Marshall; Vowles; Fraser	3D; Fraser	8:13
11.	"(Exchange)"	Hilliard; Garson	Andy	4:08
Total length:				63:29

Japanese edition bonus track
No.	Title	Writer(s)	Length
12.	"Superpredators" (The Mad Professor Remix)	Del Naja; Marshall; Vowles; Siouxsie Sioux; John McKay; Steven Severin; Kenny Morris	5:16
Total length:			68:45

20th anniversary reissue disc two: Massive Attack v Mad Professor Part II (Mezzanine Remix Tapes '98)
No.	Title	Writer(s)	Length
1.	"Metal Banshee" (Mad Professor Mix One)	McKay; Morris; Sioux; Severin	5:49
2.	"Angel" (Angel Dust)	Del Naja; Marshall; Hinds; Vowles	6:04
3.	"Teardrop" (Mazaruni Dub One)	Del Naja; Fraser; Marshall; Vowles	6:05
4.	"Inertia Creeps" (Floating on Dubwise)	Del Naja; Marshall; Vowles	6:05
5.	"Risingson" (Setting Sun Dub Two)	Del Naja; Marshall; Vowles	4:53
6.	"Exchange" (Mountain Steppers Dub)	Hilliard; Garson	5:44
7.	"Wire" (Leaping Dub)	Del Naja; Marshall; Vowles	5:21
8.	"Group Four" (Security Forces Dub)	Del Naja; Fraser; Marshall; Vowles	8:14

=== Sample credits ===
- "Risingson" contains a sample of "I Found a Reason" by the Velvet Underground.
- "Exchange" and "(Exchange)" contain samples of "Our Day Will Come" by Isaac Hayes.
- "Man Next Door" contains a sample of "10:15 Saturday Night" by the Cure, as well as an uncredited sample of Led Zeppelin's version of "When the Levee Breaks".

== Personnel ==
Credits adapted from the liner notes of Mezzanine.

=== Massive Attack ===
- Robert Del Naja – arrangements, vocals, programming, keyboards, samples
- Grant Marshall – arrangements, vocals, programming, keyboards, samples
- Andrew Vowles – arrangements, programming, keyboards, samples

=== Additional musicians ===
- Neil Davidge – arrangements, programming, keyboards, samples
- Horace Andy – vocals
- Elizabeth Fraser – vocals
- Sarah Jay Hawley – vocals
- Angelo Bruschini – guitars
- Jon Harris, Bob Locke, Winston Blissett – bass guitars
- Andy Gangadeen – drums
- Dave Jenkins, Michael Timothy – additional keyboards

=== Technical ===
- Massive Attack – production
- Neil Davidge – production
- Jan Kybert – Pro Tools
- Lee Shepherd – engineering
- Mark "Spike" Stent – mixing (Note: Mixed at Olympic Studios (London))
- Jan Kybert – mixing assistance
- P-Dub – mixing assistance
- Tim Young – editing (Note: Edited at Metropolis Studios (London))

=== Artwork ===
- Nick Knight – photography
- Tom Hingston – art direction, design
- Robert Del Naja – art direction, design

== Charts ==
=== Weekly charts ===
1998 weekly chart performance for Mezzanine
Chart (1998)	Peak position
Australian Albums (ARIA)	1
Austrian Albums (Ö3 Austria)	3
Belgian Albums (Ultratop Flanders)	4
Belgian Albums (Ultratop Wallonia)	14
Canada Top Albums/CDs (RPM)	51
Czech Albums (ČNS IFPI)	15
Danish Albums (Hitlisten)	14
Dutch Albums (Album Top 100)	17
European Albums (Music & Media)	1
Finnish Albums (Suomen virallinen lista)	4
French Albums (SNEP)	3
German Albums (Offizielle Top 100)	6
Greek Albums (IFPI)	3
Hungarian Albums (MAHASZ)	14
Icelandic Albums (Tónlist)	1
Irish Albums (IFPI)	1
Italian Albums (FIMI)	3
Japanese Albums (Oricon)	72
New Zealand Albums (RMNZ)	1
Norwegian Albums (VG-lista)	2
Portuguese Albums (AFP)	3
Scottish Albums (Official Charts)	2
Spanish Albums (AFYVE)	19
Swedish Albums (Sverigetopplistan)	4
Swiss Albums (Schweizer Hitparade)	6
UK Albums (Official Charts)	1
UK Dance Albums (OCC)	1
US Billboard 200	60

Weekly chart performance for Mezzanine Remix Tapes '98
Chart (2019–2020)	Peak position
Greek Albums (IFPI)	5
UK Albums Sales (OCC)	32
UK Dance Albums (Official Charts)	3
UK Physical Albums (OCC)	22
UK Vinyl Albums (OCC)	5

2021 weekly chart performance for Mezzanine
Chart (2021–2026)	Peak position
Croatian International Albums (HDU)	29
Greek Albums (IFPI)	5

=== Year-end charts ===
1998 year-end chart performance for Mezzanine
Chart (1998)	Position
Australian Albums (ARIA)	53
Austrian Albums (Ö3 Austria)	27
Belgian Albums (Ultratop Flanders)	41
Belgian Albums (Ultratop Wallonia)	100
Dutch Albums (Album Top 100)	75
European Albums (Music & Media)	22
French Albums (SNEP)	46
German Albums (Offizielle Top 100)	34
New Zealand Albums (RMNZ)	10
UK Albums (OCC)	40

1999 year-end chart performance for Mezzanine
Chart (1999)	Position
UK Albums (OCC)	105

== Certifications and sales ==
Certifications and sales for Mezzanine
Region	Certification	Certified units/sales
Australia (ARIA)	Platinum	70,000^{^}
Austria (IFPI Austria)	Gold	25,000^{*}
Belgium (BRMA)	Platinum	50,000^{*}
Canada (Music Canada)	Gold	50,000^{^}
Denmark (IFPI Danmark)	2× Platinum	40,000^{‡}
France (SNEP)	2× Gold	200,000^{*}
Germany (BVMI)	Gold	250,000^{^}
Italy (FIMI) sales since 2009	Platinum	50,000^{‡}
Netherlands (NVPI)	Gold	50,000^{^}
New Zealand (RMNZ)	Platinum	15,000^{^}
Norway (IFPI Norway)	Gold	25,000^{*}
Spain (Promusicae)	Gold	50,000^{^}
Switzerland (IFPI Switzerland)	Platinum	50,000^{^}
United Kingdom (BPI)	2× Platinum	769,864
United States	—	560,000
Summaries
Europe (IFPI)	2× Platinum	2,000,000^{*}
^{*} Sales figures based on certification alone.^{^} Shipments figures based on certification alone.^{‡} Sales+streaming figures based on certification alone.

== See also ==
- List of UK Albums Chart number ones of the 1990s
- List of European number-one hits of 1998
- List of number-one albums in Australia during the 1990s
