= Butterfly Caught =

Song by trip-hop group Massive Attack

Single by Massive Attack

from the album 100th Window
- Released: 16 June 2003
- Length: 7:35 (album version); 4:23 (video version)
- Label: Virgin
- Songwriters: Robert "3D" Del Naja; Neil Davidge
- Producers: Robert "3D" Del Naja; Neil Davidge

Massive Attack singles chronology
"Special Cases" (2003)	"Butterfly Caught" (2003)	"Live with Me" (2006)

"Butterfly Caught" is a song on English trip hop collective Massive Attack's fourth full-length album, 100th Window. It was released as the second single from this album on 16 June 2003. The song was written by Neil Davidge and Robert Del Naja, the latter of whom performs vocals on the song.

A video for the song was made, featuring Del Naja in a series of body horror sequences where his body is transformed into that which resembles a Death's-head hawkmoth while a live moth flutters its wings in time to the lighting in the room, which themselves flash in time to the beat of the song. The video was directed by South African Daniel Levi.

== Track listing ==
CD (VSCDT1853)

1. "Butterfly Caught" (album version) – 7:35
2. "Butterfly Caught" (Paul Daley remix) – 6:01
3. "Butterfly Caught" (Octave One remix) – 7:21
4. "Butterfly Caught" (RJD2 remix) – 4:29
5. "Butterfly Caught" (Jagz Kooner remix) – 6:09 - additional vocals by Tara McDonald
6. "Butterfly Caught" (Version Point Five) – 5:49
7. "Butterfly Caught" (video) – 4:23

2×12" (VST1853)

1. "Butterfly Caught" (album version) – 7:33
2. "Butterfly Caught" (Paul Daley remix) – 5:58
3. "Butterfly Caught" (Octave One remix) – 7:17
4. "Butterfly Caught" (Paul Daley dub) – 4:54
5. "Butterfly Caught" (RJD2 remix) – 4:26
6. "Butterfly Caught" (RJD2 instrumental) – 4:23
7. "Butterfly Caught" (Jagz Kooner remix) – 6:06 - additional vocals by Tara McDonald
8. "Butterfly Caught" (Version Point Five) – 5:45
