= Unleashed (2005 film) =

2005 film by Louis Leterrier

- North American theatrical release poster
- Directed by: Louis Leterrier
- Written by: Luc Besson
- Produced by: Luc Besson; Jet Li; Steven Chasman
- Starring: Jet Li; Morgan Freeman; Bob Hoskins; Kerry Condon
- Cinematography: Pierre Morel
- Edited by: Nicolas Trembasiewicz
- Music by: Neil Davidge; Robert Del Naja
- Production companies: EuropaCorp; Danny the Dog Ltd.
- Distributed by: EuropaCorp Distribution (France); Universal Pictures (United Kingdom, Germany, Australia and New Zealand; through United International Pictures)
- Release dates: 2 February 2005 (France); 13 May 2005 (United States)
- Running time: 102 minutes
- Countries: France; United Kingdom
- Language: English
- Budget: $45 million
- Box office: $50.9 million

Unleashed (French: Danny the Dog) is a 2005 action film directed by Louis Leterrier and written by Luc Besson. It was produced by Besson and Jet Li, the latter of whom also starred in the lead role. The film co-stars Morgan Freeman, Bob Hoskins, and Kerry Condon. The action scenes were choreographed by Yuen Woo-ping, with the film's setting and shooting location in Glasgow, Scotland. The film follows Danny (Li), a man trained from childhood to be a brutal enforcer for a crime boss (Hoskins), who learns about the possibilities of a normal life. It received generally positive reviews, and many critics regard it as Li's best foreign film as a leading man.

== Plot ==
Bart, a vicious loan shark residing in Glasgow, uses his bodyguard, Danny, to attack non-complying debtors. Bart has raised and trained Danny to be an attack dog and uses a metal collar around Danny's neck to control him. Because Danny was raised to be overly docile and unobservant once the collar is on, he barely knows how to live as a socialized person, and the collar trick begins to fail due to its inherent limitations.

A crime boss invites Bart to an underground fighting ring hosting death matches, offering him hefty prize money in exchange for Danny surviving monthly fights. After Danny easily wins the first fight, however, Bart gets into a mishap with another mobster and is left for dead after a shooting. Danny survives and takes refuge in an antiques warehouse, where he collapses. Sam, a blind piano tuner, takes him to his home. Together with his stepdaughter Victoria, Sam nurses Danny back to health. Danny slowly learns to be civilized and abandons his violent nature under their kindly care, even after Victoria removes his collar. He also curiously develops an interest in music and begins using scattered memories to remember his past, particularly his mother.

Weeks later, Sam informs Danny about moving back to New York, where he and Victoria are originally from. He invites Danny, telling him they think of him as family, who happily accepts. However, while out shopping alone, Danny runs into Bart's right-hand man Lefty, who reveals Bart survived. Lefty takes Danny back to Bart; Danny asks Bart if he knew Danny's mother. Bart denies knowing her and takes him back to the underground ring for their next fight. Initially overwhelmed by his four opponents, Danny eventually defeats them, but refuses to kill. Livid, Bart drags Danny back to their compound and throws him into his cell. However, Danny sneaks out and looks through Bart's old photographs, finding one of a person who looks like Danny's mother. Bart insists that his mother was a prostitute who disappeared after abandoning her son.

Danny escapes the next morning and goes back to Sam and Victoria, telling them where he was and what he has learned. With the two's help, Danny regains his childhood memories: his mother was a music student in Glasgow struggling financially, so she offered herself to Bart for funds, while hiding a young Danny in the closet. It ended when Bart shot her to death when she finally defied him, and Bart has raised Danny ever since.

Bart and a group of thugs arrive at Sam's apartment complex to capture Danny. Danny hides Sam and Victoria in their closet and goes out to fight them off. Danny confronts Bart, who implores Danny to abandon his new life and come back to his old one. Danny refuses and furiously beats Bart. Sam and Victoria burst out and beg Danny not to kill; however, a defeated Bart orders Danny otherwise, and taunts him. Sam smashes a flowerpot on Bart's head, knocking him unconscious. Sam, Danny, and Victoria embrace.

Sometime later, Danny is with Sam at a piano recital at Carnegie Hall, where Victoria begins playing. She performs the same song from Danny’s childhood, prompting Danny to smile.

== Cast ==
- Jet Li as Danny / Danny "The Dog"
- Morgan Freeman as Sam
- Bob Hoskins as Bart
- Kerry Condon as Victoria
- Vincent Regan as Raffles
- Dylan Brown as "Lefty"
- Tamer Hassan as Georgie
- Michael Jenn as Wyeth
- Jean-François Lénogue as Raffles Thug
- Scott Adkins as Swimming Pool Fighter
- Silvio Simac as Swimming Pool Fighter (uncredited)
- Mike Ian Lambert as The Stranger
- Kazu Patrick Tang as Bart's Thug

== Release ==
Unleashed was first distributed in France as Danny the Dog on February 2, 2005.

=== Critical reception ===
Unleashed received generally positive reviews. The film has a rating of 66% on Rotten Tomatoes based on 133 reviews with an average score of 6.2/10. The critical consensus states: "Jet Li gets to emote in some emotionally awkward scenes, but the gritty fight sequences come through in what is Li's best English language film." The film also has a score of 58 out of 100 on Metacritic based on 31 reviews.

Roger Ebert of the Chicago Sun Times gave the film 3 out of 4 stars, stating "The film is ingenious in its construction. It has all the martial arts action any Jet Li fan could possibly desire." In 2014, Time Out polled several film critics, directors, actors and stunt actors to list their top action films, and Unleashed was listed at 68th place on this list.

=== Box office ===
In North America, Unleashed was released by Rogue Pictures (which was a division of Focus Features). In its opening weekend in North America, the film grossed $10,900,901 which placed it third. It showed on 1,957 theaters for an average $5,570 per screen. The film grossed $24.5 million in North America and a further $26.3 million worldwide for a total of 50.9 million. This box office result surpassed Rogue's expectations of $18 million gross at the North America box office.

== Soundtrack ==
Danny the Dog

Soundtrack album by Massive Attack
- Released: October 11, 2004
- Genre: Trip hop
- Length: 52:39
- Labels: Virgin; EMI Records
- Producers: Neil Davidge; Robert Del Naja; The RZA

Massive Attack chronology
100th Window (2003)	Danny the Dog (2004)	Collected (2006)

Professional ratings
Review scores
Source	Rating
Allmusic	2.5/5 stars

The soundtrack was created by Massive Attack. It was released under the name Danny the Dog, in 2004 from Virgin/EMI Records. In 2005, Virgin Records re-released the soundtrack under the title Unleashed, with two bonus tracks produced by the RZA. Neither version features the song "Aftersun", featuring vocals by Dot Allison, that appears in the end credits of the film. The classical piano solo played in several scenes of the film is Mozart's Piano Sonata No.11 "Andante grazioso" while the song "Two Rocks and a Cup of Water" was played in one of the trailers to I Am Legend.

1. "Opening Title" – 1:10
2. "Atta' Boy" – 1:29
3. "P Is for Piano" – 1:57
4. "Simple Rules" – 1:20
5. "Polaroid Girl" – 2:59
6. "Sam" – 3:08
7. "One Thought at a Time" – 4:23
8. "Confused Images" – 1:59
9. "Red Light Means Go" – 2:04
10. "Collar Stays On" – 1:51
11. "You've Never Had a Dream" – 2:46
12. "Right Way to Hold a Spoon" – 3:19
13. "Everybody's Got a Family" – 1:29
14. "Two Rocks and a Cup of Water" – 2:32
15. "Sweet Is Good" – 1:33
16. "Montage" – 1:54
17. "Everything About You Is New" – 2:25
18. "The Dog Obeys" – 2:19
19. "Danny the Dog" – 5:53
20. "I Am Home" – 4:14
21. "The Academy" – 1:45

Bonus tracks

In 2005 Virgin released a new version of the album with two bonus tracks.

22. "Baby Boy" – 3:28 (Thea Van Seijen)
23. "Unleash Me" – 2:36 (The RZA feat. Prodigal Sunn & Christbearer of Northstar)

== See also ==
- Jet Li filmography
