= Angelo Bruschini =

English rock guitarist (1960/1961–2023)

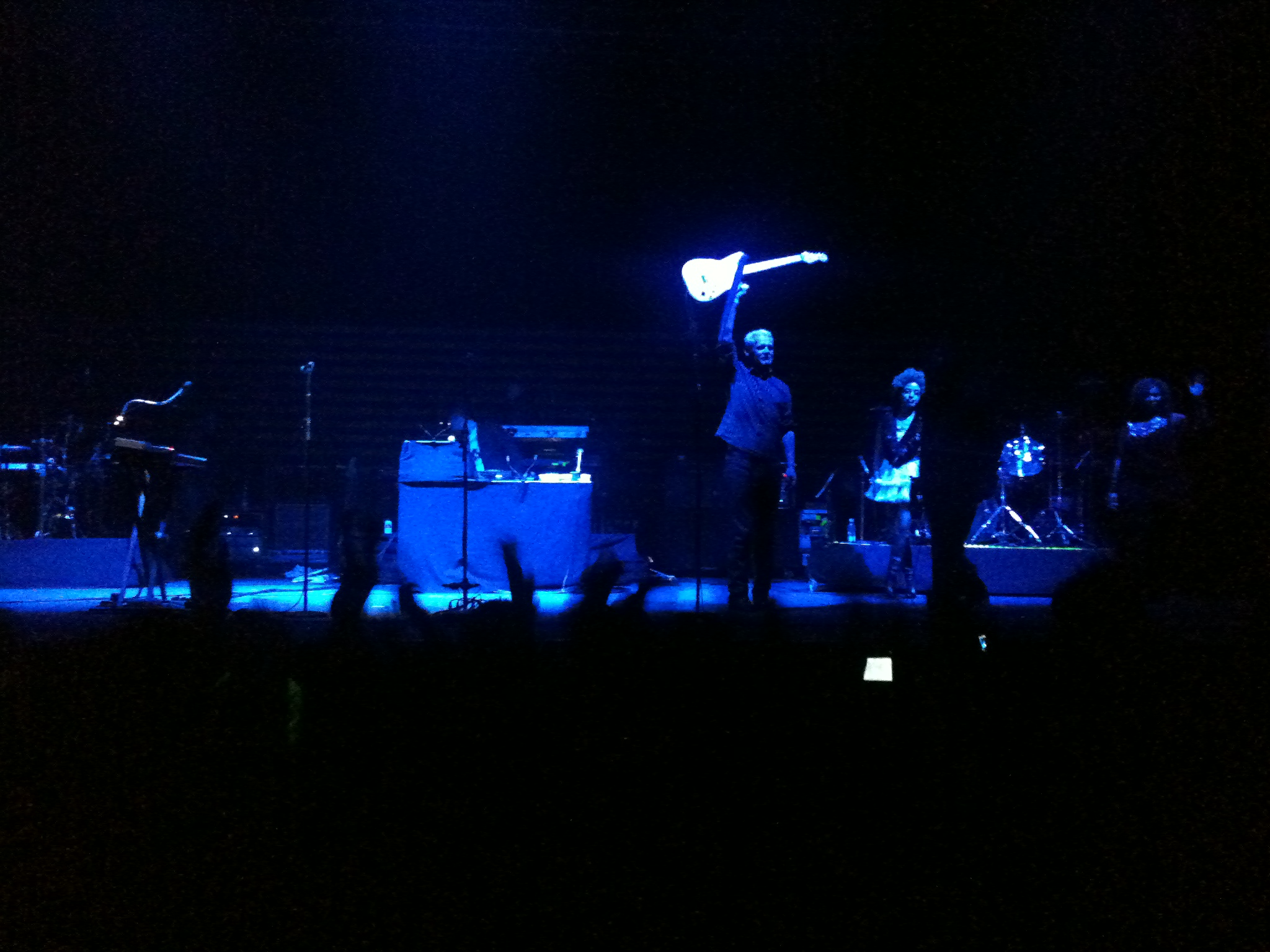
Bruschini with Massive Attack in 2010

Angelo Bruschini (1960/1961 – 23 October 2023) was an English guitarist from Bristol who contributed to the region's trip hop explosion in the 1990s and 2000s.

== Career ==
He was a member of The Numbers, Rimshots, The Blue Aeroplanes, and both toured and recorded with Massive Attack, appearing on their albums Mezzanine (1998) and 100th Window (2003). He produced Strangelove's eponymous album in 1997. He also played guitar on Jane Taylor's single "Blowing This Candle Out" in 2003.

Bruschini died of lung cancer on 23 October 2023, at the age of 62.
