= Daddy G =

British musician (born 1959)

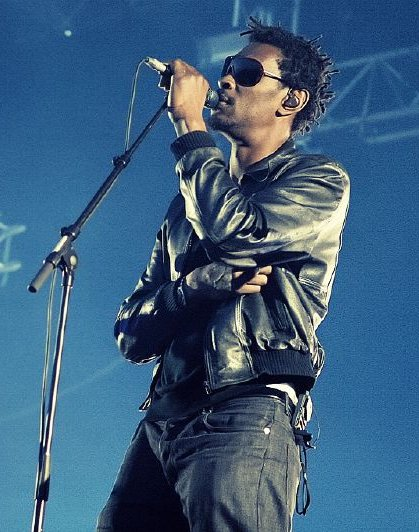
- Daddy G at the Eurockéennes 2008

Background information
- Also known as: Grantley Marshall
- Born: 18 December 1959 (age 66)
- Origin: Bristol, England
- Genres: Trip hop; electronic
- Years active: 1983–present

Grantley Evan Marshall (born 18 December 1959), also known by the stage name Daddy G, is a British DJ and a founding member of the band Massive Attack.

== Biography ==
Born in Bristol to Barbadian parents, Marshall joined the Bristol music scene as a member of the sound system the Wild Bunch in the 1980s. The sound system included the other three founding members of Massive Attack, Robert del Naja, Tricky and Andrew Vowles. At the time, he was one of the youngest DJs in the city. In 1986, The Wild Bunch disbanded. Del Naja, Vowles, and Marshall then formed the trip hop group Massive Attack in 1988, which are considered to have pioneered the Bristol Sound along with Portishead and Tricky.

Between 2001 and 2005, Marshall was mainly absent from Massive Attack, with 100th Window being the only album he did not have major input on. Reuniting (minus Vowles) for Heligoland and more recent projects, the group divided the production work between Marshall and Del Naja, who each worked on separate songs in their own studios, choosing their own collaborators.

== Other work ==
Marshall mixed a CD for the DJ-Kicks mix series in 2004.
