= Andrew Vowles =

British musician

- Also known as: Mushroom
- Born: Andrew Lee Isaac Vowles; Bristol, England
- Genres: Trip hop; electronic
- Instruments: Drums; percussion; turntables; keyboards
- Years active: 1983–1998; 2023–present
- Formerly of: Massive Attack; The Wild Bunch

Andrew Lee Isaac Vowles, also known as Mushroom, is an English musician, known for being a founding member of the trip hop/abstract art collective Massive Attack, along with Robert Del Naja (3D), Adrian Thaws (Tricky) and Grantley Marshall (Daddy G).

== Early years ==
Vowles was born in Bristol. Prior to Massive Attack, Vowles, along with Robert Del Naja, Grant Marshall, Nellee Hooper, Adrian Thaws and others were the Wild Bunch crew, named after the western film of the same name by Sam Peckinpah. Several members of the Wild Bunch formed Massive Attack.

Vowles's nickname "Mushroom" comes from the arcade game Centipede. The game was installed at Special K's Cafe, a popular hang-out spot in the mid-1980s for Vowles and his Wild Bunch peers.

== Career ==
Vowles remained a member of Massive Attack until shortly after the release of their third full-length album, Mezzanine, in 1998. Interviews with band members have pointed to differences of opinion in the creative direction the band should go.

Apart from his contributions to Massive Attack, Vowles also appears as a DJ and co-producer on Raw Like Sushi, Neneh Cherry's 1989 debut album.
