= Robert Del Naja =

English musician and graffiti artist (born 1965)

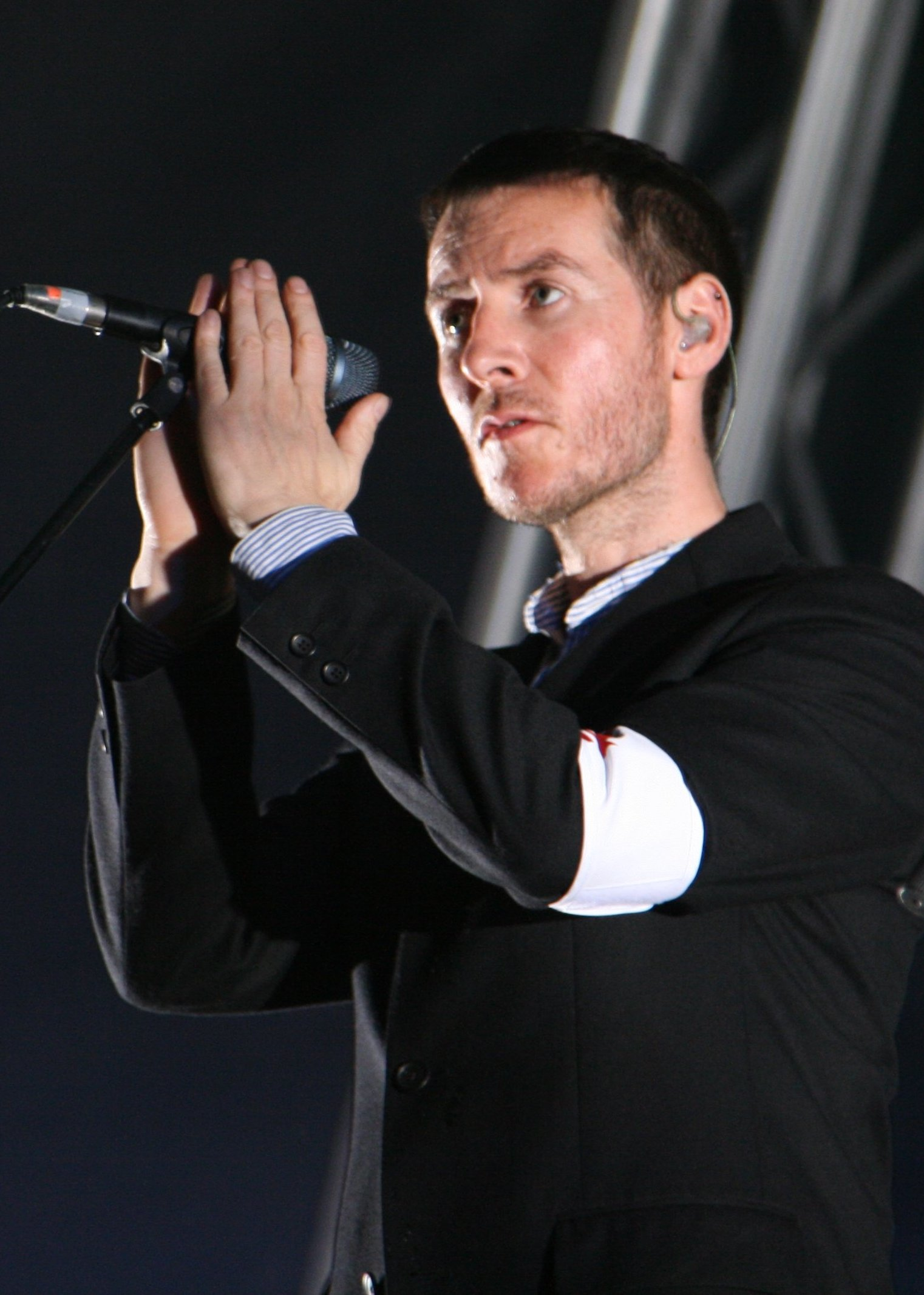
- Del Naja in 2007

Background information
- Also known as: 3D, Delge
- Born: 21 January 1965 (age 61)
- Origin: Bristol, England
- Genre: Trip hop
- Occupations: Musician; singer-songwriter; graffiti artist
- Instruments: Vocals; keyboards; sampler; guitar
- Years active: 1984–present
- Member of: Massive Attack
- Formerly of: The Wild Bunch

Robert Del Naja (/dɛl ˈnaɪə/; born 21 January 1965), also known as 3D, is an English singer-songwriter and artist. He emerged as a graffiti artist and member of the Bristol collective the Wild Bunch, and later as a founding member and sole consistent member of the band Massive Attack, with which he is still active. In 2009, he received the British Academy's Ivor Novello Award for Outstanding Contribution to British Music.

== Music ==
Del Naja started rapping with the Wild Bunch in Bristol in the mid-1980s. He is one of the founding members of Bristol trip hop collective Massive Attack, with Daddy G (Grant Marshall), Tricky (Adrian Thaws) and Andrew Vowles, as a music producer and the only vocalist to feature on all their albums and EPs. The band received critical acclaim with their first album Blue Lines, released in 1991.

From 1997 to 1998, Del Naja was the band's main producer in the recording sessions that made Mezzanine, Massive Attack's most commercially successful album, selling nearly 4 million copies, with Neil Davidge as a sound engineer.

In addition to his work with Massive Attack, he provided vocals to "Invasion" on Unkle's album Never, Never, Land, and "Twilight" on War Stories.

Del Naja has co-written a number of film scores and tracks for films with Neil Davidge and with Euan Dickinson. "Herculaneum", the title track for Italian director Matteo Garrone's 2008 award-winning film Gomorrah, based on the book by Roberto Saviano about organised crime in Naples, received the prize for best song at the David Di Donatello Awards.

In December 2012, Del Naja released the first single of his new project called the Battle Box, which fuses music, art and discourse across one-off live events, exhibitions and exclusive vinyl releases. He counted with the collaboration of artists such as Guy Garvey, Noel Gallagher, Jupiter Bokondji and the Higgins Waterproof Black Magic Band.

In December 2014, Del Naja donated ten unreleased music tracks to the Game Jam site Ludum Dare, for a game event taking place in December. The songs will be used by the site developers to make soundtracks for the games. This new music material is available for free download.

In February 2015, Del Naja and Radiohead frontman Thom Yorke released the soundtrack for the documentary The UK Gold. The songs are available for free download.

In 2015 he collaborated with Jean-Michel Jarre on the Electronica 1: The Time Machine album, resulting in the track "Watching You".

== Art work ==
Del Naja was a graffiti artist before becoming a producer and vocalist, and was featured in the 1987 book Spraycan Art by Henry Chalfant and James Prigoff and in the 1988 film Bombin', directed by Dick Fontaine, alongside fellow artist and future drum and bass pioneer Goldie.

He is regarded as one of those who brought hip hop and graffiti culture from the United States to Bristol in the early 1980s. He has previously been the subject of speculation that he is anonymous artist Banksy. In several interviews, Banksy has cited Del Naja as his inspiration for starting to do graffiti himself. The young punk Del Naja first began doing graffiti with stencils, inspired by stencils used by the punk bands Crass and The Clash. In 1987, he returned to stencils despite hostility from the style writing graffiti scene. A young Banksy saw these stencils in Bristol. Later, Banksy regularly encouraged Del Naja not to give up his art completely.

Del Naja's work has been featured on all of Massive Attack's record sleeves.

Since 2003, Del Naja has co-designed all of Massive Attack's lighting shows with UVA; the shows have been overtly political, dealing with local and international issues.

Del Naja and Massive Attack's producer Neil Davidge collaborated with United Visual Artists on the large scale installation Volume at London's V&A museum in 2006. It consists of a field of 48 luminous, sound-emitting columns that respond to movement. Visitors weave a path through the sculpture, creating their own unique journey in light and music.

Del Naja took part in a group show in 2007 called Warpaint at the Lazarides Gallery in London, featuring his art from the Unkle album War Stories. He created an exhibition of flags at Massive Attack's Meltdown Festival on London's Southbank Centre in 2008. The installation was called "Favoured Nations". In the exhibition, alternative flags of the British Commonwealth were recoloured in the anarchist red and black and hung from the ceiling of the Royal Festival Hall main floor.

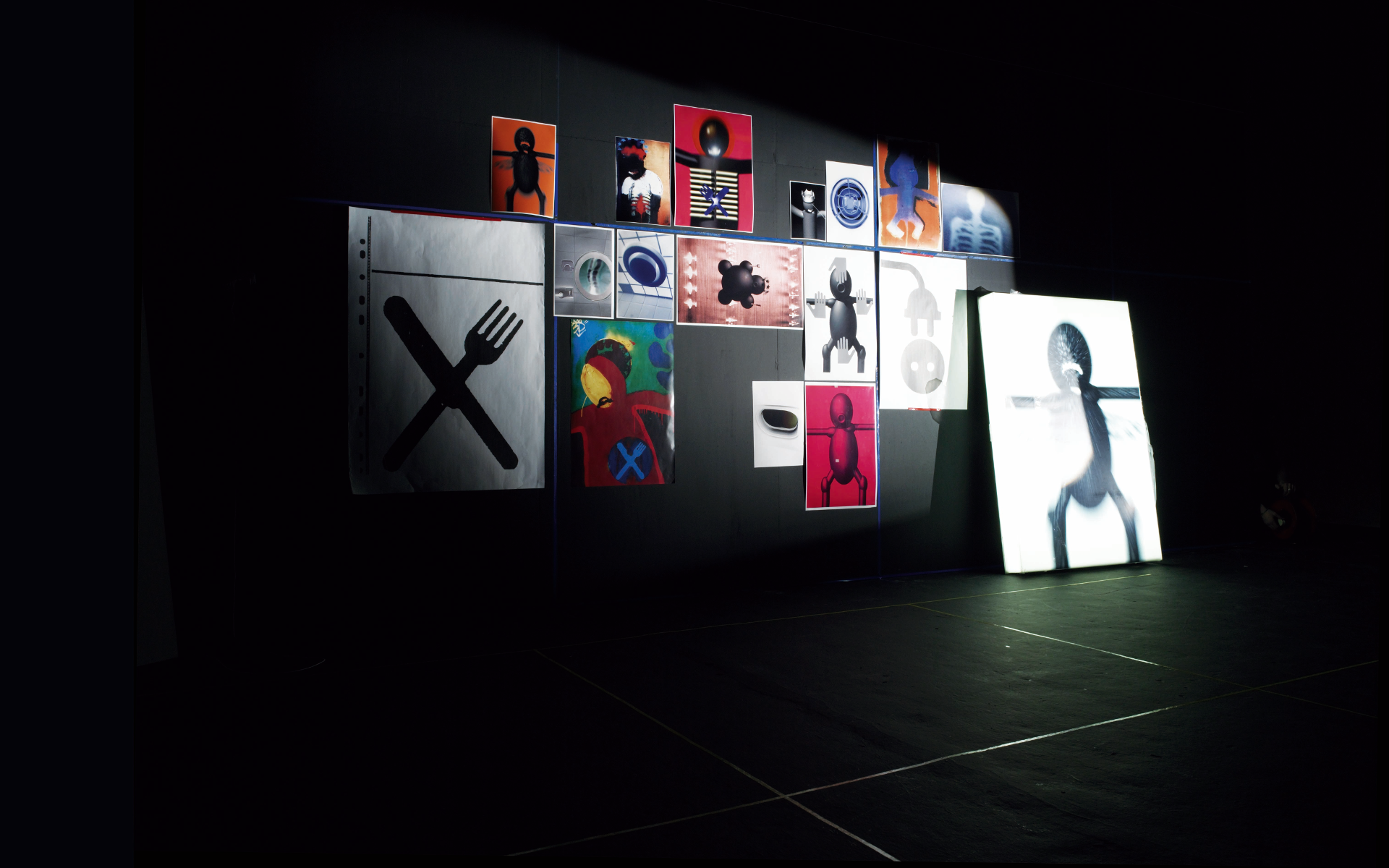
Robert Del Naja's art

In a 2010 interview, Del Naja said "Painting is difficult for me because I'm colour blind. Back in the day, I had to label my spray cans with what colour they were because I couldn't tell. It's like the emperor's new clothes: [people] telling me it's great, and me pretending that's what I intended."

Del Naja had his largest solo art show at the Lazarides gallery in central London from 24 May to 22 June 2013. The show's content spanned a period of over twenty years and featured many of the art pieces that Del Naja created for Massive Attack. Each piece, reinterpreted especially for the exhibition, was hand-printed and finished. The show featured three one-off 'digital infinity mirrors' two of which contained phrases supplied by Reprieve extracted from drone pilot dialogues. Del Naja and Grant DJ'd at the opening night on 23 May.

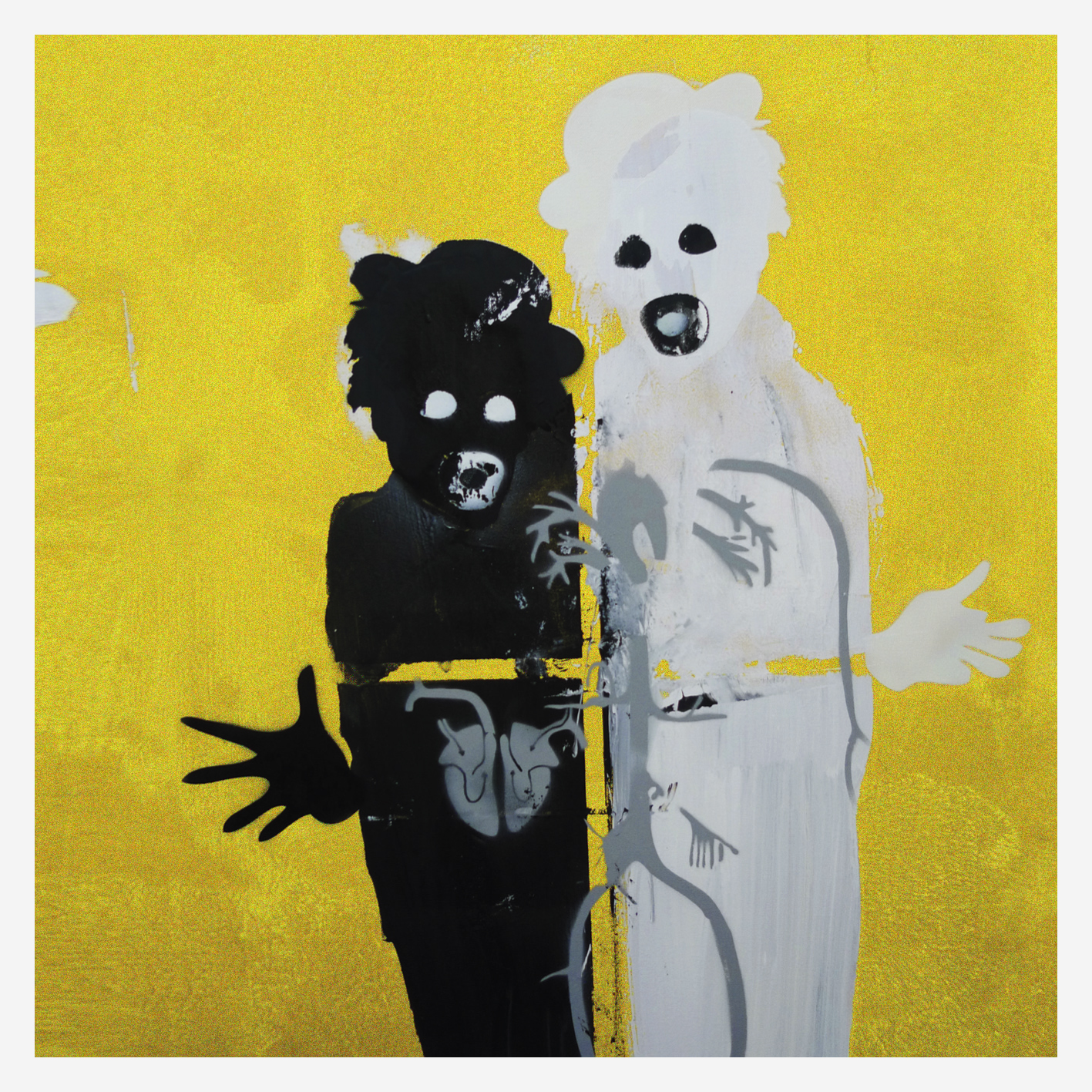
Del Naja cover art 2009

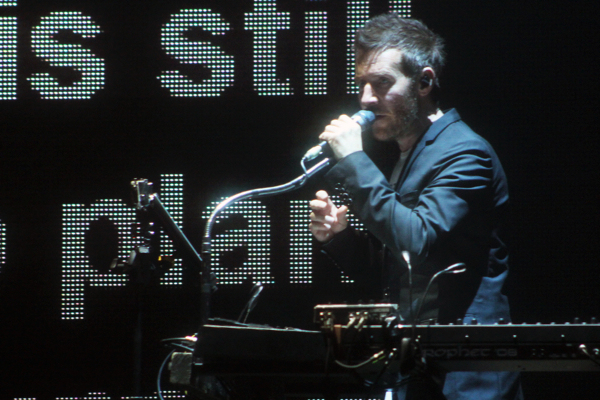
Del Naja performing in Massive Attack V Adam Curtis 2013

A multi-medium show conceived and designed by Del Naja and filmmaker Adam Curtis – in collaboration with United Visual Artists (UVA) – premiered in Manchester in July 2013. The show featured a Curtis film, unofficially titled The Plan, which was projected onto a huge screen surrounding the audience. The lighting and LED elements that surrounded the film and players were designed by Del Naja and UVA. Del Naja orchestrated the show's soundtrack, and the music later became part of the score for Curtis' BBC production entitled HyperNormalisation in 2016.

In 2015, Del Naja published a book of photographs, art, and stories that spanned his entire career titled 3D and the Art of Massive Attack.

During the COVID lockdown, on 19 May 2020 Del Naja launched his Fire Sale website store, selling Protection, a limited-edition print, in aid of the Bristol Food Union. The print raised more than £100,000 for the charity.

In July 2020, Massive Attack released a political audiovisual EP called Eutopia: The 3x track fusion was created across five cities during the Covid-19 global lockdown period. The project was co-written and produced by 3D and Mark Donne, featuring strong arguments for global system change from UN Paris Climate Agreement author Christiana Figueres, founder of the universal basic income principle professor Guy Standing and inventor of the US wealth tax policy Professor Gabriel Zucman.

In June 2021, Del Naja was presented with a Royal College of Art honorary doctorate - nominated and presented by Sir Jony Ive.

In March 2022, he started again selling off artwork to help victims of the 2022 Russian invasion of Ukraine, with proceeds to go to the Disasters Emergency Committee's humanitarian appeal.

== Technology ==
In 2016, Massive Attack released their EP Ritual Spirit as part of a procedural music app called Fantom (with a new version developed in 2019). The "sensory remixer" lets people create unique versions of tracks, with the app taking into account variables like movement, time of day or night, location and what a user's phone camera can see. An Apple Watch version of the app that varies the song's rhythm and harmony based on heartbeat was developed, while live social media notifications sent via a Twitter feed triggered alternative real time mix events.

In 2019, Del Naja and Adam Curtis teamed up for a second time on a live show based on the band's Mezzanine album.

== Musical scene and artistic peers ==
Del Naja's music has been associated with the Bristol sound. He said of the Bristol Scene: "We all grew up listening to punk music and funk stuff and those attitudes sort of snuck into our music. That sort of brought people from different circles together and maybe it wasn't as 'cultural melting pot' as it all sounds but because Bristol is quite a small place, it becomes a lot more focused then."

== Activism and politics ==
Del Naja has been critical of the government policies of the United Kingdom. He was strongly opposed to the 2003 invasion of Iraq, and with fellow musician Damon Albarn personally paid for full-page adverts in the NME magazine. On the eve of the invasion of Iraq, they tried to organise a group of prominent musicians into an anti-war campaign, only according to Del Naja to be greeted with silence bordering on hostility.

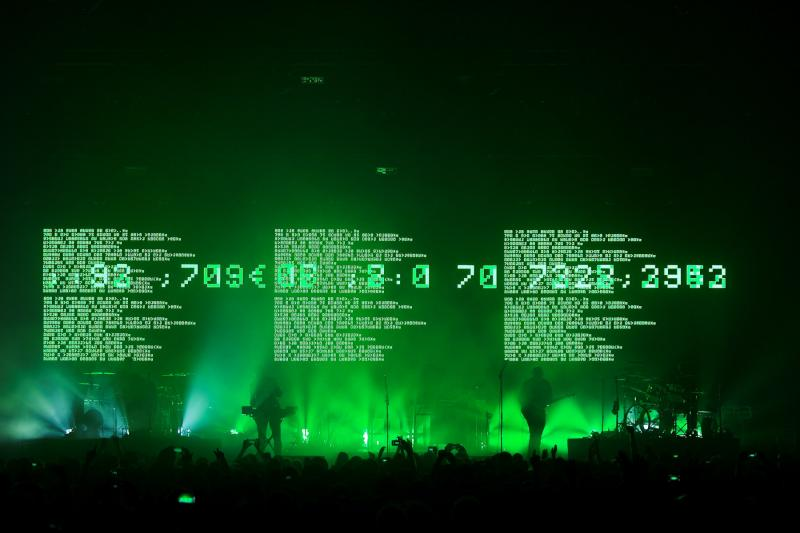
UVA/Del Naja LED stage art 2015

Massive Attack have previously played two shows in Israel, but have declined recent offers. They have described this "not an action of aggression towards the Israeli people" but "towards the [Israeli] government and its policies", arguing that "the Palestinians [in Gaza and the West Bank] have no access to the same fundamental benefits that the Israelis do."

In 2005, Del Naja organised and performed at a charity concert in Bristol for Tsunami Relief with Adrian Utley and Geoff Barrow of Portishead. The two-night event featured Massive Attack, Portishead, Robert Plant, The Coral and Damon Albarn. Del Naja and Marshall performed three shows in 2007 in support of Hoping, an organisation that helps raise money, support projects for Palestinian youth in refugee camps in the Gaza strip and the West Bank, Lebanon and Syria.

Del Naja and Thom Yorke of Radiohead held a Christmas party at an occupied UBS bank in London in December 2011, in recognition and support for the international Occupy movement.

Having previously boycotted playing at Bristol's Colston Hall due to its connection with the city's historic slave trade, in October 2012, Del Naja strongly criticised Bristol Mayor candidate George Ferguson because of his membership of a local organisation the Society of Merchant Venturers. The organisation dates back to the 16th century and had many connections with the Bristol slave trade, continuing to this day as an elitist private organisation, open to very few by invitation only. In November 2012, Del Naja then took a surprising stance to reverse his position and endorse Ferguson. Del Naja was cited by local media as stating that the other candidates had only party political agendas at heart and a newly elected mayor needed more imagination to help implement creative projects for Bristol.

In July 2014, Del Naja and Grant Marshall visited the Bourj el-Barajneh refugee camp in Lebanon to meet with Palestinian volunteers at an educational centre. The band's profit from the show in Byblos was donated to the centre.

In 2016, Del Naja worked with photographer Giles Duley to show their support for refugees; Massive Attack used his photographs from different sites of the crisis for their new show.

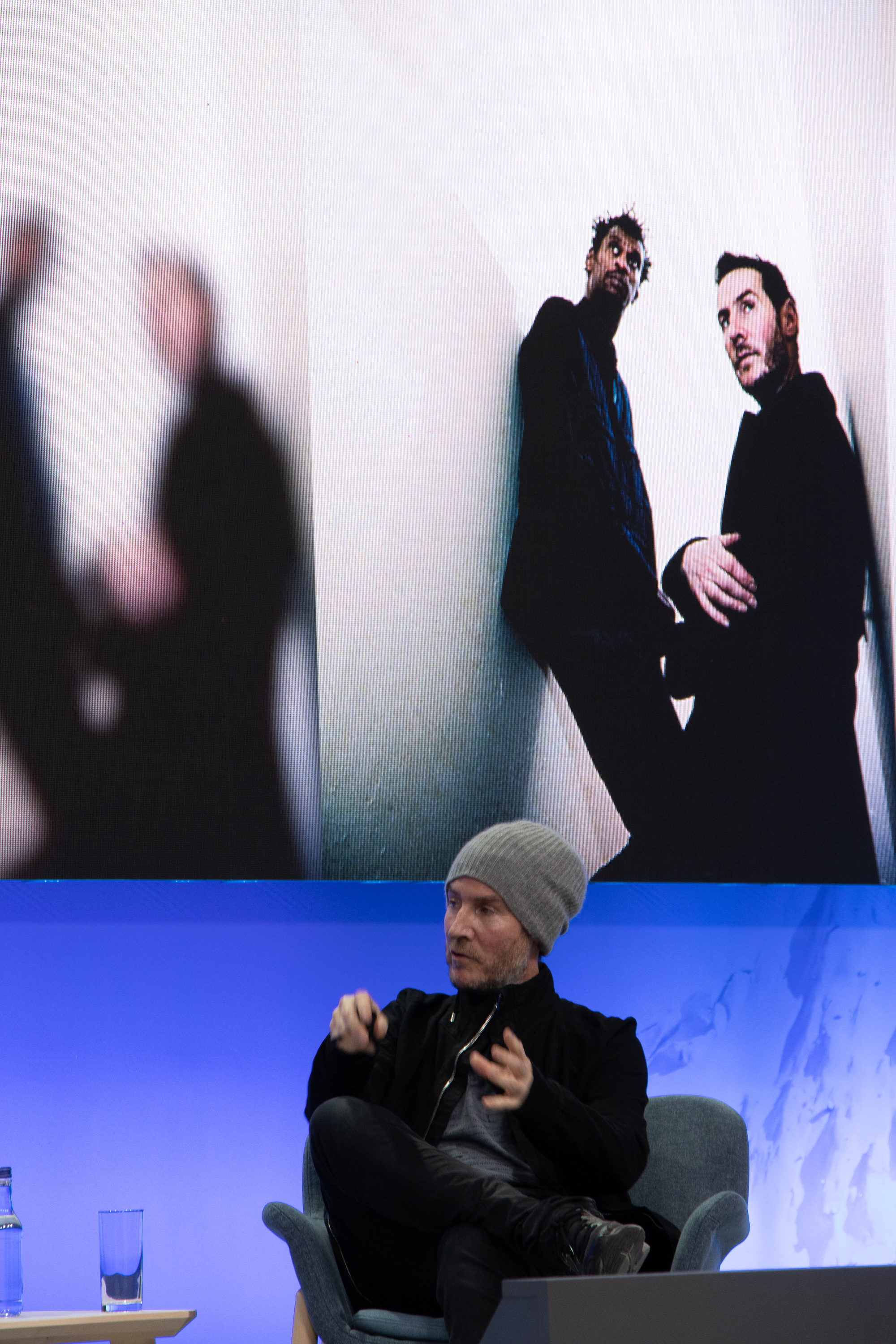
Robert del Naja at the COP26 Climate Change Summit in Glasgow in 2021

From 2018, Del Naja has been supporting the climate activists of the Extinction Rebellion group, which have conducted protests in London since October 2018. In April, he played a DJ set for the Extinction Rebellion protesters in Marble Arch, London.

In July and October 2019, the group protested in 60 other cities worldwide and Del Naja provided a portable radio network using speakers in backpacks with receivers and transmitters for the campaigners in London. Massive Attack concluded their Mezzanine XXI tour of the US in October by organising a benefit concert at Webster Hall in NYC to help pay protestors' legal fees.

In November 2019, along with various other public figures, Massive Attack signed a letter supporting Labour Party leader Jeremy Corbyn describing him as "a beacon of hope in the struggle against emergent far-right nationalism, xenophobia and racism in much of the democratic world" and endorsed him in the 2019 UK general election.

On 28 November 2019, Del Naja announced that Massive Attack partnered with a research centre based at the University of Manchester to explore the music industry's climate impact. He wrote in a column in The Guardian: "The commissioning of the renowned Tyndall Centre for Climate Change Research to map the full carbon footprint of typical tour cycles, and to look specifically at the three key areas where CO_{2} emissions in our sector are generated".

In May 2020, during the Covid-19 pandemic, Del Naja called for more government support to be given to those in food poverty after a print fundraising sale in his home town of Bristol raised more than £100,000 to help feed frontline workers and at-risk groups.

During the spring 2020, Del Naja also worked on a Massive Attack political audiovisual EP called Eutopia, consisting of 3 track fusion created across 5 cities during the Covid-19 global lockdown period, with documentary filmmaker Mark Donne, AI art pioneer Mario Klingemann and vocal collaborations with Algiers, Young Fathers and poet Saul Williams. The conceptual project, co-written and produced by Del Naja and Donne, features strong arguments for global system change from UN Paris Climate Agreement author Christiana Figueres, founder of the universal basic income principle professor Guy Standing and inventor of the US wealth tax policy Professor Gabriel Zucman. Each video ends with a quote from Thomas More's Utopia.

Del Naja was among the over 50 people arrested during a protest in support to Palestine and Palestine Action outside the Labour Party’s annual conference in Liverpool on September 27, 2026. In October 2026, he signed an open letter backing author Sally Rooney, whose books were withdrawn from sale in the United Kingdom due to her support for Palestine Action, and calling the withdrawal an "affront to basic principles of free speech and expression".

== Legal troubles ==
Del Naja was arrested and cautioned twice in Bristol during the 1980s for painting graffiti and ordered to do community service.

In 2003, he was arrested on allegations involving child pornography as part of Operation Ore, which were reported widely in the media. Del Naja was later eliminated as a suspect, although he was charged with ecstasy possession and was unable to get a U.S. visa for a while. The arrest affected the beginning of the 100th Window tour schedule. It was later reported that Del Naja was falsely implicated due to a credit card number linked to him being found in a database used during preliminary Operation Ore investigations, much of which consisted of stolen card details.

On 11 April 2026, Del Naja was arrested in London for attending a protest in support of the direct action network, Palestine Action. He was pictured carrying a sign stating "I oppose genocide, I support Palestine Action", which is illegal in the United Kingdom under the Terrorism Act 2000.

== Personal life ==
Del Naja was brought up in Bristol. His father was from Naples, Italy, and as a result he is a supporter of the S.S.C. Napoli football team, as well as Bristol City.

Del Naja attended state school in Filton, Bristol, but did not complete his A-levels.

== Music for film ==
With Massive Attack

- 1995: Batman Forever – "The Hunter Gets Captured by the Game" with Tracey Thorn

With Liam Howlett

- 1999: The Uranus Experiment

Robert Del Naja with Neil Davidge (as 1.6)

- 1997: Welcome to Sarajevo – "Wire" / End-titles
- 1997: The Jackal – "Superpredators" (version) (opening titles, end credits)
- 2001: Moulin Rouge! – "Nature Boy" with David Bowie (end credits)
- 2002: Blade 2 – "I Against I" with Mos Def
- 2004: Bullet Boy – score and end titles song
- 2005: Danny the Dog – score
- 2007: Battle in Seattle – score
- 2007: In Prison My Whole Life – score and end title song "Calling Mumia" with Snoop Dogg
- 2008: Trouble the Water – score

Robert Del Naja with Euan Dickinson

- 2008: Gomorrah (Matteo Garrone) – Herculaneum (winner of best song at the David Di Donatello)
- 2010: Women Are Heroes (JR) – 2011 Dias De Gracia (Everardo Valerio Gout) Summertime/with Scarlett Johansson
- 2013: The UK Gold (Mark Donne) with Thom Yorke
- 2015: The Standing March (JR/Darren Aronofsky)
- 2016: La Fête Est Finie, for the COP 21 (Mark Donne)
- 2016: Hypernormalisation (Adam Curtis)

With The Insects

1. 2009 44-Inch Chest – full score with Angelo Badalamenti

Robert Del Naja with Saul Williams

- 2020: Akilla's Escape

== See also ==
- Bristol underground scene
