= Neneh Cherry discography =

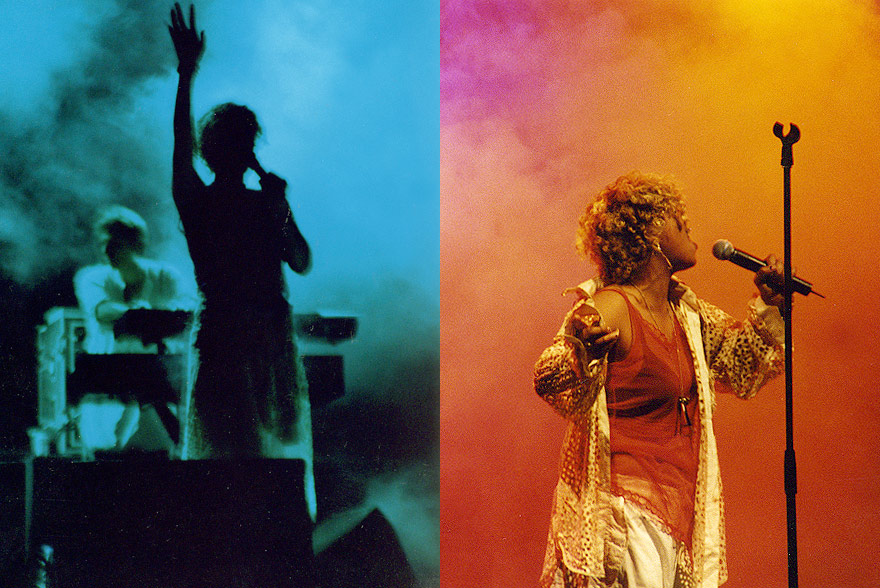
- Neneh Cherry performing live at the Arena in Vienna, Austria during the Man Tour (1996).
- Studio albums: 6
- Live albums: 1
- Singles: 20
- Video albums: 1
- Remix albums: 2

The following is a comprehensive list of music records released by Swedish singer Neneh Cherry.

== Albums ==
=== Studio albums ===
Title	Album details	Peak chart positions										Certifications
Title	Album details	SWE	AUS	AUT	FRA	GER	NL	NZ	SWI	UK	US	Certifications
Raw Like Sushi	Release date: 5 June 1989; Label: Virgin (#91252); Formats: LP, CD, CS	3	30	7	—	10	11	9	6	2	40	GLF: Gold; BPI: Platinum; MC: Gold; NVPI: Gold; IFPI SWI: Gold
Homebrew	Release date: 26 October 1992; Label: Virgin (#86516); Formats: LP, CD, CS	29	49	—	—	—	48	43	16	27	—	
Man	Release date: 2 September 1996; Label: Virgin (#842777); Formats: LP, CD, CS	22	10	5	4	20	22	23	5	16	—	BPI: Silver; IFPI SWI: Gold
Blank Project	Release date: 25 February 2014; Label: Smalltown Supersound; Formats: CD, LP, download	40	—	38	—	39	71	—	28	41	—	
Broken Politics	Release date: 19 October 2018; Record label: Smalltown Supersound; Formats: CD, LP, download	—	—	46	—	55	—	—	52	76	—	
The Versions	Release date: 10 June 2022; Label: EMI, Universal Music; Formats: CD, LP, download	—	—	—	—	—	—	—	—	—	—	
"—" denotes an album that did not chart or was not released in that region.

=== Remix albums ===
Title	Album details	Notes
Remixes (as Neneh Chérie)	Release date: 1997; Label: Virgin (#8942572); Formats: 2LP, CD	Remix collection with seven remixes - "Kootchi (Air Remix)", "Beastiality (Christophe Monier Remix)", "Carry Me (Emmanuel Top Remix)", "Everything (Sulee B Wax Remix)", "Feel It (Sub-Vision Remix)", "Feel It (Doctor L. Remix)" and "Woman (La Funk Mob Remix)".
with CirKus:
Laylower	Release date: 2007; Label: Tent Music (#TENT 006); Formats: 2CD	Double album - the first CD contains original Laylow album (2006), while the second re-recorded versions of the same songs, credited as "Laylower Mixes", with additional drums, bass, guitars, keyboards and vocals (influenced by live performances).

=== Live albums ===
Title	Album details	Notes
In Concert 730	Release date: 1997; Record label: BBC (#IC730); Formats: CD	Promotional release, featuring nine live tracks recorded live at Glastonbury Festival 1997: "Manchild", "Together Now", "I've Got You Under My Skin", "Crack Baby", "Somedays", "Buffalo Stance", "Woman", "7 Seconds" (feat. Charlie Casey) and "Germ Free Adolescents".

== Singles ==
=== As lead artist ===
Year	Title	Peak chart positions										Album
Year	Title	SWE	AUS	FRA	GER	IRE	NL	NZ	SWI	UK		Album
Year	Title	SWE	AUS	FRA	GER	IRE	NL	NZ	SWI	UK	US	Album
1988	"Buffalo Stance"	1	21	—	2	7	1	14	2	3	3	Raw Like Sushi
1989	"Manchild"	7	58	41	2	12	3	4	4	5	—	Raw Like Sushi
1989	"Kisses on the Wind"	—	63	—	23	13	14	8	9	20	8	Raw Like Sushi
1989	"Heart" (US and Australia only)	—	91	—	—	—	—	—	—	—	73	Raw Like Sushi
1989	"Inna City Mamma" (Europe and New Zealand only)	—	—	—	—	12	6	15	17	31	—	Raw Like Sushi
1990	"I've Got You Under My Skin"	16	61	—	23	—	14	32	25	25	—	Red Hot + Blue
1992	"Money Love"	17	85	—	—	—	27	31	—	23	—	Homebrew
1992	"Move with Me" (Germany only)	—	—	—	—	—	—	—	—	—	—	Homebrew
1993	"Buddy X"	—	102	—	—	—	23	—	—	35	43	Homebrew
1995	"Trouble Man" (promotional only single)	—	—	—	—	—	—	—	—	—	—	Man
1996	"Woman"	20	17	14	52	29	22	35	12	9	—	Man
1996	"Kootchi" (Europe only)	—	—	—	—	—	—	—	—	38	—	Man
1997	"Feel It"	—	148	—	—	—	—	—	—	68	—	Man
1999	"Buddy X 99" (with Dreem Teem) (Europe only)	—	—	—	—	—	—	—	—	15	—	single only
1999	"Twisted Mess" (promotional only single)	—	—	—	—	—	—	—	—	—	—	Best Laid Plans / The Dancer
2018	"Kong"	—	—	—	—	—	—	—	—	—	—	Broken Politics
"—" denotes a single that did not chart or was not released in that region.

=== As featured artist ===
Year	Title	Peak chart positions											Album
Year	Title	SWE	AUS	FRA	GER	IRE	NL	NZ	PL	SWI	UK		Album
Year	Title	SWE	AUS	FRA	GER	IRE	NL	NZ	PL	SWI	UK	US	Album
1987	"Looking Good Diving" (with the Wild Bunch & Morgan-McVey)	—	—	—	—	—	—	—	—	—	—	—	Non-album single
1987	"Slow Train to Dawn" (with The The)	—	95	—	—	19	—	—	—	—	64	—	Infected
1994	"7 Seconds" (with Youssou N'Dour)	3	3	1	3	3	2	7	3	1	3	98	Man
1994	"Turn My Back" (with Hiroshi Fujiwara)	—	—	—	—	—	—	—	—	—	—	—	Nothing Much Better to Do
1995	"Love Can Build a Bridge" (with Cher, Chrissie Hynde & Eric Clapton)	—	—	—	62	5	41	—	30	21	1	—	Non-album single
2000	"Long Way Around" (with Eagle-Eye Cherry)	—	220	60	85	—	81	—	—	45	48	—	Living In the Present Future
2001	"Braided Hair" (with 1 Giant Leap & Speech)	—	138	—	—	—	96	—	—	—	78	—	1 Giant Leap
2002	"Think Twice" (with Groove Armada)	—	—	—	—	—	—	—	—	—	—	—	Lovebox
2006	"Kids with Guns" (with Gorillaz)	—	31	—	94	—	—	—	—	—	27	—	Demon Days
2006	"Tête à Tête" (with Petter)	—	—	—	—	—	—	—	—	—	—	—	P
2006	"Starved" (with CirKus)	—	—	—	—	—	—	—	—	—	—	—	Laylow
2006	"Is What It Is" (with CirKus featuring Martin Jondo)	—	—	—	—	—	—	—	—	—	—	—	Laylow
2007	"You're Such an..." (with CirKus)	—	—	—	—	—	—	—	—	—	—	—	Laylow
2007	"Wake Up (It's Africa Calling)" (with Youssou N'Dour)	—	—	—	—	—	—	—	—	—	—	—	Rokku Mi Rokka (Give and Take)
2008	"Forever" (with Kleerup)	56	—	—	—	—	—	—	—	—	—	—	Kleerup
2011	"Bells" (with CirKus)	—	—	—	—	—	—	—	—	—	—	—	Medicine
2020	"Wherever You Go" (with The Avalanches featuring Jamie xx & CLYPSO)	—	—	—	—	—	—	—	—	—	—	—	We Will Always Love You
2024	"Immortal Queen" (Remix) (with Sia featuring Chaka Khan)	—	—	—	—	—	—	—	—	—	—	—	Non-album single
2025	"New Dawn" (with Marshall Allen)	—	—	—	—	—	—	—	—	—	—	—	New Dawn
"—" denotes a single that did not chart or was not released in that region.

=== Videos ===
==== Video releases ====
Year	Album details	Notes
1989	The Rise of Neneh Cherry: Release date: 1989; Record label: BMG (#790335); Formats: VHS	Collection of six full-length music videos ("Buffalo Stance", "Manchild", "Buffalo Blues", "Kisses on the Wind", "So Here I Come" and "Inna City Mamma"), plus backstage footage intercut with live performances, press and TV interviews and recording sessions.

==== Music videos ====
Year	Title	Director	Notes
1988	"Buffalo Stance"	John Maybury	
1989	"Manchild"	Jean-Baptiste Mondino	
1989	"Kisses on the Wind"	N/A	
1989	"Buffalo Blues"	N/A	
1989	"So Here I Come"	N/A	
1989	"Inna City Mamma"	N/A	
1989	"Heart"	David Fincher	
1990	"I've Got You Under My Skin"	Jean-Baptiste Mondino	AIDS benefit for Red Hot Organization
1992	"Money Love"	N/A	
1993	"Buddy X"	Jean-Baptiste Mondino	
1994	"7 Seconds"	Stéphane Sednaoui	with Youssou N'Dour
1995	"Love Can Build a Bridge"	N/A	
1995	"Trouble Man"	N/A	
1996	"Woman"	Jamie Thraves	
1996	"Kootchi"	Jean-Baptiste Mondino	
1997	"Feel It"	Michel Gondry	
2000	"Long Way Around"	Nick Gordon	Eagle-Eye Cherry ft. Neneh Cherry
2002	"Braided Hair"	1 Giant Leap	1 Giant Leap ft. Neneh Cherry
2012	"Dream Baby Dream"	Ted Beagles	Four Tet Remix, with The Thing
2012	"Accordion"	Ted Beagles	Madvillain cover, with The Thing
2014	"Out of the Black"	Dario Vigorito	Neneh Cherry ft. Robyn
2014	"Everything"	Jean-Baptiste Mondino	
2014	"Spit Three Times"	Bafic	
2015	"He, She, Me"	Kathryn Ferguson & Alex Turvey	with Devonté Hynes
2018	"Kong"	Jenn Nkiru	

== Other charted songs ==
Year	Title	Peak chart positions	Album
Year	Title	US Mod.	Album
1992	"Trout" (featuring Michael Stipe)	2	Homebrew
