= The Versions =

Studio album by Neneh Cherry
- Released: 10 June 2022
- Genre: Pop; hip-hop
- Length: 40:42
- Label: EMI

Neneh Cherry chronology
Broken Politics (2018)	The Versions (2022)

The Versions ratings
Aggregate scores
Source	Rating
Metacritic	75/100
Review scores
Source	Rating
The Arts Desk	3/5 stars
Evening Standard	4/5 stars
The Guardian	3/5 stars
Mojo	4/5 stars
NME	4/5 stars
Pitchfork	6.8/10
The Skinny	3/5 stars
Spectrum Culture	80%

The Versions is the sixth studio album by Neneh Cherry, released on 10 June 2022 via EMI Records. The album consists of reworked versions of songs from Cherry's back catalogue, featuring guest appearances by artists including Robyn and Sia.

== Track listing ==
All tracks are written by Cameron McVey and Neneh Cherry, with other writers noted below.

The Versions track listing
No.	Title	Writer(s)	Producer	Length
1.	"Buffalo Stance" (featuring Robyn and Mapei)	Jamie Morgan; Phil Ramacon	Devonté Hynes	5:08
2.	"Manchild" (featuring Sia)	Robert Del Naja	Jesse Shatkin	3:18
3.	"Woman" (featuring Anohni)	Jonathan Peter Sharp	Anohni, Thomas Bartlett	5:04
4.	"Buddy X" (featuring Greentea Peng)	Jerry Barnes; Katreese Barnes; Paul Gorman	Earbuds	2:47
5.	"Kootchi" (featuring Jamila Woods)	Carina Soro; Steve Hopwood	Slot-A	3:29
6.	"Sassy" (featuring Tyson)	Chris Martin; Duke Jordan; Keith Elam	Femi Koleoso	3:49
7.	"Heart" (featuring Sudan Archives)		Sudan Archives	3:42
8.	"Kisses on the Wind" (featuring Seinabo Sey)		Academics	3:16
9.	"Manchild" (featuring Kelsey Lu)	Del Naja	Kelsey Lu	3:36
10.	"Buddy X (Honey Dijon Remix)"	J. Barnes; K. Barnes	Booga Bear, Jonny Dollar	6:33
Total length:				40:42

== Personnel ==
=== Musicians ===
- Neneh Cherry – vocals (10)
- Mapei – vocals (1)
- Robyn – vocals (1)
- Sia – vocals (2)
- Anohni – vocals (3)
- Greentea Peng – vocals (4)
- Jamila Woods – vocals (5)
- Justin Canavan – guitar (5)
- Tyson – vocals (6)
- Femi Koleoso – drums (6)
- Jordan Hadfield – bass, guitar (6)
- Sarah Tandy – keyboards (6)
- Sudan Archives – violin, vocals (7)
- Quran Shaheed – piano (7)
- Seinabo Sey – vocals (8)
- Kelsey Lu – vocals (9)

=== Production ===
- Neneh Cherry – programming (1–9)
- Joe LaPorta – mastering engineer (1–4, 6–9)
- Mikaelin "Blue" Bluespruce – mixing engineer (1, 4, 6, 8, 9)
- Robyn – synthesizer programming, vocal production (1)
- Ludvig Larsson – engineering (1)
- Michel Zitron – engineering, vocal production (1)
- Jesse Shatkin – mixing engineer (2)
- Samuel Dent – assistant recording engineer (2)
- Anohni – mixing engineer (3)
- Thomas Bartlett – mixing engineer (3)
- Earbuds – engineering (4)
- Matt Hennessey – mastering engineer, mixing engineer (5)
- Rick Fritz – engineering (5)
- Ty Caughell – assistant mixing engineer (5)
- Riccardo Damian – engineering (6)
- Hugh Fothergill – assistant recording engineer (6)
- Sudan Archives – programming, engineering (7)
- Tom Carmichael – mixing engineer (7)
- Academics – engineering (8)
- Kiukl Adelbai – engineering (9)
- Patrick Wimberly – engineering (9)
- Honey Dijon – remixing (10)
