= Bim (band) =

- Origin: England
- Genres: New wave, ska
- Years active: 1980–1982
- Label: Swerve Records
- Past members: Cameron McVey; Stephen Street; Brian Wren; Andy Harley; Bobby Henry

Bim were an English new wave band formed in 1980. They released seven singles between 1980 and 1982, and one album in 1982 on the Swerve record label.

== History ==
The band were formed in 1980 and consisted of members Cameron McVey (vocals), Stephen Street (bass, percussion), Bobby Henry (guitar), Andy Harley (keyboards) and Brian Wren (drums, percussion). Before Bim, Henry was a singer and released several singles on the A&M and Oval labels. The band played live gigs at venues such as the Half Moon in Herne Hill, South London.

The 1982 single "Blind Lead the Blind" was produced by Mick Jones of the Clash. Also in 1982, the single "Factory" received lots of airplay on BBC Radio 1.

== After Bim ==
Cameron McVey went on to become a successful songwriter and producer. In 1987, as one half of the duo Morgan-McVey together with Jamie Morgan, they released the single "Looking Good Diving" produced by Stock Aitken Waterman. Its B-side, "Looking Good Diving with the Wild Bunch" featured Neneh Cherry on vocals which would later be reworked into Cherry's worldwide hit "Buffalo Stance" in 1988. McVey and Cherry married in 1990. As well as producing for Cherry, McVey also produced for bands such as Massive Attack, Frente, Portishead, All Saints, Sugababes and Kitchen Party. McVey would also become a member of the groups the Dynamik Duo, Virgin Souls and cirKus.

Stephen Street also became a record producer, producing for bands and artists such as the Smiths and Morrissey, Blur, the Darling Buds, the Cranberries, Shed Seven, New Order, Suede, Kaiser Chiefs, the Ordinary Boys, Babyshambles and Pete Doherty, Feeder, the Zutons, and the Courteeners.

Guitarist Bobby Henry died on 20 September 2011.

== Discography ==
=== Albums ===
- 1982: Boobams Out!

=== Singles ===
- 1980: "Delicious Gone Wrong"
- 1981: "Romance"
- 1981: "Wally Rap"
- 1981: "Request Time"/"Don't Panic"
- 1982: "Blind Lead the Blind"
- 1982: "Factory"
- 1982: "Change!"
