= Woman (Neneh Cherry song) =

1996 single by Neneh Cherry

Single by Neneh Cherry

from the album Man
- B-side: "Had You in Me"; "Heart Throbs"; "Telephone Pole" (demo)
- Released: 22 July 1996
- Studio: Cherry Bear, Westside (London, England)
- Genre: Soul; trip hop
- Length: 4:37 (album version); 3:47 (radio edit)
- Label: Hut; Virgin
- Songwriters: Neneh Cherry; Cameron "Booga Bear" McVey; Jonathan Sharp
- Producers: Jonny Dollar; Cameron "Booga Bear" McVey

Neneh Cherry singles chronology
"Love Can Build a Bridge" (1995)	"Woman" (1996)	"Kootchi" (1996)

Music video
- "Woman" on YouTube

"Woman" is a song by Swedish singer-songwriter Neneh Cherry from her third studio album, Man (1996). Written by Cherry, her husband Cameron McVey, and Jonathan Sharp, the song was created as a take on American singer James Brown's 1966 hit "It's a Man's Man's Man's World". The song's lyrics describe the difficulties women face in life, allowing Cherry to be seen as an empowering female recording artist. Released on 22 July 1996 by Hut and Virgin Records, "Woman" became a chart hit in Europe and Australia, reaching the top 10 in Finland, Hungary, Iceland, Israel, the United Kingdom, and the Wallonia region of Belgium.

== Critical reception ==
Ross Jones from The Guardian described "Woman" as an "awe-inspiring new work", adding that it "evoke" James Brown's "It's a Man's Man's World", while the singer "bawls her soul into the mic." Eithne from Melody Maker viewed it as "a comment on male bullishness and the bitter way history has Tried erasing me, made with brooding strings and rockish guitars buried deep in the mix." Pan-European magazine Music & Media wrote that the song is Cherry's "own take" on the Brown song (this is a woman's world/ it's my world). "Even the melodies and chord changes sound the same, but this track obviously has a message: it's a tribute to femininity and its loving, caring power." Music Week gave it a full score of five out of five and named it Single of the Week, declaring it as "a gorgeous, heart-rending song in the vein of "Trout" and "Manchild". Cherry at her best." Writing for NME, Dele Fadele noted that the singer's "forages into soul possess an irreverence that lift otherwise earnest pastiches", stating that "Woman" rewrites Brown's song as a "feminist tract". British columnist James Masterton called "Woman" one of Cherry's best tracks up to that point, complimenting its mood and writing that it "beats the pants off anything she has released before".

== Commercial performance ==
"Woman" was released as a single on 22 July 1996, becoming Cherry's last substantial hit. It reached number two in Iceland, number three in Walloon Belgium, number four in Finland and Hungary, and number nine on the UK Singles Chart. In her native Sweden, the song peaked at number 20 in its second week, spending 10 weeks on the Swedish Singles Chart. Elsewhere in Europe, the single reached the top 20 in Flemish Belgium, France, Norway and Switzerland. On the Eurochart Hot 100, it peaked at number 21 during its second week on the chart, after a debut at number 37. In Australasia, "Woman" was moderately successful, peaking at number 17 in Australia and number 35 in New Zealand. In West Asia, it became a top-five hit in Israel, peaking at number five. The song has received a gold certification in France, denoting sales greater than 250,000.

== Aftermath ==
After the success of "Woman", Cherry stated that she felt she was pushing her limits with the level of fame she was experiencing, claiming that the success she was receiving was enjoyable, but it was not completely what she wanted. She explained, "The idea behind making 'Buffalo Stance' and Raw Like Sushi wasn't to be famous, it was to change things and do things the way that we do them, always with an idea of activism or a kind of rebellion."

== Track listings ==
- European CD single
1. "Woman" (Heavy Guitar mix)
2. "Had You in Me"
- European maxi-CD single

UK CD1
Australian and Japanese CD single

1. "Woman" – 4:37
2. "Heart Throbs" – 3:49
3. "Telephone Pole" (demo) – 4:57
4. "Woman" (Heavy Guitar mix) – 4:39

- UK CD2
1. "Woman" (La Funk Mob mix)
2. "Woman" (Alex Reece vocal mix)
3. "Had You in Me"
4. "Woman" (Alex Reece no vocal)
- UK cassette single
1. "Woman"
2. "Heart Throbs"
3. "Telephone Pole" (demo)

== Charts ==
=== Weekly charts ===
Chart (1996)	Peak position
Australia (ARIA)	17
Austria (Ö3 Austria Top 40)	21
Belgium (Ultratop 50 Flanders)	16
Belgium (Ultratop 50 Wallonia)	3
Europe (Eurochart Hot 100)	21
Europe (European Hit Radio)	2
Finland (Suomen virallinen lista)	4
France (SNEP)	14
France Airplay (Music & Media)	1
Germany (GfK)	52
Hungary (Mahasz)	4
Iceland (Íslenski Listinn Topp 40)	2
Ireland (IRMA)	29
Israel (Israeli Singles Chart)	5
Italy Airplay (Music & Media)	7
Netherlands (Dutch Top 40)	27
Netherlands (Single Top 100)	22
New Zealand (Recorded Music NZ)	35
Norway (VG-lista)	11
Poland Airplay (Music & Media)	7
Scottish Singles Sales (Official Charts)	12
Sweden (Sverigetopplistan)	20
Switzerland (Schweizer Hitparade)	12
UK Singles (Official Charts)	9

=== Year-end charts ===
Chart (1996)	Position
Belgium (Ultratop 50 Wallonia)	27
Europe (Eurochart Hot 100)	82
Europe (European Hit Radio)	4
France (SNEP)	61
Iceland (Íslenski Listinn Topp 40)	30
Israel (Israeli Singles Chart)	50
Switzerland (Schweizer Hitparade)	37
UK Airplay (Music Week)	44

== Certifications ==
Region	Certification	Certified units/sales
France (SNEP)	Gold	250,000^{*}
^{*} Sales figures based on certification alone.

== Release history ==
Region	Date	Format(s)	Label(s)	Ref.
United Kingdom	22 July 1996	CD; cassette	Virgin	
Japan	28 August 1996	CD	Virgin	
