= The Guide (Wommat) =

Studio album by Youssou N'Dour
- Released: 11 July 1994
- Recorded: September–October 1993
- Studio: Power Play (New York City); Xippi (Dakar)
- Genre: Pop; folk; world; country
- Length: 73:01
- Label: Columbia
- Producer: Verna Gillis

Youssou N'Dour chronology
| Special Noël (1993) | The Guide (Wommat) (1994) | Gainde (1995) |

Professional ratings
Review scores
| Source | Rating |
|---|---|
| AllMusic | 3/5 stars |
| Music Week | 3/5 stars |

The Guide (Wommat) is the seventh studio album by Senegalese singer and composer Youssou N'Dour. Recorded during the autumn of 1993 in both New York City and Dakar, the album was released on 11 July 1994 through Columbia Records. Featuring the hit single "7 Seconds", a duet with Neneh Cherry, The Guide (Wommat) is the commercially most successful album by N'Dour.

== Track listing ==
All tracks are written by Youssou N'Dour, except where noted.

| No. | Title | Lyrics | Music | Length |
|---|---|---|---|---|
| 1. | "Leaving (Dem)" | | | 5:03 |
| 2. | "Old Man (Gorgui)" | | | 6:30 |
| 3. | "Without a Smile (Same)" (featuring Branford Marsalis) | | | 4:12 |
| 4. | "Mame Bamba" | Y. N'Dour; Boubacar N'Dour | Mamadou Mbaye; Y. N'Dour | 4:58 |
| 5. | "7 Seconds" (with Neneh Cherry) | Y. N'Dour; Cherry | Cameron McVey; Jonathan Sharp | 5:06 |
| 6. | "How You Are (No Mele)" | Y. N'Dour; Kabou Gueye | Habib Faye; Gueye; Y. N'Dour | 3:39 |
| 7. | "Generations (Diamono)" | | | 5:46 |
| 8. | "Tourista" | | Jean-Philippe Rykiel | 4:36 |
| 9. | "Undecided (Japoulo)" | | Faye; Rykiel | 5:26 |
| 10. | "Love One Another (Beuguente)" | | Rykiel; Y. N'Dour | 4:51 |
| 11. | "Life (Adouna)" | | Rykiel | 4:04 |
| 12. | "My People (Samay Nit)" | Bouna N'Diaye | | 4:38 |
| 13. | "Oh Boy" | | | 4:37 |
| 14. | "Silence (Tongo)" | | | 4:38 |
| 15. | "Chimes of Freedom" | Bob Dylan | Dylan | 4:51 |
| Total length: | | | | 73:01 |

== Charts ==
Chart performance for The Guide (Wommat)
| Chart (1994–1995) | Peak position |
|---|---|
| Australian Albums (ARIA) | 39 |
| Austrian Albums (Ö3 Austria) | 11 |
| Belgian Albums (Ultratop Flanders) | 38 |
| Dutch Albums (Album Top 100) | 11 |
| European Albums (IFPI) | 17 |
| Finnish Albums (Suomen virallinen lista) | 15 |
| French Albums (IFOP) | 15 |
| German Albums (Offizielle Top 100) | 27 |
| Italian Albums (AFI) | 4 |
| Japanese Albums (Oricon) | 27 |
| New Zealand Albums (RMNZ) | 47 |
| Portuguese Albums (AFP) | 11 |
| Spanish Albums (AFYVE) | 8 |
| Swedish Albums (Sverigetopplistan) | 43 |
| Swiss Albums (Schweizer Hitparade) | 18 |
| UK Albums (Official Charts) | 87 |
| US World Albums (Billboard) | 2 |

== Certifications ==
Certifications for The Guide (Wommat)
| Region | Certification | Certified units/sales |
|---|---|---|
| France (SNEP) | 2× Gold | 200,000^{*} |
| Italy (FIMI) | Platinum | 100,000^{*} |
| Netherlands (NVPI) | Gold | 50,000^{^} |
| Spain (Promusicae) | Gold | 50,000^{^} |
| Switzerland (IFPI Switzerland) | Gold | 25,000^{^} |
^{*} Sales figures based on certification alone.^{^} Shipments figures based on certification alone.
