= I've Got You Under My Skin =

1936 song by Cole Porter

Song
- Published: 1936 by Chappell & Co.
- Genre: Vocal jazz; traditional pop
- Songwriter: Cole Porter

"I've Got You Under My Skin"

Song by Frank Sinatra

from the album Songs for Swingin' Lovers!
- Released: March 1956
- Recorded: October 1955–January 1956
- Studio: Capitol Studios, Los Angeles
- Length: 3:44
- Label: Capitol
- Songwriter: Cole Porter
- Producer: Voyle Gilmore

"I've Got You Under My Skin"

Single by the Four Seasons

from the album 2nd Vault of Golden Hits
- B-side: "Huggin' My Pillow"
- Released: August 1966
- Genre: Traditional pop; blue-eyed soul
- Length: 3:37
- Label: Philips
- Songwriter: Cole Porter
- Producer: Bob Crewe

The Four Seasons singles chronology
| "Opus 17 (Don't You Worry 'bout Me)" (1966) | "I've Got You Under My Skin" (1966) | "Tell It to the Rain" (1966) |

"I've Got You Under My Skin" is a song written by American composer Cole Porter in 1936. It was introduced that year in the Eleanor Powell musical film Born to Dance in which it was performed by Virginia Bruce. It was nominated for the Academy Award for Best Original Song that year but lost out to "The Way You Look Tonight". Popular recordings in 1936 were by Ray Noble and his Orchestra (vocal by Al Bowlly) and by Hal Kemp and his Orchestra (vocal by Skinnay Ennis).

The song has subsequently been recorded by hundreds of artists. It became a signature song for Frank Sinatra, and, in 1966, became a top-10 hit for The Four Seasons. Swedish singer-songwriter Neneh Cherry had a European hit with her reworking of the song for the 1990 Red Hot + Blue charity album.

== Charts ==
=== Weekly charts ===
Louis Prima and Keely Smith

| Chart (1959) | Peak position |
|---|---|
| US Billboard Hot 100 | 95 |

The Four Seasons

| Chart (1966) | Peak position |
|---|---|
| Canada RPM Top Singles | 9 |
| UK Singles (OCC) | 12 |
| US Billboard Hot 100 | 9 |
| US Cash Box Top 100 | 9 |

=== Year-end charts ===
The Four Seasons

| Chart (1966) | Rank |
|---|---|
| US (Joel Whitburn's Pop Annual) | 108 |

== Versions by Frank Sinatra ==
Sinatra first sang the song in 1946 on his weekly radio show, as the second part of a medley with "Easy to Love".

He recorded a studio version of the song with Nelson Riddle's orchestral arrangement, accompanied by Irv Cottler on drums and slide trombone solo by Milt Bernhart at Capitol's Melrose Avenue studios for his 1956 album Songs for Swingin' Lovers! Other musicians on the album included George Roberts (bass trombone) and Harry "Sweets" Edison (trumpet), along with various uncredited musicians for the remaining instrumentation (five saxophones, two more trombones, three more trumpets, double bass, two acoustic guitars, and 16 orchestral string instruments). The session was produced by Voyle Gilmore and engineered by John Palladino; Gilmore also later produced The Four Seasons' version of the song. Riddle was a fan of Maurice Ravel and said that this arrangement was inspired by the Boléro. Sinatra aficionados usually rank this as one of his finest collaborations with Riddle's orchestra.

Sinatra re-recorded "I've Got You Under My Skin" for the album Sinatra's Sinatra (1963), an album of re-recordings of his favourites. This time the trombone solo was by Dick Nash because Bernhart was unavailable.

A live version of the song appears on the 1966 album Sinatra at the Sands with Count Basie and his orchestra.

Another version of the song is an electronically assembled duet featuring Sinatra and U2 lead singer Bono on Sinatra's 1993 Duets album. The track was released on a "double A-side" with U2's "Stay (Faraway, So Close!)". The single peaked at number four on the UK charts.

Sinatra usually included "I've Got You Under My Skin" in his concerts, a tradition carried on by his son, Frank Sinatra Jr.

The song would be used for the opening of the 2015 game, Batman: Arkham Knight.

=== Certifications and sales ===
| Region | Certification | Certified units/sales |
|---|---|---|
| United Kingdom (BPI) | Silver | 200,000^{‡} |
^{‡} Sales+streaming figures based on certification alone.

== Neneh Cherry version ==
"I've Got You Under My Skin"

Single by Neneh Cherry

from the album Red Hot + Blue
- B-side: "I've Got You Under My Skin" (instrumental)
- Released: September 17, 1990
- Length: 3:46
- Label: Circa
- Songwriter: Cole Porter
- Producers: Baby Afrika Bambaataa; Booga Bear; Jonny Dollar; Neneh Cherry

Neneh Cherry singles chronology
| "Kisses on the Wind" (1989) | "I've Got You Under My Skin" (1990) | "Money Love" (1992) |

Music video
- "I've Got You Under My Skin" on YouTube

Swedish singer-songwriter and rapper Neneh Cherry's interpretation of "I've Got You Under My Skin" was released as the lead single for the Red Hot + Blue charity album in September 1990 and reached number 25 on the UK Singles Chart. Additionally, it was a top-10 hit in Greece and entered the top 20 in the Netherlands and Sweden. It received critical acclaim from music critics. The accompanying music video was directed by Jean-Baptiste Mondino. Cherry replaced most of the lyrics with a rap on AIDS victims and how society reacts to them. Of the original Cole Porter lyrics, she kept only the first four lines and "Use your mentality, wake up to reality".

=== Critical reception ===
William Ruhlmann from AllMusic described the song as one of the most "radical reinterpretations" on Red Hot + Blue. David Browne from Entertainment Weekly felt the words have special urgency in Cherry's "stark, bass-line-propelled take" on "I’ve Got You Under My Skin", because the song begins with a rap about AIDS. Paul Lester from Melody Maker wrote that it's "pretty much unrecognisable from the original tinkly-suave piano nugget loved by pub singers and talent show chancers the world over." He explained, "Neneh's version starts with a rap, leads into a rubbery "White Lines" bass squiggle, before steel thwacks and programmed claps enclose the song in a glistening metal case. Not bad." Pan-European magazine Music & Media called it an "utterly brooding version of the old Cole Porter song, in a splendid production for the Jungle Brothers' Baby Afrika Bambaataa."

Nick Robinson from Music Week stated, "With its dark atmosphere and subject matter, it's grim but effective." Gavin Martin from New Musical Express wrote, "Her provocative revision [...] not only reaffirms her status as the straightest, sharpest shooting soul sister on the block but matches sensitivity with invective in an elegant, mysterious refrain." Parry Gettelman from the Orlando Sentinel found that the singer "eerily deconstructs "I've Got You Under My Skin" and injects it with a hip-hop safe-sex message." James Hunter from Rolling Stone remarked that the "genuine innovations" of Cherry set the tone of the album. Marc Andrews from Smash Hits felt the track "is the closest any of the artists here get to really putting the message across". Chris Norris from Spin complimented the singer-songwriter's "chillingly metaphorical" version of the jazz standard.

=== Charts ===
==== Weekly charts ====
| Chart (1990) | Peak position |
|---|---|
| Australia (ARIA) | 61 |
| Belgium (Ultratop 50 Flanders) | 27 |
| Europe (Eurochart Hot 100) | 52 |
| Germany (GfK) | 23 |
| Greece (IFPI) | 6 |
| Netherlands (Dutch Top 40) | 14 |
| Netherlands (Single Top 100) | 14 |
| New Zealand (Recorded Music NZ) | 32 |
| Sweden (Sverigetopplistan) | 16 |
| Switzerland (Schweizer Hitparade) | 25 |
| UK Singles (Official Charts) | 25 |

==== Year-end charts ====
| Chart (1990) | Position |
|---|---|
| Sweden (Topplistan) | 76 |

=== Release history ===
| Region | Date | Format(s) | Label(s) | Ref. |
|---|---|---|---|---|
| Europe | September 17, 1990 | 7-inch vinyl; 12-inch vinyl; CD | Circa; Virgin | |
| Australia | October 1, 1990 | 7-inch vinyl; 12-inch vinyl; cassette | Circa; Virgin | |
| Japan | November 21, 1990 | Mini-CD | Circa; Virgin | |
