= Mapei (rapper) =

American rapper (born 1983)

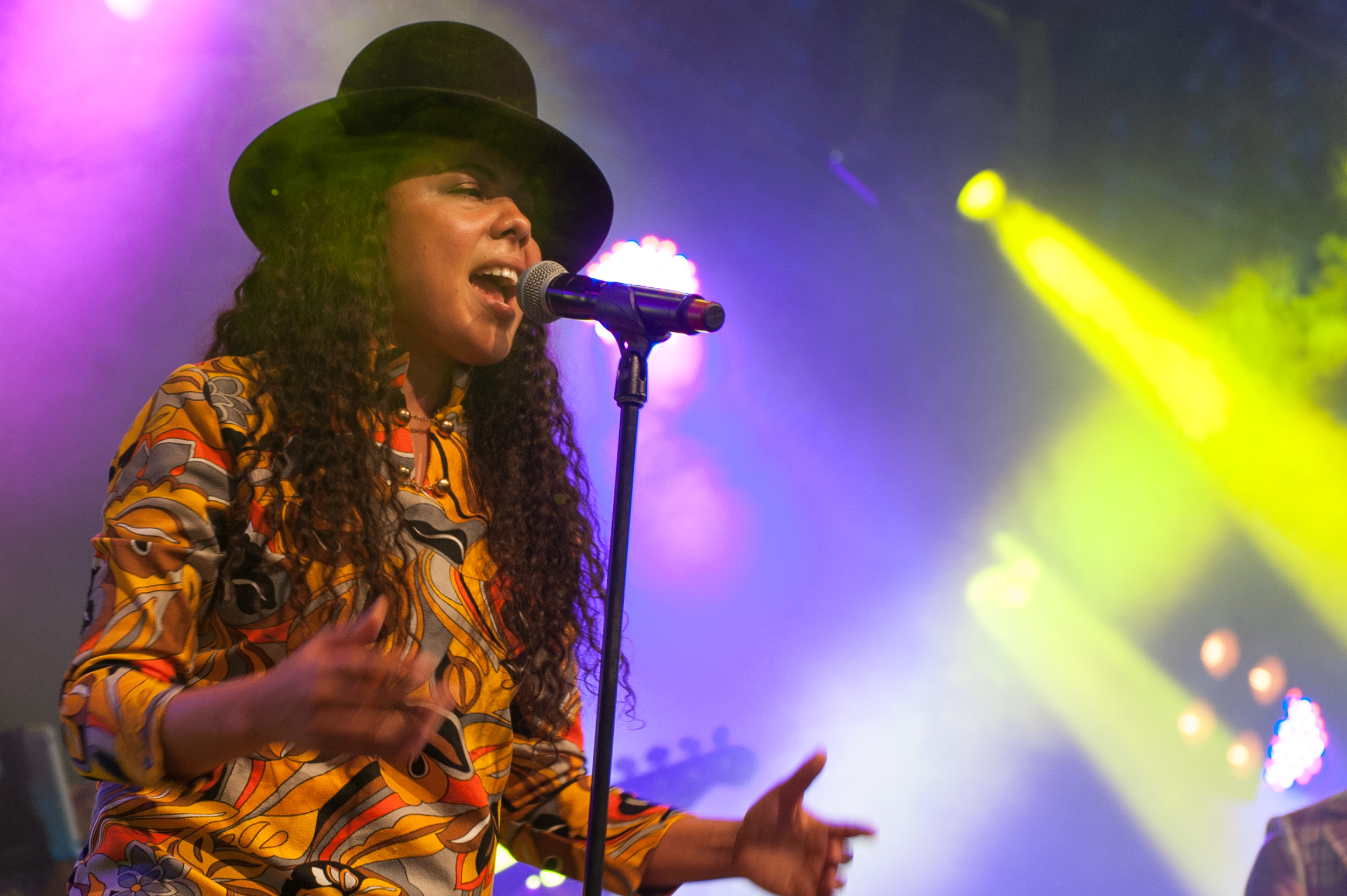
- Mapei at Way Out West in Sweden, 2014

Background information
- Born: Jacqueline Mapei Cummings; December 20, 1983 (age 42); Providence, Rhode Island, U.S.
- Origin: Stockholm, Sweden
- Genres: Indie pop, hip hop, hip hop soul
- Years active: 2009–present
- Label: Downtown

Jacqueline Mapei Cummings (born December 20, 1983), is an American-Swedish rapper and singer, best known for her single "Don't Wait", which was released via Downtown Records in 2013. Her debut EP, The Cocoa Butter Diaries, was released in 2009 also via Downtown Records. Her debut album, Hey Hey, was released on September 23, 2014.

== History ==
=== Early life ===
Mapei was born in Providence, Rhode Island, but moved before she turned ten years old. She began splitting her time between the US and Sweden after her Liberian mother and Swedish stepfather moved to Stockholm, living in Stockholm during the school year and returning to the US for the summers. She moved to Brooklyn at age eighteen, working as a bartender in a Swedish restaurant in New York's Chinatown neighborhood. She stayed for three years, taking in the local scene for a period before deciding to return to Sweden and immerse herself in Stockholm's pop scene.

=== The Cocoa Butter Diaries (2009–2012) ===
Mapei released her debut EP as a rapper on Downtown Records in 2009. After the release of The Cocoa Butter Diaries, Mapei began work on her debut album with French electronic duo Justice. However, she was not happy with the final result, and decided to scrap the record. After realizing that she was hitting a wall creatively, she came to the conclusion that she wanted to start singing, telling W: "I was just out there freestyling without writing any songs ... I needed to find some inspiration." She spent the following years traveling, which led to extend stays in Tunisia, Portugal, and Brazil. After a particularly inspiring stint in Brazil, she decided to return to Stockholm and began working with producer Magnus Lidehäll.

=== "Don't Wait" and Hey Hey (2013–present) ===
"Don't Wait" premiered on the website of the magazine The Fader in October 2013. The track went viral immediately, repeatedly reaching #1 on the Hype Machine charts. It received universally positive reviews, with W declaring the song a "devilishly crafted piece of pop perfection" and Vogue praising it for possessing "catchy pop sensibility without falling into the trap of soft-edged lyricism."

The song was remixed by a number of high-profile producers, including a very popular edit by Australian DJ Brynny, and others from Frankie Knuckles, Kingdom, and Giraffage. A version featuring Chance the Rapper was released in March 2014. A remix EP and a video for the original version of "Don't Wait" were released on April 1, 2014. The song debuted on the Billboard Hot Dance Club chart in May 2014 at number 48. The song also charted in UK's and Italy's Airplay Charts at number 173 and 88 respectively.

Mapei's released her second single "Change" on June 10, 2014, followed by "Believe" on August 18. Her debut album Hey Hey was released September 23, 2014, and debuted at #29 on the Heatseeker chart. Mapei performed "Don't Wait" on the Late Show with David Letterman on November 6, 2014. She has cited Radiohead, Donna Summer, Irene Cara, Diana Ross, Missy Elliott, Brandy, Queens of the Stone Age, and Michael Jackson as influences.

Her single "Million Ways to Live" was released in 2015.

In 2019, she released her second album "Sensory Overload", with the Stockholm-based record label Amuse. The album contains ten songs and was nominated for a Grammis, which is the Swedish equivalent of a Grammy Award.

== Discography ==
=== Albums ===
Year	Album	Peak positions	
Year	Album	SWE	US Heat
2014	Hey Hey	35	29
2019	Sensory Overload	—	—
2021	Lullabies (with Timbuktu)	—	—

=== EPs ===
- 2009: The Cocoa Butter Diaries
- 2014: Don't Wait EP

=== Singles ===
==== As lead artist ====
Year	Title	Peak chart positions					Album
Year	Title	SWE	BEL	NLD	UK	US Club	Album
2013	"Don't Wait"	—	43	88	117	27	Hey Hey
2014	"Change"	—	—	—	—	—	Hey Hey
2014	"Believe"	—	—	—	—	—	Hey Hey
2023	"Don't Say Hello"	— (Note: "Don't Say Hello" did not enter the Swedish Singellista Chart, but peaked at number 11 on the Swedish Heatseeker Chart.)	—	—	—	—	Non-album singles
2023	"Minns ikväll"	48	—	—	—	—	Non-album singles
2024	"Salut"	71	—	—	—	—	Non-album singles

==== As featured artist ====
Year	Single	Album
2018	"Feel About You" (Silk City featuring Mapei)	Electricity
2022	"Time" (Swedish House Mafia featuring Mapei)	Paradise Again
2022	"Buffalo Stance" (Neneh Cherry featuring Robyn and Mapei)	The Versions

=== Appearances ===
- "Mary Jane" (2009) – Major Lazer

=== Music videos ===
Title	Year	Director(s)
"Don't Wait"	2014	Dori Oskowitz
"Change"	2014	Philippe Grenade & Jarret Egan
