= Blank Project =

Studio album by Neneh Cherry
- Released: 25 February 2014
- Recorded: December 2013
- Genre: Electronic, trip hop, experimental
- Length: 48:52
- Label: Smalltown Supersound
- Producer: Four Tet

Neneh Cherry chronology
Man (1996)	Blank Project (2014)	Broken Politics (2018)

Singles from Blank Project
- 1. "Everything" Released: 24 January 2014; 2. "Out of the Black" Released: February 2014; 3. "Spit Three Times" Released: 26 October 2014

Blank Project is the fourth studio album by Neneh Cherry, released by Smalltown Supersound on 25 February 2014. The record is Cherry's first album of solo music in 18 years. It was recorded and mixed over a five-day period in Woodstock, New York. It was produced by Four Tet's Kieran Hebden and features a guest appearance by Robyn. The record also includes work with prior collaborators, synth/drum duo RocketNumberNine. Critical reviews of the album were positive.

== Description ==
Cherry wrote the material as a way to mourn for her mother, who died in 2009. The record is a departure from her previous work, consisting of a more sparse sound, with loose drums and a few synthesizers as the only accompaniment to her voice. RocketNumberNine provides industrial beats.

== Critical reception ==
Professional ratings
Aggregate scores
Source	Rating
AnyDecentMusic?	8.0/10
Metacritic	82/100
Review scores
Source	Rating
AllMusic	4.5/5 stars
The A.V. Club	A−
The Daily Telegraph	4/5 stars
The Guardian	4/5 stars
The Independent	5/5 stars
NME	8/10
Pitchfork	7.7/10
Q	4/5 stars
Rolling Stone	3.5/5 stars
Spin	8/10

Blank Project received widespread critical acclaim upon its release. At Metacritic, which assigns a normalized rating out of 100 to reviews from mainstream critics, the album has received an average score of 82, based on 36 reviews, indicating "universal acclaim". NPR calls the work "stark and urgent, almost entirely percussive. Her lyrics are less rebel treatises than koans or ruminations." Spin says it is "a stark, bracing, and emotionally vulnerable album that straddles the jazz, pop, and electronic worlds rather brilliantly." The Guardian calls it "a bold and adventurous album".

The Arts Desk describes the record: "High on rhythms and percussion and low on conventional melodies, it certainly isn’t easy listening but is frequently bold and challenging, with harsh electronica providing the only accompaniment to Neneh’s warm vocals." The Skinny calls Blank Project a "triumph."

Electronic Beats says: "Blank Project is an upturned bag on a table, pouring out its contents for anyone to sort through: chewed up emotions, snotty little insecurities and the kind of anxiety that’ll etch red marks into the skin if you carry it around too long."

In Vice, Robert Christgau gave the album a one-star honorable mention, naming "Out of the Black" and "Spit Three Times" as highlights, while writing, "long-ago hipster-funk ingénue reclaims her avant-garde roots".

== Track listing ==
All lyrics are written by Neneh Cherry, Cameron McVey and Paul Simm

Blank Project track listing
No.	Title	Length
1.	"Across the Water"	3:28
2.	"Blank Project"	4:05
3.	"Naked"	3:57
4.	"Spit Three Times"	4:18
5.	"Weightless"	5:46
6.	"Cynical"	4:10
7.	"422"	5:21
8.	"Out of the Black" (featuring Robyn)	5:15
9.	"Dossier"	5:12
10.	"Everything"	7:20
Total length:		48:52

=== Bonus tracks ===
- Rough Trade / Piccadilly Records:
  - CD version: Bonus CD
  - LP version: Double LP with CD of album and bonus CD

=== Bonus CD ===
The Blank Project - Bonus Remix Disc (available via Rough Trade Records and Piccadilly Records

1. "Everything" (Radio Edit)
2. "Out of the Black" (featuring Robyn) (Joe Goddard Extended Version)
3. "Everything" (Villalobos & Loderbauer: Vilod Low Blood Pressure Mix)
4. "Out of the Black" (featuring Robyn) (Bouvet Remix)

== Personnel ==
- Neneh Cherry - vocals
- Robyn - vocals on "Out of the Black"
- RocketNumberNine - music
- Producer – Four Tet

== Charts ==
Chart performance for Blank Project
Chart (2014)	Peak position
Austrian Albums (Ö3 Austria)	38
Belgian Albums (Ultratop Flanders)	44
Belgian Albums (Ultratop Wallonia)	65
Dutch Albums (Album Top 100)	71
German Albums (Offizielle Top 100)	39
Scottish Albums (OCC)	70
Swedish Albums (Sverigetopplistan)	40
Swiss Albums (Schweizer Hitparade)	28
UK Albums (OCC)	41
UK Independent Albums (OCC)	6
