= Broken Politics =

Studio album by Neneh Cherry
- Released: 19 October 2018
- Recorded: June 2017–June 2018
- Studios: Creative, Woodstock, New York; Cherry Bear, London
- Genres: Trip hop, soul, experimental
- Length: 46:01
- Label: Smalltown Supersound
- Producer: Kieran Hebden

Neneh Cherry chronology
Blank Project (2014)	Broken Politics (2018)	The Versions (2022)

Singles from Broken Politics
- 1. "Kong" Released: 1 August 2018; 2. "Natural Skin Deep" Released: 5 February 2019

Broken Politics is the fifth solo album by singer Neneh Cherry, and her second to be produced by Four Tet. The album was released on 19 October 2018, and has been called "quieter and more reflective" than its predecessor Blank Project. The lead single, "Kong", was released two months earlier, and "Shot Gun Shack" was released as the second single.

== Background ==
Broken Politics was recorded at Creative Music Studio in Woodstock, New York, which was once used by Cherry's stepfather, jazz musician Don Cherry, and makes use of samples from the recordings of Ornette Coleman, a longtime collaborator of the elder Cherry. The studio was founded by another collaborator of the elder Cherry, Karl Berger, who contributed to the album; Neneh Cherry's longtime partner Cameron McVey also made many contributions.

Some of the album's lyrics were inspired by Cherry's recent sojourn in Sierra Leone, where she arranged the funeral of her biological father, musician Ahmadu Jah, in his home village. The album also addresses the political situation in 2018, with Cherry stating, "It’s difficult. It’s a quite dark time. It’s hard to not draw from the things that are happening, but even though I feel anger, sorrow, and sadness, I’m also compelled to have some positivity. It’s important to react back in the other direction." In another interview, Cherry further described the album's theme: "I like writing from a personal perspective, and the time we live in is so much about finding your own voice. People have been left feeling misheard, misunderstood, and disillusioned. What the fuck can I do? Maybe politics starts in your bedroom, or your house — a form of activism, and a responsibility. The album is about all of those things: feeling broken, disappointed, and sad, but having perseverance. It’s a fight against the extinction of free thought and spirit."

The entire album was produced by Kieran Hebden, otherwise known as Four Tet. Except for a cameo appearance by Berger on vibraphone on "Synchronised Devotion", and some snippets of city life recorded on Cherry's cellphone, all of the album's music came from Hebden's laptop, using libraries of instrument sounds, samples and synthetic ones.

“I made the whole thing in the computer,” Hebden said in an interview at Berger's studio. “I knew I was making something that was going to evoke the mood, that you would listen to it and it would sound like there were a group of musicians playing there. But nothing like that happened at all, ever”. Neneh said: “The music is made for real, even if it’s loops and coming from a computer. To me there are definitely sounds and a feeling in some of the tracks that remind me of the music that was made in the room, some of the music that brought me to where I’m sitting at now — the music that my parents made and the music I grew up around. It’s interesting, using the idea of organic music but making it in the way we’re making music — the way we carry the torch”

Neneh said of Berger's contribution: “Another really important person on this record is Karl Berger, and he plays the vibraphone on “Synchronised Devotion”. He's a really close friend of my family's. We worked between here and his studio in Woodstock. That was kind of an amazing full circle. He played that same vibraphone with my dad 50 years ago. It's deep. Parts of the record were made at his studio. It's a beautiful place, and it's part of the womb that I come from”

== Critical reception ==
Professional ratings
Aggregate scores
Source	Rating
AnyDecentMusic?	7.6/10
Metacritic	81/100
Review scores
Source	Rating
AllMusic	4/5 stars
The Guardian	5/5 stars
Mojo	4/5 stars
NME	3/5 stars
The Observer	3/5 stars
Pitchfork	7.3/10
Q	4/5 stars
Rolling Stone	4/5 stars
The Times	4/5 stars
Uncut	8/10

At Metacritic, which assigns a weighted mean rating out of 100 to reviews from mainstream critics, the album has an average score of 81 based on 19 reviews, indicating "universal acclaim". AllMusic described the album as "deeply meditative, often implying or directly expressing sorrow regarding planetary afflictions rooted in fear," while maintaining Cherry's well-known "defiant streak." Music magazine The Muse called the album "perhaps [Cherry's] strongest and most sophisticated — every bit as vivid, sensitive, and forward-thinking as Joni Mitchell was in the mid-’70s, "and concluded, "Broken Politics quietly expands the concept of what a singer-songwriter album looks like in 2018." Rolling Stone gave the album a positive review, stating "Neneh Cherry has always bent styles to serve her own ends. She’s still doing it on Broken Politics, which folds a career’s worth of musical obsessions into a single set. She’s also speaking her mind, per usual, addressing our global shitshow not with histrionics, but with heartfelt, clear-eyed ruminations, sorrow, playfulness and resolve." Laura Snapes of The Guardian commented, "Big issues litter Broken Politics... In that beautifully snagged raw-silk voice, she sings about abortion, refugees, gun violence and the ease with which conspiracy calcifies into assumed fact these days. But it never feels heavy-handed."

== Track listing ==
No.	Title	Writer(s)	Length
1.	"Fallen Leaves"	Neneh Cherry; Kieran Hebden; Cameron McVey; Paul Simm	3:20
2.	"Kong"	Cherry; Hebden; McVey; Robert Del Naja; Euan Dickenson	4:25
3.	"Poem Daddy"	Suliaman El Hadi	0:49
4.	"Synchronised Devotion"	Cherry; Hebden; McVey	4:08
5.	"Deep Vein Thrombosis"	Cherry; Hebden; McVey; John Tonks	4:32
6.	"Faster Than the Truth"	Cherry; Hebden; McVey; Benjamin Page	3:47
7.	"Natural Skin Deep"	Cherry; Hebden; Simm; McVey	4:41
8.	"Shot Gun Shack"	Cherry; Hebden; McVey	3:58
9.	"Black Monday"	Cherry; Hebden; Simm; McVey	4:42
10.	"Cheap Breakfast Special"	Cherry; Hebden; McVey	1:09
11.	"Slow Release"	Cherry; Hebden; McVey; Preetesh Hirji; Simm	5:42
12.	"Soldier"	Cherry; Hebden; McVey; Simm	4:55
Total length:			46:01

== Personnel ==
- Kieran Hebden – production, mixing
- Robert "3D" Del Naja – production on "Kong"
- Wolfgang Tillmans – photography, front cover artwork
- Jacob Grønbech Jensen – design
- Professor Karl Berger – vibraphone on "Synchronised Devotion"

== Charts ==
Chart performance for Broken Politics
Chart (2018)	Peak position
Austrian Albums (Ö3 Austria)	46
Belgian Albums (Ultratop Flanders)	72
Belgian Albums (Ultratop Wallonia)	155
Dutch Albums (Album Top 100)	199
French Albums (SNEP)	196
German Albums (Offizielle Top 100)	55
Scottish Albums (Official Charts)	36
Swiss Albums (Schweizer Hitparade)	52
UK Albums (Official Charts)	76
UK Independent Albums (Official Charts)	8
