= 7 Seconds (song) =

1994 single by Youssou N'Dour and Neneh Cherry

Single by Youssou N'Dour and Neneh Cherry

from the album The Guide (Wommat)
- Language: English, French, Wolof
- B-side: "Mame Bamba"
- Released: 7 June 1994
- Studio: Power Play (New York)
- Length: 5:07
- Label: Columbia; Chaos
- Songwriters: Neneh Cherry; Youssou N'Dour; Cameron McVey; Jonathan Sharp
- Producers: Booga Bear; Jonny Dollar; Christian Falk (uncredited)

Youssou N'Dour singles chronology
"Shakin' the Tree" (1989)	"7 Seconds" (1994)	"So Many Men" (2002)

Neneh Cherry singles chronology
"Buddy X" (1993)	"7 Seconds" (1994)	"Love Can Build a Bridge" (1995)

Music video
- "7 Seconds" on YouTube

"7 Seconds" is a song performed by Senegalese singer-songwriter Youssou N'Dour and Swedish singer-songwriter Neneh Cherry. The pair also wrote the lyrics, with music composed by producers Cameron McVey (Booga Bear) and Jonathan Sharp (Jonny Dollar). The song achieved success upon release as a single on 7 June 1994 via Columbia Records, reaching the top 10 in numerous countries; in France, it stayed at number one for 16 weeks, a record at the time. N'Dour featured the song on his seventh album, The Guide (Wommat) (1994), while Cherry included it on her 1996 album Man.

"7 Seconds" also won the MTV Europe Music Award in the category for Best Song of 1994. Stéphane Sednaoui directed the accompanying music video for the song, which was shot in black-and-white and filmed in New York City. NME magazine ranked "7 Seconds" number 40 in their list of the 50 best songs of 1994.

== Recording ==
According to Swedish music producer Christian Falk, he produced the track, played bass and programmed the drums and other instruments. However, he received no credit and had to hire lawyers to get the money due to him. The song is trilingual as N'Dour sings in three languages: French, English and the West African language Wolof. Cherry sings only in English. The English chorus was actually recorded by another singer as Youssou was ill during the production of the song.

The title and refrain of the song refers to the first moments of a child's life; as Cherry put it, "not knowing about the problems and violence in our world". Shocked by the single's enormous commercial success, she told The Independent in an interview: "We did it as an experiment. The tune grew on its own, completely out of proportion. It was out there doing its own thing. But that is a dream when you write a song."

== Critical reception ==
Swedish Aftonbladet complimented the song as a "floating airy and heavenly beautiful synth ballad". Peter Stepek from AllMusic called it a "vaguely menacing duet". Larry Flick from Billboard magazine felt it is "unique and thoroughly pleasing", noting that the "haunting tune is padded with cushiony synths and a richly soulful bass line. Cherry offers a sweet and charming contrast to N'Dour's gritty vocal." Troy J. Augusto from Cashbox wrote that the "compelling duet nicely swirls N'Dour's husky vocals and Cherry's sweet, angelic voice into a nifty, down-tempo stroll that has broad radio potential." He added further that it is "powered by a rolling bass line and layers of passive synthesizer strains". Dave Sholin from the Gavin Report viewed the song as "music to stir the senses combined with lyrics that make a powerful case for our common humanity." He remarked that it "is especially powerful in light of recent events in South Africa and it's made that much more riveting by the melding of these two voices. Its worth spending some time with this amazing track."

In his weekly UK chart commentary, James Masterton praised it as a "gorgeous ballad". Pan-European magazine Music & Media complimented Cherry as "again brilliant" and described the song as "afro-hop", complimenting it as "melodic, synthy, sexy and with a slow beat." Wendi Cermak from The Network Forty described it as "haunting". Dele Fadele from NME named "7 Seconds" Single of the Week, noting that N'Dour duets with Cherry "to quite surprising results". He added that the voices "are pearls at 300 feet below sea level" and the arrangements "work wonders". In a separate review, Fadele opined that the song "makes like a future African sci-fi rumination on colour prejudice, with Yossou N'Dour's beguiling tones on show." Emma Cochrane from Smash Hits gave it a top score of five out of five and named it Best New Single, saying that "whoever came up with the idea of putting them on the same record was a genius." She concluded: "Hopefully in the charts for a very long time." David Sinclair from The Times wrote: "Built around a gentle boombox beat overlaid by drifting synthesizer chords, the song achieves the same seductive combination of rhythm and rumination that informed Bruce Springsteen's recent hit 'Streets of Philadelphia'."

== Chart performance ==
"7 Seconds" was a worldwide hit, peaking within the top 10 of the charts in several countries, including Australia, Austria, Belgium, Brazil, Germany, Ireland, the Netherlands (number two), Sweden, Paraguay and the United Kingdom. It climbed to the top position in the Walloon region of Belgium, Finland, France, Iceland, Israel, Italy and Switzerland. It stayed at number one for 16 consecutive weeks on the French Singles Chart, which was the record for the most weeks at the top position at the time. On the Eurochart Hot 100, the song reached number two. It was awarded with a gold record in Austria, France, Germany, the Netherlands, Switzerland and the United Kingdom.

== Music video ==
The black-and-white music video for "7 Seconds" was directed by French director, photographer, film producer and actor Stéphane Sednaoui. It was filmed in New York City and features people of different ethnicities walking by while the two are singing. When N'Dour and Cherry sing the chorus, different kinds of people's faces appear. The video received heavy rotation on MTV Europe and was A-listed on Germany's VIVA in August 1994.

== Impact and legacy ==
NME magazine ranked "7 Seconds" number 40 in their list of the 50 best songs of 1994. It was included in the 2010 book 1001 Songs You Must Hear Before You Die. Eloise Parker remarked that "the soul of '7 seconds' is N'Dour's heartfelt vocals, sung in Wolof and French, enhanced by Cherry's haunting English-language chorus."

== Cover versions ==
In 1994, the same year of the original one, Lover's released a cover of "7 Seconds" that peaked at number four on the Spain Singles Chart. In 2010, the song was covered by Thomas D under the title "Million Voices (7 Seconds)" and reached number 16 on the German Singles Chart and number 64 on the Swiss Singles Chart.

== Formats and track listings ==
- UK CD single (660508-2)
1. "7 Seconds" (radio edit)
2. "7 Seconds" (LP version)
3. "7 Seconds" (new old mix)
4. "7 Seconds" (dub mix)
5. "7 Seconds" (hip hop mix)
- US CD single (Chaos/Columbia 42K 77482)
1. "7 Seconds" (album version) – 5:07
2. "7 Seconds" (new old mix) – 5:44
3. "7 Seconds" (hip hop mix) – 6:24
4. "7 Seconds" (dub mix) – 6:08
5. "Mame Bamba" by Youssou N'Dour – 5:00
- CD maxi
1. "7 Seconds" – 4:10
2. "Mame Bamba" by Youssou N'Dour – 4:57
3. "7 Seconds" (R & B to the hip hop drop mix) – 6:24
4. "7 Seconds" (dub mix) – 6:07
- CD maxi (7 June 1994)
1. "7 Seconds" – 4:10
2. "Life (Adouna)" by Youssou N'Dour – 4:57
3. "7 Seconds" (R & B to the hip hop drop mix) – 6:24
4. "7 Seconds" – 6:07
- CD maxi (7 June 1994)
1. "7 Seconds" (radio edit) – 4:06
2. "Life (Adouna)" by Youssou N'Dour – 4:02
3. "7 Seconds" (R & B to the hip hop drop mix) – 6:23
4. "7 Seconds" (dub mix) – 6:07

== Charts ==
=== Weekly charts ===
1994 weekly chart performance for "7 Seconds"
Chart (1994)	Peak position
Australia (ARIA)	3
Austria (Ö3 Austria Top 40)	3
Belgium (Ultratop 50 Flanders)	3
Belgium (Ultratop 50 Wallonia)	1
Canada Top Singles (RPM)	15
Canada Adult Contemporary (RPM)	32
Denmark (IFPI)	10
Europe (Eurochart Hot 100)	2
Europe (European AC Radio)	1
Europe (European Hit Radio)	1
Finland (Suomen virallinen lista)	1
France (SNEP)	1
Germany (GfK)	3
Iceland (Íslenski Listinn Topp 40)	1
Ireland (IRMA)	3
Israel (Israeli Singles Chart)	1
Italy (Musica e dischi)	1
Mexico (Notitas Musicales)	2
Netherlands (Dutch Top 40)	2
Netherlands (Single Top 100)	2
New Zealand (Recorded Music NZ)	7
Norway (VG-lista)	4
Scottish Singles Sales (Official Charts)	4
Spain (AFYVE)	8
Sweden (Sverigetopplistan)	3
Switzerland (Schweizer Hitparade)	1
UK Singles (Official Charts)	3
UK Airplay (Music Week)	1
US Billboard Hot 100	98

2025 weekly chart performance for "7 Seconds"
Chart (2025)	Peak position
Moldova Airplay (TopHit)	70

=== Year-end charts ===
Year-end chart performance for "7 Seconds"
Chart (1994)	Position
Australia (ARIA)	29
Austria (Ö3 Austria Top 40)	10
Belgium (Ultratop)	11
Europe (Eurochart Hot 100)	6
Europe (European Hit Radio)	2
France (SNEP)	1
Germany (Media Control)	15
Iceland (Íslenski Listinn Topp 40)	5
Israel (Israeli Singles Chart)	4
Italy (Musica e dischi)	5
Netherlands (Dutch Top 40)	8
Netherlands (Single Top 100)	15
New Zealand (RIANZ)	46
Sweden (Topplistan)	19
Switzerland (Schweizer Hitparade)	2
UK Singles (OCC)	16
UK Airplay (Music Week)	4

=== Decade-end charts ===
Chart (1990–1999)	Rank
Netherlands (Dutch Top 40)	87

== Certifications ==
Certifications and sales for "7 Seconds"
Region	Certification	Certified units/sales
Australia (ARIA)	Gold	35,000^{^}
Austria (IFPI Austria)	Gold	25,000^{*}
France (SNEP)	Gold	250,000^{*}
Germany (BVMI)	Gold	250,000^{^}
Netherlands (NVPI)	Gold	50,000^{^}
New Zealand (RMNZ)	Platinum	10,000^{*}
Spain (Promusicae)	Gold	25,000^{^}
Switzerland (IFPI Switzerland)	Gold	25,000^{^}
United Kingdom (BPI)	Gold	420,000
^{*} Sales figures based on certification alone.^{^} Shipments figures based on certification alone.

== Release history ==
Release dates and formats for "7 Seconds"
Region	Date	Format(s)	Label(s)	Ref.
Europe	7 June 1994	CD	Columbia; Chaos	
Australia	4 July 1994	CD; cassette	Columbia; Chaos	
Japan	21 July 1994	CD	Sony; Chaos	

== See also ==
- List of number-one singles of 1994 (France)
