= CirKus =

Trip hop band

- Origin: London, England / Stockholm, Sweden
- Genres: Trip hop, alternative dance, electronic
- Years active: 2005–present
- Label: Tent Music
- Members: Burt Ford; Neneh Cherry; Lolita Moon; Karmil; Thomas Nordström (live); Jonotan (live)
- Past members: John Tonks; Anschul

CirKus are a trip hop band formed by Burt Ford (Cameron McVey), Karmil (aka Matt Kent), Lolita Moon and Neneh Cherry.

== History ==
DJ and producer Karmil was recruited by Burt Ford (Neneh's husband Cameron McVey) as an assistant recording engineer. They began to work on their own material at Karmil's home studio in London. Ford was singing, then Karmil's girlfriend Lolita Moon (Neneh and Cameron's daughter Tyson) was asked to sing on some tracks. Eventually Neneh Cherry joined the team and performed rapped/sung vocals. Ford and Karmil convinced Cherry to move to Sweden and the band settled in Cherry's country house near Malmö and recorded their first album Laylow, released in 2006. They are currently based between Stockholm and London.

Laylow received negative reviews from the BBC, stating it as "mostly uninspired and smoothed to an unpleasant sheen."

The group released a second album, Medicine, in France in March 2009.

== Discography ==
=== Studio albums ===
| Title | Album details | Peak chart positions |
| Title | Album details | FRA |
|---|---|---|
| Laylow | Release date: 2006; Label: Wagram (#3118062); Formats: LP, CD | 95 |
| Medicine | Release date: 9 March 2009; Label: Wagram (#3141012); Formats: CD | 110 |

== Instruments used on stage ==
- Burt plays: Novation X-Station and Kaoss Pad 2
- Lolita plays: Roland V-Synth (with its D-Beam system that allows her to control some parameters with her hand) and Akai MPC
- Karmil plays: Blueridge sunburst dreadnought acoustic guitar (Contemporary Series), Gibson Les Paul standard and a Patrick Eggle Berlin Pro V.
- Both guitar and bass use line 6 pods.
- Ableton Live is used to run triggered drum loops and samples

== See also ==
- Neneh Cherry discography
