= Manchild (Neneh Cherry song) =

1989 single by Neneh Cherry

Single by Neneh Cherry

from the album Raw Like Sushi
- B-side: "Phoney Ladies" (US)
- Released: 8 May 1989
- Studio: Abbey Road, Blackwing, Eastcote, Hot Nights, Sam Therapy (London, England)
- Genre: Hip hop; dance-pop
- Length: 3:52
- Label: Virgin; Circa
- Songwriters: Neneh Cherry; 3D-Del Naja; Cameron "Booga Bear" McVey
- Producers: The Bubble Bunch; Cameron "Booga Bear" McVey

Neneh Cherry singles chronology
"Buffalo Stance" (1988)	"Manchild" (1989)	"Kisses on the Wind" (1989)

Music video
- "Manchild" on YouTube

"Manchild" is a song by Swedish singer-songwriter Neneh Cherry, released in May 1989 by Virgin and Circa Records as the second single from her debut album, Raw Like Sushi (1989). It was the first song Cherry wrote; she composed it on a Casio keyboard using an auto-chord setting and ended up with seven chords in the verse alone. Neneh's stepfather Don Cherry commented on this positively, comparing it to a jazz song structure. Nellee Hooper created the beat for the song and wrote the rap with Robert Del Naja. Cherry then gave the track to her future husband, Cameron McVey, who helped to shape the song with the parts and "made it make sense".

The song's lyrics are "directed at a full-grown man who has a little more growing up to do". Cherry expressed the significance of the song for herself, stating it is where she found her sound: "I think "Manchild" was the song where I kind of found my style. I think that song, the style of the song, the spirit and the feeling of the song has reappeared; it always reappears along the way in other songs that I've written; therefore it became the most significant song that I ever wrote, in a way". Commercially, "Manchild" was a top-10 success in the United Kingdom, New Zealand, and several European countries, but it did not chart in the United States or Canada. The accompanying music video for "Manchild", directed by Jean-Baptiste Mondino, was nominated for "Best Video" at the 1990 Brit Awards.

== Reception ==
=== Critical reception ===
The Los Angeles Times wrote about the song and its music video, "Nothing less than one of the most visually arresting video clips ever produced, illustrating one of 1989's truly great singles, an accusatory yet compassionate balladic broadside." Mark Lepage from Montreal Gazette felt it "has a graceful sweep". A reviewer from Music & Media described "Manchild" as "slower and more melodic" than "Buffalo Stance", declaring it as "a strong and highly commercial follow-up with a warm production." Jerry Smith from Music Week complimented it as "a simple but highly effective ballad, sure to give her another hit. It's not as immediate but instead has a chorus with a hook that really bites deep after a few plays." Sylvia Patterson from Smash Hits named it Single of the Fortnight, saying, "It's nothing like her last single, the stoating "Buffalo Stance", even though there's a few mean rappin' blethers in it but it's the chorus that curdles your windpipe. There's loads of floaty "pshoooo!!" noises and curious keyboard wizardries and it's highly creepy and mesmerising and makes you go all funny in the head."

=== Retrospective response ===
In a 2009 review of Raw Like Sushi, Angus Taylor for BBC noted, that the "offbeat, ambient ballad 'Manchild' showcases Cherry's maternal side". In 2014, Lesley Chow from The Quietus wrote,

The title character is a guy with a run-down car, a cheating girlfriend and no willpower, so it's not surprising that we get a hypnotic sense of draining away. The strings have a repetitive, droning sound; they move gradually up or down a tone, so that the entire song seems to be slipping down a slope. A program of beats forms a continually revolving and reversing pattern, and the track feels as if it's shuffling or rotating by degrees (the video ingeniously matched this idea of constant slippage by showing Cherry surrounded by tilting levels of water). However, what's elating is the way that the song repeatedly threatens to lose its motor – and then regains it, by a whisker. All that downward movement should lead to a dead end, but just before momentum runs out, the vocal lifts to even out and stabilize the track. The lyrics are self-reflexive; the phrase "Turn around, ask yourself" is used as a pivot, a chance for the song to do a 180-degree turn.

== Music video ==
The music video for "Manchild" was produced by French fashion photographer and music video director Jean-Baptiste Mondino. It shows Cherry on a virtual beach, while several other people can be seen in the background. Cherry's daughters, Naima and Tyson, and her step-son, Marlon Roudette, also appear in the video. The camera "slowly rocks back and forth" in line with the beat of the song. It was nominated for "Best Video" at the 1990 Brit Awards and later made available on Cherry's official YouTube channel in 2009.

- Woman in the black dress – Andi Oliver
- Man in the gold hat – Barry Kamen
- Man in the black hat – Judy Blame
- Girl on the swing – Naima Karlsson
- Boy jumping in puddles – Marlon Roudette
- Baby – Tyson McVey

== Track listings ==
- Non-US 7-inch single

A. "Manchild" – 3:52
B. "Manchild" (the original mix) – 4:44

- 12-inch single

A1. "Manchild" (the Old School mix) – 5:32
B1. "Manchild" (the original mix) – 4:44
B2. "Buffalo Stance" (the There's Nothing Wrong mix – Sukka mix II) – 5:36

- European mini-CD and maxi-CD single
1. "Manchild" (radio edit)
2. "Manchild" (the Old School mix)
3. "Buffalo Stance" (the There's Nothing Wrong mix – Sukka mix II)
- UK 12-inch remix single

A1. "Manchild" (Massive Attack remix) – 5:24
A2. "Manchild" (Massive Attack Bonus Beats) – 0:55
B1. "Manchild" (Smith & Mighty remix) – 4:39
B2. "Manchild" (Smith & Mighty More Bass – Less Vocal Style) – 4:39

- UK cassette single
1. "Manchild" (the Old School mix)
2. "Buffalo Stance" (the There's Nothing Wrong mix – Sukka mix II)
- US 7-inch and cassette single
1. "Manchild" (edit) – 3:51
2. "Phoney Ladies" – 3:53

== Charts ==
=== Weekly charts ===
Chart (1989)	Peak position
Australia (ARIA)	58
Austria (Ö3 Austria Top 40)	6
Belgium (Ultratop 50 Flanders)	10
Denmark (IFPI)	5
Europe (Eurochart Hot 100)	4
Finland (Suomen virallinen lista)	15
France (SNEP)	41
Ireland (IRMA)	12
Luxembourg (Radio Luxembourg)	4
Netherlands (Dutch Top 40)	3
Netherlands (Single Top 100)	3
New Zealand (Recorded Music NZ)	4
Sweden (Sverigetopplistan)	7
Switzerland (Schweizer Hitparade)	4
UK Singles (Official Charts)	5
West Germany (GfK)	2

=== Year-end charts ===
Chart (1989)	Position
Belgium (Ultratop)	89
Europe (Eurochart Hot 100)	42
Netherlands (Dutch Top 40)	26
Netherlands (Single Top 100)	32
New Zealand (RIANZ)	26
Switzerland (Schweizer Hitparade)	14
West Germany (Media Control)	25

== Sia version ==
"Manchild"

Promotional single by Neneh Cherry and Sia

from the album The Versions
- Released: 28 April 2022
- Length: 3:17
- Label: EMI
- Songwriters: Neneh Cherry; 3D-Del Naja; Cameron "Booga Bear" McVey
- Producer: Jesse Shatkin

Neneh Cherry and Sia singles chronology
"Fly Me To The Moon" (2021)	"Manchild" (2022)

Lyric video
- "Manchild (Neneh Cherry Cover)" on YouTube

In April 2022, Australian singer Sia released a version as a promotional single from Cherry's sixth studio album The Versions, released in June of the same year.
