= Kisses on the Wind =

1989 single by Neneh Cherry

Single by Neneh Cherry

from the album Raw Like Sushi
- B-side: "Buffalo Blues"
- Released: 1989
- Studio: Matrix (London, England)
- Length: 3:57
- Label: Virgin; Circa
- Songwriters: Neneh Cherry; Cameron "Booga Bear" McVey
- Producers: The Dynamik Duo; Nick Plytas

Neneh Cherry singles chronology
"Manchild" (1989)	"Kisses on the Wind" (1989)	"Heart" / "Inna City Mamma" (1989)

Music video
- "Kisses on the Wind" on YouTube

"Kisses on the Wind" is a song by Swedish singer-songwriter Neneh Cherry, released in 1989 by Circa and Virgin Records as the third single from her debut album, Raw Like Sushi (1989). Cherry co-wrote the song with Cameron McVey, and it was produced by The Dynamik Duo and Nick Plytas. Like many songs on the album, "Kisses on the Wind" refers to Cherry's schooldays; the song is about a girl who matures before the other girls do, and as a result, she is the first to draw boys' attention. It peaked within the top 10 in Finland, New Zealand, and Switzerland and just reached the top 20 in the United Kingdom, peaking at number 20. In the United States, it peaked at number eight on the Billboard Hot 100.

"Kisses on the Wind" is one of many songs containing the sample "What we're gonna do right here is go back, way back, back into time" from the intro of the 1972 single "Troglodyte" by the Jimmy Castor Bunch.

== Critical reception ==
Angus Taylor for BBC wrote in a retrospective review, that the "Cuban-tinged" song's autobiographical words "give an intriguing insight into a young girl who wanted to be remembered for more than just her incredible looks." Upon the release, Bill Coleman from Billboard magazine described it as a "Latin- tinged pop narrative complete with Cherry's spunk, humor, and knack for telling it like it really is." A reviewer from Music & Media named it a good choice as the follow-up to "Manchild", and "probably the most commercial track" from her debut album.

David Giles from Music Week complimented it as "precocious", adding that the song isn't as strong as her previous two singles, "but should still follow them into the top 10." He noted that "Kisses on the Wind" "begins with an outburst in Spanish and locks into a naked, sparse groove like a soul number with the bottom removed." Lesley Chow from The Quietus declared it as "a paean to a girl whose breeziness enchants the young neighbourhood boys. Her presence is reflected in the salsa rhythm, Spanish dialogue and the flowing feel of the whole song. The melody keeps billowing upwards (More like a woman, she walks like one) and is thus subtly suggestive of the female shape."

== Track listings ==
- Non-US 7-inch and cassette single
1. "Kisses on the Wind" (radio edit) – 3:40
2. "Buffalo Blues" – 4:20
- European and Australian 12-inch single; European maxi-CD single
1. "Kisses on the Wind" (A Little More Puerto Rican) – 7:15
2. "Kisses on the Wind" (extended album version) – 5:07
3. "Buffalo Blues" – 4:20
- UK 12-inch remix single and CD single
1. "Kisses on the Wind" (the Dynamik Duo remix) – 6:53
2. "Kisses on the Wind" (For All You Serious Clubbers Out There with Love from the Dynamik Duo & the Latin Rascals – Dub Wise) – 6:49
3. "Kisses on the Wind" (the Dynamik radio remix) – 3:23
- US and Canadian 12-inch single

A1. "Kisses on the Wind" (English 12-inch mix) – 7:15
A2. "Kisses on the Wind" (Spanish 12-inch mix) – 7:15
A3. "Kisses on the Wind" (house dub) – 6:24
B1. "Kisses on the Wind" (street mix) – 5:07
B2. "Kisses on the Wind" (Moody mix) – 6:47
B3. "Kisses on the Wind" (bass dub) – 6:00
B4. "Buffalo Blues" – 4:20

- US and Canadian 7-inch single
1. "Kisses on the Wind" (LP version) – 3:49
2. "Buffalo Blues" – 4:20
- US and Canadian cassette single

A1. "Kisses on the Wind" (edit) – 3:25
A2. "Buffalo Blues" – 4:20
B1. "Kisses on the Wind" (LP version) – 3:49
B2. "Buffalo Blues" – 4:20

- Japanese maxi-CD single
1. "Kisses on the Wind" (A Little More Puerto Rican)
2. "Manchild" (the Old School mix)
3. "Buffalo Stance" (12-inch mix)
4. "Inna City Mama"

== Charts ==
Chart (1989)	Peak position
Australia (ARIA)	63
Belgium (Ultratop 50 Flanders)	23
Canada (The Record)	20
Canada Top Singles (RPM)	17
Canada Dance/Urban (RPM)	5
Canada Retail Singles (RPM)	14
Europe (Eurochart Hot 100)	33
Finland (Suomen virallinen lista)	4
Ireland (IRMA)	13
Luxembourg (Radio Luxembourg)	16
Netherlands (Dutch Top 40)	14
Netherlands (Single Top 100)	14
New Zealand (Recorded Music NZ)	8
Switzerland (Schweizer Hitparade)	9
UK Singles (Official Charts)	20
US Billboard Hot 100	8
US Dance Club Songs (Billboard)	19
US Dance Singles Sales (Billboard)	9
West Germany (GfK)	23

== Release history ==
Region	Date	Format(s)	Label(s)	Ref.
United States	1989	7-inch vinyl; 12-inch vinyl; cassette	Virgin	
Europe	31 July 1989	7-inch vinyl; CD	Circa; Virgin	
Japan	21 February 1990	CD	Circa; Virgin	
