= Man (Neneh Cherry album) =

Studio album by Neneh Cherry
- Released: 2 September 1996
- Recorded: June 1994–April 1996
- Studio: CTS, Eastcote, Mayfair, Roundhouse, Westside (London); Coin Record, El Cortijo (Málaga, Spain); Power Play (Long Island, New York); Soundtrade (Stockholm)
- Genre: Worldbeat; hip hop; alternative rock
- Length: 48:18
- Label: Hut; Virgin
- Producer: Dave Allen; Booga Bear; Jonny Dollar; Simon Richmond; Mark Saunders

Neneh Cherry chronology
Homebrew (1992)	Man (1996)	Cherry Remixes (1997)

Singles from Man
- 1. "Woman" Released: 22 July 1996; 2. "Kootchi" Released: 21 October 1996 (Europe); 3. "Feel It" Released: 27 January 1997

Professional ratings
Review scores
Source	Rating
AllMusic	3/5 stars
The Encyclopedia of Popular Music	3/5 stars
Muzik	3.5/5 stars

Man is the third solo studio album by Swedish singer Neneh Cherry, released on 2 September 1996 by Hut Records and Virgin Records.

Three singles were issued from the album, "Woman", "Kootchi", and "Feel It".

Preceding the album release, a duet with Youssou N'Dour called "7 Seconds" was released as a single to promote the Senegalese singer's studio album The Guide (Wommat). Almost two years later, the track was also added to Cherry's album.

The album includes two cover songs: "Trouble Man" by Marvin Gaye, which was included in the 1995 compilation Inner City Blues: The Music of Marvin Gaye; and "Golden Ring", a song by the band American Gypsy.

== Track listing ==
No.	Title	Writer(s)	Producer(s)	Length
1.	"Woman"	Neneh Cherry; Cameron McVey; Jonathan Sharp	Booga Bear; Jonny Dollar; Dave Allen^{[a]}; Wil Malone^{[a]}	4:30
2.	"Feel It"	Cherry; McVey; Sharp	Booga Bear; Jonny Dollar; Allen^{[a]}	5:41
3.	"Hornbeam"	Cherry; McVey; Steve Hopwood	Booga Bear; Allen; Jonny Dollar^{[a]}	5:02
4.	"Trouble Man"	Marvin Gaye	Booga Bear; Mark Saunders	3:57
5.	"Golden Ring"	Steve Douglas; Joe Skeete	Booga Bear; Saunders; Rudi Lagrilliere^{[a]}	3:40
6.	"7 Seconds" (featuring Youssou N'Dour)	Cherry; McVey; Sharp; N'Dour	Booga Bear; Jonny Dollar; Falcon^{[a]}	4:59
7.	"Kootchi"	Cherry; McVey; Hopwood; Cia Berg	Booga Bear; Allen; Jonny Dollar^{[a]}	5:06
8.	"Beastiality"	Cherry; McVey; Hopwood	Booga Bear; Allen	2:49
9.	"Carry Me"	Cherry; McVey; Hopwood; Simon Richmond	Booga Bear; Richmond; Allen	4:22
10.	"Together Now"	Cherry; Tricky; Saunders	Tricky; Saunders	3:11
11.	"Everything"	Cherry; McVey; Sharp	Booga Bear; Johnny Dollar	4:58

=== Notes ===
- ^{^[a]} signifies an additional producer

== Personnel ==
- Neneh Cherry – vocals
- Cameron McVey – Producer, beats, drums, keyboards
- Louis Pavlou – percussion, drums on "Kootchi"
- Gavyn Wright – string arrangements
- Mark Saunders – programming
- Wil Malone – string arrangements
- Jonny Stephens – electric guitar, Casio
- Steve "Grippa" Hopwood – guitar, backing vocals
- Jonny Dollar – guitar, programming, beats, string arrangements
- Paul Anthony Taylor – programming
- Youssou N'Dour – vocals on "7 Seconds"
- Christian "Falcon" Falk – producer, programming on "7 Seconds"
- Jonas Lindgren – violin on "7 Seconds"
- Kristoffer Wallman – keyboards on "7 Seconds"
- Bernard Butler – guitar on "Woman"
- Mickey P. Petralia – beats on "Woman"
- Mike Thompson – French horn on "Woman"
- Jeff Bryant – French horn on "Woman"
- Bill McDonald – bass, rhythm guitar, vocals on "Kootchi"
- Rich King – guitar on "Kootchi"
- Eagle-Eye Cherry – piano on "Trouble Man"
- Makoto Sakamoto – drums on "Hornbeam"
- Rudi Lagrilliere – guitar on "Golden Ring"

== Charts ==
=== Weekly charts ===
Weekly chart performance for Man
Chart (1996)	Peak position
Australian Albums (ARIA)	10
Austrian Albums (Ö3 Austria)	5
Belgian Albums (Ultratop Flanders)	12
Belgian Albums (Ultratop Wallonia)	8
Dutch Albums (Album Top 100)	22
European Albums (Music & Media)	8
French Albums (SNEP)	4
German Albums (Offizielle Top 100)	20
New Zealand Albums (RMNZ)	23
Norwegian Albums (VG-lista)	19
Scottish Albums (OCC)	31
Spanish Albums (AFYVE)	22
Swedish Albums (Sverigetopplistan)	22
Swiss Albums (Schweizer Hitparade)	5
UK Albums (OCC)	16

=== Year-end charts ===
Year-end chart performance for Man
Chart (1996)	Position
European Albums (Music & Media)	81
Swiss Albums (Schweizer Hitparade)	49

== Certifications ==
Certifications for Man
Region	Certification	Certified units/sales
Switzerland (IFPI Switzerland)	Gold	25,000^{^}
United Kingdom (BPI)	Silver	60,000^{^}
^{^} Shipments figures based on certification alone.
