= Raw Like Sushi =

Studio album by Neneh Cherry
- Released: 5 June 1989
- Recorded: September 1988–January 1989
- Studios: Abbey Road, Battery, Blackwing, Cherry Bear, Eastcote, Hot Nights, Matrix, Power Plant, Sam Therapy (London); Slam City (New York City)
- Genres: Hip hop; new jack swing; R&B
- Length: 46:11 (vinyl); 67:22 (CD)
- Label: Virgin
- Producers: Jonny Dollar; Cameron McVey; Mark Saunders; Tim Simenon

Neneh Cherry chronology
| Raw Like Sushi (1989) | Homebrew (1992) |

Singles from Raw Like Sushi
- 1. "Buffalo Stance" Released: 28 November 1988; 2. "Manchild" Released: 8 May 1989; 3. "Kisses on the Wind" Released: 31 July 1989 (UK); 4. "Heart" Released: November 1989 (US); 5. "Inna City Mama" Released: 11 December 1989

Raw Like Sushi is the debut studio album by Swedish musician Neneh Cherry, released 5 June 1989 by Virgin Records. The album includes the commercially successful single "Buffalo Stance".

== Background ==
An early version of "Buffalo Stance" appeared on the B-side of the 1986 Stock Aitken Waterman-produced Morgan-McVey single, "Looking Good Diving", titled "Looking Good Diving with the Wild Bunch". The single was not successful; however, the B-side was re-recorded with Tim Simenon of Bomb the Bass, and became the version of "Buffalo Stance" that was a worldwide hit, reaching No. 3 in the UK Singles Chart, No. 3 on the Billboard Hot 100 and No. 1 in the Netherlands and Sweden. The album also contains the No. 8 US (and No. 20 UK) hit "Kisses on the Wind", and the No. 5 UK hit "Manchild".

All musicians and programmers are credited in the album sleeve, however Cameron McVey, Cherry's husband, is credited as "Booga Bear". Massive Attack's Robert Del Naja co-wrote "Manchild", and fellow member Andrew Vowles aka DJ Mushroom performs on "Kisses on the Wind", "The Next Generation" and "So Here I Come". "My Bitch" is a vocal duet with Gilly G.

The cover and inner photos were shot by fashion photographer Jean-Baptiste Mondino.

== Music ==
Raw Like Sushi is distinctive for its eclectic mix of genres, incorporating influences from across the trends of 1980s pop music. Cherry sings and raps accompanied by a diverse set of sounds, including pianos, synthesizers, brass instruments, guitars, and go-go percussion. The album's lyrical themes are influenced by Cherry's experiences of motherhood, and her education and upbringing.

When it was released, the album was favorably compared to Madonna and Prince, though it did not reach similar popularity.

== Reception ==
Professional ratings
Review scores
| Source | Rating |
|---|---|
| AllMusic | 4.5/5 stars |
| Chicago Tribune | 3/4 stars |
| Los Angeles Times | 4/5 stars |
| Mojo | 5/5 stars |
| NME | 9/10 |
| Pitchfork | 8.0/10 |
| Q | 4/5 stars |
| Rolling Stone | 4/5 stars |
| Spin Alternative Record Guide | 9/10 |
| The Village Voice | A− |

NME critic David Quantick praised Raw Like Sushi as "the sort of record you can rarely buy – immediate, commercial pop that only someone with a rather individual worldview could have made", highlighting its unconventional song structures and Cherry's "wit, intelligence and even maturity." Selina Webb of British music newspaper Music Week called it "eclectic, wholesome, a subtly teasing collection of provoking yet pouting songs", "a confident manifesto from refreshing new pop diva." Pete Clark of Hi-Fi News & Record Review said that Cherry's music "is illuminated by a jazzy delight in non-conformity" and singled out "effortlessly memorable" "Buffalo Stance" and "Manchild". As per Chris Murray of RPM "this package contains something for any contemporary dance music fan."

Raw Like Sushi is included in the book 1001 Albums You Must Hear Before You Die.

== Track listing ==
All tracks are written by Neneh Cherry and Cameron McVey (Booga Bear), except where noted.

Side one
| No. | Title | Writer(s) | Length |
|---|---|---|---|
| 1. | "Buffalo Stance" | Jamie J. Morgan; McVey; Cherry; Phillip Ramacon | 5:42 |
| 2. | "Manchild" | McVey; Cherry; Robert "3D" Del Naja | 3:51 |
| 3. | "Kisses on the Wind" | | 3:57 |
| 4. | "Inna City Mamma" | McVey; Cherry; Phillip Gibbs | 4:50 |
| 5. | "The Next Generation" | | 5:04 |

Side two
| No. | Title | Writer(s) | Length |
|---|---|---|---|
| 6. | "Love Ghetto" | | 4:27 |
| 7. | "Heart" | | 5:08 |
| 8. | "Phoney Ladies" | | 3:52 |
| 9. | "Outré Risqué Locomotive" | McVey; Cherry; Will Malone | 5:04 |
| 10. | "So Here I Come" | McVey; Cherry; Bryan Roberts | 4:02 |
| Total length: | | | 46:10 |

UK/Germany CD bonus tracks
| No. | Title | Writer(s) | Length |
|---|---|---|---|
| 11. | "My Bitch" | Cherry; Chill; Gilly G; Leroy Smart | 5:26 |
| 12. | "Heart" (It's a Demo) | | 4:52 |
| 13. | "Buffalo Stance" (Sukka Mix) | Morgan; McVey; Cherry; Ramacon | 5:20 |
| 14. | "Manchild" (The Old School Mix) | McVey; Cherry; Del Naja | 5:30 |
| Total length: | | | 67:23 |

30th Anniversary Edition bonus tracks
| No. | Title | Writer(s) | Length |
|---|---|---|---|
| 11. | "My Bitch" | Cherry; Chill; Gilly G; Leroy Smart | 5:26 |
| 12. | "Heart" (It's a Demo) | | 4:52 |
| Total length: | | | 56:32 |

30th Anniversary Deluxe Edition disc 2
| No. | Title | Writer(s) | Length |
|---|---|---|---|
| 1. | "Buffalo Stance" (Sukka Mix) | Morgan; McVey; Cherry; Ramacon | 5:24 |
| 2. | "Buffalo Stance" (Electro Ski Mix) | Morgan; McVey; Cherry; Ramacon | 3:35 |
| 3. | "Buffalo Stance" (½ Way 2 House) | Morgan; McVey; Cherry; Ramacon | 7:42 |
| 4. | "Buffalo Stance" (Nearly Neue Beat) | Morgan; McVey; Cherry; Ramacon | 7:03 |
| 5. | "Buffalo Stance" (Kevin Sanderson’s Techno Stance Remix One) | Morgan; McVey; Cherry; Ramacon | 6:39 |
| 6. | "Manchild" (Old School Mix) | McVey; Cherry; Del Naja | 5:33 |
| 7. | "Manchild" (Massive Attack Remix) | McVey; Cherry; Del Naja | 5:25 |
| 8. | "Manchild" (Massive Attack Bonus Beats) | McVey; Cherry; Del Naja | 0:58 |
| 9. | "Manchild" (Smith n Mighty Remix) | McVey; Cherry; Del Naja | 4:50 |
| 10. | "Manchild" (Smith n Mighty More Bass - Less Vocal Style) | McVey; Cherry; Del Naja | 4:41 |

30th Anniversary Deluxe Edition disc 3
| No. | Title | Writer(s) | Length |
|---|---|---|---|
| 1. | "Inna City Mamma" (re-recorded extended version) | McVey; Cherry; Gibbs | 6:31 |
| 2. | "Inna City Mamma" (Cold Blooded Remix) | McVey; Cherry; Gibbs | 5:51 |
| 3. | "Kisses on the Wind" (12" Spanish mix) | | 7:18 |
| 4. | "Kisses on the Wind" (David Morales "A Little More Puerto Rico" mix)) | | 7:19 |
| 5. | "Kisses on the Wind" (Dynamic Duo + Latin Rascals mix) | | 6:49 |
| 6. | "Kisses on the Wind" (Lovers Hip-Hop extended version) | | 5:09 |
| 7. | "The Next Generation" (Rap One mix) | | 5:43 |
| 8. | "The Next Generation" (Sub-Woofer mix) | | 5:11 |
| 9. | "Heart" (club mix) | | 4:57 |

== Personnel ==
- Neneh Cherry – lead vocals, programming
- Sandy McLelland – backing vocals on "Inna City Mamma", "Love Ghetto" and "Phoney Ladies"
- Chandra Armstead – backing vocals on "Outré Risqué Locomotive"
- Eagle-Eye Cherry – toasting on "Heart"
- Sarah Erde – Hispanic vocals on "Kisses on the Wind"
- Cameron "Booga Bear" McVey – backing vocals, executive producer, mixing, beats on "Manchild"
- Phil Chill – programming, beats, backing vocals on "The Next Generation"
- Claudia Fontaine – backing vocals on "Kisses on the Wind"
- Nellee Hooper – vibraphone
- Jerod Minnies – guitar on "Love Ghetto"
- Alvin Moody – beats and programming on "Outré Risqué Locomotive"
- Nick Plytas – programming
- Jeff Scantlebury – congas on "Kisses on the Wind"
- John Sharp – programming on "Manchild"
- Tim Simenon – beats and turntables on "Buffalo Stance" and "Heart"
- Dynamik Duo – beats
- Mark Saunders – multi-instruments, beats on "Buffalo Stance"
- Wil Malone – conductor, programming, string arrangements on "Manchild", backing vocals
- Gordon Dukes – backing vocals on "Outré Risqué Locomotive"
- Mushroom – programming, turntables on "Kisses on the Wind", "The Next Generation" and "So Here I Come"

Technical

- Jean-Baptiste Mondino – photography

== Charts ==
=== Weekly charts ===
1989 weekly chart performance for Raw Like Sushi
| Chart (1989) | Peak position |
|---|---|
| Australian Albums (ARIA) | 30 |
| Austrian Albums (Ö3 Austria) | 7 |
| Canada Top Albums/CDs (RPM) | 34 |
| Dutch Albums (Album Top 100) | 11 |
| European Albums (Music & Media) | 7 |
| Finnish Albums (Suomen virallinen lista) | 14 |
| French Albums (SNEP) | 35 |
| German Albums (Offizielle Top 100) | 10 |
| New Zealand Albums (RMNZ) | 9 |
| Swedish Albums (Sverigetopplistan) | 3 |
| Swiss Albums (Schweizer Hitparade) | 6 |
| UK Albums (Official Charts) | 2 |
| US Billboard 200 | 40 |
| US Top R&B/Hip-Hop Albums (Billboard) | 62 |

2020 weekly chart performance for Raw Like Sushi
| Chart (2020) | Peak position |
|---|---|
| Belgian Albums (Ultratop Flanders) | 89 |
| Belgian Albums (Ultratop Wallonia) | 133 |

=== Year-end charts ===
Year-end chart performance for Raw Like Sushi
| Chart (1989) | Position |
|---|---|
| Canada Top Albums/CDs (RPM) | 70 |
| Dutch Albums (Album Top 100) | 56 |
| European Albums (Music & Media) | 41 |
| German Albums (Offizielle Top 100) | 42 |
| New Zealand Albums (RMNZ) | 41 |
| Swiss Albums (Schweizer Hitparade) | 19 |
| UK Albums (Gallup) | 28 |

== Certifications and sales ==
Certifications and sales for Raw Like Sushi
| Region | Certification | Certified units/sales |
|---|---|---|
| Canada (Music Canada) | Gold | 50,000^{^} |
| Netherlands (NVPI) | Gold | 50,000^{^} |
| Sweden (GLF) | Gold | 50,000^{^} |
| Switzerland (IFPI Switzerland) | Gold | 25,000^{^} |
| United Kingdom (BPI) | Platinum | 300,000^{^} |
Summaries
| Worldwide | — | 2,000,000 |
^{^} Shipments figures based on certification alone.
