= Looking Good Diving =

Single by Morgan-McVey
- B-side: "Looking Good Diving with the Wild Bunch" featuring Neneh Cherry
- Released: 2 February 1987
- Label: Sony
- Songwriters: Jamie Morgan, Cameron McVey, Stock Aitken Waterman
- Producer: Stock Aitken Waterman

"Looking Good Diving" is a 1987 song performed by Morgan-McVey, who were vocalists Jamie Morgan and Cameron McVey. It was their only single. The track was released through Sony Records in 1987, and was produced by Stock Aitken Waterman (SAW) and mixed by Phil Harding. The track's B-side, "Looking Good Diving with the Wild Bunch", featured Neneh Cherry on vocals, and was a tribute to the 'buffalo stance', a type of pose.

According to Morgan, SAW closely followed the structure of the band's initial demo of the track, notably keeping the distinctive Phil Ramacon keyboard hook. He denies that the song is about cunnilingus, instead insisting it is about looking good while striving to impress a love interest.

"Looking Good Diving with the Wild Bunch" was re-recorded by Cherry in 1988 and released as her debut solo single, "Buffalo Stance". "Buffalo Stance" peaked at No. 3 on the UK chart, and achieved similar success around the world.

== Background ==
Band members Morgan and McVey had a background in fashion photography, video direction and modelling. Morgan had been influential as part of Buffalo, a styling team whose streetwise look was prominent in British style magazines of the time.

The act was originally conceived as a Simon & Garfunkel-style male vocal duo who would harmonise over reggae beats, but early demos failed to deliver on the concept. Facing creative inertia, their record company convinced them to work with then-rising pop producers SAW, a proposition that left them with mixed feelings.

== Critical reception ==
Wayne Hussey of Smash Hits panned the song he described as "just horrible pop music – pointless", and stated that in his point of view McVey should change his name and stop to record songs.

== Legacy ==
Morgan says "Looking Good Diving" left McVey "embarrassed", and the band disintegrated as McVey favoured working with his future wife, Cherry.

After the duo split, Morgan would go on to release a cover of "Walk on the Wild Side", which peaked at number 27 on the UK Singles Chart in 1990, whilst McVey would go on to produce for electronic acts Massive Attack and Portishead and pop acts like All Saints and Sugababes.

== Music video ==
The music video for "Looking Good Diving" features the duo with Neneh Cherry on guitar and Naomi Campbell on the keyboard. Morgan says both he and McVey were left deeply embarrassed by the video, but he feels it has now become iconic as a "so naff and so 80s video" that is now seen as "so bad it's good". However, in the immediate aftermath of the single release, McVey became so consumed by his embarrassment, he abandoned the act to work with future wife Cherry.

== Track listing ==
1. "Looking Good Diving" (Morgan, McVey, Stock Aitken Waterman)
2. "Looking Good Diving with the Wild Bunch" featuring Neneh Cherry (Morgan, McVey, Cherry) (remixed by The Wild Bunch)

== Covers ==
The song was covered by Nick Kamen for his 1990 album Move Until We Fly.
