= Jonny Dollar =

Record producer and songwriter

- Born: Jonathan Peter Sharp; 20 February 1964; Westminster, London, England
- Died: 29 May 2009 (aged 45) Chelsea, London, England
- Genres: Trip hop, pop
- Occupations: Record producer, programmer, songwriter, guitarist

Jonathan Peter Sharp (20 February 1964 – 29 May 2009), better known by the pseudonym Jonny Dollar, was an English record producer, songwriter, and one of the main architects of the trip hop genre.

Sharp was born in Westminster, London. His father was the Australian film director, Don Sharp, and his mother was British actress, Mary Steele.

Dollar first rose to prominence co-producing and co-writing the Bristol collective Massive Attack's debut album Blue Lines, composing the strings for the genre defining single "Unfinished Sympathy", which later went on to be arranged and conducted at Abbey Road by Wil Malone. Sharp's pseudonym came about during the recording of Blue Lines, where he was the only person working on the album being regularly paid. He co-produced Neneh Cherry's first three albums: Raw Like Sushi, Homebrew, and Man, and Gabrielle's third album Rise.

Having mentored Geoff Barrow, who worked as a tape mixer on Blue Lines, Dollar went on to provide early remixes for Portishead and co-wrote both the anti-racism song "7 Seconds" featuring Youssou N'Dour and Cherry, and Kylie Minogue's "Confide in Me". His later works include the Sugababes' Three, Natty's "Man Like I" and Eliza Doolittle's eponymous debut album.

He died of cancer in May 2009 at the age of 45.
