= Neneh Cherry =

Swedish singer (born 1964)

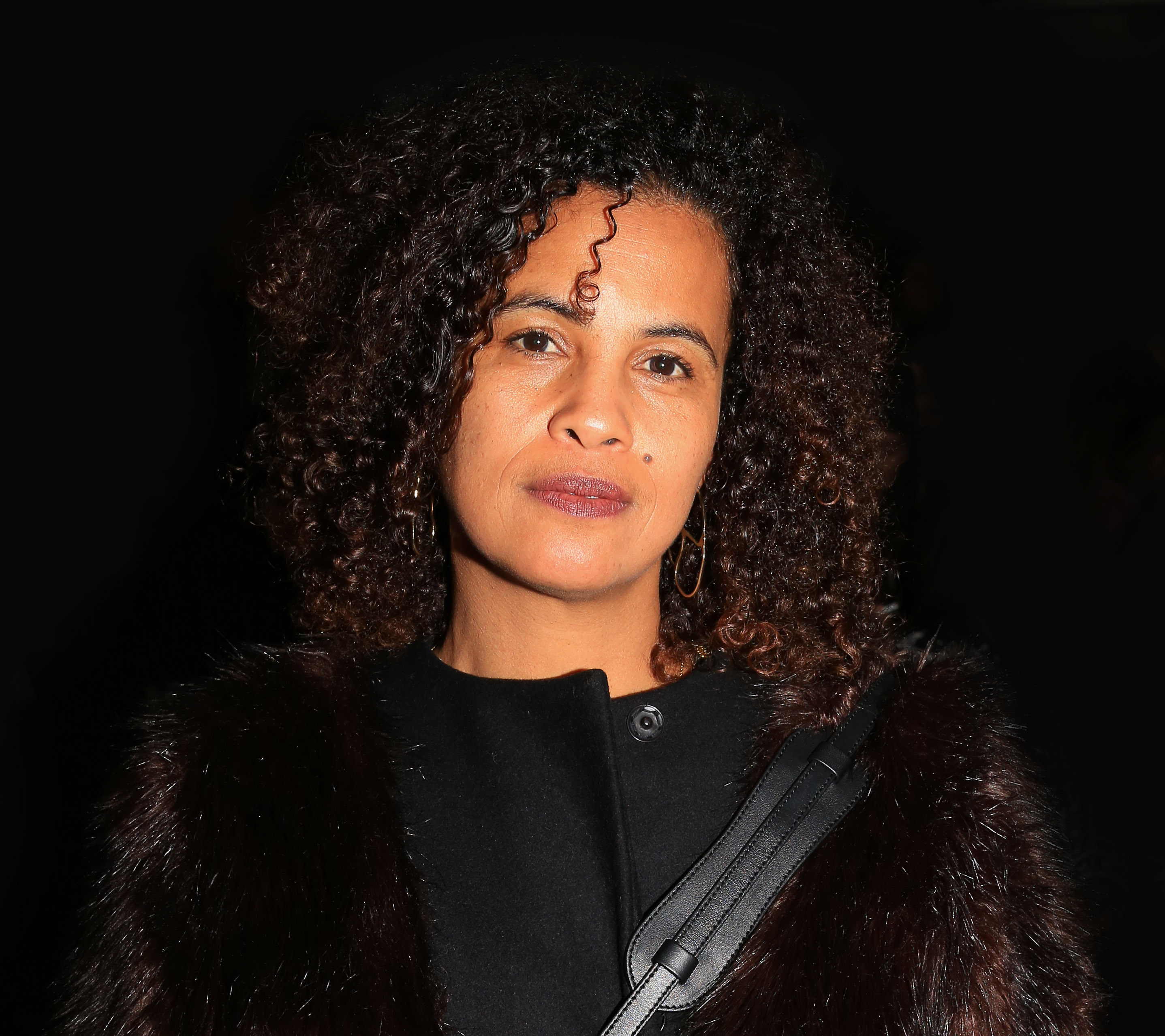
- Cherry in 2016
- Born: Neneh Mariann Karlsson; 10 March 1964 (age 62); Stockholm, Sweden
- Occupations: Singer; songwriter; rapper; disc jockey; broadcaster
- Years active: 1980–present
- Spouse(s): Bruce Smith (m. 1983; div. 1984) Cameron McVey (m. 1990)
- Children: 3, including Mabel
- Parents: Ahmadu Jah (father); Moki Cherry (mother)
- Relatives: Don Cherry (step-father); Eagle-Eye Cherry (half-brother); Tyson Mcvey (daughter)
- Musical career
- Origin: London, England
- Genres: Hip-hop; post-punk; trip hop; dance
- Instrument: Vocals
- Labels: Virgin; Smalltown Supersound

Neneh Mariann Karlsson (Swedish pronunciation: [ˈnɛ̂nːɛ marɪˈanː ˈkɑ̌ːɭsɔn]; born 10 March 1964), better known as Neneh Cherry, is a Swedish singer. Her musical career started in the early 1980s, in London, England, where she performed in a number of punk and post-punk bands in her youth, including the Slits and Rip Rig + Panic.

Cherry has released six studio albums under her own name. Her first, Raw Like Sushi, was released in 1989 and peaked at number two on the UK Albums Chart, thanks in large part to the worldwide hit single "Buffalo Stance". Her second studio album was 1992's Homebrew. Four years later she released Man (1996), with her next studio album, Blank Project, coming in 2014. Her most recent album, The Versions, was released in 2022. In addition to releasing these studio albums, she formed the band cirKus in 2006 and has collaborated with the Thing, releasing an album entitled The Cherry Thing in 2012. Cherry has won two Brit Awards and an MTV Europe Music Award (with Youssou N'Dour). She has also been nominated for a Grammy Award.

== Early life and family ==
Cherry was born Neneh Mariann Karlsson in Stockholm, Sweden, the daughter of Monika "Moki" Karlsson (1943–2009), a Swedish painter and textile artist, and the musician Ahmadu Jah (1936–2018). Jah was born in Sierra Leone, West Africa, the son of a tribal chief, and went to Stockholm to study engineering at university.

Her parents separated soon after her birth and her mother married the American jazz musician Don Cherry, who helped raise Neneh. She took her stepfather's surname. Her half-brother, musician Eagle-Eye Cherry, was born when she was four. From stepfather Don Cherry's side, she has a stepsister, violinist Jan Cherry, and a stepbrother, jazz musician David Ornette Cherry. Through her father Ahmadu Jah's marriage to Maylen Jah (née Bergström), Cherry is the half-sister of singer Titiyo and record producer Cherno Jah.

In 1970, Cherry's parents, Moki and Don Cherry, bought and converted an old Swedish schoolhouse in rural Tågarp in Landskrona. In the early 1970s, the family moved to the United States, when Don Cherry taught at Dartmouth College. They lived for a time in the Hotel Chelsea, before, in 1977, the family bought a Long Island City warehouse loft above Talking Heads members Chris Frantz and Tina Weymouth, whom they befriended.

As a child, Cherry's stepfather would have musicians over to jam, while her mother would paint the house and make clothes, costumes, and tapestries. Cherry said she would sing while her stepfather played the piano, and would often wander into neighbours' apartments with her brother to hear them playing music.

Cherry dropped out of school at the age of 14 and moved to London, England, in the late 1970s. Aged 15, she met the Slits while joining her stepfather on his tour with them, and moved into a squat in Battersea with bandmember Ari Up. Her first job at Better Badges involved making pin badges and zines. She also helped staple copies of the first issue of I-D magazine.

== Music career ==
=== Early career ===
Cherry moved to the United Kingdom in the midst of the punk era, where she says she found "her people". Cherry met Tessa Pollitt, Viv Albertine and Ari Up from the Slits as her stepfather, Don Cherry, was touring with them and took the 15-year-old Neneh along. She and Ari lived in a squat in Battersea, while the band invited Don Cherry to tour with them, Prince Hammer, and Creation Rebel.

In London, Cherry joined the punk rock band the Cherries. She moved through several bands, including the Slits, New Age Steppers, Rip Rig + Panic, and Float Up CP. She also DJ'd, playing early rap music on the reggae pirate Dread Broadcasting Corporation, based in West London. Cherry has stated that she found her voice singing along with Poly Styrene from X-Ray Spex.

=== Albums ===
==== Raw Like Sushi ====
Cherry began a solo career in 1982 with "Stop the War", a protest song about the Falklands War. She worked with Jonny Dollar, the The and Cameron McVey (a.k.a. Booga Bear), who co-wrote most of her 1989 debut album Raw Like Sushi, and whom she later married. She was intimately involved in the Bristol Urban Culture scene, working as an arranger on Massive Attack's Blue Lines album, through which she met Dollar. Both Robert Del Naja and Andrew Vowles of Massive Attack contributed to Raw Like Sushi.

The single "Buffalo Stance" eventually peaked at number 3 on the UK Singles Chart and the US Billboard Hot 100, and number 1 on the US Dance chart. More singles released between 1988 and 1990 included "Manchild", "Kisses on the Wind", "Heart", and "Inna City Mama". She also found success with "I've Got You Under My Skin", a reworking of the Cole Porter song, which appeared on the Red Hot + Blue AIDS fundraising album. The single reached number 25 in the UK. Cherry was nominated for a Grammy Award in 1990 in the Best New Artist category (but lost to Milli Vanilli who eventually had their award revoked). She won a Brit Award in 1990 for Raw Like Sushi.

Cherry caused a press furore when she performed "Buffalo Stance" on Top of the Pops while pregnant (with her second child, Tyson).

==== Homebrew ====
Cherry's second album was 1992's Homebrew. Homebrew was not as commercially successful as its predecessor. The album had some success on various Billboard charts with the songs "Buddy X" and "Trout".

"Buddy X" reached number 4 on the Billboard Dance Club chart where it spent a total of 11 weeks. The track also spent some time on Billboard's Pop Songs chart as well as the Hot 100 chart, where it peaked at number 22 during its 8-week run and peaked at number 43 in its 12-week run, respectively.

The music video for "Buddy X" earned Cherry an MTV VMA nomination at the ceremony in 1993 for the Best Female Video category, alongside Janet Jackson, Annie Lennox, and k.d. lang, with lang winning the moonman.

"Trout" features additional vocals by R.E.M. singer Michael Stipe who helped to co-write the track along with Cherry, McVey, and Jonathan Sharp and contains samples of a guitar riff from Steppenwolf as well as drums by John Bonham. With airplay on college radio and increased popularity, "Trout" spent a total of 14 weeks on Billboard's Alternative chart where it reached number 2.

Homebrew also included the work of Geoff Barrow (on "Somedays"), who later became part of Portishead.

Additional recognition was attributed to remixes of "Buddy X". First was the 1993 remix by The Notorious BIG, which is considered by Complex as "one of the great Biggie rarities in the world." Cherry stated that she and McVey picked up Biggie for the studio where they remained for the session. The song was completed in one take. "Buddy X" found success yet again in the 1999 UK garage remix by Dreem Teem.

"Move with Me" was co-written by Cherry, McVey and Lenny Kravitz.

==== Man ====
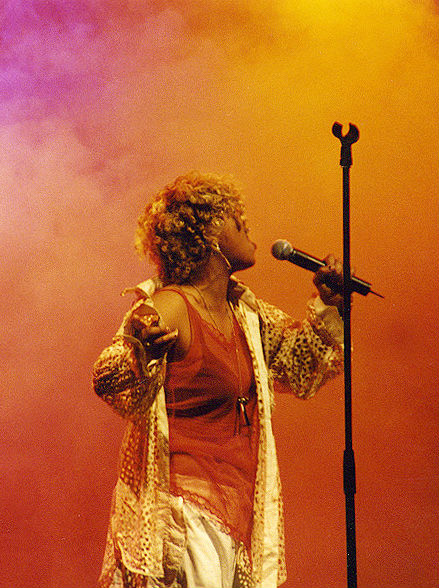
Cherry performing in Vienna in 1996

1996's Man is a solo record produced by McVey, Jonny Dollar and Christian Falk. The lead track is "Woman", her take on James Brown's 1966 track "It's a Man's Man's Man's World." It featured the worldwide hit single, "7 Seconds", featuring Youssou N'Dour; and "Trouble Man" a cover of a Marvin Gaye track. Another track, "Together Now", featured Tricky.

In France, "7 Seconds" made number one for a record 16 weeks in 1994. The song earned Cherry her second Grammy nomination and an MTV Europe Music Award for Best Song. Remixes, a French remix album of Man songs, was released in 1997.

==== Blank Project ====
Blank Project was written by Cherry and her husband McVey. Paul Simm co-wrote six tracks on the record. The record was deeply influenced by the death of her mother.

To promote the album, she toured Europe in February and March 2014. In January 2015, Cherry performed as a solo artist in New York City. Cherry is very connected to New York, as she has visited or lived there off and on since 1966.

==== Broken Politics ====
Broken Politics, her second album to be produced by Four Tet, was released on 19 October 2018, and has been called "quieter and more reflective" than Blank Project by Cherry. The lead single, "Kong", was released earlier in August. Writing in The Guardian, Laura Snapes labeled the album "revelatory" and gave it a 5-star review.

To support the album, Cherry toured across North America, Australia and Europe in late 2018 and early 2019.

==== The Versions ====
On June 10, 2022, Cherry released her next studio album, The Versions. The album features reworked and reimagined versions of her previous singles. It features vocals from Robyn and Sia.

=== Bands/collaborations ===
The Cherry Bear Collective, Cherry's former company with McVey, is now called Nomad Productions and is based in west London.

==== CirKus ====
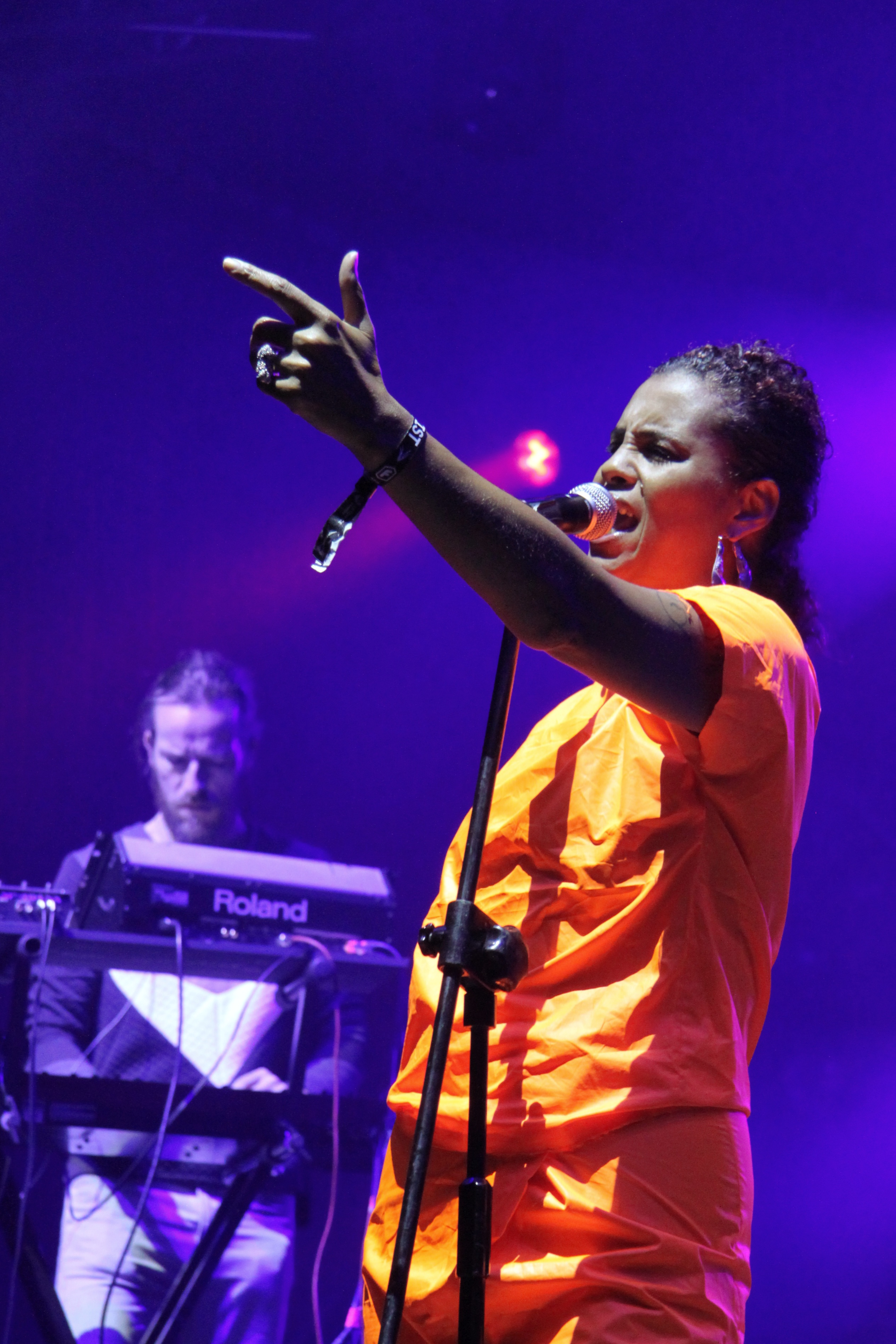
Neneh Cherry at Tauron Nowa Muzyka 2014 in Katowice, Poland

In 2006, Cherry formed a new band, cirKus, with Cameron McVey, Lolita Moon (Neneh and Cameron's daughter) and Karmil. CirKus toured Europe, with a single North American performance at the Montreal Jazz Festival in July 2006 plus a few dates in Brazil in 2008. The band's first album, Laylow, was released in France in 2006. A remixed/recorded version was released in 2007. A second CirKus album, Medicine, was released in France in March 2009.

==== The Cherry Thing ====
In March 2011, Cherry collaborated with the experimental jazz group The Thing, to release the record The Cherry Thing. The Thing is a Norwegian/Swedish jazz trio, consisting of Mats Gustafsson (saxophones), Ingebrigt Håker Flaten (double bass), and Paal Nilssen-Love (drums). The Thing took their name from the third track on stepfather Don Cherry's album Where Is Brooklyn?. The album The Cherry Thing was released in June 2012 and was recorded at Harder Sound Studios in London, England and Atlantis Studios in Stockholm, Sweden.

During a 1 June 2012 interview with Kirsty Lang, broadcast as part of the BBC Radio 4's Front Row daily podcast, Cherry discussed the jazz-inspired album, saying that The Thing were inspired by Cherry's stepfather's work, but that the band makes this inspiration their own. "I think that we're taking it on, to another place. I think that's really important," Cherry said. One of the songs from the album, "Golden Heart", was written by Don Cherry; Christer Bothén, a musician who played with Don Cherry, was invited to play on the album, and brought the song to their attention.

The album includes tracks originally performed by an eclectic mix of artists, including hip-hop artist MF Doom, Martina Topley-Bird Suicide, and The Stooges. Most of the tracks were recorded together live.

=== Other music projects ===
Although Cherry has released only a handful of albums, she has frequently collaborated with other artists.

In 1987, she was featured on the song "Slow Train to Dawn" by The The, in a duet with Matt Johnson. She also appeared in the music video.

In 2005, she collaborated with Gorillaz on the track "Kids with Guns" from the album Demon Days.

==== RocketNumberNine ====
In 2013, Cherry collaborated with London duo RocketNumberNine (named after a Sun Ra track), aka the Page Brothers – Ben and Tom Page – to record an album called MeYouWeYou. She also joined them to perform the entire album live at the Manchester International Festival in July 2013. The record is an album of 10 tracks that Cherry wrote with McVey, which they took with only vocals to RocketNumberNine, who then did their musical interpretation to all the tracks. They recorded the album live in Woodstock, New York, with Vortex. The 10 tracks were recorded in five days. Cherry calls it fearless and hardcore.

== Musical style ==
Cherry's work has covered a number of genres, including dub, electronica, free jazz, hip-hop, pop, punk, R&B, and trip-hop. She has also collaborated with a broad range of artists.

Kate Mossman of The Guardian said Cherry was "a major part of British pop history, at the centre of the 90s trip-hop underground, virtually inventing the weed-infused west London sound that eventually produced Lily Allen." Women in Pop said Cherry was responsible for "some of the greatest, most cutting-edge pop of the late 1980s and 1990s".

Cherry has said she does not really think of herself as a rapper, but as a "singer that does a bit of rapping". Breaking into the U.S. music industry was not a positive experience for Cherry. She said that while "Buffalo Stance" gave her a mainstream crossover moment in the U.S., she found the American music industry stiflingly attached to labels and genre identities.

== Other work ==
In the early 1980s, Cherry was a DJ for the Dread Broadcasting Corporation, a pirate radio station. Cherry also appeared in a non-singing capacity in Big Audio Dynamite's videos for "Medicine Show" (1985), and "C'mon Every Beatbox" (1986), dancing onstage with others during the band's performance. In the late 1980s, she helped fund the band Massive Attack

In early 2004, Cherry presented Neneh Cherry's World of Music, a six-part series broadcast on BBC Radio 2. In April 2007, she presented a six-part cookery show Neneh and Andi – Dish It Up with her friend Andi Oliver for BBC Two. Neneh and Andi appeared on Gordon Ramsay's television series The F-Word as part of the amateur brigade.

In November 2013, Cherry contributed to the art project/audio book Ällp written by Lars Yngve. Singer Peps Persson contributed music, while Cherry, Björn Ranelid and a few other celebrities, all with their roots in Sweden's most southern county Scania, recorded the book in Skånska/Scanian dialect (not "standard Swedish", aka Rikssvenska)

In 2016 she starred in Stockholm, My Love, a drama film and musical film. Set in Stockholm, it features music by the likes of Benny Andersson from ABBA.

Cherry, a short documentary about Neneh Cherry, was released by The Face magazine on YouTube on 23 March 2022.

In 2024 Cherry published an autobiography, A Thousand Threads. The book was shortlisted for the 2025 Women's Prize for Non-Fiction.

== Personal life ==
In 1983, Cherry married drummer Bruce Smith and had a daughter. They divorced in 1984.

In 1986, Cherry met producer and Morgan-McVey member Cameron "Booga Bear" McVey at London's Heathrow Airport. Cherry and McVey were en route to Japan as fashion models as part of designer Ray Petri's Buffalo Posse. Cherry proposed, and the couple married in 1990. Cherry and McVey have two daughters: singers Tyson, born in 1989 (also known as Lolita Moon), and Mabel, born in 1996. The former (who releases singles with her name stylised as TYSON) was the daughter whom Cherry was pregnant with on Top of the Pops in 1988 and is featured in the "Manchild" video, while the latter is the singer who has collaborated on singles with Clean Bandit, Tiësto and Joel Corry.

Cherry and Cameron McVey have a collaborative work relationship: McVey produced and co-wrote Raw Like Sushi. Together they have supported a variety of British acts and they were in the group cirKus together, with Cameron McVey known as Burt Ford and Tyson as Lolita Moon during this time. Cherry has a stepson, Marlon Roudette (former frontman of Mattafix), via McVey's prior relationship with Vonnie Roudette.

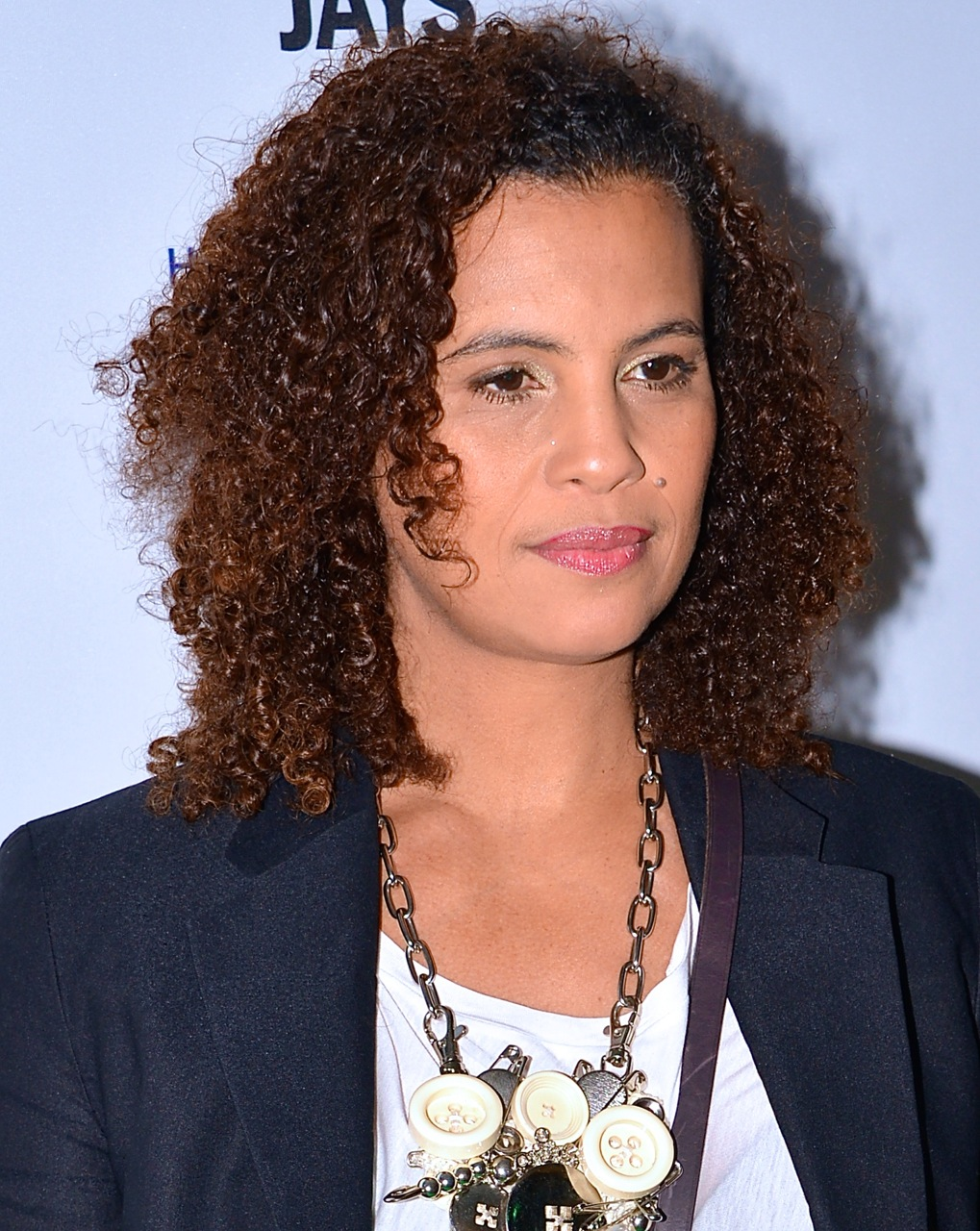
Cherry in Stockholm, February 2013

The family has a country house near Birmingham and Wolverhampton, apartments in London and Stockholm, plus the family home in the old schoolhouse in Skåne County that she and her half-brother inherited when their mother died in 2009. In 2014, Cherry said she was commuting between London and Stockholm.

=== Style ===
Since the late 1980s, Cherry had frequently worked with the stylist and jewelry designer Judy Blame.

On her street style, Cherry cites LL Cool J as an influence, as well as the photographer Jean-Baptiste Mondino, Judy Blame, and designer Ray Petri. Neneh Cherry speaks English and Swedish fluently.

== Discography ==
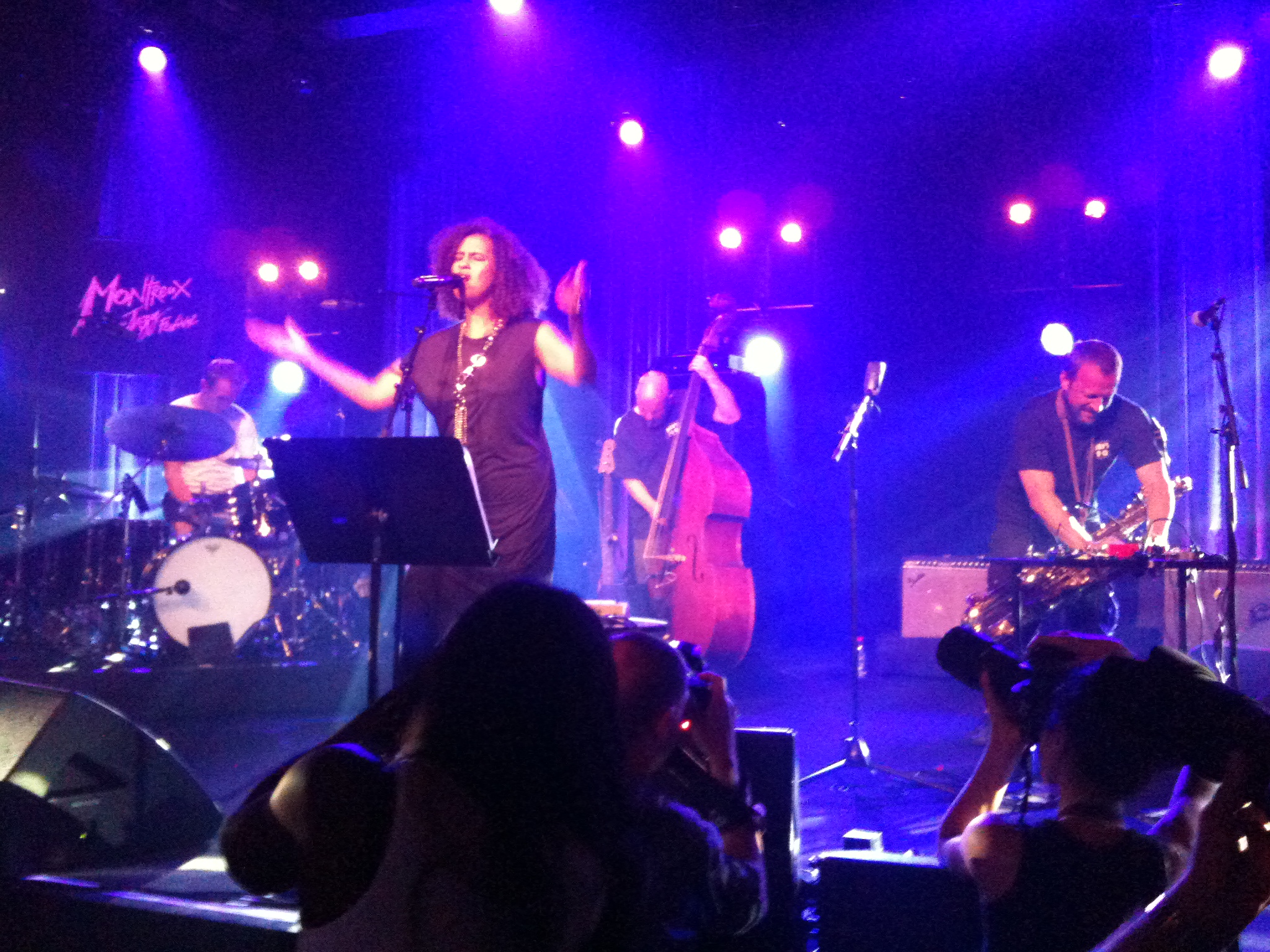
Cherry performing in 2012

- Raw Like Sushi (1989)
- Homebrew (1992)
- Man (1996)
- Blank Project (2014)
- Broken Politics (2018)
- The Versions (2022)

== Awards ==
=== AIM Independent Music Awards ===
Year	Nominee / work	Award	Result	Ref.
2024	Herself	Innovator Award	Won	

=== Brit Awards ===
Year	Nominee / work	Award	Result
1990	Herself	Best International Breakthrough	Won
1990	Herself	Best International Solo Artist	Won
1990	"Manchild"	Best Video	Nominated
1991	Herself	Best International Female	Nominated
1997	Herself	Best International Female	Nominated

=== D&AD Awards ===
Year	Nominee / work	Award	Result	Ref.
1991	"I've Got You Under My Skin"	Direction	Wood Pencil	
1991	"I've Got You Under My Skin"	Photography	Wood Pencil	

=== Danish Music Awards ===
Year	Nominee / work	Award	Result
1995	"7 Seconds"	Best International Single	Won

=== Grammy Awards ===
Year	Nominee / work	Award	Result
1990	Herself	Best New Artist	Nominated

=== Grammis ===
Year	Nominee / work	Award	Result
1990	Herself	Best Female Pop/Rock Artist	Nominated
1993	Herself	Best Modern Dance	Nominated
2013	The Cherry Thing	Jazz Recording of the Year	Won
2019	Broken Politics	Best Electronic/Dance	Won

=== Ivor Novello Awards ===
Year	Nominee / work	Award	Result
1990	"Buffalo Stance"	International Hit of the Year	Nominated
1995	"7 Seconds"	International Hit of the Year	Nominated

=== MTV Europe Music Awards ===
Year	Nominee / work	Award	Result
1994	"7 Seconds"	Best Song	Won
1994	Herself	Best Female	Nominated
1996	Herself	Best Female	Nominated

=== MTV Video Music Awards ===
Year	Nominee / work	Award	Result
1989	"Buffalo Stance"	Best New Artist	Nominated
1991	"I've Got You Under My Skin"	Best Special Effects	Nominated
1991	"I've Got You Under My Skin"	Best Female Video	Nominated
1993	"Buddy X"	Best Female Video	Nominated

=== Music & Media Year-End Awards ===
Year	Nominee / work	Award	Result	Ref.
1989	Raw Like Sushi	Debut Album of the Year	3rd place	

=== NME Awards ===
Year	Nominee / work	Award	Result	Ref.
2022	Herself	Icon Award	Won	

=== Nordic Music Prize ===
Year	Nominee / work	Award	Result
2014	Blank Project	Album of the Year	Nominated

=== Rober Awards Music poll ===
Year	Nominee / work	Award	Result
2012	"Dream Baby Dream" (with The Thing)	Best Cover Version	Nominated
2014	Herself	Best R&B	Nominated

=== Silver Clef Awards ===
Year	Nominee / work	Award	Result	Ref.
2023	Herself	Outstanding Achievement Award	Won	

=== Smash Hits Poll Winners Party ===
Year	Nominee / work	Award	Result
1989	Herself	Most Promising New Solo Artist	Nominated

=== UK Video Music Awards ===
Year	Nominee / work	Award	Result
2018	"Kong"	Best Styling in a Video	Nominated
2018	"Kong"	Best Color Grading in a Video	Nominated

== See also ==
- Swedish hip hop
- List of artists who reached number one on the U.S. dance chart
