= Buffalo Stance =

1988 single by Neneh Cherry

Single by Neneh Cherry

from the album Raw Like Sushi
- B-side: "Give Me a Muthuf***ing Breakbeat" (Sukka mix)
- Released: 28 November 1988
- Studio: Hot Nights (London, England)
- Genre: Hip hop; dance-pop; freestyle
- Length: 5:42 (album version); 4:07 (7-inch edit); 3:38 (radio edit)
- Label: Circa; Virgin
- Songwriters: Neneh Cherry; Cameron McVey; Jamie Morgan; Phillip Ramacon
- Producers: Tim Simenon ("Bomb the Bass"); Mark Saunders

Neneh Cherry singles chronology
| "Buffalo Stance" (1988) | "Manchild" (1989) |

Music video
- "Buffalo Stance" on YouTube

"Buffalo Stance" is a song by Swedish singer-songwriter Neneh Cherry, released in November 1988 by Circa and Virgin Records as the first single from the singer's debut album, Raw Like Sushi (1989). The song was co-written by Cherry and produced by Tim Simenon and Mark Saunders. It peaked at No. 3 on both the UK Singles Chart and the US Billboard Hot 100, and it reached No. 1 in the Netherlands and in Cherry's native Sweden.

The single's accompanying music video was directed by John Maybury and received a nomination at the 1989 MTV Video Music Awards. Cherry performed the song live on Top of the Pops whilst seven months pregnant. When asked by a reporter if it was safe for her to go on stage and perform, Cherry answered: "Yes, of course! It's not an illness." In 2023, Billboard magazine ranked "Buffalo Stance" among the 500 best pop songs of all time.

== Background ==
An early version of "Buffalo Stance" appeared as the B-side on the 1986 Stock, Aitken, and Waterman-produced single "Looking Good Diving" by duo Morgan-McVey, which was made up of Jamie Morgan and Cherry's future husband Cameron McVey. The song, titled "Looking Good Diving with the Wild Bunch", was sung by Cherry. Morgan says the B-side was written using elements from the single's A-side, most notably Phil Ramacon's distinctive ascending keyboard hook, with Cherry writing the rap, while he supplied lyrics for the sung chorus. He says that no one working on the track recognised its hit potential, which was only reconsidered after his chance encounter at The Wag nightclub with DJ Tim Simenon, who expressed interest in reworking the song.

The song title refers to "Buffalo", a group of photographers, models, musicians, hair and makeup artists, etc. formed by fashion stylist Ray Petri, of which group Cherry, Morgan, and McVey were all members. A buffalo stance is, Cherry told The New York Times, "an attitude you have to have in order to get by. It's not about fashion but about survival in inner cities and elsewhere." The song's title is also a reference to the Malcolm McLaren song "Buffalo Gals" (1982), which "Buffalo Stance" samples. Other samples came from Rock Steady Crew's "Hey You", and the saxophone break is from the band Miami's song "Chicken Yellow" (1974).

== Critical reception ==
Robert Hilburn from Los Angeles Times complimented "Buffalo Stance" as "a sly and sassy, yet also disarmingly tender slice of street-wise admonition to stand up for your rights rather than let insecurities or peer pressure lead you to mistakes in judgment." Another Los Angeles Times editor, Chris Willman, commented, "No money-man can win my love / It's sweetness that I'm dreaming of, sings Cherry, turning down a "gigolo" who may or may not be a garden-variety pimp. Nothing new there, but the pleasure of this tale is in the telling, and Britain's ripe-and-ready Cherry is an irresistible storyteller, rapping the verses with cocky defiance and singing the choruses with equally unruly loveliness."

Mark Lepage from Montreal Gazette stated, "The lovely Neneh has the best song on radio now, with the possible exception of Womack and Womack's 'Teardrops'. 'Buffalo Stance' is a sexy, saucy and feisty rap/dance summer hit, the kind of thing for which car radios were created." People Magazine remarked that the singer half-sings, half-raps, "mock-tough lyrics" over a prominent drum-machine beat and minimal synthesized accompaniment. The reviewer added that "when she sticks to that formula, singing about infatuation and seduction on the city's mean sidewalks" as on "Buffalo Stance", "she's fresh and inviting." Miranda Sawyer from Smash Hits felt it's "the best dance record in yonks. A brilliant melody plus a rap which knocks the 'spots' off Salt 'n' Pepa makes this utterly ace and runner-up Single of the Fortnight."

== Retrospective response ==
Andy Kellman from AllMusic described the song as "at once a personal manifesto and celebration and critique of city-street peacocking". Annie Zaleski from The A.V. Club called it an "unstoppable, electro-hip-hop hybrid". She stated, "With smart samples and swaggering production from Bomb the Bass—not to mention fiercely feminist lyrics that demand respect and assert independence—'Buffalo Stance' remains one of the best singles of the '80s." Angus Taylor, for the BBC, noted "its undulating synths, You go girl! sentiments and killer hooks is every bit the floor-filler it was ten years ago." Kieran Yates from The Guardian named it a "punchy manifesto". Stephen Holden from The New York Times felt "the musically multilayered dance hit 'Buffalo Stance' defines a late-80's street attitude." In a 2014 retrospective review, Pop Rescue commented that "it’s (OMG!) got a female rapper, record scratching, and a fast beat, and this was a fresh sound. Only Salt-N-Pepa could have got close."

Lesley Chow from The Quietus said that on the song, "Cherry already comes across as a fully formed artist: powerful and casually multicultural, as we might expect from an African-Swedish singer raised in Yorkshire and Long Island." She added that it is "a song of many moods, as Cherry goes on to alternate between anger and softness, anti-materialism and a high fashion attitude. A rising synth figure bubbles us up to a heavenly chorus ("No money man can win my love/ It's sweetness that I'm thinking of") which shows a rare tenderness in the narrator. Even though the track has been unrelenting up to that point, the bubbling finale and the melody expose an underlying effervescence."

== Chart performance ==
In Europe, "Buffalo Stance" peaked at No. 1 in the singer's native Sweden as well as in the Netherlands. It entered the top 10 also in Austria, Belgium, Denmark, Finland, Greece, Ireland, Luxembourg, Norway, Switzerland, the United Kingdom, and West Germany. In the UK, "Buffalo Stance" peaked at No. 3 during its sixth week on the UK Singles Chart on 8 January 1989. It spent two weeks at that position before dropping to No. 8 and then leaving the top 10 the following week. On the Eurochart Hot 100, the single reached No. 3 in February 1989. Outside Europe, "Buffalo Stance" charted on five different Billboard charts in the US: No. 3 on the Hot 100, No. 1 on both the Hot Dance Club Play chart and the 12-inch Singles Sales chart, No. 16 on the Hot Rap Tracks chart and No. 30 on the Hot Black Singles chart. In Canada, the single reached No. 1 on the RPM Dance Singles chart while reaching No. 3 on the RPM 100 Singles chart. It also spent five weeks atop The Record's singles chart. In Australia and New Zealand, "Buffalo Stance" charted at No. 21 and No. 14, respectively. The single earned Cherry a gold record in Canada, Sweden and the United States and a silver record in the UK.

== Impact and legacy ==
In 1991, "Buffalo Stance" was awarded one of BMI's Pop Awards, honoring the songwriters, composers and music publishers of the song. German rock and pop culture magazine Spex included it in their "The Best Singles of the Century" list in 1999. Q Magazine ranked it No. 606 in their list of the "1001 Best Songs Ever" in 2003. The Daily Telegraph ranked it No. 37 in their "Top 50 Dance Songs" list in 2015. The Guardian ranked it No. 8 in their list of "The greatest ever female rap tracks – ranked!" in 2018, while Time Out ranked the song No. 13 in their "The 50 best '80s songs" list same year. Rolling Stone ranked "Buffalo Stance" No. 412 in their list of "500 Best Songs of All Time" in 2021 and No. 71 in their "200 Greatest Dance Songs of All Time" in 2022. In October 2023, Billboard magazine ranked it number 238 in their "500 Best Pop Songs of All Time". In September 2024, Swedish national radio Sveriges Radio P3 ranked "Buffalo Stance" among the world's 300 best songs.

== Music video ==
The music video for "Buffalo Stance" was directed by English filmmaker and artist John Maybury. In the video, a pregnant Cherry performs the song in front of a backdrop filled with colorful computer generated visuals. She is joined by a DJ and two backup singers. In 2024, co-producer of the song Mark Saunders recalled, "The video was pretty low budget but a heavily pregnant Neneh pulled it off in an amazing way - and caused quite a stir - pregnant woman dancing around in a music video - how shocking!?" "Buffalo Stance" was nominated in the category for Best New Artist in a Video at the 1989 MTV Video Music Awards. In January 2020, to celebrate the 30th anniversary of Cherry's debut album Raw Like Sushi, director Stephen Isaac-Wilson made a re-imagined video version of the song.

== Track listings ==
- 7-inch and US cassette single

A. "Buffalo Stance"
B. "Buffalo Stance" (Electro Ski mix)

- Non-US 12-inch single

A1. "Buffalo Stance"
A2. "Buffalo Stance" (Scratchapella)
B1. "Buffalo Stance" (instrumental)
B2. "Buffalo Stance" (Electro Ski mix)

- European CD single and UK mini-CD single
1. "Buffalo Stance" (extended/12-inch mix) – 5:43
2. "Buffalo Stance" (Scratchapella) – 1:38
3. "Buffalo Stance" (Electro Ski) – 3:38
4. "Give Me a Muthuf***ing Breakbeat" (Sukka mix)
- US and Canadian 12-inch single

A1. "Buffalo Stance" (12-inch A mix) – 5:47
A2. "Buffalo Stance" (Sukka mix) – 5:20
B1. "Buffalo Stance" (1/2 Way 2 House mix) – 7:40
B2. "Buffalo Stance" (Techno Stance remix I) – 6:40
B3. "Buffalo Stance" (Scratchapella) – 1:39

- Australian cassette single
1. "Buffalo Stance"
2. "Buffalo Stance" (instrumental)
3. "Buffalo Stance" (Electro Ski mix)
- Japanese mini-CD single
1. "Buffalo Stance"
2. "Manchild"

== Personnel ==
Personnel are sourced from Sound on Sound.

- Neneh Cherry – lead and backing vocals
- Mark Saunders – E-mu Emulator II, Roland JX-10, Yamaha DX7, Casio CZ-101, Atari 1040ST programming, Akai S900 sampler
- Tim Simenon – Atari 1040ST programming, Akai S900 sampler, turn-tables

== Charts ==
=== Weekly charts ===
| Chart (1988–1990) | Peak position |
|---|---|
| Australia (ARIA) | 21 |
| Austria (Ö3 Austria Top 40) | 7 |
| Belgium (Ultratop 50 Flanders) | 4 |
| Canada Retail Singles (The Record) | 1 |
| Canada Top Singles (RPM) | 3 |
| Canada Dance/Urban (RPM) | 1 |
| Denmark (IFPI) | 9 |
| Europe (Eurochart Hot 100) | 3 |
| Finland (Suomen virallinen lista) | 5 |
| Greece (IFPI) | 2 |
| Ireland (IRMA) | 7 |
| Italy (Musica e dischi) | 23 |
| Italy Airplay (Music & Media) | 12 |
| Luxembourg (Radio Luxembourg) | 2 |
| Netherlands (Dutch Top 40) | 1 |
| Netherlands (Single Top 100) | 1 |
| New Zealand (Recorded Music NZ) | 14 |
| Norway (VG-lista) | 3 |
| Sweden (Sverigetopplistan) | 1 |
| Switzerland (Schweizer Hitparade) | 2 |
| UK Singles (Official Charts) | 3 |
| US Billboard Hot 100 | 3 |
| US Dance Club Songs (Billboard) | 1 |
| US Dance Singles Sales (Billboard) | 1 |
| US Hot R&B/Hip-Hop Songs (Billboard) | 30 |
| US Hot Rap Songs (Billboard) | 16 |
| US Dance Tracks (Dance Music Report) | 1 |
| West Germany (GfK) | 2 |

=== Year-end charts ===
| Chart (1989) | Position |
|---|---|
| Australia (ARIA) | 92 |
| Belgium (Ultratop) | 41 |
| Canada Top Singles (RPM) | 41 |
| Canada Dance/Urban (RPM) | 12 |
| Europe (Eurochart Hot 100) | 35 |
| Netherlands (Dutch Top 40) | 6 |
| Netherlands (Single Top 100) | 10 |
| New Zealand (RIANZ) | 10 |
| UK Singles (OCC) | 86 |
| US Billboard Hot 100 | 36 |
| US 12-inch Singles Sales (Billboard) | 15 |
| US Dance Club Play (Billboard) | 28 |
| West Germany (GfK) | 21 |

== Certifications ==
| Region | Certification | Certified units/sales |
|---|---|---|
| Canada (Music Canada) | Gold | 50,000^{^} |
| Sweden (GLF) | Gold | 25,000^{^} |
| United Kingdom (BPI) | Silver | 250,000^{^} |
| United States (RIAA) | Gold | 500,000^{^} |
^{^} Shipments figures based on certification alone.

== Release history ==
| Region | Date | Format(s) | Label(s) | Ref. |
|---|---|---|---|---|
| Europe | 28 November 1988 | 7-inch vinyl; 12-inch vinyl; mini-CD | Circa; Virgin | |
| Japan | 21 August 1989 | Mini-CD | Circa; Virgin Japan | |
