= Cameron McVey =

British musician and record producer (born 1957)

- Also known as: Booga Bear, Burt Ford
- Born: Cameron Andrew McVey; 11 August 1957 (age 69); Wood Green, London Borough of Haringey, England
- Occupations: Singer, songwriter, record producer
- Spouse: Neneh Cherry (m. 1990)

Cameron Andrew McVey (born 11 August 1957) is an English singer, songwriter and record producer. He has worked with the acts Massive Attack, Portishead, All Saints, Sugababes, and his wife Neneh Cherry. He is the father of Marlon Roudette, Tyson, and Mabel.

== Early life ==
McVey grew up in Cockfosters, North London. He was educated at Queen Elizabeth's Boys' School, Barnet.

== Career ==
By 1979, McVey had been working as a photographer. He took the photograph featured on Madness' 1979 album One Step Beyond....

McVey started creating music as a member of the new wave band Bim in the early 1980s, in which he was the lead singer. The band released one album in 1982, Boobams Out! and seven singles from 1980 to 1982.

In 1987, as one half of duo Morgan-McVey, he released the single "Looking Good Diving". Originally conceived as a Simon & Garfunkel-style male vocal duo who would harmonise over reggae beats, early demos failed to deliver on the concept. Facing creative inertia, the act's record company convinced them to work with rising pop producers Stock Aitken Waterman (SAW), a proposition that left them with mixed feelings. Band member Jamie Morgan says McVey was so "embarrassed" by the resulting record and video, the band quickly disintegrated. However, McVey has since been complimentary of SAW's studio skills, calling the trio "more punk than the punks".

McVey met Neneh Cherry in 1987 and became a producer and her manager. The B-side of "Looking Good Diving", "Looking Good Diving with the Wild Bunch", was reworked into Cherry's 1988 single "Buffalo Stance".

Cherry and McVey provided financial support, via the Cherry Bear organisation, in the early stages of Massive Attack and Portishead's careers. Around 1990, McVey became Massive Attack's manager and he co-produced their first album Blue Lines. The album was partly recorded at his house.

=== CirKus ===
In 2006, McVey (under the name Burt Ford) along with Neneh Cherry, Matt Kent (a.k.a. Karmil) and Lolita Moon released the album Laylow, as a band called CirKus. In 2008, CirKus (with the same line-up) released their second album Medicine.

== Personal life ==
In 1983, McVey fathered a son, Marlon Roudette, with Vincentian artist and designer Vonnie Roudette.

McVey met Neneh Cherry in 1987 at Heathrow Airport while they were en route to Japan as fashion models as part of London Designer Ray Petri's Buffalo Posse. The couple married in 1990; they have two daughters, singers Tyson, born in 1989 (also known as Lolita Moon), and Mabel. The family lived throughout Europe. In 1993, they moved to near Málaga, Spain, and lived there until 1999. Briefly in 1995, they lived in Brooklyn, New York, where they had purchased a home in the Park Slope neighbourhood. Soon after moving in, the couple were held up at gunpoint and robbed by a teenage bandit. They headed back to London's Primrose Hill. Eventually they migrated to Cherry's native Hässleholm, Sweden, living in the same schoolhouse-turned-home where Cherry was raised (featured in the Homebrew album's artwork).

== Albums produced ==
=== Neneh Cherry albums ===
- Raw Like Sushi (1989)
- Homebrew (1992)
- Man (1996)
- The Cherry Thing (2012)

=== Other works ===
- Shotgun by Jamie J. Morgan (1990)
- Blue Lines by Massive Attack (1991)
- Shape, by Frente (1996)
- All Saints by All Saints (1997)
- One Touch, by the Sugababes (2000)
- How Do You Call It, by Patrice Bart-Williams (2002)
- Revolution in Me, by Siobhán Donaghy (2003)
- Taller in More Ways, by the Sugababes (2005)
- 11th Floor and Lights, by Kitchen Party (2013)
- Spirit Of Minnie by Will Varley (2018)
