= List of UK garage songs =

The following is a list of notable UK garage songs which charted on any record chart, particularly the UK Singles Chart and UK Dance Singles Chart. The list also includes songs which fall under the subgenres of 2-step garage, speed garage, bassline, breakstep and future garage.

== 0–9 ==
Song	Artist	Year	UK chart position	UK Dance Singles
"The 10th Night"	Y-Tribe	1999	—	20
"138 Trek"	DJ Zinc	2000	27	1
"21 Seconds"	So Solid Crew	2001	1	1
"450"	Bad Boy Chiller Crew featuring S Dog	2020	84	25
"8 Days a Week"	Sweet Female Attitude	2000	43	9

== A ==
Song	Artist	Year	UK chart position	UK Dance Singles
"Ain't No Stoppin' Us"	DJ Luck & MC Neat featuring JJ	2000	8	3
"All I Want"	Mis-Teeq	2001	2	2
"All 'n' All"	187 Lockdown featuring D'Empress	1999	43	8
"Anytime"	Nu-Birth	1997	41	1

== B ==
Song	Artist	Year	UK chart position	UK Dance Singles
"B-Bop"	Jeremy Sylvester	2001	189	
"B with Me"	Mis-Teeq	2002	5	
"Baby Cakes"	3 of a Kind	2004	1	3
"Baby, Can I Get Your Number"	OBI Project featuring Harry, Asher D and DJ What?	2001	75	13
"Back in the Day"/"Why Me?"	Asher D	2002	43	8
"Back Up (To Me)"	Wookie featuring Lain	2001	38	1
"Bad Boys Holler Boo!"	5050	2002	73	
"Basslick"	Second Protocol	2000	58	3
"Bassline Junkie"	Dizzee Rascal	2013	10	4
"Battle"	Wookie	2000	10	2
"Beeper"	The Count & Sinden	2008	69	1
"Beg for You"	Charli XCX featuring Rina Sawayama	2022	24	
"Blk & Blu"	Chase & Status featuring Ed Thomas	2014	48	14
"BMW"	Bad Boy Chiller Crew	2022	7	1
"Body Groove"	Architechs featuring Nana	2000	3	2
"Boom Selection"	Genius Cru	2001	12	1
"Booo!"	Sticky featuring Ms. Dynamite	2001	12	1
"Bouncing Flow"	K2 Family	2001	27	3
"Bound 4 Da Reload (Casualty)"	Oxide & Neutrino	2000	1	
"Bring It on to My Love"	De Nada	2002	24	
"Bruce Wayne"	Bugzy Malone	2017	99	
"Buddy X 99"	Dreem Teem vs. Neneh Cherry	1999	15	1
"Buggin"	True Steppers featuring Dane Bowers	2000	6	2
"Bump 'n' Grind (I Am Feeling Hot Tonight)"	M-Dubs featuring Lady Saw	2000	59	8

== C ==
Song	Artist	Year	UK chart position	UK Dance Singles	UK Independent Singles	Billboard World Digital Song Sales	NZ Hot Singles
"Call It Fate"	Richie Dan	2000	34	5			
"Can't Get Used to Losing You"	Colour Girl	2000	31	13			
"Capable of Love"	PinkPantheress	2023					36
"Champagne Dance"	Pay As U Go	2002	13	5			
"Cheque One Two"	Sunship	2000	75	3			
"Come Over"	Rudimental featuring Anne-Marie and Tion Wayne	2020	26				
"Coming Home"	K-Warren featuring Lee-O	2001	32	1			
"Cool with You"	NewJeans	2023			48	7	
"Cops & Robbers"	Sammy Virji and Skepta	2025	36	9			7
"Course Bruv"	Genius Cru	2001	39	4			
"Crazy Love"	MJ Cole	2000	10	1			

== D ==
Song	Artist	Year	UK chart position	UK Dance Singles	UK Singles Downloads	NZ Hot Singles
"Da Antidote"	Stanton Warriors	2001	69	10		
"Daddy-O"	Wideboys featuring Shaznay Lewis	2008	32			
"Dance On My Own"	M.O	2014	49			
"Dangerous"	Same People	2000	163			
"Dedicated to Love"	TJ Cases and Marissa	2000	85	1		
"Deeper"	Disclosure and Leon Thomas	2025				14
"Deeper"	Serious Danger	1997	40	1		
"Destiny"	Dem 2	1998	58	1		
"Devil's Nightmare"	Oxide & Neutrino	2001	16			
"The Don"	187 Lockdown	1998	29	10		
"Don't Play"	Anne-Marie, KSI and Digital Farm Animals	2021	2			
"Don't Say Love"	Leigh-Anne	2023	11			
"Don't Think Twice"	Rita Ora	2023			27	
"Don't You Worry About Me"	Bad Boy Chiller Crew	2021	31	11		
"Dooms Night (Revisited)"	Azzido Da Bass	2000	8	1		
"Do U Dream"	Serious Danger featuring Carlton	1999	132			
"Down"	Ruff Cut Bias featuring Nicky Prince	2000	161	15		
"Do You Really Like It?"	DJ Pied Piper and the Masters of Ceremonies	2001	1	1		
"Dreams"	Smokin Beats featuring Lyn Eden	1998	23	1		

== E ==
Song	Artist	Year	UK chart position	UK Dance Singles
"The Energy (Feel the Vibe)"	Astro Trax	1998	74	7
"Enough Is Enough"	Y-Tribe featuring Elisabeth Troy	1999	49	4
"Everybody Come On (Can U Feel It)"	Stanton Warriors / Mr Reds vs. DJ Skribble	1999 / 2003	13	

== F ==
Song	Artist	Year	UK chart position	UK Dance Singles
"Falling"	Boom!	2000	11	
"Feel It"	G:UK	2001	85	
"Feels So Good"	B-15 Project featuring Shola Ama and Ms. Dynamite	2001	82	19
"Fill Me In"	Craig David	2000	1	
"Flim"	DJ Zinc featuring Slarta Jon	2004	80	3
"Flowers"	Sweet Female Attitude	2000	2	1
"Flowers"	DJ Spoony featuring Sugababes	2019		26
"Fly Bi"	Teebone featuring MC Kie and MC Sparks	2000	43	1
"Frail State of Mind"	The 1975	2019	54	
"Freak Like Me"	Tru Faith & Dub Conspiracy	2000	12	1
"Freek Me Up"	Jodeci vs Club Asylum	1998	92	
"Friendly Pressure"	Jhelisa	1998	75	5
"Funk on Ah Roll" (Bump & Flex Mix)	James Brown	1999	40	1

== G ==
Song	Artist	Year	UK chart position	UK Dance Singles
"Gabriel"	Roy Davis Jr. featuring Peven Everett	1997	22	5
"G.A.R.A.G.E."	Corrupted Cru featuring MC Neat	2002	59	8
"A Garage Affair"	Timeless	2000	—	19
"Garage Girls"	Lonyo	2001	39	4
"Get Enuff"	Wookie featuring Lain	2000	80	13
"Get on Down"	JKL featuring MC Neat	1999	—	18
"Girlfriend"	Caramel	1999	172	9
"Girls Like Us"	B-15 Project	2000	7	1
"Girls Play Too"	Frances James and DJ Face	2001	79	8
"Gonna Be Mine"	Addictive featuring T2	2008	47	5
"Good for the Soul"	Madonna	2026	—	—
"Good Rhymes"	Da Click	1998	14	2
"Good Times"	Ed Case featuring Skin	2002	49	15
"Got Me Started"	Troye Sivan	2023	34	
"Got Myself Together"	Bump & Flex featuring Kallaghan	1999	84	3
"Gotta Get Thru This"	Daniel Bedingfield	2001	1	1
"Grouch"	Sirus	2002	121	
"Grown Flex"	Chip featuring Bugzy Malone	2021	63	
"Gunman"	187 Lockdown	1997	16	1

== H ==
Song	Artist	Year	UK chart position	UK Dance Singles	UK R&B Singles
"Happy Day"	SJC featuring Wayne Allen	1999	—	17	—
"Has It Come to This?"	The Streets	2001	18		—
"Haters"	So Solid Crew	2001	8	13	—
"Heartbroken"	T2 featuring Jodie Aysha	2007	2	1	—
"The Heartless Theme"	Heartless Crew	2002	21	3	—
"Heavenly Love"	Timmi Magic featuring John Junior	2001	126		—
"Hello"	Jhay Palmer featuring MC Image	2002	69	11	—
"Here Come the Lick"	Suburban Lick	2000	180		—
"Higher (Free)"	All About She	2013	20	5	—
"High Noon"	Serious Danger	1998	54	12	
"Hold on to Me"	MJ Cole featuring Elisabeth Troy	2000	35	2	—
"Hooked on You"	Volatile Agents featuring Simone Benn	2001	54	23	—
"Hourglass"	Disclosure featuring Lion Babe	2015	80		—
"House & Garage"	Morrisson featuring Aitch	2021	46	—	16
"Hyper! (Hype the Funk)"	Reach & Spin	2001	79		—

== I ==
Song	Artist	Year	UK chart position	UK Dance Singles
"I Can't Wait"	Ladies First	2002	19	5
"I Don't Smoke"	DJ Dee Kline	2000	11	2
"I Need Your Love"	Dub Syndicate	1999 / 2002	88	
"If U Need It"	Sammy Virji	2024	85	27
"Illegal"	PinkPantheress	2025	36	
"Ill Street Blues"	Deekline and Wizard	2004	104	6
"Imagine (Asylum Remix)"	Shola Ama	2000	24	1
"I'm All About You"	DJ Luck & MC Neat featuring Ari Gold	2001	18	10
"In Ayia Napa"	Lonyo	2000	91	38
"In and Out"	3rd Edge	2002	15	6
"In My Life"	Ryze	2002	46	
"I Refuse (What You Want)"	Somore featuring Damon Trueitt	1997	21	4
"Irie"	DJ Luck & MC Neat	2002	31	13
"It Ain't Enough"	Dreem Teem vs. Artful Dodger	2001	20	2

== J ==
Song	Artist	Year	UK chart position	UK Dance Singles	UK Independent Singles
"Joy"	Mark Ryder	2001	34	1	
"Joyrider"	Colour Girl	1999 / 2000	51	2	
"Jump Up"	Just 4 Jokes featuring MC RB	2002	67	28	
"Just for Me"	PinkPantheress	2021	27		
"Just Gets Better"	TJR featuring Xavier	1997	28	2	
"Just Wanna Luv U"	Distant Soundz featuring Damae	2003			46

== K ==
Song	Artist	Year	UK chart position	UK Dance Singles
"Kung-Fu"	187 Lockdown	1998	9	1

== L ==
Song	Artist	Year	UK chart position	UK Dance Singles
"La La La"	Naughty Boy featuring Sam Smith	2013	1	1
"Ladbroke Grove"	AJ Tracey	2019	3	
"Let Me Be Your Fantasy" (Trick or Treat Remix featuring MC Tails)	Baby D	2000	16	3
Let Me Luv U	X-ite	2001	83	
"Let's Just Call It Love"	Lisa Stansfield	2001	48	
"A Little Bit of Luck"	DJ Luck & MC Neat	1999	9	1
"A London Thing"	Scott Garcia featuring MC Styles	1997	29	7
"Long Time Coming"	Bump & Flex	1998	73	3
"Love Bug"	Ramsey & Fen	1998 / 2000	75	10
"Love Come Down"	AC Burrell featuring Harmanii Rae	2001	178	39
"Love Like This"	Zayn	2023	36	
"Love You Anyway"	De Nada	2001	15	7
"Love Shy (Club Asylum Remix)"	Kristine Blond	2000	28	3
"Love Shy (Thinking About You)"	Platnum	2008	12	3

== M ==
Song	Artist	Year	UK chart position	UK Dance Singles
"The Magnificent"	Agent 00	1998	65	11
"Masquerade"	Gerideau	1998	63	
"Mas Que Nada"	Colour Girl featuring PSG	2001	57	10
"Masterblaster 2000"	DJ Luck & MC Neat featuring JJ	2000	5	1
"Messin"	Ladies First	2001	30	5
"More Dub Essentials"	24Hour Experience	2000		40
"Mosquito"	PinkPantheress	2023	74	
"Movin' Too Fast"	Artful Dodger featuring Romina Johnson	1999	2	1
"My Desire"	Amira	1997/2001	20	1
"My Destiny"	Delinquent featuring Kcat	2008	19	
"My Forbidden Lover"	Romina Johnson	2000	59	15
"My Love" (10º Below mixes)	Kele Le Roc	1999	8	

== N ==
Song	Artist	Year	UK chart position	UK Dance Singles
"Nasty"	AC Burrell featuring Mega and Romeo	2000	84	10
"Need Good Love"	Tuff Jam	1998	44	2
"Neighbourhood"	Zed Bias	1999/2000	25	3
"Never Be Your Woman"	Naughty Boy with Wiley featuring Emeli Sandé	2010	8	
"Never Gonna Let You Go"	Tina Moore	1997	7	1
"Nobody Better"	Tina Moore	1998	20	2
"No Good 4 Me"	Oxide & Neutrino featuring Megaman, Romeo and Lisa Maffia	2000	6	
"No Holding Back"	Hardwell featuring Craig David	2016	—	
"Nothing Like This"	Blonde and Craig David	2016	15	5

== O ==
Song	Artist	Year	UK chart position	UK Dance Singles	K-pop Hot 100 (Billboard)
"Oh Baby"	Nathan Dawe and Bru-C featuring Bshp and Issey Cross	2023	35		—
"Oh Boy"	Fabulous Baker Boys	1997	34	3	—
"Omen"	Disclosure featuring Sam Smith	2015	13	6	—
"One More Time"	Craig David	2016	30	12	—
"One Night Stand" (Sunship Mix)	Mis-Teeq	2001	5	2	—
"On My Mind"	Jorja Smith and Preditah	2017	54		—
"On the Lam"	Kele	2010	—		—
"Out of Your Mind"	True Steppers and Dane Bowers featuring Victoria Beckham	2000	2	10	—
"Over Here"	M-Dubs featuring Richie Dan	1999	84	9	—
"Oxygen"	Twice	2020	—	—	90

== P ==
Song	Artist	Year	UK chart position	UK Dance Singles	UK Independent Singles	Gaon Digital Chart (KOR)
"Pain"	PinkPantheress	2021	35			—
"Piano Loco"	DJ Luck & MC Neat	2001	12	1		—
"Please Don't Turn Me On"	Artful Dodger featuring Lifford	2000	4	8		—
"Poison"	Corrupted Cru vs DJ Luck, Shy Cookie and MC Neat	2001	146		45	—
"Prism"	Shinee	2016	—	—	—	52
"Put Your Hands Up"	Reflex featuring MC Viper	2001	72	3		—

== R ==
Song	Artist	Year	UK chart position	UK Dance Singles	K-pop Hot 100 (Billboard)
"Rainbow"	Twice	2019	—	—	94
"Rap Dis"/"Only Wanna Know U Cos Ure Famous"	Oxide & Neutrino	2001	12		—
"Really Love"	KSI featuring Craig David and Digital Farm Animals	2020	3	2	—
"Reminisce"	Corrupted Cru featuring MC Neat	1999		16	—
"Remy on da Floor"	Oxide & Neutrino	2001	96	16	—
"Re-Rewind (The Crowd Say Bo Selecta)"	Artful Dodger featuring Craig David	1999	2	1	—
"Ride wid Us"	So Solid Crew	2002	19		—
"Right Before My Eyes"	N'n'G featuring Kallaghan and MC Neat	1998 / 2000	12	1	—
"Right Now"	Mary J. Blige	2014	100		—
"Ring Ring Ring"	Aaron Soul	2001	14	15	—
"RipGroove"	Double 99	1997	14	1	—
"Ripped in 2 Minutes"	A vs B	1998	49		—
"Rockin'"	The Weeknd	2017	26		—
"Ruff Tuff'N'Ready"	JJ Louis and Jade Lion featuring MC Banton	2001		16	—
"Rumours"	Damage	2000	22		—
"R U Sleeping"	Indo	1998	31	3	—

== S ==
Song	Artist	Year	UK chart position	UK Dance Singles
"Sambuca"	Wideboys featuring Dennis G	2001	15	1
"Saved My Life"	Todd Edwards	1996	69	
"See Line Woman '99"	Songstress	1999	64	3
"Serious"	Maxwell D	2001	38	2
"Seven"	Jungkook featuring Latto	2023	3	
"Shine On"	Scott & Leon featuring Sylvia Mason-James	2001	34	8
"Show Me the Money"	Architechs	2001	20	9
"Sincere"	MJ Cole	1998/2000	38/13	1
"Sing-A-Long"	Shanks & Bigfoot	2000	12	1
"So Beautiful"	DJ Innocence featuring Alex Charles	2002	51	5
"So Freakin' Tight"	Tough Love	2015	11	1
"Something"	Artful Dodger	1999	-	24
"Something in Your Eyes"	Ed Case featuring Shelley Nelson	2000	38	2
"Sometimes It Snows in April"	Amar	2000	48	6
"Sorry (I Didn't Know)"	Monsta Boy featuring Denzie	2000	25	1
"Sorry (You Lied to Me)"	Masterstepz and Celetia	2001	91	29
"Sound Bwoy Burial/All Night Long"	Gant	1997	67	4
"Sounds of Eden (Everytime I See the Girl)"	Deep Cover	2002	63	
"Spend the Night"	Danny J Lewis	1998	29	1
"Spin Spin Sugar" (Armand's Dark Garage Mix)	Sneaker Pimps	1996	21	1
"Step 2 Me"	Grant Nelson featuring Jean McClain	1999	92	7
"Straight from the Heart"	Doolally	1998/1999	20/9	1
"Summer of Love"	Lonyo	2000	8	
"Superman"	DJ Oxide and Big Kid featuring Asher D	2000		35
"Sweeter than Wine"	Dionne Rakeem	2001	46	2
"Sweet Lies"	Nathan Dawe featuring Talia Mar	2022	61	
"Sweet like Chocolate"	Shanks & Bigfoot	1999	1	1

== T ==
Song	Artist	Year	UK chart position	UK Dance Singles	UK Independent Singles
"Take It Back"	Toddla T featuring Shola Ama and J2K	2011	59		
"Take Me by the Hand"	Oklou featuring Bladee	2025			
"Tales of the Hood"	Tubby T	2002	47	7	
"Teardrops"	Lovestation	1998	14	2	
"Tears"	Underground Solution featuring Colour Girl	1998	77	2	
"Tell Me It's Real (Club Asylum/Teebone mixes)"	K-Ci & JoJo	2000	16	4	
"The Theme"	Dreem Teem	1997	34	2	
"They Call Me"	DJ Treble T featuring MC Charlie Brown	2001	92		
"They Don't Know"	So Solid Crew	2001	3	1	
"Things Are Never"	Operator & Baffled featuring Colour Girl	1999	170		
"Think About Me"	Artful Dodger featuring Michelle Escoffery	2001	11	2	
"Thinking It Over"	Liberty	2001	5		
"Through the Night"	Bugzy Malone featuring DJ Luck & MC Neat	2017	92		
"Time After Time"	Distant Soundz	2002	20	4	
"Tonight"	PinkPantheress	2025	35		
"Too Shady"	BM Dubs	2000			49
"Touch"	Shift K3Y	2014	3	3	
"Triplets"	Sticky	2001	117		
"Trippin'"	Oris Jay presents Delsena	2002	42	2	
"True"	Jaimeson featuring Angel Blu	2003	4	3	
"True Step Tonight"	True Steppers featuring Brian Harvey and Donell Jones	2000	25	28	
"Try Me Out"	Sunship featuring Anita Kelsey	1999	88	2	
"Turn On the Lights again.."	Fred Again and Swedish House Mafia featuring Future	2022	27		
"TwentyFourSeven"	Artful Dodger featuring Melanie Blatt	2001	6		

== U ==
Song	Artist	Year	UK chart position	UK Dance Singles
"U & I"	David Howard featuring Jhay Palmer	2000	180	
"Up Middle Finger"	Oxide & Neutrino	2001	7	1

== V ==
Song	Artist	Year	UK chart position	UK Dance Singles
"Vol. 1 (What You Want What You Need)"	Industry Standard	1997	34	2

== W ==
Song	Artist	Year	UK chart position	UK Dance Singles
"The Way We Are"	Alesha Dixon	2015	—	
"We Are Da Click"	Da Click	1999	38	4
"West Ten"	AJ Tracey and Mabel	2020	5	1
"What's Going On"	Wookie	2000	45	12
"What's It Gonna Be"	H "Two" O featuring Platnum	2008	2	1
"What's It Gonna Be"	Nesha	2001	165	
"What U Do"	Colours featuring Stephen Emmanuel and Eska	1999	51	1
"What Would We Do?"	DSK	1997	55	16
"When It Rains, It Pours"	Bad Boy Chiller Crew	2022	69	26
"When the Bassline Drops"	Craig David and Big Narstie	2015	10	2
"Where's Your Love"	Craig David featuring Tinchy Stryder and Rita Ora	2008	58	
"Where You Are"	PinkPantheress featuring Willow	2022	58	
"Who"	Ed Case and Sweetie Irie	2001	29	5
"Whoomp!...There It Is"	BM Dubs presents Mr Rumble featuring Brasstooth and Kee	2001	32	4
"Who's Coming Around"	5050	2001	54	
"Who's the Bad Man?"	Dee Patten	1999	42	5
"Who You Are"	Craig David and MNEK	2021	39	
"Why?"	Mis-Teeq	2001	8	2
"Wile Out"	DJ Zinc featuring Ms. Dynamite	2010	38	4
"Woman Trouble"	Artful Dodger and Robbie Craig featuring Craig David	2000	6	
"Wondering Why"	MJ Cole featuring Vula	2003	30	1

== Y ==
Song	Artist	Year	UK chart position	UK Dance Singles
"You & Me"	Disclosure featuring Eliza Doolittle	2013	10	6
"You Didn't Expect That"	Billy Crawford	2003	35	
"Your Mind, Your Body, Your Soul"	Leee John	2000	137	
"You're Mine"	Suburban Lick	1999	198	
"You Used to Hold Me"	Scott and Leon	2000	19	5
"You Wot"	DJ Q featuring MC Bonez	2008	50	

== See also ==
- UK garage
- List of UK garage artists
