= List of UK garage artists =

This is a list of notable artists who have worked in the UK garage genre and subgenres, except dubstep and grime as they have their own lists. This includes notable artists who have either been very important to the genre or have had a considerable amount of exposure (such as in the case of one that has been on a major label and/or has had a hit song that charted). Only artists who have articles are included.

Groups and artists with aliases are listed by the first letter in their name (not including the words "a", "an" or "the"), and individuals are listed by their surname.

== 0-9 ==
- 187 Lockdown
- 3 of a Kind
- 3rd Edge

== A ==
- All About She
- AlunaGeorge
- Shola Ama
- Amira
- Architechs
- Artful Dodger
- Asher D
- A vs B

== B ==
- Katy B
- B-15 Project
- Bad Boy Chiller Crew
- Daniel Bedingfield
- BM Dubs
- Dane Bowers
- Burial

== C ==
- Ed Case
- TJ Cases
- Chanteuse
- Club Asylum
- MJ Cole
- Colour Girl
- Da Click

== D ==
- Craig David
- Roy Davis Jr.
- De Nada
- Deekline
- Tim Deluxe
- Dem 2
- Disclosure
- Distant Soundz
- DJ Cameo
- DJ EZ
- DJ Luck & MC Neat
- DJ Pied Piper and the Masters of Ceremonies
- DJ Q
- DJ S.K.T
- DJ Slimzee
- DJ Spoony
- DJ Zinc
- Double 99
- Dreem Teem

== E ==
- Todd Edwards
- El-B
- Stephen Emmanuel

== F ==
- Flava D

== G ==
- Gemma Fox
- Genius Cru
- Gorgon City

== H ==
- H "Two" O
- Harvey
- Heartless Crew
- Mark Hill
- Horsepower Productions

== I ==
- Interplanetary Criminal

== J ==
- Jaimeson
- Jamie xx

== K ==
- Kurupt FM
- Ras Kwame
- K-Warren

== L ==
- Jonny L
- Kele Le Roc
- Danny J Lewis
- Lonyo
- Loop Da Loop
- Lovestation

== M ==
- M&S
- M-Dubs
- Ladies First
- Lisa Maffia
- Mis-Teeq
- Monsta Boy
- Tina Moore
- George Morel
- Ms. Dynamite

== N ==
- Grant Nelson
- Shelley Nelson

== O ==
- Oneman
- Joy Orbison
- Oxide & Neutrino

== P ==
- Pay As U Go
- Phaeleh
- Phonetix
- Phuturistix
- Pianoman
- PinkPantheress
- Platnum

== R ==
- Dizzee Rascal
- Romeo
- Roots Manuva
- Royal-T
- Mark Ryder

== S ==
- Serious Danger
- Shanks & Bigfoot
- Shift K3Y
- Shut Up and Dance
- Silkie, also known as Solomon Rose
- Mike Skinner
- Smokin Beats
- So Solid Crew
- Aaron Soul
- Greg Stainer
- Stanton Warriors
- Sticky
- The Streets
- Sunship
- Sweet Female Attitude
- Syron

== T ==
- T2
- Teebone
- Toddla T
- Elisabeth Troy
- True Steppers
- Tru Faith & Dub Conspiracy
- Ts7
- Tubby T
- Tuff Jam

== V ==
- Armand van Helden
- Sammy Virji

== W ==
- Terri Walker
- Wideboys
- Wiley
- Wookie

== Z ==
- Zed Bias
- Zomby

== See also ==
- List of dubstep musicians
- List of grime artists
- List of UK garage songs
