= List of UK Dance Singles Chart number ones of 1998 =

These are The Official UK Charts Company UK Dance Chart number one hits of 1998. The dates listed in the menus below represent the Saturday after the Sunday the chart was announced, as per the way the dates are given in chart publications such as the ones produced by Billboard, Guinness, and Virgin.

Issue date	Song	Artist
3 January	"My Desire"	Amira
10 January	"Flaming June"	BT
17 January	""Renegade Master '98""	WildChild
24 January	"Dreams"	Smokin Beats featuring Lyn Eden
31 January	"You Make Me Feel (Mighty Real)"	Byron Stingily
7 February	"Don't Stop"	Ruff Driverz
14 February	"Meet Her at the Love Parade"	Da Hool
21 February	"Let Me Show You"	Camisra
28 February	"Make the World Go Round (2nd Remix)"	Sandy B
7 March	"Music in My Mind"	Adam F
14 March	"Watching Windows"	Roni Size & Reprazent
21 March	"The Word is Love (Say the Word)"	Voices of Life
28 March	"The Beat Goes On"	All Seeing I
4 April	"I Get Lonely"	Janet Jackson
11 April	"Love Shy"	Kristine Blond
18 April	"Turn It Up (Remix)/Fire It Up"	Busta Rhymes
25 April	"Kung-Fu"	187 Lockdown
2 May	"Tough at the Top"	E-Z Rollers
9 May	"Miles from Home"	Peshay
16 May	"Pacific/Cubik"	808 State
23 May	"Sincere"	MJ Cole
30 May	"Movin' On"	Debbie Pender
6 June	"Horny '98"	Mousse T vs. Hot N'Juicy
13 June	"Wizards of the Sonic"	WestBam vs. Red Jerry
20 June	"Spend the Night"	Danny J Lewis
27 June	"Ghetto Supastar (That Is What You Are)"	Pras Michel featuring Ol' Dirty Bastard & Mýa
4 July	"Intergalactic"	Beastie Boys
11 July	"Intergalactic"	Beastie Boys
18 July	"Breakbeat Era"	Breakbeat Era
25 July	"Café del Mar '98"	Energy 52
1 August	"Café del Mar '98"	Energy 52
8 August	"I Can't Help Myself"	Lucid
15 August	"Needin' U"	David Morales Presents The Face
22 August	"Bora Bora"	Da Hool
29 August	"Storm"	Storm
5 September	"Music is the Answer (Dancing & Prancin')"	Danny Tenaglia & Celeda
12 September	"For an Angel"	Paul Van Dyk
19 September	"For an Angel"	Paul Van Dyk
26 September	"Rainbows of Colour"	Grooverider
3 October	"Beachball"	Nalin & Kane
10 October	"1998"	Binary Finary
17 October	"Got to Get Up"	Afrika Bambaataa vs. Carpe Diem
24 October	"Destiny"	Dem 2
31 October	"20 Degrees"	Jonny L featuring Silvah Bullet
7 November	"Talkin All That Jazz"	Stetsasonic
14 November	"Straight from the Heart"	Doolally
21 November	"La"	Marc et Claude
28 November	"Up and Down"	The Vengaboys
5 December	"Dreaming"	Ruff Driverz
12 December	"Hard Knock Life"	Jay-Z
19 December	"Playin' with My Mind"	House of Glass
26 December	"Dreaming"	Ruff Driverz

== See also ==
- 1998 in music
