= Phonetix =

English electronic music producer

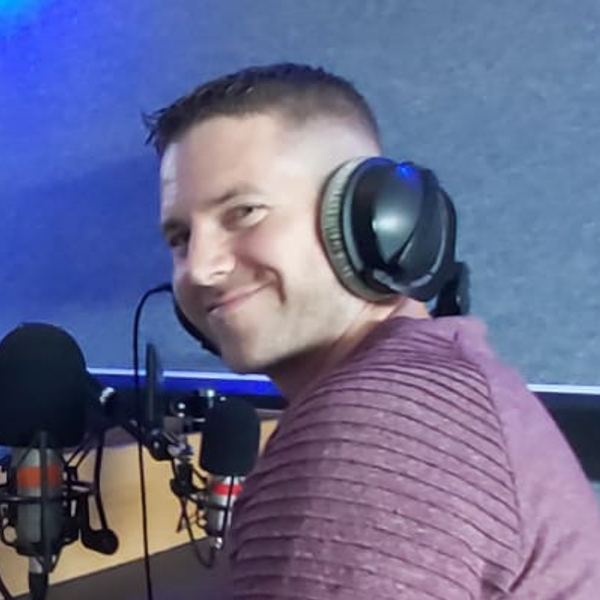
- Phonetix on Flex FM, August 2019
- Born: Robert William Thomas
- Writing career
- Pen name: Beatshotters® Huey Moré; Robbie T Soul Master; Soul'd Out; Wolverine
- Years active: 2004–present
- Genres: Electronic, UK garage
- Notable work: Jazz Step FM; 2002 EP
- Website: www.phonetix.co.uk

Robert William Thomas, known professionally as Phonetix (/fəʊˈnɛtɪks/), is an English electronic music producer, DJ, radio personality, podcaster and label executive.

== Early life ==
Thomas started playing the piano at age four. During his teens, he received some inheritance money, which he used to build a small home studio. Inspired by the production work of Dr. Dre, he began recording hip hop beats as a means to distract him from issues he was having at school.

== Career ==
Then known as Robbie T, Thomas' career began in the early 2000s when some of his music received support from UK garage DJ, EZ on Kiss FM. He recorded under a number of names (including Soul Master and Wolverine) until 2007/8, after which point he mostly worked as Phonetix.

=== Jazz Step FM ===
Thomas is perhaps best known for pioneering a blend of 2-step and jazz - for which he has come to be known as "Mr Jazz Step". Drawing comparisons to MJ Cole, this style formed the basis for his 2021 album Jazz Step FM. Reviews of the album were favourable, with writers drawing parallels between Thomas's work and that of Dave Koz and Mark Ronson. Thomas himself cites Japanese producer Mondo Grosso's album MG4 as an important precursor to his "jazz step".

=== Other releases ===
In March 2007, Thomas self-released the Hairy Kutz Vol. 1 EP on his label Hairy Kutz. Writing a guest review for DJ Mag, respected peers Control-S featured the release as their Dancefloor Destroyer and identified it as an essential purchase. In a 2018 interview broadcast by Flex FM Thomas explained that in spite of extensive airplay on BBC Radio 1, Kiss FM and BBC Radio 1xtra, the EP was a commercial failure after a botched pressing led to a recall which invalidated the promotional work undertaken ahead of its release.

In 2008 Thomas was commissioned to produce the radio edit for a re-release of Genius Cru's 2000 UK Garage classic Boom Selection. A video for this version of the track received notable support on MTV Base.

In the November 2009 edition of DJ Mag, Thomas' remix of the single "You Belong to Me" by Canadian artist Sumeet was selected as the month's essential purchase. The track went on to feature on the Ministry of Sound compilation Addicted to Bass: Winter 2009 - which was certified silver in 2013 after attaining 60,000 sales.

In 2011, Thomas self-released an album entitled Vinyl & Voicemails. The album compiled a number of tracks in varying styles, recorded under several guises over a six-year period.

Thomas became the first artist to secure a UK garage release on Dutch record label Spinnin' Records in 2015, when he produced a 2-step remix of Joe Stone and Montell Jordan's "The Party (This Is How We Do It)".

2015 also saw him undertake a remix of Therese's "Missing Disco" for Vixon Records.

In 2019, Thomas released the multi-genre album 27 Months to raise funds in order to take his poorly daughter to America. The album featured garage, house, drum and bass and jazz tracks; and received notable support from respected artists like the Wideboys, DJ Q and Kissy Sell Out as well as record label Hospital Records.

Released in 2021, the 2002 EP was noted by one publication as having received a "fantastic" response from DJs and garage fans alike.

=== Reception ===
Thomas's skills have been mentioned in DJ Mag with high esteem on multiple occasions throughout his career - firstly as a skilled up-'n-comer by Philippa Reed and Charlie Sezz., later as "man-of-the-moment" by Control-S

An article published in late 2021 by 3000 Blog named Thomas as one of the top 10 garage producers - citing an impressive level of consistency throughout his career.

In 2021, a feature celebrating the anniversary of seminal UK garage label Nuvolve Music noted Thomas as one of its stars. When interviewed, Thomas thanked DJ EZ for his continued support and stated that releasing music through his label made him feel like things had "gone full circle".

Thomas has been praised for taking a refreshingly sophisticated and musical approach to contemporary stylings, with reference made to social media videos showing him performing a number of live instruments during the recording of his works.

In August 2023, Thomas was invited to perform in the BBC's Live Lounge. He was accompanied by vocalist and long-time collaborator Harsh. At one point during the broadcast, presenter Melita Dennett enthusiastically announced that a crowd had gathered outside the building and were dancing in the street.

== Discography ==
=== Albums ===
- Vinyl & Voicemails (2011)
- 27 Months (2019)
- 27 Months: The Remixes (2019)
- Jazz Step FM (2021)

=== EPs ===
- Hairy Kutz Vol. 1 (2007)
- 2002 EP (2021)
- Don't Be Afraid / What Do You See (2021)

=== Singles ===
- "The Mac" (2020)
- "Benito Miguel" (2020)
- "Be OK" (2021)
- "Heartbreak" (2021)
- "Snowfall" (2022)

=== Remixes ===
- "Boom Selection (Phonetix Edit)" (2008)
- "You Belong to Me (Phonetix Maximum Bass Dub)" (2009)
- "The Party (This Is How We Do It) (Phonetix Mix)" (2015)
- "Missing Disco (Phonetix 2 Step Remix)" (2015)

== In other media ==
Thomas runs garage and house label Riddler Records. He has also been involved with the running of several other garage labels (including Hairy Kutz, Strictly Flava, Nine2 Recordings, LAM, Hot Box Records, AI Records and You Know), and also runs a publishing company, Riddler Publishing.

In April 2007, Thomas appeared as a guest reviewer for DJ Mag.

In 2013, he began working as a mix engineer, also undertaking some mastering work.

Alongside Sub.FM's Mr Brainz, Thomas hosted a topical UK garage themed podcast, "In the Garage" throughout 2021 and 2022. Whilst it was being published regularly, he began broadcasting the "Garage Essentials" show on Brighton-based Trickstar Radio. When "In the Garage" ceased being published, Thomas began releasing "Garage Essentials" as a podcast.

In a 2022 interview, Thomas referenced his work as Beatshotters®. His LinkedIn profile details him as CEO and executive producer of the beatleasing team.

Thomas has been outspoken on social media in support of the LGBTQ community with a particular focus on gender fluidity, condemning those who mock or dismiss those who don't identify as male or female.
