= List of UK R&B Singles Chart number ones of 1998 =

The UK R&B Chart is a weekly chart that ranks the 40 biggest-selling singles and albums that are classified in the R&B genre in the United Kingdom. The chart is compiled by the Official Charts Company, and is based on physical and other physical formats. This is a list of the UK's biggest R&B hits of 1998.

== Number ones ==
Key
†	Best-selling R&B single of the year

Issue date	Single	Artist
3 January	"Never Ever"	All Saints
10 January	"Never Ever"	All Saints
17 January	"Never Ever"	All Saints
24 January	"Never Ever"	All Saints
31 January	"You Make Me Wanna..."	Usher
7 February	"You Make Me Wanna..."	Usher
14 February	"Cleopatra's Theme"	Cleopatra
21 February	"Never Ever"	All Saints
28 February	"Be Alone No More"	Another Level
7 March	"Show Me Love"	Robyn
14 March	"Holler"	Ginuwine
21 March	"Be Alone No More"	Another Level
28 March	"No, No, No"	Destiny's Child
4 April	"I Get Lonely"	Janet Jackson
11 April	"I Get Lonely"	Janet Jackson
18 April	"Turn It Up (Remix)/Fire It Up"	Busta Rhymes
25 April	"Turn It Up (Remix)/Fire It Up"	Busta Rhymes
2 May	"Turn It Up (Remix)/Fire It Up"	Busta Rhymes
9 May	"Under the Bridge"	All Saints
16 May	"Gone till November"	Wyclef Jean
23 May	"Gone till November"	Wyclef Jean
30 May	"Under the Bridge"	All Saints
6 June	"The Boy Is Mine"	Brandy and Monica
13 June	"The Boy Is Mine"	Brandy and Monica
20 June	"Life"	Des'ree
27 June	"Ghetto Supastar (That Is What You Are)" †	Pras
4 July	"Intergalactic"	Beastie Boys
11 July	"Ghetto Supastar (That Is What You Are)" †	Pras
18 July	"Freak Me"	Another Level
25 July	"Deeper Underground"	Jamiroquai
1 August	"Just the Two of Us"	Will Smith
8 August	"Come with Me"	Puff Daddy featuring Jimmy Page
15 August	"Ghetto Supastar (That Is What You Are)" †	Pras
22 August	"Everything's Gonna Be Alright"	Sweetbox
29 August	"Everything's Gonna Be Alright"	Sweetbox
5 September	"Finally Found"	Honeyz
12 September	"Bootie Call"	All Saints
19 September	"Bootie Call"	All Saints
26 September	"I Want You Back"	Mel B featuring Missy Elliott
3 October	"Doo Wop (That Thing)"	Lauryn Hill
10 October	"Top of the World"	Brandy
17 October	"The First Night"	Monica
24 October	"How Deep Is Your Love"	Dru Hill
31 October	"Little Bit of Lovin'"	Kele Le Roc
7 November	"Blue Angels"	Pras
14 November	"Each Time"	E-17
21 November	"Each Time"	E-17
28 November	"Each Time"	E-17
5 December	"Miami"	Will Smith
12 December	"Hard Knock Life (Ghetto Anthem)"	Jay-Z
19 December	"Hard Knock Life (Ghetto Anthem)"	Jay-Z
26 December	"End of the Line"	Honeyz

== See also ==
- List of UK Dance Singles Chart number ones of 1998
- List of UK Independent Singles Chart number ones of 1998
- List of UK Rock & Metal Singles Chart number ones of 1998
- List of UK R&B Albums Chart number ones of 1998
