= Bump and grind =

Bump and Grind or bump-and-grind may refer to one of the following:

== Types of dance and music ==
- Bump and grind (dance style)
- Music, and occasionally dance, associated with striptease

== Musical works ==
=== Albums ===
- Bump 'n' Grind, a 1973 album by Jackson Heights, or the title track
- Bump 'n' Grind, a 1992 album by The 69 Eyes
- Bump 'n' Grind, a compilation album by Marc Bolan

=== Songs ===
- "Bump n' Grind" (R. Kelly song)", 1993
- "Bump 'n' Grind (I Am Feeling Hot Tonight)", a 2000 song by M-Dubs
- "Bump and Grind", a song by David Lee Roth from the 1986 album Eat 'Em and Smile
- "Bump and Grind", a song by Wendy O. Williams from the 1984 album WOW
