= Flyby =

Flyby may refer to:

- Flypast or flyover, a celebratory display or ceremonial flight
- Flyby (spaceflight), a spaceflight operation
- Planetary flyby, a type of flyby mission
- Gravity assist or swing-by, a type of flyby making use of the gravity field of a passed celestial body
- Fly-by, circuit topology used in DDR3 SDRAM memory technology

== Music ==
- Flybys (album), a 2003 album by The Curtains
- "Fly By" or "Fly By II", a 2001 song by English boy band Blue
- "Fly Bi", a 2000 UK garage song by Teebone featuring MC Kie & MC Sparks

== See also ==
- Fly-by-wire, electrically signaled flight control systems
- Flybuys (disambiguation)
