= Kisses Sweeter than Wine (disambiguation) =

"Kisses Sweeter than Wine" is a song by The Weavers.

Kisses Sweeter than Wine may also refer to:

- "Kisses Sweeter Than Wine" (Frasier), series 3, episode 5
- Kisses Sweeter than Wine, the autobiography of Boyd Clack

== See also ==
- "Sweeter than Wine", a 2001 single by Dionne Rakeem
