= Mr Brainz =

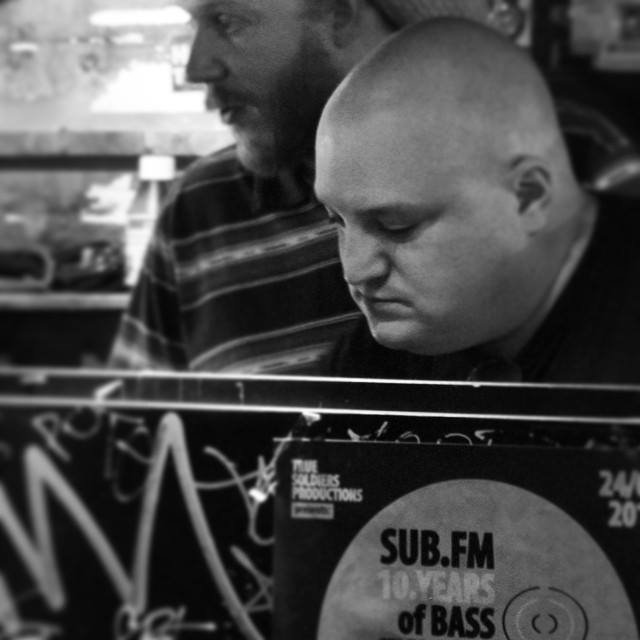
- Mr Brainz at the Sub.FM 10 Years of Bass event in Amsterdam, 2014.

Background information
- Born: Gregory Morris; Hackney, London, England
- Origin: Chingford, Waltham Forest, London, England
- Genres: 2-step garage; garage; bass; grime; breaks
- Occupations: DJ; podcaster; record label owner; web developer
- Instruments: Sequencer; samplers; drum machine; personal computer; turntables
- Years active: 2000–present
- Labels: SnF:Lo-FI; Blaq
- Website: djbrainz.com

Gregory Morris (born 17 May 1982), known as Mr Brainz, is an English electronic music DJ and producer from London. He currently has a radio show on popular underground internet radio station Sub.FM which is broadcast every two weeks. Mr Brainz is the founder of several websites including UK garage community Slick n Fresh and social DJ promotion tool TunePushr. He exposed SoundCloud's close relationship with Universal Music Group after the story of his paid-for SoundCloud account being terminated went viral in 2014.

== Music ==
=== Sub.FM show and podcast ===
Since 2010, Mr Brainz has held a fortnightly radio show on popular underground internet radio station Sub.FM. The show airs on Saturdays 3PM - 5PM GMT. The show is subsequently podcasted the day after under the Bumpy UK Garage with DJ Brainz brand. The show is listed as playing "brand new underground garage & bass". The podcast has featured in the "What's Hot" section of iTunes podcasts.

=== Previous radio shows ===
Mr Brainz first DJed on former London pirate radio station London Underground 89.4fm, a station that was a springboard for many well known UK garage acts including Tuff Jam, MJ Cole, Qualifide, Dubz4Klubz and Rossi B & Luca. Mr Brainz hosted the show alongside DJ Pinky, and the duo went by the name Pinky and the Brain. The show aired between 1999 and 2002.

Between 2004 and 2010, Mr Brainz DJed on the iTunes radio-listed Pressure Radio.

=== Music production ===
Since 2012, Mr Brainz has released music as part of a production duo under Orpheus:ldn in collaboration with an artist known as Muad'dib. The music has been described as "beautifully charming" with a "dark tone".

=== Acknowledgements ===
Mr Brainz is thanked in the sleeve of Pure Garage mixed by FooR which was released in May 2017. FooR cite him amongst others for "helping us compile the best possible shortlist of tracks for this album!".

== SoundCloud controversy ==
On 3 July 2014, TorrentFreak reported that SoundCloud offered unlimited removal powers to certain copyright holders, allowing those copyright holders to remove paid subscribers' content without avenue to contest and dispute wrongful deletions. The source of this article was based on Mr Brainz sharing his email communication between SoundCloud support staff with music blog Do Androids Dance.

The email chain between Mr Brainz and the SoundCloud support team revealed that the account was terminated due to being in violation of copyright restrictions three times. The source material was recordings of Mr Brainz's radio shows that were uploaded to the SoundCloud service to a paid-for account. Mr Brainz argued that many high-profile artists such as Marc Kinchen, Skrillex, Steve Angello and Hannah Wants had similar content on their accounts and pointed out that there were different rules depending on notoriety. The argument was unsuccessful and the account was still terminated.

After SoundCloud stated that they "do not offer refunds to [...] accounts [that are] terminated as a result of repeat infringement," Mr Brainz claimed that SoundCloud stole his money by not providing the service he paid for. The SoundCloud Terms of Use state that they "do not offer refunds to subscription account holders whose accounts are terminated as a result of repeated infringement or any violation of these Terms of Use or our Community Guidelines." After publishing the details of the exchange on the internet, Mr Brainz was refunded his last month's subscription into his bank account and posted a screenshot of the transaction as listed on his online bank statement.

The media coverage of the incident caused SoundCloud to release an official statement on copyright claims, sent directly to Mixmag. It read:

As a responsible hosting platform, we work hard to ensure that everyone's rights are respected. In the case of rights holders, that means having processes in place to ensure that any content posted without authorisation is removed quickly and efficiently. In the case of users, that means having separate processes in place to ensure that any content removed in error can be reinstated equally quickly. If any user believes that content has been removed in error - for example, because they had the necessary permissions from Universal Music and/or any other rights holder - then they are free to dispute the takedown.

In an article for Wired Germany that was covering the rise of SoundCloud, Mr Brainz was quoted in regards to the controversy after being interviewed by journalist Sören Kittel.

The original article published to Do Androids Dance has since been removed from the web after merging into parent entity Complex Media.

The event was parodied on music news parody site Wunderground, who wrote an article titled "Universal Music & SoundCloud Copyright the Entire Spectrum of Sound".

== Discography ==
=== With Orpheus:ldn ===
- The Connected (2012)
- A Picture (2016)

=== As featured artist ===
- Mokujin featuring Mr Brainz - "AM/PM" (2014)
