= Homebrew (Neneh Cherry album) =

Studio album by Neneh Cherry
- Released: 26 October 1992
- Studio: Cherry Bear Studios (London, UK); Cherry Bear Mobile; Grapehouse Studio (Copenhagen, Denmark); Power Play Studios (New York, NY)
- Genre: Hip hop; R&B; dance; pop
- Length: 42:43
- Label: Circa
- Producer: Booga Bear; Gang Starr; Geoff Barrow; Jonny Dollar; JT; Michael Stipe; Neneh Cherry; Twilight Firm

Neneh Cherry chronology
Raw Like Sushi (1989)	Homebrew (1992)	Man (1996)

Singles from Homebrew
- 1. "Money Love" Released: 21 September 1992; 2. "Move with Me" Released: 1992; 3. "Buddy X" Released: 7 June 1993

Homebrew is the second studio album by Swedish musician Neneh Cherry. It was released in 1992 via Circa Records. The album features several different genres, including hip hop, R&B, dance, and pop. The album photography was by Jean-Baptiste Mondino. Recording sessions took place at Cherry Bear Studios in London and at the Cherry Bear Mobile, except "Sassy" was additionally recorded at Grapehouse Studios in Copenhagen and "Trout" was additionally recorded at Power Play Studios in New York. Gang Starr co-wrote and produced "Sassy" and "I Ain't Gone Under Yet". Geoff Barrow wrote and produced "Somedays".

"Trout" features a guitar riff replayed by Jonny Dollar from Steppenwolf's version of "The Pusher", and the drum track by John Bonham from Led Zeppelin's "When the Levee Breaks". "Buddy X" was allegedly inspired by Lenny Kravitz. It was later remixed by Falcon & Fabian and featured the Notorious B.I.G. and also remixed by the Dreem Teem and Masters at Work. The track "Move with Me" later appeared on the soundtrack of the 1993 film Sliver, while a dub version of the song appears on the soundtrack of the 1991 Wim Wenders film Until the End of the World. The track "Red Paint" is a reinterpretation of a true story told to Neneh by her late mother Moki Cherry.

== Singles ==
Two singles were released from Homebrew worldwide: "Money Love" and "Buddy X". "Money Love" charted within the top 40 of various countries while "Buddy X" became Cherry's third top-50 hit in the United States. In Germany, a third single—"Move with Me"—was also released. Meanwhile, a fourth song, "Trout", received heavy airplay on US alternative radio; despite never being released as a single, it peaked at number two on the Billboard Modern Rock Tracks chart in January 1993.

== Critical reception ==
Professional ratings
Review scores
Source	Rating
AllMusic	4.5/5 stars
Chicago Tribune	3.5/4 stars
Entertainment Weekly	B+
Los Angeles Times	3.5/4 stars
NME	7/10
Q	4/5 stars
Rolling Stone	4/5 stars
Spin Alternative Record Guide	8/10
The Village Voice	B+
Vox	9/10

In the Los Angeles Times, Connie Johnson said that although Homebrew lacks the "power of surprise" of its predecessor Raw Like Sushi (1989), Cherry's blend of "soul, rap and hip-hop with an alternative slant" remains "wholly unique". Chicago Tribune critic Greg Kot wrote that Cherry's music "defies categorization", while her "post-feminist view is an appealing combination of resilience and compassion." Mark Coleman of Rolling Stone found that while her debut often sounded "a tad too conceptual, more compelling in theory than practice", Homebrew "supplies the opposite effect", with Cherry more effectively switching between rapping and singing. In a retrospective review for AllMusic, Alex Henderson called it as "equally magnificent and risk-taking" as Raw Like Sushi, noting its "unorthodox" hybrid of genres and Cherry's alternately "humorous" and "quite pointed" reflections on "relationships and social issues".

Robert Christgau, reviewing for The Village Voice, deemed Homebrew more impressive musically than lyrically, but noted that Cherry had "marked out a meaningful piece of turf: sophisticated secondhand homegirl, personally decent and artistically accessible". Ian McCann viewed it as an "alluring" albeit "flawed" record in NME, summarising it as sounding "like the best demos you ever heard".

== Track listing ==
No.	Title	Writer(s)	Producer(s)	Length
1.	"Sassy" (featuring Guru)	Neneh Mariann Karlsson; Keith Elam; Cameron McVey; Chris Martin	Neneh Cherry; Jonny Dollar; Booga Bear; Gang Starr	2:33
2.	"Money Love" (featuring J$)	Karlsson; Jonathan Sharp; McVey	Neneh Cherry; Jonny Dollar; Booga Bear	3:39
3.	"Move with Me"	Karlsson; McVey	Neneh Cherry; Jonny Dollar; Booga Bear	5:18
4.	"I Ain't Gone Under Yet"	Karlsson; Elam; McVey; Martin	Neneh Cherry; Jonny Dollar; Booga Bear; Gang Starr	4:03
5.	"Twisted"	Karlsson; McVey	Neneh Cherry; Jonny Dollar; Booga Bear; Twilight Firm	4:37
6.	"Buddy X"	Karlsson; McVey	Neneh Cherry; Jonny Dollar; Booga Bear	2:49
7.	"Somedays"	Karlsson; McVey; Geoff Barrow	Neneh Cherry; Jonny Dollar; Booga Bear; Geoff Barrow	3:35
8.	"Trout" (featuring Michael Stipe)	Karlsson; Michael Stipe; Sharp; McVey	Neneh Cherry; Jonny Dollar; Booga Bear; Michael Stipe	5:03
9.	"Peace in Mind"	Karlsson; McVey	Neneh Cherry; Jonny Dollar; Booga Bear; JT for Ronin Inc.	5:34
10.	"Red Paint"	Karlsson; McVey	Neneh Cherry; Jonny Dollar; Booga Bear	5:28
Total length:				46:06

Notes

- Some editions list Buddy X, Somedays and Red Paint as "Buddy X (Inspired By……!?!)", "Somedays (The Sunday Song)" and "Red Paint (Inspired By Moki Cherry)".
- Some editions include a brief spoken skit before "Money Love"

== Charts ==
Chart performance for Homebrew
Chart (1992–1993)	Peak position
Australian Albums (ARIA)	49
Dutch Albums (Album Top 100)	48
European Albums (Music & Media)	64
New Zealand Albums (RMNZ)	43
Swedish Albums (Sverigetopplistan)	29
Swiss Albums (Schweizer Hitparade)	16
UK Albums (OCC)	27
