= Disrespectful =

Disrespectful may refer to:

- "Disrespectful" (song), a 2007 song by Chaka Khan featuring Mary J. Blige
- Disrespectful (mixtape), a 2022 mixtape by Bad Boy Chiller Crew
- "Disrespectful", a song by Doja Cat from Scarlet 2 Claude, 2024

== See also ==
- Contempt
