= Girls Like Us (B-15 Project song) =

2000 single by B-15 Project

Single by B-15 Project featuring Crissy D and Lady G
- Released: 5 June 2000
- Genre: 2-step garage; dance-pop
- Length: 5:58
- Label: Relentless, Oracabessa
- Songwriters: Angus Campbell, Janice Fyffe, Dawnette Angelita Nevers, Brian Travers
- Producers: Angus Campbell, Ian Wallman

B-15 Project singles chronology
"Strawberries" / "Soundboy" (1999)	"Girls Like Us" (2000)	"Feels So Good" (2001)

"Girls Like Us" is a song by UK garage duo B-15 Project featuring Crissy D and Lady G on vocals. Based on Crissy D and Lady G's song "Girls Like Us" from the dancehall compilation album Oracabessa One (1998), the song was a top-10 hit in the UK, peaking at number seven on the UK Singles Chart. It also reached number one on the UK Dance Singles Chart and number 22 in the Netherlands. Mixmag included "Girls Like Us" in their list of "40 of the best UK garage tracks released from 1995 to 2005", while Gemtracks included the song in their list of the "top UK garage songs between 1995–2005".

== Track listings ==
UK and Australian CD single

1. "Girls Like Us" (original radio edit)
2. "Girls Like Us" (original full length version)
3. "Girls Like Us" (Artful Dodger remix)
4. "Girls Like Us" (Sharp 'House Rage' remix)
5. "Girls Like Us" (CD ROM video and hyperlink)

UK cassette single

1. "Girls Like Us" (radio edit)
2. "Girls Like Us" (full length version)
3. "Girls Like Us" (Artful Dodger remix)
4. "Girls Like Us" (Sharp 'House Rage' remix)

UK 12-inch single

A1. "Girls Like Us" (original full length version)
A2. "Girls Like Us" (Artful Dodger remix)
B1. "Girls Like Us" (Zed Bias remix)
B2. "Girls Like Us" (Sharp 'House Rage' remix)

== Charts ==
=== Weekly charts ===
Chart (2000)	Peak position
Europe (Eurochart Hot 100)	34
Netherlands (Dutch Top 40)	22
Netherlands (Single Top 100)	48
Scotland Singles (OCC)	35
UK Singles (OCC)	7
UK Dance (OCC)	1

=== Year-end charts ===
Chart (2000)	Position
UK Singles (OCC)	163

== Release history ==
Region	Date	Format(s)	Label(s)	Ref.
United Kingdom	5 June 2000	12-inch vinyl; CD; cassette	Relentless; Oracabessa	
Australia	25 September 2000	CD	EMI Australia	
