= Lady G =

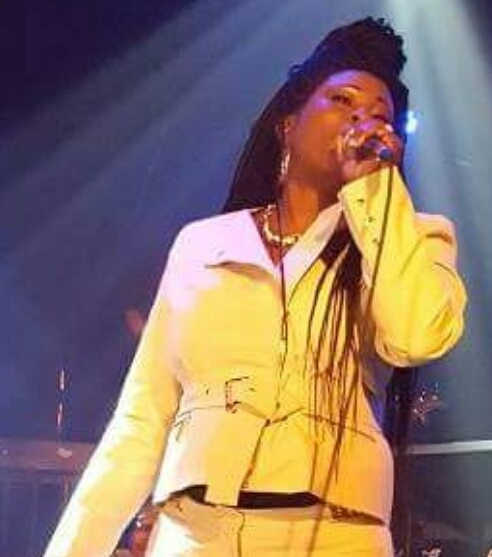
- Lady G in 2016

Background information
- Born: Janice Fyffe; 7 May 1968 (age 58); Spanish Town, Jamaica
- Origin: Jamaica
- Genres: Dancehall, reggae
- Occupations: Deejay, singer
- Years active: 1984–present

Janice Fyffe (born 7 May 1968), known as Lady G, is a Jamaican dancehall and reggae deejay. She is widely recognised as a dancehall veteran and pioneer.

== Early life ==
Born in Spanish Town in the parish of St. Catherine, Jamaica, Fyffe attended St. Joseph High School and Dunoon Technical School.

Her father is reggae singer Ken Fyffe, who has toured with the Congos and worked with vintage reggae groups the Sparkles and the Eternals.

As a child she used to sneak out of the house to travel round the island with renowned soundsystem Black Scorpio. After leaving school, Lady G met dancehall deejay Lord Sassafrass, who became her mentor.

She currently lives in New Jersey, United States.

== Music career ==
Lady G is probably best known for her first hit, "Nuff Respect", produced by Gussie Clarke in 1988. In the same year, Lady G recorded two popular songs in combination with Papa San: "Legal Rights" and "Round Table Talk".

In successive years in the late 1980s, Lady G caused a stir with her performances at the infamous Sting stageshow in Jamaica. In 1988, she appeared in a clash with Lady Mackerel, Sister Charmaine and Junie Ranks. In 1989, she clashed once more with Sister Charmaine, as well as Patra and Lady P.

In 1994, Lady G began working with Danny Browne and his Main Street label, and in 1997 the partnership resulted in the hit single "Breeze Off" on the Filthy riddim, the same instrumental used by Mr. Vegas for his international smash "Heads High". In 1997, she recorded "Man a Bad Man" for the film Third World Cop.

In 1998, Lady G and Crissy D featured on the compilation album Oracabessa One with the song "Girls Like Us" which was reworked into a UK garage version by UK duo B-15 Project, also titled "Girls Like Us". This version reached No. 7 on the UK Singles Chart in 2000. In July 2001, Lady G performed to great acclaim at the Splash! festival in Chemnitz, Germany.

In 2002, she formed her own production company, G-String, with her brother. G-String productions released the Bellyskin Riddim (featuring Sizzla, Capleton and Ce'cile) through Greensleeves Records and the Flava Riddim (featuring Macka Diamond, Lady Saw and Sizzla) distributed by VP Records.

Lady G performed at Tony Rebel's Rebel Salute 2020 festival which drew much praise from audience, organisers and media alike.

Lady G was recognised by the Jamaica Reggae Industry Association (JaRIA) with an 'Iconic Artiste in the Music Industry' award in February 2020. Buju Banton and Shabba Ranks were also honoured at the same event.

== Discography ==
=== Charted singles ===
List of charted singles, showing year released, chart positions and album name
Title	Year	Peak chart position	Album
Title	Year	JAM Air.	Album
"Thank You" (with Chevelle Franklyn)	1995	2	God Daughter
