= DJ Dextrous =

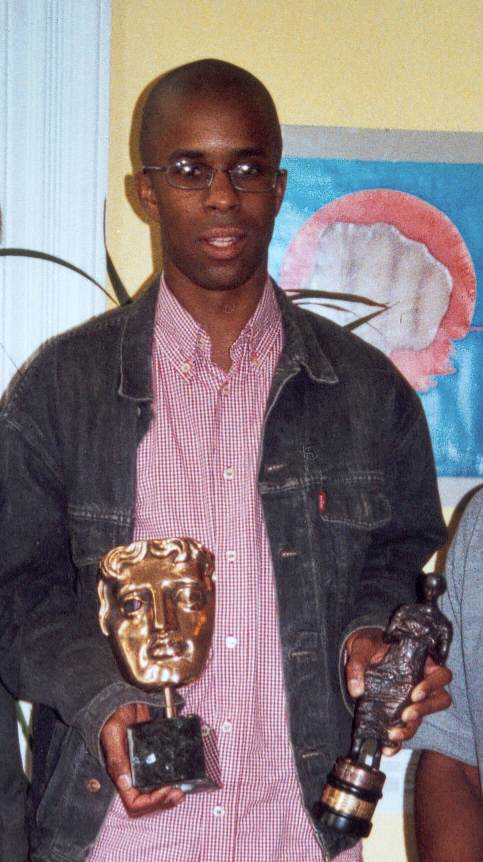

Background information
- Born: Errol Francis
- Origin: United Kingdom
- Genres: Jungle; drum and bass; electronic
- Occupations: DJ; record producer; songwriter
- Years active: 1987–present
- Labels: State of the Art; Subversive; King of the Jungle; Suburban Base; Renegade; Creative Source; Sony; Subliminal; Shut Up and Dance; Reinforced; Dynamite Joint; Karma Giraffe; Narcotix; Phuturistic Bluez; Genetic Stress; Moving Shadow

Errol Francis, better known as DJ Dextrous, is a British DJ, record producer and songwriter.

== Personal life ==
Dextrous was born and raised in Stoke Newington, London Borough of Hackney, London, England. He was classmates with DJ Hype and Smiley and PJ from the group Shut Up and Dance, and DJed at Brooke House Secondary School, where he played trumpet in the brass band, and sang in the school choir. Rude Boy Keith, his partner from their King of the Jungle record label also attended the boys school at the same time, as well as Daddy Earl (twin brother of Smiley and DJ Hype's MC).

== Career ==
Dextrous took his DJing up a gear when he started to play at parties and small clubs in 1987. At around the same time, he began putting his studio together, based around an Atari 520STFM, Casio HT3000 keyboard, Casio CZ-101 Synth and Yamaha TX7 Sound Module. He released his first record in 1992, on Ruff Quality Recordings (the sister label of Shut Up and Dance Records) entitled "Ruffneck Biznizz" which topped the Kiss FM House charts. This track was one of the precursors to the jungle scene, with its sped up breakbeats and reggae/dub basslines. In 1993, Dextrous met Teebone and they started producing together under a number of aliases including Fusion Forum, producing tracks like "Vintage Keys" and "Summer Mist", on Reinforced Records.

=== Music labels ===
Dextrous decided to start his own label, King of the Jungle Records, with Rude Boy Keith (real name Keith Lawrence), who was working for Shut Up and Dance at the time, and who also attended Brooke House School during the time Dextrous, DJ Hype, Smiley and PJ were there. Dextrous and Rude Boy Keith also became a DJ and MC double act that travelled far and wide, spreading their sound through dubplate specials and PA-ing their latest recordings. During that time, the pair signed to Suburban Base to release Da Kings of the Jungle trilogy. Dextrous was one of the leading lights within the ever-growing jungle scene, and could also be heard on Sunday mornings playing on Kool FM, one of the main pirate radio stations in London.

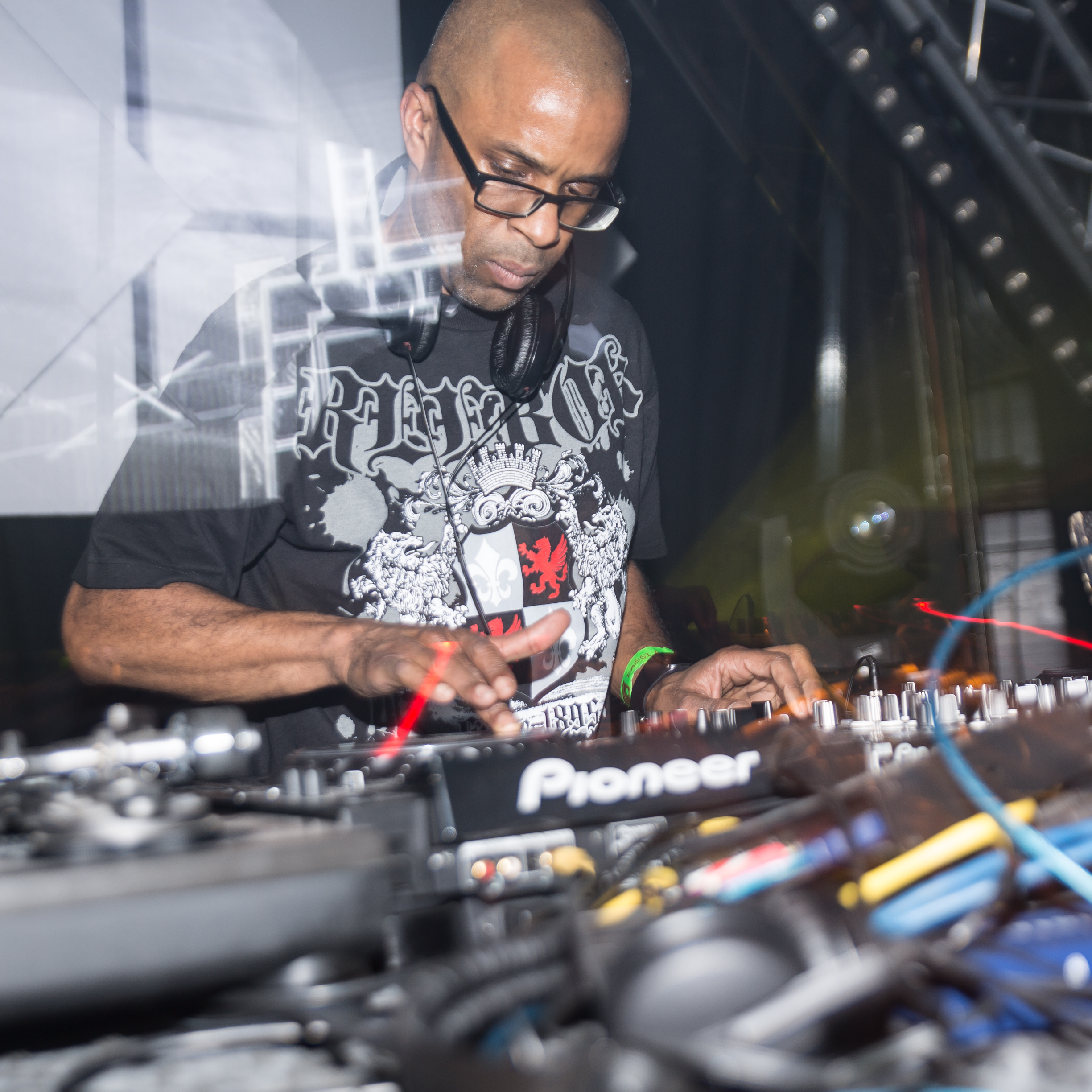
DJ Dextrous playing in Switzerland in 2015

Never one to keep still, Dextrous parted company with the radio station and then subsequently King of the Jungle Records in 1995. By then, he had already launched two further record labels, State of the Art Recordings alongside partners Paul Brown and Jon Stewart, and Subversive Recordings (formerly Subliminal Recordings) which featured a number of collaborations with longtime production partner Teebone including "Selectors Roll" which featured on the Suburban Base compilation album, Drum & Bass Selection 3 (The Dub Plate Selection) and Top Gun. These labels allowed Dextrous further creative freedom, the former being his platform to express his jazz roots. As a trio, Paul, Jon and Dex recorded under the moniker Solid State. Collectively, they have been credited as one of the pioneers of the liquid funk scene.

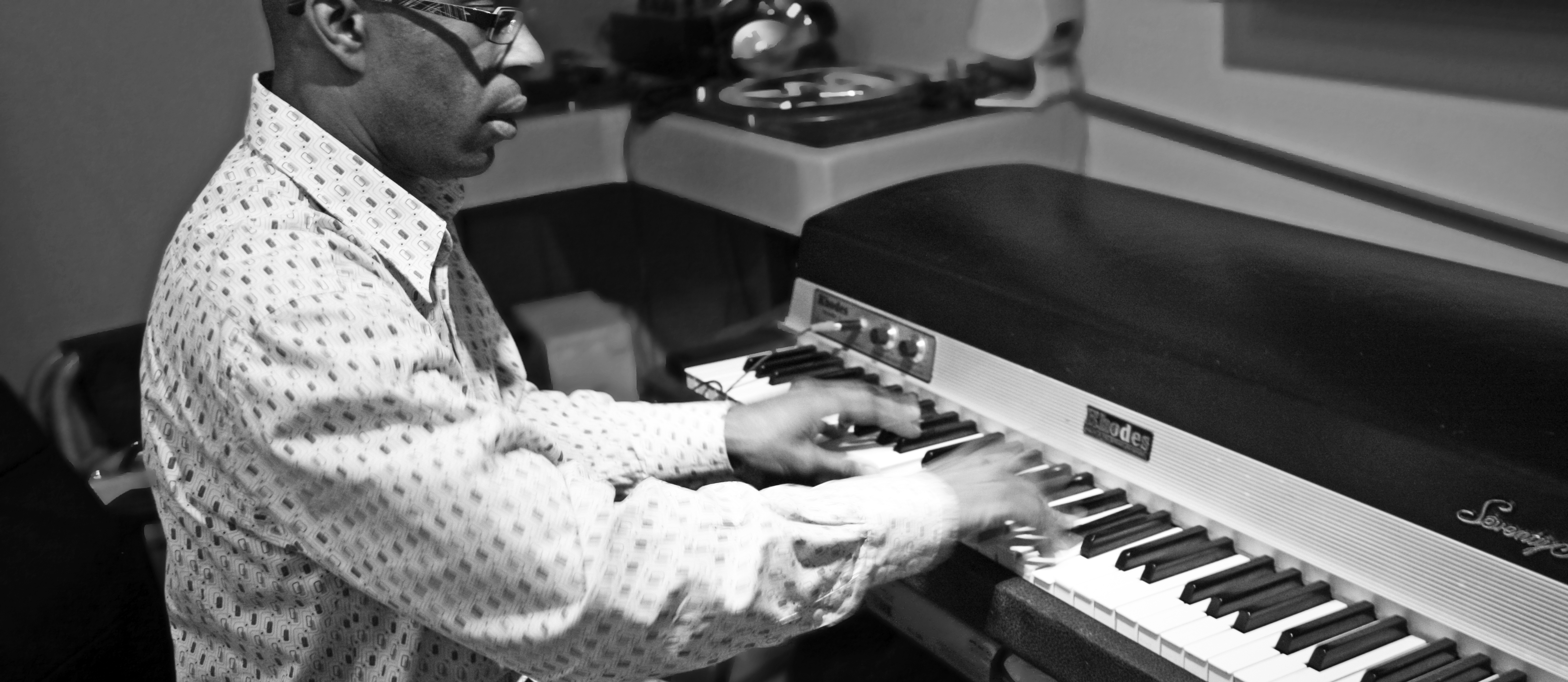
Dextrous playing Rhodes in the studio in 2012

Together they created the sound they branded "urban fusion" to cover all of the creative influences evident in their music, including jazz, dub, Detroit techno, garage, funk and reggae. During this time, Solid State recorded for Fabio's Creative Source label as well as Renegade Recordings and Alan McGee's Eruption Records (Creation Records' sister label).

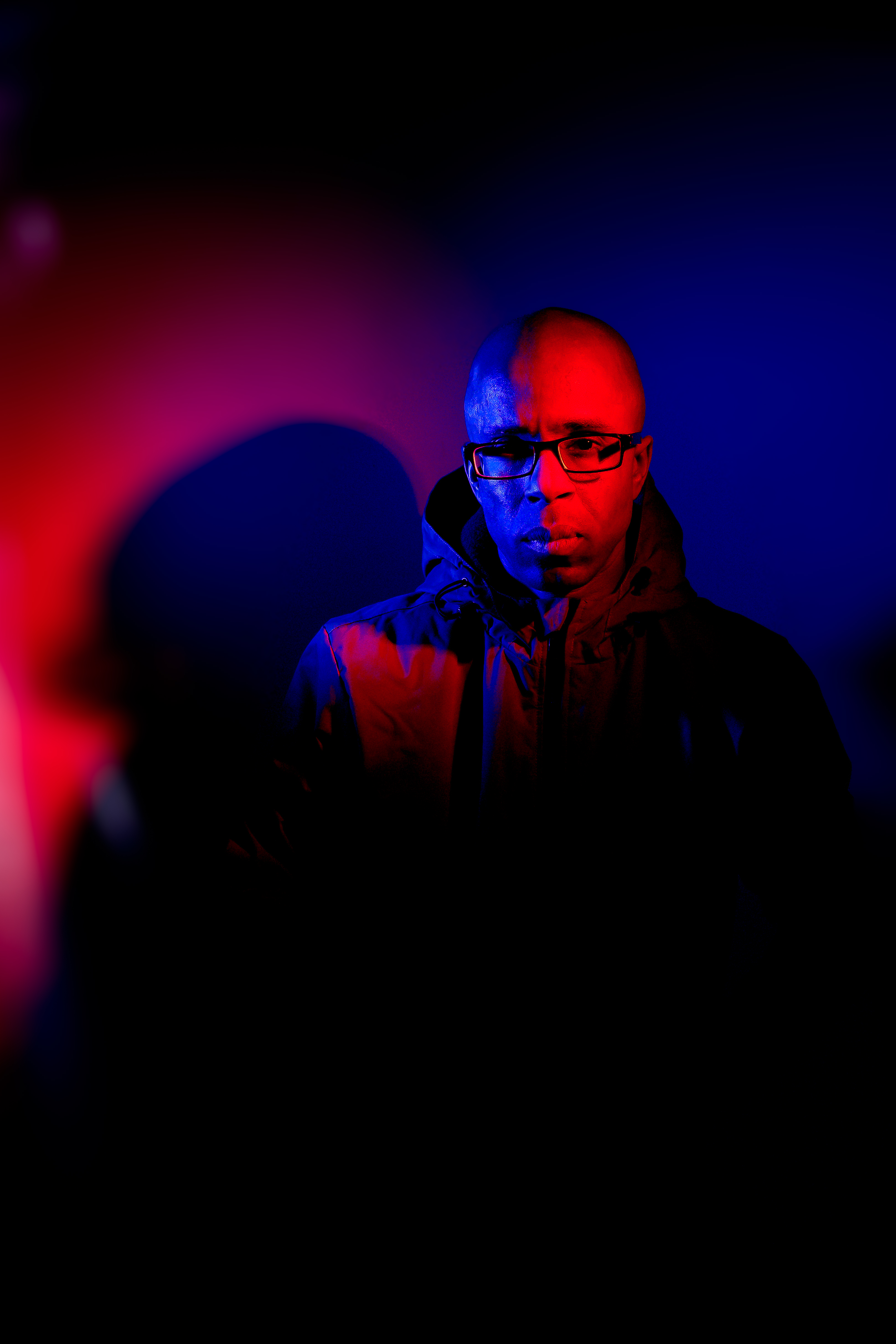
Dextrous press shot

=== Aliases ===
Dextrous has recorded drum and bass/jungle and several other genres including broken beats, UK garage, nu jazz, R&B, dub and jazz fusion under many aliases:

- Transcendent Minds
- Solid State
- DJ Rus De Tox
- Forbidden Zone
- Fusion Forum
- Retro-Spec
- Da Kings of the Jungle
- Back2Back
- The Regulators
- Tit 4 Tat
- E.F.Jay

He also regularly composes the library/production music for radio and TV.

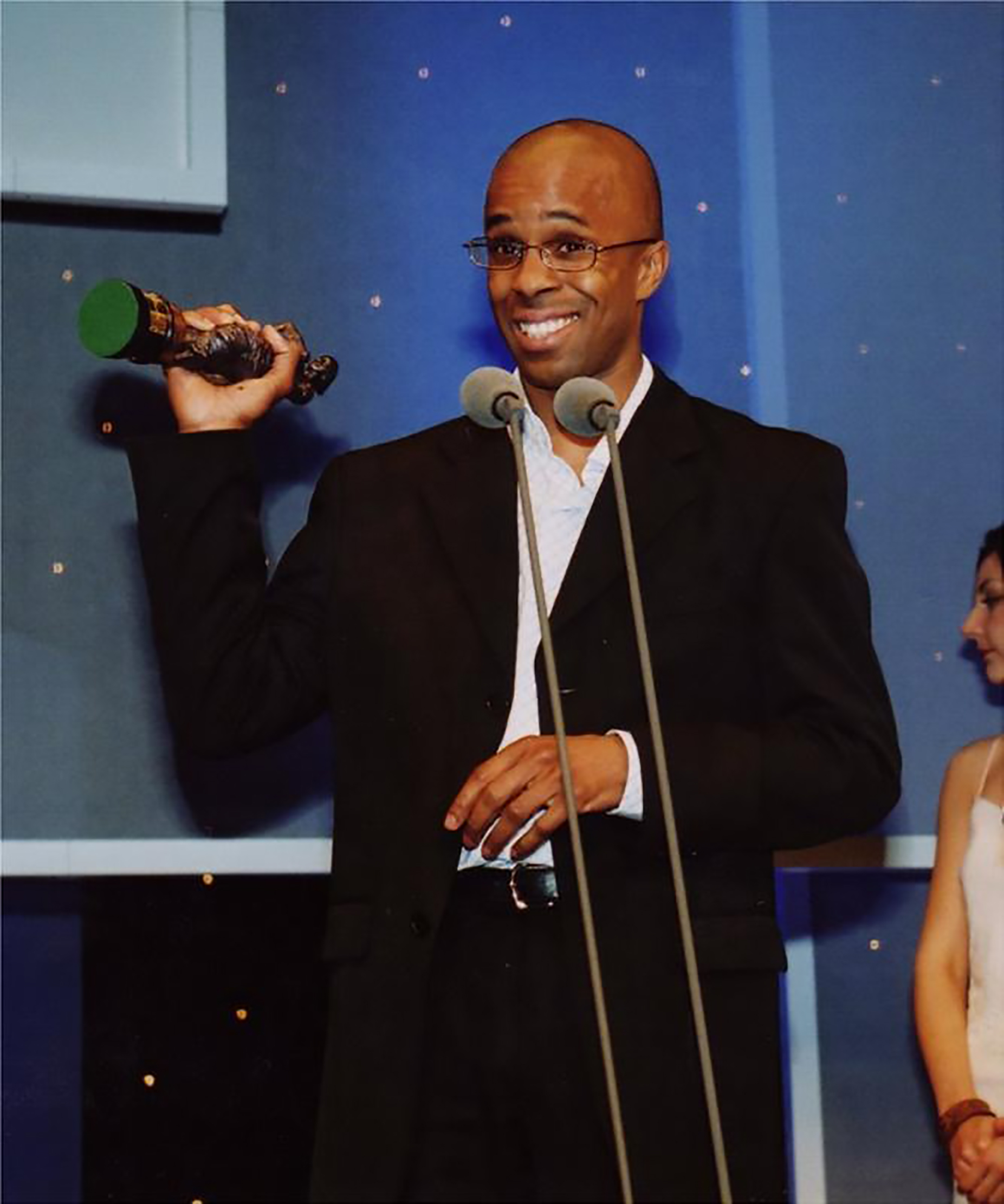
Dextrous at the Ivors Novello Awards 2003

== Awards ==
He provided the music for the documentary Feltham Sings, which won the BAFTA Award and an Ivor Novello Award for "Best Original Music for TV" in 2003. He was also nominated for a Royal Television Society award for "Best Original Music for TV" in the same year.

== Discography ==
Studio albums

- The Ultimate Vibes EP (1995)

Collaborative albums

- Jungle Love / She Wants a 24-7 (with Hyper Man) (1994)
- Legend / Sunny Smiles...(People) (with DJ Matt & Dr. P) (1995)
- Dexterity (with Bad Boy Brass) (1995)
