= Flybuys =

Flybuys may refer to:

- Flybuys (Australia), Australian loyalty program
- Flybuys (New Zealand), New Zealand loyalty program

== See also ==
- Flyby (disambiguation)
