= Money Love =

1992 single by Neneh Cherry

Single by Neneh Cherry

from the album Homebrew
- B-side: "Twisted"
- Released: 21 September 1992
- Length: 3:45
- Label: Circa; Virgin
- Songwriters: Neneh Cherry; Jon Sharp; Cameron McVey
- Producers: Neneh Cherry; Jonny Dollar; Cameron "Booga Bear" McVey

Neneh Cherry singles chronology
"I've Got You Under My Skin" (1990)	"Money Love" (1992)	"Buddy X" (1993)

Music video
- "Money Love" on YouTube

"Money Love" is a song performed by Swedish singer-songwriter and rapper Neneh Cherry, released in September 1992 by Circa and Virgin Records as the first single from her second album, Homebrew (1992). The song, both co-written and co-produced by Cherry, received favorable reviews from music critics, peaking at number 17 in Cherry's native Sweden. It also peaked at number six in Greece, number 22 in the Netherlands, number 23 in the UK and number 31 in New Zealand. The picture on the cover of the single is taken by French fashion photographer and music video director Jean-Baptiste Mondino.

== Critical reception ==
Alex Henderson from AllMusic viewed "Money Love" as a song that "decries the evils of materialism". Larry Flick from Billboard magazine described it as a "smokin', rock-flavored hip-hopper, empowered with a more biting, worldly edge than on past efforts." He remarked "periodic rushes of metallic guitars [that] slice through a fat groove, and underscore Cherry's well-seasoned singing and rapping." David Browne from Entertainment Weekly constated that on such "brazen tracks", the singer "still knows how to throw down with the best of them." Dave Sholin from the Gavin Report commented, "Grappling with the age-old dilemma of money vs. love is made all the more compelling set to a funky, rockin' beat." Connie Johnson from Los Angeles Times felt that Cherry "still hits like a bomb", with "songs that really seem to say something about how this young Afro-Swedish singer-songwriter is living."

Ian Gittins from Melody Maker wrote that "Money Love" was "clear-eyed and sparkling as ever, yet lacked Neneh's usual razor-sharp wit and banter". A reviewer from Music & Media stated that the singer's position "at the top of innovative pop is reaffirmed. A guitar riff on a dance record, hey that's uncommon! Rockers here's your chance to steal a sample back, instead of the other way round." James Hamilton from Music Week's RM Dance Update called it a "jerkily surging pop chugger". NME named it Single of the Week", complimenting it as "confident, assertive, and magnificently catchy." Charles Aaron from Spin praised the track as "flawlessly textured, heart-on-its-sleeve funk that totally levels the 'Black Cat' guitar riff. Cherry cajoles, wails, and raps the hard sell, trying to convince herself (as much as us) that love (a.k.a. music?) is still liberating."

== Track listing ==
1. "Money Love" (3:45)
2. "Twisted" (4:52)

== Legacy ==
Princess used a sample from "Money Love" in her 2008 song "Money".

== Charts ==
=== Weekly charts ===
Chart (1992)	Peak position
Australia (ARIA)	85
Canada Top Singles (RPM)	79
Europe (European Dance Radio)	16
Greece (Pop + Rock)	6
Netherlands (Dutch Top 40)	22
Netherlands (Single Top 100)	27
New Zealand (Recorded Music NZ)	31
Sweden (Sverigetopplistan)	17
UK Singles (Official Charts)	23
UK Airplay (Music Week)	21
UK Dance (Music Week)	29

=== Year-end charts ===
Chart (1992)	Position
Sweden (Topplistan)	99

== Release history ==
Region	Date	Format(s)	Label(s)	Ref.
United Kingdom	21 September 1992	7-inch vinyl; 12-inch vinyl; CD; cassette	Circa	
Australia	19 October 1992	CD; cassette	Circa	
Japan	28 October 1992	Mini-CD	Circa; Virgin	
