= Incentive Records =

English record label

Incentive Records, Ltd.
- Industry: Record label
- Genre: Dance, electronic
- Founded: 1999
- Founder: Nick Halkes
- Headquarters: United Kingdom
- Website: http://www.incentivemusic.com/

Incentive Records is an independent dance based company with records, publishing and producer management interests. It was launched in 1999 with investment from Ministry of Sound and a private investor, and run by XL Recordings/Positiva founder Nick Halkes. Releases by the label include "Liberation" by Matt Darey, "Communication" by Mario Piu, "Angel" by Ralph Fridge, "Boom Selection" by Genius Cru, "Whoomp!...There It Is" by BM Dubs and "Runaway" by Distant Soundz.

== Artists ==
- BM Dubs
- Chocolate Puma
- Distant Soundz
- Genius Cru
- Mario Più
- Matt Darey
- Tru Faith & Dub Conspiracy

== See also ==
- List of record labels
- List of electronic music record labels
