= List of UK Independent Singles Chart number ones of 1998 =

These are The Official UK Charts Company UK Official Indie Chart number one hits of 1998.

Issue date	Song	Artist	Record label
3 January	"5,6,7,8"	Steps	Jive
10 January	"Avenging Angels"	Space	Gut
17 January	"Avenging Angels"	Space	Gut
24 January ^{[a]}	"All Around the World"	Oasis	Creation
31 January	"All Around the World"	Oasis	Creation
7 February	"Crazy Little Party Girl"	Aaron Carter	Jive
14 February	"All I Have to Give"	Backstreet Boys	Jive
21 February	"All I Have to Give"	Backstreet Boys	Jive
28 February ^{[a]}	"Brimful of Asha"	Cornershop	Wiiija
7 March	"Brimful of Asha"	Cornershop	Wiiija
14 March	"Brimful of Asha"	Cornershop	Wiiija
21 March ^{[a]}	"It's Like That	Run-D.M.C. vs. Jason Nevins	Profile
28 March ^{[a]}	"It's Like That	Run-D.M.C. vs. Jason Nevins	Profile
4 April ^{[a]}	"It's Like That	Run-D.M.C. vs. Jason Nevins	Profile
11 April ^{[a]}	"It's Like That	Run-D.M.C. vs. Jason Nevins	Profile
18 April ^{[a]}	"It's Like That	Run-D.M.C. vs. Jason Nevins	Profile
25 April ^{[a]}	"It's Like That	Run-D.M.C. vs. Jason Nevins	Profile
2 May ^{[a]}	"Feel It"	The Tamperer featuring Maya	Pepper
9 May	"Feel It"	The Tamperer featuring Maya	Pepper
16 May	"Feel It"	The Tamperer featuring Maya	Pepper
23 May	"Feel It"	The Tamperer featuring Maya	Pepper
30 May	"Feel It"	The Tamperer featuring Maya	Pepper
6 June	"Feel It"	The Tamperer featuring Maya	Pepper
13 June	"Feel It"	The Tamperer featuring Maya	Pepper
20 June	"The Rockafeller Skank"	Fatboy Slim	Skint
27 June	"The Rockafeller Skank"	Fatboy Slim	Skint
4 July	"The Rockafeller Skank"	Fatboy Slim	Skint
11 July	"The Rockafeller Skank"	Fatboy Slim	Skint
18 July	"Be Careful"	Sparkle featuring R. Kelly	Jive
25 July	"Café del Mar 98"	Energy 52	Hooj Choonz
1 August	"Teardrops"	Lovestation	Fresh
8 August	"Teardrops"	Lovestation	Fresh
15 August	"El Nino"	Agnelli & Nelson	Xtravaganza
22 August	"Teardrops"	Lovestation	Fresh
29 August	"Teardrops"	Lovestation	Fresh
5 September	"One for Sorrow"	Steps	Jive
12 September	"Crush"	Jennifer Paige	Edel
19 September	"Sex on the Beach"	T-Spoon	Control
26 September	"Sex on the Beach"	T-Spoon	Control
3 October	"Sex on the Beach"	T-Spoon	Control
10 October	"Sex on the Beach"	T-Spoon	Control
17 October	"Gangster Trippin'"	Fatboy Slim	Skint
24 October	"Gangster Trippin'"	Fatboy Slim	Skint
31 October	"Gangster Trippin'"	Fatboy Slim	Skint
7 November	"Would You...?"	Touch and Go	V2
14 November	"If You Buy This Record (Your Life Will Be Better)"	The Tamperer featuring Maya	Pepper
21 November	"The Bartender and the Thief"	Stereophonics	V2
28 November	"Heartbeat / Tragedy"	Steps	Jive
5 December	"Heartbeat / Tragedy"	Steps	Jive
12 December	"Heartbeat / Tragedy"	Steps	Jive
19 December	"Heartbeat / Tragedy"	Steps	Jive
26 December	"Heartbeat / Tragedy"	Steps	Jive

== Notes ==
- ^{a} – The single was simultaneously number-one on the singles chart.

== See also ==
- 1998 in music
