= Disrespectful (mixtape) =

Mixtape by Bad Boy Chiller Crew
- Released: 18 February 2022
- Genre: Bassline
- Length: 52:31
- Label: House Anxiety; Relentless
- Producer: Tactics

Bad Boy Chiller Crew chronology
Full Wack No Brakes (2021)	Disrespectful (2022)	Influential (2023)

Singles from Disrespectful
- 1. "Don't You Worry About Me" Released: 18 February 2021; 2. "Footsteps on My Shoes" Released: 20 May 2021; 3. "Free" Released: 17 June 2021; 4. "Come with Me" Released: 25 June 2021; 5. "Bikes n Scoobys" Released: 23 September 2021; 6. "Messages" Released: 18 November 2021; 7. "BMW" Released: 19 January 2022

Disrespectful is the first mixtape by British bassline collective Bad Boy Chiller Crew, released on 18 February 2022 through House Anxiety and Relentless Records. It includes the singles "Don't You Worry About Me" and "BMW", which reached the top 40 and top 10 on the UK Singles Chart, respectively. The mixtape received acclaim from critics, reached number two on the UK Albums Chart and was certified silver by the British Phonographic Industry (BPI) in 2023.

== Critical reception ==
Professional ratings
Aggregate scores
Source	Rating
Metacritic	82/100
Review scores
Source	Rating
The Line of Best Fit	7/10
NME	4/5 stars
The Observer	4/5 stars
Pitchfork	8.0/10

Disrespectful received a score of 82 out of 100 on review aggregator Metacritic based on four critics' scores, indicating "universal acclaim". Pitchfork's Drew Millard summarised it as "full of soulful house samples and performance-art level idiocy" and a mixtape that "sounds like the rap equivalent of a cartoon tornado, which is what makes it hard to dismiss them as a novelty act". Hannah Broughton of The Line of Best Fit wrote that the mixtape "never seems to dip below floor filler level, and although it's unmistakably reminiscent of the '90s/00s hardcore and garage classics, it's the Bad Boy Chiller Crew persona that makes the record come into its own".

Reviewing the album for The Observer, Damien Morris felt that the singles and new tracks "add up to an excellent, if exhausting, mixtape. Sensibly, songs confine themselves to three minutes or less, and there's a wild joy to their commitment to entertainment". Sophie Williams of NME found the group to be "typically unfiltered and proudly, performatively rowdy" on the mixtape, which she opined "faces an impossible task of keeping up the pace over a 19-track hike. It's clear that the Crew aren't in danger of running out of ideas, yet could do with a little quality control".

== Track listing ==
Disrespectful track listing
No.	Title	Length
1.	"So Much in Love"	1:59
2.	"Footsteps on My Shoes" (featuring Jordan)	2:57
3.	"Skit 1"	0:09
4.	"BMW"	3:33
5.	"Don't You Worry About Me"	3:40
6.	"Bikes n Scoobys"	2:26
7.	"Get Out My Head"	3:52
8.	"One Time"	3:12
9.	"Skit 2"	0:13
10.	"Messages"	4:29
11.	"Take It" (featuring Local)	3:12
12.	"Always Be My Baby Boy" (featuring Becce J)	3:39
13.	"Somebody Else"	2:49
14.	"The Things You Do"	1:57
15.	"Skit 3"	0:06
16.	"Come with Me" (with Riton)	2:59
17.	"Free" (featuring Chris Nichols)	4:03
18.	"Wasting Time" (featuring Abi Flynn)	3:40
19.	"Stick Around"	3:26
20.	"Skit 4"	0:10
Total length:		52:31

== Charts ==
Chart performance for Disrespectful
Chart (2022)	Peak position
Scottish Albums (OCC)	1
UK Albums (OCC)	2
UK Dance Albums (OCC)	1

== Certifications ==
Certifications for Disrespectful
Region	Certification	Certified units/sales
United Kingdom (BPI)	Silver	60,000^{‡}
^{‡} Sales+streaming figures based on certification alone.
