= Club Asylum =

UK garage duo

- Also known as: The Asylum, Asylum
- Origin: England
- Genres: UK garage
- Years active: 1990s–present
- Members: Jeremy Sylvester
- Past members: Paul Emanuel

Club Asylum is the name of UK garage musician Jeremy Sylvester. They were originally a duo which consisted of Sylvester and Paul Emanuel. After the duo decided to go their separate ways, Sylvester continued to produce and remix under the Club Asylum moniker as a solo artist, and is still active to the present day.

== Biography ==
Sylvester and Emanuel first met during the early days of the UK garage scene at the London-based house and garage label Nice 'N' Ripe.

The duo scored their first chart entry in 1998 with "Freek Me Up", a bootleg vinyl release of the Jodeci song "Freek'n You", which reached No. 92 on the UK Singles Chart. This sparked interest from major labels such as Universal/EMI, Virgin, PolyGram and Strictly Rhythm. Their UK garage remixes of songs would prove popular in the scene, with official garage re-releases charting in the UK, including K-Ci & JoJo's "Tell Me It's Real" charting at No. 16 on the official singles chart and No. 4 on the UK Dance Singles Chart and Kristine Blond's "Love Shy" at No. 28 and No. 3 on the dance chart. Other popular remixes include "Imagine" and "Run to Me" by Shola Ama and "Sweeter Than Wine" by Dionne Rakeem. "Imagine" was a No. 1 dance hit in 2000 and was included in NME's "25 essential UK garage anthems" list. Capital Xtra included "Run to Me" in their list of "The Best Old-School Garage Anthems of All Time". "Sweeter Than Wine" reached No. 46 on the UK Singles Chart and No. 2 on the UK Dance Singles Chart in 2001.

Club Asylum have remixed notable songs including Another Level's "Freak Me", All Saints' "Bootie Call", Lutricia McNeal's "Someone Loves You Honey", Barbara Tucker's "Everybody Dance" (all from 1998) and Ginuwine's "What's So Different?" (1999).

Outside of Club Asylum, Jeremy Sylvester has produced, remixed and released material under many other aliases and as part of other groups/collaborations, including X-Factor 7 with DJ Disciple and Tuff Asylum with Karl 'Tuff Enuff' Brown.

In 2013, Sylvester appeared alongside many other garage pioneers in a documentary exploring the legacy of UK garage, Rewind 4Ever: The History of UK Garage.
