= Spend the Night (Danny J Lewis song) =

Single by Danny J Lewis
- Released: 1998
- Recorded: 1997
- Genre: UK garage, house
- Length: 7:03
- Label: Locked On
- Songwriter(s): Danny J Lewis
- Producer(s): Danny J Lewis

Danny J Lewis singles chronology
"Hi-Nites EP" (1996)	"Spend the Night" (1998)	"Unity ('98 Remixes)" (1998)

"Spend the Night" is a song by English house and garage producer Danny J Lewis. It was first released in 1997 on Stronghouse Records, then on Locked On the following year, peaking at No. 29 on the UK Singles Chart, and No. 1 on the UK Dance Singles Chart in June 1998. It samples the 1993 song "Secret Love" by Dannielle Gaha.

== Track listing ==
UK 12"
A1. "Spend the Night" (H-Man Mix) – 7:13
A2. "Spend the Night" (Serious Danger Mix) – 6:52
B1. "Spend the Night" (New Horizons Mix) – 6:19
B2. "Spend the Night" (Danny J Lewis Original Mix) – 7:03

UK CD single

1. "Spend the Night" (Top Cat Radio Edit) – 4:02
2. "Spend the Night" (Danny J Lewis Original Mix) – 7:03
3. "Spend the Night" (H-Man Mix) – 7:13
4. "Spend the Night" (Serious Danger Mix) – 6:52
5. "Spend the Night" (New Horizons Mix) – 6:19
6. "Spend the Night" (Santiago Blue Remix) – 8:21
