= Summer of Love (Lonyo song) =

2000 single by Lonyo

Single by Lonyo
- Released: 26 June 2000
- Genre: UK garage
- Length: 6:00
- Label: Riverhorse
- Songwriters: Lonyo Engele, Andy Di Martino, Paul Watson, Oscar D'León
- Producers: Paul 'Sweet P' Watson, Comme Ci Comme Ca, Gary 'Gee-Man' Bromham

Lonyo singles chronology
"Summer of Love" (2000)	"In Ayia Napa" (2000)

"Summer of Love" is a song by UK garage singer Lonyo. It was released as his debut single on 26 June 2000 and features MC Onyx Stone. The song samples the 1978 song "Cruel Desilusion" by Oscar D'León's group, La Critica. The single became a hit, reaching number eight in the United Kingdom, number 31 in the Netherlands and number 46 in Italy. In the United States, it peaked at number 39 on the Billboard Dance Club Songs chart in October 2000.

== Track listings ==
UK CD1

1. "Summer of Love" (radio edit)
2. "Summer of Love" (The No Bluffing Mix featuring MC Onyx Stone)
3. "Summer of Love" (Ci DIY dub)

UK CD2

1. "Summer of Love" (original extended)
2. "Summer of Love" (Robbie Rivera Boombastic vocal)
3. "Summer of Love" (Dreemhouse)

UK cassette single

1. "Summer of Love" (radio edit)
2. "Summer of Love" (The No Bluffing Mix featuring MC Onyx Stone)

European CD single

1. "Summer of Love" (radio edit)
2. "Summer of Love" (Robbie Rivera Bombastic vocal)

== Charts ==
=== Weekly charts ===
Chart (2000)	Peak position
Australia (ARIA)	98
Europe (Eurochart Hot 100)	38
Italy (FIMI)	46
Netherlands (Dutch Top 40)	31
Netherlands (Single Top 100)	52
Scotland Singles (OCC)	32
UK Singles (OCC)	8
US Dance Club Play (Billboard)	39

=== Year-end charts ===
Chart (2000)	Position
UK Singles (OCC)	166

== Certifications ==
Region	Certification	Certified units/sales
United Kingdom (BPI)	Silver	200,000^{‡}
^{‡} Sales+streaming figures based on certification alone.
