= The Energy (Feel the Vibe) =

1998 song by Astro Trax

Single by Astro Trax featuring Shola Phillips
- Released: 1998
- Recorded: 1997
- Genre: House, garage
- Songwriter(s): Evren Omer, Sonjay Prabhakar, Shola Phillips
- Producer(s): Evren Omer, Sonjay Prabhakar

"The Energy (Feel the Vibe)" is a song by Astro Trax released as a single in 1998. It features Shola Phillips, who had also collaborated with 187 Lockdown on their album 187.

The song reached No. 74 on the UK Singles Chart. In 2010, the song was sampled by Sepalcure for their song "Love Pressure".
