= Dedicated to Love =

Single by TJ Cases and Marissa
- Released: 2000
- Genre: UK garage
- Length: 5:57
- Label: WEA; Cut & Play Recordings; Inner Life
- Songwriter: TJ Cases
- Producer: TJ Cases

TJ Cases singles chronology
| "It's My Life" (2000) | "Dedicated to Love" (2000) | "If I Give You" (2000) |

Marissa singles chronology
| "Dedicated to Love" (2000) | "If I Give You" (2000) |

"Dedicated to Love" is a song by UK garage/house musician TJ Cases featuring Marissa on vocals. It was released as a single in 2000 on Cases' own label Cut & Play Recordings and then on major label Warner-Elektra-Atlantic (WEA). A chart-topping dance hit, the song reached number one on the UK Dance Singles Chart as well as number 85 on the UK Singles Chart in December 2000. Initial pressings were credited as TJ Cases presents Marissa, then later solely to Marissa, with Cases credited as songwriter and producer on all CD and 12-inch releases.

The song appears on the 2001 compilation album Garage Nation Summer 2001, mixed by Jason Kaye and Sticky and featuring MC Donae'o, released via INCredible.

== Track listing ==
UK CD maxi-single

1. "Dedicated to Love" (radio edit) – 3:43
2. "Dedicated to Love" (vocal dub) – 5:57
3. "Dedicated to Love" (moody dub) – 5:22
4. "Dedicated to Love" (Soulchild R&B edit) – 4:02

== Charts ==
| Chart (2000) | Peak position |
|---|---|
| UK Singles (OCC) | 85 |
| UK Dance Singles (Official Charts Company) | 1 |
