= Deeper (Serious Danger song) =

Single by Serious Danger
- Released: 1997
- Genre: Speed garage
- Label: Fresh Records
- Songwriter(s): Richard Philips
- Producer(s): Richard Philips

Serious Danger singles chronology
"Step Back" (1996)	"Deeper" (1997)	"High Noon" (1998)

"Deeper" is a song by English speed garage producer Serious Danger, released as a single in 1997. It reached the UK top 40, peaking at No. 40 on the UK Singles Chart, and also reached No. 1 on the UK Dance Singles Chart in December 1997. The song uses the hook and bassline of the 1991 song "Liquid Is Liquid" by Liquid.

== Track listing ==
UK 12"
A1. "Deeper" (Part One)
A2. "Deeper" (Wildcat Remix)
B1. "Deeper" (Part Two)
B2. "Love Is Forever" (ISB Re-Edit)

== Charts ==
Chart (1997)	Peak position
UK Singles (OCC)	40
UK Dance (Official Charts Company)	1
