= Don't You Worry About Me =

2021 single by Bad Boy Chiller Crew

Single by Bad Boy Chiller Crew

from the album Disrespectful
- Released: 18 February 2021
- Genre: Bassline
- Length: 3:40
- Label: Relentless
- Songwriters: Kane Welsh; Samuel Robinson; Gareth Kelly
- Producer: Tactics

Bad Boy Chiller Crew singles chronology
"Needed You" (2020)	"Don't You Worry About Me" (2021)	"Hideout" (2021)

Music video
- "Don't You Worry About Me" on YouTube

"Don't You Worry About Me" is a song by British bassline collective Bad Boy Chiller Crew. It was released on 18 February 2021, via Relentless Records, as the first single from the group's EP Charva Anthems. It was later featured on their mixtape Disrespectful in February 2022. The song reached number 31 in the United Kingdom, as well as number 89 in Ireland.

== Music video ==
The video for the song features the group riding around a field on an all-terrain vehicle performing stunts, in a hot tub joined by several women, and in their countryside retreat with a pool table and drinks.

== Charts ==
Chart performance for "Don't You Worry About Me"
Chart (2021)	Peak position
Ireland (IRMA)	89
UK Dance (OCC)	11
UK Singles (OCC)	31

== Certifications ==
Certifications for "Don't You Worry About Me"
Region	Certification	Certified units/sales
United Kingdom (BPI)	Silver	200,000^{‡}
^{‡} Sales+streaming figures based on certification alone.
