= Buddy X =

1993 single by Neneh Cherry

Single by Neneh Cherry

from the album Homebrew
- Released: 7 June 1993
- Genre: Hip-hop; soul
- Length: 2:49
- Label: Circa
- Songwriters: Cameron McVey; Paul Gorman; Jerry Barnes; Neneh Cherry
- Producers: Booga Bear; Jonny Dollar; Neneh Cherry

Neneh Cherry singles chronology
"Money Love" (1992)	"Buddy X" (1993)	"7 Seconds" (1994)

Music video
- "Buddy X" on YouTube

"Buddy X" is a song by Swedish musician Neneh Cherry, released in 1993 by Circa Records as the third and final single from her second album, Homebrew (1992). Co-written and co-produced by Cherry, it was a top-40 hit in both the Netherlands and the United Kingdom, peaking at numbers 23 and 35, respectively. The song also charted in the United States, reaching No. 43 on the Billboard Hot 100, and in Canada, where it reached No. 28 on the RPM Top Singles chart. Additionally, it peaked at No. 2 on the European Dance Radio Chart by Music & Media and No. 4 on the Billboard Hot Dance Club Play chart. The accompanying music video was directed by Jean-Baptiste Mondino.

== Critical reception ==
Larry Flick from Billboard magazine felt the song is "way-hip", adding that on this "hip-hop-derived romp", Cherry "further proves that her double talent for singing and rhyming comes in mighty handy, as she swerves from sassy street kid-to worldly chanteuse with ease." Dave Sholin from the Gavin Report said, "She speaks for all those who've been jacked around by that special someone in their life. Her message really cuts through, thanks to a catchy hook woven into not only the chorus, but the entire track." Chris Dafoe from Globe & Mail remarked that the song finds Cherry "tipping towards soul". In his weekly UK chart commentary, James Masterton opined, "The latest is unlikely to progress much further either, a far cry from the days of 'Buffalo Stance' and 'Manchild'."

A reviewer from Music & Media wrote that "intrinsically this is a slow song, but it has the drive of a real mean stomper. When Neneh sings "yeah yeah" you automatically join in and your feet start itching." Dave Piccioni from the Record Mirror Dance Update remarked that the singer "drops the home girl stuff just long enough for us to discover that there's been a good voice in there all along." Adam Higginbotham from Select viewed it as "a fine, simple song — Neneh's voice is laid over bubbling clarinet, scalding backing vocals, and simple R&B guitar lick." Siân Pattenden from Smash Hits gave "Buddy X" three out of five, adding that "this tune seems boring at first but is a "grower". It has a nice beat and some friendly backing sorts who croon "yeah yeah yeah"."

== Music video ==
A music video was produced to promote the single. It was directed by French fashion photographer and music video director Jean-Baptiste Mondino.

== 1999 remix ==
"Buddy X 99"

Single by Dreem Teem vs. Neneh Cherry
- Released: 25 October 1999
- Genre: UK garage
- Label: 4 Liberty
- Songwriters: Cameron McVey; Paul Gorman; Jerry Barnes; Neneh Cherry
- Producer: Dreem Teem

Dreem Teem singles chronology
"The Theme" (1997)	"Buddy X 99" (1999)	"It Ain't Enough" (2001)

Music video
- "Buddy X 99" on YouTube

In 1999, "Buddy X" was remixed by UK garage trio the Dreem Teem and retitled "Buddy X 99". This version was a top-twenty hit, peaking at No. 15 on the UK Singles Chart and No. 1 on the UK Dance Singles Chart. Other mixes on the single include the Original Dreem Teem edit, the Dreem Teem vocal mix and the Original Dreem Teem dub mix.

=== Track listing ===
- CD single
1. "Buddy X 99" (Dreem House edit) – 3:21
2. "Buddy X 99" (original Dreem Teem edit) – 3:33
3. "Buddy X 99" (Dreem Teem vocal mix) – 5:02
4. "Buddy X 99" (original Dreem Teem dub mix) – 5:32

== Charts ==
=== Original version ===
Weekly chart performance for "Buddy X"
Chart (1993)	Peak position
Australia (ARIA)	102
Canada Top Singles (RPM)	28
Dutch-language Region Airplay (M&M)	1
Europe (Eurochart Hot 100)	88
Europe (European Dance Radio)	2
Europe (European Hit Radio)	32
Netherlands (Dutch Top 40)	27
Netherlands (Single Top 100)	23
UK Singles (Official Charts)	35
UK Airplay (Music Week)	21
UK Dance (Music Week)	10
UK Club Chart (Music Week)	9
US Billboard Hot 100	43
US Dance Club Songs (Billboard)	4
US Dance Singles Sales (Billboard)	8
US Hot R&B/Hip-Hop Songs (Billboard)	96
US Pop Airplay (Billboard)	22
US Rhythmic Airplay (Billboard)	29
US Cash Box Top 100	38

=== 1999 remix ===
Chart (1999)	Peak position
Scottish Singles Sales (Official Charts)	42
UK Singles (Official Charts)	15
UK Dance (Official Charts)	1
UK Indie (Official Charts)	4

== Release history ==
Region	Version	Date	Format(s)	Label(s)	Ref.
United Kingdom	Original	7 June 1993	7-inch vinyl; 12-inch vinyl; CD; cassette	Circa	
Australia	Original	12 July 1993	CD; cassette	Circa	
Japan	Original	28 July 1993	Mini-CD	Circa; Virgin	
United Kingdom	"Buddy X 99"	25 October 1999	—N/a	4 Liberty	
