= Tru Faith & Dub Conspiracy =

UK garage supergroup

- Origin: England, United Kingdom
- Genres: UK garage
- Years active: 1999–2001
- Labels: Positiva, Public Demand

Tru Faith & Dub Conspiracy was a collaboration between two UK garage groups, Tru Faith (consisting of members George D, Maxim Elmalki & Nial Montgomery), and Dub Conspiracy (Andrew Hunter & Ian McKenzie). They are best known for their sole UK chart hit single, a cover of the Adina Howard song "Freak like Me", with British singer Imaani on vocals. Their version reached No. 12 on the UK Singles Chart in September 2000, and spent 5 weeks on the chart, as well as reaching number one on the UK Dance Singles Chart.

Tru Faith & Dub Conspiracy initially released a remix of Adina Howard's "Freak like Me" titled "Freek Me" on About 2 Records, backed with a remix of Beenie Man and Chevelle Franklyn's "Dancehall Queen". Both tracks were later officially released as cover versions on the Positiva and Incentive labels respectively, with vocals by Imaani on "Freak like Me" and by Shèna and Tittla on "Dynamite (Dancehall Queen)" (released under artist name Dinamyte). A set of remixes of "Dancehall Queen" by BM Dubs was also released.

== Discography ==
=== Singles ===
Title	Year	Peak chart positions	
Title	Year	UK	UK Dance
"Freak Like Me"	2000	12	1
