= Destiny (Dem 2 song) =

1997 garage song

Single by Dem 2
- Released: 12 December 1997 / 1998
- Recorded: 1997
- Genre: UK garage, 2-step garage
- Label: Locked On
- Songwriters: Dean Boylan, Spencer Edwards
- Producers: Dean Boylan, Spencer Edwards

Dem 2 singles chronology
"Da Bud Sessions Volume One" (1997)	"Destiny" (1997)	"Baby (You're So Sexy)" (1999)

"Destiny", also titled "Destiny (Sleepless)", is a song by UK garage duo Dem 2. It was released as a single in late 1997 and also in 1998 and reached No. 58 on the UK Singles Chart and No. 1 on the UK Dance Singles Chart.

== Impact and legacy ==
Alexis Petridis, writing for The Guardian in 2019, looking back at the genre after 20 years, listed "Destiny" at number 13 in his list of his 20 best UK garage tracks.

Simon Reynolds, writing in The Wire, called "Destiny" "the UK blueprint for two-step."

In 2017, Mixmag included "Destiny" in their list of the "12 best late-90s UK garage records", and in 2019 included the song in their list of "40 of the best UK garage tracks released from 1995 to 2005", saying "At a time where the garage house style started to evolve into a faster two-step sound, Dem 2 mastered the new style. 'Destiny' has an undeniable UK flavour, embalmed in fast, energetic pulses and choppy vocal cuts."

In December 2017 for Dummy Mag, UK duo Original Dodger, formerly known as Artful Dodger, included "Destiny" in their list of the "10 best UK garage tracks".

Redbull.com included the song in their list of "10 underground UK garage classics that still sound fresh today".

Capital Xtra included the song in their list of "The Best Old-School Garage Anthems of All Time".

Gemtracks included the song in their list of the "top UK garage songs between 1995–2005".

== Track listing ==
UK 12"
A1. "Destiny" (original mix) - 5:00
A2. "Destiny" (Dem 2 Junkie Luv Dub mix) - 6:16
B. "Destiny" (New Horizons remix) - 6:45

== Charts ==
Chart (1998)	Peak position
UK Singles (OCC)	58
UK Dance (OCC)	1
