= Distant Soundz =

British electronic dance musician

Distant Soundz is one of the pseudonyms of British electronic dance musician, Mark Christopher Shrimpton. Shrimpton has released various singles on vinyl and CD under the name.

== Notable singles ==
In early 2002, Distant Soundz recorded and released a garage cover of Cyndi Lauper's 1984 ballad, "Time After Time" with singer Robbie Beaumont, who made an appearance on Never Mind the Buzzcocks in the 'Identity Parade' round promoting the re-release of the single. The track received considerable airplay in the UK, and a video was made. Shrimpton performed the hit live on various TV appearances including Channel 4, BBC Wales, and on BBC One's Top of the Pops. The cover is also credited as one of the few UK garage records to be played on BBC Radio 2, with Steve Wright championing the single on his afternoon show. The track peaked at No. 20 on the UK Singles Chart in March 2002.

Following this was the DJ Sasha-supported Distant Soundz song "Runaway" that became a Capital 95.8 favourite. Various performances of the single were made at Capital Radio 'Party in the Parks' and Emap 'Feel the Noise' events. Released on Incentive / Ministry of Sound, the single has been featured on countless compilation albums, television programmes and an Xbox commercial.

Distant Soundz' next single, titled "Just Wanna Luv U", featured vocalist Damae from Fragma. Again receiving support across the Capital Network, the single gained airplay both in the UK and overseas. Released on the Inferno label, "Just Wanna Luv U" was also featured on various compilations. It peaked at No. 46 on the UK Independent Singles Chart.

The single "Stay (With the Sun Comin Up)" was first supported in the UK by BBC Radio One DJ, Judge Jules.

Distant Soundz teamed up with Rozalla on their latest single, "Lovefool", which was released in 2009 on Clubland Records.

2012 saw Distant Soundz release the UK garage single "Fairytales" featuring model Sydney Jo Jackson. The song received considerable support from UK specialist and pirate radio DJs including DJ EZ (Kiss 100). The official music video for "Fairytales" was playlisted on various Sky channels.
