= Aaron Soul =

British singer

- Born: Aaron Anyia
- Origin: England
- Genres: UK garage, R&B, dance
- Occupation: Singer
- Instrument: Vocals
- Years active: 2000–present
- Label: Def Soul

Aaron Soul is a British singer and songwriter.

He was signed to Def Jam's sublabel Def Soul and scored a top 20 hit in the UK with the UK garage track "Ring Ring Ring" which reached number 14 on the UK Singles Chart and number 15 on the UK Dance Singles Chart in 2001. The song was featured in the film Bridget Jones's Diary and was included on the film's soundtrack album.

He was part of the group 3000AD which included producers Tony Briscoe and Pete Devereux (of Artful Dodger).

Soul has continued to perform live on the club scene.

Apart from his solo music career, Soul has worked on tracks with Fatman Scoop, L Man, J Sweet, Lisa Maffia, MC DT, FooR and most recently, MNEK. Soul also runs his own clothing company, Soul Boutique as well as his own barbering business.

On 30 September 2022, Soul released "Ring Ring Ring (2022 Remix)", a new version of the original featuring Tradge.
