= Bad Boy Chiller Crew =

English bassline and garage collective

- Also known as: BBCC
- Origin: Bradford, West Yorkshire, UK
- Genres: Bassline, UK garage
- Years active: 2019–present
- Labels: House Anxiety, Relentless Greenback records
- Members: Sam "Clive" Robinson; Kane Welsh
- Past members: Kieran "Fraz" Durkin; Lewis "Molegrip" Lock; Gareth “GK” Kelly
- Website: www.bad-boy-chiller-crew.com

Bad Boy Chiller Crew (abbreviated as BBCC) are a Yorkshire rap collective from Bradford, UK. The group is composed of Kane Welsh and Sam "Clive" Robinson.

The group began by uploading comedy and prank videos on a Facebook page named "itzmefraz" as far back as 2017. The page was created by Kane and Kieran "Fraz" Durkin. In late 2018, they began to make music as Bad Boy Chiller Crew with early members Fraz, Lewis "Molegrip" Lock and Clive. Kane then became an MC with the group after being in the background, mostly recording videos prior. GK later joined as their DJ (eventually to also become an MC) and after internal feuds, Fraz and Molegrip were kicked out of the group in the first half of 2019. GK left the group in late 2025, citing a severe decade-long substance abuse as his reason.

In December 2019, The Guardian named them as one of their "50 new artists for 2020". In November 2021, the band appeared in their own six-episode, self-titled reality TV series, broadcast on ITV2. In early 2020, the group were signed by the London-based record label House Anxiety. Disrespectful was ranked 10th in The New York Times' "Best Albums of 2022" by Jon Caramanica.

== Discography ==
=== Studio albums and mixtapes ===
List of studio albums and mixtapes, with selected details, chart positions and certifications
Title	Details	Peak chart positions			Certifications
Title	Details	UK	UK Dance	SCO	Certifications
Git Up Mush	Released: 15 March 2020; Formats: CD, LP, digital download, streaming	—	—	—	
Full Wack No Brakes	Released: 25 September 2020; Label: House Anxiety; Formats: CD, LP, digital download, streaming	143	—	—	
Disrespectful	Released: 18 February 2022; Label: House Anxiety; Formats: CD, LP, digital download, streaming	2	1	1	BPI: Silver
Influential	Released: 10 November 2023; Label: House Anxiety; Formats: CD, LP, digital download, streaming	56	7	38	
"—" denotes a recording that did not chart or was not released in that territory.

=== Extended plays ===
- Charva Anthems (14 May 2021)
- Summer 24 (28 June 2024)

=== Singles ===
==== As lead artist ====
List of singles, with selected chart positions
Title	Year	Peak chart positions			Certifications	Album
Title	Year	UK	UK Dance	IRE	Certifications	Album
"450" (with S Dog)	2020	84	25	—	BPI: Platinum	Full Wack No Brakes
"Guns Up"	2020	—	—	—		Full Wack No Brakes
"Needed You"	2020	—	—	—		Non-album single
"Don't You Worry About Me"	2021	31	11	89	BPI: Gold	Charva Anthems and Disrespectful
"Hideout" (with Bru-C)	2021	—	—	—	BPI: Silver	Non-album single
"Footsteps on My Shoes" (featuring Jordan)	2021	—	34	—		Disrespectful
"Free" (featuring Chris Nichols)	2021	—	—	—		Disrespectful
"Bikes N Scoobys"	2021	—	—	—		Disrespectful
"Messages"	2021	—	—	—		Disrespectful
"BMW"	2022	7	1	29	BPI: Platinum	Disrespectful
"Skank All Night (You Wot, You Wot)" (with Majestic)	2022	—	—	—		Influential
"When It Rains, It Pours"	2022	69	26	—		Influential
"Renegade"	2022	—	—	—		Influential
"Jurgen Kropper" (featuring Local)	2022	—	—	—		Influential
"George Best" (featuring Tom Zanetti)	2023	—	—	—		Influential
"Spaceship"	2023	—	—	—		Influential
"Sliding" (featuring Window Kid and Charlie Choppa)	2023	—	—	—		Influential
"Memory"	2023	—	—	—		Influential
"Catch Me" (featuring MC Chippy and MC Cruzy T)	2024	—	—	—		Non-album single
"Take Me Away" (featuring Victoria Cull)	2024	—	—	—		Summer 24
"Divine"	2024	—	—	—		Non-album single
"Royalties & Loyalties"	2025	—	—	—		TBA
"Party Time"	2025	—	—	—		TBA
"Niki Lauda"	2025	—	—	—		TBA
"660" (featuring Dizzee Rascal and S Dog)	2025	—	—	—		TBA
"Dirty Diesel" (featuring Rags the Goat)	2026	—	—	—		TBA
"Jealousy Jealousy"	2026	—	—	—		TBA
"500 Ponies"	2026	—	—	—		TBA
"Mayday Mayday"	2026	—	—	—		TBA
"Bradford City"	2026	—	—	—		TBA
"Late At Night"	2026	—	—	—		TBA
"—" denotes a recording that did not chart or was not released in that territory.

==== As featured artist ====
Year	Title	Peak chart positions	Album
Year	Title	UK	Album
"Come with Me" (Riton featuring Bad Boy Chiller Crew)	2021	—	Disrespectful
"Alizé" (Gino Bonazzi featuring Bad Boy Chiller Crew)	2022	—	Non-album single
"Toxic" (Nines featuring Bad Boy Chiller Crew)	2023	37	Crop Circle 3 and Influential
