= Dionne Rakeem =

- Born: Dionne Rakeem
- Origin: Midlands, England
- Genres: UK garage
- Labels: Virgin Records

Dionne Rakeem is a female vocalist from the Midlands. Her song, "Sweeter than Wine", reached No. 46 on the UK Singles Chart and No. 2 on the UK Dance Singles Chart.

Her vocals also featured on the popular UK garage track "Hot Peppers Revenge" by Hot Pepper in 1999. In 2019, Artful Dodger included the song in his list of his "5 favourite forgotten gems from the glory days of 2-step and 4x4", saying: "Straight out of the '99 vault comes 'Hot Peppers Revenge'. Released on Hot Pepper's own Sow & Reap Records, this tune is a big favourite amongst many established UKG DJs as well as AD, including DJ Q and Scott Garcia. Although the life of Sow & Reap was short, the back catalogue is one for any astute UKG fanatic."
