= Sub.FM =

Programming
- Format: Music radio

Links
- Webcast: Sub.FM Player
- Website: sub.fm

Sub.FM is an Internet radio station, primarily operating from the United Kingdom, with DJs streaming bass music, such as dubstep, grime and garage. The station was founded in 2004 by DJ and producer Whistla, and is operated as a community-run radio station.
