= Ladies First (group) =

- Origin: England
- Genres: UK garage
- Years active: 2001–2002
- Labels: Polydor
- Past members: Mel; Sasha; Leanne

Ladies First were an English garage girl group active in the early 2000s. Their two singles, "Messin'" and "I Can't Wait", were both top 30 hits in the UK, as well as both reaching No. 5 on the UK Dance Singles Chart.

"I Can't Wait" is a UK garage cover of the 1986 Nu Shooz hit.

== Discography ==
=== Singles ===
- "Kiss the Sunshine" (2001), Polydor
- "Messin'" (2001), Polydor - UK #30
- "I Can't Wait" (2002), Polydor - UK #19
