= B-15 Project =

UK garage group

- Origin: England
- Genre: UK garage
- Years active: 1998–present
- Label: Relentless
- Members: Angus Campbell; Ian Wallman; Danny Wynn

B-15 Project are a UK garage group, originally consisting of members Angus Campbell and Ian Wallman. They are best known for the hit song "Girls Like Us" which peaked at number 7 on the UK Singles Chart in June 2000. DJ/producer Danny Wynn worked with the group from 2007.

== Discography ==
=== Singles ===
- "Party Time" (with Tony Curtis) (1998)
- "Feel My Desire" (1999)
- "All the Ladies" (featuring Tippa Irie & Lavine-D) (1999)
- "Testify" (vs. Colonel Red) (1999)
- "Strawberries"/"Soundboy" (1999)
- "Girls Like Us" (featuring Crissy D & Lady G) (2000) – UK #7
- "Feels So Good" (featuring Shola Ama & Ms. Dynamite) (2001) – UK #82
- "Everyone Falls in Love" (featuring Tanto Metro & Devonte) (2001)
- "Games" (featuring Machel Montano) (2002)
- "Put Em Up (Bassline Stomp)" (featuring Youngman) (2008)
- "Flick It Up" (featuring Hanna C) (2008)
- "Everybody Dance" (Danny Wynn vs. B-15 Project featuring Siobhan) (2008)
- "Feels So Good (Remix)" (featuring Shola Ama & Ms. Dynamite) (2009)
- "Diamonds and Pearls" (B-15 Project featuring McLaren) (2020)
