= Boom Selection =

2000 song by UK garage crew Genius Cru

Single by Genius Cru
- Released: 22 January 2001
- Recorded: 2000
- Genre: UK garage
- Length: 4:50
- Label: Kronik, Incentive
- Songwriters: Capone, Sean T, Trimmer, Fizzy, Keflon, Martin Fulterman, Michael Kamen
- Producer: Genius Cru

Genius Cru singles chronology
"Waiting" (1999)	"Boom Selection" (2001)	"Course Bruv" (2001)

"Boom Selection" is a song by UK garage crew Genius Cru. The single reached No. 12 on the UK Singles Chart and No. 1 on the UK Dance Singles Chart in January 2001. The song samples "Gravedigger" by the New York Rock & Roll Ensemble, to which Martin Fulterman and Michael Kamen are credited as songwriters.

Capital Xtra included the song in their list of "The Best Old-School Garage Anthems of All Time".

== Track listings ==
UK 12" single
A1. "Boom Selection" (original vocal mix) – 4:50
A2. "Bulletproof Dub" – 4:55
AA1. "Boom Selection" (Gridlock remix) – 7:11

UK CD single

1. "Boom Selection" (original vocal mix) – 4:50
2. "Bulletproof Dub" – 4:55
3. "Boom Selection" (Gridlock remix) – 7:11
4. "Boom Selection" video

== Charts ==
Chart (2001)	Peak position
UK Singles (Official Charts)	12
UK Dance (Official Charts)	1
