= 3rd Edge =

English boy band

- Origin: England
- Genres: R&B; UK garage; pop
- Years active: 2001–2003
- Labels: Parlophone
- Past members: Dan Grant; Julian Thompson; Thomas Jules-Stock

3rd Edge were an English boy band active in the early 2000s. Their two singles, "In and Out" and "Know You Wanna", were both top 20 hits in the UK.

Prior to joining 3rd Edge, Thomas Jules-Stock had released singles as a solo artist, with two charting in the UK; "That Kinda Guy" (1997) and "Didn't I Tell You True" (1998). After 3rd Edge, he became a songwriter and session singer and has worked with artists such as Wiley, Crookers, Simon Webbe, Professor Green and Rudimental and featured on 2Play's cover of "Careless Whisper", which was a No. 29 hit in 2004.

== Discography ==
=== Singles ===
- "In and Out" (2002), Parlophone - UK #15
- "Know You Wanna" (2002), Parlophone - UK #17

As featured artist

- "Who Are You?" - Sticky (2003), Social Circles
