= Teebone =

- Born: Ty Leon Thompson
- Origin: London, England
- Genres: Drum and bass, jungle, UK garage
- Occupations: Musician, record producer, DJ
- Years active: 1993–present
- Labels: Riddim Track Records, Vital Essence, Solid City Records, Stone Villager, Reinforced, East West

Teebone is a UK garage/drum and bass producer and DJ, best known for the 2000 hit "Fly Bi" which features the MCs Kie and Sparks.

In the 1990s, Teebone together with DJ Dextrous produced under a number of aliases including Fusion Forum and Regulators, releasing jungle and drum and bass records. In 1994, Teebone founded his label Riddim Track Records. In the late 1990s, he started producing UK garage; his biggest and most well-known track, "Fly Bi", reached No. 43 on the UK Singles Chart and No. 1 on the UK Dance Singles Chart. NME included the song in their "25 essential UK garage anthems" list.

Teebone also produces and directs music videos for other artists; among those are Shy FX and Pendulum ("Slam").
