= A vs B =

British musical group

- Origin: United Kingdom
- Genres: Dance, speed garage
- Label: Positiva Records
- Past members: Daniel Thornton; Geoff Taylor; Panos Liassi

A vs B were a British male production duo formed by Daniel Thornton and Geoff Taylor, who released the speed garage single "Ripped in 2 Minutes". It was released on the Positiva label, and entered the UK Singles Chart on 9 May 1998 at number 49; it remained on the chart for two weeks. The song samples Jomanda's "Make My Body Rock", Bug Kann & the Plastic Jam's "Made in Two Minutes" and Renegade's "Terrorist". Mixmag included the song in their list of "The 15 Best Speed Garage Records Released in '97 and '98".
