= Colour Girl =

British singer

- Origin: England
- Genres: UK garage, house
- Occupation: Singer
- Instrument: Vocals
- Years active: 1995–present
- Label: 4 Liberty Records

Rebecca Skingley, better known as Colour Girl, is a British singer.

She appeared on several house and garage records in the 1990s into the 2000s, and scored several hits on the UK Singles Chart, including a cover of "Can't Get Used to Losing You" and the UK garage anthem "Joyrider". Her debut album, Special, was released in 1999 on 4 Liberty Records.

The single "Joyrider" was first released in 1999 and reached a peak of No. 95, but a re-release the following year, retitled "Joyrider (You're Playing with Fire)", charted higher at No. 51. It also reached No. 2 on the UK Dance Singles Chart. 2001's "Mas que Nada" contains samples of the Sérgio Mendes version of "Mas que Nada".

In 2001, two tracks were released under the alias 'Blond'; "If I Was Your Girl" and a cover of Blondie's "Heart of Glass", both produced by Sovereign (Nigel Doyle). In the May 26, 2001 issue of Billboard magazine, it reads: "With 2-step slowly but surely making inroads into the U.S. (thanks to acts like MJ Cole and Artful Dodger), the timing may be just right for a wide-awake A&R exec to sign Colour Girl to a U.S. deal."

According to Colour Girl in an interview with The Face, her song "Things Are Never" (with Operator & Baffled) was the first UK garage track to be playlisted on Kiss.

== Discography ==
=== Albums ===
- Special (1999), 4 Liberty

=== Singles ===
As main artist

- 1996: "Special (I Want Your Love)"
- 1999: "Joyrider" – UK No. 95, UK Dance No. 2, UK Indie No. 31
- 2000: "Can't Get Used to Losing You" – UK No. 31, UK Dance No. 12, UK Indie No. 6
- 2000: "Joyrider (You're Playing with Fire)" – UK No. 51
- 2001: "Mas que Nada" (featuring PSG) – UK No. 57, UK Dance No. 10

As featured artist

- 1995: "Around in My Heart" (with P.S.I.)
- 1997: "I Believe in You" (with Baffled)
- 1998: "Things Are Never" (with Operator & Baffled) – UK No. 170
- 1998: "Tears" (with Underground Solution) – UK No. 77, UK Dance No. 2
