= Fly Bi =

Single by Teebone featuring MC Kie & MC Sparks
- Released: 2000
- Recorded: 1999
- Genre: UK garage
- Length: 5:15
- Label: Rhythm Records, EastWest
- Songwriter(s): Teebone, MC Kie, MC Sparks
- Producer(s): Teebone

"Fly Bi" is a song by British electronic music producer/DJ Teebone featuring MCs Kie and Sparks. It was initially released on Rhythm Records in 1999, then as an official single the following year on major label Warner's East West Records. The song reached No. 43 on the UK Singles Chart and No. 1 on the UK Dance Singles Chart.

In November 2016, UK duo Gorgon City compiled a list of their top UK garage songs for Billboard, with "Fly Bi" at #31.

In September 2019, NME included the song in their "25 essential UK garage anthems" list.

== Track listing ==
UK CD single

1. "Fly Bi" - 3:33
2. "Fly Bi" (Club Edit) - 5:15
3. "Fly Bi" (Remix Vox) - 5:07
4. "Fly Bi" (Acapella) - 4:16

== Charts ==
Chart (2000)	Peak position
UK Singles (OCC)	43
UK Dance (Official Charts Company)	1
