= Lonyo =

- Born: Lonyo Engele; 18 February 1974 (age 52); London, England
- Genres: UK garage, house, R&B
- Occupations: DJ, actor, singer
- Years active: 1998–present
- Label: Altra Moda Music
- Website: Lonyo on Twitter

Lonyo Engele (born 18 February 1974), known mononymously as Lonyo, is a British DJ, actor and singer.

== Early life ==
Lonyo grew up in London and attended Roehampton University.

== Career ==
Lonyo had a hit in 2000 with the single "Summer of Love", which reached number eight in the UK Singles Chart. The follow-up, "In Ayia Napa", was released in October of the same year, barely making it to the top 100 of the official UK singles chart. His third single "Garage Girls", released in April 2001, brought him back to the top 40, peaking at number 39. Prior to his solo singles, Lonyo was a member of Bon Garçon with producer Kevin McPherson and released the single "If You Need a Man" in 1998 which sampled Oliver Cheatham's "Get Down Saturday Night". They later released "Shake Shake" in 2003 and "Freek U" in 2005, the latter of which reached number 42 in the UK.

Lonyo has appeared on Never Mind the Buzzcocks in the identity parade round. In 2013, he won the Screen Nation Best Actor Award and starred in the TV miniseries The Bible as one of the Guardian Angels.

== Discography ==
=== Singles ===
Title	Year	Peak chart position			Certifications	Album
Title	Year	UK	AUS	NLD	Certifications	Album
"Summer of Love"	2000	8	98	31	BPI: Silver	Summer of Love
"In Ayia Napa"	2000	91	—	—		Summer of Love
"Garage Girls"	2001	39	—	—		Non-album single
"—" denotes releases that did not chart

== Filmography ==
=== Television ===
- 2013: The Bible (as Guardian Angel)
- 2012: New Tricks (as Fisk)
- 2012: Doctors (as Piers Louder)
- 2011: Never Mind the Buzzcocks (as himself)
- 2015: A.D. Kingdom and Empire (as Guardian Angel)

=== Film ===
- 2012: Virgo (as Virgo)
- 2011: David Is Dying (as David Brown)
- 2011: Notes (as Myers)
