= TJ Cases =

British songwriter and producer

- Also known as: Low Deep T
- Born: Anthony Ikenne Oyudo
- Origin: London
- Genres: House, garage
- Occupations: Songwriter, producer
- Labels: Cut & Play; Diverse
- Website: lowdeept.com

TJ Cases (Anthony Ikenne Oyudo), also known as Low Deep T, is a house and garage songwriter and producer based in London. He is best known for the UK garage songs "Do It Again", "You Bring Me Joy" (which both feature singer Kat Blu), "Don't Stop (Not Tonite)" and the No. 1 UK Dance hit "Dedicated to Love" featuring singer Marissa, as well as the 2012 song "Casablanca".

Low Deep T recorded his own version of "You Bring Me Joy" for his 2019 album Stronger Together.

== Discography ==
=== Albums ===
- Let's Reminisce (1999), Cut & Play Recordings
- Big Love (2011), Cut & Play Recordings
- We Are One (2012), Cut & Play Recordings
- Stronger Together (2019), Diverse Music

=== Singles ===
- "Do It Again" (featuring Kat Blu) (1998), Cut & Play Recordings
- "You Bring Me Joy" (featuring Kat Blu) (1999), Cut & Play Recordings
- "Don't Stop (Not Tonite)" (featuring Jakey) (1999), Cut & Play Recordings
- "It's My Life" (featuring Kat Blu) (2000), Cut & Play Recordings
- "Dedicated to Love" (with Marissa) (2000), Cut & Play Recordings/WEA - UK #85, UK Dance #1
- "If I Give You" (featuring Marissa) (2000), Cut & Play Recordings
- "Nothing Better Than Your Loving" (2008), Cut & Play Recordings
- "Fragile" (2009), Cut House Records
- "Now That I've Found You" (2011), Cut & Play Recordings
- "Casablanca" (2012), Cut & Play Recordings
- "Got 2 Find Love" (2014), Cut & Play Recordings
