= De Nada =

- Origin: England
- Genres: UK garage
- Years active: Early 2000s
- Label: Wildstar

De Nada were a UK garage act active in the early 2000s, fronted by singer Nadia, from Brixton, London. They were signed to Telstar's Wildstar Records, and their two singles, "Love You Anyway" and "Bring It on to My Love", both became top 30 hits in the UK, with the former also reaching No. 7 on the UK Dance Singles Chart.

== Discography ==
=== Singles ===
- "Love You Anyway" (2001), Wildstar – UK No. 15, UK Dance No. 7
- "Bring It on to My Love" (2002), Wildstar – UK No. 24
