= BM Dubs =

English garage producer

- Origin: London, England
- Genres: UK garage
- Labels: Incentive

BM Dubs (born Andrew Kirby) is an English garage DJ and producer.

== Biography ==
BM Dubs is best known for his 2001 hit version of "Whoomp! (There It Is)" which reached No. 32 on the UK Singles Chart and No. 4 on the UK Dance Singles Chart. It is based on the 2000 release "Whoops.... We'll Be in Trouble!" by Mr. Rumble who is credited on BM Dubs' version which also features Brasstooth and Kee and samples the Timo Maas remix of Azzido Da Bass's "Dooms Night". In July 2000, his white label release "Too Shady", which samples Eminem's "The Real Slim Shady" peaked at No. 49 on the UK Independent Singles Chart.

He has remixed tracks such as "Set You Free" by N-Trance, "Dynamite (Dancehall Queen)" by Dinamyte, and "Voodoo" by Warrior.
