= 2-step garage =

UK Garage subgenre

- Stylistic origins: UK garage; breakbeat; R&B; jungle; drum and bass; house
- Cultural origins: Mid-1990s, London, England
- Typical instruments: Sequencers; synthesizers; turntables; samplers; keyboards; drum machines; PC
- Derivative forms: Breakstep; grime; speed garage; dubstep

2-step garage, or simply 2-step, is a genre of electronic music and a subgenre of UK garage. One of the primary characteristics of the 2-step sound – the term being coined to describe "a general rubric for all kinds of jittery, irregular rhythms that don't conform to garage's traditional four-on-the-floor pulse" – is that the rhythm lacks the kick drum pattern found in many other styles of electronic music with a regular four-on-the-floor beat.

== Characteristics ==
A typical 2-step drum pattern features syncopated kick drums that skip a beat, with shuffled rhythm or triplets applied to other elements of the percussion, resulting in a sound noticeably distinct to those present in other house or techno music. Although rhythms with two kicks to a bar may be considered less energetic than the four on the floor pattern, 2-step rhythms maintain the listener's interest with off-beat snare placements and accents in the drumlines, scattered rimshots and woodblocks, syncopated basslines, and the percussive use of other instruments such as pads or strings.

Instrumentation usually includes keyboards, synthesizers, and drum machines. Other instruments are added to expand the musical palette, often in the form of acoustic recordings, which may be sampled. The primary synth basslines used in 2-step are similar to those in the style's progenitors such as UK garage, drum and bass, and jungle. Influences from funk and soul can also be heard. Vocals in 2-step garage are usually female (similar in style to those prevalent in house music and contemporary R&B), although male vocals in 2-step became just as prevalent. Some 2-step producers also process and cut up elements of a cappella vocals and use it as an element of the track. Much like other genres derived from UK garage, MCs are often featured, particularly in a live context, with a vocal style reminiscent of old school jungle.

== History ==
=== Early years ===
Horsepower Productions - Gorgon Sound (2000)
Excerpt from "Gorgon Sound" by Horsepower Productions, demonstrating a later, more experimental 2-step rhythm.
In this example, 2-step's usage of sub-bass can be clearly heard.

2-step rose to prominence as a genre on jungle and garage-based pirate radio stations in London as an evolution of, and perhaps reaction to developments in contemporary genres such as speed garage, with early 2-step shows often airing at "mellow moments in the weekend" such as Saturday morning or Sunday afternoon. DJs would mix UK garage productions with those of American house and US garage producers such as Masters at Work and Todd Edwards, pitching up the imports to around 130 BPM to aid beatmatching. DJs favoured the instrumental (or 'dub') versions of these tracks, because it was possible to play these versions faster without the vocal element of the track sounding odd. The sound of these pitched-up, imported records was quickly imitated by UK producers in their own music.

Pirate radio was central to the sound's early growth. Freek FM became the main outlet for London's emerging garage scene, and DJ EZ spent four years there hosting breakfast and weekend shows, developing the eclectic blend of garage subgenres that came to define the sound. Rinse FM, launched in 1994 by Slimzee and Geeneus as a jungle station, moved towards the emerging garage sound after struggling to compete with Kool FM's dominance in jungle. On the label side, Locked On Records was founded in 1996 by Peter Worthington, Tarik Nashnush and Ziad Nashnush out of their record shop, Pure Groove, in north London. Its roster included Zed Bias and Artful Dodger, and it later signed The Streets, whose debut single reached a wider audience via the 679 Recordings imprint.

=== Growing popularity ===
As the popularity of the sound spread, nights dedicated to it began to crop up, especially in London and Southampton. Label owner and dubstep musician Steve Goodman commented on the Hyperdub website on the debut of Forward>>, a highly influential nightclub in 2-step and later derivatives of the "UK hardcore continuum" – a phrase coined by Goodman to sum up the constant evolution in the hardcore/jungle/garage sound, and later adopted by other writers documenting the scene, such as Martin Clark. Arguably one of the earliest examples of a 2-step track is the Kelly G remix of the 1995 song "Never Gonna Let You Go" by Tina Moore. Upon its release as a single in the UK in 1997, it reached No. 7 on the UK Singles Chart. Other notable 2-step hits released in 1997 include "Destiny" by Dem 2, "My Desire (Dreem Teem Remix)" by Amira and "The Theme" by the Dreem Teem.

Artful Dodger feat. Craig David
- Re-Rewind (1999)
Excerpt from "Re-Rewind" by Artful Dodger featuring Craig David, a huge crossover hit which fused the 2-step rhythm with R&B vocals.
This excerpt also demonstrates the prevalent use of samples, such as glass breaking and a backspin in this example.

=== 1999–2001: Mainstream success ===
Between 1999 and 2001, 2-step reached the peak of the genre's commercial success. Some critics noted that party organizers favoured 2-step events over nights themed around jungle, drum and bass or other musical precursors because the 2-step nights invited a larger female attendance, and a less aggressive crowd. Much like drum and bass before it, 2-step started to garner crossover appeal, with a collaboration between 2-step producers Artful Dodger and R&B vocalist Craig David reaching No. 2 on the UK Singles Chart in late 1999 with the song "Re-Rewind". The groups Da Click (Pied Piper, MC Creed, PSG, Unknown MC and singer Valerie M) and DJ Pied Piper and the Masters of Ceremonies (of which Pied Piper and Unknown MC were also members) had hits with "Good Rhymes" (No. 14 in 1999) and "Do You Really Like It?" respectively, the latter a number-one hit in June 2001. Daniel Bedingfield's debut single "Gotta Get Thru This" was also a UK number-one in December 2001.

=== 2002: Decline of 2-step ===
After 2001, 2-step as a genre experienced a decline in popularity, but the more experimental releases in the genre from artists such as Horsepower Productions, Zed Bias, Wookie and Steve Gurley stripped away much of the R&B influence of the genre. This style took on a number of names including "dark 2-step", "new dark swing", and the more general term, "dark garage". This style became a major influence on later styles of UK garage influenced music, such as grime, as well as becoming a direct precursor to dubstep, which took the emphasis on bass and the instrumental nature of later 2-step compositions to their logical conclusion. In 2006, this latter, more experimental style experienced a resurgence in interest, due to the release of the Roots of Dubstep compilation on Tempa, and producers wishing to revisit the roots of the dubstep sound.

=== 2010s to present resurgence ===
Early 2011 saw the start of a gradual resurgence of 2-step garage. Producers such as Wookie, MJ Cole, Zed Bias and Mark Hill (formerly one half of Artful Dodger) made a return to the scene, by producing tracks with more of a 2-step feel. Electronic music duos Disclosure and AlunaGeorge, both successful throughout 2012 and 2013, often use elements of UK garage in their music.

Canadian singer The Weeknd's 2016 song "Rockin'" made use of 2-step sounds.

AJ Tracey's song "Ladbroke Grove" peaked at number three in October 2019 following its release as a single. It was certified platinum and was one of the best-selling songs of 2019.

Other 2-step hits in the 2010s include Toddla T's "Take It Back", All About She's "Higher (Free)", Naughty Boy's "La La La", Shift K3Y's "Touch", Chase & Status' "Blk & Blu", M.O's "Dance On My Own", Disclosure's "Omen" and Craig David's "When the Bassline Drops" and "One More Time".

The 2020s saw new releases such as "West Ten" by AJ Tracey and Mabel, "Don't Play" by Anne-Marie, KSI and Digital Farm Animals, "Just for Me", "Pain" (which interpolates Sweet Female Attitude's "Flowers") and "Where You Are" by PinkPantheress, "Grown Flex" by Chip and Bugzy Malone, "House & Garage" by Morrisson and Aitch, "Seven" by Jungkook and "Love Like This" by Zayn, all of which charted in the UK. Kurupt FM released their debut album The Greatest Hits (Part 1) which charted at No. 8 on the UK Albums Chart. The album includes appearances by Craig David (who features on lead single "Summertime"), Mist, Jaykae, D Double E, MC Creed, Big Narstie and General Levy.

== See also ==
- List of UK garage artists
- List of UK garage songs
