= Dreem Teem =

British music production trio

- Origin: London, England
- Genres: UK garage; house
- Occupations: Record producers; remixers; DJs
- Years active: 1996–present
- Labels: 4 Liberty; FFRR; VC
- Members: DJ Spoony; Mikee B; Timmi Magic

The Dreem Teem are a British DJ, music production and remixing trio consisting of DJ Spoony, Mikee B, and Timmi Magic. They formed in 1996 through pirate radio, and were instrumental in developing the UK garage sound. They presented radio shows on Kiss 100 (1997–2000) and BBC Radio 1 (2000–2003).

== Biography ==
The Dreem Teem were formed in 1996 after meeting on the London pirate radio station, London Underground FM. Mikee B had previously been part of the breakbeat hardcore trio Top Buzz. Through London Underground, they became key movers in the then developing UK garage genre, while also running their own record label, DJs for Life. In December 1997, they joined London's Kiss 100, and in January 2000 made the move to the national broadcaster BBC Radio 1. They would win a Music Broadcaster award at the 2001 Sony Radio Awards. Their Sunday show as a trio would eventually end in November 2003; however, DJ Spoony would stay on the station to present the weekend show solo until 2006, as well as on BBC Radio 5 Live, and Magic and Mikee B would continue to DJ and produce. They occasionally still DJ as a trio.

In 2013, the Dreem Teem appeared alongside many other garage pioneers in a documentary exploring the legacy of UK garage, Rewind 4Ever: The History of UK Garage.

== Discography ==
=== Mixes and compilations ===
- Dreem Teem – In Session Volumes 1/2/3 (1997), 4 Liberty
- INCredible Sound of the Dreem Teem (2000), INCredible

=== Singles and EPs ===
- "The Theme" (1997), 4 Liberty – UK No. 34
- "If I Was Your Lover" (1998), Deconstruction
- "Buddy X 99" (with Neneh Cherry) (1999), 4 Liberty – UK No. 15
- "It Ain't Enough" (with Artful Dodger) (2000), FFRR – UK No. 20

=== Selected remixes ===
- "My Desire" – Amira (1997), VC – UK No. 46
- "Tears" – Underground Solution featuring Colour Girl (1997), 4 Liberty
