= Genius Cru =

UK garage crew

- Origin: London, England
- Genres: UK garage
- Years active: 1999–present
- Labels: Incentive Records, Kronik Records
- Members: Capone; MC Fizzy; MC Keflon; Trimmer; Sean T

Genius Cru are a UK garage crew from London. They are best known for the song "Boom Selection" which reached No. 12 on the UK Singles Chart and No. 1 on the UK Dance Singles Chart in early 2001. Later the same year, they scored another top 40 hit with "Course Bruv".

== Discography ==
=== Singles ===
- "Waiting" (1999), Kronik
- Angel EP (2000), G Records
- "Boom Selection" (2000), Kronik/Incentive - UK #12
- "Course Bruv" (2001), Incentive - UK #39
- "Waiting 2013" (2013), Genius Beats
