= Danny J Lewis =

English house and garage producer

- Also known as: Enzyme Black, Hubert Hudson
- Origin: London, England
- Genres: House, UK garage
- Occupation(s): DJ, producer
- Years active: 1995–present
- Labels: Locked On, Defected, Imperial Recordings, Shindig, Stronghouse Records, MAW Records
- Website: dannyjlewis.bandcamp.com

Danny J Lewis is an English house and garage producer.

== Biography ==
He is best known for the 1998 hit "Spend the Night" which reached No. 29 on the UK Singles Chart and No. 1 on the UK Dance Singles Chart.

Lewis was inspired by the New York house sound and DJ/producers such as Masters at Work, David Morales and Frankie Knuckles. He has worked with other artists such as Ben Westbeech, Bugz in the Attic's Daz I Kue (Darren Benjamin), Mark Robertson (Spiritual South) and Mike City.
