= Dem 2 =

UK garage musician

- Origin: Thurrock, Essex, England
- Genres: UK garage
- Years active: 1994–present
- Labels: New York Soundclash Records, Locked On Records
- Members: Dean Boylan
- Past members: Spencer Edwards
- Website: www.dem-2.co.uk

Dem 2 is the name of UK garage musician Dean Boylan. They were originally a duo which consisted of Boylan and Spencer Edwards, who are from Thurrock in Essex. Since 2011, Boylan continued releasing material under the Dem 2 moniker as a solo artist.

The duo founded the record label New York Soundclash Records in 1994 and released the 12" vinyl "Reach". They are best known for the songs "Destiny", "Baby (You're So Sexy)" and Da Grunge Mix of "All I Know", released under the alias U.S. Alliance.

"Destiny" was a hit single in 1998, reaching No. 58 on the UK Singles Chart and No. 1 on the UK Dance Singles Chart. Alexis Petridis, writing for The Guardian in 2019, looking back at the genre after 20 years, listed "Destiny" at number 13 in his list of the 20 best UK garage tracks. Simon Reynolds, writing in The Wire, called "Destiny" "the UK blueprint for two-step."
