= M-Dubs =

UK garage production duo formed by Ras Kwame

- Origin: England, UK
- Genres: UK garage
- Years active: 1994–2000
- Labels: Baby Shack Records
- Past members: Ras Kwame; Dennis M-Dub

M-Dubs were a UK garage production duo formed by Ras Kwame. Their 2000 single, "Bump 'n' Grind (I Am Feeling Hot Tonight)" featuring Lady Saw, reached No. 59 on the UK Singles Chart.

== Discography ==
=== Singles ===
- "Over You" (1997)
- "I Got the Music (The UK Mixes)" (1997) (with The 49ers)
- "Destiny" (1998) (with Club Hi-Life featuring Ann-Marie Smith of the 49ers)
- "Over Here" (1998) (featuring The Emperor Richie Dan) - UK No. 84, UK Dance No. 9
- "For Real" (1999)
- "Bump 'n' Grind (I Am Feeling Hot Tonight)" (1999/2000) (featuring Lady Saw) - UK No. 59, UK Dance No. 8
