= Serious Danger =

English musician and record producer

Serious Danger (born Richard Philips) is an English speed garage musician and record producer. First becoming prominent in 1997, he was quite popular in the London area. Signed to Fresh Records, his best-known releases are "Deeper" (1997) and "High Noon" (1998). He also remixed "God Is a DJ" (1998) by Faithless. "Deeper" and "High Noon" both reached the UK Singles Chart, peaking at No. 40 and No. 54 respectively, with "Deeper" also reaching number one on the UK Dance Singles Chart.
