= Amira (British singer) =

Dance music singer

Amira Rasheed, or simply known as Amira, is a dance music singer best known for the song "My Desire" which charted three times on the UK Singles Chart, with its highest position at No. 20 in 2001. It also reached No. 1 on the UK Dance Singles Chart for one week in its first release in December 1997, and was also the first number one Dance hit of 1998 after it climbed back to the top of the chart three weeks later in the week ending 3 January 1998. The song was produced by house music group Blaze, and each release contains numerous mixes of the song, with a popular UK garage mix by the Dreem Teem. Capital Xtra included this version in their list of "The Best Old-School Garage Anthems of All Time".

== Discography ==
=== Singles ===
- "Walk" (1996), Slip 'n' Slide - UK #97, UK Dance #8
- "Getaway" (1996), Easy Street Records
- "What Is Love" (with Cassio & the Funky People), Easy Street Records (1997)
- "My Desire" (1997), VC Recordings/Virgin/Slip 'n' Slide - UK #51, UK Dance #1
- "My Desire" (1998) - UK #46, UK Dance #5
- "My Desire" (2001) - UK #20, UK Dance #6
- "Why Is It Wrong to Love You" (2000), VC Recordings/Slip 'n' Slide
- "I Think of You" (with Blaze) (2003), Slip 'n' Slide - UK Dance #28
