= Shara Nelson discography =

- Studio albums: 3
- Extended plays: 1
- Compilation albums: 2
- Singles: 19
- Music videos: 3+

The British singer and songwriter Shara Nelson made three studio albums and 19 singles between 1983 and 2008, in addition to compilations, videos, EPs and other works.

== Studio albums ==
Year	Album details	Peak chart positions										Sales	Certifications (sales thresholds)
Year	Album details	AU	AT	FR	NL	NO	NZ	SE	CH	UK	U.S.	Sales	Certifications (sales thresholds)
1991	Blue Lines with Massive Attack: Release date: June 1; Record label: Virgin (#91685); Formats: LP, CD, CS	69	5	31	39	29	26	14	26	13	—	UK: 600,000; FR: 100,000	UK: 2xPlatinum; FR: 2xGold
1993	What Silence Knows: Release date: 1993; Record label: Cooltempo; Formats: LP, CD	131	32	—	—	—	—	—	—	22	—	UK: 100,000	UK: Gold
1995	Friendly Fire: Release date: 1995; Record label: Cooltempo; Formats: LP, CD	222	—	—	—	—	—	—	—	44	—		
"—" denotes releases that did not chart.

=== Compilations ===
Year	Album details	Peak chart positions											Sales	Certifications
Year	Album details	AU	AT	BE	FI	IT	NO	NZ	PT	CH	UK	US	Sales	Certifications
1998	Singles 90/98 with Massive Attack: Release date: December 7; Record label: Virgin/Circa; Format: 11xCD box	—	—	—	—	—	—	—	—	—	—	—		
2006	Collected with Massive Attack: Release date: March 27; Record label: Virgin; Format: CD/DVD DualDisc	19	13	1	8	6	8	3	2	4	2	198	UK: 300,000; BE: 10,000; FR: 100,000; SWI: 15,000	UK: Platinum; BE: Gold; FR: Gold; SWI: Gold; EU: Platinum
"—" denotes releases that did not chart.

== Extended plays ==
Year	EP Details	Notes
1996	Good Intentions with G/Corp: Release date: Record label: Medicine Records; Format: 12", CD	Four track EP released in collaboration with Groove Corporation (aka G/Corp), featuring "Good Intentions (Edit)", "Good Intentions (Extended Mix)", "Faraway Places" and "Return of the Skunk Unlimited Orchestra"

== Singles ==
Year	Single	Peak chart positions												Album
Year	Single	AU	AT	DE	NL	NZ	SE	CH	UK	USA				Album
Year	Single	AU	AT	DE	NL	NZ	SE	CH	UK	AS	DCP	DSS	100	Album
1983	"Aiming at Your Heart" with The Circuit	—	—	—	—	—	—	—	—	—	—	—	—	
1986	"Can't Get Over You"	—	—	—	—	—	—	—	—	—	—	—	—	
1990	"Daydreaming" with Massive Attack	—	—	—	—	—	—	—	81	—	—	—	—	Blue Lines
1991	"Unfinished Sympathy" with Massive Attack	95	—	17	2	48	40	9	13	—	—	—	—	Blue Lines
1991	"Safe from Harm" with Massive Attack	132	23	33	28	—	—	15	25	28	35	32	—	Blue Lines
1993	"Down That Road"	102	—	68	—	—	—	—	19	—	16	—	109	What Silence Knows
1993	"One Goodbye in Ten"	200	30	71	49	—	—	—	21	—	—	—	—	What Silence Knows
1994	"Uptight"	217	—	—	—	—	—	—	19	—	—	—	—	What Silence Knows
1994	"Nobody"	259	—	—	—	—	—	—	49	—	—	—	—	What Silence Knows
1994	"Inside Out"	—	—	—	—	—	—	—	34	—	—	—	—	What Silence Knows
1995	"Rough with the Smooth"	223	—	—	—	—	—	—	30	—	—	—	—	Friendly Fire
1996	"I Fell (So You Could Catch Me)"	—	—	—	—	—	—	—	76	—	—	—	—	Friendly Fire
1998	"Sense of Danger" with Presence	—	—	—	—	—	—	—	61	—	10	—	—	All Systems Gone
1999	"Black Island" with Cuba	—	—	—	—	—	—	—	—	—	—	—	—	Leap of Faith
1999	"U" with Kasha	—	—	—	—	—	—	—	—	—	—	—	—	
2003	"Hari Up Hari" with Adrian Sherwood	—	—	—	—	—	—	—	—	—	—	—	—	Never Trust a Hippy
2003	"Right Now" with Futurasound	—	—	—	—	—	—	—	—	—	—	—	—	
2004	"Nobody Else"	—	—	—	—	—	—	—	—	—	—	—	—	
2008	"Go That Deep" with NUfrequency	—	—	—	—	—	—	—	—	—	—	—	—	
"—" denotes a single that did not chart or was not released in that region.

=== Other appearances ===
Year	Song	Notes
1984	"In Another World" with Voice of Authority	Appears on Very Big in America Right Now by Voice of Authority
1984	"Savanna Prance" with The Missing Brazilians	Appears on Warzone by The Missing Brazilians
1988	"The Look of Love" with The Wild Bunch	Appears on Friends & Countrymen by The Wild Bunch
1991	"Lately" with Massive Attack	Appears on Blue Lines
1994	"On the Shore" with Saint Etienne	Appears on Tiger Bay by Saint Etienne
1995	"Insert B (The Real Deal)/Nobody Knows" with Guru	Appears on Guru's Jazzmatazz, Volume II: The New Reality
1996	"Faraway Places" with Groove Corporation	Appears on EP Good Intentions
1997	"Moonraker" with David Arnold	Appears on Shaken and Stirred: The David Arnold James Bond Project
1999	"Matter of Fact" with Presence	Appears on All Systems Gone by Presence
2002	"Realise"	Appears on VA compilation 4 Vini: Forever Young LP
2004	"Say My Name" with Little Axe	Appears on Champagne & Grits by Little Axe
2007	"If"	Released only as digital single
2007	"Push Me Away (Strings of Life)" with 10th Planet	Appears on VA compilation Mastercuts Life..Style: Summer House]
2008	"I Wanna Know" with Doug Wimbish	Appears on CinemaSonics by Doug Wimbish

== Videos ==
=== Music videos ===
Year	Title	Director
1990	"Daydreaming" with Massive Attack	Baillie Walsh
1991	"Unfinished Sympathy" with Massive Attack	Baillie Walsh
1991	"Safe from Harm" with Massive Attack	Baillie Walsh

== See also ==
- Massive Attack discography
