= List of trip hop artists =

This is a list of trip hop artists, a genre that originated in Bristol, England.

== 0–9 ==
- 12 Rounds
- 8mm
- 9 Lazy 9

== A ==
- Aim
- Air
- Dot Allison
- Alpha
- Archive
- Attica Blues

== B ==
- Howie B
- Baby Fox
- The Baby Namboos
- Banks
- Beast
- Bitter:Sweet
- Björk
- Blue Foundation
- Blue States
- Bomb the Bass
- Bonobo
- Bowery Electric
- Bows
- Bran Van 3000

== C ==
- Céu
- Neneh Cherry
- Chinese Man
- Cibo Matto
- CirKus
- Coldcut
- Creep

== D ==
- Lana Del Rey
- Delilah
- Depth Charge
- Dido
- The Dining Rooms
- DJ Cam
- DJ Food
- DJ Krush
- DJ Shadow
- DJ Spooky
- DJ Vadim

== E ==
- Earthling
- Earthphish
- Elsiane
- Emancipator
- Esthero
- Everything but the Girl

== F ==
- Faithless
- Fink
- FKA twigs
- Fluke
- Flunk
- Funki Porcini

== G ==
- Glass Animals
- Goldfrapp
- Gorillaz
- Groove Armada

== H ==
- Zeid Hamdan
- The Herbaliser
- Hooverphonic
- How to Destroy Angels
- Hungry Lucy
- Hypnogaja
- Haelos

== I ==
- Ilya
- The Internet

== J ==
- Jay-Jay Johanson
- Juryman

== K ==
- Kid Loco
- Kosheen
- Kruder & Dorfmeister

== L ==
- Lamb
- Tim "Love" Lee
- Little Dragon
- London Grammar
- Lovage
- Lunascape

== M ==
- Madonna
- Martina Topley-Bird
- Mandalay
- Massive Attack
- Metaphra
- Moko
- Moloko
- Monk & Canatella
- Mono
- Morcheeba
- Mr. Scruff

== N ==
- Nicolette
- Nightmares on Wax
- Noonday Underground

== O ==
- Olive
- Beth Orton

== P ==
- Poliça
- Portishead
- Pretty Lights

== R ==
- Rae & Christian
- Recloose
- Red Snapper
- LiLi Roquelin

== S ==
- Danny Saber
- Shantel
- Sia
- Skylab
- Smith & Mighty
- Smoke City
- Sneaker Pimps
- Soap Kills
- Sofa Surfers
- Space
- Mark Stewart
- Supreme Beings of Leisure

== T ==
- Team Sleep
- Terranova
- Thievery Corporation
- Tracey Thorn
- Tosca
- Tranquility Bass
- Tricky

== U ==
- Unkle

== W ==
- Wagon Christ
- Wax Poetic
- Wax Tailor
- Charles Webster
- The Wiseguys

== Y ==
- Yasmin

== Z ==
- Zero 7
