= List of UK R&B Albums Chart number ones of 1998 =

The logo of the Official Charts Company, responsible for compiling all of the official music charts in the United Kingdom, including the R&B albums chart.

The UK R&B Chart is a weekly chart, first introduced in October 1994, that ranks the 40 biggest-selling singles and albums that are classified in the R&B genre in the United Kingdom. The chart is compiled by the Official Charts Company, and is based on sales of CDs, downloads, vinyl and other formats over the previous seven days.

The following are the number-one albums of 1998.

== Number-one albums ==
Issue date	Album	Artist(s)	Record label	Ref.
4 January	All Saints	All Saints	London/Island	
11 January	All Saints	All Saints	London/Island	
18 January	All Saints	All Saints	London/Island	
25 January	All Saints	All Saints	London/Island	
1 February	All Saints	All Saints	London/Island	
8 February	All Saints	All Saints	London/Island	
15 February	All Saints	All Saints	London/Island	
22 February	All Saints	All Saints	London/Island	
1 March	Kiss Smooth Grooves 98	Various Artists	Polygram TV	
8 March	Kiss Smooth Grooves 98	Various Artists	Polygram TV	
15 March	All Saints	All Saints	London/Island	
22 March	Postcards from Heaven	Lighthouse Family	Wildcard/Polydor	
29 March	Fresco	M People	M People	
5 April	Fresco	M People	M People	
12 April	Urban Rhymes	Various Artists	Global/Polygram TV	
19 April	Urban Rhymes	Various Artists	Global/Polygram TV	
25 April	The Best Hip Hop Anthemz... Ever!	Various Artists	Virgin/EMI	
3 May	All Saints	All Saints	London/Island	
10 May	All Saints	All Saints	London/Island	
17 May	Sketches for My Sweetheart the Drunk	Jeff Buckley	Columbia	
24 May	All Saints	All Saints	London/Island	
31 May	All Saints	All Saints	London/Island	
7 June	All Saints	All Saints	London/Island	
14 June	Never Say Never	Brandy	Atlantic	
21 June	Never Say Never	Brandy	Atlantic	
28 June	Embrya	Maxwell	Columbia	
5 July	Postcards from Heaven	Lighthouse Family	Wildcard/Polydor	
12 July	Postcards from Heaven	Lighthouse Family	Wildcard/Polydor	
19 July	Postcards from Heaven	Lighthouse Family	Wildcard/Polydor	
26 July	Postcards from Heaven	Lighthouse Family	Wildcard/Polydor	
2 August	Postcards from Heaven	Lighthouse Family	Wildcard/Polydor	
9 August	Postcards from Heaven	Lighthouse Family	Wildcard/Polydor	
16 August	Street Vibes	Various Artists	Warner Bros. Records/Global/Sony TV	
23 August	Street Vibes	Various Artists	Warner Bros. Records/Global/Sony TV	
30 August	Street Vibes	Various Artists	Warner Bros. Records/Global/Sony TV	
6 September	Street Vibes	Various Artists	Warner Bros. Records/Global/Sony TV	
13 September	All Saints	All Saints	London/Island	
20 September	All Saints	All Saints	London/Island	
27 September	Postcards from Heaven	Lighthouse Family	Wildcard/Polydor	
4 October	The Miseducation of Lauryn Hill	Lauryn Hill	Ruffhouse/Columbia	
11 October	The Miseducation of Lauryn Hill	Lauryn Hill	Ruffhouse/Columbia	
18 October	The Miseducation of Lauryn Hill	Lauryn Hill	Ruffhouse/Columbia	
25 October	The Miseducation of Lauryn Hill	Lauryn Hill	Ruffhouse/Columbia	
1 November	The Miseducation of Lauryn Hill	Lauryn Hill	Ruffhouse/Columbia	
8 November	Medicine 4 My Pain	Lynden David Hall	Cooltempo	
15 November	R.	R. Kelly	Jive	
22 November	#1's	Mariah Carey	Columbia	
29 November	#1's	Mariah Carey	Columbia	
6 December	#1's	Mariah Carey	Columbia	
13 December	#1's	Mariah Carey	Columbia	
20 December	#1's	Mariah Carey	Columbia	
27 December	#1's	Mariah Carey	Columbia	

== See also ==
- List of UK Albums Chart number ones of 1998
