= Friendly Fire (Shara Nelson album) =

Studio album by Shara Nelson
- Released: 25 September 1995
- Genre: British soul; downtempo; trip hop
- Length: 49:08
- Label: Cooltempo
- Producer: Michael Peden

Shara Nelson chronology
What Silence Knows (1993)	Friendly Fire (1995)

Singles from Friendly Fire
- 1. "Rough with the Smooth" Released: 1995; 2. "I Fell (So You Could Catch Me)" Released: 1996

Friendly Fire is the second album by the British singer/songwriter Shara Nelson. It was released in 1995 on Cooltempo Records.

The album contains Nelson's UK Top 30 hit, "Rough with the Smooth".

== Critical reception ==
Professional ratings
Review scores
Source	Rating
AllMusic	2/5 stars
Muzik	5/5 stars
NME	7/10

The Irish Times wrote that "Shara Nelson's voice in itself would seduce any listener but when accompanied by superior song writing and pristine production, the results are even more tantalising." The Independent noted that "anyone admiring of Portishead's sparse tripped-out soundscapes, but left thirsty by their lack of genuine soul or authenticity, will be quenched by these sumptuous songs, which make as much sense at three in the afternoon as three in the morning."

== Track listing ==
Lyrics by Shara Nelson

1. "Rough with the Smooth" (Nelson, Ashley Beedle, Marc Woodford)
2. "Moving On" (Nelson, Doug Wimbish, Skip McDonald)
3. "Poetry" (Nelson, Lucas Secon)
4. "I Fell (So You Could Catch Me)" (Nelson, David Arnold)
5. "Footprint" (Nelson, Dave Henley, Justin Langlands)
6. "Between the Lines" (Nelson, David Arnold)
7. "After You" (Nelson, Jah Wobble)
8. "Exit One" (Nelson, Lucas Secon)
9. "Friendly Fire" (Nelson, Doug Wimbish, Skip McDonald)
10. "Keeping Out the Cold/Segabeat" (Nelson, Bob Stanley, Pete Wiggs/Nelson)

== Personnel ==
- Shara Nelson – lead vocals
- The London Session Orchestra – strings
- Gavyn Wright – orchestra leader
- Martin Virgo – programming
- Nick Ingman – string arrangements
- Wil Malone – string arrangement on "Footprint"
- Jah Wobble – bass on "After You"
- DJ Crystl – scratches on "Friendly Fire"
- Steven Dante – backing vocals on "Rough with the Smooth"
- Lain Gray, Tee Green – backing vocals on "Moving On" and "Poetry"

== Charts ==
Chart (1995)	Peak position
Australian Albums Chart	222
UK Albums Chart	44
