= Nobody (Shara Nelson song) =

1994 single by Shara Nelson

Single by Shara Nelson

from the album What Silence Knows
- Released: 23 May 1994
- Genre: Neo soul
- Length: 4:22
- Label: Cooltempo
- Songwriters: Shara Nelson; Kenny Nicholas; Trevor Jacobs; Suni Suleynan
- Producer: Michael Peden

Shara Nelson singles chronology
| "Uptight" (1994) | "Nobody" (1994) | "Inside Out" / "Down That Road" (1994) |

Audio sample
- file; help

"Nobody" is a song by British singer-songwriter Shara Nelson, released in May 1994 as the fifth single from her first solo album, What Silence Knows (1993), through Cooltempo Records. The song was co-written by Nelson and produced by Michael Peden. It peaked at number 49 on the UK Singles Chart and number 16 on the Music Week Dance Singles chart. The accompanying music video was directed by Kevin Bray and filmed in the US.

== Critical reception ==
Pan-European magazine Music & Media wrote, "The singles taken from What Silence Knows are innumerable. But still with this neo soul track one doesn't have the idea of listening to a leftover, proving the depth of the album." James Hamilton from the Record Mirror Dance Update described it as a "gently shuffling superb soulful lament" in his weekly dance column. Nilou Panahpour from Rolling Stones remarked, "Her moody, sensuous soprano set against the thumping beats and ominous strings lends her words dramatic force." Adam Higginbotham from Select named it a "pounding Massive-a-like". Jonathan Bernstein from Spin felt a "forbidding tone is established" on the song, as the opening track of the album.

== Music video ==
The music video for "Nobody" was directed by American director Kevin Bray and produced by Liz Friedlander for DNA. It was released on 23 May 1994 and shot in Central Station in Los Angeles, the US, featuring black-and-white vignettes. Bray had previously directed the video for "Uptight".

== Track listings ==
- UK CD single
1. "Nobody" (Perfecto Scratch edit) – 4:47
2. "Nobody" (The Kenny Dope mix) – 4:31
3. "Nobody" (Delta House of Funk mix) – 7:31
4. "Nobody" (Perfecto 12-inch) – 6:15
5. "Nobody" (album mix) – 4:22
- European CD single
1. "Nobody" (Perfecto Scratch edit) – 4:47
2. "Nobody" (Perfecto 12-inch) – 6:15
3. "Nobody" (The Kenny Dope mix) – 4:31
4. "Nobody" (Delta House of Funk mix) – 7:31

== Charts ==
| Chart (1994) | Peak position |
|---|---|
| Australia (ARIA) | 259 |
| UK Singles (OCC) | 49 |
| UK Dance (Music Week) | 16 |
| UK Club Chart (Music Week) | 27 |

== Release history ==
| Region | Date | Format(s) | Label(s) | Ref. |
|---|---|---|---|---|
| United Kingdom | 23 May 1994 | 7-inch vinyl; 12-inch vinyl; CD; cassette | Cooltempo | |
| Australia | 18 July 1994 | CD; cassette | Cooltempo | |
