= I Fell (So You Could Catch Me) =

Single by Shara Nelson

from the album Friendly Fire
- Released: 25 March 1996
- Label: Cooltempo
- Songwriter(s): David Arnold; Shara Nelson

Shara Nelson singles chronology
"'Rough with the Smooth'" (1995)	"I Fell (So You Could Catch Me)" (1996)	"'Good Intentions'" (1996)

Alternative covers
- CD single Part 2

Shara Nelson - I Fell (So You Could Catch Me) (1996)

"I Fell (So You Could Catch Me)" is a song by British singer Shara Nelson, released as a second single from her second solo album, Friendly Fire in 1996 on Cooltempo Records as a two CD set.

== Track listing ==
I Fell (So You Could Catch Me) Part 1

- UK CD Single #7243 8 82754 2 2
1. "I Fell (So You Could Catch Me)" (Album Edit) 4:21
2. "I Fell (So You Could Catch Me)" (Marc Brown Mix) 5:16
3. "I Fell (So You Could Catch Me)" (Mike Peden Mix) 5:44
4. "I Fell (So You Could Catch Me)" (Mekon Mix) 5:39

I Fell (So You Could Catch Me) Part 2

- UK CD Single #7243 8 82755 2 1
1. "I Fell (So You Could Catch Me)" (Album Edit) 4:20
2. "Down That Road" (Radio Edit) 3:47
3. "I Fell (So You Could Catch Me)" (Orchestral Version) 4:24
4. "Uptight" (7" Edit)

== Charts ==
Chart (1996)	Peak position
Scotland (OCC)	84
UK Singles (OCC)	76
