= Uptight =

Uptight may refer to:

== Film and television ==
- Uptight (film), also known as Up Tight!, a 1968 American film directed by Jules Dassin
- Uptight (TV series), a 1960s Australian pop music programme
- "Uptight (Oliver's Alright)", an episode of Hannah Montana

== Music ==
- UpTight (soundtrack), a soundtrack album from the 1968 film, by Booker T. & the MG's
- Up-Tight, a 1966 album by Stevie Wonder
- "Uptight (Everything's Alright)", a 1966 song by Stevie Wonder
- Up Tight! (album), a 1961 album by Gene Ammons
- "Uptight" (Share Nelson song), 1994
- "Uptight", a song by Green Day from Nimrod
- "Uptight", a song by The Hives from Tyrannosaurus Hives
- "Uptight", a song by Imagine Dragons from the EP Imagine Dragons
