= The Other Side (Lynden David Hall album) =

Studio album by Lynden David Hall
- Released: 29 May 2000
- Genres: R&B, neo-soul
- Length: 60:15
- Label: Cooltempo

Lynden David Hall chronology
Medicine 4 My Pain (1997)	The Other Side (2000)	In Between Jobs (2005)

Singles from The Other Side
- 1. "Forgive Me" Released: 28 February 2000; 2. "Sleeping with Victor" Released: 15 May 2000; 3. "Let's Do It Again" Released: 11 September 2000

The Other Side is the second album by British R&B singer Lynden David Hall, released in 2000 on the Cooltempo label. It peaked at No. 36 on the UK Albums Chart.

== Track listing ==
All tracks composed by Lynden David Hall.

1. "If I Had to Choose" – 4:08
2. "Forgive Me" – 3:58
3. "Say It Ain't So" – 4:14
4. "U Let Him Have U" – 4:53
5. "Hard Way" – 3:50
6. "Where's God?" – 4:18
7. "To Be a Man" – 5:32
8. "The Other Side" – 4:00
9. "Don't Wanna Talk" – 3:37
10. "Wanna Be Another You" – 5:21
11. "Sleeping with Victor" – 3:35
12. "Dead and Gone" – 4:56
13. "Let's Do It Again" – 4:10
14. "Are We Still Cool?" – 3:43

== Singles ==
- 2000 - "Forgive Me" (UK #30)
- 2000 - "Sleeping with Victor" (UK #49)
- 2000 - "Let's Do It Again" (UK #69)
