= Good Intentions =

Good Intentions may refer to:

== Films ==
- Good Intentions (2010 film)
- Good Intentions (1930 film)

== Music ==
- Good Intentions (album), a 2020 album by Nav
- "Good Intentions" (EP), a 1996 song by Groove Corporation
- "Good Intentions" (Dappy song), a 2012 song by N-Dubz member Dappy from the album Bad Intentions
- "Good Intentions" (Toad the Wet Sprocket song), a single by Toad the Wet Sprocket on the album In Light Syrup
- "Good Intentions", a 1982 song by Gerry Rafferty from the album Sleepwalking
- "Good Intentions", a 1954 song by Rosemary Clooney on the album Red Garters
- "Good Intentions", a 2015 song by Disclosure from the 2015 album Caracal
- "Good Intentions", a 2022 song by Fitz and the Tantrums from the 2022 album Let Yourself Free

== Other ==
- Good Intentions, the fourth book of the collected poems of Ogden Nash, published 1942
- "Good Intentions" (Justified), 2014 TV episode

== See also ==
- The road to hell is paved with good intentions
