= Uptight (Shara Nelson song) =

1994 single by Shara Nelson

Single by Shara Nelson

from the album What Silence Knows
- B-side: "What Silence Knows"
- Released: 31 January 1994
- Length: 5:04
- Label: Cooltempo
- Songwriters: Attrell Cordes; Shara Nelson
- Producer: Michael Peden

Shara Nelson singles chronology
"Inside Out" (1993)	"Uptight" (1994)	"Nobody" (1994)

Audio sample
- file; help

"Uptight" is a song by English singer-songwriter Shara Nelson, released in January 1994 by Cooltempo Records as the fourth single from her first solo album, What Silence Knows (1993). Co-written by Nelson with Attrell Cordes, the song was produced by Michael Peden and became a top-20 hit in the UK, peaking at numbers 19 on the UK Singles Chart. The accompanying music video was directed by Kevin Bray and filmed in the US.

== Critical reception ==
Alan Jones from Music Week gave the song a score of four out of five and named it Pick of the Week, saying, "It's a perky uptempo song, with a funky, shuffling Motown-esque beat, and great pop potential." He added that Nelson "is certain of another Top 40 hit". Pan-European magazine Music & Media wrote, "It's hard to keep your cool with this funky groover, with Miss Nelson wrapping her vocals around the staccato sung chorus." Terry Staunton from NME wrote, "This isn't quite up to that mark [as 'Down That Road' and 'One Goodbye in Ten'], but it's still a glorious record, reminiscent of Motown in the good old days." Andy Beevers from the Record Mirror Dance Update noted Nelson's "atmospheric vocal", while James Hamilton named it a "plaintive jiggly roller" in his weekly dance column. Jonathan Bernstein from Spin noted the song's "insecurity".

== Music video ==
The music video for "Uptight" was directed by American director Kevin Bray and produced by Lisa Bonahan for DNA. It was released on 7 February 1994 and features Nelson tramping the chilly streets of New York City accompanied by a cast of locals.

== Track listings ==
- UK CD single (7243 8 81184 2 2)
1. "Uptight" (Uno Perfecto Edit) - 4:30
2. "Uptight" (Uno Perfecto Mix) - 7:05
3. "Uptight" (Dirty Lowdown Vocal Mix) - 5:30
4. "What Silence Knows" (Unreleased Version) - 7:52
- European CD single (7243 8 81186 2 0)
1. "Uptight" (Uno Perfecto Edit) - 4:32
2. "Uptight" (Dirty Lowdown Dub) - 5:29
3. "Uptight" (Uno Perfecto Mix) - 7:06

== Charts ==
=== Weekly charts ===
Chart (1994)	Peak position
Australia (ARIA)	217
Europe (Eurochart Hot 100)	52
Israel (Israeli Singles Chart)	18
UK Singles (OCC)	19
UK Airplay (Music Week)	9
UK Dance (Music Week)	12
UK Club Chart (Music Week)	23

=== Year-end charts ===
Chart (1994)	Position
UK Singles (OCC)	195

== Release history ==
Region	Date	Format(s)	Label(s)	Ref.
United Kingdom	31 January 1994	7-inch vinyl; 12-inch vinyl; CD; cassette	Cooltempo	
Australia	18 April 1994	CD; cassette	Cooltempo	
