= Daydreaming (Massive Attack song) =

Single by Massive Attack with Shara Nelson

from the album Blue Lines
- B-side: "Any Love"
- Released: 15 October 1990
- Recorded: 1990
- Genre: Trip hop; alternative hip hop
- Length: 4:12
- Label: Wild Bunch
- Songwriter(s): Grantley Marshall; Andrew Vowles; Robert Del Naja; Shara Nelson; Adrian Thaws; Wally Badarou
- Producer(s): Massive Attack; Jonny Dollar

Massive Attack with Shara Nelson singles chronology
"Any Love" (1988)	"Daydreaming" (1990)	"Unfinished Sympathy" (1991)

Shara Nelson singles chronology
"Can't Get Over You" (1986)	"Daydreaming" (1990)	"Unfinished Sympathy" (1991)

Audio sample
- Massive Attack with Shara Nelson - Daydreaming (1990): file; help

"Daydreaming" is a song by Massive Attack with vocals by Shara Nelson. The song samples "Mambo" by Wally Badarou (the "fifth member" of Level 42), from his album Echoes (1984). "Daydreaming" was released as a single on 15 October 1990, six months before their debut album Blue Lines. It reached #81 in the UK Singles Chart.

== Track listing ==
7" single (WBRS 1)

1. "Daydreaming" – 4:12
2. "Daydreaming" (Instrumental) – 4:45

12" single (WBRT 1)

1. "Daydreaming" – 4:12
2. "Daydreaming" (Instrumental) – 4:45
3. "Any Love" (2) - 4:16

CD single (WBRX 1)

1. "Daydreaming" – 4:12
2. "Daydreaming" (Instrumental) – 4:45
3. "Any Love" (2) - 4:16

12" remix single (WBRR 1)

1. "Daydreaming" (Luv It Mix) – 5:27
2. "Daydreaming" (Brixton Bass Mix) – 5:22
3. "Daydreaming" (Luv It Dub) - 5:26

== Charts ==
=== Weekly charts ===
Chart (1990)	Peak position
UK Singles Chart	81
