= Baggies =

Baggies may refer to:

- Baggies (trousers), a type of jeans in the United Kingdom in the 1980s
- Baggies (boardshorts), another name for boardshorts, especially in South Africa
- "The Baggie" or "the Hefty Bag", part of the right-field wall of the Hubert H. Humphrey Metrodome in Minneapolis, Minnesota, US
- "The Baggies", a nickname for West Bromwich Albion F.C., an English football club
- Baggies, food storage bags made by Pactiv Corporation
