= What Silence Knows =

Studio album by Shara Nelson
- Released: 20 September 1993
- Genres: British soul; downtempo; trip hop
- Length: 48:18
- Label: Cooltempo
- Producer: Michael Peden

Shara Nelson chronology
What Silence Knows (1993)	Friendly Fire (1995)

Singles from What Silence Knows
- 1. "Down That Road" Released: 12 July 1993; 2. "One Goodbye in Ten" Released: 30 August 1993; 3. "Inside Out" Released: 8 November 1993; 4. "Uptight" Released: 31 January 1994; 5. "Nobody" Released: 23 May 1994; 6. "Inside Out" / "Down That Road (remix)" Released: 30 August 1994

Professional ratings
Review scores
Source	Rating
Chicago Reader	(favorable)
Los Angeles Times	3/4 stars
Melody Maker	(favorable)
Music Week	4/5 stars
NME	6/10
Select	3/5 medals
Spin	(favorable)

What Silence Knows is the debut solo album by English singer Shara Nelson, released in September 1993 on Cooltempo Records. It includes five singles which reached the UK Singles Chart: "Down That Road", "One Goodbye in Ten", "Inside Out", "Uptight" and "Nobody". The album peaked at No. 22 on the UK Albums Chart and was later certified Gold by the British Phonographic Industry for sales in excess of 100,000 copies.

The album was shortlisted for the 1994 Mercury Music Prize.

== Critical reception ==
Alan Jones from Music Week wrote, "A glittering solo debut for this talented vocalist. The current single, "One Goodbye in Ten", is particularly fine: a rich string arrangement underpinning a Sixties feel. Other tracks, such as "Nobody", recall her past with Massive Attack, while the vox/piano style of "Inside Out" has a haunting, stark beauty. Could be a Dina Carroll-style breakout." Adam Higginbotham from Select said, "It's a tremendous soul album, with Nelson's searing voice matched to a full spectrum of musical textures and resonant lyrics that will frighten the pants off Derek and Shirley canoodling on the sofa in Swindon."

== Track listing ==
1. "Nobody" (Shara Nelson, Kenny Nicholas, Trevor Jacobs, Suni Suleynan) – 4:22
2. "Pain Revisited" (Shara Nelson, Howie Bernstein) – 5:16
3. "One Goodbye in Ten" (Shara Nelson, Bob Stanley, Pete Wiggs) – 5:50
4. "Inside Out" (Shara Nelson, Kevin Armstrong) – 3:19
5. "Uptight" (Shara Nelson, Prince Be) – 5:04
6. "Down That Road" (Shara Nelson, Prince Be) – 5:15
7. "Chance" (Shara Nelson, Kenny Nicholas, Trevor Jacobs, Suni Suleynan) – 3:58
8. "Thoughts of You" (Shara Nelson, John Coxon) – 4:16
9. "How Close" (Shara Nelson, Prince Be) – 3:59
10. "What Silence Knows" (Shara Nelson, Style Scott) – 6:59

== Personnel ==
- Shara Nelson – vocals
- Billy Liesegang, G.A. Parricelli – guitar
- Mike Peden – bass
- Mel Wesson – keyboards, synthesizer
- Michael Timothy, Pete Wingfield – keyboards
- Rupert Brown, Trevor Murrell – drums
- Miles Bould – percussion
- Lyn Gerald, Tee Green – backing vocals
- Philip D. Todd – flute, electronic wind instrument
- London Session Orchestra – strings
- Nick Ingman – string arrangements
- Gavyn Wright – orchestral leader and conductor

== Charts ==
=== Album ===
Chart (1993)	Peak position
Australian Albums Chart	131
Austrian Albums Chart	32
UK Albums Chart	22

=== Singles ===
Year	Single	UK chart
1993	"Down That Road"	19
1993	"One Goodbye in Ten"	21
1993	"Inside Out"	–
1994	"Uptight"	19
1994	"Nobody"	49
1994	"Inside Out" / "Down That Road" (remix)	34
