= Rough with the Smooth =

1995 single by Shara Nelson

Single by Shara Nelson

from the album Friendly Fire
- Released: 4 September 1995
- Length: 5:58
- Label: Cooltempo
- Songwriters: Ashley Beedle; Shara Nelson; Marc Woolford
- Producer: Michael Peden

Shara Nelson singles chronology
"Inside Out" / "Down That Road" (1994)	"Rough with the Smooth" (1995)	"I Fell (So You Could Catch Me)" (1996)

Audio sample
- file; help

"Rough with the Smooth" is a song by British singer-songwriter Shara Nelson, released in September 1995 by Cooltempo Records as the first single from her second solo album, Friendly Fire (1995). The song was written by Nelson with Ashley Beedle and Marc Woolford, and produced by Michael Peden. It peaked at number 30 on the UK Singles Chart and number 21 on the European Dance Radio Chart.

== Critical reception ==
David Hemingway from Melody Maker commented, "'Rough with the Smooth' starts with the flourish of strings that we've come to expect. Thirty seconds in and I had great plans for Single of the Week — a minute later it's become, bizarrely, 'The Kids from Fame'." Pan-European magazine Music & Media named the song Single of the Week, writing, "Many so-called "dance divas" pretend they can sing; Shara is for real. Mixing her smooth vocals with the fairly rough backing, composition and arrangement are almost restyled Bacharach/David." Johnny Cigarettes from NME said, "'Rough with the Smooth' is a swaying, swinging gospel-inflected love song that's not quite in the same league as such epic spine-tinglers as 'One Goodbye in Ten' or 'Inside Out', but will still make your coffee table move its feet. Which is quite an achievement, when you think about it."

== Track listing ==
- UK CD single (7243 8 82424 2 4)
1. "Rough with the Smooth" (7-inch edit) – 3:51
2. "Rough with the Smooth" (Street Level mix) – 4:48
3. "Rough with the Smooth" (extended album mix) – 5:26
4. "Rough with the Smooth" (Long Island Expressway mix) – 8:22
5. "Rough with the Smooth" (Franktified dub) – 7:54
6. "Rough with the Smooth" (Saturday Night at the Glasshouse mix) – 4:56

== Charts ==
Chart (1995)	Peak position
Australia (ARIA)	223
Europe (European Dance Radio)	21
Scotland (OCC)	43
UK Singles (OCC)	30
