= Unfinished Sympathy =

1991 single by Massive Attack

Single by Massive

from the album Blue Lines
- Released: 11 February 1991
- Studio: Coach House (Bristol, England); Abbey Road (London, England)
- Genre: Trip hop; chill-out
- Length: 5:12 (original version)
- Label: Wild Bunch; Virgin
- Songwriters: Robert Del Naja; Grantley Marshall; Shara Nelson; Jonathan Sharp; Andrew Vowles
- Producers: Massive Attack; Jonny Dollar

Massive singles chronology
"Daydreaming" (1990)	"Unfinished Sympathy" (1991)	"Safe from Harm" (1991)

Audio sample
- file; help

Music video
- "Unfinished Sympathy" on YouTube

"Unfinished Sympathy" is a song by the English trip hop group Massive Attack. It was released on 11 February 1991 under the temporary group name Massive. The song was written by the three band members Robert "3D" Del Naja, Andrew "Mushroom" Vowles and Grant "Daddy G" Marshall, the song's vocalist Shara Nelson and the group's co-writer and co-producer Jonathan "Jonny Dollar" Sharp. It was released on 11 February 1991 as the second single from the band's first album, Blue Lines (1991), on the band's Wild Bunch label distributed by Circa Records. The name "Massive" was used to avoid a radio ban, as the track's release coincided with the Gulf War. Produced by Massive Attack and Sharp, the song incorporates various musical elements into its arrangement, including vocal and percussion samples, drum programming and string orchestration, composed by Jonny Dollar and later arranged by Wil Malone.

"Unfinished Sympathy" topped the Dutch Top 40 and was a top-20 hit on the singles charts of several countries, including Germany, Switzerland and the United Kingdom. The accompanying music video, directed by Baillie Walsh, was a single continuous shot of Nelson walking through a Los Angeles neighbourhood, oblivious to her surroundings. Regarded by music journalist Sean O'Hagan as a song that influenced generations of electronic musicians, and was a pioneering song in the development of British dance music, "Unfinished Sympathy" was acclaimed by music critics for its production and Nelson's vocals. It ranked highly on several publications' year-end lists of the best singles of 1991, and has since appeared in many polls of the best songs of all time by both music critics and the public worldwide. The song was later used on the soundtrack of the 1993 film Sliver. It was covered by American singer Tina Turner on her 1996 album Wildest Dreams.

== Writing and recording ==
The singer Shara Nelson met the members of Massive Attack when they were part of the Bristol sound system collective the Wild Bunch, and sang on their 1986 single "The Look of Love". "Unfinished Sympathy" developed from a song Nelson had been writing, which she had provisionally titled "Kiss and Tell". While Massive Attack were working on their debut album, Blue Lines, in Bristol's Coach House studio, they overheard Nelson singing the melody to herself. They and the producer, Jonny Dollar, saw potential in the song and encouraged her to develop it.

Massive Attack, Nelson and Dollar worked on the song during a jam session, using a drum machine, keyboards and Nelson's vocals. It acquired the name "Unfinished Sympathy" – a pun on Franz Schubert's 1822 "Unfinished Symphony" – during this session. The Massive Attack member Robert Del Naja said: "I hate putting a title to anything without a theme, but with 'Unfinished Sympathy', we'd started with a jam... The title came up as a joke at first, but it fitted the song and the arrangements so perfectly, we just had to use it."

The orchestral section was originally composed by Dollar and played on a synthesiser, but, according to the Massive Attack member Andrew Vowles, "The synth sounded too tacky, so we thought we may as well use real strings. The orchestra definitely changed the feeling of the song, making it heavier and deeper with more feeling." Dollar, who was not classically trained to orchestrate strings, contacted the music producer Wil Malone to arrange and conduct them, which were eventually recorded in Abbey Road Studios, London. According to Vowles, the orchestra "were really good [but] it took them about five takes to do it because they were slightly behind the beat". Massive Attack had not taken the cost of the orchestra into account when planning the budget for Blue Lines, and had to sell their car to pay for it.

== Composition ==
A trip hop song, "Unfinished Sympathy" incorporates drum programming and scratching performed by Mushroom into its arrangement; John Bush of AllMusic refers to these elements as references to the group's "b-boy past." The song's initial tone is set by "chilled hip hop beats" and samples of a percussion break from "Parade Strut (Instrumental)" by J. J. Johnson. Notably, the original album version of "Unfinished Sympathy" does not have a traditional bass line. Vocal samples of a man singing "hey, hey, hey, hey..." – originating from John McLaughlin and the Mahavishnu Orchestra's "Planetary Citizen" – are present throughout the song.

== Release ==
"Unfinished Sympathy" was released as the second single from Blue Lines on 11 February 1991. As the single was released in the midst of the Gulf War, the word "attack" was temporarily dropped from the group's name at the advice of their record company and management. The name "Massive Attack" had previously been deemed "unpatriotic" by the BBC – thus, the name change was carried out to prevent the single from being banned from airplay. The single was a commercial success for the group, managing to chart highly in several European countries. "Unfinished Sympathy" became a number-one hit on the Dutch Top 40 and peaked at number two on the Dutch Mega Single Top 100 chart. It also gave the group their first major hit in the United Kingdom, where it peaked at number 13 on the UK Singles Chart, remaining on the chart for nine weeks. But on the UK Dance Singles Chart, it hit number three. The single reached the top ten in Switzerland and the top twenty in Germany and the Flanders region of Belgium. Outside of Europe, it peaked at number 48 in New Zealand.

== Critical reception ==
"Unfinished Sympathy" received acclaim. Jim Arundel from Melody Maker wrote, "It'll be the "When a Man Loves a Woman" of its time, mark me well." Barbara Ellen from NME named it Single of the Week and called it "an intense, warmblooded dance track that boasts more fire in its balls than the Pixies ever dug for", a reference to the Pixies' recently released single "Dig for Fire". Another editor, Mandi James, expanded, "Lush and extravagant, plied with rich strings and roving keyboards, this is music with depth and grace. Massive aren't afraid to indulge their imaginations and let themselves go. Plaintive vocals that smack of Randy Crawford, smart samples liberated from the Mahavishnu Orchestra and all the romanticism of the Pet Shop Boys without the clipped, camp edge. Those not completely smitten by this record have no soul." Record Mirror also named it single of the week and wrote, "The wisely understated production allows both the beauty of the swelling strings and the emotional pull of the vocals to shine through. Fiendishly expert with rhythms, too cerebral to be termed just a dance act, Massive can't put a foot wrong." Melody Maker named "Unfinished Sympathy" its Single of the Year, writing that it would "unquestionably stand as one of the greatest soul records of all time". NME named it the year's eighth-best single.

The BBC journalist Stuart Bailie later wrote that "Unfinished Sympathy" had "an emotional power that was hard to figure. It sounded anxious and lost. But there was a grandeur in the music also. People who came across the record became obsessed, spinning it endlessly." In 2010, Pitchfork ranked it the 44th-best track of the 1990s.

== Music video ==
A partial map of West Pico Boulevard (Los Angeles), with the path Nelson takes in the video marked in grey

The music video for "Unfinished Sympathy" (a docu-fiction) was directed by Baillie Walsh, who had also directed the video for Massive Attack's previous single "Daydreaming", and was filmed in a single continuous shot from 1311 South New Hampshire Avenue to 2632 West Pico Boulevard in Los Angeles, California. The video, filmed on Steadicam, begins with a shot of a street gang before moving to follow Nelson walking along the pavement unaware or uncaring of her surroundings, which include drunks, bikers and disabled people. As the video progresses, first Daddy G, then 3D (having finished making a call on a public phone booth) and then Mushroom (pushing a cart) can be seen walking several paces behind her, slightly out of focus. At the end of the video, Nelson walks past the camera and off down the road into the distance. The video was originally supposed to conclude with an overhead shot of Los Angeles, but the scene was not used.

Not all of the people in the video were actors: 3D told Melody Maker that "some of them were extras. And some of them couldn't be f***ed to get off the street. The gang at the beginning with the dog – they were real, they lived there." The performance artist Leigh Bowery was the video's art director; the group later described him as "definitely the most outrageous character", recalling, "Because we weren't part of that London scene, he tried to dress down and go low-key around us. This basically meant he turned up to the shoot for 'Unfinished' in LA, dressed in this mental outfit, like a faux-Manc casual. Massive parka, a mad pudding-basin wig, big Stone Roses baggies, and dripping with sweat."

Dan Kneece, best known for his work on the 1986 film Blue Velvet, operated the Steadicam for the video shoot. 3D said that Kneece was one of the main reasons why they had chosen to shoot the video in Los Angeles, "because there aren't many people [in the UK] who have the expertise to hold a Steadycam on their back for five minutes", the other reason being "the light, because you can't get that kind of golden light anywhere else". Kneece recalled that the shoot started with him on a Shotmaker arm on which he filmed the gang before being lifted into the air and then down again, at which point he had to take a running jump off the arm onto the sidewalk to follow Nelson. Six takes were recorded before Kneece became too exhausted to carry the camera any more. The equipment used for the filming included an Arriflex III camera, a Cooke 3:1 zoom lens, and a 400-foot (120 m) camera magazine. The camera shot at a slightly lower frame rate since the song was longer than the amount of film the camera could shoot at 24 fps. To compensate, the audio track was mildly sped up on set to match the new camera speed, and then it could be converted back to normal speed in post-production. Sean O'Hagan of The Guardian described the video as a "benchmark in modern video direction, more a breathtaking short film than a mere pop promo".

== Track listing ==
- 7-inch (WBRS 2)
1. "Unfinished Sympathy" (Nellee Hooper 7-inch mix) – 4:34
2. "Unfinished Sympathy" – 5:12
- 12-inch (WBRT 2)
1. "Unfinished Sympathy" (Paul Oakenfold mix) – 5:18
2. "Unfinished Sympathy" (Paul Oakenfold instrumental mix) – 5:18
3. "Unfinished Sympathy" – 5:12
4. "Unfinished Sympathy" (instrumental) – 4:08
- CD (WBRX 2)
1. "Unfinished Sympathy" (Paul Oakenfold mix) – 5:18
2. "Unfinished Sympathy" (Paul Oakenfold instrumental mix) – 5:18
3. "Unfinished Sympathy" – 5:12
4. "Unfinished Sympathy" (instrumental) – 4:08
- 12-inch remixes (WBRR 2)
1. "Unfinished Sympathy" (Nellee Hooper 12-inch mix) – 5:50
2. "Unfinished Sympathy" (Nellee Hooper instrumental mix) – 5:34
3. "Unfinished Sympathy" (original) – 5:12

== Credits and personnel ==
Credits are adapted from Blue Lines liner notes.

Recording

- Engineered and recorded in Abbey Road Studios, London
- Mixed at the Matrix Recording Studios, London
- Recorded at Coach House, Bristol
- Strings conducted and recorded in Dublin and Abbey Road Studios, London

Personnel

- Jeremy Allom – engineering, mixing
- Haydn Bendall – engineering
- Robert Del Naja – production, songwriting
- Grantley Marshall – production, songwriting
- Wil Malone – arrangement, conducting
- Shara Nelson – songwriting, vocals
- Jonathan Sharp – production, songwriting
- Gavyn Wright – lead violin
- Andrew Vowles – production, scratching, songwriting

== Charts ==
=== Weekly charts ===
Chart (1991)	Peak position
Australia (ARIA)	95
Belgium (Ultratop 50 Flanders)	15
Europe (Eurochart Hot 100)	25
Germany (GfK)	17
Ireland (IRMA)	21
Luxembourg (Radio Luxembourg)	11
Netherlands (Dutch Top 40)	1
Netherlands (Single Top 100)	2
New Zealand (Recorded Music NZ)	48
Sweden (Sverigetopplistan)	40
Switzerland (Schweizer Hitparade)	9
UK Singles (Official Charts)	13
UK Airplay (Music Week)	18
UK Dance (Music Week)	3
UK Club Chart (Record Mirror)	5

=== Year-end charts ===
Chart (1991)	Position
Germany (Media Control)	83
Netherlands (Dutch Top 40)	38
Netherlands (Single Top 100)	26
UK Club Chart (Record Mirror)	68

== Certifications ==
Region	Certification	Certified units/sales
United Kingdom (BPI)	Platinum	600,000^{‡}
^{‡} Sales+streaming figures based on certification alone.
