= Safe from Harm (song) =

1991 single by Massive Attack

Single by Massive Attack

from the album Blue Lines
- Released: 27 May 1991
- Genre: Trip hop
- Length: 5:18
- Label: Virgin
- Songwriters: Grantley Marshall; Andrew Vowles; Robert Del Naja; Shara Nelson; Billy Cobham
- Producers: Massive Attack; Jonny Dollar

Massive Attack singles chronology
"Unfinished Sympathy" (1991)	"Safe from Harm" (1991)	"'Massive Attack EP'" (1992)

Shara Nelson singles chronology
"Unfinished Sympathy" (1991)	"Safe from Harm" (1991)	"Down That Road" (1993)

Audio sample
- Massive Attack with Shara Nelson - Safe From Harm (7-inch version) (1991): file; help

"Safe from Harm" is the third single and opening track from Blue Lines, the 1991 debut album from British trip hop collective Massive Attack, with vocals by Shara Nelson and Robert Del Naja. It was released in May 1991 by Virgin Records. The bass, guitar, and drums are sampled from the song "Stratus" by Billy Cobham, from his album Spectrum (with guitar by Tommy Bolin). Additional drums are sampled from "Good Old Music" by Funkadelic. Other samples come from Herbie Hancock's "Chameleon", and some of the background vocals are based on Johnny "Guitar" Watson's 1961 song Looking Back.

"Safe from Harm" (Perfecto Mix) is featured at the end of the Michael Mann-directed movie The Insider.

== Inspiration ==
The liner notes to Blue Lines mention the movie Taxi Driver as an influence.

== Critical reception ==
Andrew Smith from Melody Maker described "Safe from Harm" as a "swooning, sultry cut" and "no less compelling than 'Unfinished Sympathy.'" He added that it's "gathered round a deep, dense, dubbesque bassline, while ethereal strings and gently gliding pianos taunt Shara Nelson's sweet voice. It's a decadent, mesmeric, trance-inducing sound, one to lose yourself in completely." Pan-European magazine Music & Media wrote, "With the atmospheric synthesizer sounds, the hefty bassline and the irresistible vocals by Shara Nelson, this follow-up to the European hit 'Unfinished Sympathy' is likely to be as big." Barbara Ellen from NME named it Single of the Week. Mark Frith from Smash Hits commented, "Like the London Funki Dreds, the music of Bristol's Massive has a pounding bass line and reggae overtones, but Massive's records are also highly reminiscent of American soul music. 'Safe from Harm' works best as part of an LP, but still sounds good as a single."

== Track listing ==
1. "Safe from Harm" (radio edit) – 4:28
2. "Safe from Harm" (12-inch version) – 6:57
3. "Safe from Harm" (7-inch version) – 4:28
4. "Safe from Harm" (Perfecto mix) – 8:09
5. "Safe from Harm" (Just a Dub) (by Steve Smith) – 3:14
6. "Safe from Harm" (Just a Groove Dub) (by Steve Smith) – 3:18

== Charts ==
Chart (1991)	Peak position
Australia (ARIA)	132
Austria (Ö3 Austria Top 40)	23
Europe (Eurochart Hot 100)	48
Germany (GfK)	33
Netherlands (Dutch Top 40)	28
Netherlands (Single Top 100)	28
Switzerland (Schweizer Hitparade)	15
UK Singles (Official Charts)	25
UK Airplay (Music Week)	23
UK Dance (Music Week)	6
UK Club Chart (Record Mirror)	13
US Alternative Airplay (Billboard)	28
US Dance Club Songs (Billboard)	35
US Dance Singles Sales (Billboard)	32
