= Earthphish =

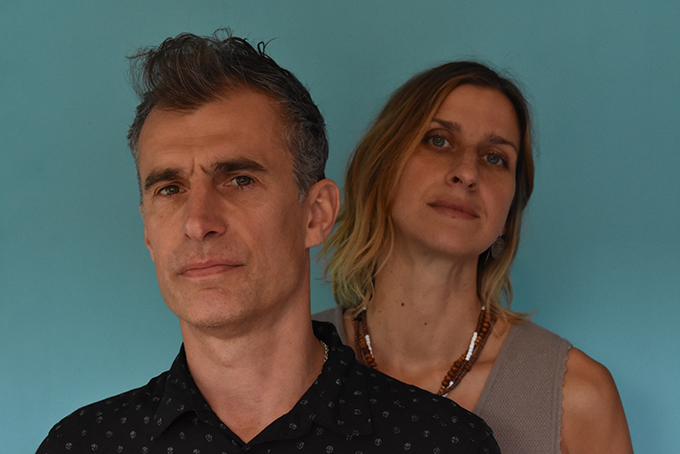
- Donovan John Szypura and Aleksandra Mirjana Crossan in Australia 2019

Background information
- Origin: Zurich, Switzerland
- Genres: Electronic music, trip hop
- Years active: 2001–2006, 2019–present
- Labels: Parakosm
- Members: Donovan John Szypura, Aleksandra Mirjana Crossan
- Past members: André Ledergerber
- Website: www.earthphish.com

Earthphish is a music group formed in Switzerland in 2001, consisting of Aleksandra Mirjana Crossan, Donovan John Szypura and formerly André Ledergerber. Their debut album "Soft Green Exit" (CD) was released independently in 2003. Their song "Soulcandy" reached #1 on the electronic music charts on the online community GarageBand.com The music of Earthphish has been compared to trip hop artists such as Tricky, Massive Attack and Portishead.

== History ==
Keyboarder, composer and producer Donovan John Szypura played with Matthew Ashman (Adam & The Ants, Bow Wow Wow) in a Swiss punk rock band called "Rams". They worked together on the album "Wrecked" which was released in 1993. In 1999 Donovan John Szypura joined the industrial metal band Apollyon Sun formed by singer/guitarist Thomas Gabriel Fischer (Celtic Frost, Hellhammer, Triptykon) and guitarist Erol Unala. In early 2001 Donovan teamed up with drummer André Ledergerber and choreographer and singer Aleksandra Mirjana Crossan. The trio Earthphish released their demo CD "Metropolis" three months later.

The name Earthphish evolved from an early dance piece called "Earthphish & Ishram" choreographed by Aleksandra Mirjana Crossan. Earthphish converted to a creative production duo not limited to music. Aleksandra Mirjana Crossan and Donovan John Szypura became a symbiosis of music and dance and created several dance pieces performed by their contemporary dance company, Earthphish Dance.

Earthphish Dance received the Swiss Premio Furthering Prize for their dance piece in 2002 and won the second place for the same dance piece at the International Serge Diaghilev Competition of Choreography Art 2003 in Gdynia, Poland in 2003.

The Earthphish debut album "Soft Green Exit" (CD) was released independently in 2003.

Earthphish Dance premiered "Elephant Man" in Zurich, Switzerland in 2005. The dance piece was inspired by the movie 'The Elephant Man' directed by David Lynch, which is about the life of Joseph Carey Merrick.

In June 2006, Earthphish released their self-titled EP "Earthphish".

Earthphish is now based in Tasmania, Australia. In March 2019 Earthphish announced on their Facebook page that they are working on a new album. In August 2020 they released their first single "Rite Of Life". The following singles "Raincoat" was released in September 2020 and ended up on Trip Hop Nation’s compilation "Best Release of the year 2020". The third single "Deadlock" was released in October 2020 and featured Dub music and Reggae legend Lee Scratch Perry. Their album "Turtles All The Way Down" was released on 21 December 2020 and has been selected in Trip Hop Nation’s list of "50 best albums of 2020". Earthphish further released two more singles, "Between the Bars", a cover version of artist Elliott Smith released in 2021, and "In the Hallway" released in 2022.

== Style ==
Earthphish has not limited themselves to create music but also produced contemporary dance pieces. Their music is atmospheric, dark and bittersweet, surrealistic and often describing human struggles. Their music style has been described as electronic and trip hop. Their dance pieces have addressed social issues through abstract visual movement supported by original music compositions.

Earthphish acknowledge that they have been influenced by The Sandals, Tricky, Portishead, Eurythmics, and Killing Joke.

== Discography ==
- "Metropolis" (Demo-CD) 2001
- "Soft Green Exit" (CD) 2003
- "Earthphish" (EP) 2006
- "Rite Of Life" (Single) 2020
- "Raincoat" (Single) 2020
- "Deadlock feat. Lee Scratch Perry" (Single) 2020
- "Turtles All The Way Down" (Album) 2020
- "Between the Bars" (Single) 2021
- "In the Hallway" (Single) 2022

== Band members ==
=== Current lineup ===
- Aleksandra Mirjana Crossan – keyboards, vocals (2001–present)
- Donovan John Szypura – producing, keyboards, programming, vocals (2001–present)

=== Former members ===
- André Ledergerber – drums (2001-2003)

=== Additional studio musicians ===
- Merlin Szy – co-producing and programming on "Turtles All The Way Down" (Album) 2020
- Sandro Corbat – guitar on "Soft Green Exit" (CD) 2006 and "Turtles All The Way Down" (Album) 2020
- Dede Felix – co-producing and drums on "Soft Green Exit" (CD) 2003 and "Earthphish" (EP) 2006
- Luca Leombruni – bass guitar on "Soft Green Exit" (CD) 2003, "Earthphish" (EP) 2006, "Turtles All The Way Down" (Album) 2020
- Dominic Ruegg (Cuthead) – guitar on "Earthphish" (EP) 2006

=== Featuring musicians ===
- Lee Scratch Perry – vocals on "Deadlock" - "Turtles All The Way Down" (Album) 2020
- Paris Burns – vocals on "Medusa" - "Turtles All The Way Down" (Album) 2020

== Dance pieces ==
- 2005 – "Cut Down", 8° festival internacional de danca em paisagens urbanas, Coimbra, Portugal
- 2005 – "Elephant Man", Theater Rigiblick, Zurich, Switzerland
- 2003 – "Time Square", Fabriktheater, Zurich, Switzerland
- 2003 – "Urgent Call", Tanzhaus Wasserwerk, Zurich, Switzerland
- 2002 – "Beyond Henry", EWZ, Zurich, Switzerland
- 2002 – "If I had a child", Premio furthering prize 2002, Zurich, Switzerland
- 2001 – "Earthphish & Ishram", Petits Fours, Fabriktheater Zurich, Switzerland

== Earthphish Dance members ==
- Aleksandra Mirjana Crossan – choreography
- Sabine Schindler, Thomas Dietlicher, Jennifer Matheja, Audrey Borthayre, Zoltan Farago, Renata Schiess and Sybille Koch – dance
- Donovan John Szypura, Aleksandra Mirjana Crossan, Sandro Corbat – music
- Daniel Boller – stage design

== Awards ==
- Swiss Premio Furthering Prize 2002 in Zurich, Switzerland - Earthphish Dance, "If I had a child"
- Second place at the ‘International Serge Diaghilev Competition of Choreography Art 2003 in Gdynia, Poland - Earthphish Dance, "If I had a child"
