= Medicine 4 My Pain =

Studio album by Lynden David Hall
- Released: 10 November 1997; 2 November 1998 (reissue)
- Genres: R&B, neo-soul
- Length: 64:56
- Label: Cooltempo
- Producers: Lynden David Hall, Bob Power

Lynden David Hall chronology
Medicine 4 My Pain (1997)	The Other Side (2000)

Singles from Medicine 4 My Pain
- 1. "Sexy Cinderella" Released: 13 October 1997; 2. "Do I Qualify?" Released: 2 March 1998; 3. "Crescent Moon" Released: 22 June 1998; 4. "Sexy Cinderella (C&J Remix)" Released: 19 October 1998; 5. "Medicine 4 My Pain" Released: 29 March 1999

Professional ratings
Review scores
Source	Rating
AllMusic	4/5 stars

Medicine 4 My Pain is the debut album by British R&B singer Lynden David Hall. The album was first released in November 1997 on the Cooltempo label and reached No. 166 on the UK Albums Chart. The album was a critical success, and was instrumental in Hall's winning of the 'Best Newcomer' award at the 1998 MOBO ceremony. The album was re-released on 2 November 1998 with new artwork and three bonus tracks. Paying tribute after Hall's death in 2006, disc jockey Ronnie Herel described Medicine 4 My Pain as "a landmark album for UK black music."

The re-released version of Medicine 4 My Pain peaked at No. 43 on the UK Albums Chart, and produced three top 50 singles.

== Track listing ==
All tracks composed by Lynden David Hall.

1. "Do I Qualify?" – 4:47
2. "Sexy Cinderella" – 4:40
3. "Crescent Moon" – 5:12
4. "There Goes My Sanity" – 5:16
5. "One Hundred Heart Attacks" – 4:43
6. "Livin' the Lie" – 5:11
7. "The Jimmy Lee Story" – 4:45
8. "Yellow in Blue" – 4:07
9. "I Wish I Knew" – 4:28
10. "Jennifer Smiles" – 4:20
11. "Medicine 4 My Pain" – 5:09
12. "Do Angels Cry?" – 4:09
13. "There Goes My Sanity" (Full Crew Mix) – 4:00
14. "Sexy Cinderella" (C&J Remix) – 4:00

== Singles ==
- 1997 - "Sexy Cinderella" (UK #45)
- 1997 - "Do I Qualify?" (UK #26)
- 1998 - "Crescent Moon" (UK #45)
- 1998 - "Sexy Cinderella (C&J Remix)" (UK #17)
- 1999 - "Medicine 4 My Pain"
