= Down That Road (Shara Nelson song) =

1993 single by Shara Nelson

Single by Shara Nelson

from the album What Silence Knows
- Released: 12 July 1993
- Genre: Pop-soul; dance pop
- Length: 5:15
- Label: Cooltempo
- Songwriters: Attrell Cordes; Shara Nelson
- Producer: Michael Peden

Shara Nelson singles chronology
"Safe from Harm" (1991)	"Down That Road" (1993)	"One Goodbye in Ten" (1993)
"Nobody" (1994)	"Inside Out" / "Down That Road" (1994)	"Rough with the Smooth" (1995)

Audio sample
- file; help

"Down That Road" is a song by British singer-songwriter Shara Nelson, released July 1993 on Cooltempo Records as the debut single from her first solo album, What Silence Knows (1993). The song was written by Nelson with Attrell Cordes and produced by Michael Peden. It peaked at number 19 on the UK Singles Chart, as well as number one on the European Dance Radio Chart, and also became a top-20 hit on the US Billboard Hot Dance Club Play chart. In West Asia, it became a top-30 hit in Israel. The accompanying music video sees the singer performing the song on a beach.

== Critical reception ==
Neil Spencer from The Guardian felt the song was "an explicit enough farewell note to the group [Massive Attack], a mix of bitterness and relief that told her former colleagues 'I swear I never knew/just what I could do'." In his weekly UK chart commentary, James Masterton wrote, "Shara Nelson makes her Top 40 debut with a fairly standard piece of pop-soul but with continued airplay may well breach the Top 10 if she is lucky." Andy Beevers from Music Week gave it four out of five, describing it as "a classy song that grows in stature the more you hear it." Paul Moody from NME named it Single of the Week, saying, "Ah!, the sweet dove of summer has arrived and everywhere people are kissing absolute strangers in broad daylight, throwing in grey day jobs and thumbing funky lifts across a sun-swept Europe. Or at least they would be it 'Down That Road' had its way. A delirious debut solo single from Shara Nelson..."

Brad Beatnik from the RM Dance Update wrote, "Strings, horns, funky keys and thumping rhythms are the hallmarks of this classy debut by the former Massive vocalist." He also described it as "poppy". Another RM editor, James Hamilton, declared it as a "plaintive Massive Attack girl's subtle anti-segregation message". Nilou Panahpour from Rolling Stones complimented it as "skillful, soulful dance pop." Miranda Sawyer from Select commented, "'Down That Road' oozes a similar sad and frightening quality [as 'Unfinished Sympathy']. On first listen. Then you realise that the label's wrong. It definitely says 33, if definitely does, but it's lying, and once adjusted to the correct speed of 45rpm, Shara's efforts lose their exciting other-worldiness and turn into competent, slick, easy-on-the-brain-cells soul. Shame really." The magazine's Adam Higginbotham wrote, "The safe-but-dull single 'Down That Road' [...] is merely one example of the results of Nelson's collaboration with a slew of songwriters."

== Track listings ==
- UK CD single (7243 8 80730 2 8)
1. "Down That Road" (Radio Edit) — 3:47
2. "Down That Road" (Perfecto Edit) — 4:37
3. "Down That Road" (Album Mix) — 5:18
4. "Down That Road" (Full Length Perfecto Mix) — 6:28
5. "Down That Road" (Barkin' Loud Mix) — 6:22
6. "Down That Road" (Frankie Foncett Mix) — 5:06
- European CD single (7243 8 80732 2 6)
1. "Down That Road" (Radio Edit) — 3:47
2. "Down That Road" (Perfecto Edit) — 4:37
3. "Down That Road" (Barkin' Loud Mix) — 6:22
4. "Down That Road" (Frankie Foncett Mix) — 5:06

== Charts ==
=== Weekly charts ===
Chart (1993–1995)	Peak position
Australia (ARIA)	102
Europe (Eurochart Hot 100)	71
Europe (European Dance Radio)	1
Europe (European Hit Radio)	39
Germany (GfK)	68
Iceland (Íslenski Listinn Topp 40)	28
Israel (Israeli Singles Chart)	23
Netherlands (Dutch Top 40 Tipparade)	16
Netherlands (Single Top 100 Tipparade)	4
New Zealand (Recorded Music NZ)	21
UK Singles (Official Charts)	19
UK Airplay (Music Week)	9
UK Dance (Music Week)	3
UK Club Chart (Music Week)	6
US Bubbling Under Hot 100 (Billboard)	9
US Hot Dance Club Play (Billboard)	16

=== Year-end charts ===
Chart (1993)	Position
Europe (European Dance Radio)	22

== Release history ==
Region	Version	Date	Format(s)	Label(s)	Ref.
United Kingdom	Original	12 July 1993	7-inch vinyl; 12-inch vinyl; CD; cassette	Cooltempo	
Australia	Original	16 August 1993	CD; cassette	Cooltempo	
United Kingdom	Remix with "Inside Out"	30 August 1994	12-inch vinyl; CD; cassette	Cooltempo	
United States	Original	2 May 1995	Contemporary hit radio	Chrysalis	
