= Metaphra =

English musical group

Metaphra are an English musical group from Bristol, England, consisting of Richard Gale and Marie Bolt, whilst sometimes citing a third member Rich Stealth, as guitarist. Metaphra also use guest instrumentalists such as saxophonist Gustave Savvy.

== History ==
Richard Gale and Marie Bolt met in 2007 in Bristol when both were working on different music projects. They shared a love of the trip hop sound prevalent in Bristol in the 1990s and decided to work together to experiment musically, fusing trip-hop with modern electronica, glitch, and dubstep genres.

Their blend of female vocals, bass-heavy yet laid-back rhythms, enchanting melodies, lush soundscapes, live instruments and cutting edge sound design takes listeners on an epic journey through sound.

The lyrical themes of their debut album, 'Kleptocracy' range from political commentary to love songs, to the fantastical and magical, and they aim to inspire.

Richard Gale, producer and musician and a lecturer in music technology and sound engineering at Deep Blue Sound in Plymouth and Camborne, had started playing guitar in city metal bands in his teens, before getting into production. He later played live electronic music at free parties and clubs around the UK, and was crowned UK Laptop Battle Champion 2006 and 2007. Richard also performs and Produces outside of Metaphra under the name Defazed, and is signed to Subtek Records.

Marie Bolt, vocalist and lyricist, has been singing and performing from a young age. She had also been mixing 'old skool' jungle and drum'n'bass at free parties, clubs and on pirate/internet radio around the UK from 2000, as well as performing as a vocalist on experimental electronica for Loaf Recordings.

Metaphra played at Run to the Sun in Newquay on the 'Unsigned' stage in May 2011, Glade Festival on The Inspiral Stage in June 2011 and now after a successful gig of their more ambient works at The Inspiral Lounge in Camden in August 2011, they have been asked back to support the infamous 'Banco De Gaia' on 5 November 2011.

== Releases ==
Metaphra have had a single release – their debut self-released album 'Kleptocracy' was released in June 2011.
