= Charles Webster (musician) =

British electronic music producer and DJ (born c. 1965)

- Born: c.1965 Matlock, Derbyshire, England
- Genres: House, downtempo, jazz, trip hop
- Occupations: DJ, producer
- Years active: Early 1980s–present
- Labels: Defected, Peacefrog, Remote, Love From San Francisco, Miso
- Website: www.charleswebster.net

Charles Webster is a British electronic music producer and DJ who specialises in producing house music, amongst several other genres, including downtempo and jazz. He has recorded under his own name as well as under a series of aliases including Presence, Furry Phreaks, and Love From San Francisco, and in collaboration with several other artists.

Webster ran the now-defunct record labels Remote and Love From San Francisco, but currently owns and operates his Miso Records label.

== History ==
Born in Matlock, Derbyshire, Charles Webster grew up in the Peak District. His father was an artist and his mother (in his own words) "just worked at whatever she felt like at the time", and his parents' record collection was an early influence, Webster stating that "it was when they got into Kraftwerk that I decided to become a musician". He got his first instruments at age 13 (guitar, synthesizer, and drum machine). He studied art in Derby before moving to Nottingham where he began playing in electronic bands (including Mile High Club) and started working in a restaurant – the owner of which also just happened to own the city's 'Garage Club', where he began performing.

Webster worked with US artists such as Juan Atkins, Derrick May, and Kevin Saunderson through his job as a recording engineer at Square Dance studios in Derby, and moved to San Francisco in 1992 where he started the Love From San Francisco label. This led to his music being released on other US labels.

Back in the UK in 1996, Webster started the Remote label. The All Systems Gone album, released in 1999 and credited to the ensemble Presence, which featured singers Shara Nelson, Sara Jay, and Steve Edwards, was described by Webster as "a collection of songs for the clubs and the home", and included the singles "Sense of Danger" (featuring Nelson), "Future Love", and "Better Day". The album was well received by critics, garnering an 11/10 rating from DJ magazine, and described by Allmusic as "Probably the first classic record of the 21st century."

Born on the 24th of July (Peacefrog Records) was recorded over an 18-month period between 1999 and 2000, and released in 2001, featuring contributions from Terra Deva, and Massive Attack vocalist Sara Jay. A remixed version of Born on the 24th of July was released in late 2003, featuring mixes by several Peacefrog label artists. After five years of touring and production, 2007 saw the release of a definitive three-disc Webster compilation project on Defected Records, followed in 2008 by a Coast 2 Coast compilation for NRK Records and Strictly Rhythms Vol. 4.

2013 saw the release of two albums from Webster — a retrospective compilation on Defected called House Masters: Charles Webster, and a modern big band jazz album with Pete Wraight (as the Wraight-Webster Ensemble), No Lucky Days.

== Discography ==
=== Albums ===
- 1999 All Systems Gone as 'Presence'
- 2001 Born on the 24th of July as Charles Webster
- 2003 Remixed on the 24th of July as Charles Webster
- 2013 No Lucky Days (with Peter Wraight) as 'Webster Wraight Ensemble'
- 2020 Decision Time as Charles Webster

=== Compilations ===
- 2005 "What's Phat Pussy Cat 4" on CCP Record Company
- 2007 "Defected Presents Charles Webster" on Defected Records
- 2008 "Coast 2 Coast" on NRK Records
- 2010 "Strictly Rhythms Vol. 4" on Strictly Rhythm
- 2010 "Pioneers of House: Charles Webster" on Soul Candi
- 2011 "Studio Soul" on Do It Now Recordings
- 2013 "House Masters Charles Webster" on Defected Records

=== Singles ===
Charles Webster

- 1996 "Random House Vol. 1" (with Paul K. Joyce)
- 2000 "Your Life" (with Mark Sheridan and Sara Jay)
- 2001 "I Understand You" (with Delroy St. Joseph)
- 2002 "It's Not What It Was"
- 2002 "Ready" (with Terra Deva)
- 2011 "I Am The Sun" (with Cathy Battistessa)
- 2011 "Fight For Freedom" (with Thandi Draai)
- 2012 "Be Yourself" (with Diviniti)
- 2012 "Lonely" (with Diviniti)
- 2012 "Learning to Love Me" (with Diviniti)
- 2012 "Give Me More" (with Shana Halligan)
- 2012 "Our Jewel" (with January Tuesday)
- 2014 "Searching for my life" (Siya aka Solo)

Presence

- 1995 "My Baby"
- 1996 "The Spectrum EP"
- 1996 "The Strength"
- 1996 "Unreleased Stuff Vol. 1/2"
- 1997 "Better Day" (with Steve Edwards)
- 1997 "Remixes"
- 1998 "White Powder EP"
- 1998 "Sense of Danger" (with Shara Nelson)
- 1999 "Future Love" (with Steve Edwards)

Furry Phreaks

- 1994 "Gonna Find a Way"
- 1995 "Want Me Like Water" (with Terra Deva)
- 1996 "Soothe" (with Terra Deva)
- 1997 "Remixes"
- 2001 "Want Me Like Water 2001" (with Terra Deva)
- 2005 "Mixed Messages EP"
- 2007 "All Over the World" (with Terra Deva)

DJ Profile

- 1997 "The EP"
- 1998 "Prove It"
- 1998 "Unreleased Stuff Vol. 3/4"
- 2000 "Simpletone EP"

Sine

- 1992 "Deep Anxiety EP" (with Sara Jay)
- 1992 "I Like It Deep"
- 1993 "Round and Round" (with Sara Jay)

Hot Lizard
All with Gary Marsden and Paul Wain

- 1995 "The Theme"
- 1996 "Big Air"
- 1996 "165... Drop"
- 1998 "Tokyo Traffic"

Symetrics
All with Andrew Hulme and Roger Horberry

- 1993 "Anyway"
- 1993 "Drop EP"
- 1996 "EP 01"
- 1997 "Life Goes On"

Other aliases

- 1992 "Belgium", as Megatonk
- 1992 "Disco Heave", as Smooch
- 1992 "Demonise", as Yukon
- 1993 "We Can Work It Out", as Good Together
- 1993 "Don't Stop", as Unique
- 1994 "I'll Hear Your Body", as Positive
- 1994 "Keep to the Beat", as The Boy
- 1994 "Keep Rockin", as Love From San Francisco
- 1994 "Switch", as Natural
- 1994 "Happy Trax EP", as Together Trax
- 1995 "Sidetracked", as Mendocino
- 1996 "The Florida Fantasy EP", as Love From San Francisco
- 1996 "You Make Me Feel", as City of Angels
- 1997 "Instant Coco", as Taster's Choice (with Ron Trent)
- 1998 "Boxed", as Starpeace
- 1999 "For the Music", as Colourful Karma (with Terra Deva)
- 1999 "Kinda Kickin'", as DJ Boom (with Matthew Herbert)
- 2002 "21st Century Blues", as lo:rise (with Mark Sheridan and Sara Jay)
- 2003 "For the Music (Remixes)", as Colourful Karma (with Terra Deva)
- 2005 "Life Goes On", as lo:rise (with Sara Jay)
- 2008 "The Brighter Side", as Version (with Martin Iveson)
