= Good Intentions (EP) =

EP by Groove Corporation feat. Shara Nelson
- Released: 1996
- Label: Medicine Records

Shara Nelson singles chronology
I Fell (So You Could Catch Me) (1996)	Good Intentions (1996)	Sense of Danger (1998)
- Shara Nelson meets G/Corp - Good Intentions (1996)

"Good Intentions" is a song by Groove Corporation (G/Corp) with vocals by Shara Nelson released as an EP/Single in 1996 on Medicine Records.

== Track listing ==
=== UK EP/CD Single ===
1. Good Intentions (Edit) 3:50
2. Good Intentions (Extended Mix) 5:10
3. Faraway Places 5:14
4. Return of the Skunk Unlimited Orchestra 3:29
