= Forgive Me (Lynden David Hall song) =

2000 song by Lynden David Hall

Single by Lynden David Hall

from the album The Other Side
- Released: 28 February 2000

Lynden David Hall singles chronology
"Medicine 4 My Pain" (1999)	"Forgive Me" (2000)	"Sleeping with Victor" (2000)

"Forgive Me" is a song by English singer Lynden David Hall. It was released on 28 January 2000 as the lead single from his second studio album The Other Side and reached number 30 on the UK Singles Chart. It was also featured on the soundtrack of the film Goodbye Charlie Bright (2001).
