= Inside Out (Shara Nelson song) =

1993 single by Shara Nelson

Single by Shara Nelson

from the album What Silence Knows
- Released: 8 November 1993
- Length: 3:19
- Label: Cooltempo
- Songwriters: Shara Nelson; Kevin Armstrong
- Producer: Michael Peden

Shara Nelson singles chronology
| "One Goodbye in Ten" (1993) | "Inside Out" (1993) | "Uptight" (1994) |
| "Nobody" (1994) | "Inside Out" / "Down That Road" (1994) | "Rough with the Smooth" (1995) |

Alternative cover
- 1994 CD single Part 2

Shara Nelson - Inside Out (1993)

"Inside Out" is a song by British singer and songwriter Shara Nelson, released in November 1993 on Cooltempo Records as the third single from her first solo album, What Silence Knows (1993). In August 1994, it was re-released as part of a remix single with "Down That Road". The song, which was co-written by Nelson, peaked at number 34 on the UK Singles Chart and number ten on the UK Dance Singles Chart. A music video was also produced to promote the single.

== Critical reception ==
In his weekly UK chart commentary, James Masterton wrote, "Easily the most outstanding track from her album, "Inside Out" goes back to basics featuring just her voice accompanied by a pedal steel guitar, both swathed in echo as if playing in an empty hall. The result is the most heartbreakingly beautiful record you are likely to hear all year and tragically this may be as far as it gets." Upon the re-release of the single, a reviewer from Music & Media said, "A re-release, so here's a re-run of our view: upside down, inside out, backwards, whatever; as long as you play this "electricoustic" soul ballad you stay on the right side of programming."

Andy Beevers from Music Week gave it four out of five and named it "one of the classiest tracks" on the album. He noted that it has been remixed for the single by Frankie Knuckles, "who has fleshed out the sparse production of the original to create a lush downtempo soul shuffler". Beevers concluded that "it should make hit number three." Nilou Panahpour from Rolling Stones said that the song, "on which Nelson is accompanied by a spare solo guitar, is the record's most moving track because of its starkness." Adam Higginbotham from Select named it a "eerily sparse guitar-vocal". Jonathan Bernstein from Spin felt that "all embellishments are jettisoned for the voice-and-guitar [track]".

== Track listings ==
- UK CD single
1. "Inside Out" (Album Mix) 3:24
2. "Inside Out" (Rhythm Vocal Mix) 3:36
3. "Inside Out" (Classic Club Mix) 7:04
4. "Inside Out" (Underdog Mix) 6:08
- UK CD1 (1994 remix)
1. "Inside Out" (Album Mix) 3:28
2. "Inside Out" (Orchestral Version) 4:16
3. "Down That Road" (Def Classic Mix) 7:14
4. "Inside Out" (Rhythm Vocal Version) 3:36
- UK CD2 (1994 remix)
1. "Inside Out" (Frankie Knuckles Classic Mix) 6:42
2. "Down That Road" (Morales Edit) 3:36
3. "One Goodbye in Ten" (7" Edit) 4:11
4. "Uptight" (Delta House Of Funk Reconstruction) 5:59

== Charts ==
| Chart (1993–1994) | Peak position |
|---|---|
| Scotland (OCC) | 46 |
| UK Singles (OCC) | 34 |
| UK Airplay (ERA) | 93 |
| UK Dance (OCC) | 10 |
| UK Club Chart (Music Week) | 51 |

== Release history ==
| Region | Version | Date | Format(s) | Label(s) | Ref. |
|---|---|---|---|---|---|
| United Kingdom | Original version | 8 November 1993 | 7-inch vinyl; 12-inch vinyl; CD; cassette | Cooltempo | |
| Australia | Original version | 7 March 1994 | CD; cassette | Cooltempo | |
| United Kingdom | Remix with "Down That Road" | 30 August 1994 | 12-inch vinyl; CD; cassette | Cooltempo | |
