= In Between Jobs =

Studio album by Lynden David Hall
- Released: 25 April 2005
- Genres: R&B, neo-soul
- Length: 44:18
- Label: Random

Lynden David Hall chronology
The Other Side (2000)	In Between Jobs (2005)

Singles from In Between Jobs
- 1. "Day Off" / "Stay Faithful" Released: 11 April 2005

In Between Jobs is the third and final album by British R&B singer Lynden David Hall, released in April 2005 on the Random label. The album peaked at No. 188 on the UK Albums Chart. It was the last album Hall released prior to his death in February 2006. It was re-released on 15 July 2013, including a previously unreleased bonus track entitled "Promise".

== Track listing ==
=== Original 2005 release ===
All tracks composed by Lynden David Hall.

1. "Don't Hide Your Heart" – 3:32
2. "Stay Faithful" – 4:32
3. "In Between Jobs" – 3:56
4. "Pimps, Playas and Hustlers" – 4:53
5. "Day Off" – 3:57
6. "Still Here with You" – 4:53
7. "Eventually" (feat. Me One) – 4:03
8. "Memories and Souvenirs" – 3:48
9. "(If You Ain't) Comfortable" – 4:36
10. "Blessings" – 6:08

=== 2013 re-release ===
All tracks composed by Lynden David Hall.

1. "Don't Hide Your Heart" – 3:32
2. "Stay Faithful" – 4:32
3. "In Between Jobs" – 3:56
4. "Pimps, Playas and Hustlers" – 4:53
5. "Day Off" – 3:57
6. "Still Here with You" – 4:53
7. "Eventually" (feat. Me One) – 4:03
8. "Memories and Souvenirs" – 3:48
9. "(If You Ain't) Comfortable" – 4:36
10. "Blessings" – 6:08
11. "Promise" – 4:41
