= Blue Lines =

Studio album by Massive Attack
- Released: 8 April 1991
- Recorded: 1990–1991
- Studios: Coach House (Bristol); Eastcote (London); Cherry Bear; Abbey Road (London); Hot Nights (London)
- Genre: Trip hop
- Length: 45:08
- Labels: Wild Bunch; Virgin
- Producers: Massive Attack; Jonny Dollar

Massive Attack chronology
Blue Lines (1991)	Protection (1994)

Singles from Blue Lines
- 1. "Daydreaming" Released: 15 October 1990; 2. "Unfinished Sympathy" Released: 11 February 1991; 3. "Safe from Harm" Released: 27 May 1991; 4. "Hymn of the Big Wheel" / "Be Thankful for What You've Got" Released: 10 February 1992

Blue Lines is the debut studio album by English electronic music group Massive Attack, (Note: On certain releases, the group is credited as "Massive".) released on 8 April 1991 by Wild Bunch and Virgin Records. The recording was led by members Grantley "Daddy G" Marshall, Robert "3D" Del Naja, Adrian "Tricky" Thaws, and Andrew "Mushroom" Vowles, with co-writing and co-production by Jonny Dollar. It also features contributions by singers Shara Nelson and Horace Andy. Generally regarded as the first "trip hop" album, Blue Lines blended elements of hip-hop (such as breakbeats, sampling, and rapping) with dub, soul, reggae, and electronic music.

Blue Lines was named the 21st greatest album of all time in a 1997 "Music of the Millennium" poll conducted by HMV, Channel 4, The Guardian and Classic FM. In 2000, Q readers placed it at number 9 in the magazine's poll of the "100 Greatest British Albums Ever". In 2003, the album was included on Rolling Stone's list of "The 500 Greatest Albums of All Time" and again in 2012 and 2020. Pitchfork ranked it at number 85 in its list of "The Top 100 Albums of the 1990s".

A remastered version of the album was released on 19 November 2012.

== Background ==
"We worked on Blue Lines for about eight months, with breaks for Christmas and the World Cup," said Robert "3D" Del Naja, "but we started out with a selection of ideas that were up to seven years old. Songs like 'Safe from Harm' and 'Lately' had been around for a while, from when we were The Wild Bunch, or from our time on the sound systems in Bristol. But the more we worked on them, the more we began to conceive new ideas too – like, 'Five Man Army' came together as a jam." The group also drew inspiration from concept albums in various genres by artists such as Pink Floyd, Public Image Ltd, Billy Cobham, Wally Badarou, Herbie Hancock and Isaac Hayes.

Daddy G said about the making of the album:

We were lazy Bristol twats. It was Neneh Cherry who kicked our arses and got us in the studio. We recorded a lot at her house, in her baby's room. It stank for months and eventually we found a dirty nappy behind a radiator. I was still DJing, but what we were trying to do was create dance music for the head, rather than the feet. I think it's our freshest album, we were at our strongest then.

The font used on the cover of the album is Helvetica Black Oblique. Del Naja has acknowledged the influence of the inflammable material logo used on the cover of Stiff Little Fingers' album Inflammable Material.

== Composition ==
Blue Lines is generally considered the first trip hop album, although the term was not widely used before 1994. A fusion of electronic music, hip-hop, dub, 1970s soul and reggae, it established Massive Attack as one of the most innovative British bands of the 1990s and the founder of trip hop's Bristol sound. AllMusic's John Bush also affirmed the album as the "first masterpiece" of what later became known as trip hop, and described it as "filter[ing] American hip-hop through the lens of British club culture, a stylish, nocturnal sense of scene that encompassed music from rare groove to dub to dance." The album featured breakbeats, sampling, and rapping on a number of tracks, but the design of the album differed from traditional hip-hop. Music critic Simon Reynolds stated that the album also marked a change in electronic and dance music, "a shift toward a more interior, meditational sound. The songs on Blue Lines run at 'spliff' tempos – from a mellow, moonwalking 90 beats per minute ... down to a positively torpid 67 bpm."

== Reception ==
Professional ratings
Review scores
Source	Rating
AllMusic	5/5 stars
The A.V. Club	A
The Guardian	5/5 stars
Mojo	5/5 stars
NME	10/10
Pitchfork	9.0/10
Q	4/5 stars
The Rolling Stone Album Guide	5/5 stars
Select	5/5
Uncut	9/10

In a contemporary review of Blue Lines for NME, Dele Fadele described the album as "the sleekest, deadliest, most urbane, most confounding LP 1991 has yet seen", writing that Massive Attack "put current changes on the dancefloor in perspective and map out blueprints for what must surely come next" and that "after Blue Lines the boundaries separating soul, funk, reggae, house, classical, hip-hop and space-rock will be blurred forever." Select's Andrew Harrison similarly complimented the album's diverse mix of styles and called it "a record to transcend every boundary", while in Melody Maker, Jim Irvin praised it as an album that "one hopes might just bring down forever the wall of snobbery that still exists between dance and all other music." Robert Christgau was more reserved in his praise, giving the album a three-star honourable mention and writing, "from soul ii skank, those postindustrial blues got them down". At the Brit Awards' 1992 ceremony, Blue Lines was nominated for Best British Album.

The album reached number 13 on the UK Albums Chart; sales were limited elsewhere. Blue Lines proved to be popular in the club scene, as well as on college radio stations.

According to Greg Kot in the 2004 Rolling Stone Album Guide, Blue Lines became "the blueprint" for trip hop, which would later emerge as a commercially popular musical style. "On its release, Blue Lines felt like nothing else", Alexis Petridis wrote for The Guardian upon the album's 2012 reissue, adding that it "still sounds unique, which is remarkable given how omnipresent trip-hop was to become". Michael Gallucci of The A.V. Club noted that the album "created a template trip-hop artists relied on extensively" in the years following its release. Pitchfork's Miles Raymer, meanwhile, identified Blue Lines as "at its heart ... a hip-hop record", crediting it with being "at the forefront" of the genre's musical progression from "blocky rhythms and minimal arrangements" in the 1980s towards "deep, organic textures" in the 1990s. Concluding his review for AllMusic, John Bush deemed Blue Lines "one of the best dance albums of all time."

In 1997, Blue Lines was named the 21st greatest album of all time in a "Music of the Millennium" poll conducted by HMV, Channel 4, The Guardian and Classic FM. The following year, Q readers placed it at number 58 in its list of the "100 Greatest Albums Ever", and in 2000, the album was voted at number 9 in the magazine's poll of the "100 Greatest British Albums Ever". In 2003, the album was ranked number 395 on Rolling Stone's list of "The 500 Greatest Albums of All Time", 397 in a 2012 revised list, and 241 in a 2020 revised list. Pitchfork ranked it at number 85 in its 2003 list of "The Top 100 Albums of the 1990s". The album was also included in the book 1001 Albums You Must Hear Before You Die. The track "Unfinished Sympathy" has also been singled out for praise, being hailed by BBC Radio 2 as "one of the most moving pieces of dance music ever, able to soften hearts and excite minds just as keenly as a ballad by Bacharach or a melody by McCartney."

"This album is chill music for me – music to write to", said author Chuck Palahniuk. "I'm writing short stories to this right now. I put this on repeat, something Andy Warhol used to do: He'd put singles on and play them unendingly to the point where the language would break down, and he would paint to that trancelike repetition."

As of February 2010, the album had sold 266,000 copies in the United States, according to Nielsen SoundScan.

== Track listing ==
No.	Title	Writer(s)	Length
1.	"Safe from Harm"	Grantley Marshall; Andrew Vowles; Robert Del Naja; Shara Nelson; William Cobham	5:18
2.	"One Love"	Marshall; Vowles; Del Naja; Claude Williams; Horace Andy	4:48
3.	"Blue Lines"	Marshall; Vowles; Del Naja; Adrian Thaws	4:21
4.	"Be Thankful for What You've Got"	William DeVaughn	4:09
5.	"Five Man Army"	Marshall; Vowles; Del Naja; Thaws; Claude Williams	6:04
6.	"Unfinished Sympathy"	Marshall; Vowles; Del Naja; Jonathan Sharp; Nelson	5:08
7.	"Daydreaming"	Marshall; Vowles; Del Naja; Wally Badarou; Thaws	4:14
8.	"Lately"	Marshall; Vowles; Del Naja; Nelson; Gus Redmond; Larry Brownlee; Jeffrey Simon; Fred E. Simon	4:26
9.	"Hymn of the Big Wheel"	Marshall; Vowles; Del Naja; Neneh Cherry; Andy	6:36
Total length:			45:08

== Personnel ==
Credits adapted from the liner notes of Blue Lines.

=== Studios ===
- Coach House (Bristol) – recording (tracks 1, 2, 6, 8, 9); mixing (track 8)
- Matrix (London) – mixing (tracks 1, 4–6, 9)
- Konk Studios (London) – mixing (tracks 2, 7)
- Eastcote Studios (London) – recording (tracks 3, 5)
- Cherry Bear Studios – recording (tracks 4, 7)
- Abbey Road Studios (London) – recording (track 6)
- Roundhouse (London) – mixing (track 7)
- Hot Nights (London) – recording (track 9)
- LOUD Mastering (Taunton) – remixing, remastering (2012 Mix/Master)

=== Musicians ===
- Shara Nelson – vocals (tracks 1, 6–8)
- Horace Andy – vocals (tracks 2, 5, 9)
- 3D – vocals (tracks 1, 3, 5, 7)
- Tricky – vocals (tracks 3, 5, 7)
- Daddy G – vocals (tracks 3, 5, 7)
- Tony Bryan – vocals (track 4)
- Paul Johnson – bass guitar (track 3)
- Jonny Dollar – songwriting, string composition (track 6)
- Wil Malone – string arrangement, conducting (track 6)
- Gavyn Wright – leader (track 6)
- Neneh Cherry – additional arrangement (track 9)
- Mikey General – backing vocal (track 9)

=== Technical ===
- Massive Attack – production, mixing
- Jonny Dollar – production, mixing
- Cameron McVey (Booga Bear) – executive production
- Jeremy Allom – mix engineering (tracks 1, 3–7, 9)
- Bryan Chuck New – mix engineering (tracks 2, 8)
- Kevin Petri – engineering (tracks 3, 5)
- Haydn – string engineering (track 6)
- John Dent – remastering (2012 mix/master)
- Bruno Ellingham – remixing (2012 mix/master)

=== Artwork ===
- Blame: Judy – art
- "3D" Del Naja – art, design
- Michael Nash – art, design
- Jean-Baptiste Mondino – back cover photo
- Eddie Monsoon – single faces

== Charts ==
=== Weekly charts ===
Weekly chart performance for Blue Lines
Chart (1991–2013)	Peak position
Australian Albums (ARIA)	69
Austrian Albums (Ö3 Austria)	5
Belgian Albums (Ultratop Flanders)	81
Belgian Albums (Ultratop Wallonia)	176
Dutch Albums (Album Top 100)	39
European Albums (Music & Media)	24
French Albums (SNEP)	31
Irish Albums (IRMA)	25
German Albums (Offizielle Top 100)	31
New Zealand Albums (RMNZ)	26
Norwegian Albums (VG-lista)	29
Scottish Albums (Official Charts)	28
Swedish Albums (Sverigetopplistan)	14
Swiss Albums (Schweizer Hitparade)	26
UK Albums (Official Charts)	13
UK Dance Albums (Official Charts)	3
UK R&B Albums (Official Charts)	2

=== Year-end charts ===
Year-end chart performance for Blue Lines
Chart (1999)	Position
UK Albums (OCC)	93

== Certifications ==
Certifications for Blue Lines
Region	Certification	Certified units/sales
France (SNEP)	2× Gold	200,000^{*}
United Kingdom (BPI)	3× Platinum	900,000^{‡}
^{*} Sales figures based on certification alone.^{‡} Sales+streaming figures based on certification alone.

== Bibliography ==
- Chemam, Melissa (2019). Massive Attack: Out of the Comfort Zone. Tangent Books. ISBN 978-1-9100-8972-9.
