= Air Cuba =

British electronic music duo

- Origin: United Kingdom
- Genres: Big beat, electronica, electronic rock
- Years active: 1998–2000/1
- Label: 4AD
- Members: Christopher Andrews; Ashley Bates

Cuba feat. Shara Nelson - Black Island (1999)

Air Cuba, previously known as Cuba, were a British electronic music duo formed by Christopher Andrews and Ashley Bates. They released two singles and an album, Leap of Faith, on 4AD in 1998 and 1999. Their sound demonstrated a range of electronic, pop, and rock influences, and they were frequently compared with Primal Scream.

== Background ==
The group was formed as Cuba in 1998 by Christopher Andrews and Ashley Bates, formerly the drummer of Chapterhouse. Originally from Canada, Andrews named the band "Cuba" in honour of his heritage. The group self-financed two singles, "Havana" and "Fiery Cross", which were released by 4AD. The following year they changed their name to Air Cuba and released their only album, Leap of Faith.

Cuba collaborated with Angie Brown of Bizarre Inc, Shara Nelson of Massive Attack, and Mau (alias of Michael Giffts), formerly of Earthling.

== Recordings ==
The group's first single release, "Cross the Line," was called "pretty appealing" in a Times review, which recommended Cuba as "a blistering cure for the summertime blues." Their sole full-length studio album on 4AD, Leap of Faith, was described as an "updated Happy Mondays with the ecstasy-induced excesses" by Chart Magazine.

== Discography ==
=== Albums ===
- Leap of Faith (4AD CAD9014, 13 September 1999)
  1. "Cross the Line" (featuring Mau)
  2. "Devil's Rock"
  3. "Black Island" (featuring Shara Nelson)
  4. "King of Kelty"
  5. "Starshine" (featuring Angie Brown)
  6. "Peak Flow"
  7. "Winter Hill" (featuring Rachel Goswell)
  8. "Havana" (featuring Mau)
  9. "Hail Mary"
  10. "Urban Light"
  11. "Foxy's Den"
  12. "Fiery Cross"

=== Singles ===
- "Urban Light" (4AD TAD8010, 11 May 1998)
  1. "Urban Light" (7:00 PM)
  2. "Urban Light" (12:00 AM)
- "Cross the Line" (4AD BAD8012, 27 July 1998)
  1. "Cross the Line"
  2. "Raise the Alarm"
  3. "Foxy's Den"
- "Havana" (4AD BAD8019, 30 November 1998)
  1. "Havana"
  2. "Leap of Faith"
  3. "Havana" (Daniel Aufbäger Remix)
- "Black Island" (4AD BAD9016, 30 August 1999)
  1. "Black Island"
  2. "Isla Negra"
  3. "Black Island" (Groove Armada's Desert Island Disc)
- "Starshine" (4AD BAD9019, 1 November 1999)
  1. "Starshine" (Edit)
  2. "White Shadow"
  3. "Starshine" (Rae and Christian Remix)
