= Elsiane =

Canadian band

- Genres: Trip hop, downtempo, electro
- Years active: 2000-present
- Label: Nettwerk
- Members: Elsieanne Caplette, Stephane Sotto
- Website: http://www.elsiane.com

Elsiane is a Canadian band composed of Elsieanne Caplette and Stephane Sotto.

== Biography ==
Elsieanne grew up in Peru. She studied classical music and later learned to play the guitar. She became a singer in a group in Peru and then moved to Montreal in 1999, where she met Stephane Sotto.

A self-taught musician, Stephane Sotto was born in Montreal. When Elsieanne and he met, they decided to form the band Elsiane whose name is formed from the first four letters of the first name of the singer and the last three letters of the musician's first name.

The two artists began their collaboration in 2000 and published their first album entitled Hybrid on May 1, 2007, an album mixing jazz, downtempo, rock, classical and electronic music. The album was released a little over a year later in the United States under the label Nettwerk, writes PopMatters, adding that "These trip-hoppers from the USA’s neighbor to the north clearly know how to recreate that mellow, hypnotic atmosphere utilized in the ’90s by big names like Massive Attack, Portishead, etc."

On stage, Elsiane is composed of Jeff Feldman on bass and keyboards, and Philippe Look on guitar and keyboards as well.

During the summer of 2011, Elsiane announced the release of a second album. A few months later, the first single "Underhelped" accompanied by a clip was put online. The album Mechanics of Emotion was released on April 10, 2012.

Because they were struggling with the music industry, their third album Death of the Artist was released independently.

They released their fifth album, with the first single "Sinai" in June 2020.

== Discography ==
- Hybrid (2007, Vega)
- Mechanics of Emotion (2012, Labratoryband Inc.)
- Death of the Artist (2017, Self-released)
- Rin, Tongue and Dorner (2018, Self-released, in collaboration with Rich Shapero)
- Elsiane (2023, Labratoryband Inc.)
