= One Goodbye in Ten =

1993 single by Shara Nelson

Single by Shara Nelson

from the album What Silence Knows
- Released: 6 September 1993
- Genre: Soul
- Length: 4:09
- Label: Cooltempo
- Songwriters: Shara Nelson; Bob Stanley; Pete Wiggs
- Producer: Michael Peden

Shara Nelson singles chronology
"Down That Road" (1993)	"One Goodbye in Ten" (1993)	"Inside Out" (1993)

Audio sample
- file; help

"One Goodbye in Ten" is a song by British singer-songwriter Shara Nelson, released in September 1993 by Cooltempo Records as the second single from the singer's first solo album, What Silence Knows (1993). Written by her with British band Saint Etienne and produced by Michael Peden, the song received critical acclaim and peaked at number 21 on the UK Singles Chart. Additionally, it was a top-30 hit in Austria and a top-50 hit in the Netherlands.

== Background ==
In an interview with Melody Maker, Nelson told about making the song, "I heard what they [Saint Etienne] did to "Only Love Can Break Your Heart" and thought 'Oooh, that's interesting'. I liked the mood they created. I told them I wanted something on a Motown verge and they agreed and did some backing tracks. We got together in a room and that was it. The song came very quickly. The words suddenly popped into my head."

== Critical reception ==
In his weekly UK chart commentary, James Masterton wrote, "Shara Nelson follows up July's No.19 hit 'Down That Road' with a song which is a vast improvement on its predecessor. 'One Goodbye in Ten' shows off her voice to dramatic effect, a ballad in the classic Motown sense, strings and all. If there was any justice this would be a massive hit. Sadly I fear most record buyers will be too insular to appreciate the brilliance of this track." Everett True from Melody Maker named it Single of the Week, saying, "She sings like singing is the purest joy of all. 'One Goodbye in Ten' has one simple, wonderful trick. It sounds like two dozen other Sixties soul stormers, and that is an art not to be sneered at. It brings happiness to my table."

John Harris from NME named it "Big Relief Single of the Week", stating that it "is full of unrequited love, secret glances, and tears on lonely pillows". He added that the song is "every bit as full of quality, profundity and wonder. This, in a rather cutting nutshell, is the best thing Stanley and Wiggs have ever been involved with." Adam Higginbotham from Select praised it as "gorgeous" and "a dream-ticket Saint Etienne-style pastiche of top-form Bacharach & David '60s soul". Gavin Reeve from Smash Hits gave it four out of five, writing, "Once again Shara takes us down that road to a time when singers could actually sing and musical instruments didn't go bleep. A real jeans commercial of a record that holds your hand and whispers "come on, you know you want to". Mellow with a capital mmm..." Jonathan Bernstein from Spin remarked that Bob Stanley and Pete Wiggs from Saint Etienne contribute on the single, describing it as "almost perky" with its "early-60s Doris Troy pop-soul stylings."

== Music video ==
The accompanying music video for "One Goodbye in Ten" was directed by English filmmaker and artist John Maybury and produced by Chiara Menage for Limelight Films. It was released on 6 September 1993 and features moody black-and-white aerial shots of Shara Nelson walking around London.

== Track listings ==
- European CD single (7243 8 80913 2 9)
1. One Goodbye in Ten (album mix) – 4:09
2. One Goodbye in Ten (Simon Law mix) – 5:17
3. One Goodbye in Ten (Funky Ginger club mix) – 6:54
4. One Goodbye in Ten (Underdog mix) – 5:13
- UK CD single (7243 8 80884 2 8)
1. One Goodbye in Ten (album mix) – 4:09
2. One Goodbye in Ten (Simon Law mix) – 5:17
3. One Goodbye in Ten (Funky Ginger club mix) – 6:54
4. One Goodbye in Ten (Original demo) – 5:13
5. One Goodbye in Ten (Underdog mix) – 4:21

== Charts ==
Chart (1993)	Peak position
Australia (ARIA)	200
Austria (Ö3 Austria Top 40)	30
Europe (Eurochart Hot 100)	63
Germany (GfK)	71
Iceland (Íslenski Listinn Topp 40)	25
Israel (Israeli Singles Chart)	26
Netherlands (Dutch Top 40 Tipparade)	14
Netherlands (Single Top 100)	49
UK Singles (Official Charts)	21
UK Airplay (Music Week)	20
UK Dance (Music Week)	8
UK Club Chart (Music Week)	25

== Release history ==
Region	Date	Format(s)	Label(s)	Ref.
United Kingdom	6 September 1993	—N/a	Cooltempo	
Australia	4 October 1993	CD; cassette	Cooltempo	
