= Baggies (trousers) =

1980s UK jean design

"Baggies" was a name given to a particular type of jean in the early 1980s in the United Kingdom. The jeans were designed to be loose fitting around the leg, with a tight zip or button around the ankle, and had a number of zips with pockets primarily down the front of the jean. Typically there may have been ten or more pockets on the front of the jeans. They would frequently been worn with another 1980s fashion accessory, the day-glo sock, which was a terry towelling sock typically coloured in bright yellow, pink, white or light blue.

Before the popular 'baggy clothing' introduced by MC Hammer of the early '90s, there was the dress style Baggies. This style of clothing is best symbolized as dress style clothing. The most fashionable representation of these types of outfits was the pants along with a dress shirt, a thin tie, a fancy blazer coat and dress shoes. The best example of this clothing and outfits were worn by the Minneapolis based band known as "The Time" (headed by frontman Morris Day).
