= All Systems Gone =

Studio album by Presence
- Released: 25 January 1999
- Genre: House
- Length: 62:37
- Label: Pagan
- Producer: Charles Webster

Presence feat. Shara Nelson - Sense Of Danger (1998)

All Systems Gone is a 1999 album by Presence, a project from producer Charles Webster featuring vocalists Shara Nelson and Sara Jay, both of whom had previously worked with Massive Attack, and Steve Edwards, formerly a member of Cloud 9, released on the Pagan label in the UK.

== Recording ==
Webster had recorded under the name Presence since the 1995 single "My Baby" and had a UK hit in 1998 with "Sense of Danger", which reached no. 61 on the UK Singles Chart. This was followed a year later by "Future Love", which peaked at no. 66. Both hit singles were included on the album, along with singles "The Strength" and "Better Day". Unlike much of the genre, the album is very song-based, with Webster explaining "I wanted to make a proper album as opposed to a strict house album. I wanted the songs to have depth and emotion." Nelson said of the collaboration "Charles' songs really stood out from the tracks I tend to receive. They were dance-based, but they had real depth and soul, which is very unusual."

== Reception ==
The album received much critical acclaim with DJ magazine giving it an 11/10 rating, and Allmusic calling it "Probably the first classic record of the 21st century." NME awarded it a 7/10 rating, describing it as "a collection of subtle, soothing, densely-textured compositions". Billboard reviewer Michael Paoletta described it as "beautifully awash in melancholic melodies, soulful vocals, and atmospheric landscapes".

== Track listing ==
No.	Title	Length
1.	"Future Love" (vocals by Steve Edwards)	6:19
2.	"This Is You" (vocals by Sara Jay)	5:49
3.	"Been 2 Long" (vocals by Steve Edwards)	7:58
4.	"Matter Of Fact" (vocals by Shara Nelson)	5:22
5.	"Your Spirit" (vocals by Steve Edwards)	4:58
6.	"Keeping Count"	6:03
7.	"Sense Of Danger" (vocals by Shara Nelson)	7:10
8.	"Favour Nothing"	4:45
9.	"The Strength (Within)" (vocals by Fiona)	4:29
10.	"Better Day" (vocals by Steve Edwards)	5:01
11.	"Far Far Away From My Heart" (vocals by Sara Jay)	4:43
