= Lynden David Hall =

English singer and songwriter (1974–2006)

Background information
- Born: 7 May 1974; Wandsworth, South London, England
- Died: 14 February 2006 (aged 31)
- Occupations: Singer, songwriter, arranger and record producer
- Years active: 1997–2006

Lynden David Hall (7 May 1974 – 14 February 2006) was an English singer, songwriter, arranger, and record producer who emerged during the late 1990s as part of the neo soul movement. In 1999, he was the first UK performer ever voted "Best Male Artist" by the readers of Britain's Blues & Soul magazine. His debut album, Medicine 4 My Pain, spawned the UK hit singles "Do I Qualify" and "Sexy Cinderella". In October 2003, Hall was diagnosed with Hodgkin's lymphoma; he died on 14 February 2006, aged 31.

== Life and career ==
Born in Wandsworth, South London, England, he won the "best newcomer" accolade at the 1998 MOBO (Music of Black Origin) Awards.

In 1999, he was the first UK performer ever voted "Best Male Artist" by the readers of Britain's Blues & Soul magazine. His debut album, Medicine 4 My Pain, as well as the singles "Do I Qualify" and "Sexy Cinderella", had an instant appeal to soul fans in the UK and elsewhere, but it was not until his work got remixed that he got his major breakthrough.

Hall appeared in the film Love Actually in 2003 as the lead singer of the surprise band that plays the Beatles' "All You Need Is Love" at the wedding of the characters played by Keira Knightley and Chiwetel Ejiofor. Two years later, he released his third studio album, In Between Jobs, on an independent label.

In October 2003, Hall was diagnosed with Hodgkin's lymphoma; he died on 14 February 2006, aged 31, from complications resulting from the stem cell transplant he received in January 2005.

Shortly before he died, while in hospital in November 2005 his wife, Nikkie Hall, achieved their wish to help others suffering by putting on the successful Lynden's Wish concert at London's Jazz Café.

== Discography ==
=== Albums ===
- 1997: Medicine 4 My Pain – UK No. 43
- 2000: The Other Side – UK No. 36
- 2005: In Between Jobs – UK No. 188

=== Singles ===
Year	Title	Chart Positions	Album
Year	Title	UK	Album
1997	"Sexy Cinderella"	45	Medicine 4 My Pain
1997	"Do I Qualify?"	26	Medicine 4 My Pain
1998	"Crescent Moon"	45	Medicine 4 My Pain
1998	"Sexy Cinderella" (C&J Remix)	17	Medicine 4 My Pain
1999	"Medicine 4 My Pain"	–	Medicine 4 My Pain
2000	"Forgive Me"	30	The Other Side
2000	"Sleeping with Victor"	49	The Other Side
2000	"Let's Do It Again"	69	The Other Side
2000	"Lady Day (& John Coltrane)" (Courtney Pine feat. Lynden David Hall)	144	Back in the Day (Courtney Pine)
2005	"Day Off" / "Stay Faithful"	–	In Between Jobs
2010	"Ma Foya" (Michael Olatuja feat. Lynden David Hall)	–	
