= Shara Nelson =

English musician (born 1965)

- Born: 1965 (age 60–61); London, England
- Genres: British soul; downtempo; trip hop
- Occupations: Singer; songwriter
- Years active: 1983–present
- Labels: On-U Sound; Unit 7; Virgin; Cooltempo

Shara Nelson (born 1965) is an English singer and songwriter. She worked with Massive Attack in the early 1990s, and as a solo artist had five UK top 40 hit singles. Her 1993 debut album, What Silence Knows, was shortlisted for the Mercury Music Prize.

== Career ==
=== Early work ===
Nelson's first release was the 1983 single "Aiming at Your Heart", which was credited to Shara Nelson & The Circuit. She then released her debut solo single, "Can't Get Over You", in 1986 under the name "Shara". Nelson released two further solo singles in the 1980s, "Standing Invitation" as Sharon Nelson and "Love's Hit You" as Shara Nelson. In the late 1980s, she began working with the Bristol-based DJ/production team The Wild Bunch, from who a spin-off production team/crew would form, named Massive Attack.

=== 1990s ===
Nelson's first release with Massive Attack was the single "Daydreaming" in 1990. As well as providing vocals, Nelson also co-wrote songs with Massive Attack, including the hit single "Unfinished Sympathy" which was included on the group's debut album, Blue Lines, in 1991. The single peaked at No. 13 on the UK Singles Chart and has been widely critically acclaimed, particularly in polls conducted by MTV2 and NME. A reviewer for the BBC said: "More than a decade after its release it remains one of the most moving pieces of dance music ever, able to soften hearts and excite minds just as keenly as a ballad by Bacharach or a melody by McCartney." In total, Nelson co-wrote and provided vocals on four tracks on the Blue Lines album, including another hit single, "Safe From Harm" (UK No. 25). Nelson recorded another track with Massive Attack entitled "Just A Matter of Time", which was exclusively included in a short film of the same name, by Massive Attack.

In July 1993, Nelson restarted her solo career with the hit single "Down That Road" which peaked at No. 19 on the UK Singles Chart. The single was released on Cooltempo Records and both Paul Oakenfold and Steve Osborne were involved in remixing the track. Nelson's debut album, What Silence Knows, was released in September 1993. Produced and mixed by Mike Peden, it peaked at No.22 on the UK album chart, and was later certified Gold by the BPI for sales in excess of 100,000 copies. Nelson co-wrote all of the songs on the album, which included co-writes with Prince Be of P.M. Dawn, and Saint Etienne. Further singles from the album included "One Goodbye in Ten" (UK No. 21), "Uptight" (UK No. 19) and "Inside Out" (UK No. 34).

The album was shortlisted for the Mercury Prize for Best Album in 1994. Also in 1994, Nelson was nominated for "Best British Female Solo Artist" and "Best British Breakthrough Act" at the Brit Awards.

Nelson's second album, Friendly Fire, again produced by Mike Peden, was released in 1995, and contained the hit "Rough with the Smooth" which peaked at No.30 in the UK. The album was less successful than her previous release, and peaked at No.44 in the UK. She was again nominated for "Best British Female Solo Artist" at the 1996 BRIT Awards.

In 1997, Nelson contributed to Shaken and Stirred: The David Arnold James Bond Project, performing the song "Moonraker" which had originally been sung by Shirley Bassey.

In 1998, Nelson collaborated with Charles Webster's Presence project and released the single "Sense of Danger" which peaked at No. 61 in the UK Singles Chart. The track was included on the Presence album All Systems Gone which was released in early 1999, along with another track with Nelson on vocals entitled "Matter of Fact".

Also in 1999, Nelson collaborated with Air Cuba and released the single "Black Island" on the 4AD label. She also collaborated with the UK artists BLIM and Chris Carter as Kasha on the track "U" which was released as a 12" single.

=== 2000s ===
Futurasound feat. Shara Nelson - Right Now (Original Mix) (2003)

In 2002, Nelson released a track entitled "Realise", which was remixed and included on the mix compilation album 4 Vini: Forever Young. In 2003, Nelson collaborated with Adrian Sherwood on the track "Hari Up Hari", which was released as a 12" single. Sherwood was the founder of On-U Sound Records which released Nelson's first record 20 years earlier. Also in 2003, Nelson collaborated with Futurasound on the track "Right Now".

In 2004, Nelson released her first solo single since 1996, the song "Nobody Else". Other tracks released around this time were "Push Me Away" with 10th Planet and "Say My Name" with Little Axe. In December 2007, Nelson was featured on a new single by NUfrequency entitled "Go That Deep", which included a remix by Charles Webster. Doug Wimbish released an album CinemaSonics on Yellowbird in 2008, where Nelson contributed on a song "I Wanna Know" as a co-writer and a vocalist.

=== 2010s ===
NUfrequency feat. Shara Nelson - Go That Deep (2008)

In 2011, DJ Pete Tong filed a restraining order against Nelson. She was found guilty of harassing Tong with nuisance calls, falsely claiming she had married him. She was given a 12-month community order and 80 hours of community service.

Several new tracks have been posted on Nelson's official website, including "Promise to You", "Different" and "If". In February 2012, NUFrequency released their debut album Connected, which includes a new extended version of "Go That Deep" featuring Shara Nelson. A newly remixed and remastered version of Massive Attack's Blue Lines was released in 2012. The album features Nelson on four songs, including the classics "Unfinished Sympathy" and "Safe From Harm". In September 2012, Nelson performed live for the first time in many years, sparking further rumours of an imminent comeback in 2013. She performed her hit "Unfinished Sympathy" (originally with Massive Attack) at the concert in aid of Cool Earth produced by Angelica Campion-Armstrong.

Nelson contributed vocals to the track "Badger Swagger" by The Artful Badger in May 2013. The song was made in support of Team Badger and the "Stop The Cull" petition and was released in June 2013.

Summer 2014 brought the release of a new single called "Promised", again in collaboration with NUfrequency. It was recorded in 2010 and released on Rebirth as a limited hand-stamped white label coloured 10" vinyl. In December 2014, Nelson contributed to "The Peace Collective" with her vocals appearing on the charity single "All Together Now". Other contributors include David Gray and Holly Johnson.

Nelson, Britton and John Power wrote and recorded the title track, "Looking", for the film Anti-Social. Nelson released a single on 27 April 2018 called "Looking (Meghan Markle's Theme)".

=== 2020s ===
Nelson is the featured vocalist on Charles Webster's single "This Is Real", released in October 2020. Nelson and Webster had collaborated before on the Presence album and NUFrequency remixes. In 2022 a remix of the track – "This Is Real (Dazzle Drums Mix)" – was released on vinyl and digital release.

== Discography ==
Studio albums

- 1991: Blue Lines with Massive Attack
- 1993: What Silence Knows (UK No. 22)
- 1995: Friendly Fire (UK No. 44)
- 1999: All Systems Gone (with Charles Webster's Presence)

Collaborations and rare

- 1983: "Aiming at Your Heart"/"Just as Long as We Have Love" (with The Circuit)
- 1984: "Savanna Prance" (with The Missing Brazilians), "In Another World" (with Voice of Authority)
- 1985: "Love's Hit You" (vinyl-only solo single)
- 1985: "Love Mystery" (with Jah Wobble)
- 1986: "Can't Get Over You" (single as Shara)
- 1986: "Standing Invitation" (single as Sharon Nelson)
- 1989: "Je T'aime" (with Dub Syndicate)
- 1991: "Safe from Harm"/"Unfinished Sympathy"/"Lately"/"Daydreaming" (with Massive Attack)
- 1994: "On the Shore" (with Saint Etienne), "Heart of Stone"/"Welcome to the Suburbs" (with Dave Stewart)
- 1995: "Nobody Knows" (with Guru)
- 1996: "Good Intentions"/"Faraway Places" (with Groove Corporation)
- 1998: "Moonraker" (with David Arnold)
- 1999: "Sense of Danger"/"Matter of Fact" (with Presence), "Black Island" (with Cuba), "U" (with Kasha)
- 2001: "If", "Promise to You", "Different" (free downloads of unreleased tracks on official website)
- 2002: "Be My Lighthouse" (with Bim Sherman), "Realise" (with Jason Sparkes)
- 2003: "Right Now" (with Futurasound), "Hari Up Hari" (with Adrian Sherwood)
- 2004: "Nobody Else" (vinyl-only single), "Say My Name" (with Little Axe)
- 2007: "Push Me Away" (with 10th Planet)
- 2008: "Go That Deep" (with NUfrequency), "I Wanna Know" (with Doug Wimbish)
- 2013: "Badger Swagger" (with The Artful Badger)
- 2014: "Promised" (with NUfrequency), "All Together Now" (with The Peace Collective)
- 2015: "Looking" (from the film "Anti-Social" OST)
- 2018: "Looking (Megan Markle's Theme)" solo single, digital release
- 2020: "This Is Real" (with Charles Webster)
- 2022: “This Is Real” Dazzle Drums Mix (with Charles Webster)
- 2023: “This Is Real” Original Demo Mix (with Charles Webster)

== Awards and nominations ==
- 1994: Nominated for Mercury Music Prize (Best Album – What Silence Knows)
- 1994: Nominated for BRIT Award ("Best British Female Solo Artist" and "Best British Breakthrough Act")
- 1996: Nominated for BRIT Award ("Best British Female Solo Artist")
