= The Wild Bunch (sound system) =

English sound system

The Wild Bunch were an English sound system and loose collective of musicians and DJs based in the St Paul's, Montpelier and Bishopston districts of Bristol, England, named after Sam Peckinpah's 1969 Western film.

== History ==
The group started to perform in 1982 as a sound system on the Bristol scene, with Grantley Marshall (aka Daddy G) and Miles Johnson (also known as DJ Milo) as the main two DJs. In 1984, they invited the young graffiti artist Robert Del Naja (aka 3D) to join them, and he soon became one of their MCs, writing lyrics to rap with them. Other rappers joined the collective, such as Claude Williams (aka Willy Wee) and later in 1987 Adrian Thaws (aka Tricky). As pioneers of sound system culture they played all-nighters, clubs and abandoned warehouses. In 1986, they played St Paul's Carnival and signed to 4th & B'way Records on Island Records imprint.

=== Success and disintegration (1985–1989) ===
In 1985, the single Tearin Down The Avenue was recorded and in May 1986 the group toured Japan. After the tour DJ Milo left to work in Japan. The group would perform sound clashes against other sound systems, on New Year's Eve 1987 they clashed with Soul II Soul at St Barnabas crypt, Bristol. In 1988, Friends & Countrymen was released. However, by this time Robert Del Naja, Grant Marshall and Andrew Vowles had formed Massive Attack. By 1989 the group was defunct.

=== Post disbanding (1989–present) ===
DJ Milo, founding Wild Bunch member, is recognised as having created the Bristol sound. Based in NYC, he has lived and worked as DJ Nature for the past three decades and is highly respected in the underground world of house music as a DJ and producer. He also continues to perform and produce as DJ Milo- most recently, at Massive Attack's the seminal August 24 Act 1.5 on the Bristol Downs.

Robert Del Naja, Grant Marshall and Andrew Vowles, continued with Massive Attack and in the early days they often collaborated with Adrian Thaws. However, differences between members saw Thaws leave in 1995, Vowles leave in 1998 and Marshall took a break in 2001. Marshall returned to Massive Attack in 2005. Thaws temporarily returned to Massive Attack in 2016.

Nellee Hooper, who moved to London after the group's dissolution, worked as a producer and remixer for a number of major artists, including Madonna, U2, No Doubt, Garbage, Björk and others. He won the 1995 BRIT Award for Best Producer. He was also a member of Soul II Soul.

Thaws performed with Massive Attack on their first and second full-length releases, Blue Lines and Protection respectively, before pursuing a successful solo career.

Claude Williams provided vocals on Massive Attack's Five Man Army released in 1991. In 2010, he was jailed for a series of robberies, for three years, alongside five other men.

== Musical style ==
The Wild Bunch were pioneers of amalgamating a very wide variety of genres. Their shows mixed disparate styles including elements of hip hop, punk, R&B and reggae. Further, it was their unique focus on slower rhythms and ambient electronic atmospheres that laid the foundations of Bristol sound, which later developed into the popular trip hop genre. They were key members of the Bristol underground scene.

== Members ==
The Wild Bunch is perhaps best known for having been one of the first prominent British DJ and vocalist collaborations:

- Robert Del Naja, a.k.a. 3D (MC)
- Nellee Hooper (DJ)
- Miles Johnson, a.k.a. DJ Milo, (founding member, DJ)
- Grant Marshall, a.k.a. Daddy G (DJ)
- Adrian Thaws a.k.a. Tricky, (part-time member, MC)
- Andrew Vowles, a.k.a. Mushroom (DJ)
- Claude Williams, a.k.a. Willy Wee (MC)

== Influence ==
In 2015, musician James Lavelle put the Wild Bunch's The Look of Love in his top ten British sound system classics that influenced him, calling it "the record that started it all."

The 2016, BBC documentary Unfinished: The Making of Massive Attack featured the story of the Wild Bunch and the Bristol sound.

In 2019, the story of the Wild Bunch was told extensively in the book Massive Attack – Out of the Comfort Zone by journalist Melissa Chemam (chapter 4 and 5).

In 2024, Wild Bunch founder DJ Milo published his autobiography, Stray (Laurie Owens and Milo Johnson, Tangent Press). The genesis of Wild Bunch and the birth of the Bristol sound are told from the inside.
