= Trip hop =

Genre of electronic music

- Stylistic origins: Electronica; hip-hop; downtempo; ambient; psychedelia; soul; dub; breakbeat; funk; R&B; jazz; alternative rock; lounge
- Cultural origins: c. late 1980s – early 1990s, Bristol, England
- Derivative forms: Illbient; IDM

Regional scenes
- United Kingdom; Australia

Other topics
- Bristol sound; experimental hip-hop; psychedelic rap; neo soul; acid jazz; nu jazz; chill-out music

Trip hop is a music genre defined as a psychedelic fusion of hip-hop and electronica with slow tempos and an atmospheric sound. The style emerged as a more experimental variant of breakbeat from the Bristol sound scene of the late 1980s and early 1990s, incorporating influences from jazz, soul, funk, dub, rap, as well as sampling from movie soundtracks and other eclectic sources.

Pioneering trip hop acts include Massive Attack, Tricky, and Portishead. The term was coined in a 1994 Mixmag piece about American producer DJ Shadow. Trip hop achieved commercial success in the 1990s, and has been described as "Europe's alternative choice in the second half of the '90s".

== Characteristics ==
Common musical aesthetics include a bass-heavy drumbeat, often providing the slowed down breakbeat samples similar to standard 1990s hip-hop beats, giving the genre a more psychedelic and mainstream feel. Vocals in trip hop are often female and feature characteristics of various singing styles, including R&B, jazz and rock. The female-dominant vocals of trip hop may be partially attributable to the influence of genres such as jazz and early R&B, in which female vocalists were more common. However, there are notable exceptions: Massive Attack and Groove Armada collaborated with male and female vocalists, Tricky often features vocally in his own productions along with Martina Topley-Bird, and Chris Corner provided vocals for later albums with Sneaker Pimps.

Trip hop is also known for its melancholic sound, due to the fact that several acts of the Bristol scene were inspired by post-punk. Tricky opened his second album Nearly God (1996) with a cover version of "Tattoo", a 1983's "proto-trip-hop" song by Siouxsie and the Banshees released as a b-side of a single. Tricky then covered a pop single of the Cure. Massive Attack also covered and sampled songs of Siouxsie and the Banshees and the Cure in 1997 and 1998 respectively.

Trip hop tracks often incorporate Rhodes pianos, saxophones, trumpets, flutes, and may employ unconventional instruments such as the theremin and Mellotron. Trip hop differs from hip-hop in theme and overall tone. Contrasting with gangsta rap and its hard-hitting lyrics, trip hop offers more aural atmospherics influenced by experimental folk and rock acts of the seventies, such as John Martyn, combined with instrumental hip-hop, turntable scratching, and breakbeat rhythms. Regarded in some ways as a 1990s update of fusion, trip hop may be said to "transcend" the hardcore rap styles and lyrics with atmospheric overtones to create a more mellow tempo.

== History ==
=== Late 1980s–1991: Origins ===
In Bristol, hip-hop began to seep into the consciousness of a subculture already well-schooled in Jamaican forms of music. DJs, MCs, b-boys and graffiti artists grouped together into informal soundsystems. Like the pioneering Bronx crews of DJs Kool Herc, Afrika Bambaataa and Grandmaster Flash, the soundsystems provided party music for public spaces, often in the economically deprived council estates from which some of their members originated. Bristol's soundsystem DJs, drawing heavily on Jamaican dub music, typically used a laid-back, slow and heavy drum beat ("down tempo").

Bristol's Wild Bunch crew became one of the soundsystems to put a local spin on the international phenomenon, helping to birth Bristol's signature sound of trip hop, often termed "the Bristol Sound". The Wild Bunch and its associates included at various times in its existence, DJ Milo (Milo Johnson, aka DJ Nature) founding member of the Wild Bunch and the person generally accepted as the creator of the Bristol sound and therefore, trip hop; MC Adrian "Tricky Kid" Thaws, the graffiti artist and lyricist Robert "3D" Del Naja, producer Jonny Dollar and the DJs Nellee Hooper, Andrew "Mushroom" Vowles and Grant "Daddy G" Marshall. As the hip-hop scene matured in Bristol and musical trends evolved further toward acid jazz and house in the late 1980s, the golden era of the soundsystem began to end. The Wild Bunch signed a record deal and evolved into Massive Attack, a core collective of 3D, Mushroom and Daddy G, with significant contributions from Tricky Kid (soon shortened to Tricky), Dollar, and Hooper on production duties, along with a rotating cast of other vocalists.

Another influence came from Gary Clail's Tackhead soundsystem. Clail often worked with former The Pop Group singer Mark Stewart. The latter experimented with his band Mark Stewart & the Maffia, which consisted of New York session musicians Skip McDonald, Doug Wimbish, and Keith LeBlanc, who had been a part of the house band for the Sugarhill Records record label. Produced by Adrian Sherwood, the music combined hip-hop with experimental rock and dub and sounded like a primitive version of what later became trip hop. In 1993, Kirsty MacColl released "Angel", one of the first examples of the genre crossing over to pop, a hybrid that dominated the charts toward the end of the 1990s.

=== 1991–1997: Mainstream breakthrough ===
"Teardrop"
Sample of "Teardrop" by Massive Attack, from Mezzanine

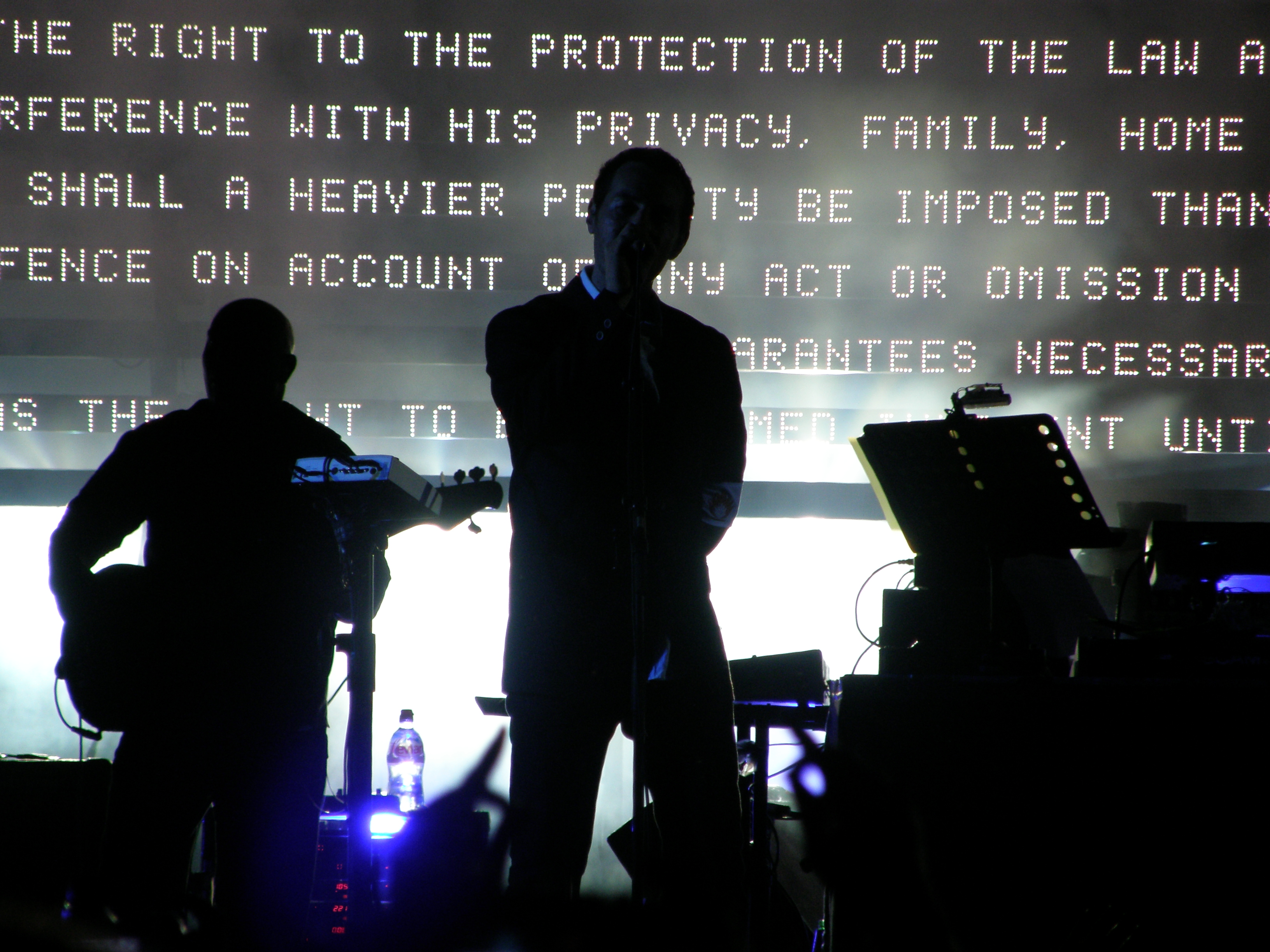
Massive Attack, a British trip hop group that helped bring the genre to mainstream success in the 1990s

Massive Attack's first album Blue Lines was released in 1991 to huge success in the United Kingdom. Blue Lines was seen widely as the first major manifestation of a uniquely British hip-hop movement, but the album's hit single "Unfinished Sympathy" and other tracks were not seen as hip-hop songs in a conventional sense despite similarities in production methods such as using sample-based rhythms. Co-produced by Jonny Dollar, the orchestral "Unfinished" featured R&B singer Shara Nelson, and Jamaican dance hall star Horace Andy provided vocals on several other tracks, as he would throughout Massive Attack's career. Massive Attack released their second album entitled Protection in 1994. Although Tricky stayed on in a lesser role and Hooper again produced, the fertile dance music scene of the early 1990s had informed the record, and it was seen as an even more significant shift away from the Wild Bunch era.

In the June 1994 issue of the UK magazine Mixmag, music journalist Andy Pemberton used the term trip hop to describe the hip-hop instrumental "In/Flux", a 1993 single by San Francisco's DJ Shadow, and other similar tracks released on the Mo' Wax label and being played in London clubs at the time. "In/Flux", with its mixed up beats per minute, spoken word samples, strings, melodies, bizarre noises, prominent bass, and slow beats, gave the listener the impression they were on a musical trip, according to Pemberton. Soon, however, Massive Attack's dubby, jazzy, psychedelic, electronic textures, rooted in hip-hop sampling technique but taking flight into many styles, were described by journalists as the template of the eponymous genre.

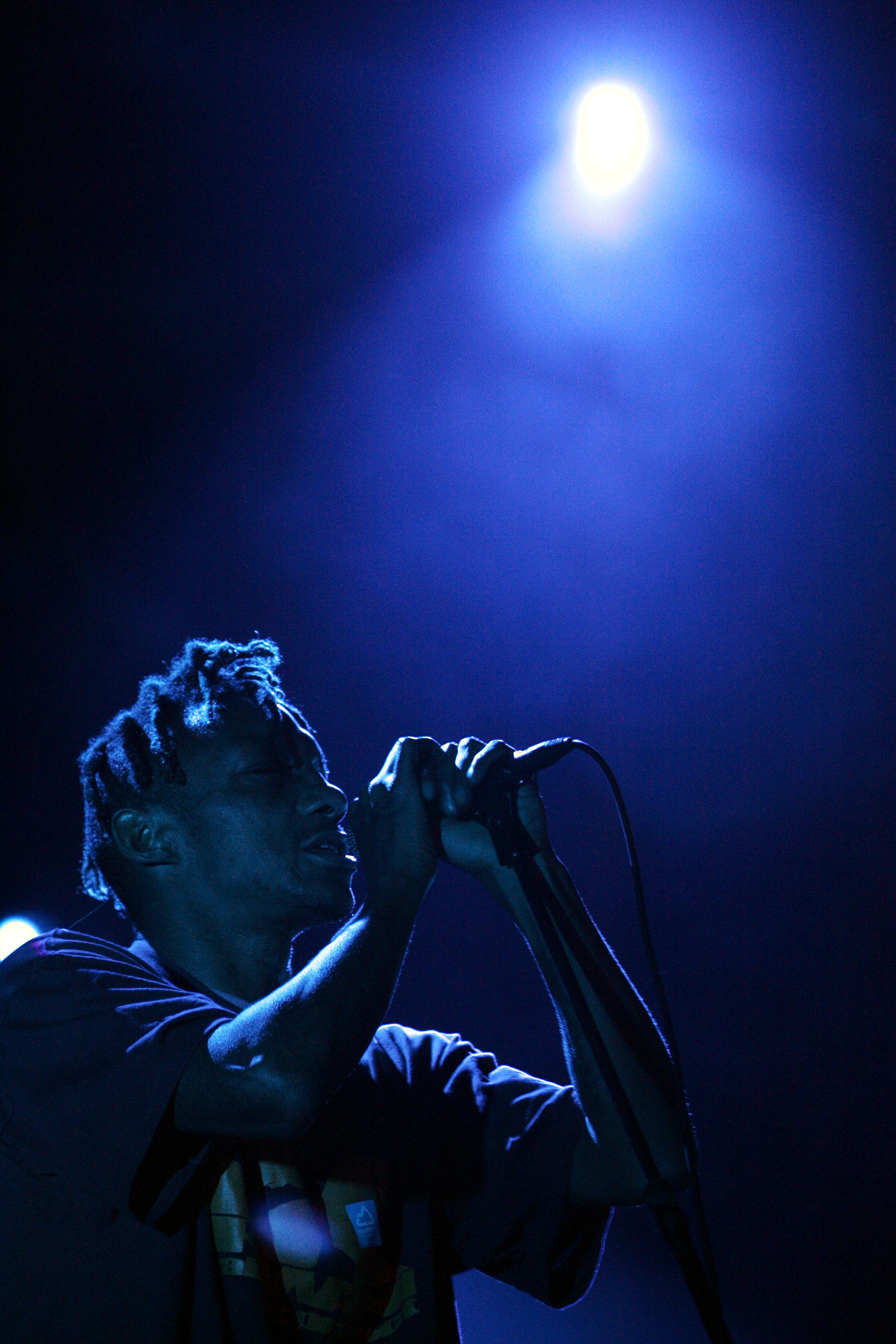
Tricky, a major trip hop artist

In 1993, Icelandic musician Björk released Debut, produced by Wild Bunch member Nellee Hooper. The album, although rooted in four-on-the-floor house music, contained elements of trip hop and is credited as one of the first albums to introduce electronic dance music into mainstream pop. Björk had been in contact with London's underground electronic music scene, and further embraced trip hop with her 1995 album Post by collaborating with Tricky and Howie B. Homogenic, her 1997 album, has been described as a pinnacle of trip hop music.

Trip hop neared the peak of its popularity in 1994 and 1995, with artists such as Howie B and Earthling making significant contributions. Ninja Tune, the independent record label founded by the duo Coldcut, significantly influenced the trip-hop sound in London and beyond with breakthrough artists DJ Food, 9 Lazy 9, Up, Bustle & Out, Funki Porcini and The Herbaliser, among others. The period also marked the debut of two acts who, along with Massive Attack, would define the Bristol scene for years to come.

In 1994, Portishead, a trio comprising singer Beth Gibbons, Geoff Barrow, and Adrian Utley, released their debut album Dummy. Their background differed from Massive Attack in many ways: one of Portishead's primary influences was 1960s and 1970s film soundtrack LPs. Nevertheless, Portishead shared the scratchy, jazz-sample-based aesthetic of early Massive Attack (whom Barrow had briefly worked with during the recording of Blue Lines), and the sullen, fragile vocals of Gibbons also brought them wide acclaim. In 1995, Dummy was awarded the Mercury Music Prize as the best British album of the year, giving trip hop as a genre its greatest exposure yet. Portishead's music was also widely imitated, to the point that they distanced themselves from the trip-hop label they had inadvertently helped popularize, with Barrow stating "The whole trip-hop tag was nonsense. It was developed by people in London, and the people in Bristol just had to put up with it.".

Tricky also released his debut solo album, Maxinquaye in 1995, to great critical acclaim. The album was produced largely in collaboration with Mark Saunders. Tricky employed whispered, often abstract stream-of-consciousness lyrics, remote from the gangsta-rap braggadocio of the mid-1990s US hip-hop scene. Even more unusually, many of the solo songs on Maxinquaye featured little of Tricky's own voice: his then-lover, Martina Topley-Bird, sang them, including her re-imagining of rap group Public Enemy's 1988 song "Black Steel in the Hour of Chaos", while other songs were male-female duets dealing with sex and love in oblique ways, over beds of sometimes dissonant samples. Within a year, Tricky had released two more full-length albums, although they failed to find the same popularity as his Bristol contemporaries Massive Attack and Portishead. Through his collaborations with Björk, however, he exerted influence closer to the pop and alternative rock mainstream, and he developed a large cult fan-base.

Although not as popular in the United States, bands like Portishead and Sneaker Pimps saw moderate airplay on alternative-rock stations across the country.

=== 1997–2010: Continued success and new directions ===
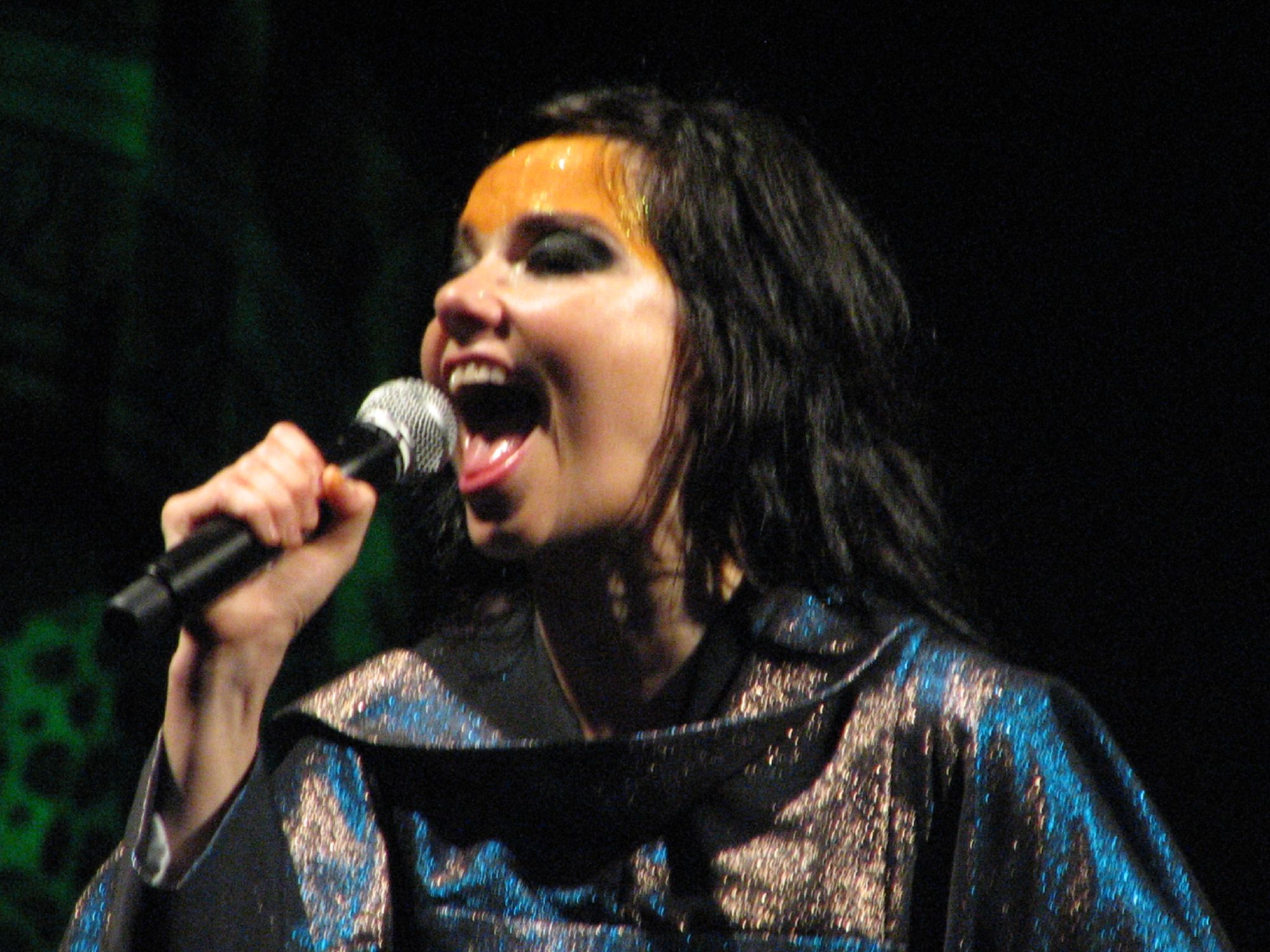
Björk, an artist who has often incorporated trip hop in her music

After the initial success of trip hop in the mid-1990s, the artists who made their own interpretations of the genre include Archive, Baby Fox, Bowery Electric, Esthero, Morcheeba, Everything but the Girl, Sneaker Pimps, Anomie Belle, Alpha, Mudville, Cibo Matto and Lamb. These artists incorporated trip hop into other genres, including ambient, soul, IDM, industrial, dubstep, breakbeat, drum and bass, acid jazz, and new-age. The first printed use of the term "post-trip hop" was in an October 2002 article of The Independent, and was used to describe the band Second Person.

Trip hop has also influenced artists in other genres, including Gorillaz, Emancipator, Nine Inch Nails, Travis, PJ Harvey, How to Destroy Angels, Beth Orton, The Flaming Lips, Bitter:Sweet, Beck, Alanis Morissette, The xx and Deftones. Several tracks on Australian pop singer Kylie Minogue's 1997 album Impossible Princess also displayed a trip hop influence. Various prominent artists and groups, such as Janet Jackson, Kylie Minogue, Madonna, Björk, and Radiohead, have also been influenced by the genre. Trip hop has spawned several subgenres, including illbient (dub-based trip hop which combines ambient and industrial hip-hop).

Some trip-hop artists and albums to come out of this time include the duo I Monster and English virtual band Gorillaz. The latter released their self-titled album in 2001, blending trip-hop with dub and alternative rock. I Monster's 2003 album NeveroddoreveN fuses genres such as electronica and rock in addition to other sounds. It has been used in a number of media forms including the television series Severance and movies such as Flower.

Trip hop continued to influence notable artists in the 2000s. Norwegian avant-garde band Ulver incorporated trip hop along with jazz ans ambient in their album Perdition City. Atmospheric rock band Antimatter included some trip hop elements in their first two albums. Australian composer Rob Dougan proposed a mix of trip hop beats, orchestral music and electronics. RJD2 began his career as a DJ, but in 2001, began releasing albums under El-P's Def Jux Label. Zero 7's album Simple Things, and in particular, its lead single "Destiny", was regarded highly by underground listeners and achieved significant popularity. In 2006, Gotye debuted his second studio album, Like Drawing Blood. The songs on the album featured down-tempo hip-hop beats and dub style bass reminiscent of trip hop. Hip-hop groups Zion I and the Dub Pistols also displayed heavy trip hop influence. Norwegian singer and songwriter Kate Havnevik is a classically trained musician, but also incorporates trip hop into her work.

During the late 1990s and early 2000s trip hop achieved crossover success in the United States, often lumped under the "electronica" label. Trip hop songs were featured in film soundtracks of this era such as the Matrix series. Many producers who were not explicitly trip-hop artists also displayed its influence during this time. Daniel Nakamura, aka Dan the Automator, released two albums that were heavily inspired by trip hop. His 2000 album Deltron 3030 was a concept album about a rapper from the future, portrayed by Del the Funky Homosapien. 2001 saw the release of his side project, Lovage and the album Music to Make Love to Your Old Lady By, with special guests Mike Patton, Prince Paul, Maseo, Damon Albarn, and Afrika Bambaataa. British producer Fatboy Slim's breakthrough album, Halfway Between the Gutter and the Stars, was his most commercially successful release. Another heavily trip-hop influenced band, Elsiane, published their first album Hybrid in 2007, creating a "mellow, hypnotic atmosphere utilized in the '90s by big names like Massive Attack, Portishead, etc."

=== 2010–present ===
Major notable trip hop releases from 2010s include Massive Attack's Heligoland, their first studio album in seven years; and Dutch's A Bright Cold Day in 2010, the latter group including Jedi Mind Tricks producer Stoupe the Enemy of Mankind.

DJ Shadow's The Less You Know, the Better was released in 2011 after a highly publicised unveiling of songs, including appearances on Zane Lowe's BBC Radio 1 show and previews at a performance in Antwerp in August 2010. The album was met with "generally favorable reviews" on Metacritic, with some criticising Shadow's lack of originality. Sam Richards of NME felt that the album sounded "like the work of a man struggling to recall his motivations for making music in the first place."

Beak's album titled Beak>> was released in 2012 and received high scores from journalists, including an 8/10 from NME and Spin magazine.

Lana Del Rey released her second album, Born to Die in 2012, which contained a string of trip hop ballads. The album topped the charts in eleven countries, including Australia, France, Germany, and the United Kingdom; it has sold 3.4 million copies worldwide as of 2013 according to International Federation of the Phonographic Industry.

Following the 2013 release of EP2, the music of FKA Twigs was described in a Pitchfork Magazine article as "trip hop for a new time", with "a menacing undertow reminiscent of Massive Attack's Mezzanine."

In September 2021, the Sneaker Pimps released the album "Squaring the Circle" which had been their first release in over 20 years, featuring Simonne Jones on some of the tracks. The album, while rooted in Trip Hop, had much more of a Pop styling than previous efforts.

In April 2024, Irish rock band Fontaines D.C. released "Starburster", the lead single from their fourth album Romance. Critics Consequence and Clash described the track as trip hop.

In the mid-2020s, the genre saw a resurgence, most notably in the music of FKA Twigs, Addison Rae and Tame Impala. Twigs' third studio album Eusexua and Rae's debut self-titled album saw elements of trip hop in its production, and critics argued that both albums were laced with trip hop influences that resembled Madonna's 1998 studio album Ray of Light.

== See also ==
- Chill-out music
- Acid house
- List of electronic music genres
- List of trip hop artists
