= Cooltempo Records =

British record label

- Status: Active
- Country of origin: UK

Cooltempo, the dance music imprint of Chrysalis Records, was revived in May 2018. The label released albums by artists such as Kenny Thomas, Milli Vanilli, Adeva, Shara Nelson, Mica Paris and Innocence.

== History ==
Cooltempo emerged at the end of the 1980s during the height of the UK acid house scene, signing dance acts such as Monie Love and Adeva. As the dance scene became increasingly fragmented, Cooltempo continued with soul/jazz vocalists such as Juliet Roberts, later branching out with jazz/hip hop artists Guru, Gang Starr, Brand New Heavies and Arrested Development. DJ Trevor Nelson worked with the label from 1993 and signed Lynden David Hall and D'Angelo.

Cooltempo came under the ownership of Blue Raincoat Music as part of their purchase of Chrysalis Records in June 2016.

Cooltempo's first release in nearly 20 years came from DJ and producer Francesca Lombardo with her 'Eye Ring' single followed by her debut album Life of Leaf. The LP merges electronica with musical elements derived from Francesca's classical training. Cooltempo then released the debut album from electronic music mainstays Infinity Ink.

Robin Millar, Chrysalis Blue Raincoat Group Chairman and a successful UK producer with over 160 gold, silver and platinum awards coupled with 44 Number 1 singles to his name released a new album on Cooltempo Records in summer 2020. The record, Meditation From A Desert Island, was initially created for his colleagues during lockdown, to offer them a new soundtrack each week to help with their mental wellbeing. The tracks were so well received that collectively a decision was made to release them officially.

== Discography ==
- Adeva: The 12" Mixes, Adeva, Love Or Lust
- Afrika Bambaataa & Family: The Light
- Carleen Anderson: The Remixes/The Bsides
- D*Note: Lost And Found, Waiting Hopefully
- David Grant & Jaki Graham: The Very Best Of
- Earthling: Radar
- Eternal: The Remixes
- Inner City: Praise, Fire, Paradise Remixed
- Kenny Thomas: Wait For Me
- Loose Ends: A Little Spice
- Luciana: One More River (album), If You Want (digital download & video), Get It Up For Love (digital download & video), One More River (digital download & video)
- GTO: Pure
- Paul Hardcastle: Paul Hardcastle
- Ruthless Rap Assassins: Killer Album
- Various Artists: Cooltempo Sampler
- Damage: Ghetto Romance
- Damage: Rumours
- Damage: Still Be Lovin' You
- Damage: So What If I?
- Jaki Graham: Heaven Knows
- Jaki Graham: Breaking Away
- Juliet Roberts: Natural Thing
- K-Klass: Remixes
- Lynden David Hall: Sexy Cinderella (remixes)
- Paul Hardcastle: No Winners

== See also ==
- Lists of record labels
- List of Cooltempo albums
