= List of UK top-ten singles in 2000 =

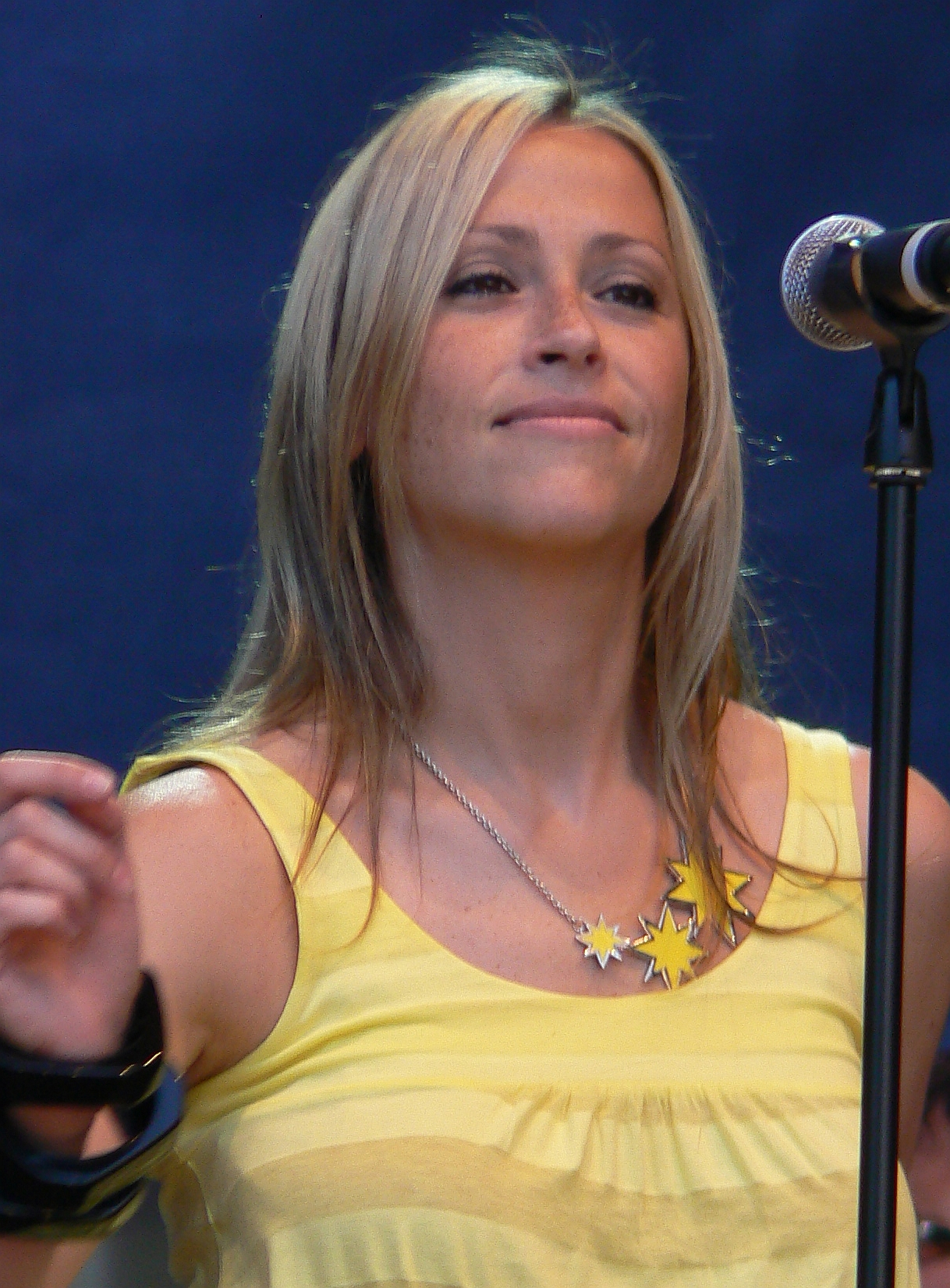
All Saints (group member Nicole Appleton pictured) recorded "Pure Shores" for the soundtrack of the film The Beach, scoring a number-one hit. It ended up as the second best selling single of 2000. The group topped the charts again later in the year with "Black Coffee".

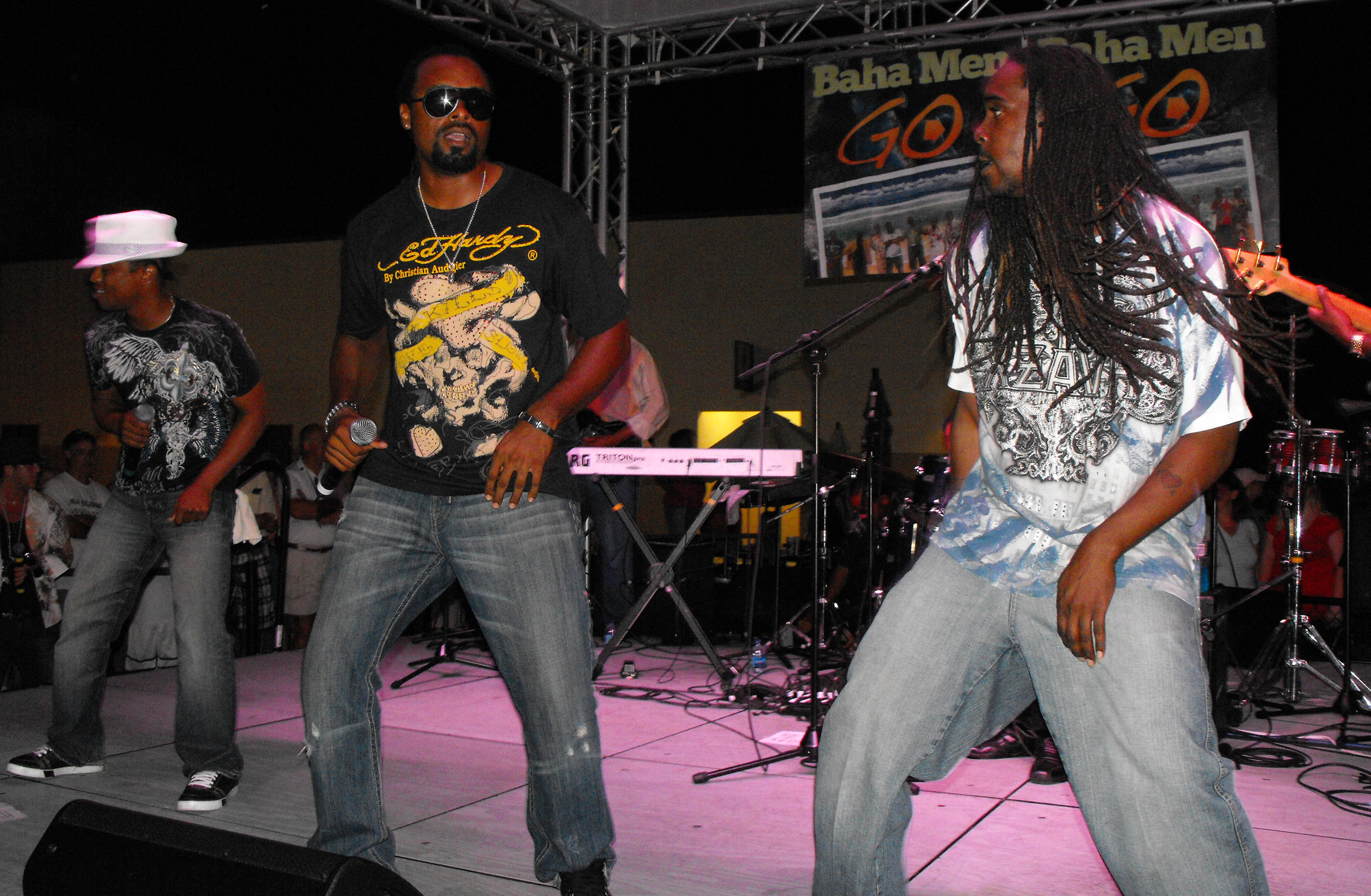
Baha Men spent twelve consecutive weeks in the UK top 10 with their single "Who Let the Dogs Out", which peaked at number two. It went on to become the year's fourth best selling single.

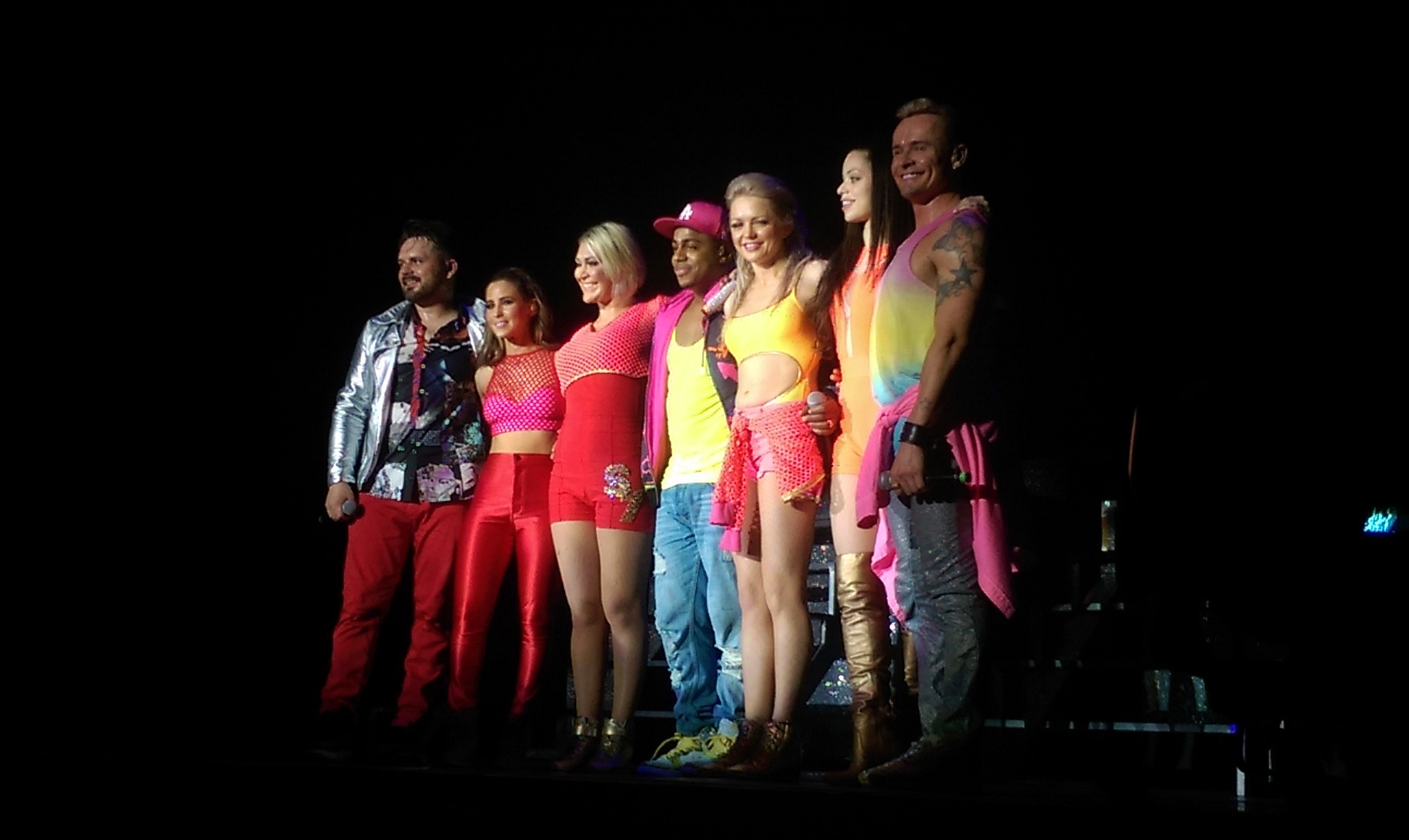
S Club 7 had four top 10 singles in 2000, including the number-one hit "Never Had a Dream Come True", released as the official single for this year's Children in Need.

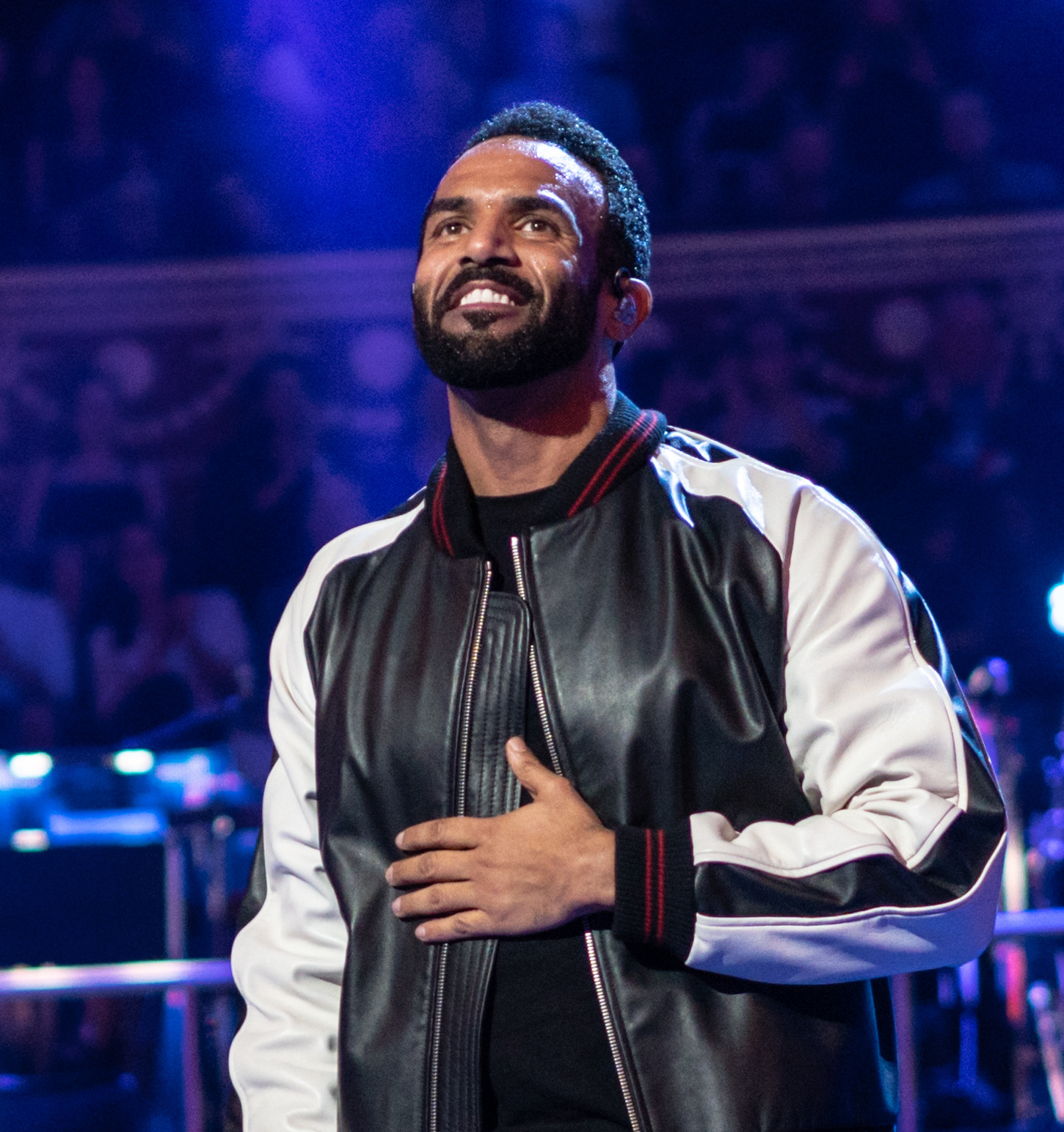
Craig David (pictured in 2018) had a total of five top 10 singles this year, including two number-ones: "Fill Me In" and "7 Days".

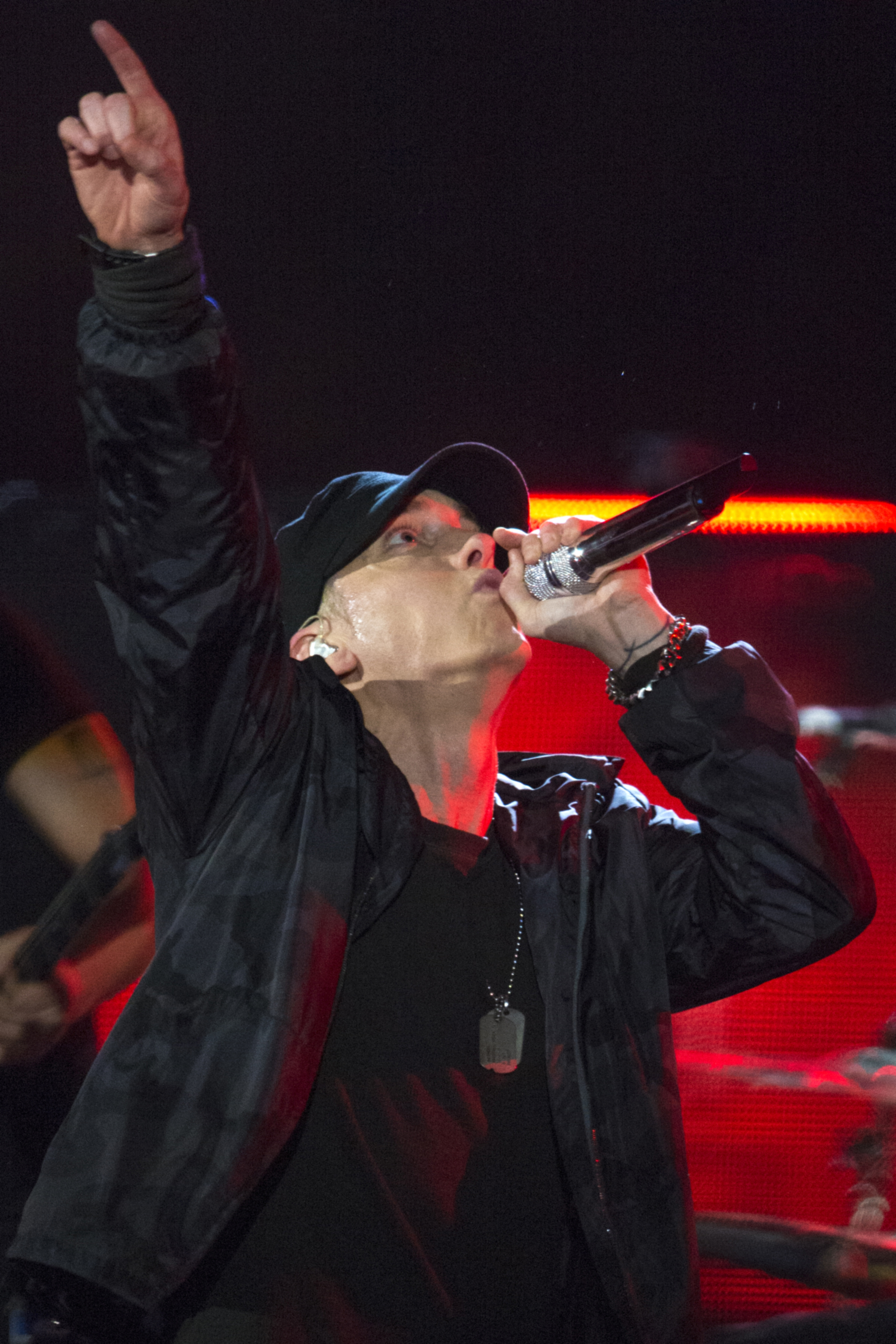
Eminem (pictured in 2014) secured four UK top 10 hits this year, including two number-ones: "The Real Slim Shady" and "Stan".

The UK Singles Chart is one of many music charts compiled by the Official Charts Company that calculates the best-selling singles of the week in the United Kingdom. Before 2004, the chart was only based on the sales of physical singles with airplay figures and digital downloads excluded from the official chart. This list shows singles that peaked in the Top 10 of the UK Singles Chart during 2000, as well as singles which peaked in 1999 but were in the top 10 in 2000. The entry date is when the song appeared in the top 10 for the first time (week ending, as published by the Official Charts Company, which is six days after the chart is announced).

Two hundred and twenty-three singles were in the top ten in 2000. Thirteen singles from 1999 remained in the top 10 for several weeks at the beginning of the year. "Mr. Hankey, the Christmas Poo" by Mr. Hankey, "Two in a Million"/"You're My Number One" by S Club 7 and "Say You'll Be Mine"/"Better the Devil You Know" by Steps were the singles from 1999 to reach their peak in 2000. Forty-nine artists scored multiple entries in the top 10 in 2000. Blink-182, Coldplay, Nelly, Pink and Sia were among the many artists who achieved their first UK charting top 10 single in 2000.

The 1999 Christmas number-one, "I Have a Dream"/"Seasons in the Sun" by Westlife, remained at number-one for the first three weeks of 2000. The first new number-one single of the year was "The Masses Against the Classes" by Welsh band Manic Street Preachers. Overall, forty-three different singles peaked at number-one in 2000, with Westlife (4) having the most singles hit that position.

== Background ==
=== Multiple entries ===
Two hundred and twenty-three singles charted in 2000, with 213 singles reaching their peak this year.

Forty-nine artists scored multiple entries in the top 10 in 2000. British singer-songwriter and rapper Craig David and Irish group Westlife shared the record for the most top ten singles in 2000 with five entries. The most successful of these were "Fill Me In" and 7 Days", which both reached the top of the chart. His other solo single that year, "Walking Away" peaked two places lower at number 3. David had two hit singles in collaboration with Artful Dodger - "Re-Rewind" charted at number 2 in the last weeks of 1999 and remained in the top ten throughout January 2000, while "Woman Trouble" reached a high of number six. Artful Dodger had two further top 10 singles without David, namely the number 2 hit "Movin' Too Fast (with Romina Johnson) and "Please Don't Turn Me On" featuring Lifford, peaking in fourth spot.

Westlife saw all but one of their singles in 2000 reach number-one, beginning with "I Have a Dream"/"Seasons in the Sun", the 1999 Christmas number-one. "Fool Again" repeated the feat in April, and their duet with Mariah Carey - "Against All Odds" - did the same in September. "My Love" became their fourth chart topper of the year in November and "What Makes a Man" peaked one place lower in December 2000.

Britney Spears, Eminem, Kylie Minogue, S Club 7 and Steps also had four hit singles in 2000. Spears had two number-one singles - "Born to Make You Happy and "Oops!... I Did It Again" - among her top ten entries, which were rounded off by "Lucky" (number 5) and "Stronger" (7). Steps took "Stomp" to the top of the charts and also appeared in the top ten with "Say You'll Be Mine"/"Better the Devil You Know" and "Deeper Shade of Blue" (both number four) and "When I Said Goodbye/Summer of Love", which reached number five.

Christina Aguilera achieved two more hit singles in 2000. Among her top ten entries where ”What a Girl Wants”(#3) and "Come On Over Baby (All I Want Is You)" (#8).

Pop group S Club 7's hit singles in 2000 included the chart-topping Children in Need single "Never Had a Dream Come True", number two entries "Reach" and "Two in a Million"/"You're My Number One", and "Natural which peaked one place lower. Rapper Eminem had two number one singles - "The Real Slim Shady" and the duet with Dido, "Stan". He also placed in the top ten with his Dr. Dre collaboration "Forgot About Dre" (number seven) and solo single "The Way I Am" at number eight.

Australian singer Minogue's biggest hit of the year was July's "Spinning Around" which spent a week at the top. Her other entries were "On a Night Like This", missing out on being her second number one of the year by one position, and "Please Stay", a single week in tenth spot. Her fourth single to chart was "Kids" at the end of the year with Robbie Williams - the song peaked at number one.

Spice Girls member Melanie C was one of a number of artists with three top-ten entries, including number-one solo single "I Turn to You" and "Holler"/"Let Love Lead the Way" with the group, which also reached the top spot. A1, Destiny's Child, Oasis, Sonique and Vengaboys were among the other artists who had multiple top 10 entries in 2000.

=== Chart debuts ===
Ninety-one artists achieved their first top 10 single in 2000, either as a lead or featured artist. Of these, eleven went on to record another hit single that year: Coldplay, Darude, Dr. Dre, Madison Avenue, Oxide & Neutrino, Pink, Richard Blackwood, Santana, Scooch, Sisqó and True Steppers. DJ Luck & MC Neat and Sonique both had two other entries in their breakthrough year.

The following table (collapsed on desktop site) does not include acts who had previously charted as part of a group and secured their first top 10 solo single.

Artist	Number of top 10s	First entry	Chart position	Other entries
Donell Jones	1	"U Know What's Up"	2	—
Scooch	2	"More Than I Needed to Know"	5	"The Best Is Yet to Come" (7)
Point Break	1	"Stand Tough"	7	—
Scanty Sandwich	1	"Because of You"	3	—
Des Mitchell	1	"(Welcome) To the Dance"	5	—
Hi-Gate	1	"Pitchin' (In Every Direction)"	6	—
Nu Generation	1	"In Your Arms (Rescue Me)"	8	—
DJ Luck & MC Neat	3	"A Little Bit of Luck"	9	"Masterblaster 2000" (5), "Ain't No Stoppin' Us" (8)
Andreas Johnson	1	"Glorious"	4	—
Lyte Funkie Ones	1	"Girl on TV"	6	—
Daphne and Celeste	1	"Ooh Stick You"	8	—
Fierce	1	"Sweet Love 2K"	3	—
Death in Vegas	1	"Aisha"	9	—
Joey Negro	1	"Must Be the Music"	8	—
Taka Boom	1	"Must Be the Music"	8	—
Romina Johnson	1	"Movin' Too Fast"	2	—
Kelis	1	"Caught Out There"	4	—
Jamelia	1	"Money"	5	—
Lene Marlin	1	"Sitting Down Here"	5	—
Blink-182	1	"All the Small Things"	2	—
Dr. Dre	2	"Still D.R.E."	6	"Forgot About Dre" (7)
Santana	2	"Smooth"	3	"Maria Maria" (6)
Rob Thomas	1	"Smooth"	3	—
Sweet Female Attitude	1	"Flowers"	2	—
Bloodhound Gang	1	"The Bad Touch"	4	—
Lock 'n' Load	1	"Blow Ya Mind"	6	—
Rank 1	1	"Airwave"	10	—
Fragma	1	"Toca's Miracle"	1	—
Sisqó	2	"Thong Song"	3	"Unleash the Dragon" (6)
Jessica Simpson	1	"I Wanna Love You Forever"	7	—
True Steppers	2	"Buggin'"	6	"Out of Your Mind" (2)
Meja	1	"Private Emotion"	9	—
Oxide & Neutrino	2	"Bound 4 da Reload (Casualty)"	1	"No Good 4 Me" (6)
Mandy Moore	1	"Candy"	6	—
M. J. Cole	1	"Crazy Love"	10	—
Toploader	1	"Achilles Heel"	8	—
Madison Avenue	2	"Don't Call Me Baby"	1	"Who the Hell Are You" (10)
Paul van Dyk	1	"Tell Me Why (The Riddle)"	7	—
Saint Etienne	1	"Tell Me Why (The Riddle)"	7	—
Southside Spinners	1	"Luvstruk"	9	—
Sonique	3	"It Feels So Good"	1	"Sky" (2), "I Put a Spell on You" (8)
Sia	1	"Taken for Granted"	10	—
York	1	"On the Beach"	4	—
Mary Mary	1	"Shackles (Praise You)"	5	—
Pink	2	"There You Go"	6	"Most Girls" (5)
Richard Blackwood	2	"Mama Who Da Man"	3	"1.2.3.4 Get with the Wicked" (10)
B-15 Project	1	"Girls Like Us"	7	—
Crissy D	1	"Girls Like Us"	7	—
Lady G	1	"Girls Like Us"	7	—
Black Legend	1	"You See the Trouble with Me"	1	—
Darude	2	"Sandstorm"	3	"Feel the Beat" (5)
David Gray	1	"Babylon"	5	—
Girl Thing	1	"Last One Standing"	8	—
Samantha Mumba	1	"Gotta Tell You"	2	"Body II Body" (5)
Coldplay	2	"Yellow"	4	"Trouble" (10)
Lonyo	1	"Summer of Love"	8	—
Limp Bizkit	1	"Take a Look Around"	3	—
Robbie Craig	1	"Woman Trouble"	6	—
Aaliyah	1	"Try Again"	5	—
Bomfunk MC's	1	"Freestyler"	2	—
The Product G&B	1	"Maria Maria"	6	—
Storm	1	"Time to Burn"	3	—
Wookie	1	"Battle"	10	—
Lain	1	"Battle"	10	—
Bob Sinclar	1	"I Feel for You"	9	—
Spiller	1	"Groovejet (If This Ain't Love)"	1	—
Elementfour	1	"Big Brother UK TV Theme"	4	—
Modjo	1	"Lady (Hear Me Tonight)"	1	—
Planet Perfecto	1	"Bullet in the Gun 2000"	7	—
Aurora	1	"Ordinary World"	5	—
Naimee Coleman	1	"Ordinary World"	5	—
Sugababes	1	"Overload"	6	—
Vanessa Amorosi	1	"Absolutely Everybody"	7	—
Zombie Nation	1	"Kernkraft 400"	2	—
Anastacia	1	"I'm Outta Love"	6	—
Architechs	1	"Body Groove"	3	—
Nana	1	"Body Groove"	3	—
JJ	1	"Ain't No Stoppin' Us"	8	—
Delerium	1	"Silence (Remixes)"	3	—
Sarah McLachlan	1	"Silence (Remixes)"	3	—
Azzido Da Bass	1	"Dooms Night"	8	—
Baha Men	1	"Who Let the Dogs Out"	2	—
Tweenies	1	"No. 1"	5	—
Nelly	1	"Country Grammar (Hot S**t)"	7	—
Kandi	1	"Don't Think I'm Not"	9	—
Lifford	1	"Please Don't Turn Me On"	4	—
Public Domain	1	"Operation Blade (Bass in the Place)"	5	—
Warp Brothers	1	"Phatt Bass"	9	—
Aquagen	1	"Phatt Bass"	9	—
Bob the Builder	1	"Can We Fix It?"	1	—
Megaman	1	"No Good 4 Me"	6	—

Notes

Rebecca Wheatley was part of the Casualty cast who covered "Everlasting Love" in 1998, peaking at number five. "Stay With Me (Baby)" was her first and, to date, only single as a solo artist. Richard Ashcroft" had previous chart success with The Verve, including number-one "Bitter Sweet Symphony"; his 2000 single "A Song for the Lovers" marked his solo debut. Dane Bowers was a member of "Another Level", recording seven top 10 singles prior to his featured credits on the True Steppers songs "Out of Your Mind" (also featuring Victoria Beckham, who achieved her first top 10 away from Spice Girls) and "Buggin".

Watergate was another alias of Orhan Terzi, also known as DJ Quicksilver, who reached number 4 with "Bellissima" in 1997. Prior to 2000 Stephen Gately had sixteen top 10 singles with his band Boyzone, and "New Beginning"/"Bright Eyes" marked his first entry in his own right.

=== Songs from films ===
Original songs from various films entered the top 10 throughout the year. These included "The Great Beyond" (from Man on the Moon), "Pure Shores" (The Beach), "Try Again" (Romeo Must Die), "Take a Look Around" (Mission: Impossible 2), "Doesn't Really Matter" (Nutty Professor II: The Klumps), "Can't Fight the Moonlight" (Coyote Ugly) and "Independent Women" (Charlie's Angels).

=== Charity singles ===
S Club 7 recorded the Children in Need single, "Never Had a Dream Come True" which topped the chart for one week on 9 December 2000. It was the band's sixth top 10 single and their second number one, their first since their debut "Bring It All Back" in 1999.

=== Best-selling singles ===
Bob the Builder, the children's TV character voiced by Neil Morrissey, had the best-selling single of the year with "Can We Fix It?". The song spent six weeks in the top 10, including 3 at number one, sold over 850,000 copies and was certified platinum by the BPI. "Pure Shores" by All Saints came in second place, selling more than 685,000 copies and losing out by around 165,000 sales. Sonique's "It Feels So Good", "Who Let the Dogs Out?" from Baha Men, and "Rock DJ by Robbie Williams made up the top five. Singles by Eminem featuring Dido, Fragma, Spiller S Club 7 and Craig David were also in the top ten best-selling singles of the year.

"Can We Fix It?" (10) was also ranked in the top 10 best-selling singles of the decade.

== Top-ten singles ==
Symbol	Meaning
‡	Single peaked in 1999 but still in chart in 2000.
(#)	Year-end top-ten single position and rank
Entered	The date that the single first appeared in the chart.
Peak	Highest position that the single reached in the UK Singles Chart.

Entered (week ending)	Weeks in top 10	Single	Artist	Peak	Peak reached (week ending)	Weeks at peak
Singles in 1999
27 November 1999	7	"The Millennium Prayer" ‡	Cliff Richard	1	4 December 1999	3
4 December 1999	7	"Back in My Life" ‡ ^{[A]}	Alice Deejay	4	11 December 1999	1
11 December 1999	8	"Re-Rewind (The Crowd Say Bo Selecta)" ‡	Artful Dodger featuring Craig David	2	11 December 1999	3
11 December 1999	1	"Right Now" ‡	Atomic Kitten	10	11 December 1999	1
18 December 1999	5	"Kiss (When the Sun Don't Shine)" ‡	Vengaboys	3	18 December 1999	1
18 December 1999	4	"Barber's Adagio for Strings" ‡ ^{[B]}	William Orbit	4	18 December 1999	1
18 December 1999	3	"Steal My Sunshine" ‡ ^{[C]}	Len	8	18 December 1999	1
25 December 1999	6	"I Have a Dream"/"Seasons in the Sun" ‡	Westlife	1	25 December 1999	4
25 December 1999	4	"Imagine" ‡ ^{[D]}	John Lennon	3	25 December 1999	2
25 December 1999	3	"Cognoscenti vs. Intelligentsia" ‡	Cuban Boys	4	25 December 1999	1
25 December 1999	5	"Two in a Million"/"You're My Number One"	S Club 7	2	8 January 2000	1
25 December 1999	4	"Say You'll Be Mine"/"Better the Devil You Know"	Steps	4	8 January 2000	2
25 December 1999	3	"Mr. Hankey, the Christmas Poo" ‡	Mr. Hankey	4	1 January 2000	1
Singles in 2000
15 January 2000	1	"You Only Tell Me You Love Me When You're Drunk"	Pet Shop Boys	8	15 January 2000	1
22 January 2000	2	"The Masses Against the Classes"	Manic Street Preachers	1	22 January 2000	1
22 January 2000	4	"U Know What's Up"	Donell Jones	2	22 January 2000	2
22 January 2000	1	"More Than I Needed to Know"	Scooch	5	22 January 2000	1
22 January 2000	1	"Stand Tough"	Point Break	7	22 January 2000	1
29 January 2000	5	"Born to Make You Happy"	Britney Spears	1	29 January 2000	1
29 January 2000	2	"Because of You"	Scanty Sandwich	3	29 January 2000	1
29 January 2000	1	"(Welcome) To the Dance"	Des Mitchell	5	29 January 2000	1
29 January 2000	1	"Pitchin' (In Every Direction)"	Hi-Gate	6	29 January 2000	1
29 January 2000	2	"In Your Arms (Rescue Me)"	Nu Generation	8	29 January 2000	1
29 January 2000	4	"A Little Bit of Luck"	DJ Luck & MC Neat	9	29 January 2000	2
5 February 2000	5	"Rise"	Gabrielle	1	5 February 2000	2
5 February 2000	3	"The Great Beyond"	R.E.M.	3	5 February 2000	1
5 February 2000	3	"Glorious"	Andreas Johnson	4	5 February 2000	1
5 February 2000	1	"Girl on TV"	Lyte Funkie Ones	6	5 February 2000	1
5 February 2000	1	"Ooh Stick You!"	Daphne and Celeste	8	5 February 2000	1
12 February 2000	3	"Adelante"	Sash!	2	12 February 2000	1
12 February 2000	1	"Sweet Love 2K"	Fierce	3	12 February 2000	1
12 February 2000	1	"Hammer to the Heart"	The Tamperer featuring Maya	6	12 February 2000	1
12 February 2000	1	"Aisha"	Death in Vegas featuring Iggy Pop	9	12 February 2000	1
19 February 2000	2	"Go Let It Out"	Oasis	1	19 February 2000	1
19 February 2000	3	"Move Your Body"	Eiffel 65	3	19 February 2000	1
19 February 2000	1	"Dolphins Were Monkeys"	Ian Brown	5	19 February 2000	1
19 February 2000	1	"Must Be The Music"	Joey Negro featuring Taka Boom	8	19 February 2000	1
26 February 2000	6	"Pure Shores" (#2)	All Saints	1	26 February 2000	2
26 February 2000	2	"What a Girl Wants"	Christina Aguilera	3	26 February 2000	1
26 February 2000	1	"Don't Be Stupid (You Know I Love You)"	Shania Twain	5	26 February 2000	1
26 February 2000	2	"Cartoon Heroes"	Aqua	7	26 February 2000	1
26 February 2000	1	"Stay With Me (Baby)"	Rebecca Wheatley	10	26 February 2000	1
4 March 2000	3	"Movin' Too Fast"	Artful Dodger & Romina Johnson	2	4 March 2000	1
4 March 2000	2	"Show Me the Meaning of Being Lonely"	Backstreet Boys	3	4 March 2000	1
4 March 2000	1	"Caught Out There"	Kelis	4	4 March 2000	1
4 March 2000	1	"Money"	Jamelia featuring Beenie Man	5	4 March 2000	1
4 March 2000	1	"Like a Rose"	A1	6	4 March 2000	1
11 March 2000	4	"American Pie"	Madonna	1	11 March 2000	1
11 March 2000	2	"Bye Bye Bye"	NSYNC	3	11 March 2000	1
11 March 2000	3	"Shalala Lala"	Vengaboys	5	11 March 2000	1
11 March 2000	3	"Sitting Down Here"	Lene Marlin	5	18 March 2000	1
11 March 2000	1	"Won't Take It Lying Down"	The Honeyz	7	11 March 2000	1
11 March 2000	2	"Satisfy You"	Puff Daddy featuring R. Kelly	8	11 March 2000	1
11 March 2000	1	"Thank God I Found You"	Mariah Carey featuring Joe & 98 Degrees	10	11 March 2000	1
18 March 2000	4	"Don't Give Up"	Chicane featuring Bryan Adams	1	18 March 2000	1
18 March 2000	2	"Mama Told Me Not to Come"	Tom Jones & Stereophonics	4	18 March 2000	1
18 March 2000	1	"Don't Wanna Let You Go"	Five	9	18 March 2000	1
25 March 2000	3	"Bag It Up"	Geri Halliwell	1	25 March 2000	1
25 March 2000	3	"All the Small Things"	Blink-182	2	25 March 2000	1
25 March 2000	2	"Killer"	ATB	4	25 March 2000	1
25 March 2000	3	"Still D.R.E."	Dr. Dre featuring Snoop Dogg	6	25 March 2000	1
1 April 2000	4	"Never Be the Same Again"	Melanie C featuring Lisa "Left Eye" Lopes	1	1 April 2000	1
1 April 2000	2	"The Time Is Now"	Moloko	2	1 April 2000	1
1 April 2000	2	"Smooth"	Santana featuring Rob Thomas	3	1 April 2000	1
8 April 2000	2	"Fool Again"	Westlife	1	8 April 2000	1
8 April 2000	2	"Say My Name"	Destiny's Child	3	8 April 2000	1
8 April 2000	1	"See Ya"	Atomic Kitten	6	8 April 2000	1
15 April 2000	5	"Fill Me In" (#10)	Craig David	1	15 April 2000	1
15 April 2000	5	"Flowers"	Sweet Female Attitude	2	15 April 2000	1
15 April 2000	1	"A Song for the Lovers"	Richard Ashcroft	3	15 April 2000	1
15 April 2000	2	"Deeper Shade of Blue"	Steps	4	15 April 2000	1
15 April 2000	8	"The Bad Touch"	Bloodhound Gang	4	6 May 2000	1
15 April 2000	3	"Blow Ya Mind"	Lock 'n' Load	6	15 April 2000	2
15 April 2000	1	"Airwave"	Rank 1	10	15 April 2000	1
22 April 2000	5	"Toca's Miracle" (#7)	Fragma	1	22 April 2000	2
22 April 2000	4	"Thong Song"	Sisqó	3	22 April 2000	2
22 April 2000	1	"I Wanna Love You Forever"	Jessica Simpson	7	22 April 2000	1
22 April 2000	1	"Just Around the Hill"	Sash!	8	22 April 2000	1
29 April 2000	1	"Who Feels Love?"	Oasis	4	29 April 2000	1
29 April 2000	3	"He Wasn't Man Enough"	Toni Braxton	5	29 April 2000	1
29 April 2000	2	"Buggin"	True Steppers featuring Dane Bowers	6	29 April 2000	1
29 April 2000	1	"Private Emotion"	Ricky Martin featuring Meja	9	29 April 2000	1
6 May 2000	4	"Bound 4 da Reload (Casualty)"	Oxide & Neutrino	1	6 May 2000	1
6 May 2000	1	"Candy"	Mandy Moore	6	6 May 2000	1
6 May 2000	1	"Crazy Love"	M.J. Cole	10	6 May 2000	1
13 May 2000	5	"Oops!... I Did It Again"	Britney Spears	1	13 May 2000	1
13 May 2000	3	"Heart of Asia"	Watergate	3	13 May 2000	1
13 May 2000	1	"Achilles Heel"	Toploader	8	13 May 2000	1
20 May 2000	4	"Don't Call Me Baby" ^{[E]}	Madison Avenue	1	20 May 2000	1
20 May 2000	3	"Sex Bomb"	Tom Jones & Mousse T.	3	20 May 2000	1
20 May 2000	2	"Koochy"	Armand van Helden	4	20 May 2000	1
20 May 2000	1	"Tell Me Why (The Riddle)"	Paul van Dyk featuring Saint Etienne	7	20 May 2000	1
20 May 2000	1	"The Wicker Man"	Iron Maiden	9	20 May 2000	1
27 May 2000	2	"Day & Night"	Billie Piper	1	27 May 2000	1
27 May 2000	2	"Masterblaster 2000"	DJ Luck & MC Neat	5	27 May 2000	1
27 May 2000	1	"Luvstruk"	Southside Spinners	9	27 May 2000	1
3 June 2000	6	"It Feels So Good" (#3) ^{[F]}	Sonique	1	3 June 2000	3
3 June 2000	5	"Reach"	S Club 7	2	3 June 2000	3
3 June 2000	2	"It's My Life"	Bon Jovi	3	3 June 2000	1
3 June 2000	1	"Taken for Granted"	Sia	10	3 June 2000	1
10 June 2000	1	"New Beginning"/"Bright Eyes"	Stephen Gately	3	10 June 2000	1
10 June 2000	3	"On the Beach"	York	4	10 June 2000	2
10 June 2000	4	"Shackles (Praise You)"	Mary Mary	5	10 June 2000	1
10 June 2000	1	"There You Go"	Pink	6	10 June 2000	1
10 June 2000	1	"Forgot About Dre"	Dr. Dre featuring Eminem	7	10 June 2000	1
17 June 2000	2	"Mama Who Da Man"	Richard Blackwood	3	17 June 2000	1
17 June 2000	1	"Coming Around"	Travis	5	17 June 2000	1
17 June 2000	2	"When a Woman"	Gabrielle	6	17 June 2000	1
17 June 2000	1	"Girls Like Us"	B-15 Project featuring Crissy D & Lady G	7	17 June 2000	1
17 June 2000	1	"If I Told You That"	Whitney Houston & George Michael	9	17 June 2000	1
17 June 2000	1	"Jerusalem"	Fat Les 2000	10	17 June 2000	1
24 June 2000	3	"You See the Trouble with Me"	Black Legend	1	24 June 2000	1
24 June 2000	5	"Sandstorm"	Darude	3	24 June 2000	2
24 June 2000	1	"Porcelain"	Moby	5	24 June 2000	1
24 June 2000	1	"The One"	Backstreet Boys	8	24 June 2000	1
1 July 2000	2	"Spinning Around"	Kylie Minogue	1	1 July 2000	1
1 July 2000	2	"Babylon"	David Gray	5	1 July 2000	1
1 July 2000	1	"The Power Of Love (2000 Remixes)" ^{[G]}	Frankie Goes to Hollywood	6	1 July 2000	1
1 July 2000	1	"Ghetto Romance"	Damage	7	1 July 2000	1
1 July 2000	1	"Last One Standing"	Girl Thing	8	1 July 2000	1
8 July 2000	8	"The Real Slim Shady"	Eminem	1	8 July 2000	1
8 July 2000	3	"Gotta Tell You"	Samantha Mumba	2	8 July 2000	1
8 July 2000	1	"Yellow"	Coldplay	4	8 July 2000	1
8 July 2000	1	"Uncle John from Jamaica"	Vengaboys	6	8 July 2000	1
8 July 2000	1	"Summer of Love"	Lonyo	8	8 July 2000	1
15 July 2000	4	"Breathless"	The Corrs	1	15 July 2000	1
15 July 2000	4	"Take a Look Around"	Limp Bizkit	3	15 July 2000	1
15 July 2000	1	"Sunday Morning Call"	Oasis	4	15 July 2000	1
15 July 2000	2	"When I Said Goodbye"/"Summer of Love"	Steps	5	15 July 2000	1
15 July 2000	2	"Woman Trouble"	Artful Dodger & Robbie Craig featuring Craig David	6	15 July 2000	1
15 July 2000	3	"Will I Ever"	Alice Deejay	7	15 July 2000	1
15 July 2000	1	"I Want Your Love"	Atomic Kitten	10	15 July 2000	1
22 July 2000	5	"Life Is a Rollercoaster"	Ronan Keating	1	22 July 2000	1
22 July 2000	2	"Try Again"	Aaliyah	5	22 July 2000	1
29 July 2000	4	"We Will Rock You"	Five + Queen	1	29 July 2000	1
29 July 2000	3	"2 Faced"	Louise	3	29 July 2000	1
29 July 2000	2	"Jumpin', Jumpin'"	Destiny's Child	5	29 July 2000	1
29 July 2000	1	"Affirmation"	Savage Garden	8	29 July 2000	1
5 August 2000	5	"7 Days"	Craig David	1	5 August 2000	1
5 August 2000	6	"Freestyler"	Bomfunk MC's	2	5 August 2000	1
5 August 2000	1	"Maria Maria"	Santana featuring The Product G&B	6	5 August 2000	1
12 August 2000	5	"Rock DJ" (#5)	Robbie Williams	1	12 August 2000	1
12 August 2000	4	"Time to Burn"	Storm	3	12 August 2000	1
12 August 2000	1	"I Can Only Disappoint U"	Mansun	8	12 August 2000	1
12 August 2000	1	"Battle"	Wookie featuring Lain	10	12 August 2000	1
19 August 2000	4	"I Turn to You"	Melanie C	1	19 August 2000	1
19 August 2000	3	"Doesn't Really Matter"	Janet Jackson	5	19 August 2000	1
19 August 2000	1	"I Feel for You"	Bob Sinclar	9	19 August 2000	1
26 August 2000	4	"Groovejet (If This Ain't Love)" (#8)	Spiller	1	26 August 2000	1
26 August 2000	3	"Out of Your Mind"	True Steppers & Dane Bowers featuring Victoria Beckham	2	26 August 2000	1
26 August 2000	3	"Lucky"	Britney Spears	5	26 August 2000	1
2 September 2000	3	"Music"	Madonna	1	2 September 2000	1
9 September 2000	2	"Take On Me"	A1	1	9 September 2000	1
9 September 2000	3	"Big Brother UK TV Theme"	Elementfour	4	9 September 2000	1
9 September 2000	1	"Say It Isn't So"	Bon Jovi	10	9 September 2000	1
16 September 2000	5	"Lady (Hear Me Tonight)"	Modjo	1	16 September 2000	2
16 September 2000	4	"Sky"	Sonique	2	16 September 2000	1
16 September 2000	2	"It Doesn't Matter"	Wyclef Jean	3	16 September 2000	1
16 September 2000	1	"Bullet in the Gun 2000"	Planet Perfecto	7	16 September 2000	1
16 September 2000	1	"It's Gonna Be Me"	NSYNC	9	16 September 2000	1
16 September 2000	1	"1.2.3.4 Get with the Wicked"	Richard Blackwood	10	16 September 2000	1
23 September 2000	1	"On a Night Like This"	Kylie Minogue	2	23 September 2000	1
23 September 2000	2	"Natural"	S Club 7	3	23 September 2000	1
23 September 2000	1	"Ordinary World"	Aurora featuring Naimee Coleman	5	23 September 2000	1
23 September 2000	3	"Overload"	Sugababes	6	23 September 2000	1
23 September 2000	1	"Absolutely Everybody"	Vanessa Amorosi	7	23 September 2000	1
23 September 2000	1	"With My Own Eyes"	Sash!	10	23 September 2000	1
30 September 2000	4	"Against All Odds"	Mariah Carey featuring Westlife	1	30 September 2000	2
30 September 2000	4	"Kernkraft 400"	Zombie Nation	2	30 September 2000	2
30 September 2000	1	"Something Deep Inside"	Billie Piper	4	30 September 2000	1
30 September 2000	2	"Most Girls"	Pink	5	30 September 2000	1
30 September 2000	1	"Unleash the Dragon"	Sisqó featuring Beanie Sigel	6	30 September 2000	1
30 September 2000	3	"I'm Outta Love"	Anastacia	6	7 October 2000	1
7 October 2000	4	"Body Groove"	Architechs featuring Nana	3	7 October 2000	1
7 October 2000	1	"Tell Me"	Melanie B	4	7 October 2000	1
7 October 2000	1	"Ain't No Stoppin' Us"	DJ Luck & MC Neat featuring JJ	8	7 October 2000	1
14 October 2000	4	"Black Coffee"	All Saints	1	14 October 2000	1
14 October 2000	4	"Silence (Remixes)" ^{[H]}	Delerium featuring Sarah McLachlan	3	14 October 2000	1
14 October 2000	1	"In Demand"	Texas	6	14 October 2000	1
14 October 2000	2	"Could I Have This Kiss Forever"	Whitney Houston & Enrique Iglesias	7	14 October 2000	1
14 October 2000	1	"The Way I Am"	Eminem	8	14 October 2000	1
21 October 2000	2	"Beautiful Day"	U2	1	21 October 2000	1
21 October 2000	3	"Kids"	Robbie Williams & Kylie Minogue	2	21 October 2000	1
21 October 2000	1	"Dooms Night"	Azzido Da Bass	8	21 October 2000	1
21 October 2000	1	"Who the Hell Are You"	Madison Avenue	10	21 October 2000	1
28 October 2000	3	"Stomp"	Steps	1	28 October 2000	1
28 October 2000	12	"Who Let the Dogs Out" (#4)	Baha Men	2	28 October 2000	2
28 October 2000	2	"Body II Body"	Samantha Mumba	5	28 October 2000	1
28 October 2000	1	"Sunset (Bird of Prey)"	Fatboy Slim	9	28 October 2000	1
28 October 2000	1	"Music Is My Radar"	Blur	10	28 October 2000	1
4 November 2000	3	"Holler"/"Let Love Lead The Way"	Spice Girls	1	4 November 2000	1
4 November 2000	3	"I'm Over You"	Martine McCutcheon	2	4 November 2000	1
4 November 2000	3	"She Bangs"	Ricky Martin	3	4 November 2000	1
4 November 2000	1	"Trouble"	Coldplay	10	4 November 2000	1
11 November 2000	3	"My Love"	Westlife	1	11 November 2000	1
11 November 2000	8	"No. 1"	Tweenies	5	18 November 2000	1
11 November 2000	1	"Country Grammar (Hot S**t)"	Nelly	7	11 November 2000	1
11 November 2000	1	"Come On Over Baby (All I Want Is You)"	Christina Aguilera	8	11 November 2000	1
11 November 2000	2	"Don't Think I'm Not"	Kandi	9	11 November 2000	2
18 November 2000	2	"Same Old Brand New You"	A1	1	18 November 2000	1
18 November 2000	2	"Shape of My Heart"	Backstreet Boys	4	18 November 2000	1
18 November 2000	1	"Original Prankster"	The Offspring	6	18 November 2000	1
25 November 2000	7	"Can't Fight the Moonlight"	LeAnn Rimes	1	25 November 2000	1
25 November 2000	2	"One More Time"	Daft Punk	2	25 November 2000	1
25 November 2000	2	"Please Don't Turn Me On"	Artful Dodger featuring Lifford	4	25 November 2000	1
25 November 2000	2	"Feel the Beat"	Darude	5	25 November 2000	1
25 November 2000	1	"Gravel Pit"	Wu-Tang Clan	6	25 November 2000	1
2 December 2000	7	"Independent Women"	Destiny's Child	1	2 December 2000	1
2 December 2000	2	"Walking Away"	Craig David	3	2 December 2000	1
2 December 2000	5	"Operation Blade (Bass In The Place)" ^{[I]}	Public Domain	5	2 December 2000	2
2 December 2000	1	"The Way You Make Me Feel"	Ronan Keating	6	2 December 2000	1
9 December 2000	6	"Never Had a Dream Come True" (#9) ^{[J]}	S Club 7	1	9 December 2000	1
9 December 2000	1	"Don't Tell Me"	Madonna	4	9 December 2000	1
9 December 2000	1	"I Put a Spell on You" ^{[K]}	Sonique	8	9 December 2000	1
9 December 2000	1	"Phatt Bass"	Warp Brothers vs. Aquagen	9	9 December 2000	1
16 December 2000	6	"Stan" (#6)	Eminem featuring Dido	1	16 December 2000	1
16 December 2000	6	"Can We Fix It?" (#1)	Bob the Builder ^{[L]}	1	23 December 2000	3
16 December 2000	2	"Stronger" ^{[M]}	Britney Spears	7	16 December 2000	1
16 December 2000	1	"911"	Wyclef Jean featuring Mary J. Blige	9	16 December 2000	1
23 December 2000	2	"Supreme"	Robbie Williams	4	23 December 2000	1
23 December 2000	1	"Please Stay"	Kylie Minogue	10	23 December 2000	1
30 December 2000	3	"What Makes a Man"	Westlife	2	30 December 2000	1
30 December 2000	3	"No Good 4 Me"	Oxide & Neutrino featuring Megaman, Romeo & Lisa Maffia	6	30 December 2000	2

== Entries by artist ==
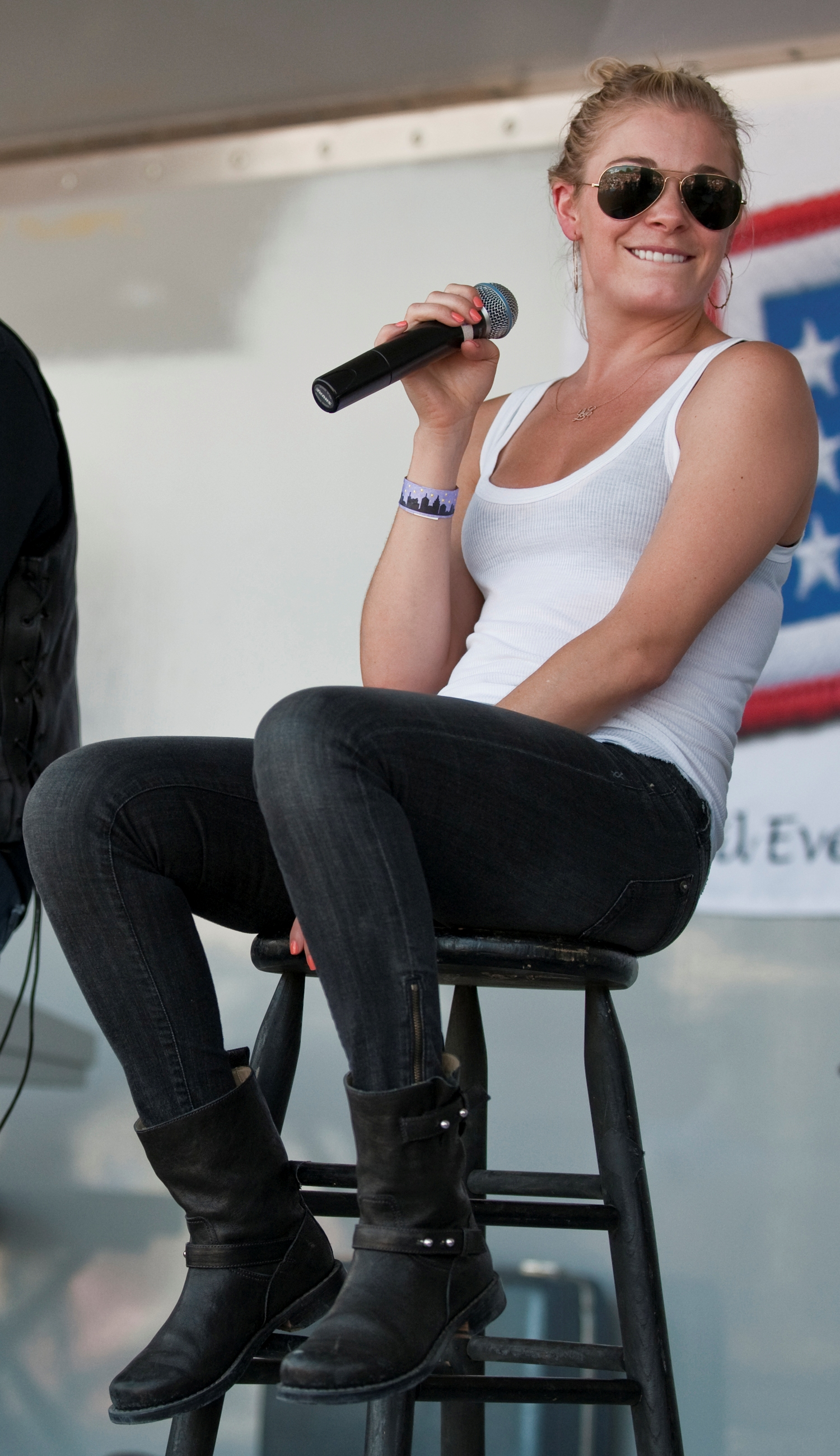
US country music singer LeAnn Rimes (pictured in 2010) reached number-one in November 2000 with "Can't Fight the Moonlight", the theme song from the movie Coyote Ugly.

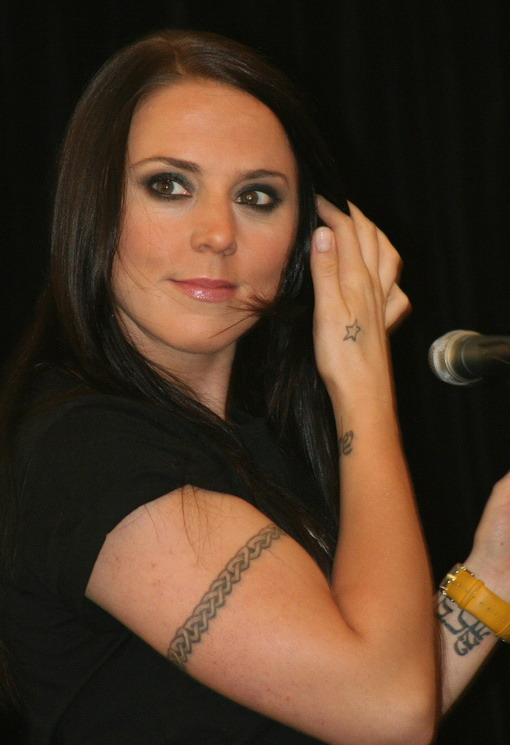
Melanie C, known as Sporty Spice in the Spice Girls, secured two solo entries this year, "I Turn to You" and "Never Be the Same Again", which both spent a week at number-one. Her final single with the band, "Holler"/"Let Love Lead the Way" also reached the top of the charts in November.

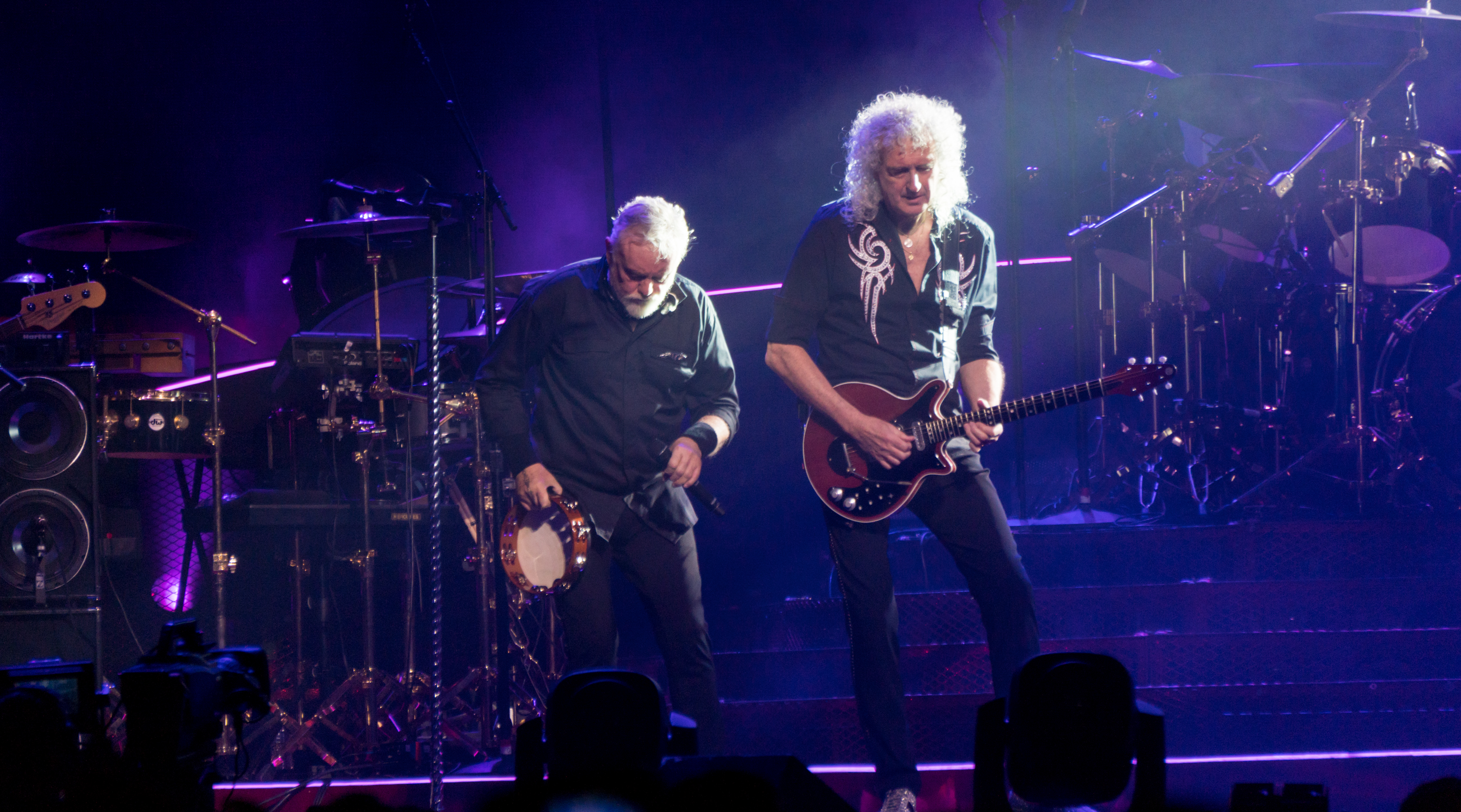
Brian May and Roger Taylor from Queen (pictured in 2017) joined forces with boy band Five for a cover version of "We Will Rock You", which reached number-one in July 2000.

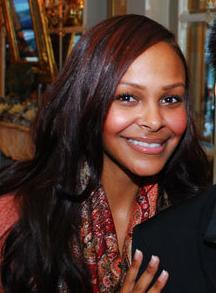
Ireland's Samantha Mumba scored two top 10 hits during the year: "Gotta Tell You" peaked at number two while "Body II Body" reached number five.

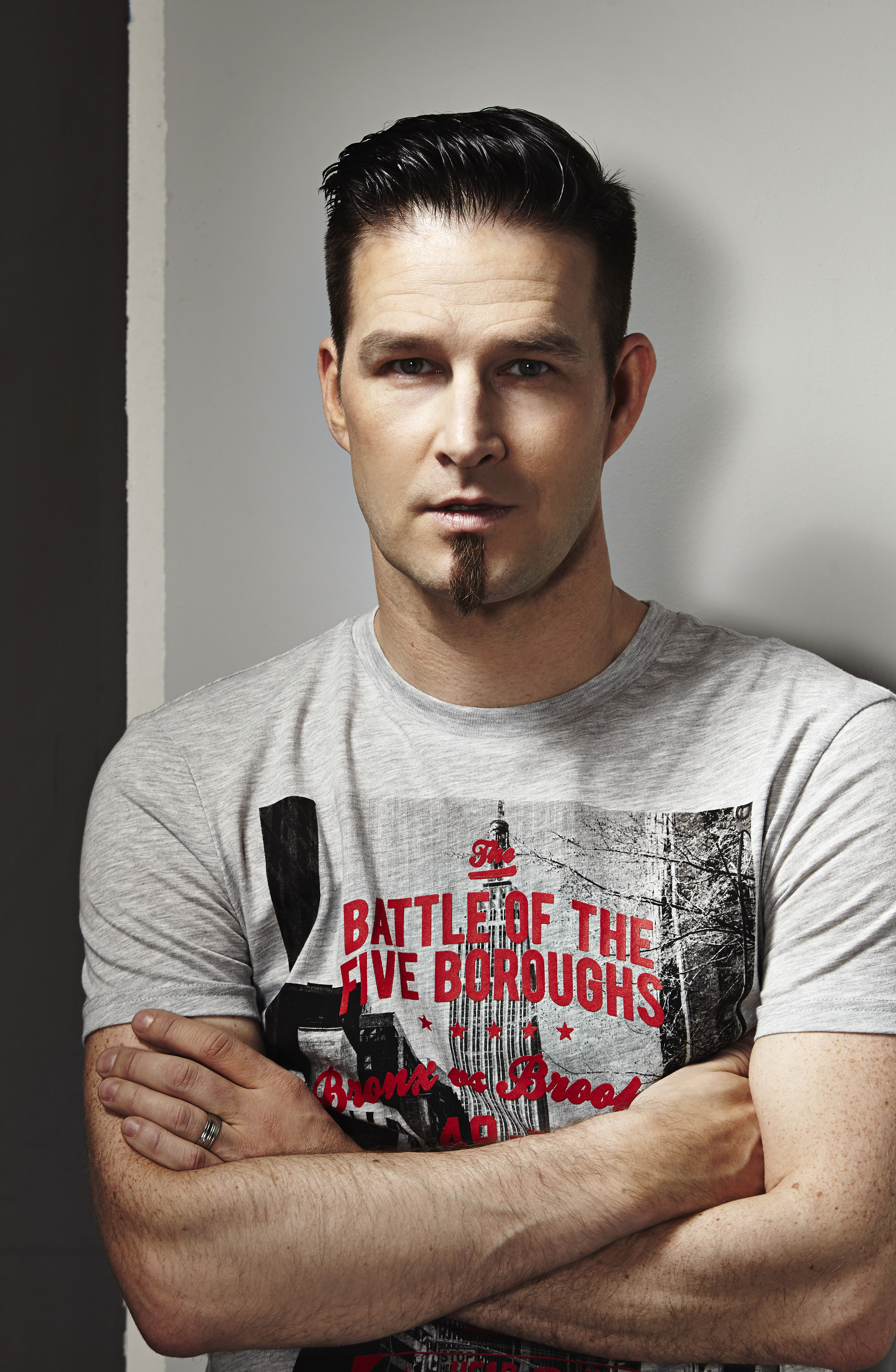
Finnish DJ Darude reached number three in June with his debut single and signature song "Sandstorm". His follow up single "Feel the Beat" also charted in the top 10, peaking at number five.

The following table shows artists who achieved two or more top 10 entries in 2000, including singles that reached their peak in 1999. The figures include both main artists and featured artists, while appearances on ensemble charity records are also counted for each artist. The total number of weeks an artist spent in the top ten in 2000 is also shown.

Entries	Artist	Weeks	Singles
5	Craig David ^{[N]}^{[O]}	22	"7 Days", "Fill Me In", "Re-Rewind", "Walking Away", "Woman Trouble"
5	Westlife ^{[N]}	18	"Against All Odds", "Fool Again", "I Have a Dream"/"Seasons in the Sun", "My Love", "What Makes a Man"
4	Artful Dodger ^{[N]}	15	"Movin' Too Fast", "Please Don't Turn Me On", "Re-Rewind (The Crowd Say Bo Selecta)", "Woman Trouble"
4	Britney Spears	14	"Born to Make You Happy", "Lucky", "Oops!...I Did It Again", "Stronger"
4	Eminem ^{[P]}	16	"Forgot About Dre, "The Real Slim Shady", "Stan", "The Way I Am"
4	Kylie Minogue	7	"Kids", "On a Night Like This", "Please Stay", "Spinning Around"
4	S Club 7 ^{[Q]}	16	"Natural", "Never Had a Dream Come True", "Reach", "Two in a Million"/"You're My Number One"
4	Steps ^{[Q]}	11	"Deeper Shade of Blue", "Say You'll Be Mine"/"Better the Devil You Know", "Stomp", "When I Said Goodbye"/"Summer of Love"
3	A1	5	"Like a Rose", "Same Old Brand New You", "Take On Me"
3	Atomic Kitten ^{[N]}	5	"I Want Your Love", "Right Now", "See Ya"
3	Backstreet Boys	5	"The One", "Shape of My Heart", "Show Me the Meaning of Being Lonely"
3	Melanie C ^{[R]}	11	"Holler"/"Let Love Lead the Way", "I Turn to You", "Never Be the Same Again"
3	Destiny's Child	11	"Independent Women", "Jumpin', Jumpin'", "Say My Name"
3	DJ Luck & MC Neat	7	"Ain't No Stoppin' Us", "A Little Bit of Luck", "Masterblaster 2000"
3	Madonna	8	"American Pie", "Don't Tell Me", "Music"
3	Oasis	4	"Go Let It Out", "Sunday Morning Call", "Who Feels Love?"
3	Sash!	5	"Adelante", "Just Around the Hill", "With My Own Eyes"
3	Sonique	11	"I Put a Spell on You", "It Feels So Good", "Sky"
3	Vengaboys ^{[N]}	9	"Kiss (When the Sun Don't Shine)", "Shalala Lala", "Uncle John from Jamaica"
3	Robbie Williams	10	"Kids", "Rock DJ", "Supreme"
2	Alice Deejay ^{[N]}	6	"Back in My Life", "Will I Ever"
2	All Saints	10	"Black Coffee", "Pure Shores"
2	Billie Piper	3	"Day & Night", "Something Deep Inside"
2	Bon Jovi	3	"It's My Life", "Say It Isn't So"
2	Christina Aguilera	3	"Come On Over Baby (All I Want Is You)", "What a Girl Wants"
2	Coldplay	2	"Trouble", "Yellow"
2	Dane Bowers ^{[S]}	5	"Buggin", "Out of Your Mind"
2	Darude	7	"Feel the Beat", "Sandstorm"
2	Dr. Dre	4	"Forgot About Dre", "Still D.R.E."
2	Five	5	"Don't Wanna Let You Go", "We Will Rock You"
2	Gabrielle	7	"Rise", "When a Woman"
2	Madison Avenue	5	"Don't Call Me Baby", "Who the Hell Are You"
2	Mariah Carey	5	"Against All Odds", "Thank God I Found You"
2	Melanie B ^{[R]}	4	"Holler"/"Let Love Lead the Way", "Tell Me"
2	NSYNC	3	"Bye Bye Bye", "It's Gonna Be Me"
2	Oxide & Neutrino	5	"Bound 4 da Reload (Casualty)", "No Good 4 Me"
2	Pink	3	"Most Girls", "There You Go"
2	Richard Blackwood	3	"1.2.3.4 Get with the Wicked", "Mama Who Da Man"
2	Ricky Martin	4	"Private Emotion", "She Bangs"
2	Ronan Keating	6	"Life Is a Rollercoaster", "The Way You Make Me Feel"
2	Samantha Mumba	5	"Body II Body", "Gotta Tell You"
2	Santana	3	"Maria Maria", "Smooth"
2	Sisqó	5	"Thong Song", "Unleash the Dragon"
2	Tom Jones	5	"Mama Told Me Not to Come", "Sex Bomb"
2	True Steppers	5	"Buggin", "Out of Your Mind"
2	Victoria Beckham ^{[R]}	6	"Holler"/"Let Love Lead the Way", "Out of Your Mind"
2	Wyclef Jean	3	"911", "It Doesn't Matter"
2	Whitney Houston	3	"Could I Have This Kiss Forever", "If I Told You That"

== Notes ==
- ^{a} "Back In My Life" re-entered the top 10 at number 10 on 1 January 2000 (week ending).
- ^{b} "Barber's Adagio for Strings" re-entered the top 10 at number 7 on 15 January 2000 (week ending) for two weeks.
- ^{c} "Steal My Sunshine" re-entered the top 10 at number 9 on 15 January 2000 (week ending) for two weeks.
- ^{d} "Imagine" was first released as a single in the UK in 1975 and made the top 10, peaking at number 6. Following John Lennon's death in December 1980, it re-entered the top 10 and spent four weeks at number one in January 1981.
- ^{e} "Don't Call Me Baby" peaked at number 30 in 1999.
- ^{f} "It Feels So Good" peaked at number 24 in 1998.
- ^{g} "The Power of Love" was first released in 1984 and spent one week at number-one It was re-released in 1993 and made the top 10 for a second time, peaking at number 10.
- ^{h} The original version of "Silence" (without Sarah McLachlan) peaked at number 73 in 1999.
- ^{i} "Operation Blade" re-entered the top 10 at number 10 on 6 January 2001 (week ending).
- ^{j} Released as the official single for Children in Need.
- ^{k} "I Put a Spell on You" peaked at number 36 in 1998.
- ^{l} Bob the Builder was voiced by Neil Morrissey.
- ^{m} "Stronger" re-entered the top 10 at number 10 on 6 January 2001 (week ending).
- ^{n} Figure includes song that peaked in 1999.
- ^{o} Figure includes appearances on Artful Dodger's "Re-Rewind" and "Woman Trouble".
- ^{p} Figure includes appearance on Dr. Dre's "Forgot About Dre".
- ^{q} Figure includes song that first charted in 1999 but peaked in 2000.
- ^{r} Figure includes a top 10 hit with the group Spice Girls.
- ^{s} Figure includes appearance on True Steppers' "Buggin".

== See also ==
- 2000 in British music
- List of number-one singles from the 2000s (UK)
