= 2000 in British music charts =

This is a summary of 2000 in music in the United Kingdom, including the official charts from that year.

2000 saw many British acts dominate the charts. The year saw how competitive the industry had become over the 1990s with numerous new releases out each week. 2000 holds the record for the most number-one singles in one particular calendar year, with 43 singles holding the number-one spot, if you include the Westlife number-one single spanning over from Christmas in 1999. The year was particularly successful for Robbie Williams, Britney Spears, Moby, Eminem, Travis and The Beatles.

== Summary ==
The Christmas number one single from 1999, a double A-side by Westlife ("I Have a Dream"/"Seasons in the Sun"), was able to retain its position at the top for the first three weeks of the year, totalling its run to four weeks at the top.

=== Female American artists ===
The year proved to be another successful one for Britney Spears who scored a second UK chart-topper early on in the year with a fourth release from her debut album, ...Baby One More Time. "Born to Make You Happy" was a special release for the European market and was received quite well, as it was a ballad, but more emotional and mature than the more innocent "Sometimes". Meanwhile, her second album, Oops!... I Did It Again proved to be a successful follow-up, but fared slightly less well than her debut. The title track topped the UK charts for a week, giving her three UK #1s in total by the end of the year. The album itself sold 21 million copies worldwide, slightly less than her debut, but was the most successful chartwise in the UK peaking at #2. The two follow-up singles from the album both hit the Top 10, "Lucky" (#5) and "Stronger" (#7). Anastacia exploded onto the music scene in 2000 with "I'm Outta Love", peaking at No. 6 and made a stronger mark with a successful No. 2 debut album, Not That Kind. Christina Aguilera followed up her chart topper from 1999 with three more singles from her eponymous debut album. Whilst "I Turn to You" barely sneaked into the Top 20, "Come On Over Baby (All I Want Is You)" hit the Top 10 and "What a Girl Wants" made the Top 3. The latter two both hit the top of the Hot 100 in the US and the former hit the Top 5 showing that both the girls were winning this race in which the media had put them, in separate areas across the globe.

Other female American artists who scored continuous success in the UK during the year were Mariah Carey, who made No. 10 with "Thank God I Found You" which became her 15th and final US No. 1 single until "We Belong Together" in 2005, Whitney Houston who topped the album charts with her double CD Greatest Hits collection celebrating 15 years of success including 4 UK #1s, Madonna who hit the top twice, the first with a cover of Don McLean's classic No. 2 hit from 1975, "American Pie" from the movie The Next Best Thing and the second being the title track from her new, chart-topping album, Music, giving her ten UK chart toppers in total and LeAnn Rimes, who hit the top of the UK charts with "Can't Fight the Moonlight", featured in the movie Coyote Ugly. Jessica Simpson also made No. 7 with "I Wanna Love You Forever" and No. 15 with "I Think I'm in Love with You". Mandy Moore made No. 6 with "Candy", which is still her biggest UK hit to date.

Less successful US solo females during 2000 in the UK were Tina Turner, who gained a Top 30 hit, which marked the last time she charted for four years; Aaliyah, who made No. 5 in the UK with her new single "Try Again", which actually topped the chart in the US, becoming the first single to reach No. 1 on the Hot 100 based solely on airplay points; and Toni Braxton, who released her album "The Heat" in April, charting at No. 3 in the UK, preceding the success of her amazing R&B anthem, He Wasn't Man Enough, which charted in more than 18 countries (No.5 in the UK).

=== Rock bands ===
2000 was an incredibly successful return to the charts for U2, who were back with a new album, All That You Can't Leave Behind, which met with great critical acclaim, the likes of which they hadn't seen since Achtung Baby. The first single, "Beautiful Day" became their fourth UK chart topper and their album quickly topped the chart in the following weeks. Folk-rock band The Corrs followed up their massive success from the previous year with a new album release, In Blue which topped the UK albums chart for four weeks and also provided the group with their first and only UK singles chart topper, "Breathless". Despite being successful in its own right, In Blue failed to match the unbeatable records set by Talk on Corners the previous year.

Coldplay are met with great critical acclaim worldwide with the release of their debut album, Parachutes. Their debut single "Shiver" made No. 35 which was a poor start, however their success quickly grew with the two follow-up singles both hitting the Top 10 ("Yellow" No. 4 and "Trouble" #10) and their album hitting the top of the chart. They were very well received in America and have been one of the few new millennium UK acts to do so. Another British act to do extremely well in the States in 2000 was Radiohead. The Oxford quintet's fourth album, Kid A, was met with mixed opinions from fans and critics alike. This was in part due to Radiohead's radical musical departure from the rock driven OK Computer, with Kid A dominated by electronica akin to that of Aphex Twin and Autechre. The fact that Kid A reached No. 1 both sides of the Atlantic was also surprising because no singles were released to promote the album. Bon Jovi also topped the UK charts with their new release, Crush, from which the first single "It's My Life" hit #3. Toploader made their debut to the UK charts with "Dancing in the Moonlight", which hits #19. Their success grew during the year, with the follow-up single hitting the Top 10 and their debut album peaking at #4. A remix of their debut single saw them inside the Top 10 at the end of the year again, which was used in adverts for the supermarket Sainsbury's.

Blink-182 kickstarted their career after their second release in 1999, their follow-up single, "All the Small Things" hit No. 2 and their debut album received moderate success peaking at No. 15 which then spanned another, this time a Top 20 hit. Oasis score their 5th No. 1 hit and their second consecutive No. 1 after their world tour with "Go Let It Out" which was taken from their new album, Standing on the Shoulder of Giants, which topped the UK charts 2 months after the single. Welsh band, the Manic Street Preachers scored their second UK No. 1 single, with a limited availability release "The Masses Against the Classes" after a successful performance at Cardiff on millennium night. R.E.M. hit the Top 3 for the very first time on the UK charts with a release from the soundtrack to the movie Man on the Moon. "The Great Beyond" continued their success in UK and Europe, but however did not help their decline in the US. The Red Hot Chili Peppers released Californication the previous year, their first album since 1995, however its success is larger during 2000, reaching a peak of No. 5, selling highly and the title track "Californication" giving them a Top 20 single. It set them on course to becoming one of the most successful rock bands in the new millennium worldwide.

=== Boybands ===
Boybands continued to be successful in the UK during 2000, just like the previous year. A1 increase their success from the previous year with their first release hitting No. 6 and scoring 2 chart toppers – "Take On Me", a cover of the 1985 No. 2 hit from Norwegian band A-ha and "Same Old Brand New You" – by the end of the year. 'N Sync's success grew over the year; after reaching a disappointing No. 34 in January, they were able to redeem themselves with 3 further hits, 2 of which made the Top 10. "Bye Bye Bye" made No. 3 and became one of their best remembered songs. The Backstreet Boys scored 3 Top 10 hits including "Show Me the Meaning of Being Lonely" and "Shape of My Heart", but were only moderately successful with their new album, in comparison to their previous release Millennium. Five also were successful, scoring their 2nd chart topper "We Will Rock You", a cover of an old Queen song that was never released as a single, but was still incredibly popular, sang with the remaining members of Queen.

However, none of these boybands were able to surpass the success levels Westlife were able to reach. Probably their most successful year since their career started in 1999 to date; they scored a further 3 chart topping singles. "Fool Again" made them the first act to have their first 5 singles enter at No. 1 breaking the record set by B*Witched the previous year, "Against All Odds (Take a Look at Me Now)", a collaboration with US singer Mariah Carey and a re-working of the 1984 No. 2 hit from Phil Collins made them the first act to have their first 6 singles enter at No. 1 and finally "My Love" made them the first act to have their first 7 singles make No. 1, have their first 7 singles enter at No. 1 and also equal the Beatles's record of 7 consecutive No. 1 singles. Their run was broken when their Christmas release "What Makes A Man" only made #2. Their 2nd album, "Coast To Coast" became their first No. 1 on the UK albums chart.

=== Girl groups ===
Girl groups were slightly more successful than the previous year, but still failed to have the impact they made in the late 1990s when groups like the Spice Girls were in their peak of fame. Still, the All Saints made a return to the music scene with their 2nd album Saints & Sinners, which not only topped the UK charts, but also produced two No. 1 singles: "Pure Shores" which was taken from the soundtrack to The Beach starring Leonardo DiCaprio and "Black Coffee". One last release which made No. 7 in 2001 became their last release before they split and pursued solo careers, but they left successfully with a total of 5 UK chart toppers.

Both B*Witched and the Spice Girls released their last singles in the UK this year. B*Witched's career had been heading in a downward spiral ever since the release of their second album Awake And Breathe in 1999. Their last single release was "Jump Down" which made No. 16, and as a result, they cancelled the plans for a 3rd album and eventually split two years later officially. The Spice Girls, charted in Christmas 1998 at number one with Goodbye, and they score one final chart topper with "Holler/Let Love Lead The Way" in 2000, equalling ABBA's total of 9. The latter track was a turn in a more urban direction that any of their previous singles, whereas the former was a classic Spice Girls love ballad. Now much into decline, this marked their final time to chart, however their 3rd album was much more successful in the UK than predicted, peaking at No. 2 in the albums chart. They left, however, with 9 UK #1's out of 10 released singles; a very impressive chart feat. They also won the coveted 'Outstanding Contribution To Music' award at the Brits for their massive record sales and impact on popular culture.

One of the most successful girl groups of the year were Destiny's Child whose success grew massively over the year. "Say My Name" and "Jumpin' Jumpin'" quickly became Top 5 hits for the group; however they scored their first UK No. 1 with "Independent Woman" – was at No. 1 in the US for 11 weeks – taken from the soundtrack to the new hit film Charlie's Angels. Their success was to continue to grow over the next year.

English girl group Sugababes scored their first hit single with "Overload'" which peaked at number 6. Their debut album produced three more Top 40 hits.

=== Other female artists ===
British female singers achieved respectable success, but were somewhat eclipsed by American females during the year. In January, Gabrielle topped both the singles chart and the albums chart. Her new release Rise topped the charts (it failed to make the Top 20 upon initial release in 1999) and the title track became her first No. 1 single since her debut shot to the top 7 years ago. She followed up her two-week No. 1 single with an additional Top 10 hit and a further Top 20 hit. She was able to continue successfully into the new millennium.

Other British females to achieve success were Billie Piper who scored a third UK No. 1 with new release "Day & Night", following her two chart toppers from 1998, British DJ and singer, Sonique who scored a chart topper with a re-issue of her No. 24 hit from 1998, "It Feels So Good" after massive sales in the US and followed it up with a No. 2 hit, "Sky" and Irish singer, Samantha Mumba who kickstarted her career with her debut single "Gotta Tell You" peaking at No. 2, her follow-up hitting the Top 5 and her debut album settling in the Top 20.

Geri Halliwell and Melanie C were the only two Spice Girls to receive notable success throughout the year. The former scored a 3rd consecutive chart topper, "Bag It Up" which was the 4th single to be taken from her debut album, Schizophonic. The latter hit the top twice, initially with "Never Be The Same Again", a duet with TLC member, Lisa "Left Eye" Lopes and "I Turn to You", which was a respectable hit in the dance charts in the US and even managed to chart on the Hot 100. Northern Star had also proved itself as a very successful debut album, selling 3 million copies worldwide and achieving triple platinum status in the UK alone. Victoria Beckham, however, achieved a No. 2 single being featured on Truesteppers's new release "Out Of Your Mind", which was kept off the top spot by Spiller's single, "Groovejet (If This Ain't Love)", which receive considerable media attention placing Victoria in rivalry with the female vocalist featured on Spiller's track, Sophie Ellis-Bextor.

Australian superstar Kylie Minogue came back to the music industry with "Spinning Around", co-written by Paula Abdul. It became her first UK No. 1 in 10 years and set her on course for an even more successful career during the upcoming years. Her new album Light Years hit No. 2 as well as her follow-up single "On a Night Like This". Canadian country star Shania Twain hits No. 5 with a final release from her multi-platinum Come On Over in the early part of the year and due to its massive success her 1995 album, The Woman in Me was re-issued in the UK and hit #9. Jennifer Lopez's debut album On the 6 spawned a fourth single which charted on the UK charts within the top twenty titled, Feelin' So Good featuring Big Pun and Fat Joe, the former who died shortly before release becoming a tribute to him. The album spent a short time in the top 75 this year before leaving the charts.

=== Dance acts ===
Dance acts received massive success throughout the year, and represented 37% of the total singles sales of the year, making it the most popular genre of the year. Sash! scored a fifth No. 2 hit, making him the act with the most No. 2 hits in the UK without ever having made #1. The most successful track was probably "Toca's Miracle" by Fragma. Fusing their own track "Toca Me", with Coco's "I Need a Miracle", they created one of the few No. 1 singles in the year to spend more than one week at the summit.

Many acts who were very successful in 1999 continued successfully through 2000, but their success dropped slightly. ATB who topped the chart the previous year followed up with a Top 5 hit, however he had hit the Top 3 in between this release and his No. 1, "9 p.m. (Till I Come)". The Vengaboys only made No. 9 with their second album release and after scoring 1 Top 5, 1 Top 10 and 1 Top 20 hit, they charted once more in February of the following year before leaving the music industry. Eiffel 65 hit No. 3 with "Move Your Body", freeing them from one-hit wonder status. Their album Europop hit No. 12 and became a moderate success worldwide. "Blue (Da Ba Dee)" finally left the charts very early in the year, completing its millionth sale in the early parts of the year also. Notable for their most successful single in their career until 2013, Daft Punk hit No. 2 with "One More Time", a release from their second album Discovery.

There were some number-one songs from Black Legend, Chicane, Fragma, Madison Avenue, Modjo, Oxide & Neutrino, Sonique, Spiller and a lot of other successful singles from the likes of Artful Dodger, DJ Luck & MC Neat, Darude, Bomfunk MC's, Zombie Nation, Hi-Gate, York, Paul Van Dyk, Moloko, Sweet Female Attitude, Bob Sinclar, Des Mitchell, Alice Deejay, Rank 1, Watergate, Southside Spinners, B-15 Project, Aurora, Lonyo, Architechs, Public Domain, Joey Negro, Storm, Delerium, Element Four, Fatboy Slim, Moby, and others.

=== 'Quality' of number ones ===
Chart critics have complained that after the 1990s, a very successful decade in music for sales and chart records, the early 2000s decimated the music industry due to illegal downloads with the birth of Napster, especially the singles chart. Singles spent less time at the summit with the turn of the new millennium and sales also began to considerably drop. 2000 was an excellent example of this, being the year that still holds the record for most No. 1 singles in a calendar year (43) and also contains the longest run of consecutive one-week No. 1 singles. Between the week ending 24 June 2000 and the week ending 16 September 2000, each week saw a new single hit No. 1 in the UK, a run of 13 #1s. The run began with Black Legend hitting the top with a re-working of an old Barry White classic, "You See the Trouble with Me". It was brought to an end by French house music act Modjo who hit No. 1 for two weeks with their debut single "Lady (Hear Me Tonight)". As for sales, they were to steadily decline over the next few years, and 2000 was a slight turning point showing signs of weakening, with only one million-seller, which compared to the 1990s was a poor turnout. Weekly sales for #1s tended to remain around the 110,000 bracket, with the exception of a few extremes. An example of a very average week would have been when Madison Avenue's "Don't Call Me Baby" hit No. 1 and sold 93,000 copies. Single sales reached a low in 2004, before the legal paid digital download revitalised the market and by the end of the decade, they were at their highest selling level ever.

=== Pop acts ===
S Club 7 continued successfully from the previous year, topping the albums chart for the first time with their second release 7. On the singles chart, they scored two Top 3 hits and a chart topper with their Christmas release "Never Had a Dream Come True". Steps are also successful; they scored a 2nd chart topper "Stomp" along with two Top 5 hits and their new album, Buzz hit #4.

Female duo Daphne & Celeste made their chart debut with the hilarious "Ooh Stick You" which peaked at #8. They followed up their debut with two Top 20 hits and then never charted again. Aqua made a return to the Top 10 of the UK charts, however their new album was much less successful and their follow-up was only a minimal Top 30 hit.

Pop acts were ultimately making a transition from the 1990s when very basic pop ruled the charts. The start of a new decade saw a stronger liking towards new genres of music such as hip hop and R'N'B. However, this particular year still saw plenty of pop acts rule the chart, and it would be the strongest year of the decade for the genre.

=== A Year of hip hop ===
Rap proved to be a successful genre in 2000; something that would continue well into the decade. Dr. Dre made the Top 10 of the UK charts with "Still D.R.E." for the first time since his chart debut in 1994. By far the most successful rapper of the year was Eminem. He accumulated his first two of many chart toppers with singles "The Real Slim Shady" and "Stan". The latter – telling the story of an obsessive fan who ends up committing suicide – featured female singer Dido and brought around so much interest in her that her album No Angel was re-issued and subsequently topped the chart. The Marshall Mathers LP, Eminem's second album from which these two singles plus another Top 10 hit for him were taken from, also topped the charts. The album also went on to being one of the best selling of the decade.

=== Successful solo males ===
Solo males from a range of musical genres were successful throughout the year 2000 in the UK. Ian Brown started off 2000 just as he did 1998 when he made his debut; his first hit of the year peaked at #5. The only difference was by 2000 he had established himself as a successful solo artist. He scored a Top 30 hit and did not chart otherwise during the year. David Gray kickstarted a very successful music career hitting No. 5 with his debut single "Babylon" and his debut album White Ladder finally reaching the top of the charts after a 64-week climb. The album is a great success, selling over 2.6 million copies and placing 18th in the top-selling albums of all-time in the UK.

Two males started their careers early in the year, but by the end their success had mostly dissolved. Stephen Gately, ex-Boyzone member, made No. 3 with his debut solo release, which was a good start, however his debut album peaked at No. 9 and his follow-up single only made No. 11, putting him in a quick downward spiral. Richard Blackwood suffered a similar defeat with his debut reaching the same position, however his follow-up releases were not as successful and his album achieved only minimal sales.

Showing the cultural diversity of successful male artists in the UK, Mexican rock and roll guitarist, Carlos Santana scored a No. 3 hit with "Smooth" – 12-week No. 1 in the US – and a No. 6 hit with his follow-up single "Maria Maria" – 10-week No. 1 in the US – which were both taken from his most successful album Supernatural which topped the charts in the UK as well as the US. His Ultimate Collection was also released in 2000, reaching #12.

After fronting Artful Dodger's No. 2 Christmas hit of 1999, Craig David started a very successful solo career. His first two singles, "7 Days" and "Fill Me In", both topped the charts as well as his debut album, Born to Do It. He did not continue this streak throughout the year though as his Christmas release peaked at #3. Tom Jones continues to have success with his chart-topping album Reload when "Sexbomb" and "Mama Told Me Not To Come" – the latter being a duet with the Stereophonics – both became Top 5 hits for the legendary star.

Probably the most successful solo male artists of the year were Robbie Williams and Ronan Keating. The former scored a third UK chart topper with his new single "Rock DJ", however the very popular collaboration with Kylie Minogue "Kids" stalled at No. 2 despite spending 15 weeks inside the UK Top 40. His album Sing When You're Winning topped the charts for 3 weeks. The latter's second single "Life Is A Rollercoaster" became another chart topper for the Irish star and his eponymous debut album also hit the top of the charts. His Christmas release was unable to match the success he achieved in the middle of the year, peaking at a mere #6.

=== Christmas number one ===
The Christmas number-one single had many artists in competition to be the first Christmas No. 1 of the new millennium. Robbie Williams, Ronan Keating, Madonna, Craig David and Westlife all released singles desiring to be the new Christmas #1. However, they were all beaten by a special novelty release that captured the hearts of many fans across the festive season. "Can We Fix It?" by Bob the Builder became 2000's Christmas No. 1 single and quickly became the biggest selling single of the year. He had become very popular through his successful television series and this was the start of a very short lived, but moderately successful singing career. He destroyed the run of consecutive No. 1 singles of Westlife, ending it at 7, keeping "What Makes A Man" at #2.

Reigning supreme at the top of the albums chart for nine consecutive weeks with their 15th No. 1 album were The Beatles with their latest greatest hits release 1, the Christmas number-one album of 2000. The album comprised all their UK and US No. 1 singles, totalling to 27 different singles. It became the fastest selling album of all time across the world and also in the UK, and also debuted at No. 1 in various countries, including the UK, despite the fact that they had not played together for over 30 years. It eventually went on to sell 2.1 million copies in Britain, becoming one of the top selling albums.

== Classical music ==
The major event of the classical music year was the launch of the Faenol Festival in North Wales by opera singer Bryn Terfel. The festival programme included popular music as well as classical and opera. In its first year, the festival performers included Michael Ball. The Proms season was notable for being the year in which Sir Andrew Davis ended his run as conductor of the BBC Symphony Orchestra, subsequently to become musical director of the Lyric Opera of Chicago. Composer Peter Maxwell Davies spent the year as Artist in Residence at the Barossa Music Festival, and produced several new works. A major new work by Karl Jenkins, The Armed Man: a Mass for Peace, was premièred on 25 April at the Royal Albert Hall, and quickly became one of the most popular and recognisable works in the classical repertoire. The most notable new opera of the year was Mark-Anthony Turnage's The Silver Tassie

== Charts ==
=== Number-one singles ===
Chart date (week ending)	Song	Artist(s)	Sales
1 January	"I Have a Dream" / "Seasons in the Sun"	Westlife	231,000
8 January	"I Have a Dream" / "Seasons in the Sun"	Westlife	34,500
15 January	"I Have a Dream" / "Seasons in the Sun"	Westlife	34,738
22 January	"The Masses Against the Classes"	Manic Street Preachers	76,000
29 January	"Born to Make You Happy"	Britney Spears	91,000
5 February	"Rise"	Gabrielle	77,501
12 February	"Rise"	Gabrielle	85,500
19 February	"Go Let It Out"	Oasis	180,000
26 February	"Pure Shores"	All Saints	199,084
4 March	"Pure Shores"	All Saints	154,000
11 March	"American Pie"	Madonna	139,000
18 March	"Don't Give Up"	Chicane with Bryan Adams	74,470
25 March	"Bag It Up"	Geri Halliwell	106,000
1 April	"Never Be the Same Again"	Melanie C featuring Lisa "Left Eye" Lopes	144,500
8 April	"Fool Again"	Westlife	82,772
15 April	"Fill Me In"	Craig David	165,000
22 April	"Toca's Miracle"	Fragma	187,859
29 April	"Toca's Miracle"	Fragma	116,000
6 May	"Bound 4 Da Reload (Casualty)"	Oxide & Neutrino	70,700
13 May	"Oops!... I Did It Again"	Britney Spears	124,000
20 May	"Don't Call Me Baby"	Madison Avenue	93,000
27 May	"Day & Night"	Billie Piper	104,000
3 June	"It Feels So Good"	Sonique	195,306
10 June	"It Feels So Good"	Sonique	109,000
17 June	"It Feels So Good"	Sonique	85,000
24 June	"You See the Trouble with Me"	Black Legend	81,500
1 July	"Spinning Around"	Kylie Minogue	82,000
8 July	"The Real Slim Shady"	Eminem	86,000
15 July	"Breathless"	The Corrs	80,869
22 July	"Life Is a Rollercoaster"	Ronan Keating	94,400
29 July	"We Will Rock You"	Five and Queen	77,500
5 August	"7 Days"	Craig David	149,000
12 August	"Rock DJ"	Robbie Williams	199,307
19 August	"I Turn to You"	Melanie C	121,000
26 August	"Groovejet (If This Ain't Love)"	Spiller featuring Sophie Ellis-Bextor	202,600
2 September	"Music"	Madonna	115,000
9 September	"Take On Me"	A1	82,000
16 September	"Lady (Hear Me Tonight)"	Modjo	89,050
23 September	"Lady (Hear Me Tonight)"	Modjo	109,000
30 September	"Against All Odds"	Mariah Carey featuring Westlife	110,430
7 October	"Against All Odds"	Mariah Carey featuring Westlife	97,060
14 October	"Black Coffee"	All Saints	88,940
21 October	"Beautiful Day"	U2	65,471
28 October	"Stomp"	Steps	48,000
4 November	"Holler" / "Let Love Lead the Way"	Spice Girls	106,000
11 November	"My Love"	Westlife	112,252
18 November	"Same Old Brand New You"	A1	60,500
25 November	"Can't Fight the Moonlight"	LeAnn Rimes	113,500
2 December	"Independent Women Part 1"	Destiny's Child	109,000
9 December	"Never Had a Dream Come True"	S Club 7	144,000
16 December	"Stan"	Eminem featuring Dido	202,900
23 December	"Can We Fix It?"	Bob the Builder	215,000
30 December	"Can We Fix It?"	Bob the Builder	360,000

=== Number-one albums ===
Chart date (week ending)	Album	Artist	Sales
1 January	Come on Over	Shania Twain	239,559
8 January	Come on Over	Shania Twain	72,000
15 January	The Man Who	Travis	47,600
22 January	The Man Who	Travis	40,000
29 January	The Man Who	Travis	42,500
5 February	The Man Who	Travis	38,000
12 February	The Man Who	Travis	39,400
19 February	Rise	Gabrielle	57,000
26 February	Rise	Gabrielle	49,000
4 March	Rise	Gabrielle	39,000
11 March	Standing on the Shoulder of Giants	Oasis	311,265
18 March	The Man Who	Travis	78,000
25 March	The Man Who	Travis	48,000
1 April	Supernatural	Santana	42,000
8 April	Supernatural	Santana	54,000
15 April	Play	Moby	49,000
22 April	Play	Moby	49,000
29 April	Play	Moby	48,000
6 May	Play	Moby	37,500
13 May	Play	Moby	31,000
20 May	Reload	Tom Jones	33,662
27 May	Whitney: The Greatest Hits	Whitney Houston	89,000
3 June	Whitney: The Greatest Hits	Whitney Houston	80,000
10 June	Crush	Bon Jovi	84,000
17 June	Reload	Tom Jones	54,000
24 June	7	S Club 7	73,000
1 July	The Marshall Mathers LP	Eminem	46,000
8 July	Alone with Everybody	Richard Ashcroft	75,000
15 July	The Marshall Mathers LP	Eminem	70,000
22 July	Parachutes	Coldplay	70,935
29 July	In Blue	The Corrs	154,000
5 August	In Blue	The Corrs	91,000
12 August	Ronan	Ronan Keating	176,000
19 August	Ronan	Ronan Keating	99,000
26 August	Born to Do It	Craig David	225,320
2 September	Born to Do It	Craig David	123,000
9 September	Sing When You're Winning	Robbie Williams	313,585
16 September	Sing When You're Winning	Robbie Williams	119,500
23 September	Sing When You're Winning	Robbie Williams	60,000
30 September	Music	Madonna	152,000
7 October	Music	Madonna	84,000
14 October	Kid A	Radiohead	131,500
21 October	Kid A	Radiohead	42,000
28 October	Saints & Sinners	All Saints	84,000
4 November	The Greatest Hits	Texas	147,000
11 November	All That You Can't Leave Behind	U2	164,000
18 November	Coast to Coast	Westlife	234,767
25 November	1	The Beatles	319,126
2 December	1	The Beatles	253,500
9 December	1	The Beatles	232,000
16 December	1	The Beatles	251,000
23 December	1	The Beatles	283,000
30 December	1	The Beatles	422,042

=== Number-one compilation albums ===
Chart date (week ending)	Album
1 January	Now 44
8 January	Now 44
15 January	Now 44
22 January	Now 44
29 January	Clubber's Guide to...2000
5 February	Clubber's Guide to...2000
12 February	Agia Napa – Fantasy Island
19 February	The Love Songs Album
26 February	Rewind – The Sound of UK Garage
4 March	The Beach
11 March	The Beach
18 March	The Beach
25 March	New Hits 2000
1 April	New Hits 2000
8 April	New Woman 2000
15 April	Dance Nation – Tall Paul & Brandon Block
22 April	Girls 2K
29 April	Now 45
6 May	Now 45
13 May	Now 45
20 May	Now 45
27 May	Now 45
3 June	Now 45
10 June	Clubber's Guide to...Ibiza – Summer 2000
17 June	Top of the Pops 2000 – Volume 2
24 June	Club Mix Ibiza 2000
1 July	Club Mix Ibiza 2000
8 July	Club Mix Ibiza 2000
15 July	Fresh Hits – Volume 1
22 July	Fresh Hits – Volume 1
29 July	Kiss Clublife Summer 2000
5 August	Now 46
12 August	Now 46
19 August	Now 46
26 August	Now 46
2 September	The Ibiza Annual – Summer 2000
9 September	The Ibiza Annual – Summer 2000
16 September	The Ibiza Annual – Summer 2000
23 September	Kiss Ibiza 2000
30 September	Kiss Ibiza 2000
7 October	Trance Nation 4
14 October	Trance Nation 4
21 October	Trance Nation 4
28 October	Clubmix 2000
4 November	Now Dance 2001
11 November	The Annual 2000
18 November	The Annual 2000
25 November	Cream Anthems 2001
2 December	Now 47
9 December	Now 47
16 December	Now 47
23 December	Now 47
30 December	Now 47

== Year-end charts ==
Data based on sales from 2 January to 30 December 2000.

=== Best-selling singles ===
No.	Title	Artist	Peak position	Sales
1	"Can We Fix It?"	Bob the Builder	1	853,151
2	"Pure Shores"	All Saints	1	685,343
3	"It Feels So Good" (remix)	Sonique	1	642,001
4	"Who Let the Dogs Out?"	Baha Men	2	617,576
5	"Rock DJ"	Robbie Williams	1	578,092
6	"Stan"	Eminem featuring Dido	1	544,380
7	"Toca's Miracle"	Fragma	1	530,742
8	"Groovejet (If This Ain't Love)"	Spiller featuring Sophie Ellis-Bextor	1	523,242
9	"Never Had a Dream Come True"	S Club 7	1	491,948
10	"Fill Me In"	Craig David	1	480,106
11	"Reach"	S Club 7	2	
12	"Can't Fight the Moonlight"	LeAnn Rimes	1	
13	"Rise"	Gabrielle	1	
14	"The Real Slim Shady"	Eminem	1	
15	"Oops!... I Did It Again"	Britney Spears	1	
16	"Lady (Hear Me Tonight)"	Modjo	1	
17	"7 Days"	Craig David	1	
18	"Never Be the Same Again"	Melanie C featuring 'Left Eye' Lopes	1	
19	"American Pie"	Madonna	1	
20	"The Bad Touch"	Bloodhound Gang	4	
21	"Out of Your Mind"	Truesteppers and Dane Bowers featuring Victoria Beckham	2	
22	"Life Is a Rollercoaster"	Ronan Keating	1	
23	"Freestyler"	Bomfunk MCs	2	
24	"Music"	Madonna	1	
25	"Independent Women (Part 1)"	Destiny's Child	1	
26	"Sandstorm"	Darude	3	
27	"I Turn to You" (remix)	Melanie C	1	
28	"Against All Odds"	Mariah Carey featuring Westlife	1	
29	"Thong Song"	Sisqó	3	
30	"Movin' Too Fast"	Artful Dodger featuring Romina Johnson	2	
31	"Don't Call Me Baby"	Madison Avenue	1	
32	"Born to Make You Happy"	Britney Spears	1	
33	"Breathless"	The Corrs	1	
34	"Number One"	Tweenies	5	
35	"My Love"	Westlife	1	
36	"Go Let It Out"	Oasis	1	280,000
37	"Flowers"	Sweet Female Attitude	2	
38	"Kernkraft 400"	Zombie Nation	2	
39	"What Makes a Man"	Westlife	2	
40	"You See the Trouble with Me"	Black Legend	1	
41	"Don't Give Up"	Chicane featuring Bryan Adams	1	
42	"Bag It Up"	Geri Halliwell	1	
43	"Operation Blade (Bass in the Place)"	Public Domain	5	
44	"Take a Look Around (Theme from MI:2)"	Limp Bizkit	3	
45	"We Will Rock You"	Five + Queen	1	
46	"Spinning Around"	Kylie Minogue	1	
47	"Day & Night"	Billie Piper	1	
48	"Shackles (Praise You)"	Mary Mary	5	
49	"Sitting Down Here"	Lene Marlin	5	
50	"Gotta Tell You"	Samantha Mumba	2	

=== Best-selling albums ===
No.	Title	Artist	Peak position	Sales
1	1	The Beatles	1	1,849,407
2	Sing When You're Winning	Robbie Williams	1	1,600,000
3	The Marshall Mathers LP	Eminem	1	1,585,000
4	Coast to Coast	Westlife	1	1,374,000
5	Play	Moby	1	1,333,000
6	Born to Do It	Craig David	1	1,330,000
7	The Greatest Hits	Texas	1	1,162,000
8	Parachutes	Coldplay	1	1,104,000
9	Whitney: The Greatest Hits	Whitney Houston	1	
10	Music	Madonna	1	
11	White Ladder	David Gray	2 (Note: Reached number 1 in 2001)	1,020,000
12	Ronan	Ronan Keating	1	1,000,000
13	Reload	Tom Jones	1	
14	The Man Who	Travis	1	
15	Rise	Gabrielle	1	
16	In Blue	The Corrs	1	
17	7	S Club 7	1	
18	Supernatural	Santana	1	
19	Oops!... I Did It Again	Britney Spears	2	
20	Come On Over	Shania Twain	1	
21	Affirmation	Savage Garden	7	
22	The Writing's on the Wall	Destiny's Child	10	630,000
23	The Collection	Barry White	6 (Note: Reached number 5 in 1988)	
24	Northern Star	Melanie C	4	560,000
25	Onka's Big Moka	Toploader	5 (Note: Reached number 4 in 2001)	550,000
26	Standing on the Shoulder of Giants	Oasis	1	
27	Buzz	Steps	4	
28	On How Life Is	Macy Gray	3	540,000
29	Saints & Sinners	All Saints	1	
30	All That You Can't Leave Behind	U2	1	
31	The 50 Greatest Hits	Elvis Presley	8	
32	Westlife	Westlife	3 (Note: Reached number 1 in 1999)	
33	The Voice	Russell Watson	5	450,000
34	Blur: The Best of	Blur	3	
35	A Day Without Rain	Enya	6	
36	...Baby One More Time	Britney Spears	2	
37	The Very Best of UB40 1980–2000	UB40	7	
38	Crush	Bon Jovi	1	
39	2001	Dr. Dre	4	
40	Californication	Red Hot Chili Peppers	9 (Note: Reached number 5 in 1999)	
41	Gold: Greatest Hits	ABBA	7 (Note: Reached number 1 in 1992)	
42	Hear My Cry	Sonique	6	340,000
43	Elton John One Night Only – The Greatest Hits	Elton John	7	
44	The Slim Shady LP	Eminem	10	
45	Steptacular	Steps	9 (Note: Reached number 1 in 1999)	
46	Alone with Everybody	Richard Ashcroft	1	
47	Performance and Cocktails	Stereophonics	7 (Note: Reached number 1 in 1999)	
48	The Whole Story: His Greatest Hits	Cliff Richard	6	
49	Brand New Day	Sting	11 (Note: Reached number 5 in 1999)	
50	Kid A	Radiohead	1	

=== Best-selling compilation albums ===
No.	Title	Peak position	Sales
1	Now 47	1	1,210,000
2	Now 46	1	736,000
3	Now 45	1	674,000
4	Now Dance 2001	1	314,000
5	The Annual 2000	1	307,000
6	The Ibiza Annual – Summer 2000	1	
7	Pure Garage	2	
8	Cream Anthems 2001	1	
9	Now! The Christmas Album	2	236,000
10	Club Mix Ibiza 2000	1	

== See also ==
- List of UK Dance Singles Chart number ones of 2000
- List of UK Independent Singles Chart number ones of 2000
