= Rarewerks =

Compilation album by Astralwerks Artists
- Released: January 23, 2001
- Genre: Progressive house
- Length: 75:04
- Label: Astralwerks Records

Professional ratings
Review scores
Source	Rating
Allmusic	link
Pitchfork Media	6.6/10 link

Rarewerks is a collection of rare and previously unreleased songs by various artists on the Astralwerks electronic music record label.

== Track listing ==
1. Fatboy Slim - "How Can You Hear Us?" – 5:08
2. Primal Scream - "Exterminator" (Massive Attack Remix) – 5:09
3. Q-Burns Abstract Message - "Feng Shui" Groove Armada's Lost in Space Remix) – 5:47
4. Air - "Casanova '70" (The Secret of Cool Brendan Lynch Remix) – 5:31
5. Cassius - "Foxxy" (Cassius Remix) – 7:57
6. Scanty Sandwich - "This One" – 7:35
7. The Chemical Brothers – "Out of Control" (Sasha Instrumental Mix) - 13:22
8. Photek - "DNA" – 5:45
9. Basement Jaxx - "Bingo Bango" (David Morales Latin Dub Mix) – 7:46
10. The Beta Band - "To You Alone" – 4:50
11. The Future Sound of London - "Live in New York" – 6:14
