= List of UK Independent Singles Chart number ones of 2000 =

These are the Official Charts Company UK Official Indie Chart number one hits of 2000.

Issue date	Song	Artist
1 January	"Say You'll Be Mine"/"Better the Devil You Know"	Steps
8 January	"Say You'll Be Mine"/"Better the Devil You Know"	Steps
15 January	"Say You'll Be Mine"/"Better the Devil You Know"	Steps
22 January	"Rainbow Country"	Bob Marley vs. Funkstar De Luxe
29 January ^{[a]}	"Born to Make You Happy"	Britney Spears
5 February	"Born to Make You Happy"	Britney Spears
12 February	"Born to Make You Happy"	Britney Spears
19 February	"Go Let It Out"	Oasis
26 February	"Go Let It Out"	Oasis
4 March	"Movin' Too Fast"	Artful Dodger
11 March	"Movin' Too Fast"	Artful Dodger
18 March	"Mama Told Me Not to Come"	Tom Jones and Stereophonics
25 March	"Mama Told Me Not to Come"	Tom Jones and Stereophonics
1 April	"The Time Is Now"	Moloko
8 April	"The Time Is Now"	Moloko
15 April	"Blow Ya Mind"	Lock 'n' Load
22 April	"Blow Ya Mind"	Lock 'n' Load
29 April	"Who Feels Love?"	Oasis
6 May	"Blow Your Mind"	Lock "n" Load
13 May ^{[a]}	"Oops!... I Did It Again"	Britney Spears
20 May	"Oops!... I Did It Again"	Britney Spears
27 May	"Oops!... I Did It Again"	Britney Spears
3 June	"Oops!... I Did It Again"	Britney Spears
10 June	"Oops!... I Did It Again"	Britney Spears
17 June	"Unintended"	Muse
24 June	"Sandstorm"	Darude
1 July	"Sandstorm"	Darude
8 July	"Sandstorm"	Darude
15 July	"Sunday Morning Call"	Oasis
22 July	"Sandstorm"	Darude
29 July	"Sing-A-Long"	Shanks & Bigfoot
5 August	"Sandstorm"	Darude
12 August	"Battle"	Wookie featuring Lain
19 August	"Battle"	Wookie featuring Lain
26 August	"Lucky"	Britney Spears
2 September	"Lucky"	Britney Spears
9 September	"Lucky"	Britney Spears
16 September	"Bullet in the Gun 2000"	Planet Perfecto
23 September	"Bullet in the Gun 2000"	Planet Perfecto
30 September	"Ubik"	Timo Maas
7 October	"You Take My Breath Away"	SuReal
14 October	"Silence"	Delerium featuring Sarah McLachlan
21 October	"Silence"	Delerium featuring Sarah McLachlan
28 October	"Silence"	Delerium featuring Sarah McLachlan
4 November	"Who Let the Dogs Out"	Baha Men
11 November	"Who Let the Dogs Out"	Baha Men
18 November	"Shape of My Heart"	Backstreet Boys
25 November	"Feel the Beat"	Darude
2 December	"Who Let the Dogs Out"	Baha Men
9 December	"Who Let the Dogs Out"	Baha Men
16 December ^{[a]}	"Can We Fix It?"	Bob The Builder
23 December ^{[a]}	"Can We Fix It?"	Bob The Builder
30 December ^{[a]}	"Can We Fix It?"	Bob The Builder

== Notes ==
- ^{a} – The single was simultaneously number-one on the singles chart.

== See also ==
- 2000 in music
