= Paul Masterson =

Yomanda
- Also known as: See Production aliases
- Born: Paul Kevin Masterson
- Genres: House, dance, trance
- Years active: 1995–present
- Labels: Manifesto, Incentive, Virgin, VC Recordings

Paul Kevin Masterson is a Northern Irish DJ and record producer, originally from Belfast and now living in London. A prominent figure in the British dance music scene of the late 1990s and early 2000s, Masterson is noted for his prolific output under numerous recording aliases, achieving chart success in genres including Hi-NRG, house, and trance.

He is best known for recording as Yomanda, under which alias he scored a UK top 10 hit with "Synth and Strings" in 1999. However, Masterson also achieved significant commercial success with several other projects. As Amen! UK, he released the 1995 Hi-NRG anthem "Passion", and as Candy Girls, he reached the charts with "Wham Bam" and "Fe Fi Fo Fum".

In addition to his solo work, Masterson is one half of the trance duo Hi-Gate, along with BBC Radio 1 DJ Judge Jules. The pair released the album Split Personality in 2003 and achieved a UK top 10 single with "Pitchin' (In Every Direction)". Over the course of his career, Masterson has produced or remixed dozens of tracks that have entered the UK Singles Chart.

== Biography ==
Recording as Amen! UK, he had a hi-NRG hit with "Passion", released by Deconstruction Records in 1995. Billboard magazine described it as being "underlined by an intangible but apparent reverence for hi-NRG architects, such as the late Patrick Cowley", praising the track's "crazy-catchy chorus" while slightly criticizing the lack of "meaty" lyrics otherwise.

As Paul Masterson presents Sushi, he had another hit with "The Earthshaker" in 2002. He has used various recording aliases since 1995, which are listed below. In the United States, his best known production along with Rachel Auburn, Candy Girls (which featured an American lead vocalist, Sweet Pussy Pauline), reached number 7 on Billboard's Dance Club Songs chart with "Wham Bam" in 1996.

He has also worked with Judge Jules, most notably billed as Hi-Gate.

== Production aliases ==
- Amen! UK / Amen!
- Candy Girls
- Celine Diablo
- Clergy
- Dorothy
- Erotixs
- Hi-Gate
- Paul Masterson
- Sleazesisters / Sleaze Sisters
- Subway
- Succargo
- Sushi
- VPL
- Wand
- Working Class Hero
- Yomanda

== Discography ==
=== Singles ===
- "Synth and Strings" (Yomanda) (1999) – UK No. 8
- "Sunshine" (Yomanda) (2000) – UK No. 16
- "On the Level" (Yomanda) (2000) – UK No. 28
- "You're Free" (Yomanda) (2003) – UK No. 22
- "Got the Chance" (Yomanda vs Uto)
- "Kaminari" (Yomanda vs Uto)
- "Passion" (Amen! UK) (1997) – UK No. 15
- "People of Love" (Amen! UK) (1997) – UK No. 36
- "Passion" (Amen! UK) (2003) – UK No. 40
- "The Earthshaker" (Paul Masterson presents Sushi) (2002) – UK No. 35
- "Stars" (Paul Masterson)
- "What U Got, What You Do" (Paul Masterson presents Subway)
- "Pullin For 2" (Paul Masterson presents Subway)
- "Pitchin' (In Every Direction)" (Hi-Gate) (2000) – UK No. 6
- "I Can Hear Voices" / "Caned and Unable" (Hi-Gate) (2000) – UK No. 12
- "Gonna Work It Out" (Hi-Gate) (2001) – UK No. 25
- "Mayhem in Miami" (Paul Masterson and BK)
- "Saints & Sinners" (Clergy)
- "The Oboe Song" (Clergy) (2002) – UK No. 50
- "The Bassline" (VPL)
- "T-Break" (VPL)
- "Sex" (Sleazesisters with Vikki Shepard) (1995) – UK No. 53
- Let's Whip It Up (You Go Girl)" (Sleazesisters with Vikki Shepard) (1996) – UK No. 46
- "Work It Up" (Sleaze Sisters) (1998) – UK No. 74
- "Fe Fi Fo Fum" (Candy Girls featuring Sweet Pussy Pauline) (1995) – UK No. 23
- "Wham Bam" (Candy Girls featuring Sweet Pussy Pauline) (1996) – UK No. 20
- "I Want Candy" (Candy Girls featuring Valerie Malcolm) – UK No. 30
- "What's That Tune (Doo Doo Doo Doo Doo-Doo-Doo-Doo-Doo-Doo) (Dorothy) (1995) – UK No. 31
- "Good To Love You" (PM Project with Sharon Woolf) (limited white label)
- "The Sound" (Yomtrax)

=== Co production ===
- "Hi-Gate" (with Judge Jules) (albums)
  - 2003 Split Personality
- "VPL" (with Judge Jules) (singles)
  - 2001 "The Bassline"
  - 2002 "T Break"
  - 2003 "Bass Trouble"
  - 2003 "In The Park"
  - 2003 "It's Showtime"
