= Sweet Pussy Pauline =

American singer

Sweet Pussy Pauline (real name Candice Jordan) is an American vocalist.

She is known for having two top 25 UK hit singles in collaboration with Candy Girls, a top 10 hit on the US Dance chart, and numerous other underground releases both under this name and the pseudonym Candy J.

== Discography ==
=== Singles ===
Title	Year	Peak chart positions		
Title	Year	UK	US Dance	UK Dance
"Why Are You Wasting My Time" (as Candy J)	1986	–	–	–
"Desire" (as Candy J)	1987	–	–	–
"Desirable Revenge" (as Candy J)	1988	–	–	–
"Somethings They Never Change" (as Candy J)	1988	–	–	–
"Hurt Me! Hurt Me!" (as Candy J)	1989	–	–	–
"Hateful Head Helen" (as Hateful Head Helen)	1989	–	–	–
"Let's Get Together" (as Candy J)	1991	–	–	–
"Shoulda Known Better" (as Candy J)	1993	–	–	–
"The Walk"	1993	–	–	–
"Pretender"	1993	–	–	–
"Everybody" (as Candy J)	1995	–	–	–
"Fee Fi Fo Fum"	1995	23	-	1
"Wham Bam"	1996	20	7	5
"Heads, Tits And Ass"	1997	–	–	–
"Bamboozled" (as Candy J)	1998	–	–	–
"—" denotes a single that did not chart or was not released in that territory.
