= Elroy Powell =

British singer-songwriter (born 1973)

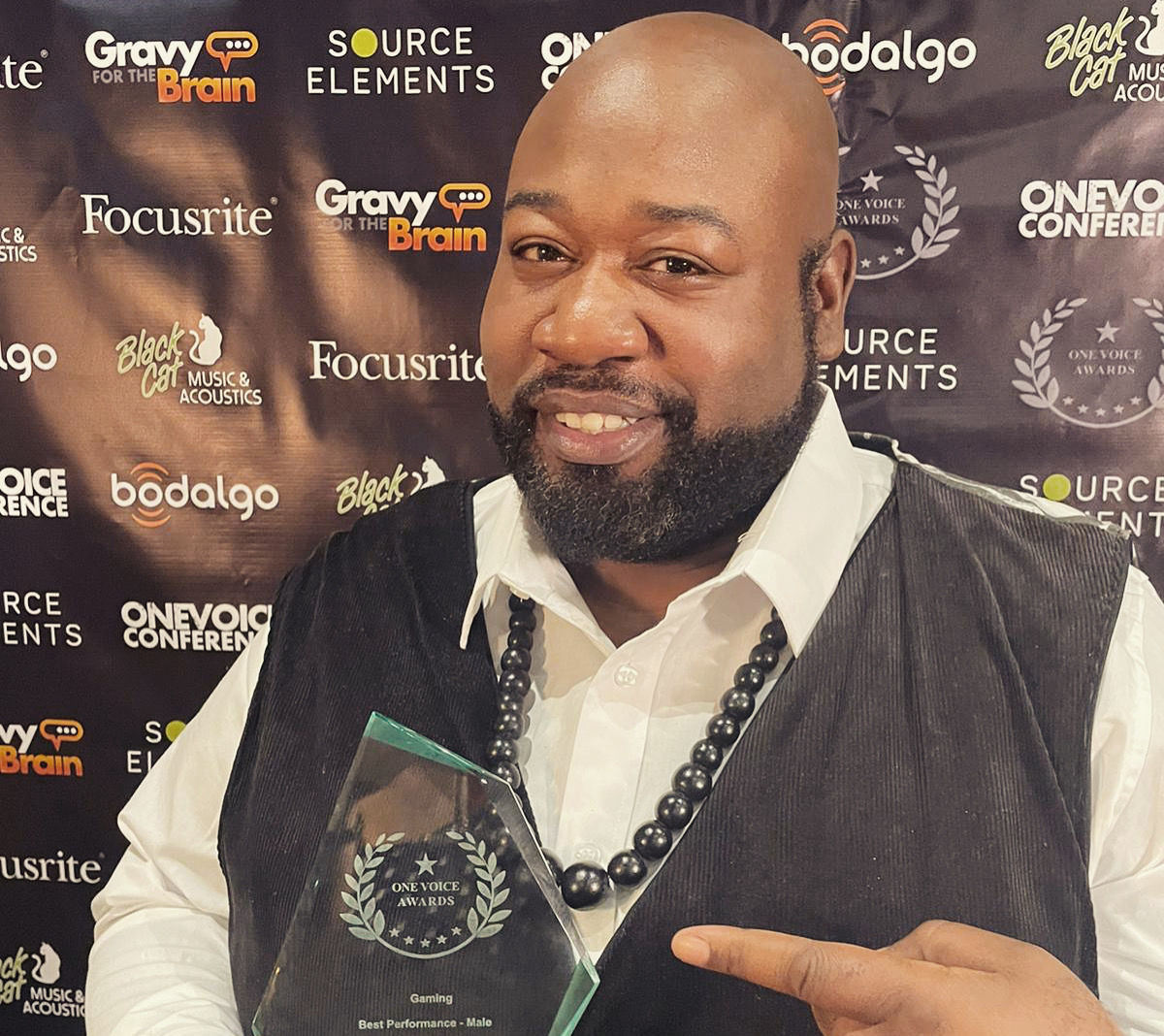
- Powell in 2022

Background information
- Born: August 28, 1973 (age 52)
- Occupation(s): singer, songwriter, producer

Elroy Powell, better known by his stage name Spoonface (born 28 August 1973), is a British singer, songwriter, producer and actor. He is known as a member of the music group Black Legend.

== Early life ==
Powell grew up in Tottenham, the son of immigrants from Jamaica.

== Career ==
Spoonface achieved international recording success with the Black Legend cover of Barry White's song, "You See the Trouble with Me". The single reached No. 1 in the UK Singles Chart. He has collaborated with a number of artists including Deekline, High Contrast, Omar Lye-Fook, Janet Kay, Kelis, Craig David, Daniel Merriweather and the Sugababes.

He has also made screen appearances as Biggy Spect in the BBC series Trexx and Flipside and as a presenter on Trouble TV’s interactive game show, Freakin Famous. Spoonface also appears on the BBC TV soap opera EastEnders and in Star Wars Episode VII as Rosser Weno. More recent appearances include the film Fighting with My Family, Pirates, Jingle Jangle and the Harry Enfield 100 years of BBC special.

Spoonface is also a video game voice actor. He has appeared in Dying Light 2 Stay Human for which he won the One Voice Conference award for Best Male Voice in Gaming. Spoonface has also appeared in Dota 2 voice the character Magnus, and as the character Knowledge in Minecraft Legends.
