= Southside Spinners =

Dutch musical partnership

Southside Spinners is a Dutch musical partnership between Marco Verkuylen (a.k.a. Marco V), Benjamin Kuyten (a.k.a. Benjamin Bates), and Jesse and Thomas Hagenbeek.

Their single "Luvstruck", released in 1998 in the Netherlands, initially reached number 81 on the UK Singles Chart in July 1999. It gained extra prominence a year later when used in the soundtrack of the film Kevin & Perry Go Large, and upon re-release in May 2000, it peaked at number 9 on the UK chart.
