= Elementfour =

UK music producing duo

- Also known as: Paul Oakenfold & Andy Gray; Element Four; Element 4
- Origin: United Kingdom
- Genre: Trance
- Years active: 2000
- Label: Channel 4 Music
- Past members: Paul Oakenfold; Andy Gray

Elementfour (variants Element Four and Element 4) was a music producing duo made up of DJ Paul Oakenfold and musician/composer Andy Gray. Sometime before July 2000, they collaborated in writing and producing the opening theme for the Channel 4 reality series Big Brother. The theme, which was later released as a single, continued to be used when Big Brother and Celebrity Big Brother moved to Channel 5 from 18 August 2011 until the show was axed and ended on 5 November 2018. A sample from the track was used again in 2022 to promote the upcoming 2023 series on ITV2.

== Discography ==
=== Singles ===
As Elementfour

- 2000: "Big Brother UK TV Theme"
- 2000: "Element Four" (Belgium) (reached No.13 in the Ultratop Dance charts)

As Paul Oakenfold and Andy Gray

- 2000: "Tast-E" (Australia, Greece) (did not chart)

Title	Year	Peak chart positions			Album
Title	Year	BEL	SCO	UK	Album
"Tast-E"	2000	—	—	—	Non-album singles
"Big Brother UK TV Theme"	2000	—	3	4	Non-album singles
"Element Four"	2000	13	—	—	Non-album singles
"—" denotes releases that did not chart or were not released.
