= Don't Wanna Let You Go =

2000 single by Five

Single by Five

from the album Invincible
- B-side: "Battlestar"
- Released: 14 February 2000
- Studio: Windmill Lane (Dublin, Ireland)
- Length: 3:24 (album version); 3:38 (radio edit)
- Label: RCA; BMG
- Songwriters: Richard Stannard; Julian Gallagher; Richard Breen; Jason "J" Brown; Sean Conlon
- Producers: Richard Stannard; Julian Gallagher

Five singles chronology
"Keep On Movin'" (1999)	"Don't Wanna Let You Go" (2000)	"We Will Rock You" (2000)

Music video
- "Don't Wanna Let You Go" on YouTube

"Don't Wanna Let You Go" is a song by British boy band Five. Written by producers Richard Stannard and Julian Gallagher with band members Abs Breen, and Jason "J" Brown, and Sean Conlon, the song was released on 14 February 2000 as the third single from Five's second studio album, Invincible (1999). Scott Robinson is the leading voice in the choruses. He and Ritchie Neville handle the lead vocal duties in the first and second verses, respectively, with some melodic rapping by Jason Brown during the pre-choruses.

== Chart performance ==
The song debuted at number nine on the UK Singles Chart on 18 March 2000. It also peaked at number five in New Zealand, number 11 in Ireland, number 17 in Australia and in the Netherlands, number 19 in Italy, number 22 in Sweden, number 26 in the Wallonia region of Belgium, and number 37 in the Flanders region of Belgium.

== Music video ==
Directed by Cameron Casey (who also directed the videos for "If Ya Gettin' Down" and "Keep On Movin'"), produced by Andy Leahy and Richard Fenton, and inspired by the 1999 movie The Matrix, the video begins with binary code on a computer screen. A computerised voice says "OK, I'm in. Five, you're mine." Three members of the band, Ritchie Neville, Sean Conlon and Abs Breen, sit in a room looking at a laptop when Scott Robinson comes in and says "Lads? The freak is officially...back.", and dumps a big pile of fanmail on the table. An obsessive female fan appears to have been constantly sending Five emails and letters, hoping to meet them, so they decide to go to the girl's address in their Range Rover. They pull up at a mansion (Luton Hoo) and they look round. Jason "J" Brown touches a large graphic and gets sucked into the girl's computer. While the girl is on the computer, she watches the faces of each member of the band. The sparks come through, and she gasps when she attempts escape. Several minutes later, she runs down the stairs, enters a different office and discovers Sean's head inside a refrigerator, subsequently screaming in terror. When Five dance in the hallway, she runs back into the same office and answers the telephone to a disturbing voice. The sparks and electricity crashes on the computer and she runs out while screaming. After Abs, Scott, Ritchie, and Sean regroup, Abs says, "So, lads, we've had enough. No more games." Ritchie concurs, "Let's get J back". The members turn invisible, and the fan closes her eyes and screams again. Following that, J reemerges and then goes on to rejoin the rest of the band. The members dance and the Five logo comes up. At the final scene, the lightning strikes the mansion and she runs away while screaming. As the video fades to black, the fan's intense scream can be heard at the end.

According to Brown, he got a severe mental breakdown during the production of the video after frequent insomnia.

== Track listings ==
UK and Australian CD1

1. "Don't Wanna Let You Go" (radio edit) – 3:38
2. "Don't Wanna Let You Go" (Biffco extended mix) – 4:41
3. "Interview Request Line"

UK and Australian CD2

1. "Don't Wanna Let You Go" (radio edit)
2. "Battlestar"
3. Enhanced CD

UK cassette single and European CD single

1. "Don't Wanna Let You Go" (radio edit)
2. "Battlestar"

== Credits and personnel ==
Credits are lifted from the UK CD1 liner notes and the Invincible album booklet.

Studio

- Recorded at Windmill Lane Studios (Dublin, Ireland)

Personnel

- Richard Stannard – writing, production
- Julian Gallagher – writing, production
- Abs Breen – writing (as Richard Breen)
- Jason "J" Brown – writing
- Sean Conlon – writing
- Mikkel Eriksen – all instruments
- Hallgeir Rustan – all instruments
- Tor Erik Hermansen – all instruments
- Adrian Bushby – recording, mixing
- Alvin Sweeney – recording assistant
- Jake Davies – Pro Tools
- StarGate – remix and additional production

== Charts ==
=== Weekly charts ===
Chart (2000)	Peak position
Australia (ARIA)	17
Belgium (Ultratop 50 Flanders)	37
Belgium (Ultratop 50 Wallonia)	26
Estonia (Eesti Top 20)	2
Europe (Eurochart Hot 100)	28
Europe (European Hit Radio)	36
Finland (Suomen virallinen lista)	20
Germany (GfK)	81
Guatemala (El Siglo de Torreón)	8
Iceland (Íslenski Listinn Topp 40)	6
Ireland (IRMA)	11
Italy (FIMI)	19
Italy (Musica e dischi)	20
Netherlands (Dutch Top 40)	13
Netherlands (Single Top 100)	17
Netherlands Airplay (Music & Media)	22
New Zealand (Recorded Music NZ)	5
Scottish Singles Sales (Official Charts)	8
Sweden (Sverigetopplistan)	22
Switzerland (Schweizer Hitparade)	69
UK Singles (Official Charts)	9
UK Airplay (Music Week)	19

=== Year-end chart ===
Chart (2000)	Position
Australia (ARIA)	98
Iceland (Íslenski Listinn Topp 40)	77
UK Singles (OCC)	128

== Release history ==
Region	Date	Format(s)	Label(s)	Ref.
Sweden	14 February 2000	CD	RCA; BMG	
United Kingdom	6 March 2000	CD; cassette	RCA; BMG	
