= Bullet in the Gun =

Single by Planet Perfecto
- Released: 1999; 2000 (Re-issue)
- Recorded: 1999
- Genre: Trance
- Length: 3:15 (Radio Mix); 3:13 (2000 Radio Mix)
- Label: Perfecto
- Songwriter: Jake Williams
- Producers: Paul Oakenfold, Ian Masterson, Jake Williams

Planet Perfecto singles chronology
"Not Over Yet feat. Grace" (1999)	"Bullet in the Gun" (1999)	"Bites Da Dust" (2001)

"Bullet in the Gun" is a trance music single by the British producers Paul Oakenfold, Ian Masterson, and Jake William and released under the moniker Planet Perfecto. It was originally released in 1999 on Perfecto Records and gained recognition for its energetic rhythm and atmospheric synth melodies, typical of late 1990s trance music.

The single was re-released in 2000 featuring new remixes by Rob Searle, Rabbit in the Moon, and Solarstone, expanding its reach and appeal within the electronic dance music scene.

== Background and composition ==
"Bullet in the Gun" emerged during the height of the trance music era and became representative of Planet Perfecto's distinctive sound and the broader global dance music culture of the late 1990s. The initial 1999 release included remixes from artists such as Trouser Enthusiasts, appealing to underground dance music fans. The 2000 re-issue aimed for broader appeal with a fresh set of remixes.

The song's composition is built around a combination of driving percussion, layered synthesizers, and minimal vocal samples, making it a popular choice for DJs internationally.

== Release history ==
Released initially in 1999, "Bullet in the Gun" coincided with the increasing popularity of trance music in nightclubs and on radio stations across Europe. Its success led to a re-issue in 2000 with additional remixes which helped the song achieve chart positions in several countries. In the United Kingdom, the original release of "Bullet in the Gun" reached number 15 on the UK Singles Chart and also performed strongly on both dance and independent charts.

One notable aspect of the single's release history is the variety of versions and remixes produced. Among these is a longer instrumental version that omits the vocal elements entirely.

=== Rare instrumental edit ===
A full-length instrumental version of "Bullet in the Gun," without any vocals, is believed to have been exclusively released on the Paul van Dyk mix album Muzik Magazine Presents Paul Van Dyk – 60 Minute Mix in May 1999.

This instrumental edit, lacking vocals, has become a sought-after item among collectors. It has not been confirmed to appear on any other single or compilation, contributing to discussions among trance enthusiasts and collectors interested in rare and alternative versions from the late 1990s dance scene.

New diversified release 2025

Rare version with differently sung female vocals, released in 2025 by the Greek DJ and Music / Radio producer Alfa Key (Apostolos Kolovos) available in the most known music platforms.

== Impact and legacy ==
"Bullet in the Gun" is considered an iconic track of the late 1990s trance movement. Its various forms, from radio edits to extended mixes, illustrate the diverse remixing approaches common at the time and highlight Planet Perfecto's influence in shaping the sound of electronic dance music. The instrumental edit, in particular, emphasizes the era's trend of creating exclusive mixes for DJs and dedicated fans, solidifying the track's place in trance music history.

== Chart performance ==
Chart performance for "Bullet in the Gun" (1999)
Chart	Peak position
Australia (ARIA)	99
Ireland	25
Netherlands	62
Scotland	27
UK	15
UK Dance	10
UK Indie	7

Chart performance for "Bullet in the Gun 2000" (2000)
Chart	Peak position
Scotland	52
UK	7
UK Dance	2
UK Indie	1
