= Nu Generation =

British pop group

Nu Generation is a British pop group, best known for their hit single "In Your Arms (Rescue Me)", heavily sampling the Fontella Bass song. The song entered the UK Singles Chart on 22 January 2000 at No. 8, its highest placement on the chart. The song also charted in Ireland (#29). Later that same year, it appeared in the top 100 of the singles charts in Belgium, France, Germany, and the Netherlands.
