= Big Brother UK TV Theme =

Opening theme song for the British reality TV series

Single by Elementfour
- Released: 28 August 2000
- Recorded: 2000
- Genre: Techno
- Length: 3:20
- Label: Channel 4 Music
- Songwriters: Paul Oakenfold; Andy Gray
- Producers: Paul Oakenfold; Andy Gray

The Big Brother UK TV Theme, also known as "Element Four" in Belgium or as "Tast-E" in Australia and Greece, is the opening theme for the British reality TV series Big Brother, written and produced by music duo Elementfour in 2000.

Following the success of the first British series that year, the theme was released as a single. It became a hit in September 2000 when it reached number 4, selling 47,186 copies in its first week. Overall the single spent 10 weeks on the UK Singles Chart and achieved more than 160,000 sales in total. It also reached number 3 on the Scottish Singles Chart where it spent nine weeks in the top 100.

The original theme was used through the first four series of Big Brother, and was later replaced by a revamped version from the fifth series onwards with an enhanced bassline. Versions of the theme continued to be used throughout Channel 4's run of Big Brother and Celebrity Big Brother and was retained when both shows moved to Channel 5 in 2011. A sample from the 12-inch remixed version of the track was used in August 2022 to promote the revived 2023 series on ITV2.

In July 2016, it was revealed that the track was the 14th highest-charting TV theme of all time in the UK. In June 2020 it was announced the song had sold 164,000 CD singles in the twenty years since its release, with no additional downloads or streaming sales due to it not being available digitally. In October 2023, the revived series began and a remixed new version of the original theme was digitally released by Oakenfold under the name Perfecto Allstarz.

== Background and release ==
The original name for the track, as evidenced by promotional copies, was "Tast-E", and this was before the duo had settled on a collective name for themselves either. "Tast-E" was released in Australia on CD (WEA), Belgium as "Element Four" (12", Xtra Nova) and Greece (CD, Planetworks).

The theme was also featured on the soundtrack for the first series, which was released that same year.

== Composition ==
In September 2010, Gray said to Leo Hickman of The Guardian "I came up with the basic melody while babysitting my five-week-old daughter,". "I was rocking her with my toe under my keyboard as I was playing around with chord structures. I suppose it took three days to write.", with Oakenfold adding that he is proud of their "iconic piece of music". The single version sold nearly 300,000 copies and reached number 4 in the charts in September 2000, Oakenfold stresses, "without it even being play-listed by Radio 1". "Channel 4 took a leap of faith to use it. It's not a limp piano line; it's really quite heavy and electronic. I would say the programme and its music have changed culture, not just television."

In August 2011 Oakenfold, asked if he was happy that the theme had been retained by Channel 5, told Digital Spy "Of course I was. I'm very proud of my track and it's become quite an iconic piece of music." Questioned on whether he received royalty cheques every series, Oakenfold laughed "Everyone does - of course. That's the way it works if you write music."

== Track listing ==
All music is composed by Paul Oakenfold and Andy Gray (as Elementfour).

Track listing
No.	Title	Producer(s)	Length
1.	"Big Brother (Vocal Mix - Radio Edit)"	Paul Oakenfold; Andy Gray	3:20
2.	"Big Brother (Grayed Out Deep House Mix)"	Paul Oakenfold; Andy Gray	6:28
3.	"Big Brother (12" Mix)"	Paul Oakenfold; Andy Gray	10:02
Total length:			19:52

== Charts ==
=== Weekly charts ===
Chart (2000)	Peak position
Belgium Dance (Ultratop)	13
Europe (Eurochart Hot 100)	21
Scottish Singles Sales (Official Charts)	3
UK Singles (Official Charts)	4

=== Year-end charts ===
Chart (2000)	Position
Ireland (IRMA)	79
UK Singles (OCC)	99

== Release history ==
Region	Date	Format(s)	Label(s)	Ref.
United Kingdom	28 August 2000	CD single; cassette single; 12-inch vinyl	Channel 4 Music	
Australia	2000	CD single; maxi single	Warner Music Australia	
Belgium	20 November 2000	12-inch vinyl	Xtra Nova	
Greece	2000	CD single; maxi single	Planetworks	

== Big Brother - The Original Soundtrack ==
Big Brother - The Original Soundtrack

Soundtrack album by Various artists
- Released: 14 August 2000
- Genre: Soundtrack
- Length: 2:34:22
- Labels: 4 Music; Bazal Productions
- Producers: Paul Oakenfold; Andy Gray
- Compiler: Tim Binns

The soundtrack is a compilation of contemporary and classic dance tracks featured in the first series.

=== Track listings ===
Disc 1

1. "Big Brother Theme" – Elementfour
2. "Phat Planet"– Leftfield
3. "Breathe" – The Prodigy
4. "Going Out of My Head" – Fatboy Slim
5. "Push Upstairs" – Underworld
6. "Tell Me Why (The Riddle)" – Paul van Dyk
7. "Dooms Night" (Timo Maas remix edit) – Azzido Da Bass
8. "Reach Out" – Midfield General
9. "Freeze" (original mix) – Cut La Roc
10. "Der Schriber" – Timo Maas
11. "Be U 4T" – Peace Division
12. "Heaven Scent" – Bedrock
13. "Belfast (Sasha)" – Orbital

Disc 2

1. "Porcelain" (single version) – Moby
2. "Finished Symphony" (Hybrid's extended edit) – Hybrid
3. "The Man with the Red Face" (Svek remix) – Laurent Garnier
4. "Brown Paper Bag" – Roni Size
5. "The Future of the Future (Stay Gold)" – Everything but the Girl
6. "King of My Castle" (original album mix) – Wamdue Project
7. "I See You Baby" – Groove Armada
8. "D*Votion 2000" – D*Note
9. "Clubbed to Death" (Peshay mix) – Rob D
10. "Les Nuits" – Nightmares on Wax
11. "Swimming Pool" – Rae & Christian
12. "Slip Into Something More Comfortable" – Kinobe
13. "Big Brother Theme" (Grayed Out Deep House Mix) – Elementfour
