= Des Mitchell =

British DJ radio presenter and music producer

Des Mitchell is a music producer best known for his hit single "(Welcome) To the Dance", which peaked at number 5 on the UK Singles Chart in January 2000.
