= Hi-Gate =

UK musical group

Hi-Gate is the dance music pairing of BBC Radio 1 DJ Judge Jules, and Paul Masterson.

== History ==
In 1998, Masterson sent Jules a copy of a track he had just finished, which would later become known as 'Yomanda – "Synth and Strings"'. Jules noted that the phone number on the track had the same area code on it as that of Jules, the Highgate area of London. Jules suggested removing the vocals on the track, and with the assistance of him playing the track on his BBC Radio 1 show, "Pitchin' (In Every Direction)" was elevated to the top 10 of the UK Singles Chart.

Following this, they co-produced "I Can Hear Voices" / "Caned and Unable" (2000). The songs saw them appearing on Top of the Pops. "I Can Hear Voices" included the vocals of Jina. In 2001, "Gonna Work It Out" became their third top 40 UK hit single.

Future work saw them collaborating with Boy George on the tracks "Out of Fashion" and "Poverty", which appeared on their album, Split Personality (2003).
