= Richard Marshall (DJ) =

Scanty Sandwich
- Origin: London, United Kingdom
- Labels: Southern Fried

Richard Marshall, also known by his stage name Scanty Sandwich, is a British DJ and producer who has created and produced many club records under various guises. His best known song is "Because of You". The single spent ten weeks and peaked at number 3 on the UK Singles Chart in January 2000. In 1999, he signed to Southern Fried Records, a label by Grammy award-winning British DJ Norman Cook who is best known as Fatboy Slim.
