= You See the Trouble with Me =

1976 single by Barry White

Single by Barry White

from the album Let the Music Play
- B-side: "I'm So Blue and You Are Too"
- Released: February 27, 1976
- Genre: Soul
- Length: 3:18
- Label: 20th Century
- Songwriters: Barry White, Ray Parker Jr.
- Producer: Barry White

Barry White singles chronology
"Let the Music Play" (1975)	"You See the Trouble with Me" (1976)	"Baby, We Better Try to Get It Together" (1976)

"You See the Trouble with Me" is a song recorded by American soul artist Barry White, written by White and Ray Parker Jr. It was released in February 1976 as the second single from White's album Let the Music Play. In its initial release, the track reached number 14 on Billboard's Black Singles chart, and number two in the United Kingdom. It was certified silver for 250,000 copies shipped in United Kingdom in 1976.

== Track listing ==
European 7-inch single (1976)

1. "You See the Trouble with Me" - 3:18
2. "I'm So Blue and You Are Too" - 4:21

== Charts ==
Chart (1976)	Peak position
Germany (Media Control AG)	14
Ireland (IRMA)	15
Netherlands (Dutch Top 40)	19
United Kingdom (OCC)	2
US Billboard Hot Soul Singles	14
US Billboard National Disco Action Top 30	15

== Certifications ==
Region	Certification	Certified units/sales
United Kingdom (BPI)	Silver	250,000^{^}
^{^} Shipments figures based on certification alone.

== Black Legend version ==
"You See the Trouble with Me"

Single by Black Legend
- B-side: "Across the Ocean"
- Released: April 10, 2000 (Spain)
- Length: 3:46
- Label: Rise
- Songwriters: Barry White; Ray Parker Jr.
- Producers: J-Reverse; Enrico "BSJ" Ferrari

Black Legend singles chronology
"You See the Trouble with Me" (2000)	"Light My Fire" (2000)

A cover version in 2000, credited to Italian musical group Black Legend, originally sampled Barry White; however, White had not given permission for this, so the vocals were re-recorded by Black Legend member Elroy "Spoonface" Powell. In an interview with NME, White explained why he refused permission: "When I heard the Black Legend song, I thought it was going nowhere. It was cheap and had no soul".

This 2000 version was a hit across Europe, reaching number one in the UK in June of that year. The song was the 40th-best-selling single of 2000 in the UK.

=== Track listing ===
1. "You See the Trouble with Me" (We'll Be in Trouble radio edit) – 3:16
2. "You See the Trouble with Me" (Sharam Jey Remix) – 6:25
3. "You See the Trouble with Me" (We'll Be in Trouble original radio edit) – 4:58
4. "Across the Ocean" (album version) – 5:44

=== Charts ===
==== Weekly charts ====
Chart (2000)	Peak position
Australia (ARIA)	26
Belgium (Ultratop 50 Flanders)	42
Belgium (Ultratop 50 Wallonia)	5
Canada (Nielsen SoundScan); Import	7
Canada Dance/Urban (RPM)	1
Europe (Eurochart Hot 100)	6
France (SNEP)	21
Germany (GfK)	39
Greece (IFPI)	10
Ireland (IRMA)	6
Ireland Dance (IRMA)	1
Italy (FIMI)	24
Netherlands (Dutch Top 40)	18
Netherlands (Single Top 100)	16
Norway (VG-lista)	20
Scottish Singles Sales (Official Charts)	1
Spain (Promusicae)	13
Switzerland (Schweizer Hitparade)	22
UK Singles (Official Charts)	1
UK Dance (Official Charts)	5
UK Indie (Official Charts)	4
US Dance Club Play (Billboard)	7
US Maxi-Singles Sales (Billboard)	49

==== Year-end charts ====
Chart (2000)	Position
Belgium (Ultratop 50 Wallonia)	20
Europe (Eurochart Hot 100)	63
France (SNEP)	72
Ireland (IRMA)	49
UK Singles (OCC)	40

=== Certifications ===
Region	Certification	Certified units/sales
Belgium (BRMA)	Gold	25,000^{*}
United Kingdom (BPI) Sales since 2005	Gold	400,000^{‡}
^{*} Sales figures based on certification alone.^{‡} Sales+streaming figures based on certification alone.

=== Release history ===
Region	Date	Format(s)	Label(s)	Ref.
Italy	2000	12-inch vinyl; CD	Rise	
Spain	April 10, 2000	12-inch vinyl	Vendetta	
United Kingdom	June 12, 2000	12-inch vinyl; CD; cassette	Eternal	
