= Planet Perfecto =

UK dance group

- Origin: United Kingdom
- Genres: Dance music, trance music
- Years active: 1997–2001
- Label: Perfecto Records

Planet Perfecto was a artist moniker used by Perfecto Records related released by various producers. Of the name Planet Perfecto, Oakenfold stated "We were looking at building another brand. Planet Perfecto is a brand in its own right. It’s a radio show, it’s released music under the name and we wanted to release more music under Planet Perfecto.... If you’re an artist and you wanna do a commercial record on our label, you could put it out… you could release it under our brand."

== Musical career ==
The first release credited to Planet Perfecto was "Georgie Girl" on 12" vinyl in 1997 for a track produced by D.A.R.C. an alias of Dallas Austin; the single did not make it into the UK Singles Chart.

In 1998, producers Paul Oakenfold, Jake Williams and Ian Masterson came together to create Bullet In The Gun which would be issued to clubs as a white label and credited to Planet Perfecto. Before forming, all three producers had made their names in the dance music scene under different guises. Most notably Jake Williams as JX and Masterson with Flexifinger.

In 1999, the moniker was used for a re-release of Not Over Yet by Grace (group) which was being re-issued by EastWest's dance label Code Blue. This track entered the UK chart at #16 in August 1999. The release contained remixes by Matt Darey, Breeder and Da Sickboys though the lead radio edit was an edited version of the 1995 radio edit. In September 1999, Bullet In The Gun was released by Perfecto through their new distribution partner Mushroom Records and reached number 15. The track would be re-released in 2000 and peak at number 7.

In 2001 producer James Holden released a track under the Planet Perfecto moniker entitled Bites Da Dust. The release would contain an additional track by Oakenfold called Costas Groove.

== Discography ==
=== Singles ===
Year	Title	Peak chart positions							
Year	Title	UK	UK Dance	UK Indie	AUS	EUR	IRE	NED	SCO
1999	"Not Over Yet 99" (featuring Grace)	16	2	—	90	56	—	—	14
1999	"Bullet in the Gun"	15	10	7	99	53	25	62	27
2000	"Bullet in the Gun 2000"	7	2	1	—	33	32	—	5
2001	"Bites da Dust"	52	33	4	—	43	—	—	52
"—" denotes items that did not chart or were not released in that territory.
