= Black Legend (music group) =

Italian musical group

- Origin: Italy
- Genres: House
- Years active: 1999–2002
- Past members: Enrico Ferrari; Ciro Sasso; Elroy "Spoonface" Powell

Black Legend was a collaboration between Italian DJs and producers Enrico Ferrari and Ciro Sasso; plus British vocalist Elroy "Spoonface" Powell.

Black Legend's "You See the Trouble with Me" reached number one on the UK Singles Chart in June 2000. The chart-topping version featured a karaoke re-recording of the original Barry White vocal by Powell. A follow-up single titled "Somebody", billed as Shortie vs. Black Legend, failed to achieve chart success.

== Discography ==
=== Singles ===
Year	Title	Peak chart positions										Certifications (sales thresholds)	Album
Year	Title	AUS	FRA	GER	IRE	ITA	NLD	NOR	SWI	UK	US Dance	Certifications (sales thresholds)	Album
2000	"You See the Trouble with Me"	26	21	39	6	17	16	20	22	1	7	BPI: Gold	Singles only
2000	"Light My Fire"	—	—	—	—	—	—	—	—	—	—		Singles only
2001	"Somebody" (vs. Shortie)	—	—	—	—	—	—	—	75	37	—		Singles only
"—" denotes releases that did not chart
