= List of UK singles chart number ones of the 2000s =

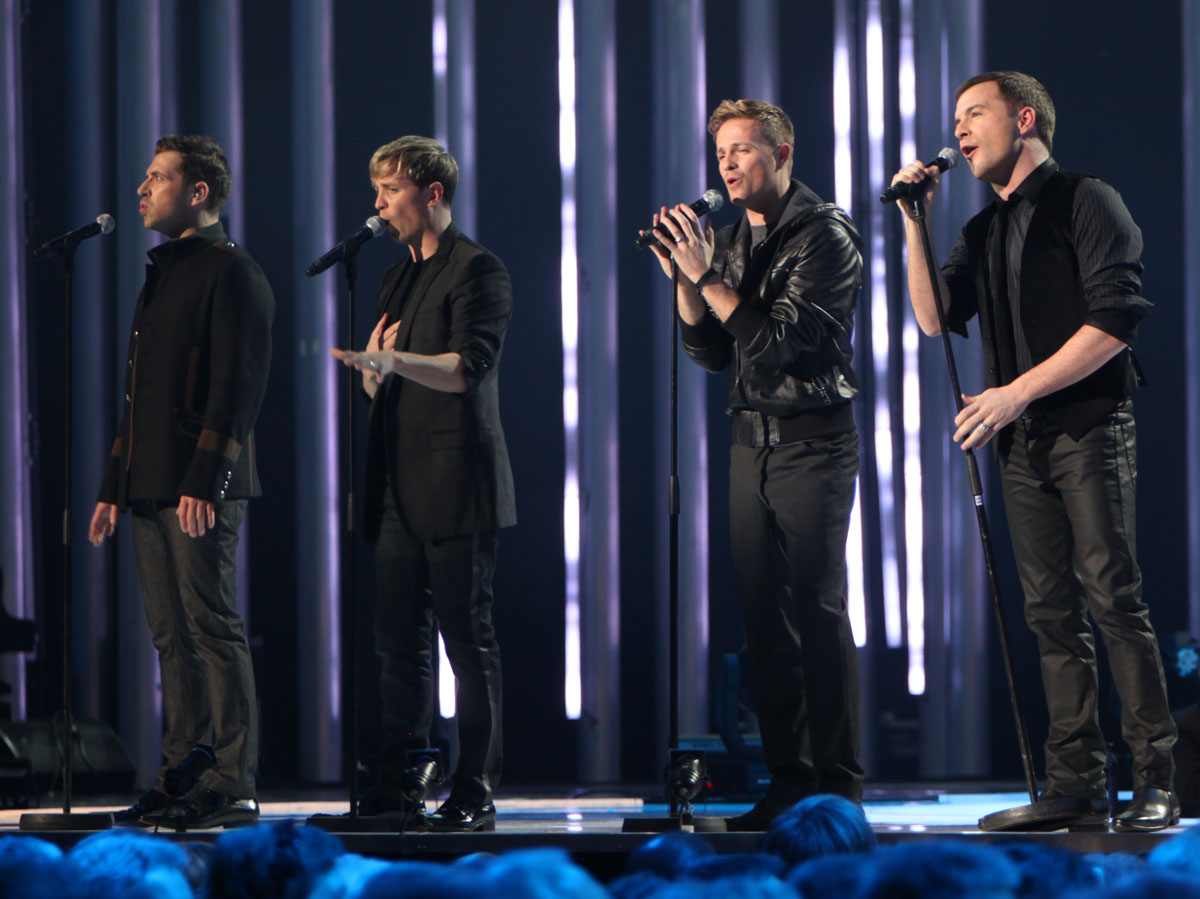
Westlife had 11 No. 1 singles between 2000 and 2009, including a cover of Phil Collins' "Against All Odds", which they released as a duet with Mariah Carey in 2000

The UK singles chart is compiled by the Official Charts Company (OCC) on behalf of the British record industry. In the 2000s, the chart week ran from Sunday to Saturday, and the top 40 singles were revealed each Sunday on BBC Radio 1. At the start of the decade, before the advent of legal music downloads, it was based entirely on sales of physical singles from retail outlets, but in 2005 permanent downloads began to be included in the chart compilation.

During the 2000s, 274 singles reached the No. 1 position on the chart, the most of any decade so far. Over this period, Westlife were the most successful group and music act at reaching the top spot, with 11 No. 1 singles. Rihanna and Jay-Z's song "Umbrella" spent 10 weeks at No. 1 in 2007, the longest spell at the top of the charts since Wet Wet Wet's 1994 hit "Love Is All Around", which topped the charts for 15 weeks. The Internet allowed music to be heard by vast numbers of people on social networking sites such as YouTube and Myspace; it also increased piracy. This and the introduction of the UK Singles Downloads Chart in 2004 led to a decrease in record sales and a reduction in the number of copies sold of a No. 1 record on the singles chart. Gnarls Barkley's "Crazy" became the first song to reach the top of the charts based on downloads alone in 2006, remaining at No. 1 for nine consecutive weeks.

Physical single sales had been falling for more than a decade but digital single sales finally turned the trend around in 2008 with combined physical and digital single sales growing 33% over the previous year. Lily Allen made herself known on the Internet through her Myspace page, and following this exposure, her debut single "Smile" peaked at No. 1. Three years later, her single "The Fear" topped the chart for four consecutive weeks, being the longest running No. 1 single of 2009.

Reality television shows played an important and influential role on the charts during the decade. Hear'Say won the original series of Popstars in 2000 and topped the charts with their debut single "Pure and Simple". A trend developed as this feat was replicated by Pop Idol winners Will Young (2002) and Michelle McManus (2003), and runners-up Gareth Gates and Sam & Mark; 2002 Fame Academy winner David Sneddon, and the winner of the first series of The X Factor, Steve Brookstein, in 2005. Reality television winners did especially well during the Christmas season; every Christmas No. 1 from 2005 to 2008 came from an X Factor winner. Shayne Ward reached No. 1 in 2005 with "That's My Goal", and he was followed by Leona Lewis, Leon Jackson and Alexandra Burke. Girls Aloud, the Popstars: The Rivals winners, also had the Christmas No. 1 in 2002 with "Sound of the Underground." Kelly Clarkson, the winner of the first series of American Idol achieved her first UK No. 1 single, "My Life Would Suck Without You", in 2009.

The first No.1 of the decade was “The Masses Against the Classes” by Manic Street Preachers (not counting the double-A side "I Have a Dream" / "Seasons in the Sun" by Westlife, which was a holdover from the end of 1999). "Killing in the Name" by Rage Against the Machine was the final No. 1 of the decade. In January 2001, "Touch Me" by Rui da Silva featuring Cassandra became the first new No.1 of the 21st century and third millennium of the common era. In January 2005, a landmark was reached as the re-release of Elvis Presley's "One Night" became the 1,000th single to reach No. 1 in the singles chart.

== Chart history ==
In 2000, 42 songs (not including Westlife's "I Have a Dream" / "Seasons in the Sun", which first reached number one at the end of 1999) hit the top spot, a UK charts record for most number ones in a calendar year. The year 2000 also holds the record for most consecutive weeks with a new number one, with a different single hitting the number-one spot every week from 24 June to 16 September.

Six songs returned to the top of the charts for two separate spells: "Don't Stop Movin'" by S Club 7 (2001), "Gotta Get Thru This" by Daniel Bedingfield (2001–2002), "Call on Me" by Eric Prydz (2004), "Hips Don't Lie" by Shakira featuring Wyclef Jean (2006), and "Boom Boom Pow" (2009) and "I Gotta Feeling" (2009) by the Black Eyed Peas. In addition, Lady Gaga's "Bad Romance" was number one in December 2009 and climbed back to the top in January 2010.

== Number-one singles ==
Key
No.	nth single to top the UK singles chart
re	Return of a single to number one
Silver	Silver certification (200,000 units)
Gold	Gold certification (400,000 units)
Platinum	Platinum certification (600,000 units)
†	Best-selling single of the year
‡	Best-selling single of the decade

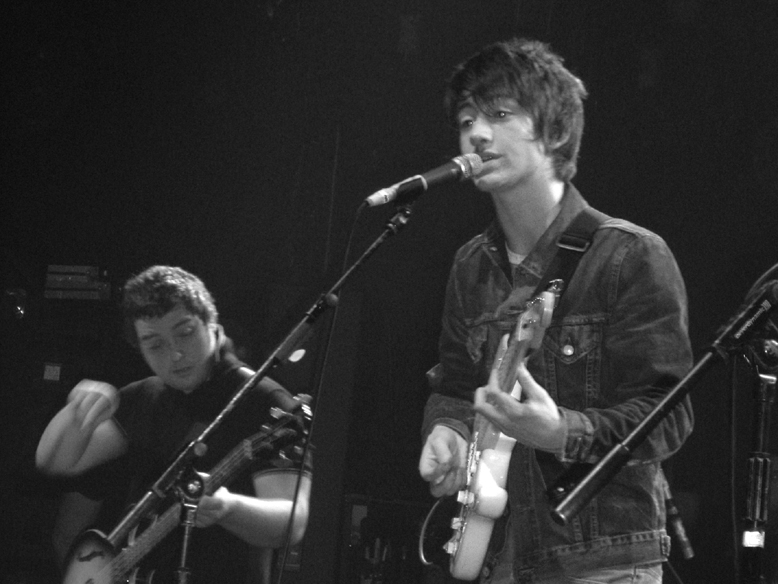
Arctic Monkeys scored two number-ones this decade with their debut single, "I Bet You Look Good on the Dancefloor" and "When the Sun Goes Down", and are one of the first acts to come to the public attention via the Internet.

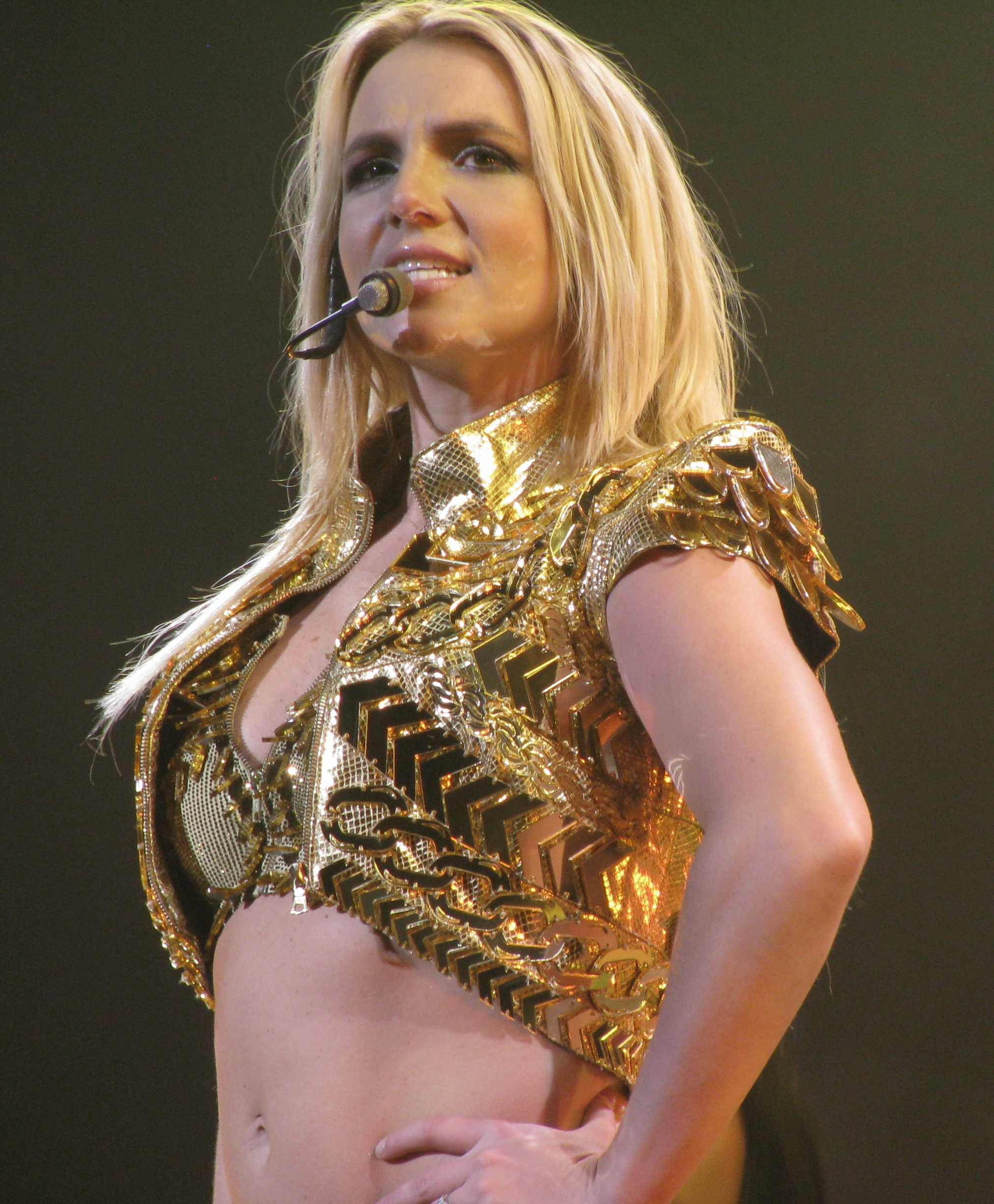
Britney Spears hit the top spot with "Oops!... I Did It Again" and "Born to Make You Happy" in 2000, and with "Toxic" and "Everytime" in 2004.

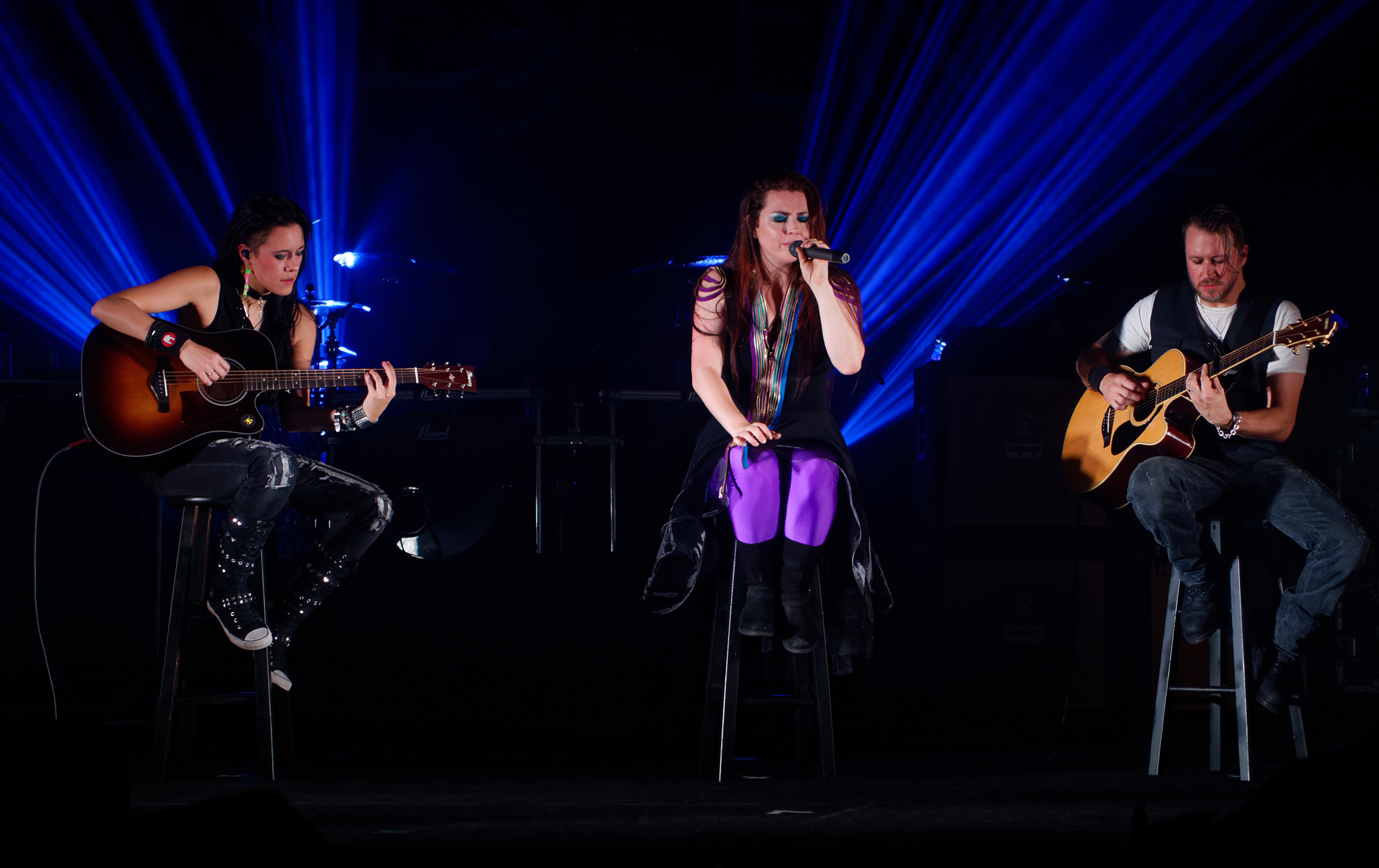
American rock band Evanescence debuted at number one with their single "Bring Me To Life" and their album "Fallen" in 2003 and started their massive international success.

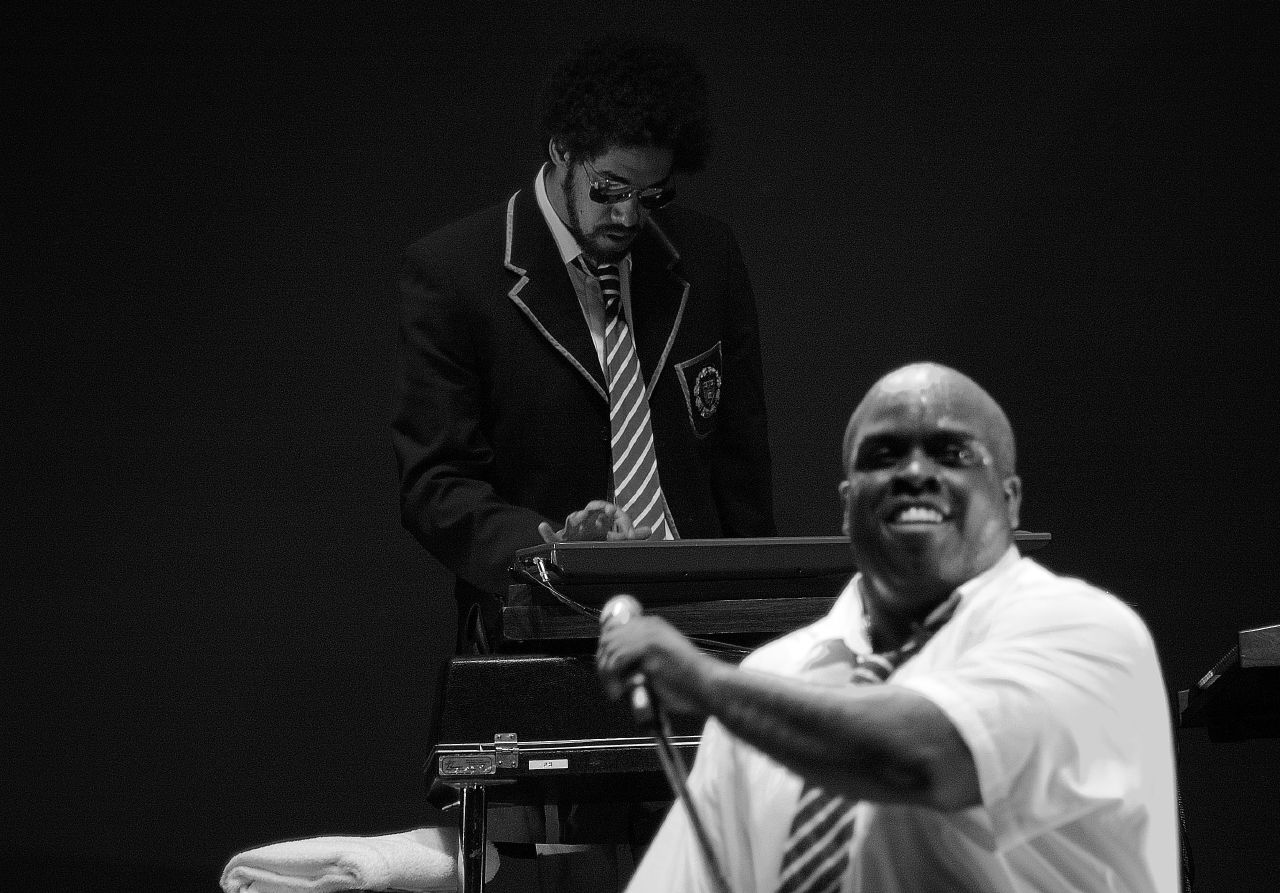
Gnarls Barkley's "Crazy" became the first song to reach number one on downloads alone in 2006 and the first song since 1994 to spend longer than two months at number one.

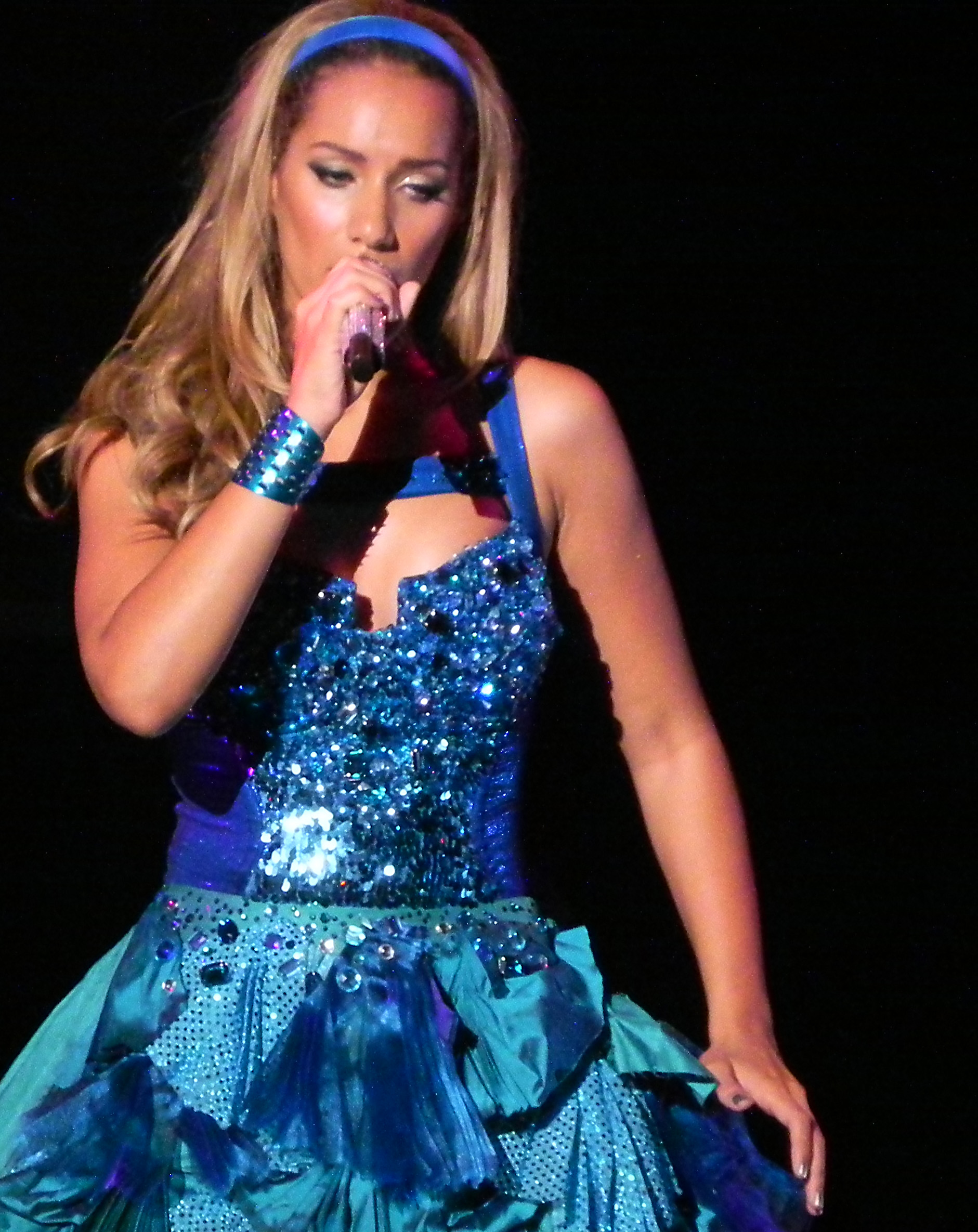
Leona Lewis saw her debut single, "A Moment Like This", reach number one in 2006. Two more chart-toppers followed, including "Bleeding Love" which had a 7-week reign at number one in 2007 and "Run" in 2008.

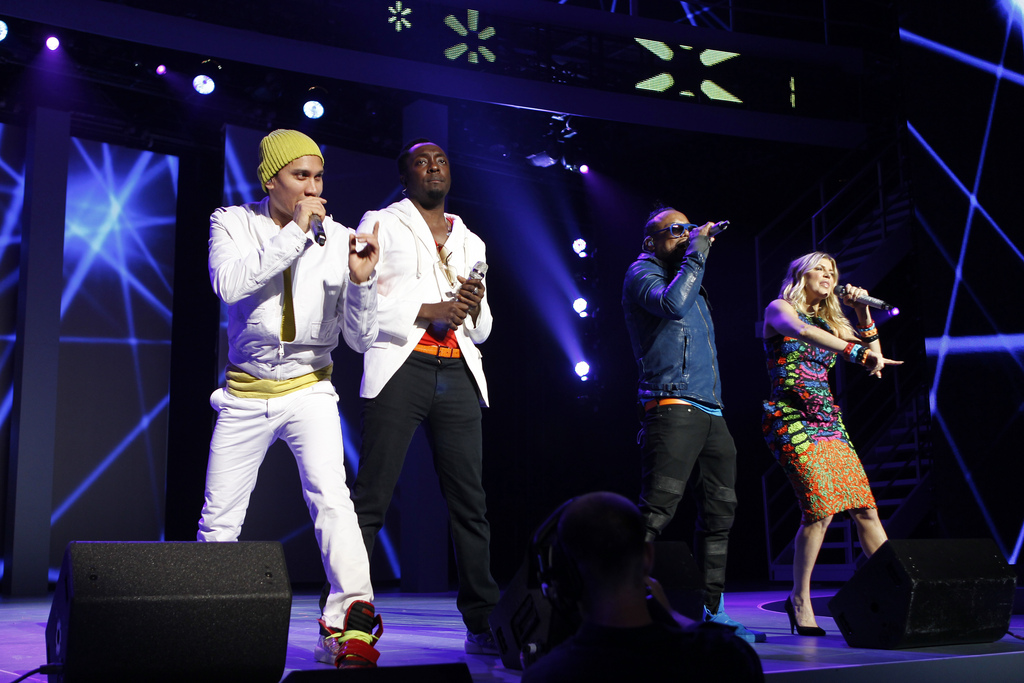
American group The Black Eyed Peas spent six weeks at number one with "Where Is the Love?" in 2003. In 2009, "Boom Boom Pow", "I Gotta Feeling" and "Meet Me Halfway" also reached the number-one spot.

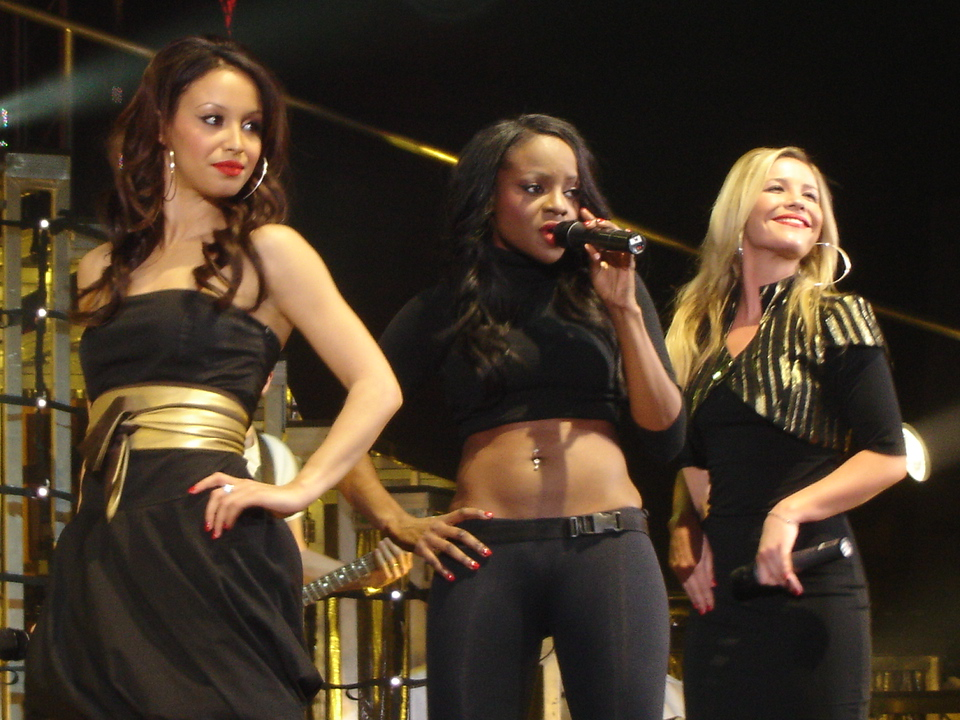
Sugababes had more number-one singles than any other female act in the 2000s, with six. Their first number-one was "Freak like Me" in 2002.

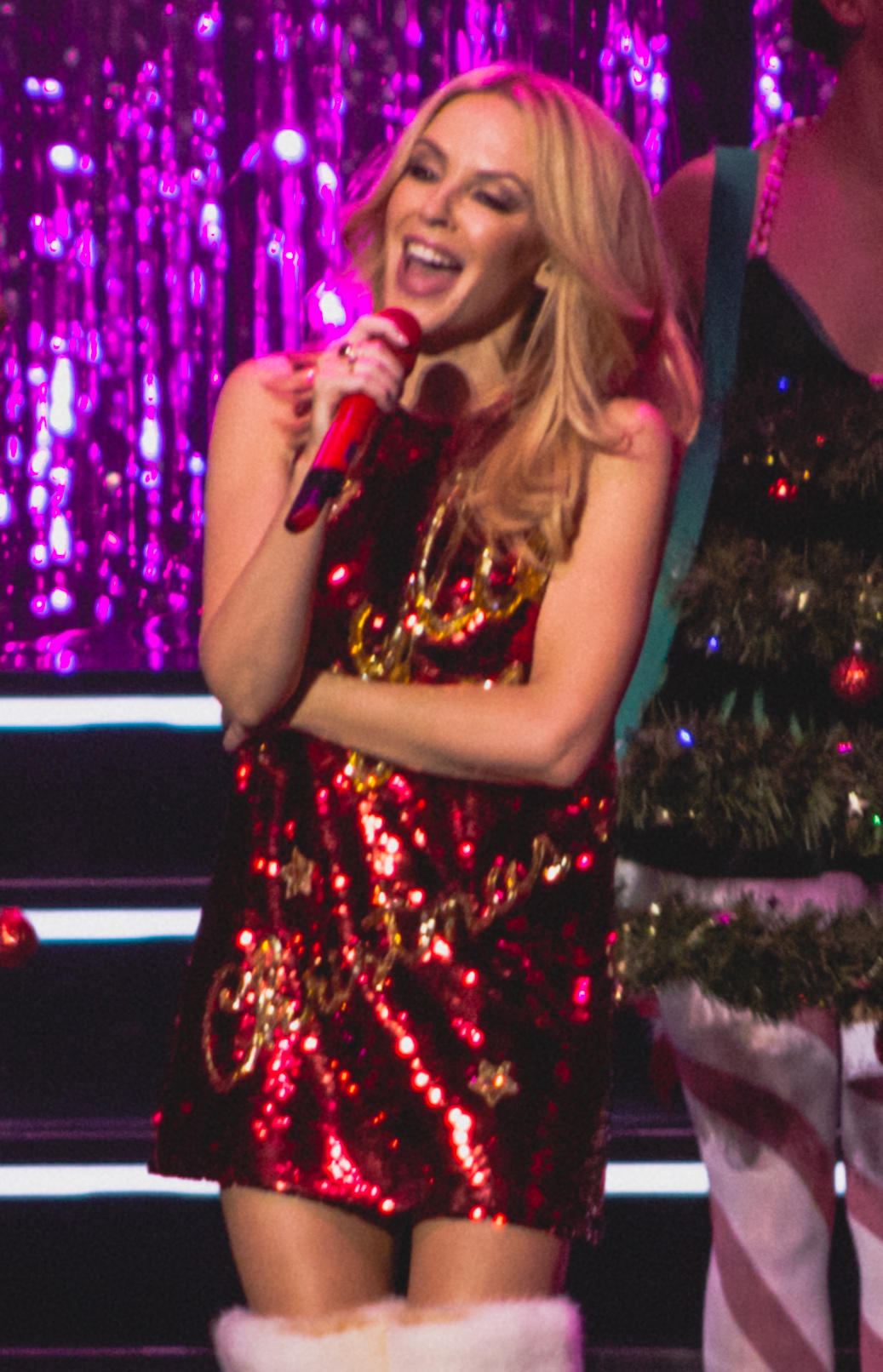
Kylie Minogue scored her second number one of the decade with "Can't Get You Out of My Head" in 2001, selling more than 1.1 million copies. It was the biggest-selling single by a female of the 21st century until 2011, when it was surpassed by Adele's "Someone like You".

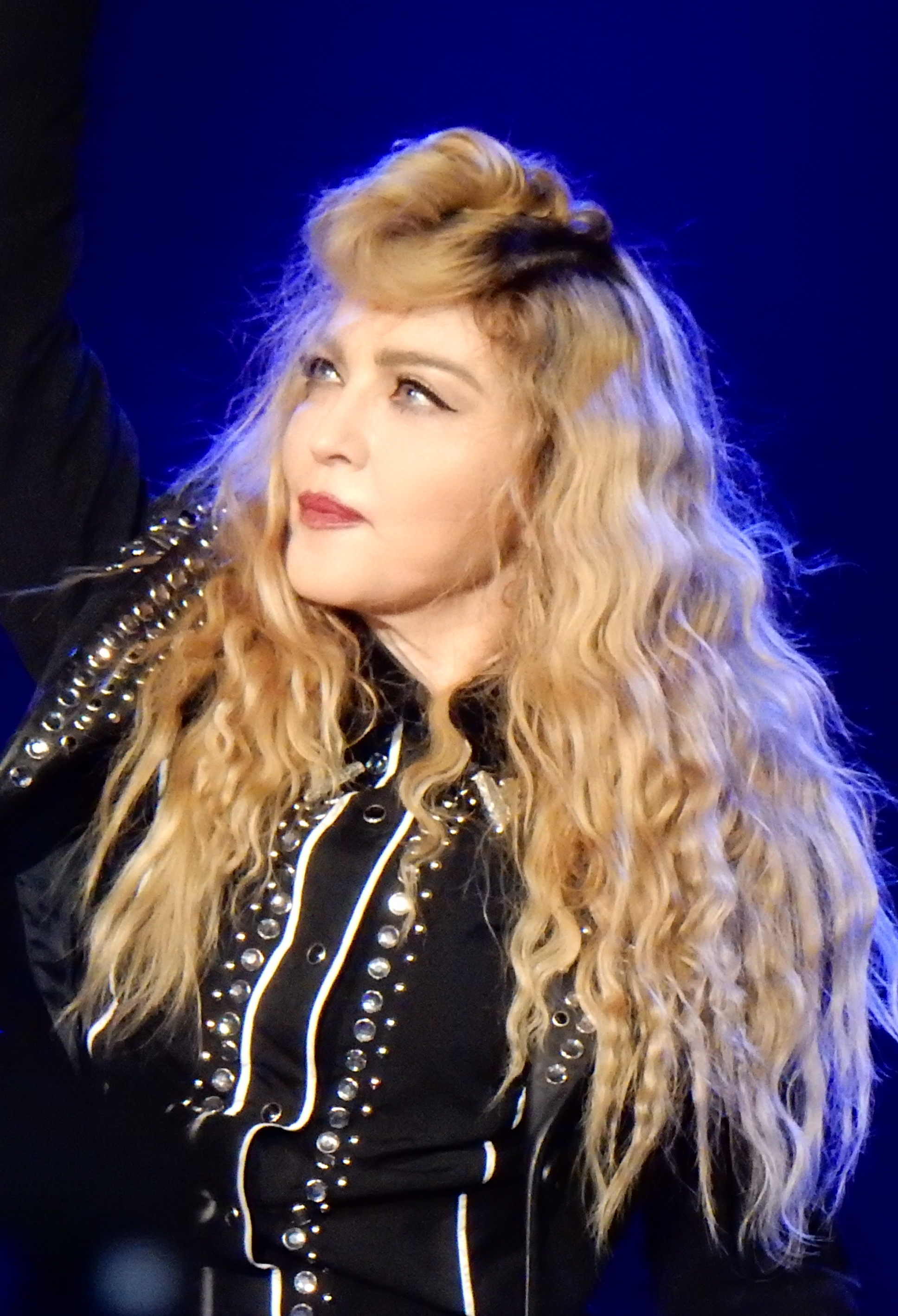
Madonna holds the record for the most number-one singles by a female artist during the decade. She topped the chart for a fifth time in 2008 with "4 Minutes" featuring Justin Timberlake.

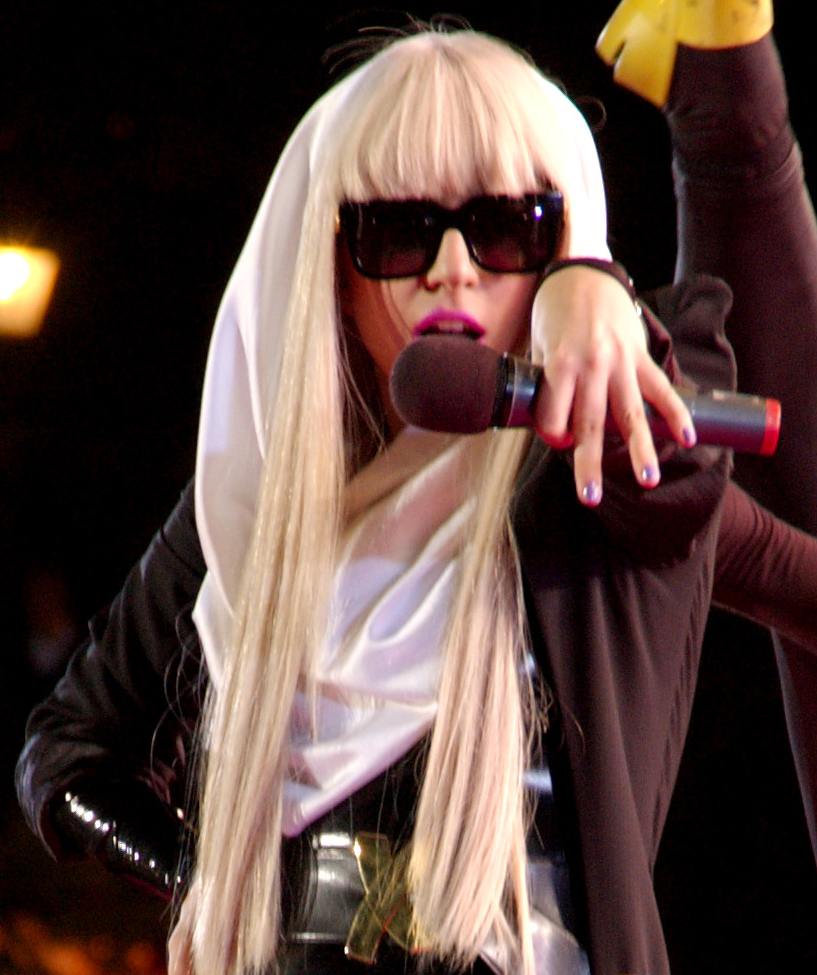
Lady Gaga became the first female artist to score three number ones in a single year, with "Just Dance", "Poker Face" and "Bad Romance" all topping the chart in 2009.

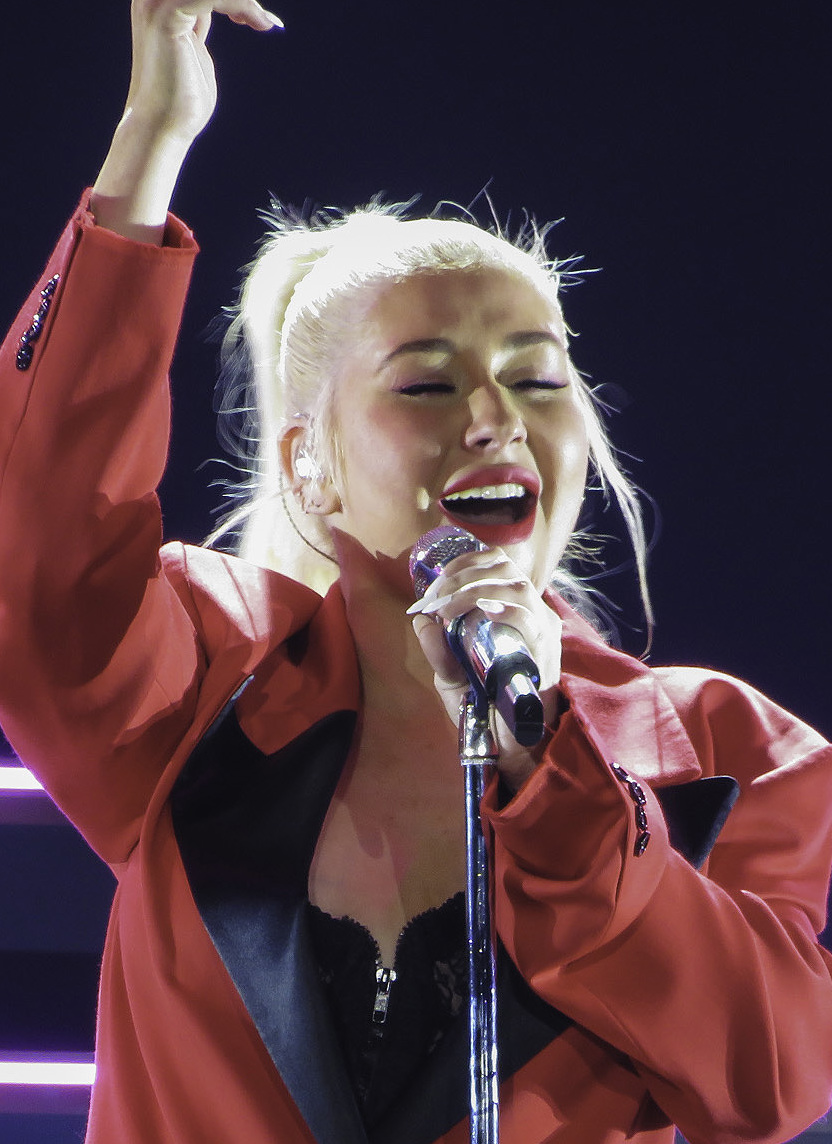
Christina Aguilera gained three number-one singles in the 2000s and one in 1999.

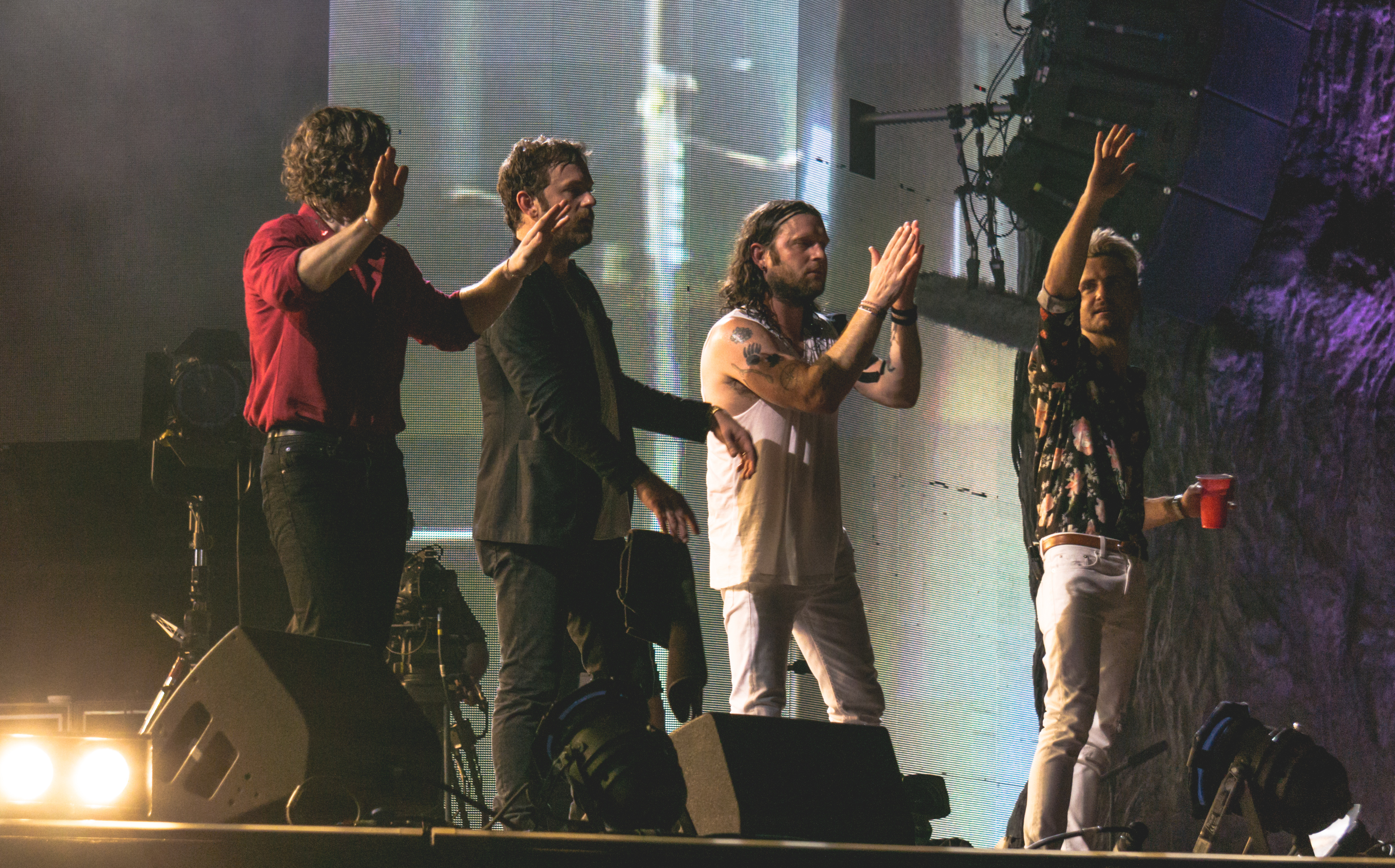
Kings of Leon's "Sex on Fire" sold over 840,000 copies in 2008, making it one of the biggest songs of 2008 and the biggest hit by any American act during the 2000s. It spent a total of 68 weeks in the UK chart.

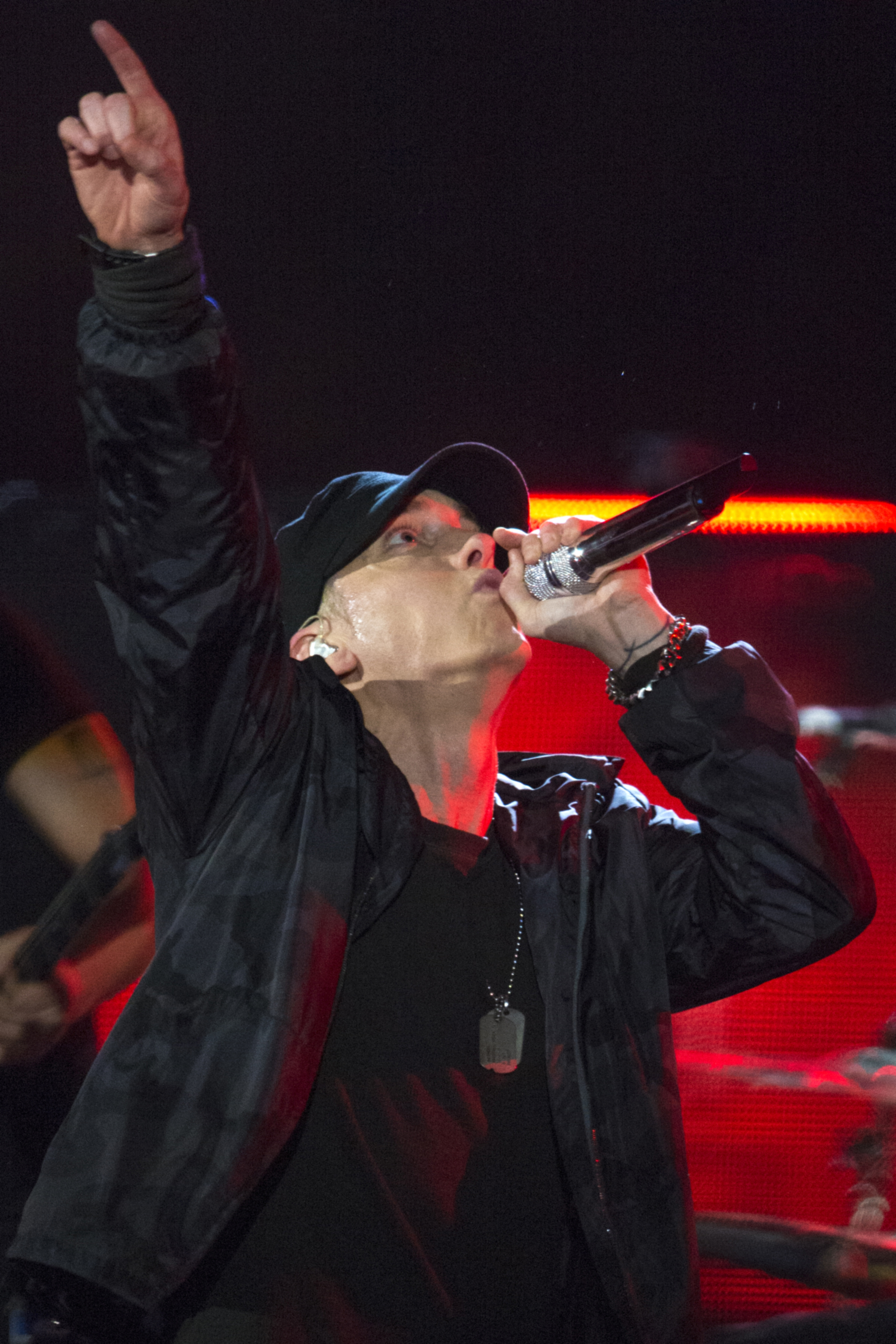
Rapper Eminem scored 7 number-one hits in 2000s, putting him second behind Westlife for the most number-ones during the decade.

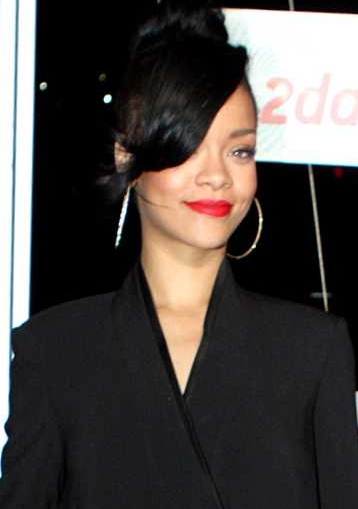
Rihanna had a 10-week run at the top of the UK singles chart, along with Jay-Z, with "Umbrella".

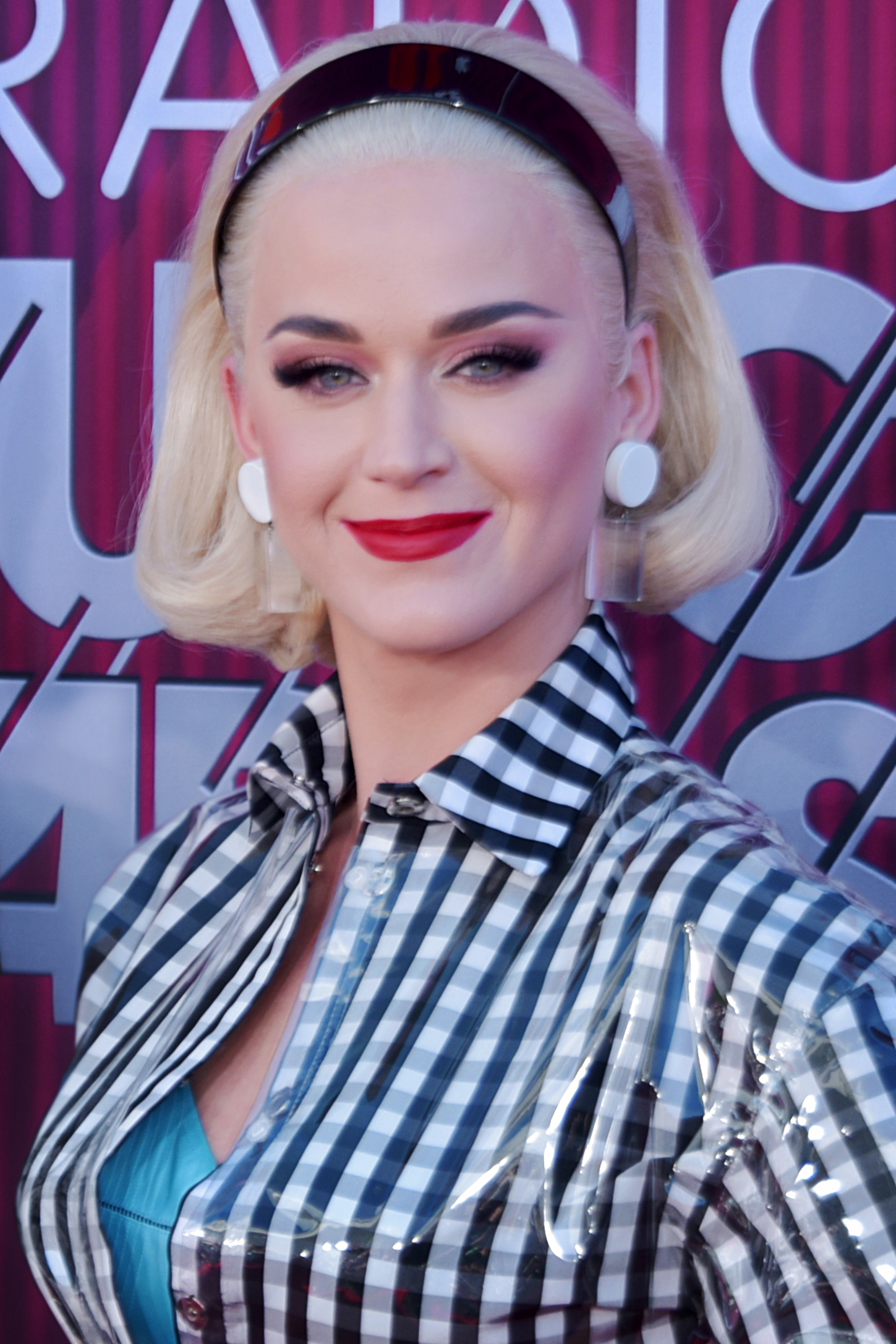
Katy Perry's "I Kissed a Girl" was one of the best-selling singles in 2008.

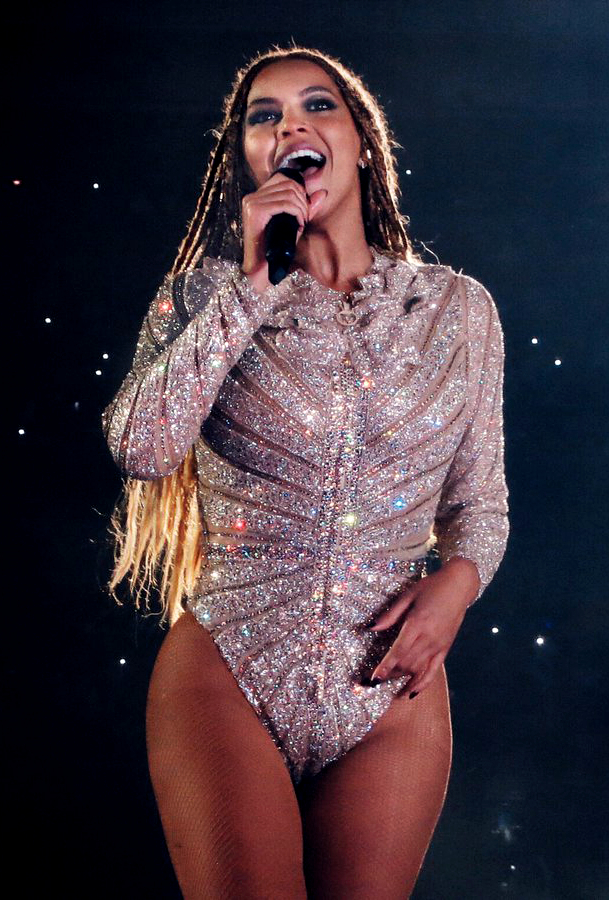
Beyoncé scored 6 number ones in the 2000s—two with Destiny's Child and four solo.

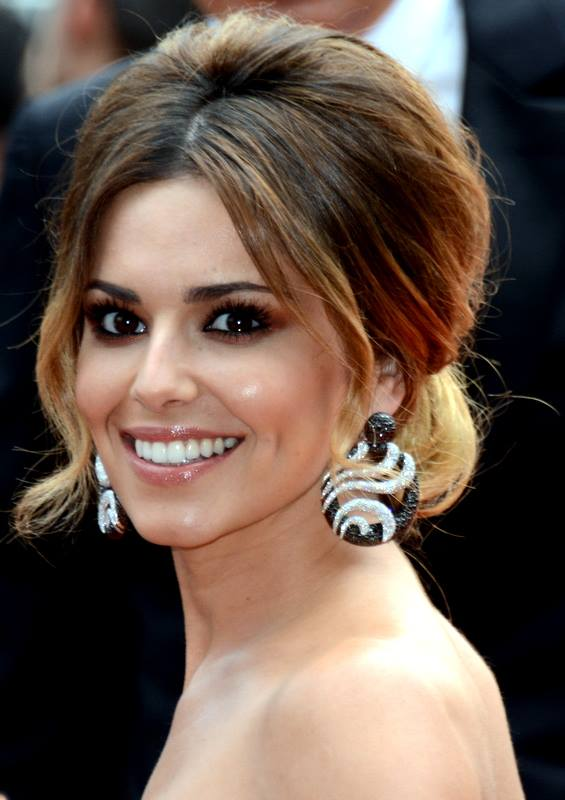
Cheryl scored 5 number-ones since the middle of decade; four as a Girls Aloud member and one solo.

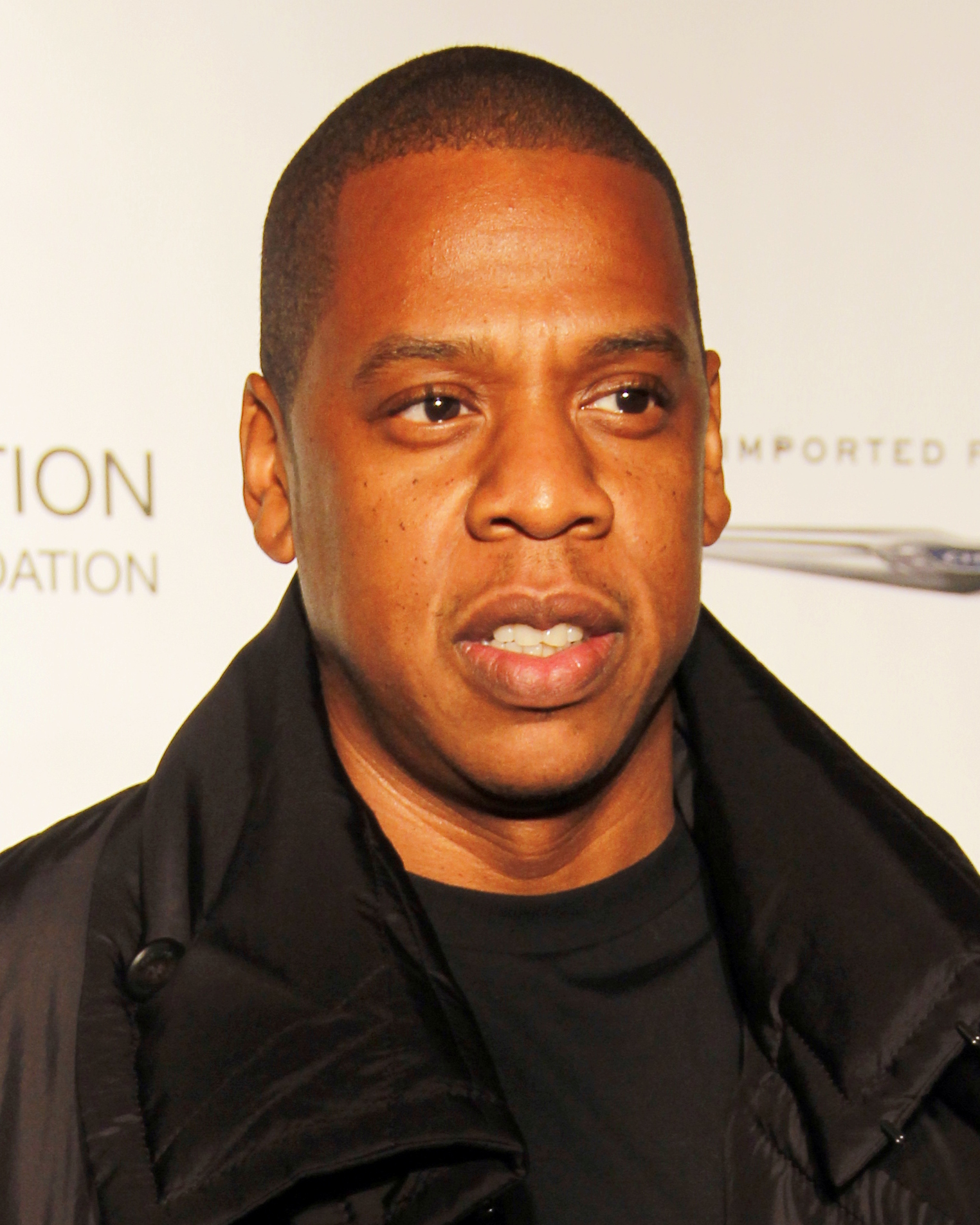
Rapper Jay-Z was 15 weeks at the top spot, the most in this decade.

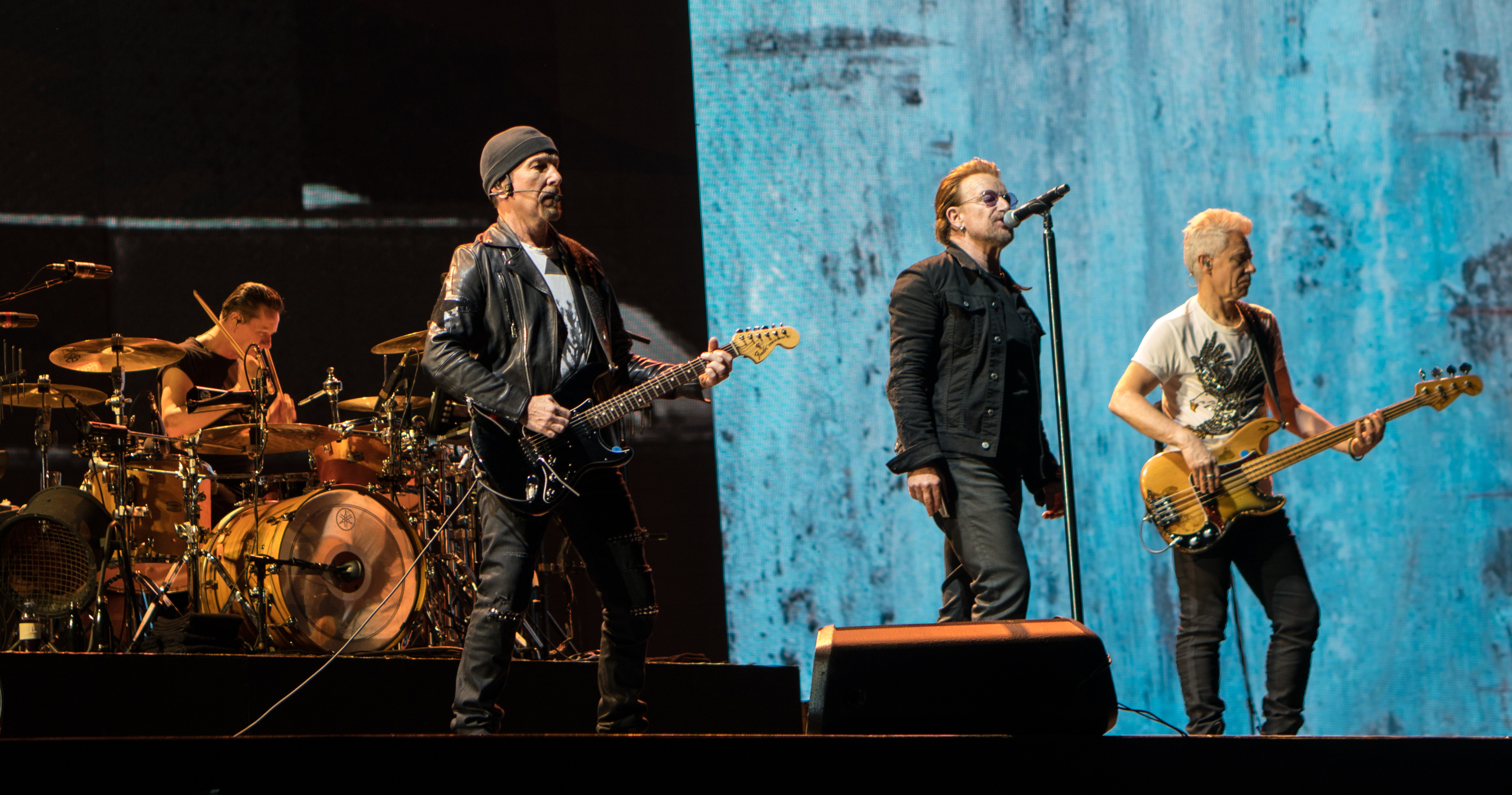
Irish band U2 scored four number-ones in this decade.

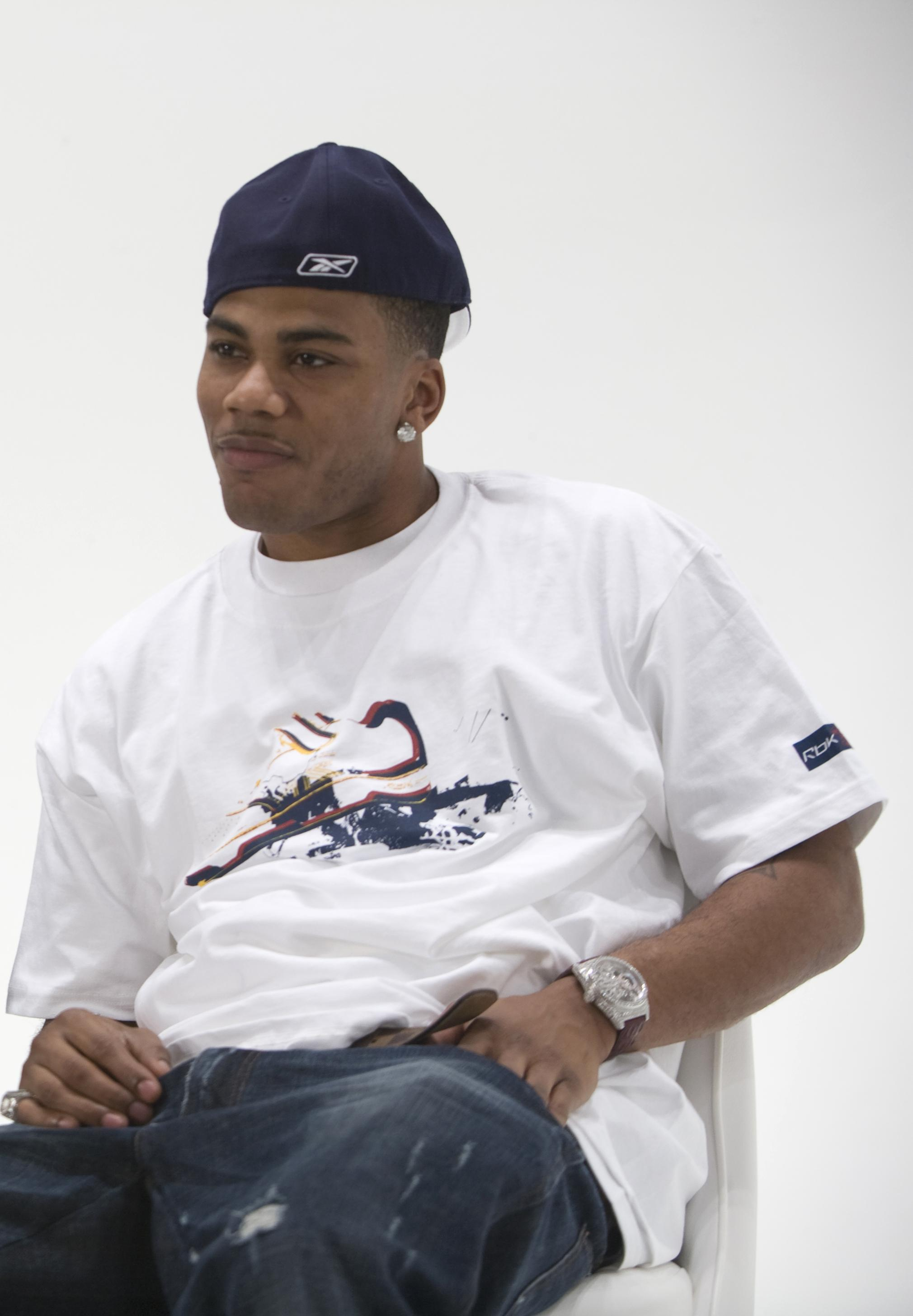
Rapper Nelly scored four number-ones this decade.

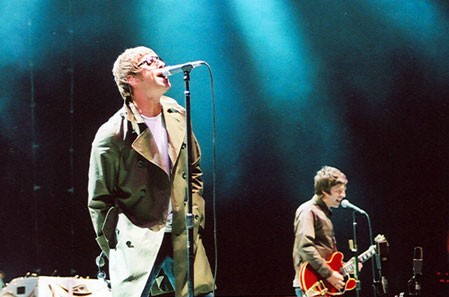
Mancunian rockers Oasis scored 4 number-ones this decade.

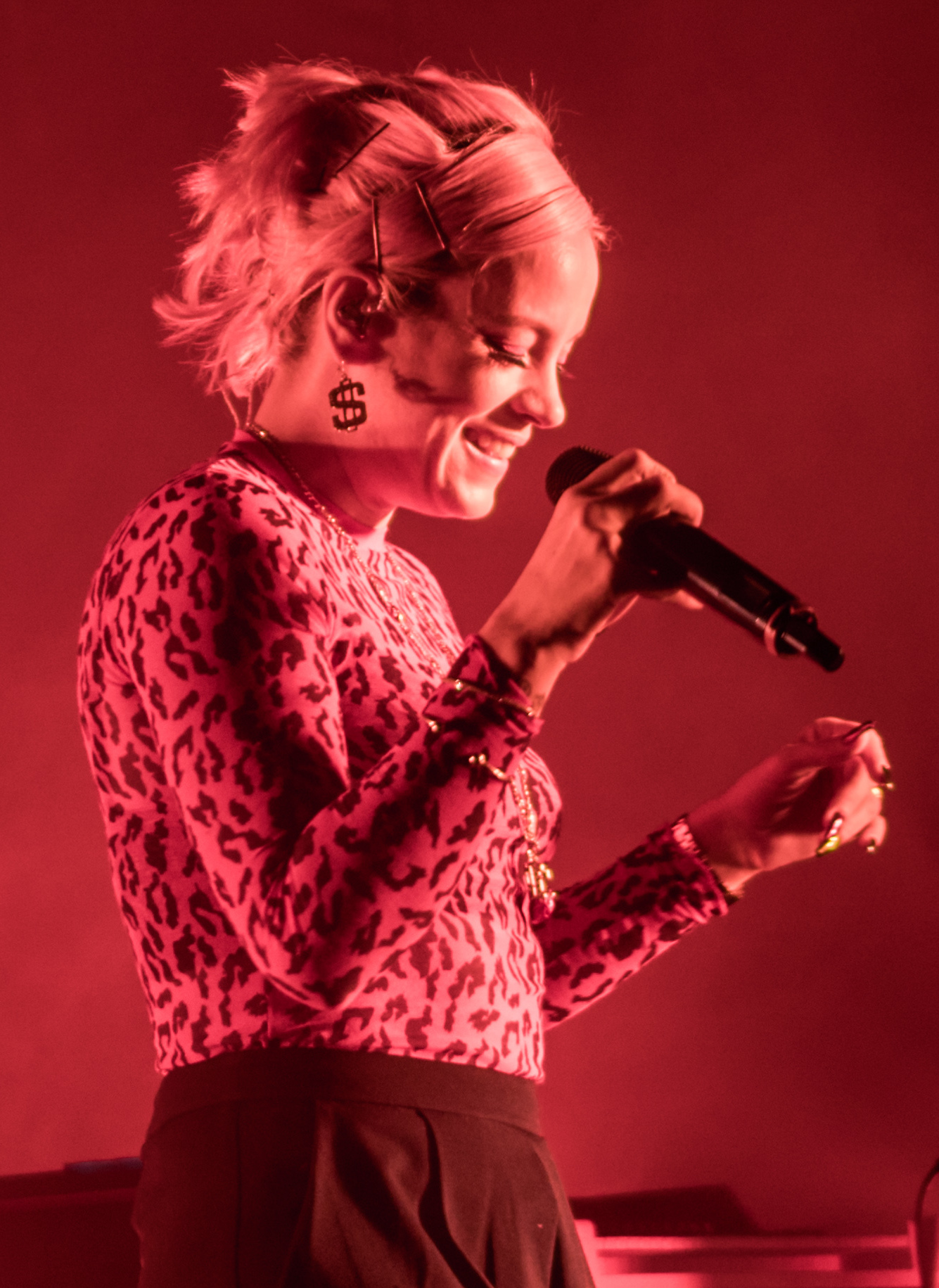
Lily Allen scored two number one singles this decade: "Smile" in 2006 and "The Fear" in 2009, which stayed for four consecutive weeks at the top, being the longest running number one in 2009.

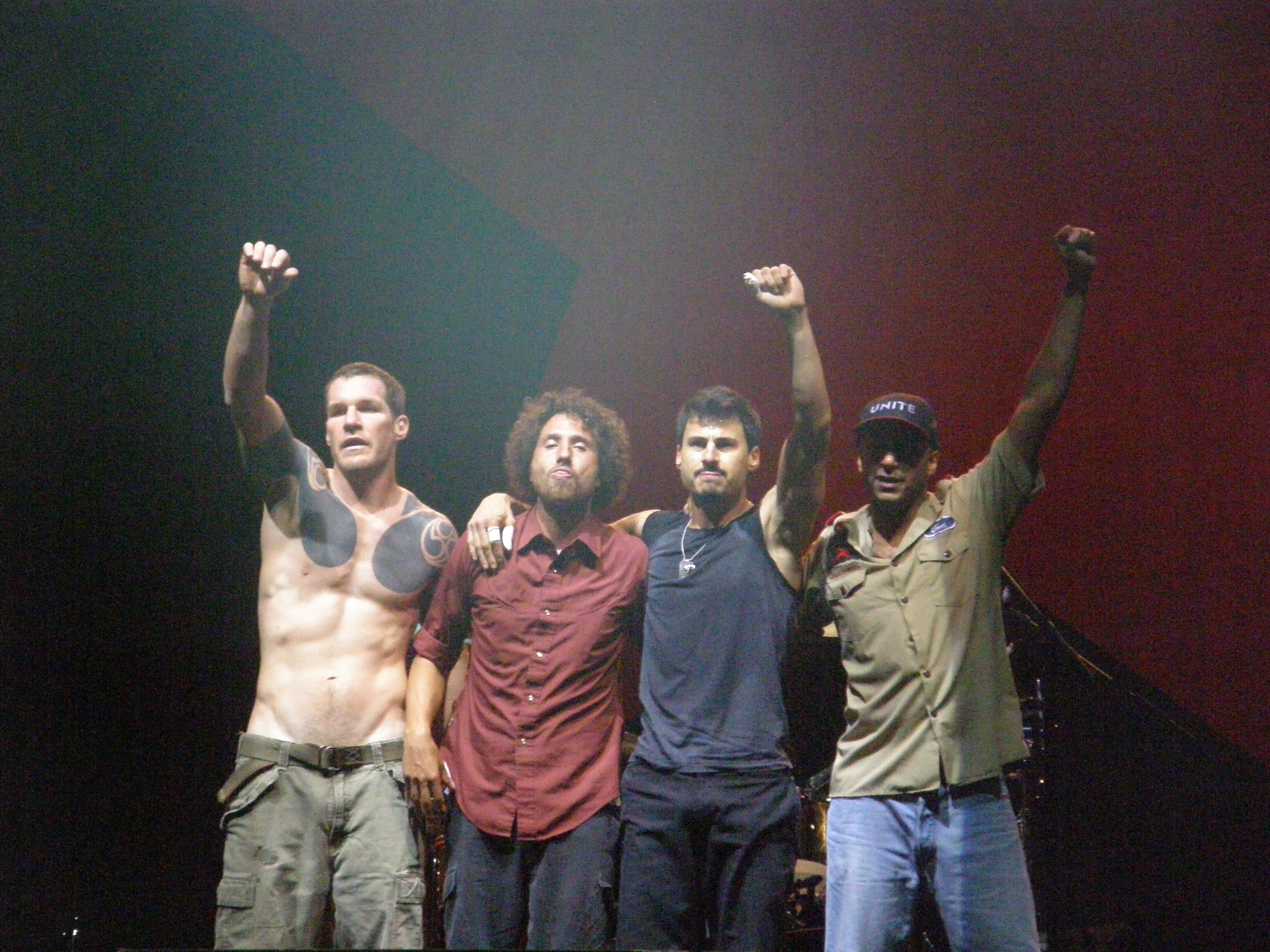
Rap metal band Rage Against the Machine scored the last Christmas number one of the decade and their first UK number one with "Killing in the Name" after a successful Facebook campaign by DJ Jon Morter to stop another The X Factor winner's single dominating the Christmas charts.

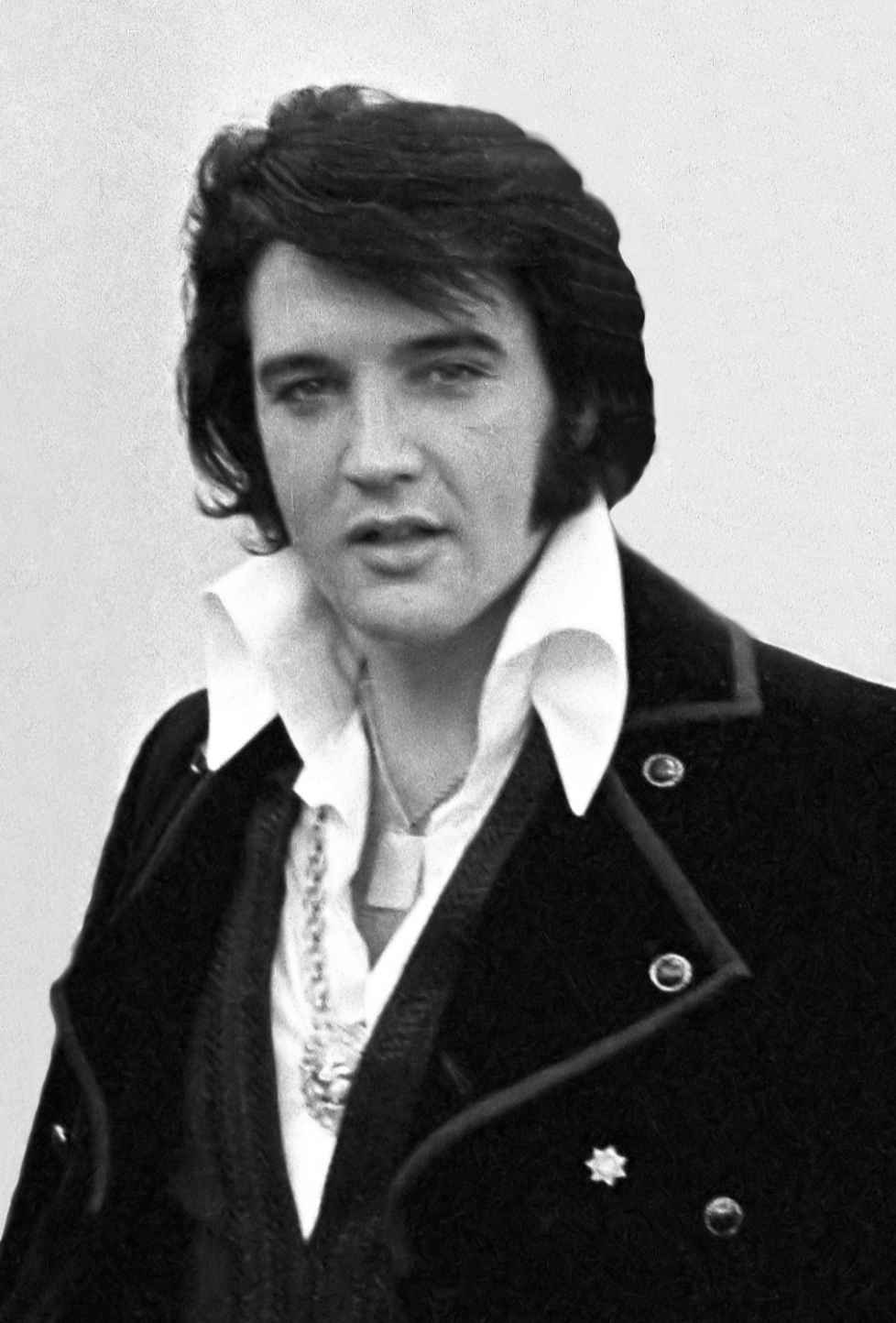
Elvis Presley scored four posthumous number ones, in 2002 on Junkie XL's remix of "A Little Less Conversation", and then in 2005 with "Jailhouse Rock", "I Got Stung" and "It's Now or Never" when all his number one singles were reissued and re-released to celebrate fifty years of his music.

No.	Artist (Note: The artist, song name, date of number-one and duration are those given by the Official Charts Company.)	Single	Record label (Note: The record labels are those given by the OCC.)	Week ending date	Weeks at number one	Certification (Note: The certifications are those given by the British Phonographic Industry.)
2000
844	Westlife	"I Have a Dream" / "Seasons in the Sun"	RCA	25 December 1999	4	Platinum
845	Manic Street Preachers	"The Masses Against the Classes"	Epic	22 January 2000	1	
846	Britney Spears	"Born to Make You Happy"	Jive	29 January 2000	1	Gold
847	Gabrielle	"Rise"	Go! Beat	5 February 2000	2	Platinum
848	Oasis	"Go Let It Out"	Big Brother	19 February 2000	1	Gold
849	All Saints	"Pure Shores"	London	26 February 2000	2	2× Platinum
850	Madonna	"American Pie"	Maverick	11 March 2000	1	Gold
851	Chicane featuring Bryan Adams	"Don't Give Up"	Xtravaganza	18 March 2000	1	Gold
852	Geri Halliwell	"Bag It Up"	EMI	25 March 2000	1	Silver
853	Melanie C featuring Lisa "Left Eye" Lopes	"Never Be the Same Again"	Virgin	1 April 2000	1	Gold
854	Westlife	"Fool Again"	RCA	8 April 2000	1	Silver
855	Craig David	"Fill Me In"	Wildstar	15 April 2000	1	Platinum
856	Fragma	"Toca's Miracle"	Positiva	22 April 2000	2	Platinum
857	Oxide & Neutrino	"Bound 4 da Reload (Casualty)"	East West	6 May 2000	1	
858	Britney Spears	"Oops!... I Did It Again"	Jive	13 May 2000	1	Platinum
859	Madison Avenue	"Don't Call Me Baby"	VC Recordings	20 May 2000	1	Platinum
860	Billie Piper	"Day & Night"	Innocent	27 May 2000	1	Silver
861	Sonique	"It Feels So Good"	Universal	3 June 2000	3	Platinum
862	Black Legend	"You See the Trouble with Me"	Eternal	24 June 2000	1	Silver
863	Kylie Minogue	"Spinning Around"	Parlophone	1 July 2000	1	Gold
864	Eminem	"The Real Slim Shady"	Interscope	8 July 2000	1	4× Platinum
865	The Corrs	"Breathless"	Atlantic	15 July 2000	1	Platinum
866	Ronan Keating	"Life Is a Rollercoaster"	Polydor	22 July 2000	1	Platinum
867	Five and Queen	"We Will Rock You"	RCA	29 July 2000	1	2× Platinum
868	Craig David	"7 Days"	Wildstar	5 August 2000	1	2× Platinum
869	Robbie Williams	"Rock DJ"	Chrysalis	12 August 2000	1	2× Platinum
870	Melanie C	"I Turn to You"	Virgin	19 August 2000	1	Gold
871	Spiller featuring Sophie Ellis-Bextor	"Groovejet (If This Ain't Love)"	Positiva	26 August 2000	1	Platinum
872	Madonna	"Music"	Maverick	2 September 2000	1	Gold
873	A1	"Take On Me"	Columbia	9 September 2000	1	Silver
874	Modjo	"Lady (Hear Me Tonight)"	Polydor	16 September 2000	2	Platinum
875	Mariah Carey featuring Westlife	"Against All Odds"	Columbia	30 September 2000	2	Gold
876	All Saints	"Black Coffee"	London	14 October 2000	1	Silver
877	U2	"Beautiful Day"	Island	21 October 2000	1	Platinum
878	Steps	"Stomp"	Jive	28 October 2000	1	Silver
879	Spice Girls	"Holler" / "Let Love Lead the Way"	Virgin	4 November 2000	1	Silver
880	Westlife	"My Love"	RCA	11 November 2000	1	Gold
881	A1	"Same Old Brand New You"	Columbia	18 November 2000	1	Silver
882	LeAnn Rimes	"Can't Fight the Moonlight"	Curb/London	25 November 2000	1	Platinum
883	Destiny's Child	"Independent Women Part I"	Columbia	2 December 2000	1	Platinum
884	S Club 7	"Never Had a Dream Come True"	Polydor	9 December 2000	1	Platinum
885	Eminem	"Stan"	Interscope	16 December 2000	1	4× Platinum
886	Bob the Builder	"Can We Fix It?" †	BBC Music	23 December 2000	3	Platinum
2001
887	Rui da Silva featuring Cassandra	"Touch Me"	Arista	13 January 2001	1	Platinum
888	Jennifer Lopez	"Love Don't Cost a Thing"	Epic	20 January 2001	1	Gold
889	Limp Bizkit	"Rollin'"	Interscope	27 January 2001	2	Platinum
890	Atomic Kitten	"Whole Again"	Innocent	10 February 2001	4	2× Platinum
891	Shaggy featuring RikRok	"It Wasn't Me" †	MCA	10 March 2001	1	4× Platinum
892	Westlife	"Uptown Girl"	RCA	17 March 2001	1	2× Platinum
893	Hear'Say	"Pure and Simple"	Polydor	24 March 2001	3	2× Platinum
894	Emma Bunton	"What Took You So Long?"	Virgin	14 April 2001	2	Silver
895	Destiny's Child	"Survivor"	Columbia	28 April 2001	1	Platinum
896	S Club 7	"Don't Stop Movin'"	Polydor	5 May 2001	1	2× Platinum
897	Geri Halliwell	"It's Raining Men"	EMI	12 May 2001	2	Gold
re	S Club 7	"Don't Stop Movin'"	Polydor	26 May 2001	1	2× Platinum
898	DJ Pied Piper and the Masters of Ceremonies	"Do You Really Like It?"	Relentless/Ministry of Sound	2 June 2001	1	Platinum
899	Shaggy featuring Rayvon	"Angel"	MCA	9 June 2001	3	Gold
900	Christina Aguilera, Lil' Kim, Mýa and Pink	"Lady Marmalade"	Interscope	30 June 2001	1	2× Platinum
901	Hear'Say	"The Way to Your Love"	Polydor	7 July 2001	1	Silver
902	Roger Sanchez	"Another Chance"	Defected	14 July 2001	1	Platinum
903	Robbie Williams	"Eternity" / "The Road to Mandalay"	Chrysalis	21 July 2001	2	Gold
904	Atomic Kitten	"Eternal Flame"	Innocent	4 August 2001	2	Gold
905	So Solid Crew	"21 Seconds"	Relentless	18 August 2001	1	Platinum
906	Five	"Let's Dance"	RCA	25 August 2001	2	Silver
907	Blue	"Too Close"	Innocent	8 September 2001	1	Silver
908	Bob the Builder	"Mambo No. 5"	BBC Music	15 September 2001	1	Gold
909	DJ Ötzi	"Hey Baby"	EMI	22 September 2001	1	Platinum
910	Kylie Minogue	"Can't Get You Out of My Head"	Parlophone	29 September 2001	4	3× Platinum
911	Afroman	"Because I Got High"	Universal	27 October 2001	3	Platinum
912	Westlife	"Queen of My Heart"	RCA	17 November 2001	1	Gold
913	Blue	"If You Come Back"	Innocent	24 November 2001	1	Silver
914	S Club 7	"Have You Ever"	Polydor	1 December 2001	1	Gold
915	Daniel Bedingfield	"Gotta Get Thru This"	Relentless	8 December 2001	2	2× Platinum
916	Robbie Williams and Nicole Kidman	"Somethin' Stupid"	Chrysalis	22 December 2001	3	Gold
2002
re	Daniel Bedingfield	"Gotta Get Thru This"	Relentless	12 January 2002	1	2× Platinum
917	Aaliyah	"More Than a Woman"	Virgin	19 January 2002	1	Silver
918	George Harrison	"My Sweet Lord" (reissue)	Parlophone	26 January 2002	1	Platinum
919	Enrique Iglesias	"Hero"	Interscope	2 February 2002	4	2× Platinum
920	Westlife	"World of Our Own"	S	2 March 2002	1	Platinum
921	Will Young	"Anything Is Possible" / "Evergreen" ‡	S	9 March 2002	3	3× Platinum
922	Gareth Gates	"Unchained Melody"	S	30 March 2002	4	2× Platinum
923	Oasis	"The Hindu Times"	Big Brother	27 April 2002	1	Silver
924	Sugababes	"Freak like Me"	Island	4 May 2002	1	Gold
925	Holly Valance	"Kiss Kiss"	London	11 May 2002	1	Gold
926	Ronan Keating	"If Tomorrow Never Comes"	Polydor	18 May 2002	1	Platinum
927	Liberty X	"Just a Little"	V2	25 May 2002	1	Platinum
928	Eminem	"Without Me"	Interscope	1 June 2002	1	4× Platinum
929	Will Young	"Light My Fire"	S	8 June 2002	2	Gold
930	Elvis vs. JXL	"A Little Less Conversation"	RCA	22 June 2002	4	2× Platinum
931	Gareth Gates	"Anyone of Us (Stupid Mistake)"	S	20 July 2002	3	Platinum
932	Darius	"Colourblind"	Mercury	10 August 2002	2	Gold
933	Sugababes	"Round Round"	Island	24 August 2002	1	Gold
934	Blazin' Squad	"Crossroads"	East West	31 August 2002	1	Silver
935	Atomic Kitten	"The Tide Is High (Get the Feeling)"	Innocent	7 September 2002	3	Platinum
936	Pink	"Just Like a Pill"	Arista	28 September 2002	1	Platinum
937	Will Young and Gareth Gates	"The Long and Winding Road" / "Suspicious Minds"	S	5 October 2002	2	Gold
938	Las Ketchup	"The Ketchup Song"	Columbia	19 October 2002	1	Platinum
939	Nelly featuring Kelly Rowland	"Dilemma"	Universal	26 October 2002	2	3× Platinum
940	DJ Sammy and Yanou featuring Do	"Heaven"	Data/Ministry of Sound	9 November 2002	1	2× Platinum
941	Westlife	"Unbreakable"	S	16 November 2002	1	Silver
942	Christina Aguilera featuring Redman	"Dirrty"	RCA	23 November 2002	2	Platinum
943	Daniel Bedingfield	"If You're Not the One"	Polydor	7 December 2002	1	Platinum
944	Eminem	"Lose Yourself"	Interscope	14 December 2002	1	5× Platinum
945	Blue featuring Elton John	"Sorry Seems to Be the Hardest Word"	Innocent	21 December 2002	1	Gold
946	Girls Aloud	"Sound of the Underground"	Polydor	28 December 2002	4	Platinum
2003
947	David Sneddon	"Stop Living the Lie"	Mercury	25 January 2003	2	Silver
948	t.A.T.u.	"All the Things She Said"	Interscope	8 February 2003	4	Platinum
949	Christina Aguilera	"Beautiful"	RCA	8 March 2003	2	Platinum
950	Gareth Gates featuring The Kumars	"Spirit in the Sky"	S	22 March 2003	2	Platinum
951	Room 5 featuring Oliver Cheatham	"Make Luv"	Positiva	5 April 2003	4	Platinum
952	Busted	"You Said No"	Universal	3 May 2003	1	
953	Tomcraft	"Loneliness"	Data/Ministry of Sound	10 May 2003	1	Silver
954	R. Kelly	"Ignition"	Jive	17 May 2003	4	3× Platinum
955	Evanescence	"Bring Me to Life"	Epic	14 June 2003	4	3× Platinum
956	Beyoncé featuring Jay-Z	"Crazy in Love"	Columbia	12 July 2003	3	4× Platinum
957	Daniel Bedingfield	"Never Gonna Leave Your Side"	Polydor	2 August 2003	1	
958	Blu Cantrell featuring Sean Paul	"Breathe"	Arista	9 August 2003	4	2× Platinum
959	Elton John	"Are You Ready for Love"	Southern Fried	6 September 2003	1	Platinum
960	The Black Eyed Peas	"Where Is the Love?" †	A&M	13 September 2003	6	Platinum
961	Sugababes	"Hole in the Head"	Island	25 October 2003	1	Silver
962	Fatman Scoop featuring the Crooklyn Clan	"Be Faithful"	Def Jam	1 November 2003	2	Gold
963	Kylie Minogue	"Slow"	Parlophone	15 November 2003	1	Silver
964	Busted	"Crashed the Wedding"	Universal	22 November 2003	1	Silver
965	Westlife	"Mandy"	S	29 November 2003	1	Silver
966	Will Young	"Leave Right Now"	S	6 December 2003	2	Platinum
967	Ozzy and Kelly Osbourne	"Changes"	Sanctuary	20 December 2003	1	Gold
968	Michael Andrews featuring Gary Jules	"Mad World"	Adventure/Sanctuary	27 December 2003	3	Platinum
2004
969	Michelle	"All This Time"	S	17 January 2004	3	Silver
970	LMC vs. U2	"Take Me to the Clouds Above"	AATW	7 February 2004	2	Platinum
971	Sam & Mark	"With a Little Help from My Friends"	19	21 February 2004	1	
972	Busted	"Who's David?"	Universal	28 February 2004	1	Silver
973	Peter Andre featuring Bubbler Ranx	"Mysterious Girl"	A&E	6 March 2004	1	Platinum
974	Britney Spears	"Toxic"	Jive	13 March 2004	1	2× Platinum
975	DJ Casper	"Cha Cha Slide"	AATW	20 March 2004	1	Platinum
976	Usher featuring Lil Jon and Ludacris	"Yeah!"	Arista	27 March 2004	2	3× Platinum
977	McFly	"5 Colours in Her Hair"	Universal	10 April 2004	2	Silver
978	Eamon	"Fuck It (I Don't Want You Back)"	Jive	24 April 2004	4	Platinum
979	Frankee	"F.U.R.B. (Fuck You Right Back)"	AATW	22 May 2004	3	Silver
980	Mario Winans featuring Enya and P. Diddy	"I Don't Wanna Know"	Bad Boy	12 June 2004	2	Silver
981	Britney Spears	"Everytime"	Jive	26 June 2004	1	Platinum
982	McFly	"Obviously"	Universal	3 July 2004	1	Platinum
983	Usher	"Burn"	Laface	10 July 2004	2	Platinum
984	The Shapeshifters	"Lola's Theme"	Positiva	24 July 2004	1	Platinum
985	The Streets	"Dry Your Eyes"	679/Locked On	31 July 2004	1	Platinum
986	Busted	"Thunderbirds" / "3AM"	Universal	7 August 2004	2	Silver
987	3 of a Kind	"Baby Cakes"	Relentless	21 August 2004	1	Platinum
988	Natasha Bedingfield	"These Words"	Phonogenic	28 August 2004	2	Platinum
989	Nelly	"My Place" / "Flap Your Wings"	Universal	11 September 2004	1	Silver
990	Brian McFadden	"Real to Me"	Modest/Sony Music	18 September 2004	1	
991	Eric Prydz	"Call on Me"	Data	25 September 2004	3	2× Platinum
992	Robbie Williams	"Radio"	Chrysalis	16 October 2004	1	
re	Eric Prydz	"Call on Me"	Data	23 October 2004	2	2× Platinum
993	Ja Rule featuring R. Kelly and Ashanti	"Wonderful"	Def Jam	6 November 2004	1	Silver
994	Eminem	"Just Lose It"	Interscope	13 November 2004	1	Platinum
995	U2	"Vertigo"	Island	20 November 2004	1	Gold
996	Girls Aloud	"I'll Stand by You"	Polydor	27 November 2004	2	Silver
997	Band Aid 20	"Do They Know It's Christmas?" †	Mercury	11 December 2004	4	2× Platinum
2005
998	Steve Brookstein	"Against All Odds"	Syco	8 January 2005	1	
999	Elvis Presley	"Jailhouse Rock" (reissue)	RCA	15 January 2005	1	Platinum
1000	Elvis Presley	"One Night" / "I Got Stung" (reissue)	RCA	22 January 2005	1	
1001	Ciara featuring Petey Pablo	"Goodies"	Laface	29 January 2005	1	Silver
1002	Elvis Presley	"It's Now or Never" (reissue)	RCA	5 February 2005	1	Gold
1003	Eminem	"Like Toy Soldiers"	Interscope	12 February 2005	1	Platinum
1004	U2	"Sometimes You Can't Make It on Your Own"	Island	19 February 2005	1	Silver
1005	Jennifer Lopez	"Get Right"	Epic	26 February 2005	1	Platinum
1006	Nelly featuring Tim McGraw	"Over and Over"	Curb/Universal	5 March 2005	1	Silver
1007	Stereophonics	"Dakota"	V2	12 March 2005	1	3× Platinum
1008	McFly	"All About You" / "You've Got a Friend"	Island	19 March 2005	1	Platinum
1009	Tony Christie featuring Peter Kay	"(Is This the Way to) Amarillo" †	Universal Music TV	26 March 2005	7	2× Platinum
1010	Akon	"Lonely"	Universal	14 May 2005	2	Platinum
1011	Oasis	"Lyla"	Big Brother	28 May 2005	1	Gold
1012	Crazy Frog	"Axel F"	Gusto	4 June 2005	4	Platinum
1013	2Pac featuring Elton John	"Ghetto Gospel"	Interscope	2 July 2005	3	Platinum
1014	James Blunt	"You're Beautiful"	Atlantic	23 July 2005	5	2× Platinum
1015	McFly	"I'll Be OK"	Island	27 August 2005	1	
1016	Oasis	"The Importance of Being Idle"	Big Brother	3 September 2005	1	Platinum
1017	Gorillaz	"Dare"	Parlophone	10 September 2005	1	Platinum
1018	The Pussycat Dolls featuring Busta Rhymes	"Don't Cha"	A&M	17 September 2005	3	2× Platinum
1019	Sugababes	"Push the Button"	Island	8 October 2005	3	Platinum
1020	Arctic Monkeys	"I Bet You Look Good on the Dancefloor"	Domino	29 October 2005	1	4× Platinum
1021	Westlife	"You Raise Me Up"	S	5 November 2005	2	Platinum
1022	Madonna	"Hung Up"	Warner Bros.	19 November 2005	3	Platinum
1023	The Pussycat Dolls	"Stickwitu"	A&M	10 December 2005	2	Gold
1024	Nizlopi	"JCB"	FDM	24 December 2005	1	Platinum
1025	Shayne Ward	"That's My Goal"	Syco	31 December 2005	4	2× Platinum
2006
1026	Arctic Monkeys	"When the Sun Goes Down"	Domino	28 January 2006	1	3× Platinum
1027	The Notorious B.I.G. featuring Diddy, Nelly, Jagged Edge and Avery Storm	"Nasty Girl"	Bad Boy	4 February 2006	2	Platinum
1028	Meck featuring Leo Sayer	"Thunder in My Heart Again"	Apollo/Free2air	18 February 2006	2	Silver
1029	Madonna	"Sorry"	Warner Bros.	4 March 2006	1	Silver
1030	Chico	"It's Chico Time"	Sony BMG	11 March 2006	2	
1031	Orson	"No Tomorrow"	Mercury	25 March 2006	1	Gold
1032	Ne-Yo	"So Sick"	Def Jam	1 April 2006	1	2× Platinum
1033	Gnarls Barkley	"Crazy" †	Warner Bros.	8 April 2006	9	4× Platinum
1034	Sandi Thom	"I Wish I Was a Punk Rocker (With Flowers in My Hair)"	Viking Legacy	10 June 2006	1	Gold
1035	Nelly Furtado	"Maneater"	Geffen	17 June 2006	3	2× Platinum
1036	Shakira featuring Wyclef Jean	"Hips Don't Lie"	Epic	8 July 2006	1	4× Platinum
1037	Lily Allen	"Smile"	Regal Recordings	15 July 2006	2	2× Platinum
1038	McFly	"Don't Stop Me Now" / "Please, Please"	Island	29 July 2006	1	
re	Shakira featuring Wyclef Jean	"Hips Don't Lie"	Epic	5 August 2006	4	4× Platinum
1039	Beyoncé featuring Jay-Z	"Déjà Vu"	Columbia	2 September 2006	1	Gold
1040	Justin Timberlake	"SexyBack"	Jive	9 September 2006	1	2× Platinum
1041	Scissor Sisters	"I Don't Feel Like Dancin'"	Polydor	16 September 2006	4	2× Platinum
1042	Razorlight	"America"	Vertigo	14 October 2006	1	2× Platinum
1043	My Chemical Romance	"Welcome to the Black Parade"	Reprise	21 October 2006	2	2× Platinum
1044	McFly	"Star Girl"	Island	4 November 2006	1	Platinum
1045	Fedde Le Grand	"Put Your Hands Up for Detroit"	Data	11 November 2006	1	Gold
1046	Westlife	"The Rose"	S	18 November 2006	1	Silver
1047	Akon featuring Eminem	"Smack That"	Universal	25 November 2006	1	2× Platinum
1048	Take That	"Patience"	Polydor	2 December 2006	4	2× Platinum
1049	Leona Lewis	"A Moment Like This"	Syco	30 December 2006	4	Platinum
2007
1050	Mika	"Grace Kelly"	Casablanca/Island	27 January 2007	5	2× Platinum
1051	Kaiser Chiefs	"Ruby"	B-Unique/Polydor	3 March 2007	1	2× Platinum
1052	Take That	"Shine"	Polydor	10 March 2007	2	2× Platinum
1053	Sugababes vs. Girls Aloud	"Walk This Way"	Fascination/Island	24 March 2007	1	
1054	The Proclaimers featuring Brian Potter and Andy Pipkin	"I'm Gonna Be (500 Miles)"	EMI	31 March 2007	3	Silver
1055	Timbaland featuring Nelly Furtado and Justin Timberlake	"Give It to Me"	Interscope	21 April 2007	1	Platinum
1056	Beyoncé and Shakira	"Beautiful Liar"	Columbia	28 April 2007	3	Platinum
1057	McFly	"Baby's Coming Back" / "Transylvania"	Island	19 May 2007	1	
1058	Rihanna featuring Jay-Z	"Umbrella"	Def Jam	26 May 2007	10	4× Platinum
1059	Timbaland featuring Keri Hilson	"The Way I Are"	Interscope	4 August 2007	2	2× Platinum
1060	Robyn with Kleerup	"With Every Heartbeat"	Konichiwa	18 August 2007	1	Platinum
1061	Kanye West	"Stronger"	Roc-A-Fella	25 August 2007	2	3× Platinum
1062	Sean Kingston	"Beautiful Girls"	Beluga Heights	8 September 2007	4	2× Platinum
1063	Sugababes	"About You Now"	Island	6 October 2007	4	2× Platinum
1064	Leona Lewis	"Bleeding Love" †	Syco	3 November 2007	7	3× Platinum
1065	Katie Melua and Eva Cassidy	"What a Wonderful World"	Dramatico	22 December 2007	1	
1066	Leon Jackson	"When You Believe"	Syco	29 December 2007	3	Gold
2008
1067	Basshunter featuring DJ Mental Theo's Bazzheadz	"Now You're Gone"	Hard2Beat	19 January 2008	5	2× Platinum
1068	Duffy	"Mercy"	A&M	23 February 2008	5	2× Platinum
1069	Estelle featuring Kanye West	"American Boy"	Atlantic/HomeSchool	29 March 2008	4	3× Platinum
1070	Madonna featuring Justin Timberlake	"4 Minutes"	Warner Bros.	26 April 2008	4	Platinum
1071	The Ting Tings	"That's Not My Name"	Columbia	24 May 2008	1	Platinum
1072	Rihanna	"Take a Bow"	Def Jam	31 May 2008	2	2× Platinum
1073	Mint Royale	"Singin' in the Rain"	Direction	14 June 2008	2	
1074	Coldplay	"Viva la Vida"	Parlophone	28 June 2008	1	6× Platinum
1075	Ne-Yo	"Closer"	Def Jam	5 July 2008	1	Platinum
1076	Dizzee Rascal featuring Calvin Harris and Chrome	"Dance wiv Me"	Dirtee Stank	12 July 2008	4	3× Platinum
1077	Kid Rock	"All Summer Long"	Atlantic	9 August 2008	1	Platinum
1078	Katy Perry	"I Kissed a Girl"	Virgin	16 August 2008	5	2× Platinum
1079	Kings of Leon	"Sex on Fire"	HandMeDown	20 September 2008	3	6× Platinum
1080	Pink	"So What"	Laface	11 October 2008	3	2× Platinum
1081	Girls Aloud	"The Promise"	Fascination	1 November 2008	1	Platinum
1082	The X Factor Finalists 2008	"Hero"	Syco	8 November 2008	3	2× Platinum
1083	Beyoncé	"If I Were a Boy"	Columbia	29 November 2008	1	2× Platinum
1084	Take That	"Greatest Day"	Polydor	6 December 2008	1	Platinum
1085	Leona Lewis	"Run"	Syco	13 December 2008	2	2× Platinum
1086	Alexandra Burke	"Hallelujah" †	Syco	27 December 2008	3	3× Platinum
2009
1087	Lady Gaga featuring Colby O'Donis	"Just Dance"	Interscope	17 January 2009	3	3× Platinum
1088	Lily Allen	"The Fear"	Regal Recordings	7 February 2009	4	Platinum
1089	Kelly Clarkson	"My Life Would Suck Without You"	RCA	7 March 2009	1	Platinum
1090	Flo Rida featuring Kesha	"Right Round"	Atlantic	14 March 2009	1	Platinum
1091	Vanessa Jenkins and Bryn West featuring Tom Jones and Robin Gibb	"(Barry) Islands in the Stream"	Mercury	21 March 2009	1	
1092	Lady Gaga	"Poker Face" †	Interscope	28 March 2009	3	3× Platinum
1093	Calvin Harris	"I'm Not Alone"	Columbia	18 April 2009	2	Platinum
1094	Tinchy Stryder featuring N-Dubz	"Number 1"	4th and Broadway	2 May 2009	3	2× Platinum
1095	The Black Eyed Peas	"Boom Boom Pow"	Interscope	23 May 2009	1	Platinum
1096	Dizzee Rascal featuring Armand Van Helden	"Bonkers"	Dirtee Stank	30 May 2009	2	2× Platinum
re	The Black Eyed Peas	"Boom Boom Pow"	Interscope	13 June 2009	1	Platinum
1097	Pixie Lott	"Mama Do (Uh Oh, Uh Oh)"	Mercury	20 June 2009	1	Gold
1098	David Guetta featuring Kelly Rowland	"When Love Takes Over"	Positiva	27 June 2009	1	2× Platinum
1099	La Roux	"Bulletproof"	Polydor	4 July 2009	1	Platinum
1100	Cascada	"Evacuate the Dancefloor"	AATW/Universal Music TV	11 July 2009	2	Platinum
1101	JLS	"Beat Again"	Epic	25 July 2009	2	Platinum
1102	The Black Eyed Peas	"I Gotta Feeling"	Interscope	8 August 2009	1	5× Platinum
1103	Tinchy Stryder featuring Amelle Berrabah	"Never Leave You"	Fourth and Broadway	15 August 2009	1	Gold
re	The Black Eyed Peas	"I Gotta Feeling"	Interscope	22 August 2009	1	5× Platinum
1104	David Guetta featuring Akon	"Sexy Chick"	Positiva/Virgin	29 August 2009	1	3× Platinum
1105	Dizzee Rascal featuring Chrome	"Holiday"	Dirtee Stank	5 September 2009	1	Platinum
1106	Jay-Z featuring Rihanna and Kanye West	"Run This Town"	Roc Nation	12 September 2009	1	2× Platinum
1107	Pixie Lott	"Boys and Girls"	Mercury	19 September 2009	1	Silver
1108	Taio Cruz	"Break Your Heart"	Island	26 September 2009	3	Platinum
1109	Chipmunk	"Oopsy Daisy"	Jive	17 October 2009	1	Platinum
1110	Alexandra Burke featuring Flo Rida	"Bad Boys"	Syco	24 October 2009	1	Platinum
1111	Cheryl Cole	"Fight for This Love"	Fascination	31 October 2009	2	2× Platinum
1112	JLS	"Everybody in Love"	Epic	14 November 2009	1	Platinum
1113	The Black Eyed Peas	"Meet Me Halfway"	Interscope	21 November 2009	1	2× Platinum
1114	The X Factor Finalists 2009	"You Are Not Alone"	Syco	28 November 2009	1	
1115	Peter Kay's Animated All Star Band	"The Official BBC Children in Need Medley"	Epic	5 December 2009	2	Gold
1116	Lady Gaga	"Bad Romance"	Interscope	19 December 2009	1	3× Platinum
1117	Rage Against the Machine	"Killing in the Name"	Epic	26 December 2009	1	2× Platinum

== Statistics by decade ==
=== By artist ===
The following artists achieved four or more number-one hits during the 2000s. A number of artists had number-one singles on their own as well as part of a collaboration. Madonna, Timbaland and Justin Timberlake's song "4 Minutes", for example, is counted for all three artists because they were credited on the cover, while "Where Is the Love?" does not count for Timberlake as he did not receive artist credit on that track in order to avoid overexposure.

Artist	Number-one hits
Westlife	11
Eminem	7
McFly	7
Sugababes	6
Madonna	5
The Black Eyed Peas	4
Beyoncé	4
Busted	4
Gareth Gates	4
Girls Aloud	4
Jay-Z	4
Nelly	4
Oasis	4
Elvis Presley	4
Britney Spears	4
U2	4
Robbie Williams	4
Will Young	4

=== Artists by total number of weeks at number one ===
Artist	Weeks at number-one
Jay-Z	15^{[A]}
Westlife	14^{[B]}
Rihanna	13
Leona Lewis	13
Peter Kay	12^{[F]}
Will Young	12^{[E]}
Sugababes	11^{[E]}
The Black Eyed Peas	11
Dizzee Rascal	11^{[E]}
Gareth Gates	11
Robbie Williams	10
Madonna	10
Atomic Kitten	9
Gnarls Barkley	9
Beyoncé	8
Girls Aloud	8
Shakira	8
McFly	8
Alexandra Burke	7^{[G]}
Lady Gaga	7
Eminem	7

=== Songs by total number of weeks at number one ===
Song	Weeks at number-one
"Umbrella"	10
"Crazy"	9
"Bleeding Love"	7
"Is This the Way to Amarillo"	7
"Where Is the Love?"	6
"Call on Me"	5
"Grace Kelly"	5
"Hips Don't Lie"	5
"I Kissed a Girl"	5
"Mercy"	5
"Now You're Gone"	5
"You're Beautiful"	5

- A. Total includes appearances on Rihanna's "Umbrella" and Beyoncé's "Crazy in Love" and "Déjà Vu".
- B. Total does not include two weeks spent at number one at the end of 1999 with "I Have a Dream" / "Seasons in the Sun".
- D. Total includes collaboration with Dizzee Rascal.
- E. Total includes Band Aid 20.
- F. Total includes credit as Brian Potter.

=== By record label ===
The following record labels had five or more number ones on the UK singles chart during the 2000s.

Record label	Number ones
Syco/S	23
Interscope	19
Polydor	18
Island	16
RCA	14
Universal	13
Columbia	12
Epic	9
Jive	9
Innocent	7
Mercury	7
Virgin	7
Def Jam	6
Parlophone	6
Positiva	6
Atlantic	5

== Million-selling and Platinum records ==
In April 1973, the British Phonographic Industry (BPI) began classifying singles and albums by the number of units shipped. The highest threshold is "Platinum" which, since 1989, is awarded to singles with over 600,000 units. (Note: The number of sales required to qualify for Platinum, Gold and Silver discs was dropped in 1989 from the former thresholds of Silver (250,000 units), Gold (500,000 units), and Platinum (1,000,000 units) to the current thresholds of Silver (200,000 units), Gold (400,000 units), and Platinum (600,000 units))

In July 2013, the BPI started a process of automatic certification regardless of original release dates, and since July 2014 audio streaming is included in the calculation of units at 100 streams equivalent to 1 sale or shipment. Hence, many of the singles released in the 2000s have been awarded certification in the 2010s.

For singles selling 1 million copies during the 2000s see List of best-selling singles of the 2000s (decade) in the United Kingdom

For a full list of singles which were released during the 2000s and have sold 1 million copies see List of million-selling singles in the United Kingdom and sort the table by release date

For Platinum singles released during the 2000s see List of Platinum singles in the United Kingdom awarded since 2000
