= You're No Good for Me =

Single by Kelly Charles
- Released: 1987
- Recorded: Alpha Recording, Teaneck
- Genre: House, garage house
- Length: 3:55
- Label: Next Plateau
- Songwriter(s): James Bratton, Kelly Charles
- Producer(s): James Bratton, Delores Drewry, Joe Maggio (exec.)

"You're No Good for Me" is a house song by American singer Kelly Charles that was released as a single on Next Plateau Records in 1987. The song's hook "You're no good for me, I don't need nobody / Don't need no one that's no good for me" has been sampled numerous times by artists such as Ally Brooke, Hithouse, Oxide & Neutrino, Plan B and the Prodigy who had a hit single in 1994 with "No Good (Start the Dance)".

== Background ==
The song was written by James Bratton and Kelly Charles and was produced by Bratton and Delores Drewry at Alpha Recording in Teaneck, New Jersey. It was released as a single in 1987 on Next Plateau Records in the United States and on London Records in the United Kingdom.

== Track listings ==
12-inch single

1. "You're No Good for Me" (radio version) – 3:55
2. "You're No Good for Me" (club mix) – 5:00
3. "You're No Good for Me" (Classy club dub mix) – 6:00

7-inch single

1. "You're No Good for Me" (instrumental) – 3:45
2. "You're No Good for Me" (radio version) – 3:55

== Personnel ==
- Kelly Charles – vocals
- James Bratton – producer, mixing
- Delores Drewry – producer
- Russ Kip Moore – engineer
- Keith Dumpson – mixing
- Joe Maggio – executive producer
- Greg Hatten – piano

== Samples, remixes and cover versions ==
Dutch DJ and producer Hithouse's single "Jack to the Sound of the Underground" was the first dance record to sample "You're No Good for Me" in 1988. The song peaked at number 14 on the UK Singles Chart.

British electronic group the Prodigy sampled the song for their 1994 hit single "No Good (Start the Dance)".

In 2000, UK garage duo Oxide & Neutrino interpolated "You're No Good for Me" on their second single "No Good 4 Me", which was taken from their debut album Execute (2001). The song features vocals from fellow So Solid Crew members Megaman, Romeo and Lisa Maffia and also contains elements from "No Good (Start the Dance)" by the Prodigy. The single peaked at No. 6 on the UK Singles Chart and was also certified silver by the BPI for sales of over 200,000 units.

In 2005, Plan B also interpolated the song in the chorus of "No Good", the first single taken from his debut album Who Needs Actions When You Got Words (2006). The track was produced by Paul Epworth and also samples "Psychedelic Shack" by the Temptations. The song was first released as a double A-side with "Sick 2 Def" in 2005 and was re-released in slightly remixed form by Jeremy Wheatley as a stand-alone single in 2007 with additional remixes including a remix by Chase & Status.

German rapper Kollegah also sampled "You're No Good for Me" and "No Good (Start the Dance)" in his song "Hater" (2007). Ultrabeat interpolated the song into "The Stalker" from their second album The Weekend Has Landed (2009). Lostprophets have incorporated the song into their cover of the Prodigy's "Omen" during their live shows.

List of songs that sample "You're No Good for Me"

- Hithouse - "Jack to the Sound of the Underground" (1988)
- Zener - "Listen" (1991)
- The Prodigy - "No Good (Start the Dance)" (1994)
- Search & Destroy - "Don't Need Nobody" (1994)
- Buzz Fuzz - "No Good 4 Me" (1997)
- Oxide & Neutrino - "No Good 4 Me" (2000)
- Norman Bass - "Jack to the Sound" (2002)
- DJ Fixx - "No Good 4 Me" (2003)
- Tocadisco - "You're No Good for Me" (2005)
- Plan B - "No Good" (2005)
- Bong-Ra - "Suicide Speed Machine Girl" (2006)
- D'Explicit - "Good for Me" (2007)
- Kollegah - "Hater" (2007)
- Gareth Wyn - "You're No Good for Me" (2009)
- Gidropony - "No Good" (2009)
- Ultrabeat - "The Stalker" (2009)
- Super Beez - "You're No Good for Me" (2010)
- Sean Finn - "No Good" (2011)
- Hixxy & Technikore feat. Intraspekt - "Don't Need" (2011)
- Fedde le Grand & Sultan & Ned Shepard - "No Good" (2013)
- The Shapeshifters - "No Need No Body" (2013)
- Samuele Sartini - "You're No Good for Me" (2014)
- Røse - "No Good" (2015)
- Dropgun - "Nobody" (2016)
- Zonderling and Don Diablo - "No Good" (2018)
- Ally Brooke - "No Good" (2019)
