= Up Middle Finger =

Single by Oxide & Neutrino

from the album Execute
- B-side: "Back 2 da Floor"
- Released: 14 May 2001
- Recorded: 2000
- Genre: Grime; garage
- Length: 5:29
- Label: EastWest
- Songwriters: Oxide & Neutrino
- Producer: DJ Oxide

Oxide & Neutrino singles chronology
"No Good 4 Me" (2000)	"Up Middle Finger" (2001)	"Remy on da Floor" (2001)

"Up Middle Finger" is a song by UK garage duo Oxide & Neutrino, released as the third single from their debut album Execute. It reached the top 10 on the UK Singles Chart, peaking at number 7. It was the duo's third consecutive top 10 hit, and the third of six non-consecutive top 20 hit singles. The song also reached number one on the UK Dance Singles Chart in May 2001.

"Up Middle Finger" contains an excerpt of a live performance of their 2000 number one hit "Bound 4 da Reload", recorded at Radio One Big Sunday Scotland.

== Track listing ==
UK 12" single
A. "Up Middle Finger" – 5:29
B. "Back 2 da Floor" – 4:58

UK CD single

1. "Up Middle Finger" (Radio Edit) – 3:35
2. "Back 2 da Floor" – 4:58
3. "Push Me 2 Hard" – 4:34
4. Video

== Charts ==
=== Weekly charts ===
Chart (2001)	Peak position
Europe (Eurochart Hot 100)	36
Scotland Singles (OCC)	48
UK Singles (OCC)	7
UK Dance (OCC)	1

=== Year-end charts ===
Chart (2001)	Position
UK Singles (OCC)	199
