= Come Here =

Come Here may refer to:

- Come Here (Cass Fox album)
- Come Here (KAT-TUN album)
- "Come Here", song by Masta Wu
- "Come Here", song by Dominic Fike off his 2020 album What Could Possibly Go Wrong

== See also ==
- C'mere, song by Interpol
