= 2nd Chance (Oxide & Neutrino album) =

Studio album by Oxide & Neutrino
- Released: 11 June 2007
- Recorded: 2003–2005
- Genre: UK garage, hip hop, grime
- Length: 63:19
- Label: Kemistree and Fizzicks

Oxide & Neutrino chronology
| 2 Stepz Ahead (2002) | 2nd Chance (2007) | Quarks & Leptons (EP) (2013) |

Singles from 2nd Chance
- 1. "What R U" Released: 14 May 2007

2nd Chance is the third album by Oxide & Neutrino, released on 11 June 2007. The album was delayed and tied up for a while after their label Sanctuary Records imploded and was absorbed by Universal Music Group. The album was self-released on their newly formed label Kemistree and Fizzicks.

== Track listing ==
1. "2nd Chance"
2. "What Are You"
3. "Brick in the Wall"
4. "Here We Go"
5. "Welcome to London"
6. "String Skip"
7. "Maze of Thoughts"
8. "Best Days"
9. "Turn It Up"
10. "Horn Hunter"
11. "Indorphins"
12. "Walk in the Dark Side"
13. "Crying"
14. "3 Short Stories"
15. "Special & Beautiful"
