= Quarks & Leptons =

EP by Oxide & Neutrino
- Released: 15 December 2013
- Genre: UK garage, hip hop, grime
- Length: 24:46
- Label: Trapp Music Group

Oxide & Neutrino chronology
| 2nd Chance (2007) | Quarks & Leptons (2013) |

Professional ratings
Review scores
| Source | Rating |
|---|---|
| AH 25/8 Entertainment | 8/10 |

Quarks & Leptons is the first EP by Oxide & Neutrino, released on 15 December 2013. It is the follow-up to their third album, 2nd Chance, released in 2007.

== Track listing ==
1. "Marimba" (Main Vocal Mix)
2. "Kill Em' wid da Sound" (featuring Amy Steele)
3. "In the Morning" (featuring Zahra Palmer)
4. "Crazy Life" (featuring Cash James)
5. "Horrible Animals"
