= 2 Stepz Ahead =

Studio album by Oxide & Neutrino
- Released: 30 September 2002
- Recorded: 2001–2002
- Genre: UK garage, hip hop
- Label: Warner Music UK

Oxide & Neutrino chronology
Execute (2001)	2 Stepz Ahead (2002)	2nd Chance (2007)

Singles from 2 Stepz Ahead
- 1. "Rap Dis (U Can't Stop Dis Shit)" Released: 26 November 2001; 2. "Dem Girlz (I Don't Know Why)" Released: 16 September 2002

Professional ratings
Review scores
Source	Rating
BBC Suffolk	8/10
entertainment.ie	3/5 stars
The Guardian	3/5 stars
NME	7/10

2 Stepz Ahead is the second album by Oxide & Neutrino, released on 30 September 2002. The album features two top 20 singles and peaked at #28 on the UK albums chart. The song "Shoot 2 Kill" was prominently featured in the film Ali G Indahouse and also appeared on the soundtrack.

== Track listing ==
1. "Intro"
2. "Return of Da Supa" (featuring Face)
3. "Dem Girlz (I Don't Know Why)" (featuring Kowdean)
4. "Rap Dis (U Can't Stop Dis Shit)" (featuring Swiss, Skat D, Kaish and Harvey)
5. "Hands Up"
6. "Supa Sensi" (featuring Sniper)
7. "They Think It's Easy" (featuring Sef)
8. "War"
9. "Amsterdam"
10. "Sir Pimpalot (featuring Skat D)
11. "Shoot 2 Kill"
12. "Rap Dis 2 (featuring Kaish, Swiss and Thug Angel)
13. "Hard 2 Get" (featuring The Twins)
14. "Garage Beat"
15. "Party On" (featuring AC Burrell)
16. "Roadz Crazy"
17. "Payback"
18. "J99"

== Chart positions ==
=== Album ===
Year	Chart	Peak	Ref.
2002	UK Album Chart	28	

=== Singles ===
Year	Chart	Single	Peak	Ref.
2001	UK Singles Chart	"Rap Dis (U Can't Stop Dis Shit)"	12	
2002	UK Singles Chart	"Dem Girlz (I Don't Know Why)"	10	

=== Certifications ===
Country	Provider	Certification
United Kingdom	BPI	Silver
