= No Good 4 Me =

2000 single by Oxide & Neutrino

Single by Oxide & Neutrino featuring Megaman, Romeo & Lisa Maffia

from the album Execute
- B-side: "Foot to the Floor"
- Released: 18 December 2000
- Genre: UK garage
- Length: 6:01
- Label: EastWest
- Songwriter(s): James Bratton, Liam Howlett, Megaman, Neutrino, Romeo
- Producer(s): DJ Oxide

Oxide & Neutrino singles chronology
"Bound 4 da Reload (Casualty)" (2000)	"No Good 4 Me" (2000)	"Up Middle Finger" (2001)

"No Good 4 Me" is a song by UK garage duo Oxide & Neutrino, released as the second single from the debut album Execute. The song features other members of the So Solid Crew; Megaman, Romeo and Lisa Maffia. It reached the top 10 on the UK Singles Chart, peaking at number 6. It was the second of six non-consecutive top 20 hit singles for the duo.

"No Good 4 Me" interpolates the Prodigy's "No Good (Start the Dance)", which itself samples Kelly Charles' "You're No Good for Me", in which the chorus of this song is sung by Lisa Maffia in "No Good 4 Me".

== Critical reception ==
NME described “No Good 4 Me” as taking “the vocal of Liam Howlett’s helium rave epic ‘No Good (Start The Dance)’ back into the Top Ten,” underlining how the single’s re-contextualised hook drove its mainstream impact. The Guardian cast the track as a purposely tougher, Prodigy-leaning outlier within garage, calling it a “rough-edged groove” and suggesting its crossover appeal would likely deliver a Top-10 result.

== Track listing ==
UK 12" single
A1. "No Good 4 Me" (Radio Edit) – 3:15
A2. "No Good 4 Me" – 6:01
B. "Foot to the Floor" – 4:52

== Charts ==
=== Weekly charts ===
Chart (2000)	Peak position
UK Singles (OCC)	6

=== Year-end charts ===
Chart (2000)	Position
UK Singles (OCC)	162

Chart (2001)	Position
UK Singles (OCC)	195
