= The Solid Sound of the Underground =

Compilation album by Oxide & Neutrino and various artists
- Released: 1 May 2000
- Recorded: 1999–2000
- Genre: UK garage, hip hop, grime
- Length: 63:13
- Label: East West

Oxide & Neutrino chronology
The Solid Sound of the Underground (2000)	Execute (2001)

Oxide & Neutrino Present: The Solid Sound of the Underground is a 2000 compilation album containing songs of the So Solid Crew and various other artists of the UK garage scene.

== Track listing ==
1. "Bound 4 da Reload" (remix) - Oxide & Neutrino
2. "Dangerous" - Same People
3. "I Don't Smoke" (Nu Skool Rave mix) - DJ Dee Kline
4. "Oh No (Sentimental Things)" - So Solid Crew
5. "Bring the Lights Down" - Mr. Reds & Kaliber
6. "Rumble" - Kaos & the One Eyed Wonder
7. "Life Is What You Make It" - Sidewinder
8. "Neighbourhood" (Zed Bias vocal mix) - Zed Bias
9. "Can You Feel It" - Mr. Reds
10. "Buddah Finger" - Reservoir Dogs
11. "Dilemma" - So Solid Crew
12. "You're Mine" - Suburban Lick
13. "Basslick" - Second Protocol
14. "Terminator" - Oxide & Neutrino
15. "Why" - So Solid Crew
16. "Poison" - The Corrupted Cru
17. "Bound 4 da Reload (Casualty)" - Oxide & Neutrino
18. "How Much Gal" - The Corrupted Cru
19. "Supergran" - DJ Oxide/DJ Big Kid
