= Execute (album) =

Studio album by Oxide & Neutrino
- Released: 28 May 2001
- Recorded: June 1999 – March 2001
- Genre: 2-step garage; hip hop
- Length: 76:12
- Label: East West, Warner Music UK

Oxide & Neutrino chronology
The Solid Sound of the Underground (2000)	Execute (2001)	2 Stepz Ahead (2002)

Singles from Execute
- 1. "Bound 4 da Reload (Casualty)" Released: 24 April 2000; 2. "No Good 4 Me" Released: 18 December 2000; 3. "Up Middle Finger" Released: 14 May 2001; 4. "Devil's Nightmare" Released: 16 July 2001; 5. "Only Wanna Know Cos Ure Famous" Released: 26 November 2001

Professional ratings
Review scores
Source	Rating
AllMusic	2.5/5 stars
NME	8/10

Execute is the debut album of So Solid Crew members Oxide & Neutrino, released on 28 May 2001. It features the Casualty sampling number 1 single "Bound 4 da Reload (Casualty)" and the Prodigy cover "No Good 4 Me". The song "Devil's Nightmare" was also featured on the Lara Croft: Tomb Raider soundtrack.

== Track listing ==
1. "Execute"
2. "No Good 4 Me" (featuring Megaman, Romeo and Lisa Maffia)
3. "Up Middle Finger"
4. "Foot 2 da Floor"
5. "Don't Give a Damn" (featuring Harvey)
6. "Setting da Pace"
7. "Bound 4 da Reload (Casualty)"
8. "Fighting Machine" (featuring Kaish)
9. "Remy on da Floor" (featuring Megaman)
10. "Devil's Nightmare"
11. "Back 2 da Floor"
12. "Nuff of Dem Watch Me"
13. "N Digga Dee"
14. "Only Wanna Know U Cos Ure Famous"
15. "Check Dis" (featuring Asher D)

== Critical reception ==
Q magazine included Execute on their 50 best albums of 2001 list.

"Up Middle Finger" won Best Video at the 2001 MOBO Awards.

== Chart positions ==
=== Weekly charts ===
Chart (2001)	Peak position
Scottish Albums (OCC)	77
UK Albums (OCC)	11

=== Year-end charts ===
Chart (2001)	Position
UK Albums (OCC)	88

=== Singles ===
Year	Chart	Single	Peak	Ref.	Cert.
2000	UK Singles Chart	"Bound 4 da Reload (Casualty)"	1		UK: Silver
2000	UK Singles Chart	"No Good 4 Me"	6		UK: Silver
2001	UK Singles Chart	"Up Middle Finger"	7		
2001	UK Singles Chart	"Devil's Nightmare"	16		
2001	UK Singles Chart	"Only Wanna Know Cos Ure Famous" (double A-side with "Rap Dis")	12		

=== Certifications ===
Country	Provider	Certification
United Kingdom	BPI	Gold
