= Cass Fox =

British musician

Cassandra Fox
- Born: Cassandra Fox; 24 December 1982 (age 43)
- Origin: London, England
- Genres: Pop, dance, soul, electronic
- Occupations: Singer, songwriter
- Instrument: Producer
- Years active: 2000–2001; 2005–present
- Label: Ministry of Sound/ Island Records (2005)

Cassandra "Cass" Fox (born 24 December 1982) is a British singer and songwriter from London. She is best known for writing and singing on the 2001 UK Singles Chart-topping hit "Touch Me", which she co-produced with Rui da Silva.

== Biography ==
Cassandra Ann Fox was born in London in 1982 as the only daughter in a large working-class Irish family. She never had any formal training or stage school to guide her, but knew from an early age she wanted to make music.

Fox was spotted by a friend of Portuguese producer Rui Da Silva as she returned from a night out, singing with a reggae band, busking for an "impromptu" jam on the streets of the West End. Numbers were exchanged and she went down to the Roundhouse studios, where she became a permanent fixture at the studio, working and hanging out with the other producers who also worked there. It was while at Roundhouse studies that Fox wrote the lyrics for the now legendary "Touch Me", as well as laying down the vocals and helping co-produce the track with Rui. "Touch Me" topped the Portuguese Singles Chart. Outside Portugal, "Touch Me" also topped the charts in Ireland and Fox's native United Kingdom. In the latter country, "Touch Me" became the first single to top the UK Singles Chart in the 21st century and third millennium and went on to sell over 600,000 copies. In addition, at 18 years and 14 days, Fox became the then third-youngest female artist to top the UK Singles Chart with their debut single after Billie Piper and Britney Spears, who were 15 years 9 months and 5 days and 17 years 2 months and 19 days respectively when they topped the chart with "Because We Want To" and "...Baby One More Time" in June 1998 and February 1999.

Cass was the first of two support acts on Faithless' Forever Faithless tour in 2005. Cass later appeared on the 2006 Faithless album To All New Arrivals, providing vocals for the track "Music Matters". The single peaked at number 38 on the UK Singles Chart. She has appeared alongside the band on the tour supporting this album in 2007 with support act Calvin Harris.

She has been signed to Ministry of Sound and Island/Universal Records for her album Come Here. Has worked with Rollo, Faithless, Rick Knowles, Ben Langmaid (La Roux) and has performed at Coachella, Wembley, Filmore (San Francisco), Webster Hall (New York City). She has appeared on Top of the Pops twice, CD:UK, Smash Hits TV performing her hit "Touch Me" and The Album Chart Show with Faithless singing "Music Matters". As well as supporting and singing alongside the likes of Lauryn Hill, Keane, and Paolo Nutini.

A version of her song "Little Bird" was remixed into DJ Tiësto's compilation album In Search of Sunrise 5: Los Angeles, released in 2006. She has also worked with Paul Oakenfold on a cover and new vocal of her hit record "Touch Me", which was released in 2014.

== Discography ==
=== Albums ===
- Come Here
  Original release (19 September 2005)
- Come Here
  Re-release (19 June 2006)

=== Singles ===
- "Touch Me" with Rui Da Silva (1 January 2001)
- "Out of My Reach" (5 September 2005)
- "Army of One" (12 June 2006)
- "Little Bird" (12 June 2006)
- "Touch Me" – new version (30 October 2006)

=== Demo sampler releases ===
Release
Come Here (5 Track UK Promo CD)
Come Here (4 Track UK Promo CD)
Track Listing

No.	Title	Length
1.	"Out of My Reach"	3:26
2.	"Million Dollars"	4:00
3.	"Strangers"	4:29
4.	"Little Bird"	5:46
5.	"Come Here"	3:31

No.	Title	Length
1.	"Out of My Reach"	3:26
2.	"Million Dollars"	4:00
3.	"Strangers"	4:29
4.	"Save Me"	4:14

Year of Release
2005
2005
