= Touch Me (Rui da Silva song) =

2001 single by Rui da Silva featuring Cass Fox

Single by Rui da Silva featuring Cassandra
- Released: 1 January 2001
- Genre: Progressive house
- Length: 8:36 (original mix); 3:40 (radio edit)
- Label: Kismet; Arista; BMG
- Composer: Rui da Silva
- Lyricist: Cassandra Fox
- Producer: Rui da Silva

Rui da Silva singles chronology
"Touch Me" (2001)	"Feel the Love" (2002)

Cass Fox singles chronology
"Touch Me" (2001)	"Out of My Reach" (2005)

Lyric video
- "Rui Da Silva Feat Cassandra - Touch Me (Lyric Video Official)" on YouTube

"Touch Me" is a song by Portuguese house music producer Rui da Silva and British singer-songwriter Cassandra Fox. The song began to gain popularity after being played in dance clubs in October 2000. The track was originally scheduled for release in December 2000, but it was postponed to avoid competing with songs that would experience sales surges resulting from the Christmas holiday period. It was eventually released on 1 January 2001.

The single spent one week at number one on the UK Singles Chart and sold over 600,000 copies, earning a platinum certification from the British Phonographic Industry (BPI). It was the first progressive house song to reach number one in the UK as well as the first song by a Portuguese act to top the chart. The song also reached number one in Ireland and Silva's native Portugal while peaking inside the top 10 in Flanders, Greece, and Spain. In the United States, it reached number seven on the Billboard Dance Club Play chart. "Touch Me" earned Rui an award for Best Single in the Muzik magazine Dance Awards 2001.

== Background and release ==
Vocalist Cassandra Fox wrote the lyrics for "Touch Me" while Rui da Silva composed the music and produced the track. Da Silva told Billboard that the song originally contained a guitar part which was inspired by Spandau Ballet's "Chant No. 1". This part was removed after difficulties getting clearance on the publishing. The removal partially resulted in the record's release being delayed from Christmas 2000 until the beginning of 2001. Another reason the track's release was delayed was to avoid the spike in song sales that would occur during the days leading up to Christmas; it would eventually be issued on 1 January 2001.

== Critical reception ==
Bob Stanley of The Guardian reflected that, although the first UK number one of 2001, the song was what he imagined as a child the first number one of the 2000s would sound like, saying he "knew it would be electronic, and may involve a certain amount of silver lurex." He further commented of the song: "The sound of the future had arrived in that most cosmic of years, exactly as it might have been imagined by Stanley Kubrick: spacy, disembodied, oddly beautiful." He also commented that he did not remember the song from when it was a hit, a point reinforced by Dom Passantio of Stylus Magazine, who called it "easily the most forgotten number one of the decade." In 2020, The Guardian ranked the song at number 70 on their list of "The 100 Greatest UK No 1 Singles", with writer Ben Beaumont-Thomas praising the instrumentation and Fox's vocals.

== Track listings ==
European CD single

1. "Touch Me" (radio edit)
2. "Touch Me" (original 12-inch)
3. "Touch Me" (Double 99 12-inch club mix)

European maxi-CD single

1. "Touch Me" (radio edit) – 3:28
2. "Touch Me" (original 12-inch) – 8:32
3. "Touch Me" (Double 99 12-inch club mix) – 7:40
4. "Touch Me" (Peace Division's Higher Dub) – 7:03

European 12-inch single

A1. "Touch Me" (original 12-inch)
A2. "Touch Me" (radio edit)
AA1. "Touch Me" (Double 99 12-inch club mix)
AA2. "Touch Me" (Peace Division's Higher Dub Remix)

French CD single

1. "Touch Me" (radio edit)
2. "Touch Me" (original 12-inch)

UK 12-inch single

A. "Touch Me" (original 12-inch)
B. "Touch Me" (radio edit)

Australian and New Zealand CD single

1. "Touch Me" (radio edit)
2. "Touch Me" (original 12-inch)
3. "Touch Me" (Double 99 12-inch club mix)
4. "Touch Me" (Peace Division Higher Remix)
5. "Touch Me" (Saffron Mix)
6. "Touch Me" (video)

== Charts ==
=== Weekly charts ===
Chart (2001)	Peak position
Australia (ARIA)	29
Australian Club Chart (ARIA)	1
Australian Dance (ARIA)	4
Belgium (Ultratop 50 Flanders)	6
Belgium (Ultratop 50 Wallonia)	11
Belgium Dance (Ultratop Flanders)	1
Europe (Eurochart Hot 100)	7
Finland (Suomen virallinen lista)	12
France (SNEP)	74
Germany (GfK)	56
Greece (IFPI)	4
Ireland (IRMA)	1
Ireland Dance (IRMA)	1
Italy (FIMI)	17
Netherlands (Dutch Top 40)	20
Netherlands (Single Top 100)	28
Portugal (AFP)	1
Romania (Romanian Top 100)	19
Scottish Singles Sales (Official Charts)	1
Spain (Promusicae)	6
Sweden (Sverigetopplistan)	58
Switzerland (Schweizer Hitparade)	85
UK Singles (Official Charts)	1
UK Dance (Official Charts)	3
UK Indie (Official Charts)	4
US Dance Club Play (Billboard)	7

=== Year-end charts ===
Chart (2001)	Position
Australian Club Chart (ARIA)	11
Belgium (Ultratop 50 Flanders)	34
Belgium (Ultratop 50 Wallonia)	42
Europe (Eurochart Hot 100)	79
Ireland (IRMA)	33
Romania (Romanian Top 100)	97
UK Singles (OCC)	25

== Certifications ==
Region	Certification	Certified units/sales
United Kingdom (BPI)	Platinum	600,000^{‡}
^{‡} Sales+streaming figures based on certification alone.

== Release history ==
Region	Date	Format(s)	Label(s)	Ref.
United Kingdom	1 January 2001	12-inch vinyl; CD; cassette	Kismet	
Australia	19 March 2001	CD	Kismet; Bang On!	
New Zealand	2 April 2001	12-inch remix vinyl; CD	Kismet; Bang On!	

== Cassandra Fox version ==
"Touch Me"

Single by Cass Fox

from the album Come Here
- B-side: "Touch Me" (X-Press 2's Rave and Bleep vocal)
- Released: 30 October 2006
- Length: 4:01
- Label: Island
- Songwriters: Cassandra Fox; Rui da Silva; Gary Kemp
- Producer: Rollo Armstrong

Cass Fox singles chronology
"Little Bird" (2006)	"Touch Me" (2006)

Island Records released their own version in 2006, re-recording it with the backing track for Cass Fox's album Come Here. Information of the re-release was posted on her personal website: "4 years after the track was originally number one, the track written and sung by Cass with Rui da Silva is being re-released on 30 October. Remixes come from X-Press 2, Tom Neville and Spencer & Hill and have already been getting plays on Radio 1 (Judge Jules) and Kiss FM."

Fox left Island Records and decided not to move forward with the re-release of "Touch Me". She went on the Faithless Tour instead.

=== Track listings ===
UK CD single

1. "Touch Me" (Spencer & Hill Mix)
2. "Touch Me" (X-Press 2's Rave and Bleep vocal)
3. "Touch Me" (Spencer & Hill Full Length Mix)
4. "Touch Me" (radio edit)

UK 12-inch vinyl

A. "Touch Me" (Spencer & Hill Full Length Mix)
B. "Touch Me" (X-Press 2's Rave and Bleep vocal)

Digital download

1. "Touch Me" (Spencer & Hill radio edit) – 3:27

== Melanie C version ==
On 3 September 2021, English pop music singer Melanie C released her cover of "Touch Me" to accompany the deluxe digital and streaming version of her eighth studio album, Melanie C. The single was produced by Billen Ted. The official music video was released to YouTube on the same day.
