= Come Here (Cass Fox album) =

- Cover for Original 2005 Release

Studio album by Cass Fox
- Released: Original Release - 19 September 2005 (UK); Re-Release - 19 June 2006 (UK)
- Recorded: Various
- Genres: Pop, dance
- Length: 50:06
- Label: Island
- Producer: Rollo Armstrong

Alternative Cover
- Cover for re-release in 2006.

Come Here is Cass Fox's first full-length album release as a solo artist. Commenting on her own album she said:

"I want this album to touch people, That’s the most important thing to me; that it connects to people and perhaps tells them that whatever it is they want to do, they can do it. If I can, anyone can. I want it to be like a comfort blanket, something they can put around them to stay sane."

== Track listing ==
=== Original (2005) ===
1. Out of My Reach Cassandra Fox - Ruth Copeland - Clyde Darnell Wilson - P*Nut (a.k.a. John Harrison) - 3:26
2. Million Dollars Cassandra Fox - Roland Armstrong - 4:00
3. Save Me Cassandra Fox - Craig Stephen Dodds - 4:14
4. Daddy Dear Cassandra Fox - Roland Armstrong - Peter Rinaldi - Matt Benbrook - Simon Gough - 3:46
5. Come Here Cassandra Fox - Craig Stephen Dodds - Guy Farley - 3:31
6. Strangers Cassandra Fox - Craig Stephen Dodds - 4:29
7. Live A Little Cassandra Fox - Roland Armstrong - P*Nut (a.k.a. John Harrison) - 3:14
8. Army Of One Cassandra Fox - Steve McCarthy - 3:36
9. God Likes Good Lovers Cassandra Fox - Roland Armstrong - Mark Bates - 3:58
10. Little Bird Cassandra Fox - Ben Langmaid - Jeffrey Michael Patterson - Mark Bates - 5:46
11. Into The Blue Cassandra Fox - Matt Benbrook - 4:52
12. Touch Me (Acoustic) Cassandra Fox - Rui Da Silva - 4:01

=== Re-package + New Versions (2006) ===
1. Out Of My Reach - 3:26
2. Million Dollars - 4:00
3. Save Me - 4:14
4. Daddy Dear - 3:46
5. Come Here - 3:31
6. Strangers (New Version) - 4:42
7. Live A Little - 3:14
8. Army Of One (New Version) - 4:13
9. God Likes Good Lovers - 3:58
10. Little Bird - 5:46
11. Touch Me (New Version) - 4:22
12. Into The Blue - 4:54

^{*} This was re-released on 6 November 2006 with the bonus track Touch Me (Spencer & Hill Radio Edit)
