= Bound 4 da Reload (Casualty) =

2000 single by Oxide & Neutrino

Single by Oxide & Neutrino

from the album The Solid Sound of the Underground and Execute
- B-side: "Express da Funk"
- Released: 24 April 2000
- Genre: 2-step garage
- Length: 5:23
- Label: EastWest
- Composer: Ken Freeman
- Lyricists: Oxide & Neutrino
- Producers: Oxide & Neutrino

Oxide & Neutrino singles chronology
"Bound 4 da Reload (Casualty)" (2000)	"No Good 4 Me" (2000)

"Bound 4 da Reload (Casualty)" is a song by British duo Oxide & Neutrino, members of the So Solid Crew. The track features a sample from the theme tune to the BBC medical drama Casualty, composed by Ken Freeman. The duo had not initially gone the correct route to clear the rights to use the Casualty theme, instead calling a BBC receptionist to tell them they were sampling it. When they signed with EastWest Records, the company cleared the sample. The song was first released in 1999 on white label, simply titled "Casualty".

Released on 24 April 2000 as the duo's debut single, "Bound 4 da Reload" peaked at number one on the UK Singles Chart on 30 April 2000. The double 12-inch release was not eligible for the singles chart due to its length, which broke chart regulations; it instead appeared on the UK Albums Chart, reaching number 71. While the record appeared on Top of the Pops during its week at number one, many radio stations refused to play "Bound 4 da Reload" because of its spoken sample from the film Lock, Stock and Two Smoking Barrels, spoken by the actors Tony McMahon and Frank Harper ("Ah! Shit! I've been shot!/I don't fucking believe this, could everyone stop getting shot?"). On the BBC Radio 1 Chart Show, a version was played with the swearing edited out.

== Track listings ==
UK CD1 and cassette single

1. "Bound 4 da Reload (Casualty)" (radio edit) – 3:51
2. "Express da Funk" – 5:33
3. "Bound 4 da Reload" – 5:23

UK CD2

1. "Bound 4 da Reload (Casualty)" – 4:51
2. "Bound 4 da Reload (Casualty)" (remix) – 6:21
3. "Bound 4 da Reload (Casualty)" (video)

UK 2×12-inch single

A. "Bound 4 da Reload (Casualty)" – 4:51
B. "Bound 4 da Reload" – 5:23
C. "Bound 4 da Reload (Casualty)" (remix) – 6:21
D. "Express da Funk" – 5:33

== Charts ==
=== Weekly charts ===
Chart (2000)	Peak position
Europe (Eurochart Hot 100)	9
Ireland (IRMA)	26
Scottish Singles Sales (Official Charts)	11
UK Singles (Official Charts)	1
UK Albums (Official Charts) 2×12-inch single	71

=== Year-end charts ===
Chart (2000)	Position
UK Singles (OCC)	51
