= Oxide & Neutrino =

English musical duo

- Origin: London, England
- Genres: UK garage
- Years active: 1999–2007, 2011–present
- Label: East West Records
- Spinoff of: So Solid Crew
- Members: Alex Rivers (Oxide); Mark Osei-tutu (Neutrino)
- Website: Oxideneutrino.co.uk

Oxide & Neutrino are an English DJ and MC garage duo from London, consisting of Alex Rivers (Oxide), and Mark Osei-tutu (Neutrino).

== Musical career ==
Their first single "Bound 4 da Reload (Casualty)" entered at the top of the UK Singles Chart in April 2000. It is known for sampling the theme music to the BBC medical drama series Casualty, ITV police drama The Bill and also contains samples of dialogue from the 1998 film Lock, Stock and Two Smoking Barrels.

Their track "Shoot to Kill" appears, played from car stereos, in the film Ali G Indahouse. It is also featured on the original soundtrack CD.

Oxide & Neutrino are members of UK garage group So Solid Crew. Oxide also produced tracks on Lisa Maffia's debut album, First Lady, and the track "Industry Lady" on Face's mixtape Sign 2 the Block.

The duo made a return to the music scene in 2007, first with new single "What R U" released on 14 May, and then with their fourth album 2nd Chance following on 11 June. An interview with Darker Romello of Mayhem TV entitled "The Return of Oxide & Neutrino" appeared on Grimedaily, announcing new material set to be released in the summer of 2011.

In 2013, the duo appeared alongside many other garage pioneers in a documentary exploring the legacy of UK garage, Rewind 4Ever: The History of UK Garage.

The duo signed a new record deal in January 2021 with New State Music and released the track "Where Do We Go" featuring Leo the Lion.

== Discography ==
=== Studio albums ===
Title	Album details	Peak chart positions			Certifications
Title	Album details	UK	EUR	SCO	Certifications
Execute	Released: 28 May 2001; Label: East West (#8573885592); Formats: CD	11	50	77	UK: Gold
2 Stepz Ahead	Released: 30 September 2002; Label: East West (#5046607562); Formats: CD	28	89	—	UK: Silver
2nd Chance	Released: 11 June 2007; Label: Kemistree and Fizzicks; Formats: CD	—	—	—	
"—" denotes items that did not chart or were not released in that territory.

=== Multi-artist compilation albums ===
Title	Album details	Peak chart positions
Title	Album details	UK Compilation
The Solid Sound of the Underground	Released: 1 May 2000; Label: East West (#8573829512); Formats: CD	21
"—" denotes items that did not chart or were not released in that territory.

=== EPs ===
Year	Title	Tracks
2013	Quarks & Leptons	"Marimba" (Main Vocal Mix); "Kill Em' wid da Sound" (featuring Amy Steele); "In the Morning" (featuring Zahra Palmer); "Crazy Life" (featuring Cash James); "Horrible Animals"

=== Singles ===
Year	Title	Peak chart positions							Certifications	Album
Year	Title	UK	UK Dance	UK R&B	EUR	IRE	NED	SCO	Certifications	Album
2000	"Bound 4 da Reload (Casualty)"	1	—	—	9	26	—	11	UK: Silver	Execute
2000	"No Good 4 Me" (featuring Megaman, Romeo & Lisa Maffia)	6	—	—	29	39	—	20	UK: Silver	Execute
2001	"Up Middle Finger"	7	1	—	36	—	—	48		Execute
2001	"Remy on da Floor"	96	16	—	—	—	—	—		Execute
2001	"Nuff of Dem Watch Me"	104	23	—	—	—	—	—		Execute
2001	"Only Wanna Know U Cos Ure Famous"	115	32	—	—	—	—	—		Execute
2001	"Devil's Nightmare"	16	—	—	70	—	—	34		Execute
2001	"Rap Dis"/"Only Wanna Know U Cos Ure Famous"	12	—	—	52	—	50	44		2 Stepz Ahead
2002	"Dem Girlz (I Don't Know Why)"	10	—	3	44	—	—	40		2 Stepz Ahead
2007	"What R U"	—	—	—	—	—	—	—		2nd Chance
2021	"Where Do We Go" (featuring Leo the Lion)	—	—	—	—	—	—	—		Non-album single
"—" denotes items that did not chart or were not released in that territory.
