= The Dance Years =

- Title sequence for first episode
- Genre: Documentary
- Created by: Glenn Sims
- Written by: Dave Pearce
- Presented by: Dave Pearce
- Country of origin: United Kingdom
- No. of series: 1
- No. of episodes: 14

Production
- Producer: Anna Kingsley / Paul Sampson
- Editor: Tim Rogg
- Running time: 60 minutes
- Production company: Hewland International

Original release
- Network: ITV
- Release: 21 April – 21 July 2001

The Dance Years is a British documentary series created by Glenn Sims and written and presented by radio DJ Dave Pearce. It premiered on 21 July 2001 on the British channel ITV. The 14-episode series focused on dance music in the UK between 1988 and 2001, with each episode charting Pearce's personal top 10 dance tracks for a particular year. The programme also explored the year's most influential people, songs and nightclubs. Each episode was broadcast on ITV on Saturday mornings at approximately 1 a.m. Dorian Lynskey of The Guardian described The Dance Years as being part of a "bumper year" for retrospectives of dance music.

Six different artists had a song featured on more than one episode. The British band The Prodigy were featured on three different episodes: on "1991" with "Charly", on "1992" with "Out of Space", and on "1996" with "Firestarter". In addition, the British DJ Norman Cook was featured twice as Fatboy Slim and once as a member of Beats International. The Dance Years featured talking head interviews with artists such as Double 99, Artful Dodger, Faithless, Slipmatt, Fabio, Judge Jules, Joey Negro, Sneaker Pimps, Boy George, Tony Wilson, Graeme Park, Roger Sanchez, Phats & Small and M&S. Following the TV series of The Dance Years, Pearce went on to release a set of compilation albums under the same name in 2009, and hosted a similarly titled radio series in 2012.

== Episodes ==
No.	Year	Written by	Original release date
1	"1988"	Dave Pearce	21 April 2001
Top 10 for 1988: 1. S'Express – "Theme from S'Express"; 2. Inner City – "Good Life"; 3. Raze – "Break 4 Love"; 4. Kym Mazelle – "Got to Get You Back"; 5. Mory Kante – "Ye Ke Ye Ke"; 6. D Mob – "We Call It Aciied!"; 7. Bomb the Bass – "Beat Dis"; 8. The Beatmasters – "Rok da House"; 9. M/A/R/R/S – "Pump Up the Volume"; 10. Rob Base & DJ E-Z Rock – "It Takes Two"
2	"1989"	Dave Pearce	28 April 2001
Top 10 for 1989: 1. Black Box – "Ride on Time"; 2. Lil' Louis – "French Kiss"; 3. A Guy Called Gerald – "Voodoo Ray"; 4. Soul II Soul – "Back to Life"; 5. Frankie Knuckles – "Tears"; 6. Adeva – "Respect"; 7. Ten City – "That's the Way Love Is"; 8. 808 State – "Pacific State"; 9. Sueno Latino – "Sueno Latino"; 10. Coldcut feat. Lisa Stansfield – "People Hold On"
3	"1990"	Dave Pearce	5 May 2001
Top 10 for 1990: 1. Adamski – "Killer"; 2. Snap – "The Power"; 3. Beats International – "Dub Be Good to Me"; 4. Deee-Lite – "Groove Is in the Heart"; 5. C+C Music Factory – "Gonna Make You Sweat (Everybody Dance Now)"; 6. KLF – "What Time Is Love?"; 7. Blue Pearl – "Naked in the Rain"; 8. LFO – "LFO"; 9. Nightmares on Wax – "Aftermath"; 10. Happy Mondays – "Step On"
4	"1991"	Dave Pearce	12 May 2001
Top 10 for 1991: 1. The Source – "You Got the Love"; 2. The Prodigy – "Charly"; 3. Nomad – "Devotion"; 4. Moby – "Go"; 5. Alison Limerick – "Where Love Lives"; 6. Crystal Waters – "Gypsy Woman (La Da Dee)"; 7. N-Joi – "Anthem"; 8. K-Klass – "Rhythm Is a Mystery"; 9. Xpansions – "Move Your Body (Elevation)"; 10. Rozalla – "Everybody's Free (To Feel Good)"
5	"1992"	Dave Pearce	19 May 2001
Top 10 for 1992: 1. Liquid – "Sweet Harmony"; 2. Ce Ce Peniston – "Finally"; 3. Clivilles & Cole – "A Deeper Love"; 4. Bizarre Inc – "I'm Gonna Get You"; 5. Felix – "Don't You Want Me"; 6. The Orb – "Little Fluffy Clouds"; 7. Future Sound of London – "Papua New Guinea"; 8. SL2 – "On a Ragga Tip"; 9. Urban Shakedown – "Some Justice"; 10. The Prodigy – "Out of Space"
6	"1993"	Dave Pearce	26 May 2001
Top 10 for 1993: 1. Robin S. – "Show Me Love"; 2. Leftfield – "Open Up"; 3. Urban Cookie Collective – "The Key: The Secret"; 4. USURA – "Open Your Mind"; 5. Juliet Roberts – "Caught in the Middle"; 6. Golden Girls – "Kinetic"; 7. Shades of Rhythm – "Sound of Eden"; 8. Underworld – "Rez"; 9. Slam – "Positive Education"; 10. Jaydee – "Plastic Dreams"
7	"1994"	Dave Pearce	2 June 2001
Top 10 for 1994: 1. Reel 2 Real – "I Like to Move It"; 2. JX – "Son of a Gun"; 3. O.T Quartet – "Hold That Sucker Down"; 4. Barbara Tucker – "Beautiful People"; 5. The Grid – "Swamp Thing"; 6. Atlantic Ocean – "Waterfall"; 7. Goldie – "Inner City Life"; 8. M-Beat feat. General Levy – "Incredible"; 9. Shy FX feat. UK Apache – "Original Nuttah"; 10. Baby D – "Let Me Be Your Fantasy"
8	"1995"	Dave Pearce	9 June 2001
Top 10 for 1995: 1. Livin' Joy – "Dreamer"; 2. Everything But the Girl – "Missing"; 3. Nightcrawlers – "Push the Feeling On"; 4. The Bucketheads – "The Bomb"; 5. Grace – "Not Over Yet"; 6. Josh Wink – "Higher State of Consciousness"; 7. De'Lacy – "Hideaway"; 8. Adam F – "Circles"; 9. Alex Reece – "Feel the Sunshine"; 10. Wildchild – "Renegade Master"
9	"1996"	Dave Pearce	16 June 2001
Top 10 for 1996: 1. Underworld – "Born Slippy"; 2. The Prodigy – "Firestarter"; 3. Tori Amos – "Professional Widow"; 4. Todd Terry – "Keep On Jumpin'"; 5. Hysteric Ego – "Want Love"; 6. Farley & Heller Project – "Ultra Flava"; 7. Gusto – "Disco's Revenge"; 8. BBE – "Seven Days and One Week"; 9. Chicane – "Offshore"; 10. Faithless – "Insomnia"
10	"1997"	Dave Pearce	23 June 2001
Top 10 for 1997: 1. Ultra Naté – "Free"; 2. Olive – "You're Not Alone"; 3. Todd Terry – "Something Goin' On"; 4. Chemical Brothers – "Block Rockin' Beats"; 5. Tina Moore – "Never Gonna Let You Go"; 6. Daft Punk – "Da Funk"; 7. Roni Size – "Brown Paper Bag"; 8. Brainbug – "Nightmare"; 9. Sneaker Pimps – "Spin Spin Sugar"; 10. Double 99 – "Ripgroove"
11	"1998"	Dave Pearce	30 June 2001
Top 10 for 1998: 1. Stardust – "Music Sounds Better with You"; 2. Spacedust – "Gym & Tonic"; 3. Mousse T – "Horny"; 4. Run-D.M.C. vs. Jason Nevins – "It's Like That"; 5. David Morales – "Needin' U"; 6. Energy 52 – "Café del Mar '98"; 7. MJ Cole – "Be Sincere"; 8. Fatboy Slim – "The Rockafeller Skank"; 9. The Wiseguys – "Ooh La La"; 10. Tzant – "Sounds of the Wickedness"
12	"1999"	Dave Pearce	7 July 2001
Top 10 for 1999: 1. Armand van Helden – "You Don't Know Me"; 2. Phats & Small – "Turn Around"; 3. Moloko – "Sing It Back"; 4. Fatboy Slim – "Right Here, Right Now"; 5. Basement Jaxx – "Rendez-Vu"; 6. Soulsearcher – "Can't Get Enough"; 7. ATB – "9 PM (Till I Come)"; 8. Planet Perfecto – "Bullet in the Gun"; 9. Binary Finary – "1999"; 10. Cassius – "Cassius 99"
13	"2000"	Dave Pearce	14 July 2001
Top 10 for 2000: 1. Modjo – "Lady (Hear Me Tonight)"; 2. Spiller – "Groovejet"; 3. Black Legend – "You See the Trouble with Me"; 4. Sonique – "It Feels So Good"; 5. Artful Dodger – "Re-Rewind"; 6. DJ Luck & MC Neat – "With a Little Bit of Luck"; 7. Daft Punk – "One More Time"; 8. Bob Sinclar – "Feel for You"; 9. Azzido Da Bass – "Dooms Night"; 10. Darude – "Sandstorm"
14	"2001"	Dave Pearce	21 July 2001
Top 10 for 2001: 1. Rui da Silva – "Touch Me"; 2. Jakatta – "American Dream"; 3. M&S presents The Girl Next Door – "Salsoul Nugget"; 4. Chocolate Puma – "I Wanna Be You"; 5. DJ Pied Piper and the Masters of Ceremonies – "Do You Really Like It?"; 6. Bel Amour – "Bel Amour"; 7. Eddy Grant – "Electric Avenue"; 8. Roger Sanchez – "Another Chance"; 9. Kosheen – "(Slip & Slide) Suicide"; 10. Basement Jaxx – "Romeo"

== See also ==
Similar programmes

- Gonzo
- NEWsic*
