= CD:UK =

- Title card, used between September 2001 and September 2005.
- Presented by: Ant & Dec; Cat Deeley; James Redmond; Dave Berry; Myleene Klass; Holly Willoughby; Lauren Laverne; Johny Pitts
- Country of origin: United Kingdom
- Original language: English
- No. of series: 8
- No. of episodes: 397

Production
- Executive producer: Conor McAnally
- Producer: Blaze Television
- Production locations: The London Studios (August 1998–January 2003); Riverside Studios (2003–06)
- Running time: 60 minutes (including adverts)
- Production company: Blaze Television

Original release
- Network: ITV
- Release: 29 August 1998 – 1 April 2006

CD:UK (CountDown:United Kingdom), stylised as cd:uk, is a music television programme that ran in the United Kingdom from 29 August 1998 to 1 April 2006. Originally run in conjunction with SMTV Live, the programme aired on ITV as a rival to the BBC's Live & Kicking and was the replacement for The Chart Show, which had been airing on the network for nine years.

In contrast to its predecessor, which only showed music videos, CD:UK was broadcast live on Saturday mornings with a studio audience and featured live performances, as well as star interviews and competitions. It also featured the Saturday Chart, which although was unofficial, usually reflected the new chart positions a day before the official chart was announced on Radio 1. This made the BBC's long-running Top of the Pops, which aired only the night before, seem very out-of-date broadcasting the previous week's chart. CD:UK later utilised an interactive chart based on viewers' votes, called the MiTracks Countdown. The show was sponsored by Tizer from 1999 until 2003, then Ribena from 2003 until 2005, and finally Rimmel from 2005 until its demise.

In 2002, the programme was criticised for showing "raunchy" performances in a slot aimed at children, sparked by a performance of "Dirrty" by Christina Aguilera. In response, a spin-off programme entitled CD:UK Hotshots, featuring music videos which could be considered unsuitable for daytime viewing, was launched in January 2003 and broadcast overnight.

== History ==
=== Presenters ===
The show was at the peak of its popularity between 1998 and 2001, when it was presented by Ant & Dec and Cat Deeley.

CD:UK was originally fronted by the same presenting team for SMTV Live – Ant & Dec and Cat Deeley. It directly aired after its sister show, usually at around 11:30am, and like its predecessor The Chart Show, it was also repeated in a late night slot.

Ant & Dec left both programmes on 1 December 2001 ahead of presenting the Pop Idol live shows. This left Deeley to present CD:UK solo. As time went on, due to her popularity with viewers, Deeley was offered more and more television work and went on to present Stars in Their Eyes and Fame Academy. This meant that she was absent from the show more and more and was frequently replaced by either a celebrity guest or Holly Willoughby from SMTV's successor Ministry of Mayhem. Deeley chose to leave the programme for good in March 2005. TRL presenter Dave Berry presented the programme for several weeks before Holly Willoughby became the new regular host presenting each fortnight with guest presenters such as Kelly Osbourne, Rachel Stevens, Brittany Murphy, Girls Aloud, Natalie Brown and Jayne Middlemiss filling in for the weeks when Willoughby was absent.

=== MiTracks relaunch ===
In August 2005, Myleene Klass was hired as main presenter alongside XFM DJ Lauren Laverne and Trouble TV presenter Johny Pitts as part of a major revamp of the programme, which was duly unveiled on 17 September 2005 with new titles, a redesigned studio and a new chart, the MiTracks Countdown, which allowed viewers to vote for their favourite and least favourite songs on the CD:UK website.

Although it was initially reported that the relaunch had helped double viewing figures, audiences soon dropped below 1 million.

=== Cancellation ===
On 28 December 2005, it was announced that CD:UK was to cease production due to budget issues within the broadcaster. The final regular edition of the show was aired on Saturday 18 March 2006, followed by two compilation programmes on 25 March and 1 April, respectively.

=== Aborted revival ===
On 20 April 2006, it was announced that production company Blaze Television had reached a deal with Five to revive the programme. However, Five announced on 2 June that Klass, Laverne and Pitts would not return to present the show, and that Berry would instead host the show alongside a yet to be decided female presenter, later announced as Caroline Flack. It was also announced that CD:UK would air at 17:30 on Saturday afternoons, and that the show should be back on air, initially by Autumn 2006, later pushed back to some time in 2007. However, nothing on the subject had been heard in several months and it seemed uncertain as to whether the show would return at all. It was officially announced on 17 April 2007 that CD:UK would not be returning.

== Controversies ==
On 2 December 2000, the presenters were forced to apologise on air, alongside a statement from the show's spokesman, following an interview with the guitarist Slash, who used the word "fuck" and made reference to receiving fellatio. A planned item on Slash was pulled from a later episode. The story was covered by BBC News, and later described by Metal Hammer as "a classic example of what happens when you let a jetlagged, half-cut rock star loose in front of the cameras – something that rarely happens these days." On 15 November 2003, Bob Geldof used the word "fuck" on the show during a live segment in which he appeared on a celebrity reviewing panel, necessitating Deeley to apologise.

In 2002, a number of complaints to the Independent Television Commission (ITC) were made following both Christina Aguilera's live performance of "Dirrty", in which the singer wore leather chaps with only her underwear underneath (with 'nasty' written on the rear), and the video broadcast of Holly Valance's "Kiss Kiss", in which she is ostensibly naked. The ITC rejected thirteen complaints but stated they "sympathized with the viewers' concerns" around sexually suggestive performances being broadcast at that time, warning ITV "of the need to be vigilant at times when large numbers of children are watching".

== Music ==
There have been two compilation albums released between 2 October 2000 and 20 January 2001, featuring many of the bands and singers who have performed on the show. Classic artists include: Westlife, Fatboy Slim, Samantha Mumba, S Club 7, Ronan Keating, Five, Steps, Girls Aloud, A1, Britney Spears, Shanks & Bigfoot and Craig David.

=== CD:UK – You Know Where it's At! ===
Disc 1
No.	Title	Artist	Length
1.	"Take On Me"	A1	3:33
2.	"Keep On Movin'"	Five	3:19
3.	"Born to Make You Happy" (Radio Edit)	Britney Spears	3:36
4.	"When You Say Nothing at All"	Ronan Keating	4:17
5.	"Fool Again"	Westlife	3:30
6.	"Reach"	S Club 7	4:00
7.	"Deeper Shade of Blue"	Steps	3:41
8.	"Last One Standing"	Girl Thing	3:08
9.	"Sexbomb" (Peppermint Disco Radio Edit)	Tom Jones & Mousse T	3:16
10.	"All The Small Things"	Blink 182	2:53
11.	"The Bad Touch" (US Radio Edit)	Bloodhound Gang	3:39
12.	"Dirty Water"	Made in London	4:36
13.	"You Do Something to Me"	Dum Dums	3:47
14.	"Gotta Tell You"	Samantha Mumba	3:20
15.	"Say My Name"	Destiny's Child	4:01
16.	"Shackles (Praise You)"	Mary Mary	3:14
17.	"Thong Song"	Sisqo	3:29
18.	"There You Go" (Album Version)	P!nk	3:25
19.	"He Wasn't Man Enough"	Toni Braxton	4:23
20.	"7 Days" (Radio Edit)	Craig David	3:54

Disc 2
No.	Title	Artist	Length
1.	"Out of Your Mind" (Radio Edit)	True Steppers feat Victoria Beckham	3:25
2.	"Freestyler"	Bomfunk MCs	2:53
3.	"Bang"	Robbie Rivera presents Rhythm Bangers	3:06
4.	"Sandstorm" (Radio Edit)	Darude	3:46
5.	"It Feels So Good"	Sonique	3:47
6.	"With My Own Eyes" (Single Edit)	Sash!	3:41
7.	"On The Beach" (CRW Radio Edit)	York	3:16
8.	"It's My Turn" (Original Mix)	Angelic	3:09
9.	"Girls Like Us"	B15 Project feat Chrissy D & Lady G	3:08
10.	"Airwaves" (Original Mix)	Rank 1	2:58
11.	"Take Your Time" (Illicit Dub)	The Love Bite	3:33
12.	"Tell Me It's Real" (Astro Trex Team Master Mix)	K-Ci & JoJo	3:51
13.	"Mambo Italiano" (Radio Edit)	Shaft	2:49
14.	"Flee Fly Flo"	Fe-m@il	2:50
15.	"I Wanna Love You Forever"	Jessica Simpson	4:04
16.	"Bye Bye Bye"	N-Sync	3:19
17.	"Candy" (Remix)	Mandy Moore	3:42
18.	"New Beginning"	Stephen Gately	3:39
19.	"What a Girl Wants" (Radio Edit)	Christina Aguilera	3:14
20.	"The One"	Backstreet Boys	3:43

=== CD:UK – More Wicked Hits ===
Disc 1
No.	Title	Artist	Length
1.	"My Girl"	Westlife	2:55
2.	"Touch Me"	Rui Da Silva	3:26
3.	"Walking Away"	Craig David	3:25
4.	"Same Old Brand New You"	A1	3:32
5.	"Life Is A Rollercoaster"	Ronan Keating	3:54
6.	"Come On Over Baby (All I Want Is You)"	Christina Aguilera	3:24
7.	"Natural"	S Club 7	3:15
8.	"Lucky"	Britney Spears	3:25
9.	"What About Us"	Point Break	3:28
10.	"She Bangs"	Ricky Martin	4:04
11.	"Body II Body"	Samantha Mumba	3:59
12.	"Pure Shores"	All Saints	4:27
13.	"Most Girls"	P!nk	4:11
14.	"Unleash The Dragon"	Sisqó	3:23
15.	"Country Grammar (Hot S**t)"	Nelly	3:51
16.	"Don't Think I'm Not"	Kandi	3:51
17.	"Why?"	Mis-Teeq	3:41
18.	"Uprockin' Beats"	Bomfunk MC's	3:00
19.	"Show Me The Meaning Of Being Lonely"	Backstreet Boys	3:55
20.	"My Love"	Westlife	3:52

Disc 2
No.	Title	Artist	Length
1.	"Demons"	Fatboy Slim feat Macy Gray	5:54
2.	"Dancing in the Moonlight"	Toploader	3:30
3.	"Buck Rogers"	Feeder	3:13
4.	"I'm Outta Love"	Anastacia	3:48
5.	"Lady (Hear Me Tonight)"	Modjo	3:41
6.	"Phatt Bass"	Warp Brothers Vs Aquagen	2:52
7.	"Sky"	Sonique	4:00
8.	"Body Groove"	Architechs feat Nana	5:15
9.	"Silence"	Delerium feat Sarah McLachlan	3:49
10.	"Feel the Beat"	Darude	3:19
11.	"True Step Tonight"	True Steppers feat Brian Harvey & Donell Jones	3:43
12.	"The Fields of Love"	ATB feat York	3:44
13.	"PistolWhip"	Joshua Ryan	2:34
14.	"It's A Good Life"	Cevin Fisher feat Ramona Keller	4:12
15.	"Girls on Top"	Girl Thing	3:25
16.	"I'll Never Stop"	N-Sync	3:08
17.	"Girl You Know It's True"	Keith And Shane	3:13
18.	"When I Said Goodbye"	Steps	3:33
19.	"Don't Wanna Let You Go"	Five	3:38

== CD:UK Hotshots ==
CD:UK Hotshots was a spin-off programme, aired on the ITV network overnight. Introduced in January 2003, the show was initially presented by Cat Deeley, but she left to make way for MTV presenter Dave Berry who left in the summer of 2005 and was replaced by a rotating presenting team of Myleene Klass, Lauren Laverne and Johny Pitts.

As opposed to the main show, Hotshots consisted of presenters' links and music videos – some of which had been considered unsuitable for broadcast on CD:UK.

== International versions ==
Although the original UK version has ended, an American version of the programme, CD USA, began on DirecTV's The 101 on 21 January 2006. Australian broadcaster Foxtel also air a local version of the show, renamed CD Live, on the Fox8 channel every Saturday evening.

In Italy, the public television channel Rai Due has aired from 2003 to 2007 an Italian version of the show, renamed CD: Live, which replaced Top of the Pops, every Saturday afternoon at 15:00. In Croatia, the public television channel HRT 2 aired a Croatian version of the show, renamed T-Mobile CD Live, from 2007 to 2008 every Friday afternoon at 18:40.
