= Jonny L =

British drum and bass producer (born 1970)

Jonny L, real name Jon Lisners, (born November 1970) is a British drum and bass producer. He has also released music under the alias of Mr. L and was one half of the UK garage duo True Steppers.

== Biography ==
=== Early career (1992–1995) ===
Lisners first came to prominence with the single "Hurt You So" in 1992, popular in the rave scene. The single was sampled and looped in the 1997 track "Oh Boy" by the Fabulous Baker Boys. He signed to XL Recordings, the same label as the Prodigy and SL2. He produced more singles such as "Ooh I Like It" and "Make Me Work".

=== Early drum & bass work (1995–1998) ===
In 1995, he produced drum and bass records, beginning with "I'm Leavin'". With that, he produced two other EPs before his first album Sawtooth in 1997. From this album, the hit single "Piper" proved to be a success even though it was extreme in its sound, although on the album there were other electro-influenced tracks. In 1998, the next album, Magnetic, carried on in a similar vein.

=== Piranha Records and mainstream success (1999–2003) ===
He left XL to form his own record label, Piranha Records in 1999. He continued to produce singles, but these had a darker sound to them. He released a single on the record label Metalheadz in 2002 titled "Synkronize" / "Phreak". "Synkronize" featured vocal sampling speculated to be from Brian Harvey of East 17. Another album, 27 Hours a Day followed with the George W. Bush-sampling single "Let's Roll" in 2003.

As part of True Steppers, Lisners co-wrote and produced the top 10 hits "Buggin" and "Out of Your Mind", featuring Dane Bowers and Victoria Beckham, as well as the No. 25 hit "True Step Tonight" featuring Brian Harvey and Donell Jones. Lisners also co-wrote and produced the garage track "Who Do You Think You Are" and "Do It Till We Drop" for S Club's 2002 album, Seeing Double.

=== Mr L and Lo-Rider (2005–2008) ===
Lisners set up Mr L Records in 2005, paving a more experimental sound for his Mr L alias. In 2007, he started a project with vocalist Paul Cumberbatch (a.k.a. Paul Vibe, who had appeared on some of his earlier singles) called Lo-Rider. Lo-Rider released two singles; the first, "Skinny" was released in 2006, with "Watch Me" being released in 2008. As Mr L, Lisners released the old skool jungle influenced "Oh Yeah" in 2008.

=== Current work (2009–present) ===
After a brief stint on another label, Munk Recordings, Lisners produced a track called "1 N 2" on Hospital Records, for the compilation album Sick Music 2, released on 26 April 2010. The following year, he signed to Spearhead Records.

On 26 November 2012, Sick Music 3 was released by Hospital Records, which contained his track, "Moon".

In November 2013, his fourth album In a Jungle was due for release on Spearhead Records. Much of the album, as the title suggests, is a throw-back to the jungle music movement of the mid-1990s.

In 2015, he started a digital drum & bass label known as 23:22. It currently has five releases.

== Discography ==
=== Albums and EPs ===
- 1992: Jonny L, Hurt You So, Rave Alert - album (Telstar)
- 1996: Jonny L (This Time) – EP (XL Recordings)
- 1996: 2 of Us – EP (XL Recordings)
- 1997: Sawtooth – album (XL Recordings)
- 1998: Magnetic – album (XL Recordings)
- 2000: True Stepping – album (NuLife Recordings, as part of the group True Steppers)
- 2003: 27 Hours a Day – album (Piranha Records)
- 2013: In a Jungle – album (Spearhead Records)
- 2021: Cecile Park – EP (Kniteforce Records)

=== Singles ===
As Jonny L, on XL Recordings:

- 1993: "Ooh I Like It" – UK #73
- 1994: "Make Me Work" – UK #76
- 1995: "I'm Leaving"
- 1997: "Piper" – UK #80
- 1998: "Moving Thru Air"
- 1998: "20 Degrees" (with Silvah Bullet) – UK #66

As Jonny L, on Piranha Records

- 1999: "The Bells" / "Raise" – UK #83
- 1999: "Running" / "Spike"
- 1999: "Selecta" / "Change"
- 2000: "Cut Off" / "Move Upon"
- 2002: "Dirt" / "Trouble"
- 2002: "Synkronize" / "Phreak" – UK #100
- 2003: "Let's Roll" – UK #78
- 2003: "Airwaves"
- 2003: "27 Hours a Day" (Parts 1, 2 and 3 all released before the album)

As Jonny L

- 2005: "Back to Your Roots" (feat. Superfly 7)
- 2009: "Evah" / "Microdaze"
- 2010: "1 N 2" (for Sick Music 2 on Hospital Records)
- 2010: "Dreaming"
- 2011: "The Rave" / "Boy"
- 2012: "Moon" (for Sick Music 3 on Hospital Records)
- 2015: "Synthesize"

As Mr. L:

- 2005: "Back to Your Roots" / "Your Son Needs You"
- 2005: "Moon Walking" / "Turn Up the Bass"
- 2005: "Hey" / "Joe"
- 2006: "This Is Hardcore" / "Voices in My Dreams"
- 2006: "Piper 3" / "Do U"
- 2007: "Enter Night" / "Basics"
- 2008: "Harry" / "Cumberbatch & Wires"
- 2008: "Oh Yeah" / "Come Here"

In Lo-Rider

- 2007: "Skinny"
- 2008: "Watch Me"

Appears on:

- 2008: "I Can't Wait for Love" by Matt Schwartz (as vocalist)
- 2015: Eb4/Connect
- 2016: Does It/Play
- 2016: Hallow/Insight

Unreleased:

- 2007: "White Lies"
