= Hijack (group) =

British hip hop group

Formed in 1986, Hijack were a British hip hop group, hailing from Brixton, London, featuring Kamanchi Sly, DJ Supreme, DJ Undercover, Ulysses, Agent Fritz and Agent Clueso. Their first single, "Style Wars" (Music of Life, 1988) caught the attention of the British hip hop community. Their next release, "Hold No Hostage"/"Doomsday of Rap" (Music of Life, 1989) became an underground hit across Europe, bringing them to the attention of West Coast rapper Ice-T.

== Overview ==
Ice-T signed the group to his own Rhyme Syndicate record label, and they recorded and released the single "The Badman is Robbin'" (Rhyme Syndicate, 1989). The track reached number 56 in the UK Singles Chart. The group's debut album, The Horns of Jericho (Rhyme Syndicate, 1991), was recorded around the same time. Hijack also released the single "Style Wars - Style Warriors Revenge" back on the Music of Life label while they were waiting for their album to be released but Warner (who had a distribution deal with Rhyme Syndicate) did not release the album in the United States.

== The Horns of Jericho (1991-1994) ==
In 1991, The Horns of Jericho was released, but not in the U.S. The group released the single "Daddy Rich" which was popular in the UK. The music video for "Daddy Rich" was shot in Los Angeles.

== Breakup ==
Because Warner Brothers did not release the album to the US market, Hijack soon parted company with the label then later split due to musical differences and went their separate ways. DJ Supreme founded Backbone Records, whilst Kamanchi Sly and DJ Undercover founded Reservoir Records and recorded as Mr Pink and Mr Blonde for a short period. Sly also appeared on Nicolas Dresti's singles "Tha Wildstyle" and "Tha Horns of Jericho". Nicolas assumed the name of DJ Supreme in 1996 which he used until 1998. Kamanchi Sly changed his name to Unknown MC and had chart success with his brother DJ Pied Piper in the UK garage groups Da Click and DJ Pied Piper and the Masters of Ceremonies, whose singles "Good Rhymes" (FFRR, 1999) and "Do You Really Like It?" (Relentless, 2001) reached numbers 14 and one in the UK, respectively.

Since then, Kamanchi Sly released two EPs in 2004. Hijack re-formed and released a single in 2016 under Reservoir Records entitled "Doing What We Wonna Do". Alongside this, Kamanchi Sly has also released some solo music via his channel on YouTube.

After the breakup of Hijack, DJ Supreme went on to release his first solo-project Stolen Beats And Ripped Off Scratches (1992) a breakbeat album and subsequently was invited to the Scratchcon 2000 seminar in San Francisco, California, which was hosted by DJ Qbert. He was honoured to have been a major influence to many now successful DJs like DJ Qbert, DJ Babu and Beastie Boys Mix Master Mike. DJ Supreme, recognised as the earliest prominent hip-hop artist to record under the DJ Supreme moniker, continues to work in record production. One of his projects also included the making of his biographical documentary film, The Turntable Trixters (Hijack 1986 - 1992), which chronicles the history of Hijack. The film was screened by the British Film Institute and is available on DVD. In November 2015, DJ Supreme was presented with the Zulu Nation Wisdom Award at the Universal Zulu Nation's 42nd-anniversary in Leeds, honouring his lifetime contributions to teaching, preservation and structural foundations of hip-hop culture, particularly the art of turntablism. He continues as an active producer under his own Backbone Records label, notably releasing a series of major collaborations including major global hip-hop figures like Ice-T's "Arctic II" (2017) and "Let me in" feat. Masta Ace and DJ Prime Cuts (2026) on his recently released "Boss Strutt Riddim"-Series (2026) featuring many more artists like Durrty Goodz, Trevor Mires, Ireland's RiRa, Mikey Don and more.

== Discography ==
- Style Wars (Music of Life Records, 1988)
- Hold No Hostage / Doomsday of Rap (Music of Life Records, 1989)
- The Badman Is Robbin (Rhyme Syndicate Records, 1990)
- Style Warriors Revenge (Music of Life Records, 1990)
- Daddy Rich (Rhyme Syndicate Records, 1991)
- The Horns of Jericho (Rhyme Syndicate Records, 1991)
- The Original Horns of Jericho / Instrumental Movie Soundtrack (Reservoir Records, 1997)
- The Horns of Jericho 25th Anniversary Release (BackBone Records, 2015)
