= Kele Le Roc =

British singer (born 1975)

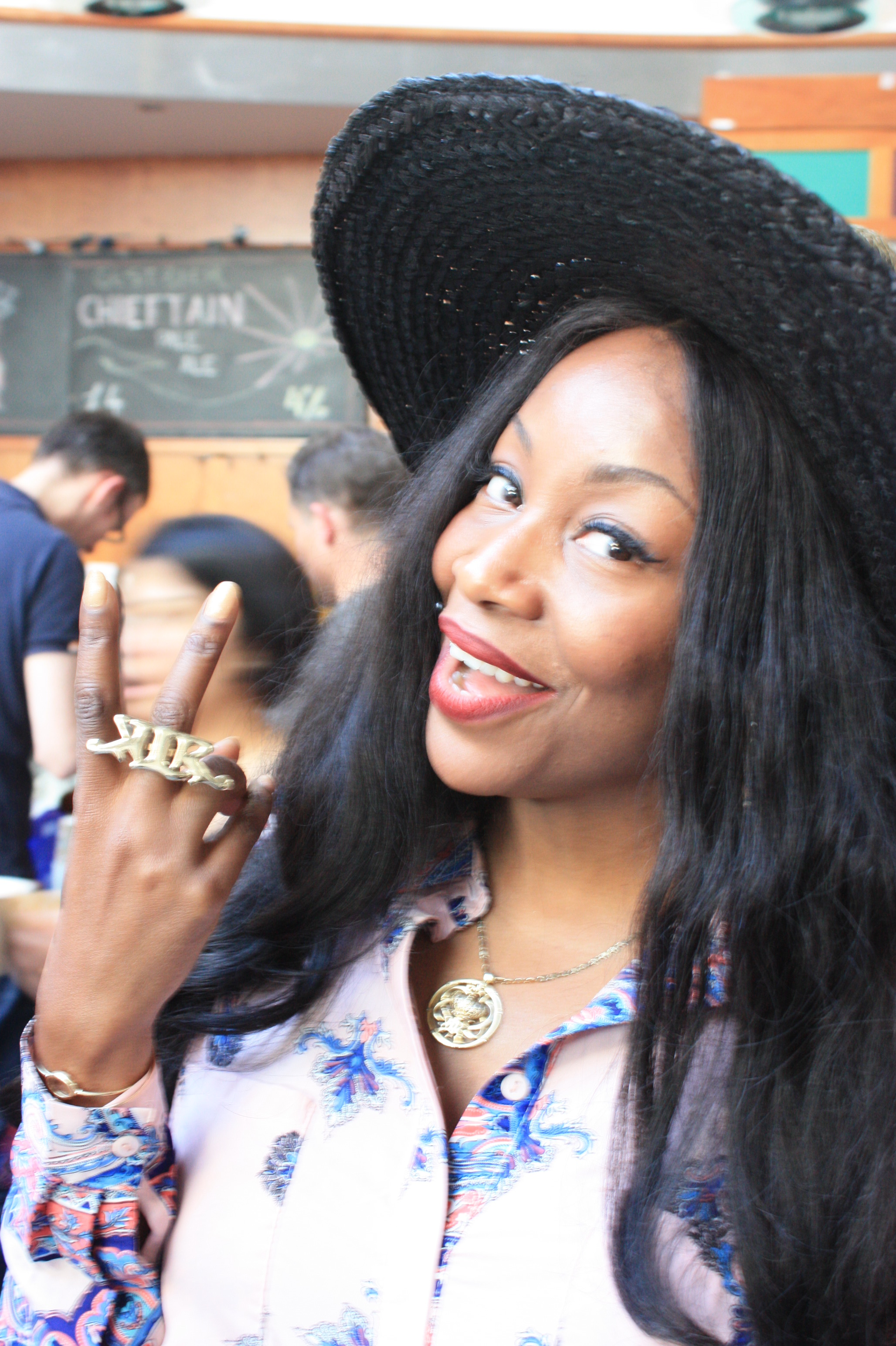
- Kele Le Roc in 2015

Background information
- Born: Kelly Shermaine Biggs; 5 October 1975 (age 50)
- Origin: East Ham, London, England
- Genres: R&B; UK garage
- Years active: 1995–present
- Label: Polydor
- Website: keleleroc.com

Kelly Shermaine Biggs (born 5 October 1975 in East Ham, London), known professionally as Kele Le Roc, is a British singer.

== Career ==
Biggs began singing at the age of three, and she attended Langdon Comprehensive School in East Ham. She first found widespread acclaim in 1995 with the underground hit "Let Me Know". She scored two top 10 hits on the UK Singles Chart, with "Little Bit of Lovin'" in 1998 and "My Love" in 1999; both peaked at No. 8. In March 1999, she released her only album, Everybody's Somebody on Polydor Records.

In 1999, she won two MOBO Awards, for Best Newcomer and for Best Single ("My Love"). Among those she collaborated with are Basement Jaxx (with whom she reached No. 6 in the UK with "Romeo"), 10° Below, Coolio, Courtney Pine, Shy FX, T Power, Omar Lye-Fook, Damage and Lee Henry.

== Discography ==
=== Album ===
- Everybody's Somebody (1999), Wild Card – UK #44

=== Singles ===
- "Let Me Know" (1995), Orchestrated Noize
- "Little Bit of Lovin'" (1998), 1st Avenue/Wild Card/Polydor – UK #8
- "My Love" (1999), 1st Avenue/Wild Card/Polydor – UK #8
- "Retro" (2009), Freelance Diva/OceanFall

As featured artist

- "Thinking of You" (with Curtis Lynch Jr. featuring Red Rat) (2000), Telstar – UK #70
- "Romeo" (with Basement Jaxx) (2001), XL – UK #6, UK Dance #1, UK Indie #1, US Dance #5
- "Things We Do for Love" (with Sticky) (2003)
- "Feelin' U" (with Shy FX and T Power) (2003), London – UK #34
- "Let Me Be Your Fantasy" (with Gok Wan & Craig Knight) (2020)

=== Other appearances ===
- "Not Taking You Back" (True Steppers) (True Stepping, 2000)

== Music videos ==
Title	Year	Director
"Retro"	2009	Leon Mitchell
