= Tina Moore (album) =

1995 studio album by Tina Moore

Studio album by Tina Moore
- Released: 1995; 1997 (European release)
- Genre: R&B
- Length: 42:03 (US); 50:10 (Europe)
- Label: RCA; Street Life; Scotti Brothers Records
- Producer: M. Doc; Kevin Evans (exec. producer); Anthony Ferguson (exec. producer); Tommie Ford; Gerey Johnson; Jere Mc; Michael J. Powell

Tina Moore chronology
Tina Moore (1995)	All in My Vibe (2000)

Singles from Tina Moore
- 1. "Color Me Blue" Released: May 23, 1994; 2. "All I Can Do" Released: August 28, 1995; 3. "Never Gonna Let You Go" Released: 1995; 4. "Nobody Better" Released: 1997

Alternative cover
- Cover for the European version of the album

Professional ratings
Review scores
Source	Rating
AllMusic	2.5/5 stars
Cash Box	(favorable)

Tina Moore is the debut album by American R&B singer Tina Moore, originally released in 1995. It includes the singles "Color Me Blue," which reached number 73 on the US Hot R&B/Hip-Hop Songs chart, "All I Can Do," which reached number 48, and "Never Gonna Let You Go," which peaked at number 27.

The album was released in Europe in 1997 with two extra tracks, including the UK garage version of "Never Gonna Let You Go," which reached number seven on the UK Singles Chart. A remix of "Nobody Better" was also released as a single, reaching number 20 in the UK in 1998.

== Track listing ==
No.	Title	Writer(s)	Length
1.	"Never Gonna Let You Go"	Tina Moore; Tommie Ford	4:14
2.	"All I Can Do"	Andrea Martin; Greg Smith	5:11
3.	"Waiting"	Moore; Ford; E.G. Fullalove	4:22
4.	"At Last"	Harry Warren; Mack Gordon	3:05
5.	"Love Don't Feel Like Love"	Curtis Boone; Michael J. Powell	4:13
6.	"Nobody Better"	Moore; Jeremiah McAllister; Steve Carter	3:49
7.	"Tell Me How You Like to Be Done"	Moore; Ford	4:15
8.	"Color Me Blue"	Gerey Johnson; Lisa Gushiniere; Ron Harris	4:34
9.	"Follow Your Heart"	Moore; Ford	4:48
10.	"Never Without Love"	Moore; Ford	4:18

1997 European version extra tracks
No.	Title	Writer(s)	Length
11.	"Never Gonna Let You Go" (Kelly G. Bump N Go Vocal Edit)	Moore; Ford	4:12
12.	"Never Gonna Let You Go" (Kelly G. Bump N Go Dub)	Moore; Ford	3:55

== Personnel ==
Adapted from AllMusic.

- Tina Moore – primary artist, background vocals
- Scott Ahaus – mixing
- Paul D. Allen – assistant engineer, drums, keyboard programming, keyboards
- Curtiss Boone – arranger, drum programming, keyboards
- Johnny Buzzerio – photography
- Irving Collier – background vocals
- Tony Dawsey – mastering
- M. Doc – producer
- Kevin Evans – executive producer
- Vernon D. Fails – keyboards, piano
- Anthony Ferguson – executive producer
- Tommie Ford – bass, drums, keyboards, mixing, producer
- Doug Haverty – art direction
- Gerey Johnson – drum programming, keyboard programming, mixing, producer
- Ben Keys – assistant engineer
- Jere Mc – guitar, producer
- David McMurray – saxophone
- Clell Moore – assistant engineer
- Ron Otis – drums
- Robert Owens – background vocals
- Michael J. Powell – arranger, drum programming, engineer, guitar, keyboard programming, keyboards, mixing, percussion, producer, rhythm arrangements
- Paul Riser – string arrangements
- Gerard Smerek – engineer, mixing
- Al Turner – bass
- Daniel Weatherspoon – piano
- Mario Winans – drums

== Charts ==
Chart (1995)	Peak position
US Top R&B/Hip-Hop Albums (Billboard)	90
