= My Love (Kele Le Roc song) =

1999 single by Kele Le Roc

Single by Kele Le Roc

from the album Everybody's Somebody
- Released: 15 March 1999
- Genre: UK garage (remixes)
- Length: 3:56
- Label: Polydor; Wildcard; 1st Avenue
- Songwriters: Bradley Spalter; Louise Francis; Robbie Nevil
- Producers: Bradley Spalter; Robbie Nevil

Kele Le Roc singles chronology
"Little Bit of Lovin'" (1998)	"My Love" (1999)	"Thinking of You" (2000)

Audio
- "My Love" on YouTube

"My Love" is a song by British singer Kele Le Roc. It was released on 15 March 1999 as the second single from her debut album, Everybody's Somebody. Like her previous single "Little Bit of Lovin'", the song peaked at No. 8 on the UK Singles Chart, and it also peaked at No. 48 in New Zealand in January 2001. In 1999, the song won a MOBO Award for Best Single. Several remixes of the song became underground hits in the UK.

== Remixes ==
Two garage remixes by 10º Below were underground hits in the UK garage scene in 1999: the 10º Below Vocal Mix and 10º Below Dub Mix. In 2008, a new set of remixes was released on Ice Cream Records titled "My Love (So Good)", featuring mixes by 10º Below, J-Sweet, and X-Men. The Paul Masterson remix was a hit on the London club scene in the early 2000s.

In 2018, the House & Garage Orchestra together with Le Roc recorded an orchestral version of the 10° Below Vocal Mix for the UK garage covers album Garage Classics.

== Impact and legacy ==
"My Love" won the MOBO Award for Best Single in 1999. In November 2016, UK duo Gorgon City compiled a list of their top UK garage songs for Billboard, with "My Love (10º Below Mix)" at No. 17. In September 2019, NME included the 10º Below Mix of "My Love" in their "25 essential UK garage anthems" list. Mixmag included the 10º Below Mix of "My Love" in their list of "16 of the Best Uplifting Vocal Garage Tracks". Capital Xtra included the 10º Below Mix in their list of "The Best Old-School Garage Anthems of All Time".

== Track listings ==
UK CD1

1. "My Love" (7-inch Rude Boy edit) – 3:53
2. "Forlorn – 5:03
3. "Little Bit of Lovin'" (live from the Criterion) – 3:37

UK CD2 and Japanese CD single (The Mixes)

1. "My Love" (7-inch Rude Boy edit) – 3:56
2. "My Love" (Ignorants edit) – 3:43
3. "My Love" (M!s Lush vocal edit) – 4:12
4. "My Love" (Paul Masterson club mix) – 7:33

UK cassette single

1. "My Love" (7-inch Rude Boy edit) – 3:56
2. "Forlorn – 5:03

== Charts ==
=== Weekly charts ===
Chart (1999–2001)	Peak position
Europe (Eurochart Hot 100)	38
New Zealand (Recorded Music NZ)	48
Scottish Singles Sales (Official Charts)	35
UK Singles (Official Charts)	8
UK Hip Hop/R&B (Official Charts)	2

=== Year-end charts ===
Chart (1999)	Position
UK Singles (OCC)	178
UK Club Chart (Music Week)	37
UK Pop (Music Week)	13
UK Urban (Music Week)	18

== Release history ==
Region	Date	Format(s)	Label(s)	Ref.
United Kingdom	15 March 1999	CD; cassette	Polydor; Wildcard; 1st Avenue	
Japan	21 April 1999	CD	Polydor; Wildcard; 1st Avenue	
