= Buggin =

2000 single by True Steppers

Single by True Steppers featuring Dane Bowers

from the album True Stepping
- Released: 17 April 2000
- Genre: UK garage
- Length: 3:32
- Label: NuLife
- Songwriters: Andy Lysandrou, Dane Bowers, John Lisners
- Producer: John Lisners

True Steppers singles chronology
"Beng Beng" (1999)	"Buggin" (2000)	"Out of Your Mind" (2000)

Dane Bowers singles chronology
"Buggin" (2000)	"Out of Your Mind" (2000)

"Buggin" is a song by UK garage duo True Steppers featuring singer Dane Bowers of Another Level. It was released as a single on 17 April 2000 and was a top-10 hit in the United Kingdom, peaking at No. 6 on the UK Singles Chart and No. 2 on the UK Dance Singles Chart.

== Track listings ==
UK CD single

1. "Buggin" (radio edit)
2. "Buggin"
3. "Buggin" (10° Below vocal dub)

UK cassette single

1. "Buggin"
2. "Buggin" (radio edit)

== Charts ==
=== Weekly charts ===
Chart (2000)	Peak position
Europe (Eurochart Hot 100)	35
Scotland (OCC)	27
UK Singles (OCC)	6
UK Airplay (Music Week)	23
UK Dance (OCC)	2

=== Year-end charts ===
Chart (2000)	Position
UK Singles (OCC)	119
