= Da Click =

Inactive British garage group

- Origin: England
- Genres: UK garage
- Years active: 1998–2000
- Labels: FFRR Records, Soul Food Recordings
- Past members: Pied Piper; MC Creed; PSG; Unknown MC; Valerie M

Da Click were a UK garage group which consisted of DJ/producer Pied Piper (Eugene Nwohia), emcees Creed (Christopher Reid), PSG (Paul Gabriel) and Unknown MC (Ronnie Nwohia), and singer Valerie M (Valerie Malcolm). They are best known for their UK chart hit single "Good Rhymes", which reached No. 14 on the UK Singles Chart in January 1999, and spent 6 weeks on the chart. Their second single, "We Are Da Click" was a top 40 hit, peaking at No. 38.

"Good Rhymes" interpolates "Good Times" by Chic and "Never Too Much" by Luther Vandross. "We Are Da Click" interpolates "Funkin' for Jamaica (N.Y.)" by Tom Browne.

DJ Pied Piper and Unknown MC would go on to have a UK number one single in 2001 with "Do You Really Like It?", as part of the collaboration known as DJ Pied Piper and the Masters of Ceremonies.

In 2013, MC Creed appeared alongside many other garage pioneers in a documentary exploring the legacy of UK garage, Rewind 4Ever: The History of UK Garage.

== Discography ==
=== Singles ===
Title	Year	Peak chart positions
Title	Year	UK
"Good Rhymes"	1999	14
"We Are Da Click"	1999	38
"Millennium Maddness"	2000	–
