= Ben Onono =

British-Nigerian musician

Ben Onono (sometime stylised as Ben OnOnO) is a musician and songwriter. He is of British and Nigerian heritage. A scholar student at the Royal Academy of Music in London where he trained as a pianist. In 2002 he co-wrote the Ivor Novello award-nominated worldwide hit single "It Just Won't Do" with Tim Deluxe. His top-five hit song "Rainbow of Love" with Bob Sinclar was used in the 2011 Alfa Romeo advertising campaign. The track was the single for the Grammy-nominated album Made in Jamaica with Sly and Robbie. Ben Onono was the featured vocalist and writer of Saffron Hill's 2003 "My Love Is Always", as well as the character in its music video. The song charted Top 20 on the UK Singles Chart. His song "Fallen Hero" with NuFrequency remains the number-one most charted song ever on the tastemaker website Resident Advisor. Onono has written material for David Guetta, Cicada, Fatboy Slim, Rui Da Silva, Futureshock, Natalie Imbruglia among others.

From his debut Native Stranger, the track "Blink" was featured on the soundtrack for the TV series Long Way Down. The entire album featured across the six-part BBC series starring Ewan McGregor. Also, from Native Stranger, the song "Count to 10" was used for the Netflix movie trailer of Special Correspondents starring Ricky Gervais. His song "Never had a Dream Come True" was featured in the movie John Tucker Must Die, starring Jesse Metcalfe. Other songs have featured in the USA TV series The Shield, Nip/Tuck, and Las Vegas.

Other film/TV credits include the adaptation of the award-winning Half of a Yellow Sun, starring Chiwetel Ejiofor and Thandiwe Newton, 2 series of the MTV Base award-winning series Shuga, and BBC 1 movie Danny and the Human Zoo.

== Discography ==
=== Studio albums ===
- Badagry Beach (2000)
- Native Stranger (2008)
