= Nobody Better =

Single by Tina Moore

from the album Tina Moore
- Released: 1997
- Genre: R&B (1995 version); 2-step garage (1997 Kelly G remix)
- Label: Delirious Records
- Songwriters: J. McAllister; Tina Moore
- Producers: Jere MC; M. Doc

Tina Moore singles chronology
"Never Gonna Let You Go" (1995/1997)	"Nobody Better" (1997)

Music video
- "Nobody Better" on YouTube

"Nobody Better" is a song co-written and performed by American singer Tina Moore. The original version of the song appears on her 1995 self-titled debut album. Like her previous single "Never Gonna Let You Go", a 2-step garage remix by Kelly G was released on the Delirious label in 1997. It was a top 20 hit in the UK, peaking at No. 20 on the UK Singles Chart in early 1998. Single formats also include another garage remix by Dem 2, 'Dem 2's Luv Unlimited Mix', and an R&B remix by Blacksmith.

== Critical reception ==
A reviewer from Music Week complimented Moore's distinctive wailing vocal style and "excellent" mixes. The song was described as "less immediately catchy" than "Never Gonna Let You Go", "but certainly matches up to its predecessor in terms of quality." Record Mirror Dance Update gave "Nobody Better" a full score of five out of five and named it Tune of the Week, writing, "Needless to say, they [Dem 2] pull this off brilliantly, creating so much depth and space allowing Tina Moore's sultry vocal to shine through. In massive demand already with very limited one-sided promo mailout, this will fly."

== Track listing ==
- CD maxi-single
1. "Nobody Better" (Kelly G radio edit)
2. "Nobody Better" (Dem 2's Luv Unlimited remix)
3. "Nobody Better" (Blacksmith R'n'B rub)
4. "Never Gonna Let You Go" (Kelly G Bump-N-Go vocal mix)

== Charts ==
=== Weekly charts ===
Chart (1998)	Peak position
UK Singles (OCC)	20
UK Dance (OCC)	2
UK Hip Hop/R&B (OCC)	4

=== Year-end charts ===
Chart (1998)	Position
UK Urban (Music Week)	12
