= True Step Tonight =

Single by True Steppers featuring Brian Harvey and Donell Jones

from the album True Stepping
- Released: 20 November 2000
- Recorded: 2000
- Genre: UK garage
- Label: NuLife

True Steppers singles chronology
"Out of Your Mind" (2000)	"True Step Tonight" (2000)

Brian Harvey singles chronology
"True Step Tonight" (2000)	"Straight Up (No Bends)" (2001)

"True Step Tonight" is a song by UK garage duo True Steppers, released as their third single, featuring former East 17 singer Brian Harvey and U.S. R&B star Donell Jones on guest vocals. It reached number 25 on the UK Singles Chart.

== Track listing ==
1. "True Step Tonight" (Radio Edit)
2. "True Step Tonight" (Zero Absolute Vocal Mix)
3. "True Step Tonight" (X-Men vs 10 Degrees Below Dub)
