= DJ Supreme =

DJ Supreme may refer to:

- Space Cowboy (musician) (born 1975), formerly known as "DJ Supreme"
- DJ Supreme, former member of Hijack (group)
