= Loving You (Ole Ole Ole) =

Single by Brian Harvey featuring The Refugee Crew

from the album Solo
- B-side: "Chains"
- Released: 15 October 2001
- Recorded: 2001
- Genre: Pop
- Length: 4:06
- Label: Edel
- Songwriter: Wyclef Jean
- Producers: Wyclef Jean; Jerry Duplessis

Brian Harvey featuring The Refugee Crew singles chronology
"Straight Up (No Bends)" (2001)	"Loving You (Ole Ole Ole)" (2001)	"I Can" (2007)

"Loving You (Ole Ole Ole)" is the second single from Brian Harvey's debut solo album, Solo. The track is a collaboration with The Refugee Crew. The single was released on 15 October 2001, reaching #20 on the UK Singles Chart.

== Music video ==
The official music video for the song was directed by Andy Morahan.

== Track listing ==
UK CD1 (0132325ERE)

1. "Loving You (Ole Ole Ole)" - 4:05
2. "Chains" - 3:36
3. "Loving You (Ole Ole Ole)" (Brian Harvey Only) - 3:26
4. "Loving You (Ole Ole Ole)" (CD-Rom Video) - 4:10

UK CD2 (0133045ERE)

1. "Loving You (Ole Ole Ole)" (Original) - 4:05
2. "Loving You (Ole Ole Ole)" (Ignorants Remix) - 4:10
3. "Loving You (Ole Ole Ole)" (Ignorants Dub) - 4:10
