= Straight Up (No Bends) =

2001 song by Brian Harvey

Single by Brian Harvey

from the album Solo
- A-side: "Straight Up (No Bends)"
- Released: 23 April 2001
- Genre: Pop
- Length: 3:15
- Label: Edel
- Songwriter: Lea Callaway

Brian Harvey singles chronology
"True Step Tonight" (2000)	"Straight Up (No Bends)" (2001)	"Loving You (Ole Ole Ole)" (2001)

"Straight Up (No Bends)" is the debut solo single by East 17 singer Brian Harvey. The single was released on 23 April 2001 and reached #26 on the UK Singles Chart.

== Track listing ==
1. "Straight Up (No Bends)" (Radio Edit)
2. "Straight Up (No Bends)" (Gee Smoove &Stylus Roughhouse Remix)
3. "Straight Up (No Bends)" (Ignorants Remix)
4. "Straight Up (No Bends)" (Video)
