= Little Bit of Lovin' =

1998 single by Kele Le Roc

Single by Kele Le Roc

from the album Everybody's Somebody
- B-side: "Let Me Know"
- Released: 19 October 1998
- Length: 4:05
- Label: Polydor, Wildcard, 1st Avenue
- Songwriters: Bradley Spalter, Robbie Nevil, Gordon Chambers
- Producers: Bradley Spalter, Robbie Nevil

Kele Le Roc singles chronology
"Let Me Know" (1996)	"Little Bit of Lovin'" (1998)	"My Love" (1999)

"Little Bit of Lovin'" is a song by British R&B singer Kele Le Roc. It was released as a single on 19 October 1998 as the first single from her 1999 debut album, Everybody's Somebody, and peaked at No. 8 on the UK Singles Chart. It also reached No. 1 on the UK R&B Singles Chart and No. 100 in the Netherlands.

== Track listings ==
UK CD and cassette single

1. "Little Bit of Lovin'" (7-inch Rude Boy edit) – 4:05
2. "Let Me Know" – 4:32

UK, European, Australian, and Japanese maxi-CD single

1. "Little Bit of Lovin'" (7-inch Rude Boy edit) – 4:05
2. "Little Bit of Lovin'" (Tuff Jam's classic garage mix) – 6:47
3. "Little Bit of Lovin'" (Soul Power vocal nix) – 4:00
4. "Little Bit of Lovin'" (Tic Tac mix) – 3:34

== Charts ==
=== Weekly charts ===
Chart (1998–1999)	Peak position
Europe (Eurochart Hot 100)	43
Netherlands (Single Top 100)	100
Scottish Singles Sales (Official Charts)	22
UK Singles (Official Charts)	8
UK Hip Hop/R&B (Official Charts)	1

=== Year-end charts ===
Chart (1998)	Position
UK Singles (OCC)	150

== Release history ==
Region	Date	Format(s)	Label(s)	Ref.
United Kingdom	19 October 1998	CD; cassette	Polydor; Wildcard; 1st Avenue	
Japan	3 March 1999	CD	Polydor; Wildcard; 1st Avenue	
