= RipGroove =

Single by Double 99

from the album 7th High
- Released: 1997
- Genre: Speed garage
- Label: Satellite Recordings; Logic Records (U.S.)
- Songwriters: Tim Liken; Omar Adimora
- Producers: Tim Liken; Omar Adimora

Double 99 singles chronology
"RipGroove" (1997)	"Freakazoid" (2000)

"RipGroove" is the debut single by English speed garage duo Double 99. A huge underground UK club hit in 1997 when first released on an EP under their alias R.I.P. Productions, the song was officially released as a single twice, first in May 1997 where it reached No. 31 on the UK Singles Chart, then again in October in a new mix featuring vocals by MC Top Cat, peaking seventeen places higher at No. 14. The song appeared on their sole album, 7th High, released in 2001.

The song contains samples of Armand van Helden's Drum 'n' Bass Mix of CJ Bolland's "Sugar Is Sweeter", DJ Gunshot's "Wheel 'n' Deal", Barbara Tucker's "I Get Lifted (The Underground Network Mix)" and a vocal sample from the Kelly G Bump-N-Go Vocal Mix of Tina Moore's "Never Gonna Let You Go".

On 14 October 2022, a new set of remixes as well as a new rerecorded version were released to celebrate its 25th anniversary.

== Critical reception ==
Tim Jeffery from Music Week's RM rated "RipGroove" four out of five, writing, "The hype surrounding this record is more about London's Sunday night "speed garage" scene than the actual record itself. It's a good groove for sure, borrowing sounds and ideas from Armand Van Helden and whacking a hefty dub bassline and some distorted ranting over the top – a combination that usually elicits the comment "it sounds just like Tori Amos". Basic it is but 'R.I.P.' is a grower and if the "speed garage" scene continues to attract more disillusioned drum & bass followers it could be an important record in as much as it sets the standard and style for other more adventurous dub/house combinations to follow."

== Impact and legacy ==
"RipGroove" is often credited as one of the key tracks that founded the speed garage scene.

In a 2013 interview with The Guardian, DJ EZ listed "RipGroove" as one of his favourite tracks: "Still going strong, a mainstay in my sets for 15 years now."

In 2016 for Dummy Mag, UK garage musician Wookie ranked the song at number two in his list of the "10 Best Garage Tracks", saying "Undeniably a game changer from my boys Tim and Omar. I still drop this regularly in my sets without hesitation."

In November 2016, UK duo Gorgon City compiled a list of their top UK garage songs for Billboard, with "RipGroove" at number three.

Mixmag included "RipGroove" in their lists of "The 15 Best Speed Garage Records Released in '97 and '98" in 2018 and "The Best Basslines in Dance Music" in 2020.

The Guardian listed the song at number nine in their list of "The best UK garage tracks - ranked!" in 2019.

Redbull.com included the song in their "Honorable mentions" list of "underground UK garage classics that still sound fresh today".

Rolling Stone ranked it number 189 in their list of the "200 Greatest Dance Songs of All Time" in 2022.

== Track listings ==
- UK CD single
1. "RipGroove" (Radio Edit) (3:22)
2. "RipGroove" (Original Mix) (6:10)
3. "Up with You" (5:47)
4. "RipGroove" (Riphousz Mix) (5:58)
- UK CD single reissue
1. "RipGroove" (Radio Edit featuring Top Cat) (3:31)
2. "RipGroove" (Original Mix) (6:09)
3. "RipGroove" (Vocal Club Mix) (6:09)
4. "RipGroove" (Tuff Jam's Groove Dub) (6:30)
- 25th Anniversary release
1. "RipGroove" (Reimagination) [The Directors Cut]
2. "RipGroove" (Rerecorded Original Mix)
3. "RipGroove" (Double 99 vs 10 Below Remix)
4. "RipGroove" (Ewan McVicar 'Drop for 34 Knots' Mix)
5. "RipGroove" (Fixate Remix)
6. "RipGroove" (Reimagination) [Club Mix]
7. "RipGroove" (Daffy Remix)

== Charts ==
=== Weekly charts ===
Chart (1997)	Peak position
Canada Dance/Urban (RPM)	2
UK Singles (Official Charts)	31
UK Singles (Official Charts) (reissue)	14
UK Dance (Official Charts)	1

=== Year-end charts ===
Chart (1997)	Position
Canada Dance/Urban (RPM)	22
UK Club Chart (Music Week)	68
