= Out of Your Mind =

2000 single by True Steppers and Dane Bowers

Single by True Steppers and Dane Bowers featuring Victoria Beckham

from the album True Stepping
- Released: 14 August 2000
- Genre: 2-step garage
- Length: 3:27
- Label: BMG; Star-Write; NuLife; Ice Cream
- Songwriters: Victoria Adams; Dane Bowers; Andy Lysandrou; Johnny Lisners
- Producer: Johnny Lisners

True Steppers singles chronology
"Buggin" (2000)	"Out of Your Mind" (2000)	"True Step Tonight" (2000)

Victoria Beckham singles chronology
"Out of Your Mind" (2000)	"Not Such an Innocent Girl" (2001)

Dane Bowers singles chronology
"Buggin" (2000)	"Out of Your Mind" (2000)	"Shut Up... and Forget About It" (2001)

Music video
- "Out of Your Mind" on YouTube

"Out of Your Mind" is a song by UK garage duo True Steppers and Dane Bowers. It features Victoria Beckham, in her first appearance as a solo artist away from Spice Girls. The single was released on 14 August 2000 and reached number two on the UK Singles Chart, beaten to the top by Spiller's "Groovejet (If This Ain't Love)" in a highly publicised chart battle.

== Background and composition ==
Explaining her collaboration with Dane Bowers, Beckham said she loved dance music and was "flattered" to be asked to sing on the track.

== Chart performance ==
In the United Kingdom, the single was released the same week as Spiller's "Groovejet (If This Ain't Love)", which features Sophie Ellis-Bextor. Although "Out of Your Mind" was predicted to be number one until Saturday, "Groovejet" outsold it by 20,000 copies by Sunday, holding it back to the number-two position. "Out of Your Mind" sold 180,584 copies during its first week and has sold over 400,000 copies in the UK as of June 2017. It was certified gold by the British Phonographic Industry and was the 21st-best-seller of 2000 in the UK.

== Availability on streaming services ==
The track was unavailable on streaming services such as Spotify until June 2018. According to the BBC, a Twitter account named Pop Music Activism that lobbies record labels to make forgotten hits available online was "flooded" with requests for the song.

== Track listings ==
- UK and Australian CD single
1. "Out of Your Mind" (radio edit) – 3:27
2. "Out of Your Mind" (10° Below vs. X. Men vocal mix) – 4:12
3. "Out of Your Mind" (10° Below dub) – 4:25
- UK 12-inch single
1. "Out of Your Mind" (12-inch mix) – 5:02
2. "Out of Your Mind" ([10° Below vs. X. Men vocal mix) – 4:12
3. "Out of Your Mind" (10° Below dub) – 4:30
- UK cassette single and European CD single
1. "Out of Your Mind" (radio edit) – 3:25
2. "Out of Your Mind" (10 Degrees Below vs. X. Men vocal mix) – 4:12

== Charts ==
=== Weekly charts ===
Chart (2000)	Peak position
Australia (ARIA)	27
Belgium (Ultratop 50 Flanders)	39
Belgium (Ultratip Bubbling Under Wallonia)	8
Europe (European Hot 100 Singles)	14
Greece (IFPI)	9
Iceland (Íslenski Listinn Topp 40)	13
Ireland (IRMA)	4
Ireland Dance (IRMA)	2
Italy (FIMI)	33
Netherlands (Dutch Top 40)	16
Netherlands (Single Top 100)	16
Norway (VG-lista)	5
Scottish Singles Sales (Official Charts)	2
Sweden (Sverigetopplistan)	23
Switzerland (Schweizer Hitparade)	98
UK Singles (Official Charts)	2
UK Airplay (Music Week)	3
UK Dance (Official Charts)	10

Chart (2026)	Peak position
UK Singles Downloads (OCC)	26
UK Singles Sales (OCC)	30

=== Year-end charts ===
Chart (2000)	Position
Iceland (Íslenski Listinn Topp 40)	86
Ireland (IRMA)	51
UK Singles (OCC)	21

== Certifications ==
Region	Certification	Certified units/sales
United Kingdom (BPI)	Gold	400,000^{^}
^{^} Shipments figures based on certification alone.
