= Battle (song) =

2000 single by Wookie

Single by Wookie featuring Lain

from the album Wookie
- Released: 31 July 2000
- Studio: Soul II Soul (London, England)
- Genre: UK garage
- Length: 5:01
- Label: S2S; PIAS
- Songwriters: Jason Chue; Lain Gray
- Producer: Wookie

Wookie singles chronology
"What's Going On" (2000)	"Battle" (2000)	"Get Enuff" (2000)

Audio
- "Battle" on YouTube

"Battle" is a song by UK garage musician Wookie featuring vocals from Lain. It was released on 31 July 2000 as the third single from Wookie's self-titled debut and only studio album (2000). Upon its release, the song reached number 10 on the UK Singles Chart and number 81 in the Netherlands. British newspaper The Guardian ranked the track at number one on their list of the Best UK Garage Tracks in 2019.

== Release and reception ==
S2S and PIAS Recordings released "Battle" in the United Kingdom on 31 July 2000 as a CD and 12-inch vinyl single. Six days later, the song debuted at number 10 on the UK Singles Chart, becoming Wookie's first and only single to reach the UK top 30. The song also appeared on the Dutch Single Top 100, where it charted for one week at number 81 in September 2000. Critically, British trade paper Music Week called the track "innovative" and "distinctive", noting its crossover potential. In 2019, The Guardian published their list of the Best UK Garage Tracks, giving first place to "Battle" for its "beautiful" production and writing that the song's "soulful" vocals and gospel-influenced lyrics about surmounting conflict could be perceived as a response to the CeCe Rogers song "Someday". Capital Xtra included the song in their list of "The Best Old-School Garage Anthems of All Time".

== Track listings ==
UK CD single

1. "Battle" (radio edit)
2. "Battle" (Dobie mix part 1)
3. "Battle" (M.J. Cole mix)

UK 12-inch single

A1. "Battle" (full mix)
B1. "Battle" (M.J. Cole mix)
B2. "Battle" (Dobie mix part 1)

UK cassette single

1. "Battle" (radio edit)
2. "Battle" (M.J. Cole mix)

European CD single

1. "Battle" (radio edit)
2. "Battle" (Dobie mix part 1)

Australian CD single

1. "Battle" (radio edit)
2. "Battle" (Dobie mix part 1)
3. "Battle" (M.J. Cole mix)
4. "Battle" (full mix)

== Credits and personnel ==
Credits are taken from the UK CD single liner notes.

Studio

- Recorded at Soul II Soul Studios (London, England)

Personnel

- Wookie – writing (as Jason Chue), production
- Lain Gray – writing, vocals
- Ed Colman – engineering
- John Davis – cutting
- Tomato – sleeve artwork
- Takay – photography

== Charts ==
Chart (2000)	Peak position
Europe (Eurochart Hot 100)	38
Netherlands (Dutch Top 40 Tipparade)	12
Netherlands (Single Top 100)	81
Scotland Singles (OCC)	50
UK Singles (OCC)	10
UK Dance (OCC)	2
UK Indie (OCC)	1

== Release history ==
Region	Date	Format(s)	Label(s)	Ref.
United Kingdom	31 July 2000	12-inch vinyl; CD	S2S; PIAS	
Australia	22 January 2001	CD	S2S; PIAS; DanceNet	
