= Sawtooth (album) =

Studio album by Jonny L
- Released: 17 November 1997
- Genre: Drum and bass, breakbeat
- Length: 59:41

Sawtooth is the debut album by British electronic musician Jonny L. The album was released on 17 November 1997 on CD and in a 5 × 10 box set.

== Track listing ==
Track listing is identical for both releases.

1. "Treading" – 5:35
2. "Piper" – 5:59
3. "S4" – 5:22
4. "Wish U Had Something" – 6:24
5. "Detroit" – 5:26
6. "Two of Us" – 6:25
7. "Tychonic Cycle" – 6:48
8. "Moving Thru Air" – 5:55
9. "I Let U" – 5:06
10. "Obedience" – 6:41

== Reception ==
AllMusic gave the album 4/5 stars.
