= Tim Deluxe =

British DJ (born 1977)

- Born: Timothy Andrew Liken; 18 July 1977 (age 48); London, United Kingdom
- Genres: House; UK garage
- Occupations: DJ; producer
- Years active: 1995–present
- Labels: Ice Cream; Deluxe

Timothy Andrew Liken (born 18 July 1977), also known by his stage name as Tim Deluxe, is a British DJ and producer. He is best known for the song "It Just Won't Do", which charted in many countries.

== Biography ==
Deluxe grew up in North London and worked at Time Is Right Records at the age of 14 and debuted for Ministry of Sound as a DJ in replacement of CJ Mackintosh before he turned eighteen. In 1994, Deluxe met Omar Amidora, a graphic designer and Andy Lysandrou, the label owner of Boogie Beat. In a joint venture, they launched Ice Cream Records, a record label and released a number of EPs as R.I.P. Productions. In 1997, Amidora and Deluxe had a number 14 hit single on the UK Singles Chart with "RipGroove" under the name Double 99. In 2001, Deluxe pursued a solo career as a music producer, with "Sirens" as his debut single. The song was signed to Darren Emerson's record label Underwater Records. In 2002, Deluxe released his most successful single "It Just Won't Do", which features the vocals of singer-songwriter Sam Obernik. Alongside his production career, his deejaying had seen more success with gigs in the United Kingdom. In 2003, Deluxe released his debut studio album The Little Ginger Club Kid and held an exclusive residency in Ibiza. His second and third studio albums titled Ego Death and The Radicle were released in 2006 and 2015 respectively.

== Discography ==
=== Studio albums ===
Title	Details
The Little Ginger Club Kid	Released: 27 January 2004; Label: Underwater Records; Format: Digital download, CD
Ego Death	Released: 28 November 2006; Label: Beat Records; Format: Digital download, CD
The Radicle	Released: 30 October 2015; Label: Strictly Rhythm; Format: Digital download, CD

=== Charted singles ===
==== As himself ====
Title	Year	Peak chart positions									Album
Title	Year	UK	AUS	BEL	FRA	GER	JPN	NL	SPN	SWI	Album
"Sirens"	2001	87	—	—	—	—	—	—	—	—	Non-album single
"It Just Won't Do" (featuring Sam Obernik)	2002	14	13	18	60	77	—	10	7	57	The Little Ginger Club Kid
"Less Talk More Action!"	2003	45	65	—	—	—	—	—	—	—	The Little Ginger Club Kid
"Mundaya (The Boy)" (featuring Shahin Badar)	2004	61	—	—	—	—	—	—	—	—	The Little Ginger Club Kid
"Choose Something Like a Star" (featuring Ben Onono)	2004	78	—	—	—	—	—	—	—	—	The Little Ginger Club Kid
"Let the Beats Roll" (featuring Simon Franks)	2007	71	—	—	—	—	—	—	12	—	Non-album single
"Just Won't Do" (with APDW featuring Sam Obernik)	2010	—	—	— (Note: "Just Won't Do" did not enter the Belgian Flemish Ultratop 50 chart, but peaked at number 4 on the Belgian Dance chart.)	—	—	—	—	—	—	Non-album single
"Captain, Captain"	2014	—	—	—	—	—	62	—	—	—	The Radicle
"—" denotes a recording that did not chart or was not released in that territory.

==== With Double 99 ====
Title	Year	Peak chart positions	Album
Title	Year	UK	Album
"RipGroove"	1997	14	7th High

==== With Saffron Hill ====
Title	Year	Peak chart positions			Album
Title	Year	AUS	FIN	NL	Album
"My Love Is Always" (featuring Ben Onono)	2003	42	20	94	Non-album single

==== With Africanism All Stars ====
Title	Year	Peak chart positions	Album
Title	Year	BEL Dance	Album
"Summer Moon"	2005	21	Africanism Vol. 3

=== Production credits ===
Title	Year	Artist	Album
"Come Alive"	2012	Leona Lewis	Non-album single
