= Good Rhymes =

Single by Da Click
- Released: 4 January 1999
- Recorded: 1998
- Genre: UK garage
- Label: FFRR
- Songwriter(s): Bernard Edwards; Nile Rodgers; Christopher Reid; Eugene Nwohia; Paul Gabriel; Ronnie Nwohia; Luther Vandross
- Producer(s): Pied Piper, Unknown MC

Da Click singles chronology
"Good Rhymes" (1999)	"We Are Da Click" (1999)

"Good Rhymes" is the debut single by UK garage group Da Click, released in late 1998. It was produced by DJ Pied Piper, and features rapping from the MCs Creed, PSG and Unknown MC, and singing from Valerie M. A top 20 hit, the song peaked at No. 14 on the UK Singles Chart and No. 2 on the UK Dance Singles Chart in January 1999.

The song interpolates the bassline and chorus of the 1979 Chic hit "Good Times", as well as interpolating vocals from Luther Vandross' "Never Too Much" during PSG's part in the second verse.

== Track listing ==
UK 12" single
A1. "Good Rhymes" (Original Mix) – 5:54
B1. "Good Rhymes" (Blockster Delight Mix) – 6:40
B2. "Baad Rhymes" (Hip Hop (Re) Flex) – 4:16

Australia & New Zealand CD maxi-single (1999, Tinted Records)

1. "Good Rhymes" (Blockster Delight Edit) – 3:37
2. "Good Rhymes" (Original 2 Step Radio Mix) – 3:20
3. "Good Rhymes" (Blockster Delight 12" Mix) – 6:41
4. "Good Rhymes" (NMCB Feel Da Filter Funk 12") – 7:08
5. "Good Rhymes" (Live @ Liberty (Coloseum)) – 5:57
6. "Baad Rhymes" (Hip Hop (Re)Flex) – 4:18

== Charts ==
=== Weekly charts ===
Chart (1999)	Peak position
Europe (Eurochart Hot 100)	57
UK Singles (OCC)	14
UK Dance (OCC)	2
