= Bel Amour =

French electronic music group

- Origin: France
- Genres: House music
- Years active: 2000–present
- Labels: Tommy Boy
- Members: Edouard De Tricasse; Jean-Claude Sindress

Bel Amour is a French electronic music group, specializing in house music, composed of two members: Edouard De Tricasse and Jean-Claude Sindress.

== History ==
The group composed of Edouard de Tricasse and Jean-Claude Sindress, released their debut single, the eponymous "Bel Amour" in 2001. The Tommy Boy single release contained fives mixes of the song, including an instrumental, ranging in length from five to eight minutes. Allmusic's Jason Birchmeier was complimentary of the original radio edit of the song, writing that "though brief, this edit includes all of the song's vocals, making this dancefloor anthem into a succinct dance-pop single." The track was composed by Edouard de Tricasse and the lyrics by Jean-Claude Sindress. It mixes a male vocal with a filtered disco backing, generated buzz at the 2000 Winter Music Conference in Miami Beach, Florida. The single peaked at number 23 in the United Kingdom, and also charted in France and Switzerland in 2001. It entered the Billboard Hot Dance Club Songs chart the following year.

Bel Amour have also remixed for Phats & Small (This Time Around in 2001) and David Guetta (Love Don't Let Me Go in 2002).

In subsequent years, Edouard De Tricasse still performed under the name Bel Amour, Jean-Claude Sindress is a music writer, having written several songs with David Guetta, including Gettin' Over You and Sexy Bitch

== Discography ==
=== Singles ===
Title	Year	Peak chart positions					
Title	Year	FRA	AUS	GER	SWI	UK	US Club
"Bel Amour"	2001	86	139	98	73	23	26
"Promise Me"	2003	—	—	—	—	—	—
"—" denotes a recording that did not chart.
