= Architechs =

UK musical group

- Origin: London, England
- Genres: UK garage
- Years active: 1998–2024
- Label: Go! Beat
- Past members: Paul Akabah (Tre Lowe); Ashley Akabah; K-Warren

Architechs were a UK garage duo which consisted of brothers Paul and Ashley Akabah. They were originally a trio with producer Kevin Williams (K-Warren), who left the group in 1999.

== Biography ==
Architechs gained international attention in 1998 after producing a UK garage remix of Brandy and Monica's "The Boy Is Mine", selling over 40,000 copies of the bootleg.

In 1999, K-Warren left the group to pursue a solo career. Ashley and Paul went on to remix for numerous artists including All Saints, Gabrielle, Faithless, Garbage, Beenie Man, Inaya Day and Jamelia. They collaborated with singer Nana (pronounced "neyney"), who features on both of their commercially successful singles "Body Groove" and "Show Me the Money".

Several of their tracks have featured on the compilation series Pure Garage.

Ashley Akabah died on 2 February 2020 in Notting Hill, West London at the age of 49.

Paul Akabah was a contestant on the 2024 series of the business-themed reality show The Apprentice, and said that he has retired from music as a result of severe tinnitus. He was fired from The Apprentice during the interview stages, after taking part in ten tasks.

== Discography ==
=== Singles ===
| Year | Title | Peak chart positions | | | | | Certifications |
| Year | Title | UK | UK Dance | IRE | NED | SCO | Certifications |
|---|---|---|---|---|---|---|---|
| 25 September 2000 | "Body Groove" (featuring Nana) | 3 | 2 | 42 | 44 | 27 | UK: Platinum |
| 26 March 2001 | "Show Me the Money" | 20 | 9 | — | — | 53 | |
"—" denotes items that did not chart or were not released in that territory.
