= Never Gonna Let You Go (Tina Moore song) =

1995 single by Tina Moore

Single by Tina Moore

from the album Tina Moore
- Released: May 23, 1995
- Genre: R&B; 2-step garage; house
- Length: 4:14
- Label: Street Life; Scotti Bros.; Delirious
- Songwriters: Tina Moore; Tommie Ford
- Producers: Jere MC; M. Doc; Kelly G

Tina Moore singles chronology
"All I Can Do" (1995)	"Never Gonna Let You Go" (1995)	"Nobody Better" (1997)

Music video
- "Never Gonna Let You Go" on YouTube

"Never Gonna Let You Go" is a song by American singer Tina Moore. Originally released as a single in May 1995 from her self-titled debut album, the song reached number 27 on the US Billboard Hot R&B Singles chart. In August 1997, the Kelly G remix, which was included in the original 1995 US release, was re-released on the Delirious label, and became a major hit in the United Kingdom, peaking at number seven on the UK Singles Chart. On the Eurochart Hot 100, it reached number 23 in September 1997. Several remixes are included on the CD and 12-inch formats, such as the Tuff Jam Classic Vocal Mix and Warehouse Junkie Mix.

== Background ==
Kelly G, born Kelly Griffin, was a disc jockey for Chicago radio station WGCI-FM when the opportunity to work with Steve "Silk" Hurley arose. Both Hurley and Griffin made remixes of Tina Moore's "Never Gonna Let You Go" for its original single release in 1995. Ten copies of the single were reported to have been brought to the UK, and the Kelly G remix was then played on December 24, 1995 at the Unity record shop in Soho, London. From there, the song gained traction among British radio stations such as Kiss until its release on the Delirious label, and is often credited as the pioneering 2-step garage song.

== Critical reception ==
Larry Flick from Billboard magazine wrote that Moore "skips and slinks over hand-clapping R&B rhythm with a youthful, thoroughly appealing style." He noted that "there are moments when her fluttering range takes on a tone that is notably close to Mariah Carey", and complimented its "festive sing-along chorus." An editor from Daily Record viewed it as "impressive". Music Week gave it a score of four out of five, adding that "this wailing vocal garage track has been lapped up by Kiss 100 and may cross over in the wake of Rosie Gaines."

James Hyman from the magazine's RM Dance Update gave it five out of five, picking it as Tune of the Week. He noted that it "bounds along with skipping beats, scat prods, deep probing bassline and instantly recognisable Kelly G vocals that hook most effectively when heard in their looped wailing whiney hi-tempo fashion (familiar from Double 99's 'RIP Groove')." He concluded, "Echoing the classic status of tracks such as Jomanda's 'Got A Love For You' and Roberta Flack's 'Uh-uh ooh ooh' and more recently Rosie Gaines' 'Closer Than Close', this will undoubtedly achieve the chart success it deserves." Ian Hyland from Sunday Mirror rated the track eight out of ten. He added, "All the big labels were fighting to get their hands on this dance monster. Top tune in the same mould as chart biggies Ultra Nate and Rosie Gaines. Watch it fly."

== Music video ==
A music video was produced to promote the single, directed by Daniel Zirilli.

== Impact and legacy ==
DJ Magazine ranked it number 62 in their list of the "Top 100 Club Tunes" in 1998. MTV Dance placed "Never Gonna Let You Go" at number 92 in their list of "The 100 Biggest 90's Dance Anthems of All Time" in November 2011. Porcys listed the song at number 54 in their ranking of "100 Singles 1990-1999" in 2012. In November 2016, UK duo Gorgon City compiled a list of their top UK garage songs for Billboard, with "Never Gonna Let You Go" at number 9. The Guardian ranked the song at number 11 in their list of "The best UK garage tracks - ranked!" in 2019. They wrote:

An early sign of UK garage’s chart appeal, this track by a minor US R&B singer was transformed into a club smash and a mainstream hit by the application of a monster bassline and the kind of skipping beat that would come to be known as two-step. This B-side remix – by Kelly G, an acolyte of Chicago house legend Steve "Silk" Hurley – became an A-side two years on.

Redbull.com included the song in their list of "10 underground UK garage classics that still sound fresh today". Capital Xtra included the song in their list of "The Best Old-School Garage Anthems of All Time".

== Track listing ==
- US CD maxi-single (1995)
1. "Never Gonna Let You Go" (LP Mix) (4:15)
2. "Never Gonna Let You Go" (Silk's King of Clubs 7-inch) (4:30)
3. "Never Gonna Let You Go" (Torin's Anthem 7-inch) (3:37)
4. "Never Gonna Let You Go" (Late Night Soul 7-inch) (3:57)
5. "Never Gonna Let You Go" (Warehouse Junkie mix) (5:55)
6. "Never Gonna Let You Go" (Kelly G Bump-N-Go mix) (4:15)
7. "Never Gonna Let You Go" (Indasoul Mix radio edit) (3:47)
- UK CD maxi-single (1997)
1. "Never Gonna Let You Go" (Kelly G Bump-N-Go vocal mix) (4:12)
2. "Never Gonna Let You Go" (Kelly G Bump-N-Go dub edit) (3:55)
3. "Never Gonna Let You Go" (Tuff Jam classic vocal mix) (5:13)
4. "Never Gonna Let You Go" (Tuff Jam UVM dub) (6:27)
5. "Never Gonna Let You Go" (Warehouse Junkie mix) (5:55)
6. "Never Gonna Let You Go" (LP mix) (4:14)

== Charts ==
=== Weekly charts ===
==== Original version (1995) ====
Chart (1995)	Peak position
US Hot R&B Singles (Billboard)	27
US Maxi-Singles Sales (Billboard)	36

==== Kelly G remix (1997) ====
Chart (1997)	Peak position
Europe (Eurochart Hot 100)	23
Israel (Israeli Singles Chart)	15
Scottish Singles Sales (Official Charts)	34
UK Singles (Official Charts)	7
UK Dance (Official Charts)	1
UK Hip Hop/R&B (Official Charts)	1

=== Year-end charts ===
Chart (1997)	Position
UK Singles (OCC)	42

== Certifications ==
Region	Certification	Certified units/sales
United Kingdom (BPI)	Platinum	300,000^{‡}
^{‡} Sales+streaming figures based on certification alone.

== Release history ==
Region	Date	Format(s)	Label(s)	Ref.
United States	May 23, 1995	Rhythmic contemporary radio	Street Life; Scotti Bros.	
United Kingdom	August 18, 1997	12-inch vinyl; CD; cassette	Delirious	
