= Body Groove =

2000 single by Architechs

Single by Architechs featuring Nana
- Released: 25 September 2000
- Genre: UK garage
- Length: 5:13
- Label: Go! Beat
- Songwriters: Ashley Akabah; Paul Akabah
- Producer: Architechs

Architechs singles chronology
"Body Groove" (2000)	"Show Me the Money" (2001)

"Body Groove" is a song by UK garage group Architechs, featuring vocals from Nana. Released as their debut single on 25 September 2000, it was a success, peaking at number three on the UK Singles Chart and becoming a moderate hit in Belgium, Iceland, and the Netherlands.

== Background ==
In an interview with Sound on Sound, Ashley and Paul Akabah explained that much of the track was created in a modest home setup, with producer City programming the beats on an Akai S3000 sampler and recording vocals from Nana in their South London studio.

== Critical reception ==
Music Week praised the single as a "standout UKG crossover", singling out Nana’s vocal as "the element that lifts it beyond the clubs". In Sound on Sound, the production was described as a model of "how little more than an Akai sampler and strong songwriting instincts could deliver a UK Top 5 hit". The Guardian ranked "Body Groove" amongst the best UK garage tracks of all time, calling it "a ridiculously catchy, squelchy tune" that embodied the genre's commercial peak. Resident Advisor wrote that "Body Groove" had become "a time capsule for the optimism of 2000 UKG, still a guaranteed singalong nearly two decades later".

== Track listings ==
UK CD and 12-inch single; European CD single

1. "Body Groove" (original mix MC version) – 5:13
2. "Body Groove" (Drive Time mix) – 5:35
3. "Body Groove" (Zed Bias dub mix) – 5:52

UK cassette single

1. "Body Groove" (original mix MC version) – 5:13
2. "Body Groove" (Zed Bias dub mix) – 5:52

== Charts ==
=== Weekly charts ===
Chart (2000)	Peak position
Belgium (Ultratip Bubbling Under Flanders)	15
Belgium (Ultratip Bubbling Under Wallonia)	9
Europe (Eurochart Hot 100)	16
Iceland (Íslenski Listinn Topp 40)	21
Netherlands (Dutch Top 40)	26
Netherlands (Single Top 100)	44
Scottish Singles Sales (Official Charts)	27
UK Singles (Official Charts)	3
UK Dance (Official Charts)	2

=== Year-end charts ===
Chart (2000)	Position
UK Singles (OCC)	56

== Certifications ==
Region	Certification	Certified units/sales
United Kingdom (BPI)	Platinum	600,000^{‡}
^{‡} Sales+streaming figures based on certification alone.

== Covers and samples ==
In 2019, DJ Spoony together with Katie Chatburn and the Ignition Orchestra featuring Nay Nay and Ms Banks on vocals recorded an orchestral version of the song for the UK garage covers album Garage Classical. In 2020, Dizzee Rascal sampled the intro of "Body Groove" throughout his song "Body Loose".
