= It Just Won't Do =

2002 single by Tim Deluxe

Single by Tim Deluxe featuring Sam Obernik
- B-side: "We All Love Sax"
- Released: 8 July 2002
- Genre: House
- Length: 5:11 (album version); 3:21 (radio edit)
- Label: Underwater
- Songwriters: Tim Deluxe; Ben Onono
- Producer: Tim Deluxe

Tim Deluxe singles chronology
| "Sirens" (2001) | "It Just Won't Do" (2002) | "Less Talk More Action!" (2003) |

Audio
- "It Just Won't Do" on YouTube

"It Just Won't Do" is a song by English DJ and producer Tim Deluxe, featuring English singer Sam Obernik on vocals. The track, a Latin-inspired house song, was written and produced by Tim Deluxe and co-written by Ben Onono. The song contains a prominent trumpet riff performed by Simon Finch. Following exposure at the Winter Music Conference in Miami, Florida, the song gained popularity in dance clubs and was eventually released as a standalone single through Underwater Records on 8 July 2002. The song was later included on Tim Deluxe's debut studio album, The Little Ginger Club Kid, in 2004.

"It Just Won't Do" became Deluxe's and Obernik's highest-charting single in the UK, peaking at number 14 on the UK Singles Chart. In Europe, it became a top-10 hit in Hungary, the Netherlands, and Spain, and it topped the European Dance Traxx chart for 14 weeks, tying the record for the longest stay at number one on this ranking. In Australia, the track reached number 13 and was certified gold by the Australian Recording Industry Association (ARIA). The song was nominated for two awards: Track of the Season at the 2002 DJ Awards and the Ivors Dance Award in 2003, winning the former accolade.

== Critical reception ==
Reviewing the song in June 2002, British trade paper Music Week noted the song's "sledgehammer bassline" and its "fiery vocal and trumpet line". In his weekly UK chart commentary, James Masterton called "It Just Won't Do" a "proper" dance song but dismissed its commercial appeal. In a review for The Little Ginger Club Kid, Jason Birchmeier of AllMusic labelled the track "killer". In 2002, Tim Deluxe won the DJ Award for Track of the Season for this song, and the following year, it was nominated for the Ivors Dance Award, losing to "Lazy" by X-Press 2.

== Commercial performance ==
In the United Kingdom, "It Just Won't Do" became a mainstay on radio throughout mid-2002. Following its physical release, it debuted and peaked at number 14 on the UK Singles Chart, becoming Tim Deluxe's only top-40 UK hit and Sam Obernik's first. The single spent seven weeks in the top 100, giving both musicians their longest-charting hit. In Ireland, the song peaked at number 26 on the Irish Singles Chart and remained in the top 30 for three weeks. It became a top-10 hit in the Netherlands and Spain, peaking at number six on the Dutch Top 40, number 10 on the Dutch Single Top 100, and number seven on Spain's Promusicae chart. According to the Dutch Top 40, it was the Netherlands' 52nd-most-successful single of 2002.

Across the rest of Europe, "It Just Won't Do" entered the top 20 in the Flanders region of Belgium and appeared within the lower reaches of the charts in France, Germany, and Switzerland. It became a significant dance hit, topping Music & Media's Dance Traxx chart for 14 weeks and tying the record for the most weeks spent at number one on this ranking, along with Roger Sanchez's "Another Chance". On the Eurochart Hot 100, the single reached number 55 in late July. In 2006, the track charted in Hungary, peaking at number eight on the Single Top 40. It also found success in Australia, where it peaked at number 13 on the ARIA Singles Chart, topped the ARIA Club Chart, and earned a gold certification for shipping over 35,000 copies in Australia alone. In September 2003, the song appeared on the US Billboard Dance Radio Airplay chart for a single week, at number 39.

== Track listings ==
UK CD and cassette single

1. "It Just Won't Do" (radio edit)
2. "It Just Won't Do" (club)
3. "We All Love Sax"

UK 12-inch single

A1. "It Just Won't Do" (club mix)
A2. "It Just Won't Do" (percussion loop tool)
B1. "It Just Won't Do" (dub mix)
B2. "It Just Won't Do" (full loop tool)
B3. "It Just Won't Do" (bass loop tool)

Belgian CD single

1. "It Just Won't Do" (radio edit)
2. "It Just Won't Do" (club mix)

Dutch and Australian CD single

1. "It Just Won't Do" (radio edit)
2. "It Just Won't Do" (club mix)
3. "It Just Won't Do" (dub mix)
4. "We All Love Sax"

Spanish 12-inch single

A1. "It Just Won't Do" (club mix) – 6:59
AA1. "It Just Won't Do" (dub mix) – 6:09
AA2. "We All Love Sax" – 4:50

== Credits and personnel ==
Credits are lifted from the UK CD single liner notes.

Studio

- Produced at The Deluxe Room

Personnel

- Tim Deluxe – writing, production
- Ben Onono – writing
- Sam Obernik – vocals
- Fraser T. Smith – guitar
- Simon Finch – trumpet
- Jamie Anderson – saxophone ("We All Love Sax")

== Charts ==
=== Weekly charts ===
| Chart (2002) | Peak position |
|---|---|
| Australia (ARIA) | 13 |
| Australian Club Chart (ARIA) | 1 |
| Australian Dance (ARIA) | 2 |
| Belgium (Ultratop 50 Flanders) | 18 |
| Belgium (Ultratip Bubbling Under Wallonia) | 2 |
| Europe (Eurochart Hot 100) | 55 |
| European Dance Traxx (Music & Media) | 1 |
| France (SNEP) | 60 |
| Germany (GfK) | 77 |
| Ireland (IRMA) | 26 |
| Netherlands (Dutch Top 40) | 6 |
| Netherlands (Single Top 100) | 10 |
| Scotland Singles (Official Charts) | 13 |
| Spain (Promusicae) | 7 |
| Switzerland (Schweizer Hitparade) | 57 |
| UK Singles (Official Charts) | 14 |
| UK Dance (Official Charts) | 1 |
| UK Indie (Official Charts) | 2 |
| US Dance/Mix Show Airplay (Billboard) | 39 |

| Chart (2006) | Peak position |
|---|---|
| Hungary (Single Top 40) | 8 |

=== Year-end charts ===
| Chart (2002) | Position |
|---|---|
| Australia (ARIA) | 90 |
| Australian Club Chart (ARIA) | 2 |
| Australian Dance (ARIA) | 14 |
| Netherlands (Dutch Top 40) | 52 |

== Certifications ==
| Region | Certification | Certified units/sales |
|---|---|---|
| Australia (ARIA) | Gold | 35,000^{^} |
^{^} Shipments figures based on certification alone.

== Release history ==
| Region | Date | Format(s) | Label(s) | Ref. |
|---|---|---|---|---|
| United Kingdom | 8 July 2002 | 12-inch vinyl; CD; cassette | Underwater | |
| Australia | 26 August 2002 | CD | Universal Dance | |
| New Zealand | 7 October 2002 | CD | Universal New Zealand | |
