= Kevin L. Evans =

- Born: 22 February 1962 (age 64); Verdun, France
- Origin: Los Angeles, California
- Occupations: Music executive, songwriter, executive producer, producer
- Years active: 1987–present
- Labels: RCA Records, All American Communications, A&M Records
- Website: 7thagency.com

Kevin Lamar Evans (born February 22, 1962) is an entertainment executive. Evans was Senior Vice President/Head of Urban Music Division at RCA Records; President, Urban Music Division at All American Communications; and Head of Gospel and Urban Music A&R at A&M Records.

== Life and career ==
Evans attended Georgia State University in Atlanta, where he majored in Communications. He also attended Columbia School of Broadcasting.

Evans signed artists such as Tyrese, Angie Stone, Rome, Kevon Edmonds, Freddie Jackson and Chantay Savage.

Evans held executive positions at RCA, A&M, Scotti Brothers/All American And Light Records, where he was an A&R executive overseeing artists such as Janet Jackson, Barry White, James Brown, Amy Grant, 'N Sync, Robyn, SWV, Shirley Caesar, James Cleveland, Yolanda Adams, Commissioned, Fred Hammond, Beau Williams, and Douglas Miller. During his tenure at A&M, Evans produced the "If I Could Be Like Mike" Gatorade jingle starring Michael Jordan.

=== Accomplishments ===
Evans is responsible for A&R, signing, and executive producing artists who have sold over 80 million records worldwide. He has received numerous awards and recognitions, including Impact Music Executive of the Year in 1997 and Gavin Magazine's Urban Music Executive of the Year in 1998.

Evans co-wrote the chart-topping single titled "Hold On", which was originally released on Yolanda Adams 2007 holiday album "What a Wonderful Time". The song was then released on Hidden Beach Recordings' 2008 compilation inspired by Barack Obama's groundbreaking presidential campaign titled "Yes We Can: Voices of a Grassroots Movement". The song was also featured on the WOW Gospel 2008 compilation series distributed through Verity/Jive/Sony and the EMI Music Christian Music Group. This album was certified Gold in the US in 2008 by the Recording Industry Association of America (RIAA).

=== Discography – R & B, pop, rap and jazz ===
- Tyrese – signed, A&R, executive producer
- Barry White – A&R
- James Brown – A&R
- Kevon Edmonds – signed, A&R, executive producer
- Angie Stone – signed, A&R, executive producer
- Freddie Jackson – signed, A&R, executive producer
- SWV – A&R, executive producer
- Amy Grant – A&R/Remix
- N' Sync – A&R/Remix
- Aaron Neville – A&R/Remix
- Janet Jackson – A&R/Remix
- Yolanda Adams – A&R, executive producer
- Herb Alpert – A&R/Remix
- Michael Jordan (Gatorade "If I Could Be Like Mike") — A&R, producer, executive producer
- Waiting To Exhale – Soundtrack – A&R the song ("All Night Long" Featuring SWV)
- Men In Black – Soundtrack – A&R the song ("Men In Black" Featuring COCO of SWV)
- Chantay Savage – A&R, executive producer
- Rome – signed, A&R, executive producer
- Vesta – A&R
- Robyn – A&R
- Christopher Williams — A&R
- Tina Moore- signed, A&R, executive producer
- Vertical Hold- signed, A&R, executive producer
- Geral Alston, signed, A&R, executive producer
- Silk E. Fyne- signed, A&R, executive producer
- Skeelo- A&R
- 12 Gauge- signed, A&R, executive producer
- Dina Carroll- A&R
- Vanessa Rubin- A&R, executive producer
- Rodney Mansfield- A&R, executive producer
- Bad Boyz of the Industry- signed, A&R, executive producer
- Nikki Kixx- signed, A&R, executive producer
- Sweet Sable- signed, A&R, executive producer
- Elusion- signed, A&R, executive producer
- Alfonso Blackwell- signed, A&R, executive producer
- Varnell Brown- A&R
- Erika Yancey- A&R, executive producer
- Tami- signed, A&R, executive producer
- Shiro- A&R
- Creo D- signed, A&R, executive producer
- Gold Teet- signed, A&R, executive producer
- E.O.L.- signed, A&R, executive producer
- Jennifer Brown- A&R

=== Discography (gospel) ===
- Shirley Caesar – A&M / Word
- James Cleveland – Executive Producer, A&M / C.G.I
- Winans – Light Records
- Andre Crouch – Light Records
- Edwin Hawkins –Light Records
- Termaine Hawkins – A&M
- Commissioned – A&M / Benson / Light Records
- Yolanda Adams – A&R / Executive Producer
- Darryl Coley – Light Records
- Fred Hammond – A&M / Benson
- Vicki Winans – Light Records
- Dorothy Norwood – A&M
- Thomas Whitfield – A&M / Benson
- Helen Baylor – A&M / Word
- Milton Brunson – A&M / Word
- Douglas Miller – Executive Producer, A&M / C.G.I.
- Beau Williams – Light Records- Manager
- Richard Smallwood – A&M / Word
- Pops Staples – A&M / I AM
- Hawkins Family – Light Records
- Sandra Crouch – Light Records
- Melvin Williams – Light Records
- Dawkins & Dawkins – A&M / Benson
- Olanda Draper – A&M / Word
- Dannibelle Hall – Executive Producer A&M / C.G.I.
- Veronica & Angela – A&M / Benson
- L.A. Mass Choir – Light Records – Manager
- Kim McFarland – A&M / C.G.I.
- Patrick Henderson – A&M / Benson
- Soul Children of Chicago – A&M / Benson
- Donald Malloy – Executive Producer A&M / C.G.I.
- Chicago Mass Choir – Executive Producer A&M / C.G.I.
- Allen & Allen – Executive Producer A&M / C.G.I.
- Billy & Sarah Gaines – A&M / Benson
- Kingdom – A&M / Benson
- Arthur Scales – A&M / I AM
- Futrell – Light Records
- Rod McGaughy – A&M / I AM
- Edification – Executive Producer A&M
- Evelyn Agee – Executive Producer A&M / C.G.I
- iNDIGO – Distributing Label Executive Producer
- Nicole "Faithful" Franklin -Distributing Label Executive Producer
- Al Mac Will -A&R / Distributing Label Executive Producer

== Personal life ==
Evans was engaged to film actress Pam Grier in 1998. He has four children from previous relationships.
