= Wookie (musician) =

- Also known as: Wookie; Exemen
- Born: Jason Chue; 27 July 1972 (age 53)
- Origin: London, England
- Genres: UK garage; house
- Occupations: Record producer; remixer; DJ; musician
- Years active: 1991–present
- Labels: S2S Recordings; Manchu Recordings

Jason Chue (born 27 July 1972), better known as Wookie, is a UK garage musician. He scored a UK top 10 hit in 2000 with his song "Battle".

== Biography ==
Chue's career began in 1991 as a producer for UK R&B/reggae artist Wayne Marshall, producing most of Marshall's debut album 90 Degrees and Rising in 1994. Shortly after, Chue became writer/producer for Soul II Soul at their studio, working with Jazzie B for several years. He would also go on to produce for Dynamite MC and Doom Man.

Chue has remixed tracks by Destiny's Child, Public Enemy and Nas, among others. In the late 1990s, the 'Wookie sound' became apparent in his bootleg mixes of songs by Whitney Houston, Brandy and Debelah Morgan.

One of the original innovators of UK garage, Wookie scored a huge underground club hit in 1999 with "Scrappy". Also in that year, he released his first official remix of the Gabrielle song "Sunshine", under the name 'Wookie'. Another hit remix was released in 2000 under the alias Exemen, of Sia's song "Little Man". Wookie scored his first UK top 10 hit single in 2000 with "Battle". Two of his other songs, "What's Going On" and "Back Up (To Me)" also made the UK charts. His self-titled debut album was also released in 2000.

Wookie has reproduced tracks for artists such as Jessie J, Rizzle Kicks, Sia, Justin Timberlake, Roll Deep, Ray Foxx, and many others.

In 2013, Wookie appeared alongside many other garage pioneers in a documentary exploring the legacy of UK garage, Rewind 4Ever: The History of UK Garage. Also in 2013, Wookie produced remixes of Disclosure's "Voices" and Eliza Doolittle's "Walking on Water". On 31 December 2013, Wookie together with Zed Bias headlined the Bruk Out party at the Big Chill House in Kings Cross, London.

== Discography ==
=== Albums ===
- 2000: Wookie

=== Singles ===
- 1999: "Down on Me"/"Scrappy"
- 2000: "What's Going On" – UK No. 45
- 2000: "Battle" – UK No. 10
- 2000: "Get Enuff" (featuring Lain) – UK No. 80
- 2001: "Back Up (To Me)" (featuring Lain) – UK No. 38
- 2006: "Sunshine in the Rain" (featuring Lain)
- 2006: "Live On"
- 2007: "Do You Believe?" (featuring Xavier)
- 2008: "Falling Again"/"Gallium" (featuring NY)
- 2012: "2 Us" (with Rachel Collier)
- 2013: "The Hype" (featuring Eliza Doolittle)
- 2014: "Higher" (featuring Zak Abel)

=== Remixes ===
- 2000: "Sunshine" (Wookie main mix) – Gabrielle
- 2000: "Little Man" (Exemen remix) – Sia
- 2006: "Lean wit It, Rock wit It" (Exemen master mix) – Dem Franchize Boyz
- 2012: "Sparks" (Wookie remix) – Cover Drive
- 2020: "Who Knew?" (Wookie remix) – Disclosure and Mick Jenkins

== Awards ==
- MOBO nomination for Best Producer
- Ericsson Award winner for Best Newcomer
