= Brian Harvey =

English singer (born 1974)

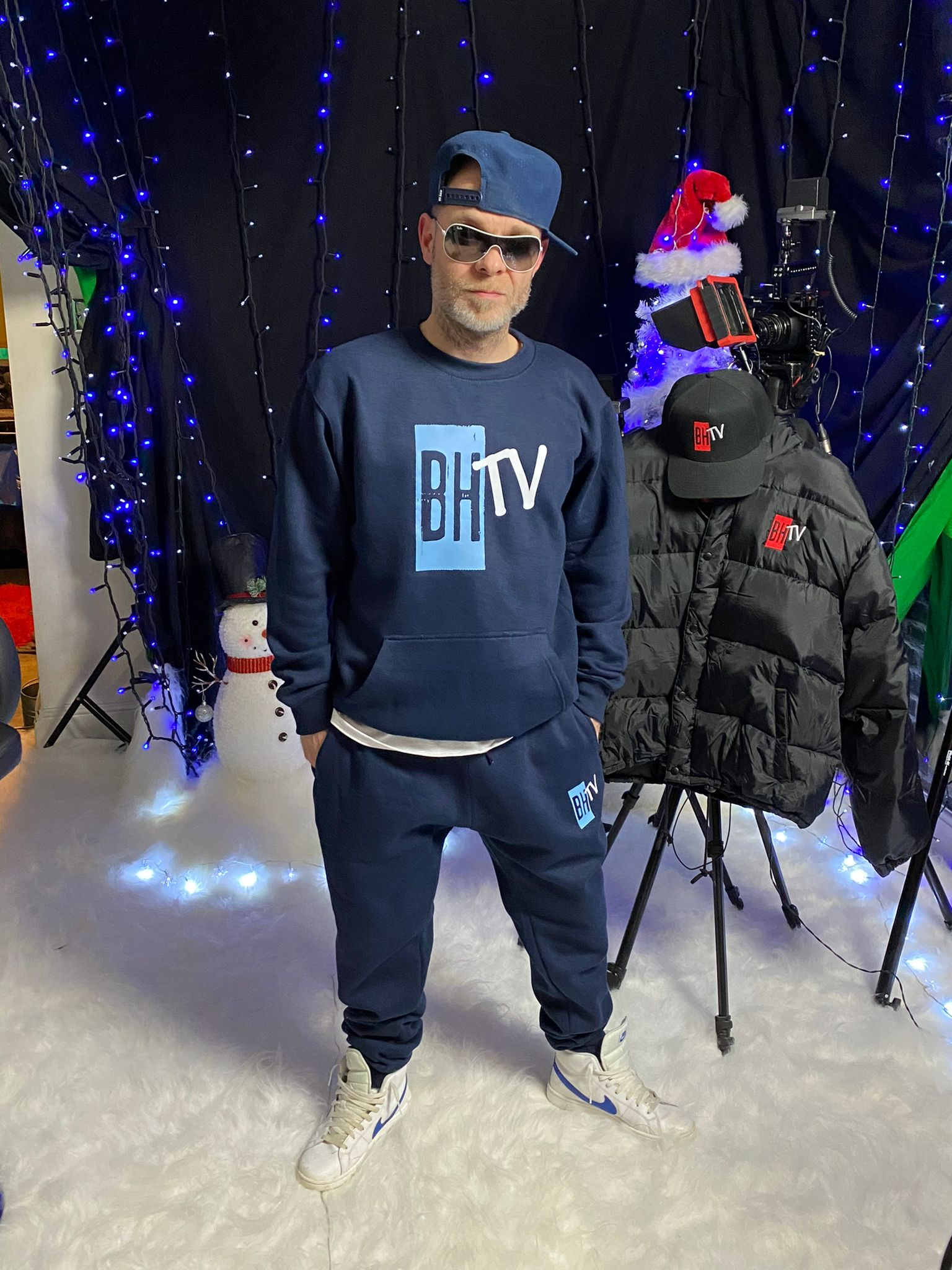
- Harvey in 2021

Background information
- Born: Brian Lee Harvey; 8 August 1974 (age 52)
- Origin: London, England
- Genres: Pop; R&B
- Occupation: Singer
- Years active: 1991–present
- Label: Edel
- Formerly of: East 17
- Website: bhtv.uk

Brian Lee Harvey (born 8 August 1974) is an English singer from London. He was the lead vocalist of the pop boy band East 17. The later incarnation of the band, E-17, had two top 20 singles on the UK singles chart between 1998 and 1999, with their fourth studio album Resurrection peaking within the top 50 of the UK Albums Chart. After leaving E-17, Harvey signed a recording contract with Edel Records and had two singles released in 2001, "Straight Up (No Bends)" and "Loving You (Ole Ole Ole)".

== Career ==
Harvey's vocal style emulated R&B and new jack swing vocalists from the United States. His vocals put him into a position of the group's frontman, or main member, which was shared with the group's creator, songwriter, instrumentalist, rapper and singer Tony Mortimer.

In 1997, Harvey was sacked from East 17 after making comments in a radio interview that appeared to condone the use of the drug ecstasy, in which he claimed to have taken 12 pills in one night, causing an uproar in the press and the matter being raised by Member of Parliament Barry Legg during Prime Minister's Questions. Mortimer left East 17 several months later. Harvey eventually rejoined the group under the rebranded name of E-17. As E-17, the group had two top 20 singles on the UK Singles Chart between 1998 and 1999, with the album Resurrection reaching the UK Top 50.

In 2000, Harvey collaborated with True Steppers with the song "True Step Tonight" featuring Donell Jones, which peaked at number 26 on the UK Singles Chart.

After E-17, he signed a record deal with Edel Records and had two singles released in 2001, "Straight Up (No Bends)" (No. 26 UK) and "Loving You (Ole Ole Ole)" (No. 20 UK).

In 2004, Harvey appeared in the fourth series of I'm A Celebrity...Get Me Out Of Here! Harvey left the show after six days.

On 17 March 2007, Harvey performed a song entitled "I Can" for Making Your Mind Up, the United Kingdom's national final for the Eurovision Song Contest. The song was written by singer Conner Reeves. Harvey was eliminated after the first round of voting and the eventual winners were Scooch.

In 2014, he released a new single, "Invisible".

In 2019, he was making music with rapper Cryptik Soul. He was featured in the song "A Ghetto Luv Story" on Cryptik Soul's album Killer's Blood. The album was supported by the singles "Come & Save Me" and "Bang 'Em Up" which also featured Harvey.

== Personal life ==
In the 1990s, Harvey had a relationship with actress Danniella Westbrook. Harvey was married to dancer Natasha Carnegie with whom he has a daughter.

On 12 December 2001, Harvey was attacked with a knife in a club car park in Nottingham. In May 2005, after being diagnosed with clinical depression, Harvey was hospitalised after an alleged suicide attempt. On 31 May 2005, he was re-admitted to hospital in a critical condition after falling under the wheels of his own car. In an interview with GMTV, Harvey described reversing his Mercedes-Benz and suddenly feeling sick as the result of eating too many jacket potatoes, and after opening the door to vomit he accidentally stepped on the accelerator pedal instead of the brake, which resulted in him being thrown under the moving car and running over himself.

In March 2019, Harvey was arrested and later released by Metropolitan Police at his home after he made comments about "threatening to self-harm" on a live YouTube video.

== Discography ==
=== Studio albums ===
==== East 17 ====
- 1992 – Walthamstow
- 1994 – Steam
- 1995 – Up All Night

==== E-17 ====
- 1998 – Resurrection

==== Solo ====
- 2001: Solo

=== Singles ===
- 2000: "True Step Tonight" (True Steppers featuring Brian Harvey and Donell Jones) – No. 25 UK
- 2001: "Straight Up (No Bends)" – No. 26 UK
- 2001: "Loving You (Ole Ole Ole)" (Brian Harvey and The Refugee Crew) – No. 20 UK
- 2002: "Senorita"
- 2007: "I Can"
- 2010: "Going Backwardz"
- 2019: "Come & Save Me" (Cryptik Soul featuring Brian Harvey and Shotti)
- 2019: "Bang 'Em Up" (Cryptik Soul featuring The Styles Of L, Kryptic and Brian Harvey)
- 2023: "Imitation Love" (Rocket Dubz featuring Brian Harvey)
- 2024: "NyteRidaz" (Cryptik Soul featuring Shotti and Brian Harvey)
