= Tina Moore =

American R&B musician (born 1970)

- Born: 17 October 1970 (age 55); Racine, Wisconsin, U.S.
- Genres: R&B, 2-step
- Occupations: Singer, songwriter
- Instrument: Vocals
- Labels: RCA, Scotti Brothers Records

Tina Moore (born October 17, 1970, in Racine, Wisconsin) is an American R&B musician. She scored two top 20 hit singles in the United Kingdom in 1997 with "Never Gonna Let You Go" (#7) and "Nobody Better" (#20). Both singles are UK garage remixes of songs from her 1995 album Tina Moore.

== Discography ==
=== Studio albums ===
Year	Album	Peak positions
Year	Album	US R&B
1995	Tina Moore	90
2000	All in My Vibe	91
2002	Time Will Tell	—

=== Singles ===
Year	Single	Peak positions		Certifications	Album
Year	Single	US R&B	UK	Certifications	Album
1994	"Color Me Blue"	73	—		Tina Moore
1995	"All I Can Do"	48	—		Tina Moore
1995	"Never Gonna Let You Go"	27	—		Tina Moore
1997	"Never Gonna Let You Go" (Remix)	—	7	BPI: Platinum	Tina Moore
1997	"Nobody Better"	—	20		Tina Moore
"—" denotes releases that did not chart or were not released in that territory.
