= UK garage =

Genre of electronic dance music

- Stylistic origins: Garage house; jungle; breakbeat; R&B; dancehall; dance-pop
- Cultural origins: Early to mid-1990s, London, England

Subgenres
- Speed garage; 2-step garage; Breakstep; Future garage; NUKG

Fusion genres
- Dubstep; Bassline; Grime; UK funky

Other topics
- Bass music; Future bass; House; Drum and bass

UK garage, abbreviated as UKG, is a genre of electronic music which originated in England in the early to mid-1990s. It is defined by percussive, shuffled rhythms with syncopated hi-hats, cymbals, and snares, and may include either 4/4 house kick patterns or more irregular "2-step" rhythms. Garage tracks also commonly feature "chopped up" and time-stretched or pitch-shifted vocal samples complementing the underlying rhythmic structure at a tempo usually around 130 BPM. The genre was influenced by garage house, jungle, Jamaican soundsystem, ragga, dancehall, gospel music, R&B, and rave culture.

UK garage encompassed subgenres such as speed garage and 2-step, and was then largely subsumed into other styles of music and production in the mid-2000s, including bassline, grime, and dubstep. The decline of UK garage during the mid-2000s saw the birth of UK funky, which is closely related. The 2010s saw a resurgence in the genre through underground and leftfield club music particularly as an influence on what became known as "post dubstep", then in the early 2020s, a major populist revival of UK garage, sometimes titled "new UK garage" or "NUKG".

== Origins ==
UK garage emerged in London in the early 1990s from a blend of New York garage house, jungle, Jamaican ragga and dancehall music, and R&B. It was influenced by the pirate radio scene, rave culture, gospel, Baptist churches, and the Black diaspora. MJ Cole once stated, "London is a multicultural city... it's like a melting pot of young people, and that's reflected in the music of UK garage."

In the United Kingdom, where jungle was very popular at the time, US or US-influenced house and garage was very often played in a second room at jungle events. DJs would often favour the instrumentals or dub mixes on 12" singles, in which vocals would be stripped out but for small sections intricately cut up using sampler technology. Sarah Lockhart, a key A&R for the garage scene and later founder of the FWD>> club night noted the popularity of Hardrive's "Deep Inside" at such events in 1993 as a tipping point for garage attracting people away from more hardcore sounds.

After jungle's peak in cultural significance, it turned towards a harsher, more techstep influenced sound, driving away dancers, predominantly women. Escaping the 170bpm jungle basslines, the garage rooms provided a more sensual and soulful sound at 130bpm.

Garage increasingly got aired at events on a Sunday, such an event at the nearby Frog & Nightgown. This gave rise to what became known as the Sunday Scene. This was partly because garage parties were treated as somewhere for people who had been dancing to harder sounds all weekend to carry on: Sarah Lockhart described the Frog & Nightgown as such, characterising it as a place where die-hard clubbers who had been going all weekend ended up Also, initially speed and UK garage promoters could only hire venues on Sunday evenings (Friday and Saturday nights were still the preserve of faster and then more popular jungle and drum and bass events). Larger nightclubs, such as Heaven in Charing Cross, then began to dedicate space to garage DJs.

Early promoters of a UK garage sound included DJ EZ, Dreem Teem and Tuff Jam, and pirate radio stations such as London Underground, Magic FM, Upfront FM, and Freek FM.

An early UK garage track, "Feel My Love" by Justin Cantor and Matt Jam Lamont, was recorded in 1991. It wouldn't be officially released until 1993. Tracks that had been big on the breakbeat hardcore rave scene such as We Are I.E. also started to feature in garage sets, sped up.

=== 1994–1997: Speed garage ===
In 1994, DJ EZ started working at Freek FM. That same year, while DJing in a Greenwich nightclub, he played American DJ Todd Edwards' garage house track "The Praise (God in His Hand)" at a speedier 130 beats-per-minute (bpm), instead of the 120bpm popular in the US, to make it closer to the tempo of the UK hardcore and jungle music popular in clubs at the time. This raised the visibility of garage house which, when played at 130bpm, became known as speed garage.

Speed garage tracks were characterised by a sped-up house-style beat, complemented by the rolling snares and reverse-warped basslines that were popular with drum and bass producers of the time. Speed garage already incorporated many aspects of today's UK garage sound like sub-bass lines, ragga vocals, spin backs, and reversed drums.

Armand van Helden's speed garage remix of Sneaker Pimps' "Spin Spin Sugar" in 1997 further popularised the genre and is sometimes credited with breaking speed garage into the mainstream.

Edwards' distinctive sampling style, with chopped up vocals and complex rhythms, would continue to influence this emerging genre. Instead of having full verses and choruses, Edwards picked out vocal phrases and played them like an instrument. Often, individual syllables were reversed or pitch-shifted.

As British producers working in this genre began to create their own original tracks—incorporating elements of Black-British Caribbean, Caribbean, and rave music—they increasingly called their work "UK garage". The new genre became especially popular on pirate radio stations.

Over the course of the 1990s, new garage clubs opened across the UK, with large scenes in Birmingham, Manchester, Bristol, and other university towns. By 1996, the UK garage scene had spread to popular tourist destinations in Ayia Napa, Ibiza and Faliraki.

Speed garage duo Industry Standard scored a top 40 hit with "Vol. 1 (What You Want What You Need)" peaking at #34 in January 1998, and the 1997 XL Recordings release of Somore featuring Damon Trueitt's "I Refuse (What You Want)" reached #21 also in January 1998, containing mixes by Industry Standard, Ramsey & Fen, R.I.P. Productions and Serious Danger. Serious Danger obtained a chart hit in his own right with "Deeper" which debuted and peaked at #40 in December 1997, and the Fabulous Baker Boys scored a chart hit with "Oh Boy", which peaked at #34 in November 1997 and samples Jonny L's 1992 rave track "Hurt You So".

=== 1998–2001: 2-step garage and UK chart success ===
Over time, the 2-step garage sound emerged with the addition of further funky elements like contemporary R&B-styled vocals, more shuffled beats, and a different drum pattern. The most radical change from speed garage to 2-step was the removal of the second and fourth kick drum from each bar and the shifting of the third kick, originally showing influence from hip hop, street soul and Soul II Soul, but quickly also using kick-drum patterns from dancehall, reggae and Latin styles too: producer El-B says "we used to call it the conga rhythm, a tribal rhythm - I guess it was a reggae beat, a bashment beat really".

One of the earliest examples that brought 2-step into the speed garage scene is the Kelly G "Bump-N-Go Vocal Edit" and "Dub" remixes of "Never Gonna Let You Go" by Tina Moore, originally released in May 1995. The UK garage DJ, producer and record shop mainstay Stephen "Noodles" Jude recalls London DJs belatedly discovering the mix at Christmas of 1995 and says that particular moment altered the course of the scene. The mixes, played significantly sped up by DJs, made Moore’s song an enduring anthem for the UK garage scene. It was eventually re-released with the Kelly G versions as the lead tracks, and peaked at #7 on the UK chart that month.

In 1998, Lovestation released their version of "Teardrops" which reached #14. Doolally (later known as Shanks & Bigfoot) also scored a #20 hit the same year with "Straight from the Heart". A re-release of this song the following year fared even better, peaking at #9, due to the success of their #1 single "Sweet Like Chocolate".

With the continued support of pirate radio stations such as Rinse FM, Ice FM, Déjà Vu, and Flex FM, the soaring popularity of UK garage saw 1999 take the genre into the mainstream, breaking into the music charts. Venues such as Scala, The Colosseum, The Gass Club, Ministry of Sound and Fabric became especially associated with garage. Besides being popular in UK clubs, venues in Aiya Napa and Ibiza were also dedicated to garage.

Production duos Shanks & Bigfoot and Artful Dodger were very successful with the tracks "Sweet Like Chocolate" (the first UK garage track to hit number one in the UK) and "Re-Rewind", respectively. Both songs reached platinum status and became anthems for the 2-step garage scene. Other huge hits in 1999 include the #1 house/garage anthem "You Don't Know Me" by Armand van Helden.

Da Click (Pied Piper, MC Creed, PSG, Unknown MC and singer Valerie M) had a #14 hit with "Good Rhymes", while musical trio the Dreem Teem had a #15 hit with "Buddy X 99", a garage remix of Neneh Cherry's 1992 song "Buddy X". DJ Luck & MC Neat also had a chart hit with "A Little Bit of Luck" in late 1999 into early 2000.

Many more UK garage acts followed into the new millennium by releasing commercially successful singles, thus making UK garage and 2-step a stable fixture on the UK charts for the next couple of years. Debut singles of various UK garage artists were hitting the number one spot on the UK charts. Craig David's debut solo single "Fill Me In", a mix of R&B and 2-step, with single formats containing various garage remixes of the track, hit number 1 in April 2000, while Sweet Female Attitude's "Flowers" was number 2.

MJ Cole, a classically trained oboe and piano player, had a string of chart and underground hits, most notably with "Sincere" in 1998 and "Crazy Love" in 2000. Cole also won a BBC "Young Musician of the Year" award.

American R&B influences can be heard in early UK garage intended for a commercial, rather than dancefloor, audience. Tracks like "Twentyfourseven" by Artful Dodger, a slower and simpler R&B-infused drum pattern can be heard, in contrast with the complex drum beats, heavy syncopation (swing) and more energetic tempo (normally between 130 and 138 BPM) that usually characterised UKG. Garage producers then proceeded to churn out UK versions of US contemporary R&B hits, such as the Architechs' version of Brandy and Monica's "The Boy Is Mine". The Architechs sped-up the vocals through time-stretching and added sound effects to increase the competitive nature. The "B&M Remix" eventually sold twenty thousand copies as a bootleg.

A month later, Oxide & Neutrino's "Bound 4 Da Reload (Casualty)" debuted atop the charts. Other top 10 hits in 2000 include Artful Dodger's "Movin' Too Fast" (#2), "Woman Trouble" (#6) and "Please Don't Turn Me On" (#4), True Steppers' "Buggin" (#6) and "Out of Your Mind" (#2), B-15 Project's "Girls Like Us" (#7), DJ Luck & MC Neat's "Masterblaster 2000" (#5) and "Ain't No Stoppin' Us" (#8), MJ Cole's "Crazy Love" (#10), Wookie's "Battle" (#10), Lonyo's "Summer of Love" (#8), Architechs' "Body Groove" (#3), and Oxide & Neutrino's "No Good 4 Me" (#6). Another huge hit in 2000 was the Timo Maas remix of the song "Dooms Night" (#8) by German producer Azzido Da Bass, which was heavily associated with UK garage at the time, having become a major club hit and appearing on several UK garage compilations. It was also remixed by garage duo Stanton Warriors, titled "Dooms Night (Revisited)".

In 2001, DJ Pied Piper and the Masters of Ceremonies's sole number one record "Do You Really Like It?" was released in July. Two months later in August 2001, South London collective So Solid Crew hit the top spot with their second single "21 Seconds". Daniel Bedingfield's debut single "Gotta Get Thru This" also hit number one the same year.

=== 2002: 2-step, dubstep and grime ===
As popular vocal tracks became chart hits and major garage nights became known for playing it safe by repeating the same anthems, a segment of the producers and promoters tried to pull back to more harder, deeper and more underground styles. Major breakthrough tracks on this front included Groove Chronicles (Noodles and El-B)'s "Stone Cold" and E.S. Dubs "Standard Hoodlum Issue" (with mixes By Zed Bias) in 1999, and Horsepower Productions's "Gorgon Sound" in 2000. Sarah Lockhart became a partner in the Tempa label founded by Neil Joliffe in 2000 to release Horsepower Productions; she then founded the FWD>> night in 2001, where the likes of Zed Bias, El-B, Wookie, Jay Da Flex, Noodles, DJ Zinc, Horsepower Productions, MJ Cole and Lockhart's brother DJ Youngsta played deeper sounds with emphasis on production values and heavy bass. In 2019 she stated that she'd wanted to create "a strand within a thing. Like Metalheadz within drum’n’bass". This - along with the Big Apple record shop and label in Croydon - was broadly seen to be where dubstep emerged as a club genre.

Simultaneously, 2-step was moving to a rougher and rawer sound that was favoured by clubs where MCs dominated. Early "breakstep" tracks like DJ Zinc's "138 Trek" and DJ Deekline's "I Don't Smoke". This then inspired young producers, and starting with Youngstar's "Pulse X" in 2002 was referred to by many terms including "sublow", "8-bar" and "grime", becoming a genre in its own right and eventually generally called grime by 2004. During this period, MCs became bigger names in UKG, bringing the genre closer to its rap influences than its soul influences. At this time, traditional UK garage was also being pushed back underground amongst the bad publicity emanating from the tougher side of the genre, including a high profile shooting at a So Solid Crew gig and the subsequent informal banning of UK garage acts from the West End.

During this time, there was also a strong division of class in UK garage. In the heyday of garage, the late 1990s, it was a highly aspirational genre. When people went to the club to hear garage, they dressed up. Clubs such as Twice as Nice enforced a dress code with no tennis shoes, jeans, or baseball caps. The dress codes were meant to "encourage people to make an effort", but also to "keep trouble out." In time, Twice as Nice installed a metal detector to screen for guns.

Eventually, when groups like So Solid Crew attracted younger, more urban, lower-class audiences to raves, garage began to transition to grime because previous audiences were less likely to listen.

=== Other subgenres ===
4x4 garage or "4-to-the-floor" garage initially referred to all garage that wasn't 2 step. It eventually evolved into its own subgenre with a greater influence from house music, and characteristic driving basslines and high-energy club rhythms. Examples include "Shut The Door" by Todd Edwards and "Reasons" by MPH & Oppidan.

Bassline garage, sometimes known as "niche" after the club where the style emerged, is often linked to the work of DJ Q. It developed in the mid-2000s in the UK, and borrows heavily from 4x4 and speed garage. Its recognisable traits include its speedy tempo, heavy basslines, and fast vocals. Example tracks include "Heartbroken" by T2 ft. Jodie Aysha.

Other subgenres include vocal garage, jazzstep, bumping garage, rollin' UKG, and old school garage. Future garage and funky house may also be considered subgenres of garage.

== Revivals ==
In 2007, several DJs helped promote and revive UK garage's popularity, with producers creating new UK garage, also known as "new skool" UK garage or "bassline". The end of 2007 saw "new skool" UK garage push to the mainstream again with notable tracks such as T2's "Heartbroken" and H "Two" O's "What's It Gonna Be" both reaching the mainstream charts. The revival was galvanised by DJ EZ releasing Pure Garage Rewind: Back to the Old Skool, which contained three CDs of "old skool" UK garage and a fourth CD with fresh "new skool" UK garage.

From 2009, future garage emerged as artists began using garage sounds in their music. Early 2011 saw the start of a gradual resurgence of 2-step garage. Producers such as Wookie, MJ Cole, Zed Bias and Mark Hill (formerly one half of Artful Dodger) made a return to the scene, by producing tracks with more of a 2-step feel.

Electronic music duos Disclosure and AlunaGeorge, both successful throughout 2012 and 2013, often use elements of UK garage in their music, and arguably, some of their biggest hits including "You & Me" and "We Are Chosen" respectively, are entirely 2-step with an updated cleaner sound. Shortly following this, "original" style garage had made a return in a big way, with producers such as Moony, DJD and Tuff Culture paving the way. One of the genre's pioneering labels, Ice Cream Records, responsible for anthems such as "RipGroove", True Steppers' "Out of Your Mind", Kele Le Roc's "My Love" and more, opened up their permanent roster for the first time to include DJs outside of the legendary trio that launched the label.

In February 2019, AJ Tracey's UKG song "Ladbroke Grove" initially debuted at number 48 on the UK Singles Chart, then eventually peaked at number three in October 2019 following its release as a single. In September 2019, the British Phonographic Industry certified the song as platinum for exceeding chart sales of 600,000. It was one of the best-selling songs of 2019.

The 2020s saw a resurgence in UKG and music influenced by it, including by Fred again.., Interplanetary Criminal, Swimming Paul, PinkPantheress, Disclosure, and Bicep. Pink Pantheress's song "Pain" interpolates Sweet Female Attitude's 2000 UKG hit "Flowers".

== Legacy ==
=== Role of MCs ===
Before the emergence of UKG, ragga MCs had a difficult time in the music scene but found solid footing through garage. Simon Reynolds wrote in Energy Flash: "the rude-boy factor of the ragga patois voice in speed garage anthems like Gant's "Sound Bwoy Burial" probably acted to 'inoculate' against the 'effeminate' sensuality of house."

The role of the MC, which is a central figure in UKG, originates from the Jamaican dancehall tradition of 'toasting' and its vibrant sound system culture. Like the Jamaican dancehall toaster, the garage MC is a typically masculine and animated character who evokes responses from the crowd and engages their attention in a gritty, provocative manner. Reynolds provided an example of how the crowd would shout "Bo!" if they love a record which had just been dropped into the mix. The MC would then instruct the DJ to immediately stop the tune, manually go back to the start and "come again".

=== Dubstep ===
The dark garage sound that was being produced by the likes of Wookie, Zed Bias, Shy Cookie, El-B and Artwork (of DND) in the late 1990s would set the groundwork for both grime and dubstep. Developing in parallel to grime, dubstep would take a mostly instrumental stripped down form of dark garage and with it bring in production values and influences from dub reggae.

=== UK funky ===
Some UK garage producers have moved to a different sound called UK funky, which takes production values from many different shades of soulful house music with elements of UK garage and blends them at a standard house music tempo, and soca with tribal style percussion from afrobeat.

=== Future garage ===
Future garage is a genre of electronic music that incorporates a variety of influences from UK garage and softer elements from 2-step garage, leading to an off-kilter rhythmic style. Characteristic sounds are pitched vocal chops, warm filtered reese basses, dark atmospheres (including synth pads, field recordings and other atmospheric sounds) and vinyl crackle. The tempo usually ranges from 130 to 140 bpm, but can also be slower or faster.

== See also ==
- List of UK garage artists
- List of UK garage songs
