= Dave Pearce =

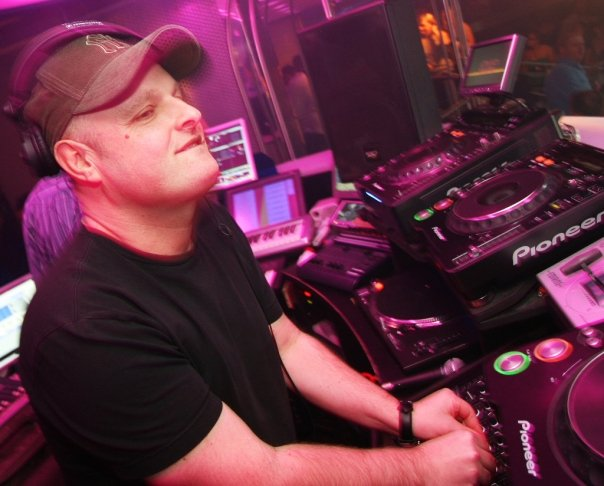
- Pearce in February 2008

Background information
- Born: David Alistair Pearce; 14 June 1963 (age 63); Surrey, England
- Occupations: Radio presenter, DJ, music producer
- Years active: 1980–present
- Website: DavePearce.co.uk

David Alistair Pearce (born 14 June 1963) is an English dance DJ, EDM producer and broadcaster, who has performed across the United Kingdom and the world. He previously presented Dance Anthems on BBC Radio 1 for ten years. He is renowned for playing a key role both as a performer and behind the scenes in the development of English dance and club culture.

== Early life ==
He is from Esher in Surrey. He attended Esher County Grammar School on Weston Green Road in Thames Ditton.

== Early career ==
Pearce's career began under the pseudonym Dave Adams at Radio Jackie 227, Britain's largest land-based pirate station. He also set up his own FM pirate station, DDP Radio, in Claygate, Surrey, together with Paul Kent (Eugene Perera), Graham Stuart (Graham Copland) and Steve Collins (Stephen Benzikie).

Dave played his first international DJ job aged 17 playing at Studio 29 in Mumbai, India.

On his return to Britain, Pearce started on BBC Radio London, presenting Thursday Night Funk Fantasy from 13 September 1984. He presented some shows from New York which were simulcast on WBLS in New York. The show featured new imports from America and the latest club tracks in the United Kingdom.

Some months later Pearce created the BBC's first hip hop show A Fresh Start to the Week airing Monday nights. Pearce introduced a number of early hip hop events in the UK including The Raising Hell Tour with Run-D.M.C. and Beastie Boys at the Hammersmith Odeon, Mantronix at Town and Country Club and Afrika Bambaataa at Wag Club. He staged his own events including T La Rock, Derek B and Cookie Crew at Camden Palace and most famously introduced Public Enemy on stage at their landmark 1987 Def Jam Tour. Public Enemy used Pearce's introduction on their acclaimed album It Takes a Nation of Millions to Hold Us Back.

He created a national hip hop phone line for UK rappers with a weekly MC battle called Hip Hop Connection. This subsequently became the UK's first hip hop magazine.

He became manager of UK rapper Overlord X and was executive producer of Streetsounds Hip Hop 20, the first album to merge American hip hop with UK artists.

Following the murder of DJ Scott La Rock, Pearce was approached by New York's B-Boy Records to remix KRS-One & Scott La Rock's South Bronx which was featured on a tribute album to raise funds for Scott La Rock's family.

In 1988, BBC Radio London became GLR Greater London Radio where Pearce started a nightly show focused on a mixture of club music including the emerging house scene, acid house and rap. House pioneers Frankie Knuckles and Tony Humphries had their first UK radio interviews on Pearce's shows. Also at this time Pearce became A&R director of Urban Records (Polydor) signing the UK's biggest selling acid house album Urban Acid. Also this year Pearce played himself in an episode of the BBC drama South of the Border.

In 1990, Pearce became part of the original line up of Kiss 100 FM hosting the drivetime show. He also performed at live events including Brixton Academy with artists including Ten City and Soul II Soul. He then co-promoted a series of raves at the London Astoria. He also had a weekly rave at Jazz in Purley, South London and became resident at House of Windsor. Pearce set up an underground rave label, Reachin Records, signing artists including Urban Hype and Boneshakers.

Pearce took over the Kiss 100 breakfast show from Craig Charles and co-presented The Dangerous Breakfast Show with Sarah HB. He presented live shows from Detroit, New York and Chicago. The show was immortalised in a limited edition Marvel comic. Pearce became the music reviewer on ITV's Video View.

== 2000s–present ==
In 2001, he appeared in the midnight slot at the Millennium Dome in London playing to 45,000 people at Ministry of Sound's party. Also in 2001, Pearce wrote and presented The Dance Years, a weekly clubbing TV show on ITV, and he guest hosted MTV's Dancefloor Chart. He became dance music correspondent to The Sun newspaper writing Dance Bizarre, then moved to his own weekly page in The Daily Star.

In 2024, Pearce opened for the UK leg of the Pet Shop Boys' highly acclaimed Dreamland tour, with a classic Dance Anthems DJ set.

=== NuLife label ===
In 2000, Pearce created a new record label in partnership with BMG – NuLife Recordings which scored a string of top 40 hits including a number one with Rui da Silva's "Touch Me" (2001), a number 2 with Truesteppers, Victoria Beckham and Dane Bowers' "Out of Your Mind" (2000) and a number 3 with Ian Van Dahl's "Castles in the Sky" (2001). Pearce had 10 consecutive top 10 dance compilations and a number of gold albums including Transcendental Euphoria, Very Best of Dave Pearce Dance Anthems and Dave Pearce Trance Anthems. In 2001, Pearce was honoured with a coveted British Independent Film Award (BIFA) for his work on the soundtrack to the Richard Parry film South West 9. After leaving BMG, he signed to Ministry of Sound and hosted trance nights and released a new brand called Delirium.

== Career in radio ==
=== BBC Radio 1 ===
Pearce joined BBC Radio 1 in April 1995, and stayed there until 1 August 2008 taking over the weekday early breakfast show from Bruno Brookes. His first show was sitting in for Pete Tong on the Essential Selection. He also became the stand in for Chris Evans on the Radio 1 Breakfast Show. Later that year he took over the weekend mid-morning slot on Radio 1 and created The Recovery Session – a breakfast show for clubbers. In February 1997, he took over the weekend breakfast show then in October became the presenter of drivetime on Radio 1 taking over from Kevin Greening where he introduced a daily mix of dance music – the Mix at Six. That year Pearce devised and created Dance Anthems on Sundays at 7pm which achieved the station's third highest audience share. He presented the show for 10 years. He also created and presented the Radio 1 dance parties which were broadcast on beaches across the UK to crowds of up to 25,000 people with guest DJs including Paul van Dyk, Carl Cox, Sasha and Boy George. He undertook a national tour with Leeds club Up Yer Ronson and then launched his own national dance anthems tour. He achieved his first gold album in 1999 for his compilation Dave Pearce Dance Anthems, released on Universal.

In 1998, Pearce started a new late drive show Monday to Thursdays 6-8pm. He became the first main Radio 1 DJ to hold a weekly residency in Ibiza at Eden nightclub which he held for 10 years working with various brands including Euphoria, Slinky and Gatecrasher. In the remaining years at Radio 1 he toured extensively in Europe with residencies in Ibiza, Mallorca, Tenerife, Corfu and Zante. Pearce hosted Radio 1's Into the Millennium show live from an outdoor stage in Glasgow and was the first voice on BBC Radio 1 in the 2000s decade.

Pearce celebrated 10 years of Dance Anthems at Radio 1 in August 2007. The 5-hour special show included input from David Morales, Faithless, Pete Tong, Judge Jules and a phone-in from Tiesto.

=== BBC Radio 6 Music ===
Pearce returned to BBC radio on Sunday 5 October 2008 hosting a new show on BBC Radio 6 Music from 8pm to 10pm, playing dance music from the last 30 years. Noel Gallagher was the first celebrity guest to pick his favourite dance anthem, which was "Strings of Life" by Rhythm Is Rhythm. He created a weekly bedroom producer slot showcasing new talent. Pearce also presented occasional shows on BBC Radio 2 including New Year's Eve parties and he wrote and presented a series on disco.

Pearce presented Dave Pearce's Top 100 Dance Anthems on MTV. During this period, he toured extensively and achieved gold album sales with Dave Pearce Trance Anthems 2008 and 2009 on Ministry of Sound and released a 10-CD retrospective of dance, Dance Years.

=== BBC Radio 2 ===
Pearce's 6 Music show ended on Sunday 3 April 2011 before he moved to a new 10 part weekly Thursday nostalgic dance show (airing 11pm till midnight starting 14 April 2011) on BBC Radio 2. He also sat in on Janice Long's show. From April 2012, Pearce presented a weekly Saturday night show: Dave Pearce Dance Years (airing from 10pm – midnight) till 26 September 2013. Guests on the show included Calvin Harris, Pet Shop Boys, Disclosure, Duke Dumont, Todd Terry, Marshall Jefferson, Boy George and David Guetta. Dave returned to Radio 2 in a new 11 part weekly slot, airing on Wednesday nights starting on 8 October 2014.

Pearce has continued to tour extensively including performing at Atlantis The Palm, Dubai and various festivals including BugJam and Birmingham Pride.

In summer 2013, Pearce took residency at BCM in Mallorca and released a new album, BCM Mallorca 2013.

=== Dave Pearce Anthems ===
A new show started on 1 March 2014 called Dave Pearce Anthems, a three-hour weekly syndicated show for UK radio stations, broadcast on Saturday nights. It was aired on UTV Radio, Fire Radio, Hampshire Hit Radio and Energy FM.

It was discontinued in 2016 before being re-launched in 2018 by Blue Revolution. The new Dance Anthems show airs on Energy FM and Hampshire Hit Radio.
