= Do You Really Like It? =

2001 single by DJ Pied Piper and the Masters of Ceremonies

Single by DJ Pied Piper and the Masters of Ceremonies
- Released: 21 May 2001
- Genre: 2-step garage
- Length: 3:22
- Label: Relentless; Ministry of Sound
- Songwriters: Andrew Livingstone; Ronnie Nwohia; Eugene Nwohia; Steve Wickham; Paul Newman
- Producers: DJ Pied Piper; the Unknown MC

DJ Pied Piper and the Masters of Ceremonies singles chronology
"Do You Really Like It?" (2001)	"We R Here" (2001)

Music video
- "Do You Really Like It?" on YouTube

"Do You Really Like It?" is a song by UK garage music group DJ Pied Piper and the Masters of Ceremonies. The single topped the UK Singles Chart in June 2001. It has sold more than 600,000 copies in the United Kingdom according to the British Phonographic Industry (BPI).

== Background ==
The track first circulated as a dubplate in the Ayia Napa club scene during the summer of 2000. Before the national push, an earlier independent pressing appeared on the Official Independent Singles Chart at the end of 2000 (label: Soulfood; cat. no. SF007). Ministry of Sound and its affiliate Relentless jointly signed "Do You Really Like It?" in March 2001, with Music Week describing it as "one of the most expensive two-step deals in recent times" after an earlier licensing appearance on the label’s Real Garage compilation.

== Critical reception ==
Music writer Tom Ewing, in his blog, Popular, described "Do You Really Like It?" as a track that distilled the essence of UK garage into a pop-friendly form, combining a sing-along chorus, shouted vocal interjections, and a 2-step beat that captured the communal energy of the genre at its commercial peak. He noted that the song's hook ("We're lovin' it, lovin' it, lovin' it...") is memorable and infectious but also argued that the track as a whole "doesn't really make sense," with abrupt changes in tempo and direction that can feel awkward. Despite this, he considered the track emblematic of UK garage's appeal to mainstream audiences, highlighting its communal energy and friendly accessibility compared with darker or more underground garage tracks of the era.

The song's prominence in British pop culture was noted by The Guardian in June 2001, which referenced its "terrifying success" as emblematic of the season’s novelty-leaning chart landscape. In December 2001, The Guardian again characterised it as an "irritating novelty hit," while discussing UK garage's mainstream fortunes that year.

Retrospectively, NME included "Do You Really Like It?" in its roundup of notable tracks from 2001, reflecting its lasting recognition in year-end discourse. Mixmag placed it within its list of key UKG tracks from 1995–2005.

== Music videos ==
An accompanying music video for "Do You Really Like It?" was directed by Phil Griffin and Jez Morell and released in 2001. In 2024, the group recorded a new rework of the track for Andrex a British toilet paper brand, with the new video created by Chloë Victoria Hughes in collaboration with DRUM/RadicalMedia.

== Track listings ==
UK CD single

1. "Do You Really Like It?" (radio edit)
2. "Do You Really Like It?" (full length original version)
3. "Do You Really Like It?" (a cappella)
4. "Do You Really Like It?" (video)

UK cassette single

1. "Do You Really Like It?" (radio edit)
2. "Do You Really Like It?" (full length original version)

European maxi-CD single

1. "Do You Really Like It?" (radio edit) – 3:22
2. "Do You Really Like It?" (full length original version) – 5:31
3. "Do You Really Like It?" (a cappella) – 0:28
4. "Do You Really Like It?" (full length Sovereign mix vocal) – 5:59
5. "Do You Really Like It?" (vocal dub PA) – 6:01

Australian CD single

1. "Do You Really Like It?" (radio edit)
2. "Do You Really Like It?" (full length Sovereign mix vocal)
3. "Do You Really Like It?" (full length original version)
4. "Do You Really Like It?" (a cappella)

== Charts ==
=== Weekly charts ===
Chart (2001)	Peak position
Australia (ARIA)	33
Australian Urban (ARIA)	8
Europe (Eurochart Hot 100)	11
Ireland (IRMA)	13
Ireland Dance (IRMA)	2
Scottish Singles Sales (Official Charts)	3
UK Singles (Official Charts)	1
UK Dance (Official Charts)	1

=== Year-end charts ===
Chart (2001)	Position
UK Singles (OCC)	11

=== Decade-end charts ===
Chart (2000–2009)	Position
UK Singles (OCC)	97

== Certifications ==
Region	Certification	Certified units/sales
United Kingdom (BPI)	Platinum	600,000^{‡}
^{‡} Sales+streaming figures based on certification alone.

== Release history ==
Region	Date	Format(s)	Label(s)	Ref.
United Kingdom	21 May 2001	12-inch vinyl; CD; cassette	Relentless; Ministry of Sound	
Australia	3 September 2001	CD	Relentless; Ministry of Sound	

== Samplings ==
The song's guitar hook was interpolated in "Really Love" by KSI featuring Craig David and Digital Farm Animals, which peaked at number three on the UK Singles Chart in October 2020. DJ Pied Piper and the Masters of Ceremonies are therefore credited as co-songwriters on the song. In September 2021, British rapper Tinie Tempah released the single "Love Me Like This" featuring vocalist Maia Wright which interpolates the lyric "Do you really like it, is it is it wicked".

== In popular culture ==
In 2018, this song was parodied in a UK radio advert for the Financial Conduct Authority's PPI claims deadline, which was on 29 August 2019.
