= True Steppers =

British UK garage production duo

- Origin: United Kingdom
- Genres: UK garage
- Years active: 1999–2000
- Labels: Ice Cream, NuLife
- Past members: Jonny Lisners; Andy Lysandrou
- Website: icecreamrecords.co.uk

True Steppers were a British UK garage production duo, consisting of Jonny Lisners and Andy Lysandrou.

They had success with Dane Bowers on "Buggin", which peaked at number six on the UK Singles Chart in April 2000.

Their biggest selling record came in August 2000, when True Steppers collaborated with Dane Bowers and Victoria Beckham on "Out of Your Mind". There was a wave of publicity for this single and Victoria involved her husband, David Beckham, for the in-store record signings. There was a chart battle with Spiller and Sophie Ellis-Bextor, whose summer dance track "Groovejet (If This Ain't Love)" was released in the same week. True Steppers were leading in the midweek published chart, but Spiller and Ellis-Bextor had overtaken them by Saturday. Spiller was announced as No. 1 on the Sunday, with True Steppers at No. 2. They later released another single, this time with former East 17 singer Brian Harvey and American R&B singer Donell Jones, called "True Step Tonight" which reached number 25, and an album named True Stepping.

== Discography ==
=== Albums ===
- True Stepping (2000)

=== Singles ===
List of singles, with selected chart positions
Title	Year	Peak chart positions			Album
Title	Year	UK	UK Dance	UK R&B	Album
"The Finest"	1999	—	—	—	Non-album singles
"Hurt You So '99"	1999	—	—	—	Non-album singles
"Beng Beng" (featuring Top Cat)	1999	—	—	—	Non-album singles
"Buggin" (featuring Dane Bowers)	2000	6	2	2	True Stepping
"Out of Your Mind" (with Dane Bowers featuring Victoria Beckham)	2000	2	10	—	True Stepping
"True Step Tonight" (featuring Brian Harvey and Donell Jones)	2000	25	28	—	True Stepping
