= DJ Pied Piper and the Masters of Ceremonies =

UK garage collaboration

- Origin: London, England
- Genre: UK garage
- Years active: 2000–2002
- Labels: Soul Food Recordings, Relentless
- Past members: DJ Pied Piper; MC DT; Melody; Sharky P Unknown MC

DJ Pied Piper and the Masters of Ceremonies were a UK garage collaboration between producer and DJ Pied Piper and the MCs DT (responsible for the line "we're loving it, loving it, loving it"), Melody, Sharky P and the Unknown MC (Kamanchi Sly, formerly of the group Hijack), who were active in the early 2000s. They are best known for their number one hit song "Do You Really Like It?".

== Musical career ==
In June 2001, the group's debut single "Do You Really Like It?" topped the UK Singles Chart for one week. It stayed on the chart for a total of 14 weeks during the summer of 2001. The track also appears on several albums of the UK garage compilation series Pure Garage. DJ Pied Piper and the Masters of Ceremonies occasionally appeared as guests on DJ EZ's weekly UKG show on Kiss 100.

In 2002, a mashup of "Do You Really Like It?" and Jammin's "Kinda Funky" titled "Kinda Wicked" was released on white label.

== Discography ==
=== Singles ===
List of singles, with selected chart positions and certifications, showing year released and album name
Title	Year	Peak chart positions			Certifications	Album
Title	Year	UK	AUS	IRE	Certifications	Album
"Do You Really Like It?"	2001	1	33	13	BPI: Gold	Non-album singles
"We R Here"	2001	–	–	–		Non-album singles
