= Double 99 =

1995–2001 UK garage duo

- Also known as: 10° Below; R.I.P. Productions
- Origin: London, England
- Genres: UK garage; speed garage
- Years active: 1995–2001
- Labels: Ice Cream Records; Satellite Recordings
- Past members: Timothy Liken; Omar Adimora

Double 99, also known as R.I.P. Productions and 10° Below, were a UK garage duo which consisted of members Timothy Andrew Liken (Tim Deluxe) and Omar Adimora. They are best known for their sole UK chart hit single "RipGroove", which reached No. 14 in its second release on the UK Singles Chart in 1997.

== Career ==
Active since 1995, the duo recorded as R.I.P. Productions and 10° Below, releasing tracks and EPs on the Ice Cream label which they founded alongside Boogie Beat co-owner Andy Lysandrou (later of True Steppers). Under the name R.I.P., their 1997 EP Double 99 first featured the track "RipGroove" with Double 99 later adopted as their alias for the single.

Both Liken and Adimora later continued to release solo material and remained active as DJs, remixers and producers under the names Tim Deluxe and DJ Omar / Omar Chandla, respectively. Deluxe had a hit in 2002 with his second solo single, "It Just Won't Do", which reached the top 20 charts in five countries including the UK where it peaked at No. 14.

== Discography ==
=== Albums ===
- 2001: 7th High (BMG/Arista)

=== Singles ===
Year	Title	Peak chart positions				Album
Year	Title	UK	UK Dance	EUR	SCO	Album
1997	"RipGroove"	31	—	94	66	7th High
1997	"RipGroove" (featuring Top Cat) (re-issue)	14	1	29	50	7th High
2000	"Freakazoid"	—	—	—	—	7th High
2000	"Satisfied"	—	—	—	—	7th High
2000	"Scream"	—	—	—	—	7th High
2001	"7th High" (featuring Sneaker Pimps)	114	—	—	—	7th High
"—" denotes items that did not chart or were not released in that territory.
