= Victoria Beckham discography =

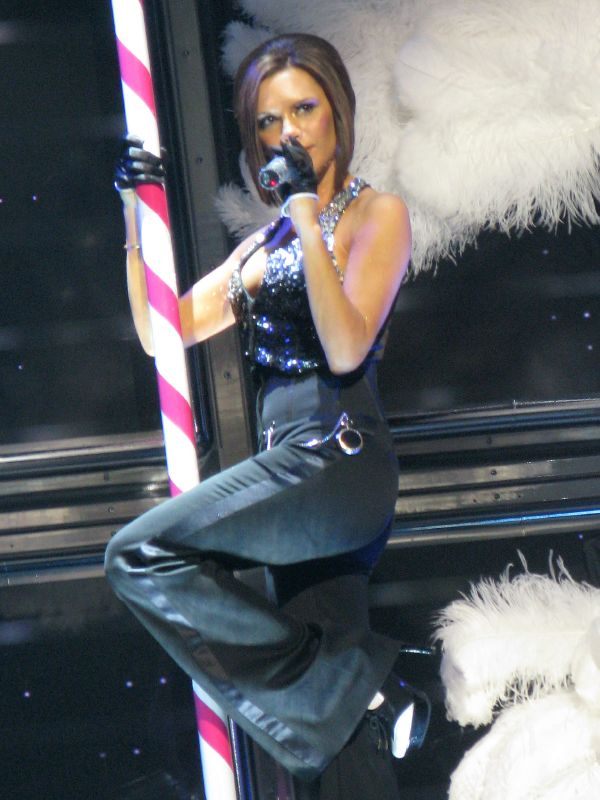
- Beckham performing during The Return of the Spice Girls in December 2007
- Studio albums: 1
- Singles: 5
- Music videos: 5

The discography of Victoria Beckham, an English pop music singer, consists of one studio album, two cancelled albums, five singles, five music videos and one DVD. On 14 August 2000, Beckham released her first solo single, "Out of Your Mind" in collaboration with Dane Bowers and Truesteppers, which debuted at number 2 in the UK Singles Chart. Before the single's release, on 8 July 2000, Beckham made her public solo debut at London's Hyde Park at a concert to raise money for the Prince's Trust charity. She sang "Out of Your Mind" to a 100,000-strong audience. Beckham then signed a recording contract with the Spice Girls' label Virgin Records. Her next single as a solo artist, "Not Such an Innocent Girl", was released on 17 September 2001. Again, she faced competition in another hugely hyped chart battle, this time with Kylie Minogue's single "Can't Get You Out of My Head". Despite a huge promotional campaign, Beckham was outsold eight to one, and her single debuted at number 6. Beckham's eponymous debut album, which was released on 1 October 2001, reached number 10 in the UK Albums Chart. The album cost a reputed £5 million to produce, and it sold a modest 100,000 copies. The second and final single to be released from the album was "A Mind of Its Own" on 11 February 2002. The single reached number 6 in the UK and sold 56,500 copies. A third single, "I Wish", was promoted but never materialised.

In 2002, Telstar Records signed Beckham in a deal made with 19 Management worth £1.5 million. In 2003 Beckham's first single with Telstar, "Let Your Head Go / This Groove", was released in the UK on 29 December 2003 and charted at number 3. Beckham spent much of that year recording two pop/urban-influenced albums called Open Your Eyes and Come Together. These albums never materialised, and amidst the collapse of Telstar and bankruptcy of the label, remaining plans for Beckham's music career were shelved and cancelled. All promotional albums and tracks have been leaked and are available on YouTube and various sources online.

== Albums ==
=== Studio album ===
List of studio albums, with selected chart positions
Title	Details	Peak chart positions				
Title	Details	UK	AUS Heat.	IRE	JPN	SCO
Victoria Beckham	Released: 1 October 2001; Formats: cassette, CD, digital download; Label: Virgin	10	20	69	11	20

=== Video album ===
List of video albums
Title	Details
The 'Réal' Beckhams	Released: 2 February 2004; Formats: DVD; Label: Telstar

=== Unreleased albums ===
List of unreleased albums
Title	Details
Open Your Eyes	Recorded in 2003. Beckham worked on two albums, Open Your Eyes, with electropop songs, and Come Together, with R&B and hip hop songs. The albums were cancelled when Telstar went bankrupt before the releases.
Come Together	Recorded in 2003. Beckham worked on two albums, Open Your Eyes, with electropop songs, and Come Together, with R&B and hip hop songs. The albums were cancelled when Telstar went bankrupt before the releases.

== Singles ==
=== As main artist ===
List of singles, showing year released, selected chart positions and originating album
Title	Year	Peak chart positions								Sales	Album
Title	Year	UK	AUS	BEL Tip	IRE	ITA	ROM	SCO	SPA	Sales	Album
"Not Such an Innocent Girl"	2001	6	36	14	23	32	—	10	15	UK: 400,000 (Note: Sales as of April 2014)	Victoria Beckham
"A Mind of Its Own"	2002	6	—	—	—	—	—	7	—	UK: 60,000 (Note: Sales as of April 2014)	Victoria Beckham
"This Groove" / "Let Your Head Go"	2003	3	—	—	17	—	91	—	3	UK: 68,000 (Note: Sales as of April 2014)	Non-album single
"—" denotes releases that did not chart or were not released in that territory.

=== As featured artist ===
List of singles as featured artist, showing year released, selected chart positions, certifications and originating album
Title	Year	Peak chart positions									Certifications	Album
Title	Year	UK	AUS	BEL	IRE	ITA	NLD	NOR	SWE	SWI	Certifications	Album
"Out of Your Mind" (True Steppers and Dane Bowers featuring Victoria Beckham)	2000	2	27	39	4	33	16	5	23	98	BPI: Gold; FIMI: Gold	True Stepping

=== Promotional singles ===
List of promotional singles, showing year released and originating album
Title	Year	Album
"It's That Simple" (featuring M.O.P.)	2003	Non-album single

== Other appearances ==
List of other appearances, showing year released and originating album
Title	Year	Album
"What'chu Talkin 'Bout"	2001	Soul Power
"I Wish"	2002	Bend It Like Beckham
"This Groove" (featuring Jim Jones)	2004	Ryder Musik (Special Edition)

== Music videos ==
List of music videos, showing year released and director
Title	Year	Director
"Out of Your Mind"	2000	Jake Nava
"Not Such an Innocent Girl"	2001	Jake Nava
"A Mind of Its Own"	2002	Simon Atkinson and Adam Townly
"This Groove"	2003	Andy Hylton
"Let Your Head Go"	2003	Scott Lyon
