= Let's Come Together =

Let's Come Together may be:

- a reference to—or misremembered title of—the song Sweet Harmony, due to its eponymous refrain
- "Let's Come Together", a 1970 comedy album by Rudy Ray Moore
- Let's Come Together (Chinese: 大家一起來), a 1980s Taiwainese version of Family Feud
- "Let's Come Together", a song by Norman Brown from the 1994 album After the Storm
- "Let's Come Together", a song by DJ BoBo from the 1996 single album Love Is the Price
- "Let's Come Together", a 2001 song by Bliss
- "Let's Come Together", 2008 album by Kevin LeVar
- "Let's Come Together", a 2017 song by Napoli
- "Let's Come Together", a song by Normahl

== See also ==
- Come Together (disambiguation)
