= This Groove =

2003 single by Victoria Beckham

Single by Victoria Beckham
- A-side: "Let Your Head Go"
- Released: 29 December 2003
- Genre: R&B; hip hop
- Length: 3:36
- Label: Telstar
- Songwriters: Alisha Brooks; David Conley; David Frank; Everett "Jam" Benton; Mic Murphy
- Producers: Damon Dash; David Conley; David Frank

Victoria Beckham singles chronology
"A Mind of Its Own" (2002)	"This Groove" / "Let Your Head Go" (2003)

"This Groove" is a song by British singer Victoria Beckham, recorded for her unreleased second studio album. It was written by Alisha Brooks, David Conley, David Frank, Everett "Jam" Benton and Mic Murphy, with Damon Dash, Conley and Frank serving as producers. Telstar Records released the song on 29 December 2003 in the United Kingdom as a double A-side with "Let Your Head Go". In 2004, it was included on the video album The 'Réal' Beckhams, after her record company went bankrupt before it surfaced. The song is Beckham's last single released to date. "This Groove" is an R&B and hip hop song which samples The System's "Don't Disturb This Groove"; lyrically it deals with phone sex.

"This Groove" received positive reviews from music critics, with one of them labeling it as one of the finest moments of Beckham's solo career. Following heavy promotion with many televised appearances in the United Kingdom, the release entered the UK Singles Chart at number three, after facing a chart battle with Sophie Ellis Bextor's "I Won't Change You", with whom Beckham was previously involved in a much publicised chart battle years prior. It became the 88th best selling single of 2004 in the region, and also reached the top three in Scotland and charted within the top 20 in Ireland. An accompanying music video was directed by Andy Hylton, and depicts Beckham alone rolling around on a bed.

== Background and composition ==
In 2002, after leaving Virgin Records, Beckham signed a contract with Telstar Records and 19 Entertainment, run by Simon Fuller, who also managed the Spice Girls, of which Beckham was a member; the contract was reportedly worth £1.5 million. The singer then began working on her second solo studio album. Upon meeting American urban producer Damon Dash, she opted to explore a more urban sound, recording hip hop-influenced tracks. At the time, Dash declared: "If we can make Victoria hot, we can make anyone hot". They also had plans to release the recorded material in the United States. However, Fuller did not think hip hop music would suit Beckham's style, and wanted her to stick with formulaic pop music.

Beckham's first release with Telstar was the double A-side single "This Groove"/"Let Your Head Go", which was released in the United Kingdom on 29 December 2003, following heavy promotion and many TV appearances across the Christmas period. The two tracks were released as a double A-side single as Fuller and Beckham did not agree on which direction the album should take. The disagreement would be first mediated by viewers of Top of the Pops, who would be allowed to watch the videos to both songs and vote for their favorite, and Beckham would perform the winner song on the following week on the show; "This Groove" received more votes, becoming the winner. With the media describing her solo music career a failure, Beckham's second solo studio album was shelved and never released. She was eventually dismissed from Telstar when the company became bankrupt, and gave up music to focus on her fashion career. "This Groove"/"Let Your Head Go" remains Beckham's last single release to date. The songs were eventually included on the video album The 'Réal' Beckhams (2004).

"This Groove" was written by Alisha Brooks, David Conley, David Frank, Everett "Jam" Benton and Mic Murphy, with Dash, Conley and Frank serving as producers. The song samples and interpolates the melody of The System's "Don't Disturb This Groove" (1987), for which Frank and Murphy also received songwriting credits. It features backing vocals by Beckham, Alesha "China" Jones and M'jestie. Aziatic provided drum programming, while Benton also played keyboards, bass, and percussion on the song. Conley, Geoff Allen and Larry Phillabaum recorded and engineered "This Groove" at 9601 Music Factory in Newport News, Virginia, as well as at Sony Music Studios and The Hit Factory in New York City, with the assistance by M'jestie, Baby Girl, Brandon Brown, Frantz Verna, Geoff Rice, Jason Dale, Patrick Woodward and Sebastien Nicolat. It was mixed by Tony "Magic" Maserati at The Hit Factory, with Woodward and Nicolet serving as assistant engineers, and Walter Coelho mastered it at Masterpiece. Musically, "This Groove" is a mid-tempo R&B and hip hop song. Lyrically, it deals with phone sex, with Beckham stating, "Hi. It's me. You wouldn't believe what I'm doing. What are you doing?"; the subject gets more evident as she sings, "I want you to come and listen to my body sing. Ya wanna hear my bell ring?."

== Reception ==
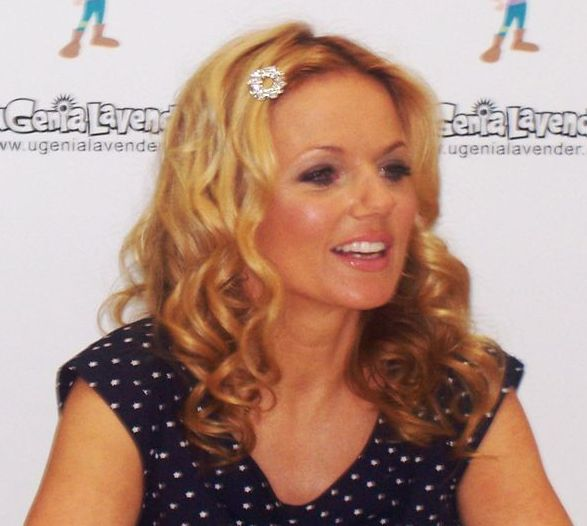
In the United Kingdom, "This Groove"/"Let Your Head Go" became the highest-charting single by a Spice Girls member since Geri Halliwell's "It's Raining Men" (2001)

"This Groove" received positive reviews from music critics. Jon O'Brien from Billboard called it one of Beckham's "finest solo moments" which "briefly suggested that partnering with producer Damon Dash may not have been such an incongruous choice after all"; he also noted that it was "also one of the few times that Beckham looked and sounded entirely at ease going it alone". David Sinclair in the book Spice Girls Revisited: How The Spice Girls Reinvented Pop described the track as a "cool, somewhat smutty R&B number". Heart staff pointed out that it was a "slick R&B slow-jam", while The Independent's Andy White saw it as "dreamy". Music Week staff described both "This Groove" and "Let Your Head Go" as "inoffensive pop/dance/R&B hybrids, treated to an ultra-sleek production that makes the most of her vocal proficiency."

In the United Kingdom, "This Groove"/"Let Your Head Go" faced a chart battle with Sophie Ellis Bextor's "I Won't Change You"; they were previously involved in a much publicised chart battle in 2000, when their singles were also released in the same week. (Note: In August 2000, Beckham's single "Out of Your Mind" faced a chart battle with Ellis-Bextor's "Groovejet (If This Ain't Love)", being dubbed "Posh vs. Posher" by the tabloids; Ellis-Bextor eventually kept Beckham off the top spot at the time.) Beckham's single entered the UK Singles Chart at number three on the week ending on 4 January 2004, behind Michael Andrews and Gary Jules' "Mad World", and Ozzy and Kelly Osbourne's "Changes", despite weeks of intense publicity prior to its release; Ellis-Bextor's song entered at number nine. It became the highest chart position for a solo Spice Girl single since Geri Halliwell's "It's Raining Men" topped the chart in 2001 and remained on the charts for eight weeks, becoming the 88th best-selling single of 2004 in the region. In April 2014, the Official Charts Company revealed that the single was Beckham's third biggest selling solo single in the region, out of four singles, with a total of 69,000 copies sold. In other parts of Europe, the release experienced mixed success, reaching number three in Scotland, and number 17 in Ireland. It also reached number 91 in Romania. Across the pan-Eurochart Hot 100 Singles, it peaked at number 10.

== Music video ==
An accompanying music video was directed by Andy Hylton. It was filmed in two days, back-to-back with the video for "Let Your Head Go"; Beckham explained that the visuals were attached to one another, with the "This Groove" clip described as being serious, while the one for "Let Your Head Go" was a "piss-taker". She elaborated saying they wanted to have a real sort of boudoir kind of feel in the video, as well as a "fashion but not so fashionable" look. The song was sped up during filming to give a sexier look when slowed down during post production. The video shows Beckham alone rolling around on a bed, wearing "sexy nightie, fishnet stockings and stilettos". It was later included on the video album The 'Réal' Beckhams (2004).

== Track listings ==
- UK CD1
1. "This Groove" (radio mix) – 3:36
2. "Let Your Head Go" (radio mix) – 3:41
- UK CD2
1. "Let Your Head Go" (Jakatta Remix) – 7:20
2. "This Groove" (Para-Beats Remix) – 4:36
3. "Let Your Head Go" (radio mix) – 3:41
4. "This Groove" (radio mix) – 3:36

== Credits and personnel ==
Credits and personnel adapted from the CD single's liner notes.

- Victoria Beckham – main and backing vocals
- Alisha Brooks – songwriting
- David Conley – songwriter, producer, recorded
- David Frank – songwriter, additional producer
- Everett "Jam" Benton – songwriting, co-production, keyboards, bass, percussion
- Mic Murphy – songwriter
- Damon Dash – producer
- Alesha "China" Jones – backing vocals
- M'jestie – backing vocals, co-producer, assistant engineer
- Aziatic – co-producer, drum programming
- Jason QS Lockley – co-producer
- Tony "Magic" Maserati – mixing
- Patrick Woodward – assistant engineer
- Sebastien Nicolet – assistant engineer
- Baby Girl – assistant engineer
- Brandon Brown – assistant engineer
- Frantz Verna – assistant engineer
- Geoff Rice – assistant engineer
- Jason Dale – assistant engineer
- Geoff Allen – recording engineer
- Larry Phillabaum – recording engineer
- Walter Coelho – mastering

== Charts ==
All entries charted with "Let Your Head Go".

=== Weekly charts ===
Weekly chart performance for "This Groove"
Chart (2004)	Peak position
Europe (Eurochart Hot 100)	10
Ireland (IRMA)	17
Romania (Romanian Top 100)	91
Scotland Singles (OCC)	3
UK Singles (OCC)	3

=== Year-end chart ===
Year-end chart performance for "This Groove"
Chart (2004)	Position
UK Singles (OCC)	88
