= Let Your Head Go =

2003 single by Victoria Beckham

Single by Victoria Beckham
- A-side: "This Groove"
- Released: 29 December 2003
- Genre: Pop; dance; R&B
- Length: 3:41
- Label: Telstar
- Songwriters: Klas Baggstrom; Liz Winstanley; Roger Olsson
- Producers: Klas Baggstrom; Liz Winstanley; Roger Olsson; Mike Gray; Jon Pearn

Victoria Beckham singles chronology
"A Mind of Its Own" (2002)	"This Groove" / "Let Your Head Go" (2003)

Music video
- "Let Your Head Go" on YouTube

"Let Your Head Go" is a song by British singer Victoria Beckham, recorded for her unreleased second studio album. It was written and produced by Klas Baggstrom, Liz Winstanley and Roger Olsson, with Mike Gray and Jon Pearn also serving as producers. The song was released on 29 December 2003 in the United Kingdom by Telstar Records, as a double A-side with "This Groove". In 2004, the former was included on the video album The 'Réal' Beckhams, after Beckham's record company went bankrupt before it surfaced. The song is Beckham's last single released to date. It is a pop, dance and R&B song with elements of dance-pop and electro-pop. "Let Your Head Go" drew comparisons to both Kylie Minogue and Cyndi Lauper's work.

"Let Your Head Go" received positive reviews from music critics, who thought it was among Beckham's best solo works. Following heavy promotion with many televised appearances by Beckham in the UK, the release entered the UK Singles Chart at number three, and faced a chart battle with Sophie Ellis-Bextor's "I Won't Change You", with whom she was previously involved in a much publicised chart battle in 2000. It became the 88th best selling single of 2004 in the region, and also reached the top three in Scotland and charted within the top 20 in Ireland. An accompanying music video was directed by Scott Lyon and shows Beckham satirising her life as a celebrity.

== Background ==
In 2002, after leaving Virgin Records, Beckham signed a contract with Telstar Records and 19 Entertainment, run by Simon Fuller, who also managed the Spice Girls, of which Beckham was a member; the contract was reportedly worth £1.5 million. The singer then began working on her second solo studio album upon meeting American urban producer Damon Dash, when she opted to explore a more urban sound, recording hip hop-influenced tracks. At the time, Dash declared: "If we can make Victoria hot, we can make anyone hot". However, Fuller did not think hip hop music would suit Beckham's style, and wanted her to stick with formulaic pop music. Beckham and Fuller had plans to release the recorded material in the United States, but never eventuated.

Beckham's first release with Telstar was the double A-side single "Let Your Head Go"/"This Groove", which was released in the United Kingdom on 29 December 2003, following heavy promotion and many TV appearances across the Christmas period. The tracks were released as a double A-side single as Fuller and Beckham did not agree on which direction the album should take. The disagreement would be mediated in the first instance by the viewers of Top of the Pops, who would be given the opportunity to watch the videos to both songs and vote for their favorite, and Beckham would perform the winner song on the following week on the show. "This Groove" received more votes, becoming the winner. "Let Your Head Go"/"This Groove" remains Beckham's last single release to date, as she was eventually dismissed from Telstar when the company became bankrupt, and decided to give up music to focus on her fashion career. The decision was spurred by the media panning her hip hop-influenced work. The songs were eventually included on the video album The 'Réal' Beckhams (2004).

== Composition ==
"Let Your Head Go" was written and produced by Klas Baggstrom, Liz Winstanley and Roger Olsson, with Mike Gray and Jon Pearn also serving as producers. Gray and Pearn also served as engineers in collaboration with Dan Frampton, and played all additional instruments on the track at Sultra Studios in New York City; James Winchester played the bass and guitar. It was mixed by David Snell, who also provided additional engineering, and mastered by Walter Coelho at Masterpiece.

Musically, "Let Your Head Go" is a dance-pop and electro-pop influenced pop, dance and R&B song. According to Racked's Rebecca Jennings, Beckham "does her best imitation of Kylie Minogue" on the song; Andy White of The Independent also agreed, describing it as "a synthy, electro-pop number that calls to mind 'Can't Get You Out of My Head'-era Kylie and vintage Cyndi Lauper". Similarly, Jon O'Brien from Billboard thought that the song was the "kind of irresistible dance-pop that resurrected Kylie Minogue's career just a few years prior". For his part, Justin Myers of the Official Charts Company wrote that "Let Your Head Go" was a "dancey number". According to David Sinclair in the book Spice Girls Revisited: How The Spice Girls Reinvented Pop (2008), the track had an upbeat Europop feel and "boasted a tune with something of the Kylies about it"; he also noted the "stunning banality" of the lyrics, which find Beckham singing, "And when it feels so good / I can almost lose my mind / Ooh, it makes me crazy, every time".

== Reception ==
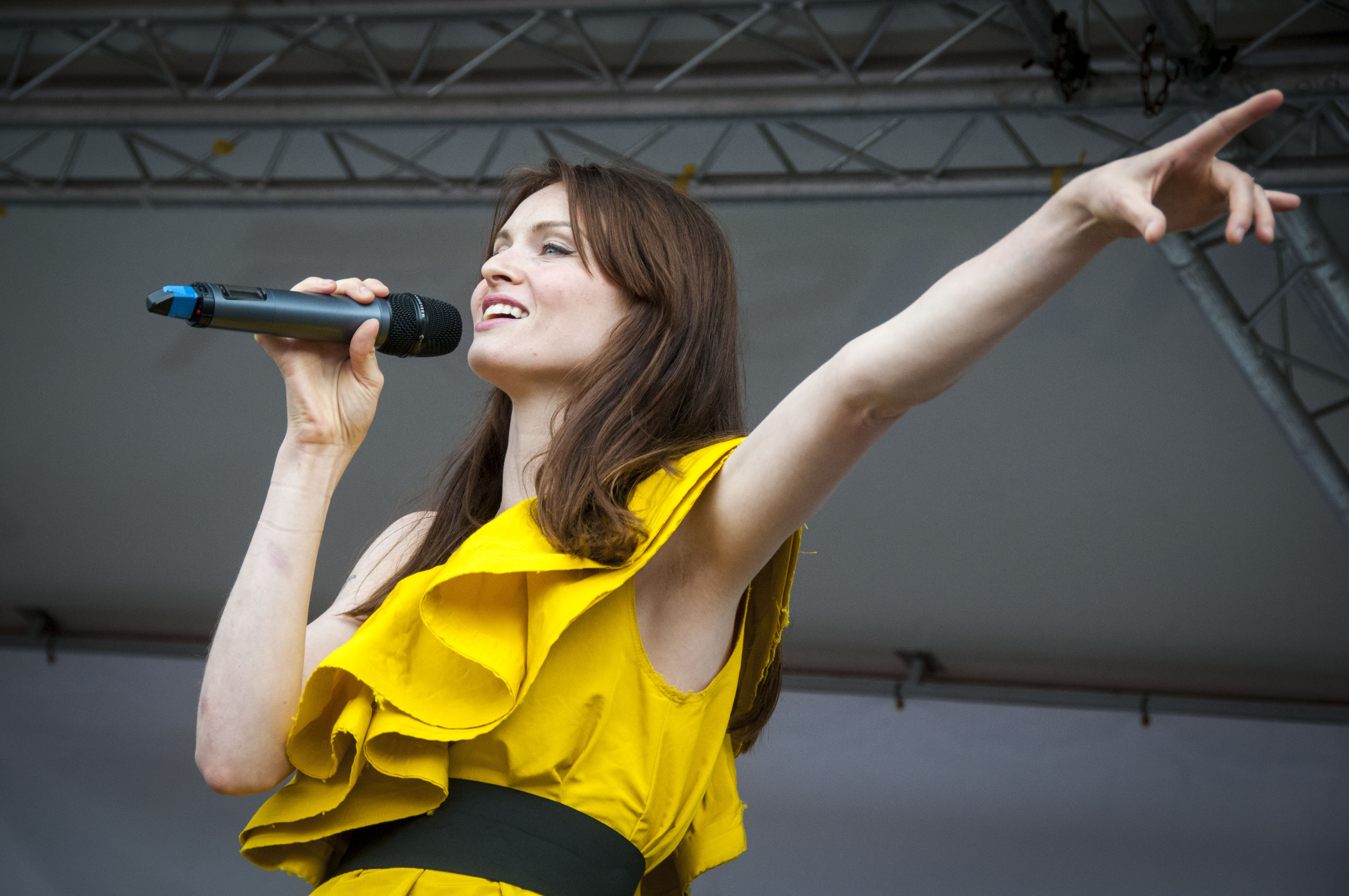
"Let Your Head Go"/"This Groove" faced a chart battle with Sophie Ellis-Bextor's (pictured) single "I Won't Change You" in the United Kingdom

"Let Your Head Go" was met with positive reviews from music critics. According to The Independent's White, the song is "among the best ever solo Spice Girls songs". Heart staff wrote that Beckham "embraced her pop credentials" on the track. For O'Brien of Billboard, it "turned out to be her finest hour", mentioning that it was "just a shame she only found her sound when it was too late" with the material, referencing the fact that Beckham abandoned her music career shortly upon its release. In the same vein, Myers from the Official Charts Company thought the track was "a pretty good way to end [her] pop career". Digital Spy's Robert Copsey agreed, saying, "Victoria's short-lived solo career went out with a bang". The staff of Hollywood.com commented that "swansong 'Let Your Head Go' restored a bit of dignity" compared to her previous solo works. Music Week staff described both "Let Your Head Go" and "This Groove" as "inoffensive pop/dance/R&B hybrids, treated to an ultra-sleek production that makes the most of her vocal proficiency".

In the UK, "Let Your Head Go"/"This Groove" faced competition with Sophie Ellis-Bextor's "I Won't Change You"; they were previously involved in a much publicised chart battle in 2000, when their singles were also released in the same week. (Note: In August 2000, Beckham's single "Out of Your Mind" faced a chart battle with Ellis-Bextor's "Groovejet (If This Ain't Love)", being dubbed "Posh vs. Posher" by the tabloids; Ellis-Bextor eventually kept Beckham off the top spot at the time.) Beckham's single entered the UK Singles Chart at number three on the week ending on 4 January 2004, behind Michael Andrews and Gary Jules' "Mad World", and Ozzy and Kelly Osbourne's "Changes", despite weeks of intense publicity prior to its release, selling 29,505 copies; Ellis-Bextor's song entered at number nine. It remained on the charts for eight weeks, and became the 88th best-selling single of 2004 in the region. It peaked at number 36 on the UK Airplay Charts on 24 January 2004. In April 2014, the Official Charts Company revealed that the single was Beckham's third biggest selling solo single in the region, out of four singles, with a total of 69,000 copies sold. In other parts of Europe, the release experienced polarised success, reaching the top three in Scotland, and number 17 in Ireland. It also reached number 91 in Romania. Across the pan-European Hot 100 Singles, "Let Your Head Go"/"This Groove" peaked at number 10.

== Music video ==
An accompanying music video was directed by Scott Lyon. It was filmed in two days, back to back with the video for "This Groove"; Beckham explained that the visuals were attached to one another, with the "Let Your Head Go" clip being described as a "piss-taker" by her. In 2004, the visual was included on the video album The 'Réal' Beckhams.

=== Synopsis ===
The video begins with Beckham finishing the filming for the video for "This Groove". She is shown shouting and pushing through people. She enters her dressing room, but a clothes hanger causes her to go wild and she starts tearing the clothes on a clothing rack, before using it to destroy a bouquet of flowers, a reference to Joan Crawford in Mommie Dearest (1981). She is then featured in two dream sequences, once as fragile in the wake of the aforementioned breakdown, being heavily photographed by paparazzi as she is escorted by psychologists, and once again in the same outfit being ignored by paparazzi, signaling that she is no longer relevant. Beckham wakes from the nightmare and is seen attempting to grab from a box a cross with the letters OBE in neon lights. She is then seen having hair and makeup done and posing in the mirror, including her famous point gesture. The singer is later seen on a throne, giving orders and watching dancers, as she plays with a crown. Beckham walks between the dancers, sets the crown on the floor, walks back to the throne, and the abbreviation "VB" is seen, with her fingers making the letter V.

=== Reception ===
Compsey from Digital Spy noted that the video "proved she can laugh at herself". In the same vein, Billboard's O'Brien deemed it a "inspired satirical video" which "proved that, despite her deadly serious image, Posh Spice certainly wasn't averse to poking fun at herself". Myers of Official Charts Company felt that the clip "showed Victoria sending up her fashionista diva image to great effect." Ben Kelly of Attitude said that the material "raises the stakes as she raves it out in a maniacal flower-chopping scene which gives way to the most pouty section in a music video ever". Sinclair wrote in Spice Girls Revisited: How The Spice Girls Reinvented Pop that the video's humour was a key element in Fuller's strategy for rebuilding Beckham's image, as it was "a powerful way of countering the perception that she was vain and too full of herself". On the UK TV Airplay Chart, Let Your Head Go peaked at number 7 on 03 January 2004.

== Track listings ==
- UK CD1
1. "This Groove" (radio mix) – 3:36
2. "Let Your Head Go" (radio mix) – 3:41
- UK CD2
1. "Let Your Head Go" (Jakatta Remix) – 7:20
2. "This Groove" (Para-Beats Remix) – 4:36
3. "Let Your Head Go" (radio mix) – 3:41
4. "This Groove" (radio mix) – 3:36

== Credits and personnel ==
Credits and personnel adapted from the CD single's liner notes.

- Victoria Beckham – vocals
- Klas Baggstrom – songwriting, production
- Liz Winstanley – songwriting, production
- Roger Olsson – songwriting, production
- Michael Gray – production, engineer, all additional instruments
- Jon Pearn – production, engineer, all additional instruments
- Dan Frampton – engineer
- James Winchester – bass, guitar
- David Snell – mixing
- Walter Coelho – mastering

== Charts ==
=== Weekly charts ===
Weekly chart performance for "Let Your Head Go"/"This Groove"
Chart (2004)	Peak position
Europe (Eurochart Hot 100)	10
Ireland (IRMA)	17
Romania (Romanian Top 100)	91
Scotland Singles (OCC)	3
UK Singles (OCC)	3

=== Year-end chart ===
Year-end chart performance for "Let Your Head Go"/"This Groove"
Chart (2004)	Position
UK Singles (OCC)	88
