= Brooklyn Beckham =

English media personality (born 1999)

- Beckham in 2026
- Born: Brooklyn Joseph Beckham; 4 March 1999 (age 27); Westminster, London, England
- Spouse: Nicola Peltz (m. 2022)
- Parents: David Beckham (father); Victoria Beckham (mother)
- Relatives: Romeo Beckham (brother); Cruz Beckham (brother)

Brooklyn Joseph Peltz Beckham (né Beckham; born 4 March 1999) is the eldest child of former professional footballer David Beckham and fashion designer and former Spice Girls member Victoria Beckham.

== Early life ==
Brooklyn Joseph Beckham was born on 4 March 1999 at the Portland Hospital in London, the first child of Victoria (née Adams) and David Beckham. It has been reported that he was named Brooklyn because Victoria found out about her pregnancy in Brooklyn, New York. However, according to his mother's 2001 autobiography, Learning to Fly, she and her husband simply liked the name. His mother recalled that it was only after choosing the name they "realised how appropriate it was because it was in New York that she found out she was pregnant and where David came after the World Cup".

Beckham spent his childhood in Madrid and Los Angeles, while his father played for Real Madrid and LA Galaxy. He has three younger siblings: brothers Romeo and Cruz, and sister Harper. In December 2004, Brooklyn and Romeo were jointly baptised in a private chapel on the grounds of their parents' Hertfordshire mansion. His godparents are Elton John, David Furnish and Elizabeth Hurley.

At the age of 15, Beckham worked weekend shifts at a coffee shop in west London. He played in the Arsenal F.C. Academy, but left in 2015 after not receiving a scholarship.

== Career ==
=== Modelling ===
Beckham began modeling professionally in 2014, and has appeared in editorials and on covers for Vogue China, Miss Vogue, Interview, L'Uomo Vogue, T:The New York Times Style Magazine and Dazed Korea. He has been photographed by Bruce Weber, Terry Richardson, Daniel Jackson and Alasdair McLellan.

Beckham has been a brand ambassador for Huawei and its Honor 8 smartphones alongside Scarlett Johansson, Karlie Kloss and Henry Cavill. He was a brand ambassador for Superdry in 2021.

=== Photography ===
In 2016, at the age of 16, Beckham photographed a campaign for Burberry BRIT, with models Ben Rees, Carvell Conduah, Eliza Thomas, Liv Mason Pearson and Maddie Demaine. Beckham's hiring for the campaign was criticised by several prominent photographers. Chris Floyd called Burberry's decision to employ Beckham a "devaluation of photography" and "sheer nepotism", while fashion photographer Jon Gorrigan called it an example of "a bit of injustice in a lot of areas" of the industry.

In 2017, Beckham began a photography degree at Parsons School of Design at the New School in New York. He failed to complete the first year of the four-year course and subsequently abandoned his degree. Beckham's first book of photography, titled What I See, was published in June 2017. Critical reactions were negative. A handful of leaked photographs became the focus of ridicule on Twitter, with users lampooning the "terrible photographs and even worse captions". Random House, Beckham's publisher, defended the book as reflecting the interests of his teenage fan base. In 2019, Beckham interned for British photographer Rankin.

=== Cooking ===
In 2022, he published an online video series Cookin' With Brooklyn. The show was criticised for taking 62 professionals to create each episode, at a reported cost of $100,000 per episode, and Beckham's lack of professional experience or training.

== Personal life ==
=== Relationships and marriage ===
Beckham was in an on-and-off-again relationship with American actress Chloë Grace Moretz starting in 2014. He attended the 2016 Democratic National Convention with Moretz in support of Hillary Clinton. Moretz confirmed in 2018 that their relationship had ended.

Beckham has also dated French-Tunisian model-singer Sonia Ben Ammar, Canadian model Lexi Wood, singer Madison Beer, dancer Lexy Panterra, English model Lottie Moss, model Phoebe Torrance, English singer Rita Ora, and English model Hana Cross.

After confirming their relationship on Instagram in January 2020, Beckham announced his engagement to Nicola Peltz on 11 July 2020. The couple married on 9 April 2022 in Palm Beach, Florida, in a Jewish ceremony. Beckham has a line from the Hebrew version of the Song of Songs tattooed on his left arm: "I am my beloved's and my beloved is mine".

=== Family estrangement ===
In January 2026, Beckham publicly confirmed that he had become estranged from his family, and had told his parents to contact him only through lawyers. He said he did not wish to reconcile with his family, alleging that they had tried to "ruin" his relationship with Peltz and had contributed to negative press coverage about him. In particular, he claimed that his mother had hijacked the first dance at his wedding and then danced on him "inappropriately", and had pulled out of making Peltz's dress at the eleventh hour, leaving her to find a dress elsewhere. He also stated that his family contained "inauthentic relationships".
