= Come Together (disambiguation) =

"Come Together" is a 1969 song by The Beatles.

Come Together may also refer to:

== Film and television ==
- Come Together (film), a 1971 film directed by Saul Swimmer
- Come Together, a 2001 Canadian film by Jeff Macpherson
- Come Together: A Fashion Picture in Motion, a 2016 short film by Wes Anderson
- Come, Together, a 2016 South Korean film
- Come Together: A Night for John Lennon's Words and Music, a 2001 television program

== Music ==
- Come Together Music Festival, in Sydney, Australia
- Come Together, the slogan of the Eurovision Song Contest 2016

=== Albums ===
- Come Together (Ike & Tina Turner album), 1970
- Come Together (Third Day album), 2001
- Come Together: America Salutes the Beatles, a tribute album, 1995
- Come Together (EP), by Killing Floor, 1998
- Come Together, an unreleased album by Victoria Beckham
- Come Together: A Musical Experience in Love, by Jimmy and Carol Owens, 1972

=== Songs ===
- "Come Together" (Primal Scream song), 1990
- "Come Together", by Annie from Anniemal
- "Come Together", by Blur from Leisure
- "Come Together", by Chris Brown from Indigo
- "Come Together", by Demi Lovato from Holy Fvck
- "Come Together", by Echosmith from Talking Dreams
- "Come Together", by The Isley Brothers from Spend the Night
- "Come Together", by MC5 from Kick Out the Jams
- "Come Together", by Move from Synergy
- "Come Together", by Ongaku Gatas
- "Come Together", by Pnau from Pnau
- "Come Together", by Spiritualized from Ladies and Gentlemen We Are Floating in Space
- "Come2gether", by Crystal Method from the compilation album Mortal Kombat: More Kombat

== Other ==
- "Come Together", a storyline in the science fiction comedy webtoon series Live with Yourself!

== See also ==
- Coming Together
