= Cruz Beckham =

- Born: Cruz David Beckham; 20 February 2005 (age 21); Madrid, Spain
- Occupations: Singer, songwriter
- Instruments: Vocals, guitar
- Years active: 2016–present
- Label: Republic Records

Cruz David Beckham (born 20 February 2005) is a Spanish-born British singer and musician, best known as the youngest son of former England footballer David Beckham and fashion designer and former Spice Girls singer, Victoria Beckham.

Beckham released his first single "If Every Day Was Christmas" in December 2016 as a charity track to benefit Global's Make Some Noise.

In February 2026, Beckham announced his first tour with his band The Breakers, following it up with the single "For Your Love".

In June 2026 Beckham announced his debut EP Wear & Tear, which was released on 21 August 2026.

== Early life ==
Cruz Beckham was born on 20 February 2005 in Madrid, Spain, during the period when his father was playing for Real Madrid. He is the youngest son of former professional footballer David Beckham and fashion designer and former Spice Girls member Victoria Beckham. He has three siblings: Brooklyn, Romeo, and Harper. He spent his early years in Los Angeles, where he lived until the age of six; after that the family returned to London. He attended Brentwood School in Essex before moving to Wetherby School in London and, then, Millfield School in Street, Somerset. From an early age, Beckham showed a strong interest in music and performing.

== Career ==
=== 2016: Debut ===
Beckham released his first single, If Every Day Was Christmas, in December 2016 when he was 11 years old. The track premiered on Capital FM's breakfast show with all proceeds donated to the charity Global's Make Some Noise. The early debut received mixed reactions from the public.

=== 2024-present: Cruz Beckham and the Breakers ===
In October 2025, Beckham released the double A-side single "Optics" and "Lick The Toad" showing a shift toward a more organic, guitar driven sound influenced by indie and rock styles. During this time he began collaborating closely with other musicians, refining his song writing and stage presence. A big influence on his music around this time was his girlfriend, Jackie Apostel, a Brazilian-German songwriter and producer. Beckham and his band The Breakers performed at numerous intimate venues across London and the UK.

In early 2026, Cruz Beckham and the Breakers announced the first leg of their debut tour, beginning in February 2026, with performances in cities including Birmingham, Manchester, London, Glasgow, Paris, Amsterdam and Berlin. In interviews and public appearances Beckham has expressed his desire to connect with listeners and bring joy through his music. On 13 February 2026, Beckham released the single "For Your Love", which peaked at number 62 on the UK Singles Downloads Chart.

In March 2026, Beckham and the Breakers announced the US leg of their For Your Love Tour.

On 31 March, Beckham announced his next single “Waste Your Pain”. It was released on 10 April alongside a music video inspired by the 1983 film Risky Business. A month later he would release "Yeah Yeah Yeah" as his new single on 22 May.

In June, Beckham teased his debut extended play, Wear & Tear. The extended play's title track released as the lead single on 26 June 2026.

== Personal life ==
Since 2024, Beckham has been in a relationship with Jackie Apostel, who is nine years his senior.

== Discography ==
=== Extended plays ===
List of EPs, with selected details
Title	Details
Wear & Tear	Released: 21 August 2026; Label: Republic

=== Singles ===
List of singles as lead artist, showing year released and originating album
Title	Year	Peak chart positions			Album
Title	Year	UK Digital	UK Indie	UK Physical	Album
"If Every Day Was Christmas"	2016	57	31	–	Non-album singles
"Optics"	2025	–	–	79	Non-album singles
"Lick the Toad"	2025	–	–	–	Non-album singles
"For Your Love"	2026	62	–	–	Non-album singles
"Waste Your Pain"	2026	–	–	–	Non-album singles
"Yeah Yeah Yeah"	2026	–	–	–	Non-album singles
"Wear & Tear"	2026	–	–	–	Wear & Tear
"Seeing Red"	2026	–	–	–	Wear & Tear
