= Romeo Beckham =

English model and footballer (born 2002)

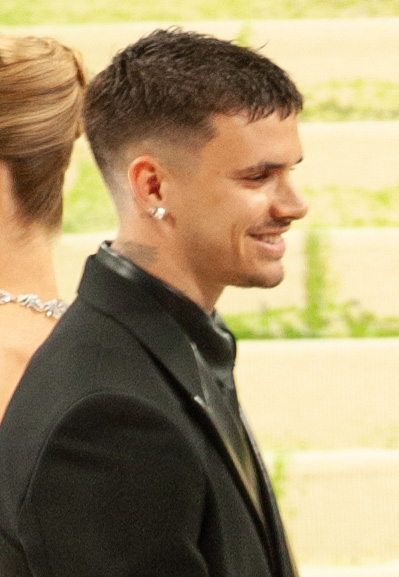
- Beckham at the 2026 Met Gala

Personal information
- Full name: Romeo James Beckham
- Date of birth: 1 September 2002 (age 24)
- Place of birth: London, England
- Height: 1.85 m (6 ft 1 in)
- Position: Forward

Youth career
- 2014–2015: Arsenal
- 2021–2023: Inter Miami

Senior career*
Years	Team	Apps	(Gls)
2021–2023	Inter Miami II (Note: Fort Lauderdale CF changed its name to Inter Miami CF II in 2022.)	26	(2)
2023	→ Brentford (loan)	0	(0)
2023–2024	Brentford	0	(0)
Total		26	(2)
- * Club domestic league appearances and goals

Romeo James Beckham (born 1 September 2002) is an English model and former footballer.

He is the second son of former footballer David Beckham and former Spice Girls member Victoria Beckham.

== Early life ==
Romeo James Beckham was born on 1 September 2002 at Portland Hospital in the City of Westminster, London. He is the son of the former England international captain David Beckham and the singer-turned-fashion designer Victoria Beckham. His brothers, Brooklyn and Cruz, also played football with him for Arsenal, but all three were eventually released from the club's youth system. He remains an Arsenal supporter. He attended Brentwood School in Essex before moving to Wetherby School in London and, then, Millfield School in Street, Somerset.

== Career ==
=== Modelling ===
Beckham was the face of the Burberry children's line at the age of 10 years old. He walked the runway for Versace at the 2025 Milan Fashion Week.

=== Arsenal Academy ===
In 2014, Beckham joined Arsenal Academy but was released the following year. After his release, he admitted that he no longer wished to pursue a career in football, instead taking up tennis training with Andy Murray. However, in 2020, Beckham announced that he was looking to return to football after a five-year absence. In support of the decision, his father replaced the tennis court he had previously built at the family home with a football pitch.

=== Club career ===
In September 2021, after turning 19, Beckham joined USL League One club Fort Lauderdale CF (renamed Inter Miami II in 2022), the reserve affiliate of his father's Major League Soccer club Inter Miami. This came after he had been seen training with the Inter Miami team in February. On 19 September, Beckham made his professional debut in a 2–2 draw against Tormenta FC. In that match, he appeared alongside Harvey Neville, the son of his father's former Manchester United teammate Phil Neville. On 26 January 2022, Beckham made his non-competitive senior debut for Inter Miami during a 4–0 pre-season win against Club Universitario de Deportes.

In October 2022, Beckham began training in England with Brentford B, who he joined in January 2023 on a six-month loan. He made his debut four days later, coming on as a second-half sub in a London Senior Cup game against Erith & Belvedere at Park View Road. He scored his first goal on 14 February 2023, in a Middlesex Senior Cup game against Wealdstone, scoring a 93rd minute winning goal in a 3-2 victory. In May 2023, Beckham was part of the Brentford B squad that won the 2022–23 Premier League Cup, although he was an unused substitute in the cup final. He made 15 appearances for Brentford B during the 2022–23 season. At the conclusion of his loan, he signed a permanent one-year contract with Brentford B.

=== Acting ===
In June 2026, Studiocanal announced that Beckham would make his acting debut in the French gay romance film Forty Love, directed by fashion photographer Pierre-Ange Carlotti. The film will premiere in France on 25 November 2026.

== Personal life ==
From 2019 to 2024, Beckham was in a relationship with model Mia Regan.

== Career statistics ==
As of match played 19 September 2022

Appearances and goals by club, season and competition
Club	Season	League			National Cup		Other		Total	
Club	Season	Division	Apps	Goals	Apps	Goals	Apps	Goals	Apps	Goals
Inter Miami CF II	2021	USL League One	6	0	—		—		6	0
Inter Miami CF II	2022	MLS Next Pro	20	2	—		—		20	2
Inter Miami CF II	Total		26	2	0	0	0	0	26	2
Career total			26	2	0	0	0	0	26	2
