= Portland Hospital =

English private maternity hospital

- Hospital Corporation of America
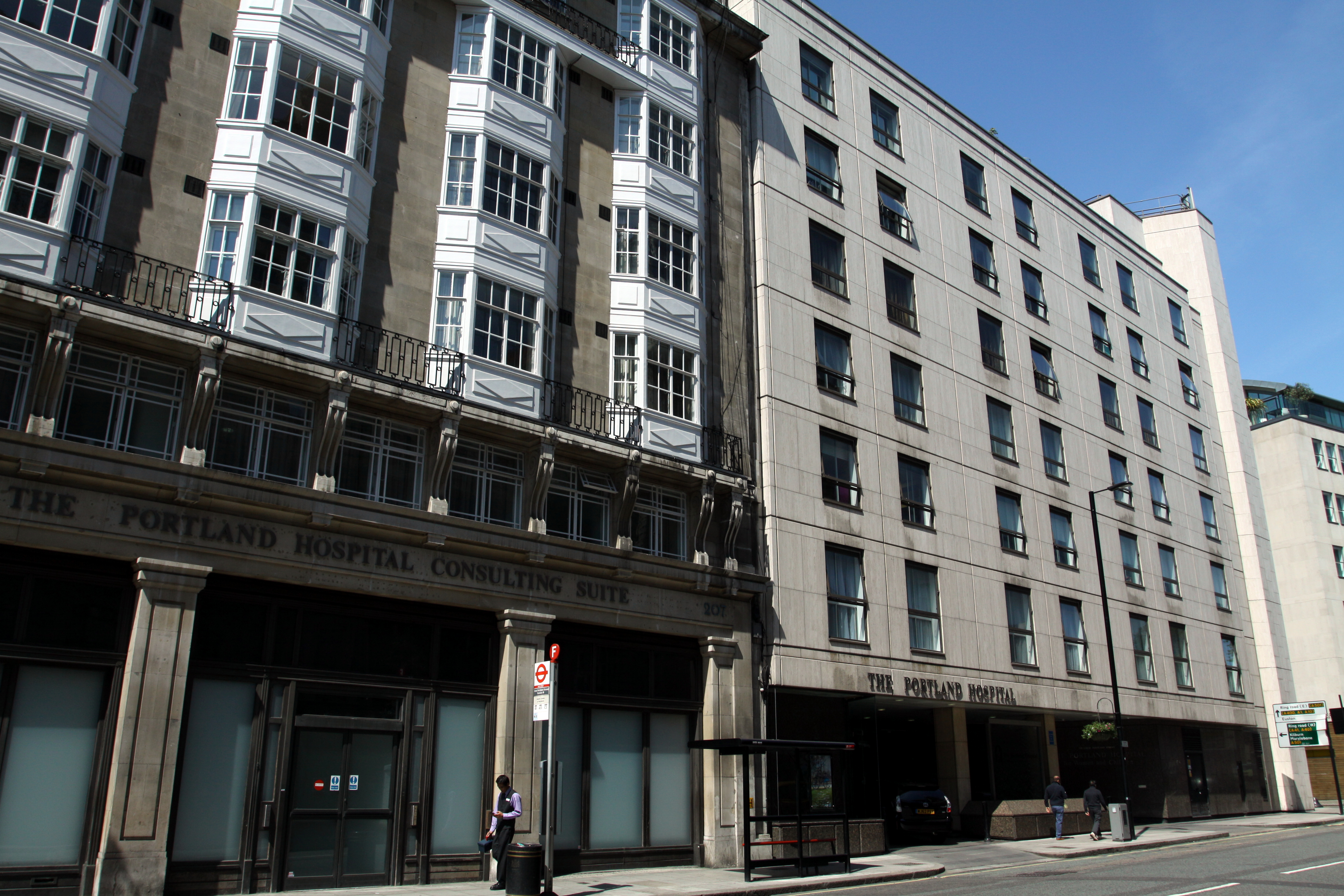
- Portland Hospital from Great Portland Street

- Shown in Westminster

Geography
- Location: Fitzrovia, London, England
- Coordinates: 51.5227°N 0.1436°W

Organisation
- Care system: Hospital Corporation of America

History
- Founded: 1983; 43 years ago

Links
- Website: www.theportlandhospital.com
- Lists: Hospitals in England

The Portland Hospital for Women and Children is a private maternity hospital on Great Portland Street, City of Westminster, London, England, owned by the Hospital Corporation of America.

== History ==
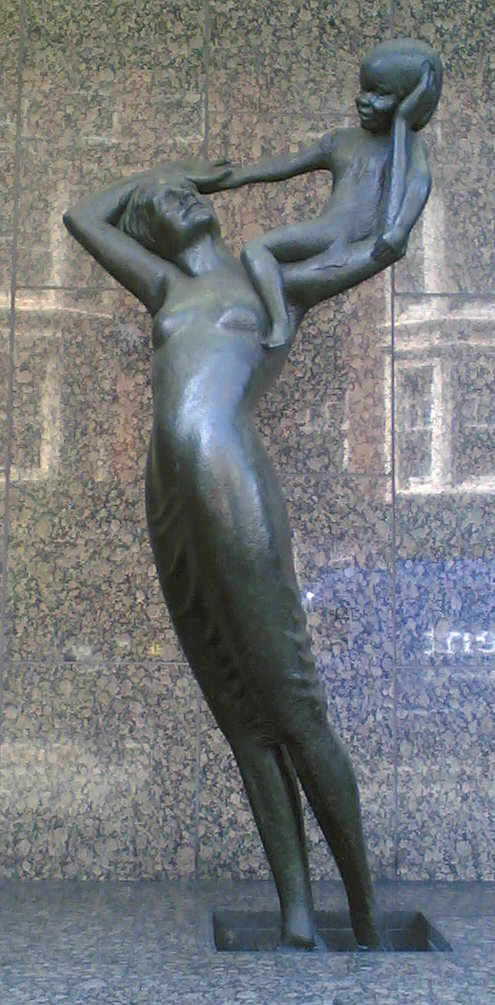
A statue by David Norris outside the Portland Hospital

The Portland was conceived by Barry Lewis, a paediatrician, who perceived a need for London to have a private hospital for women and children: it opened in 1983. It markets its services on an international basis and in 2015 about 25% of its earnings came from overseas patients.

In 2015, the hospital secured planning approval for a new link bridge which would enable it to expand its specialist children's hospital within an adjacent building.

It was described as a ‘5-star hotel for some very sick patients’ at an employment tribunal in 2022.

== Deaths of mothers ==
=== Death of Laura Touche ===
In February 1999, Laura Touche was admitted to deliver twins. On 6 February, Touche reported severe headache pain after a caesarean section to Portland staff, but her rising blood pressure was not checked for two and a half hours. According to normal protocol in the NHS, hospital staff should have checked Touche's blood pressure every 20 minutes to safeguard against brain haemorrhage, but the Portland lacked any protocol for checking vital signs. Touche subsequently suffered a brain haemorrhage, fell into a coma, and sustained brain damage. She was transferred to the Middlesex hospital and then to the National Hospital for Neurology and Neurosurgery at Queen's Square, where she died on 15 February.

In April 2012, an inquest jury concluded that Laura Touche was a victim of neglect. Portland midwife, Grace Bartholomew, admitted it was "inexcusable" that routine checks were not carried out on her shift. The hospital was investigated after Bartholomew was banned indefinitely from practising as a nurse or midwife after being found guilty of misconduct. The inquest jury also heard that it was commonplace for staff to search frantically for medication and that it took 35 minutes to find the medicine Touche required.

Touche's husband, the English film producer Peter Touche, said his wife's death was "completely avoidable" and that "the picture is far bleaker than I had imagined and the catalogue of errors is just unbelievable." Touche pointed to a lack of basic medical attention and record keeping, delays in administering drugs, and accused the hospital of a cover-up.

In 2002, Peter Touche revealed that in the wake of his wife's death, the hospital threatened him with legal action if the hospital's bill was not paid. The Touche family settled out of court with the Portland, which admitted to a breach in its duty of care.

=== Investigation into maternal mortality rates ===
In August 2000, an investigation by The Observer revealed that maternal mortality rates in private hospitals were five times higher than the national average. The paper reported that five mothers had died during or after childbirth at the Portland since the hospital's opening.

The hospital's death rate from post-partum haemorrhage was 20 times higher than the national average. In response to The Observer's findings, the then-deputy general secretary to the Royal College of Midwives, Louise Silverton, said:

I am absolutely shocked and appalled. We know the hospital has a problem in retaining midwives and uses a lot of agency staff. Serious questions need to be asked about what medical support the Portland is providing in case an emergency occurs during labour.

=== Death of Tracey Sampson ===
In April 2002, Tracey Sampson died of acute heart failure after a caesarean section at Portland Hospital. Consultant anaesthetist Kenneth MacLeod was accused of serious professional misconduct for not reintubating Sampson and waiting 90 minutes before administering further anaesthetic. An inquest concluded that Sampson's death pertained to an "unknown cause, possibly related to (a) general anaesthetic." In April 2012, Dr Kenneth MacLeod was cleared of failing his patient and serious professional misconduct, but was found guilty of other failings, mostly pertaining to record keeping.

== Deaths of children ==
=== James Dwerryhouse ===
On 25 August 2016 a seven-year-old boy died after his monitoring equipment was switched off by staff at the hospital. James Dwerryhouse suffered cardiac arrest and brain damage when the breathing equipment he needed to monitor sleep apnoea was switched off for nearly three hours. An investigation found further multiple failures including record keeping failures and the failure to document observations throughout the night. The family's legal team said that Portland staff had given conflicting accounts of what had happened to Dwerryhouse and have since launched legal action against HCA Healthcare UK, the owners of the Portland.

=== Jake Junior, son of footballer Jake Livermore ===
In May 2014, a newborn baby suffocated after a "catalogue of errors" were made at Portland hospital. The baby boy, named Jake Junior, was the son of Hull City footballer Jake Livermore and his partner Danielle Del-Giudice. An inquest concluded that Jake Junior's death was avoidable and could have been prevented if a caesarean section had been carried out earlier. The inquest heard that, despite signs of distress and an irregular heartbeat, staff at the Portland failed to carry out a blood test to determine if it was safe to continue delivery or if a caesarean section was appropriate. The couple's pleas for an emergency caesarean section were also ignored. During the delivery, Jake Junior suffered skull fractures and a brain haemorrhage. According to a coroner, the subsequent caesarean section was performed 90 minutes too late. Livermore and Del-Giudice claim that staff at the Portland insisted that Jake Junior was dead upon delivery, but a coroner ruled that the baby was born alive "in very poor condition." On her child's death, Del-Giudice said:

Words cannot explain what we have been through in losing a perfectly healthy child because of mistakes made by medical staff during the birth. Knowing that people who I trusted to care for me and my baby and to ensure that we were safe throughout my labour, did not pick up the warning signs that Jake Junior was in distress is hard for me to accept. [...] We have not even received any sort of apology from the consultant who is still practicing and it raises questions with us as to whether lessons are truly being learned.

In 2015, Livermore and Del-Giudice instructed their solicitors to investigate the care provided by private obstetrician Eleni Mavrides. A Serious Untoward Incident Report carried out by Portland Hospital detailed recommendations for improving future care.

== Notable births ==
The hospital is a popular choice for the births of members of the royal family and of celebrities: examples include Princesses Beatrice and Eugenie, and Prince Archie, as well as Brooklyn and Romeo Beckham.

== See also ==
- List of hospitals in England
- Lister Hospital, Chelsea
- Queen Charlotte's and Chelsea Hospital
- Samaritan Hospital for Women
- South London Hospital for Women and Children
