= Victoria Beckham: Coming to America =

- Coming to America title card
- Starring: Victoria Beckham
- Country of origin: United States

Production
- Running time: approx. 45 minutes

Original release
- Network: NBC
- Release: July 16, 2007

Victoria Beckham: Coming to America is a 2007 one-hour American TV special that featured British former Spice Girl Victoria Beckham moving to the United States where her professional soccer player husband, David Beckham, continued his career by joining the LA Galaxy of the MLS.

== Summary ==
Produced by 19 Entertainment (Simon Fuller's company that handles the careers of David and Victoria Beckham), what eventually ended up as a one-hour show on NBC was originally supposed to be six half-hour episodes shown weekly as agreed upon by Fuller and NBC months before the scheduled arrival of the Beckhams to the US. However, NBC soon cooled on the idea and unilaterally decided to move the episodes to its lower-profile sister network Bravo on basic cable. The move made Fuller irate, but he only succeeded in getting NBC to reach a compromise: the show would air as a one-hour, stand-alone broadcast on NBC on July 16, 2007, and if it managed to pull in good enough ratings, more episodes would follow. Though it won its time slot on Monday in the usually slow summer TV season, the show got a tepid 2.2 rating with 5.1 million total viewers in the US, falling well short of the numbers required to make NBC interested in ordering additional episodes.

In addition to NBC, the show also aired the same day on CTV in Canada.
