= Not Such an Innocent Girl =

2001 single by Victoria Beckham

Single by Victoria Beckham

from the album Victoria Beckham
- B-side: "In Your Dreams"
- Released: 17 September 2001
- Genre: Dance-pop; R&B
- Length: 3:16
- Label: Virgin
- Songwriters: Steve Kipner; Andrew Frampton
- Producer: Steve Kipner

Victoria Beckham singles chronology
"Out of Your Mind" (2000)	"Not Such an Innocent Girl" (2001)	"A Mind of Its Own" (2002)

Music video
- "Not Such an Innocent Girl" on YouTube

"Not Such an Innocent Girl" is a song by English singer Victoria Beckham, released as her debut solo single. It was released on 17 September 2001 as the lead single from her self-titled debut solo album. It was the United Kingdom's 163rd-best-seller of the year, peaking at number six on the UK Singles Chart. Originally recorded by American singer Willa Ford, her own version was only performed live and never officially released.

== Chart performance ==
In the United Kingdom, the single faced competition in a hugely hyped supposed 'chart battle' with Kylie Minogue's single "Can't Get You Out of My Head". On the chart date of 29 September 2001, "Not Such an Innocent Girl" debuted at number six on the UK Singles Chart with first week sales of 35,000 units, while "Can't Get You Out of My Head" debuted at number one with first week sales of 306,000 units. It became the UK's 163rd-best-seller of 2001. As of September 2021, "Not Such An Innocent Girl" has sold 93,000 copies in the UK. After renewed interest in the song in 2026, the single peaked at number one on both the UK Singles Downloads and UK Singles Sales charts, respectively.

== Music video ==
The music video has a futuristic theme and features two Victorias: one dressed in all-white with blonde hair ("the good girl"), and the other in all-black with jet black hair ("the bad girl"). The video culminates into a "dance-off" and motorcycle race between the two Victorias. The video was shot almost entirely on a green set with a significant amount of post-production.

== Track listings ==
- UK CD and cassette single
1. "Not Such an Innocent Girl" – 3:16
2. "In Your Dreams" – 3:50
3. "Not Such an Innocent Girl" (Sunship mix) – 5:15
- UK DVD single
1. Behind the scenes footage of Victoria (video) – 0:30
2. "Not Such an Innocent Girl" (video) – 3:37
3. Behind the scenes footage of Victoria (video) – 0:30
4. "Not Such an Innocent Girl" (Robbie Rivera's main mix) – 6:56
5. Behind the scenes footage of Victoria (video) – 0:30
6. "Not Such an Innocent Girl" (Sunship dub) – 5:15
7. Behind the scenes footage of Victoria (video) – 0:30
- European CD single
1. "Not Such an Innocent Girl" – 3:17
2. "In Your Dreams" – 3:50
- Australasian CD single
1. "Not Such an Innocent Girl" – 3:17
2. "In Your Dreams" – 3:52
3. "Not Such an Innocent Girl" (Sunship mix featuring M.C. RB) – 5:17
4. "Not Such an Innocent Girl" (Robbie Rivera main mix) – 6:58
5. "Not Such an Innocent Girl" (Robbie Rivera's 3AM Dark mix) – 8:11

== Charts ==
=== Weekly charts ===
Chart (2001)	Peak position
Australia (ARIA)	36
Belgium (Ultratip Bubbling Under Flanders)	14
Europe (Eurochart Hot 100)	29
Ireland (IRMA)	23
Italy (FIMI)	32
Netherlands (Dutch Top 40 Tipparade)	17
Romania (Romanian Top 100)	66
Scottish Singles Sales (Official Charts)	10
Spain (Promusicae)	15
UK Singles (Official Charts)	6

Chart (2026)	Peak position
UK Singles Sales (OCC)	1

=== Year-end charts ===
Chart (2001)	Position
UK Singles (OCC)	163

== Release history ==
Region	Date	Format(s)	Label(s)	Ref.
United Kingdom	17 September 2001	CD; cassette	Virgin	
Australia	24 September 2001	CD	Virgin	
