= A Mind of Its Own =

2002 single by Victoria Beckham

Single by Victoria Beckham

from the album Victoria Beckham
- B-side: "Always Be My Baby"; "Feels So Good"
- Released: 11 February 2002
- Genre: Pop
- Length: 3:48
- Label: Virgin
- Songwriters: Victoria Beckham; Steve Kipner; Andrew Frampton
- Producers: Steve Kipner; Andrew Frampton

Victoria Beckham singles chronology
"Not Such an Innocent Girl" (2001)	"A Mind of Its Own" (2002)	"This Groove" / "Let Your Head Go" (2003)

Music video
- "A Mind of Its Own" on YouTube

"A Mind of Its Own" is a song by British singer-songwriter Victoria Beckham from her self-titled debut solo album (2001). It was released on 11 February 2002 as the second and final single from the album and peaked at number six on the UK Singles Chart, becoming Beckham's third top-10 single. Beckham also recorded a version of the song in French, "Mon cœur n'en fait qu'à sa tête".

== Commercial performance ==
"A Mind of Its Own" debuted and peaked at number six on the UK singles chart on 17 February 2002, with first-week sales of 24,000 copies. It became Beckham's third top-10 single on the chart. The single has sold at least 56,500 copies in the United Kingdom.

== Music video ==
The video for "A Mind of Its Own" was directed by Simon Atkinson and Adam Townley. The video was released through a DVD single. It begins with Beckham walking barefoot through a forest; she is wearing a brown blouse and purple skirt. These scenes are interspaced with Beckham sitting by a waterfall. Later on, she finds an abandoned mansion which she enters; it is full of leaves and vines. In the bridge and final chorus, she is shown in one of the bedrooms of the mansion laying on a bed whilst holding a pillow and sitting on a chair; in these scenes, she is wearing a black tank top, jeans and white trainers. The video ends with Beckham looking into the camera, smiling and laughing.

== Track listings ==
- UK CD and cassette single
1. "A Mind of Its Own" – 3:48
2. "Always Be My Baby" – 3:29
3. "Feels So Good" – 3:47
- UK DVD single
1. "A Mind of Its Own" (video) – 3:48
2. "Always Be My Baby" (audio plus photo gallery) – 3:29
3. "Feels So Good" (audio plus photo gallery) – 3:47
4. Victoria 'Behind the Scenes' at the video shoot 1 – 0:30
5. Victoria 'Behind the Scenes' at the video shoot 2 – 0:30
6. Victoria 'Behind the Scenes' at the video shoot 3 – 0:30
7. Victoria 'Behind the Scenes' at the video shoot 4 – 0:30
- European CD single
1. "A Mind of Its Own" – 3:48
2. "Feels So Good" – 3:47

== Personnel ==
Personnel are adapted from the UK CD single liner notes.

- Victoria Beckham – writing
- Steve Kipner – writing, production
- Andrew Frampton – writing, production
- Mark "Spike" Stent – mixing
- Paul "P-Dub" Walton – mix engineering

== Charts ==
=== Weekly charts ===
Chart (2002)	Peak position
Europe (Eurochart Hot 100)	42
Scotland Singles (OCC)	7
UK Singles (OCC)	6

=== Year-end charts ===
Chart (2002)	Position
UK Singles (OCC)	173

== Sales ==
Region	Certification	Certified units/sales
United Kingdom	—	56,500
