= Victoria Beckham =

English fashion designer and singer (born 1974)

Victoria Beckham OBE
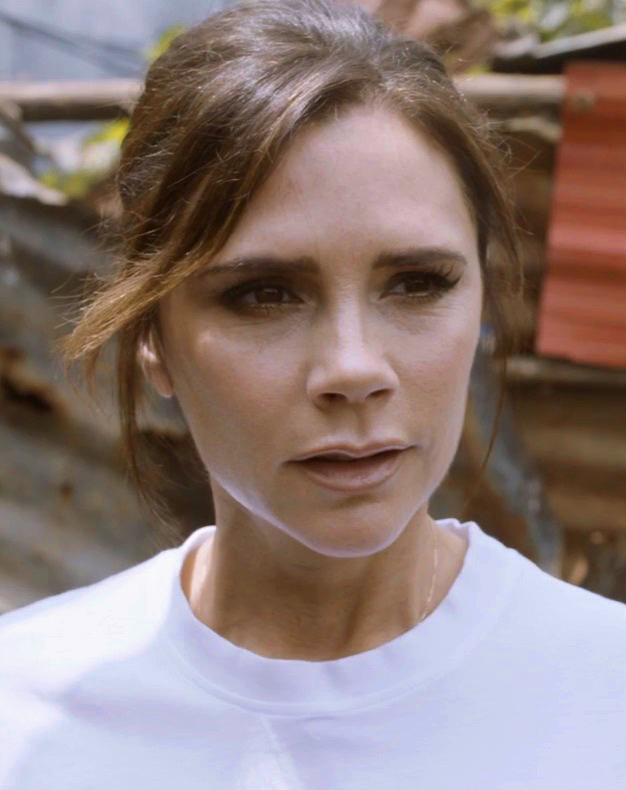
- Beckham in 2018
- Born: Victoria Caroline Adams; 17 April 1974 (age 52); Harlow, Essex, England
- Other name: Posh Spice
- Occupations: Singer; fashion designer; television personality
- Years active: 1994–present
- Spouse: David Beckham (m. 1999)
- Children: 4, including Brooklyn, Romeo and Cruz Beckham
- Musical career
- Genres: Pop; R&B
- Labels: Virgin; Telstar; 19
- Member of: Spice Girls
- Website: victoriabeckham.com

Victoria Caroline, Lady Beckham (née Adams; born 17 April 1974), is an English fashion designer, singer, and television personality. She rose to prominence in the 1990s as a member of the pop group the Spice Girls, in which she was nicknamed Posh Spice. After the Spice Girls disbanded in 2000, Beckham signed with Virgin Records to release her debut solo album Victoria Beckham, which produced two UK Top 10 singles. Beckham has also become an internationally recognised style icon and fashion designer.

Beckham has starred in seven official documentaries and reality shows, including Victoria's Secrets (2000), Being Victoria Beckham (2002), The Real Beckhams (2003), Victoria Beckham – A Mile in Their Shoes (2004), Victoria Beckham: Coming to America (2007), Beckham (2023), and the Netflix documentary Victoria Beckham (2025). She is married to former association football player David Beckham, and they have four children, including Brooklyn and Romeo. As of May 2019, the couple's joint wealth is estimated at £355 million.

Following high-profile collaborations with other brands, Beckham launched an eponymous label in 2008, and a lower-priced (diffusion) label in 2011. The Victoria Beckham label was named designer brand of the year in the UK in 2011; in 2012 the brand was assessed as the star performer in the Beckham family's business interests. Writing in the Daily Telegraph in 2011, Belinda White noted that the transition from WAG to fashion designer had been more successful than most had predicted, saying: "She has gathered a significant celebrity following and won over the scathing fashion pack who now clamour for a ticket to her bi-annual show at New York Fashion Week." Beckham was appointed Officer of the Order of the British Empire in the 2017 New Year Honours and a Chevalière de l'Ordre des Arts et des Lettres in 2026 for services to the fashion industry.

== Early life ==
Victoria Caroline Adams was born on 17 April 1974 at the Princess Alexandra Hospital in Harlow, Essex, England, and raised in Goffs Oak, Hertfordshire. She is the eldest of three children of Jacqueline Doreen (née Cannon), a former insurance clerk and hairdresser, and Anthony William Adams, who worked as an electronics engineer. They founded an electronics wholesale business which allowed a comfortable upbringing for Victoria, her sister, Louise, and her brother, Christian Adams. Her great-great-great-grandfather was German artist and revolutionary Carl Heinrich Pfänder and her great-great-great-granduncle was Minnesota politician William Pfaender.

After watching the musical film Fame in 1980, she decided to pursue a musical career. Jacqueline and Anthony Adams enrolled her at Jason Theatre School. In 1991, Beckham entered Laine Theatre Arts in Epsom, Surrey and studied dance and modelling. Beckham attended St. Mary's High School in Cheshunt, where she was embarrassed by her family's wealth and often begged her father not to drop her off outside the school in their Rolls-Royce. Eventually, she became a member of a band called Persuasion.

== Music career ==
=== 1994–2000: Spice Girls ===
Beckham auditioned for a March 1994 advertisement in The Stage which required girls who were "street smart, extrovert, ambitious and able to sing and dance". In 1994, Beckham joined the all-female group, the Spice Girls. In the recordings before her marriage, she is credited with her maiden name as Victoria Adams. The group's first single was called "Wannabe" (1996), and she worked alongside Geri Halliwell, Emma Bunton, Mel B and Melanie C. It went to number one in the United Kingdom and United States, and another 35 countries. It was followed by eight further number one singles from their albums Spice, Spiceworld and Forever. Each member of the group received a nickname from the media and Beckham was named "Posh Spice". The group is the best-selling female group of all time, selling over 80 million records worldwide. After the release of their third album, Forever, which charted at number two in the UK but was far less successful than their previous two albums, the Spice Girls stopped recording, concentrating on their solo careers in regards to their foreseeable future.

=== 2000–2002: Victoria Beckham ===
On 14 August 2000, Beckham released her first solo single, "Out of Your Mind" in collaboration with Dane Bowers and Truesteppers. The week of release coincided with the release of "Groovejet (If This Ain't Love)" by Spiller featuring Sophie Ellis-Bextor, resulting in a chart battle dubbed 'Posh vs. Posher' by the tabloids. Before the single's release, on 8 July 2000, Beckham made her public solo debut at London's Hyde Park at a concert to raise money for the Prince's Trust charity. She sang "Out of Your Mind" to a 100,000-strong audience. Beckham then signed a recording contract with her group label Virgin Records. Her next single as a solo artist, "Not Such An Innocent Girl", was released on 17 September 2001. Again, she faced competition in another hugely hyped chart battle, this time with Kylie Minogue's single "Can't Get You Out of My Head". Despite a huge promotional campaign, Beckham was outsold eight to one, and her single debuted at number 6. Beckham's eponymous debut album, which was released on 1 October 2001, reached Number 10 in the UK album chart. The album cost a reputed £5 million to produce and it sold a modest 50,000 copies.

The second and final single to be released from the album was "A Mind of Its Own" on 11 February 2002. The single reached number 6 in the UK and sold 56,500 copies. Rumours soon spread that Beckham was to be dropped by her label for not charting in the Top Three. These were strongly denied at the time. Beckham commented "You know what newspapers are like, they just like to put all the negative stuff in, but as far as I'm concerned and the record company is concerned it is all great." A third single, "I Wish", was promoted but never materialised. The single version was a remix featuring Robbie Craig, and was performed on TV on Friday Night's All Wright. Following the announcement of Beckham's second pregnancy, the single was shelved. Beckham was reportedly dropped by Virgin Records along with fellow Spice Girls Emma Bunton and Melanie B, but a statement from her publicist denied reports, stating: "No-one has been dropped. The Virgin deal has come to a natural end and both parties have decided not to continue."

=== 2002–2004: Unreleased albums and final solo releases ===
In 2002, Beckham signed a contract with Telstar Records and 19 Management worth £1.5 million. In 2002, she began recording an electropop-influenced album, tentatively titled Open Your Eyes. However, desiring a more urban sound, she began working with producer Damon Dash the following year on R&B and hip hop influenced tracks for an album tentatively titled Come Together. The Dash-produced track "It's That Simple" featuring M.O.P. premiered on radio stations in July 2003 as a promotional single, generating mixed reviews. Beckham's first single with Telstar, the double A-side "Let Your Head Go" / "This Groove", was released in the UK on 29 December 2003, utilizing one song from both projects: "Let Your Head Go" from Open Your Eyes and "This Groove" from Come Together. The release received heavy promotion and many TV appearances across the Christmas period and charted at number three in the UK. Outside of the UK, Simon Fuller reportedly had planned to market Beckham's music in the US. In April 2004, Telstar announced bankruptcy and both albums were cancelled, while Beckham, disappointed with wasted time in studio, gave up music to focus on her fashion career. The albums were never released, but have since leaked online in their entirety.

=== 2007–2012: Return of the Spice Girls ===
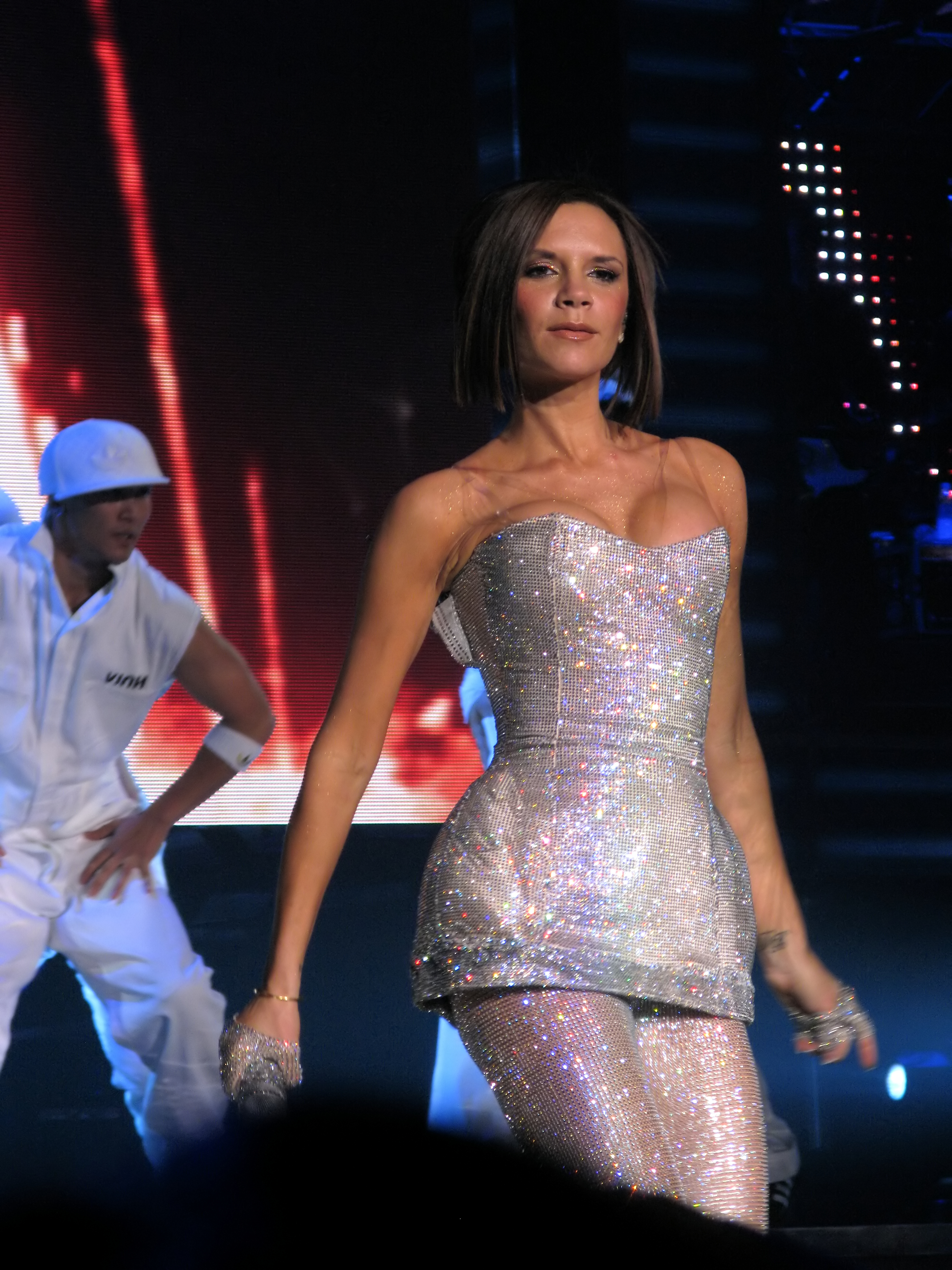
Beckham performing with the Spice Girls in Las Vegas in December 2007

In 2007, the Spice Girls reformed and announced a reunion tour, which reportedly earned them £10 million each (approximately $20 million). Beckham had previously stated that she and her former Spice colleagues were enjoying their solo careers in various fields, saying "We're all still doing our own thing." Their Greatest Hits album was released in early-November 2007 and the tour began on 2 December 2007. At its advent, Beckham said "I wanted my children to see that Mummy was a pop star. It was the last opportunity for them to stand in a crowd full of people screaming for the Spice Girls."

Film-maker Bob Smeaton directed an official film of the tour titled Spice Girls: Giving You Everything, which was first aired on Fox8 in Australia. It later aired in the UK, on 31 December 2007 on BBC One. As well as their sell-out tour, the Spice Girls were contracted to appear in Tesco advertisements, for which they were paid £1 million each.

In October 2009, reports suggested that the Spice Girls were to star in a reality show in which they would cast female actors to play their roles in a musical. The following year, Judy Craymer teamed up with the Spice Girls and Simon Fuller to start developing a Spice Girls musical titled Viva Forever!. On 26 June 2012, all five Spice Girls were in attendance at a press conference in London to promote the launch of Viva Forever! The musical opened at the West End's Piccadilly Theatre on 11 December 2012. On 12 August 2012, after much speculation, Beckham and the Spice Girls performed a medley of "Wannabe" and "Spice Up Your Life" at the 2012 Summer Olympics closing ceremony, reuniting solely for the event. Their performance was the most tweeted moment of Olympics closing ceremony with over 116,000 tweets on Twitter per minute.

The band reunited again for a 2019 tour, however Beckham opted not to participate in the reunion choosing to focus on her fashion label instead. When the American television presenter Ellen DeGeneres asked her why she chose not to join with the other Spice Girls for the reunion tour, she said "It just didn't feel like the right thing to do. I'll always be Posh Spice, always."

=== 2026: Discography resurgence ===
In January 2026, following a social media outburst from her eldest son Brooklyn, Beckham's single "Not Such An Innocent Girl" saw a 19,615% sales increase, reaching number one on both the UK Singles Downloads and UK Singles Sales charts, respectively; her single "Out of Your Mind" debuted at number 42 on the UK Singles Downloads Chart and at number 47 on the UK Singles Sales Chart; her album, Victoria Beckham debuted at number 44 on the UK Albums Downloads Chart, peaking a week later at number 38 on that chart.

== Fashion ==
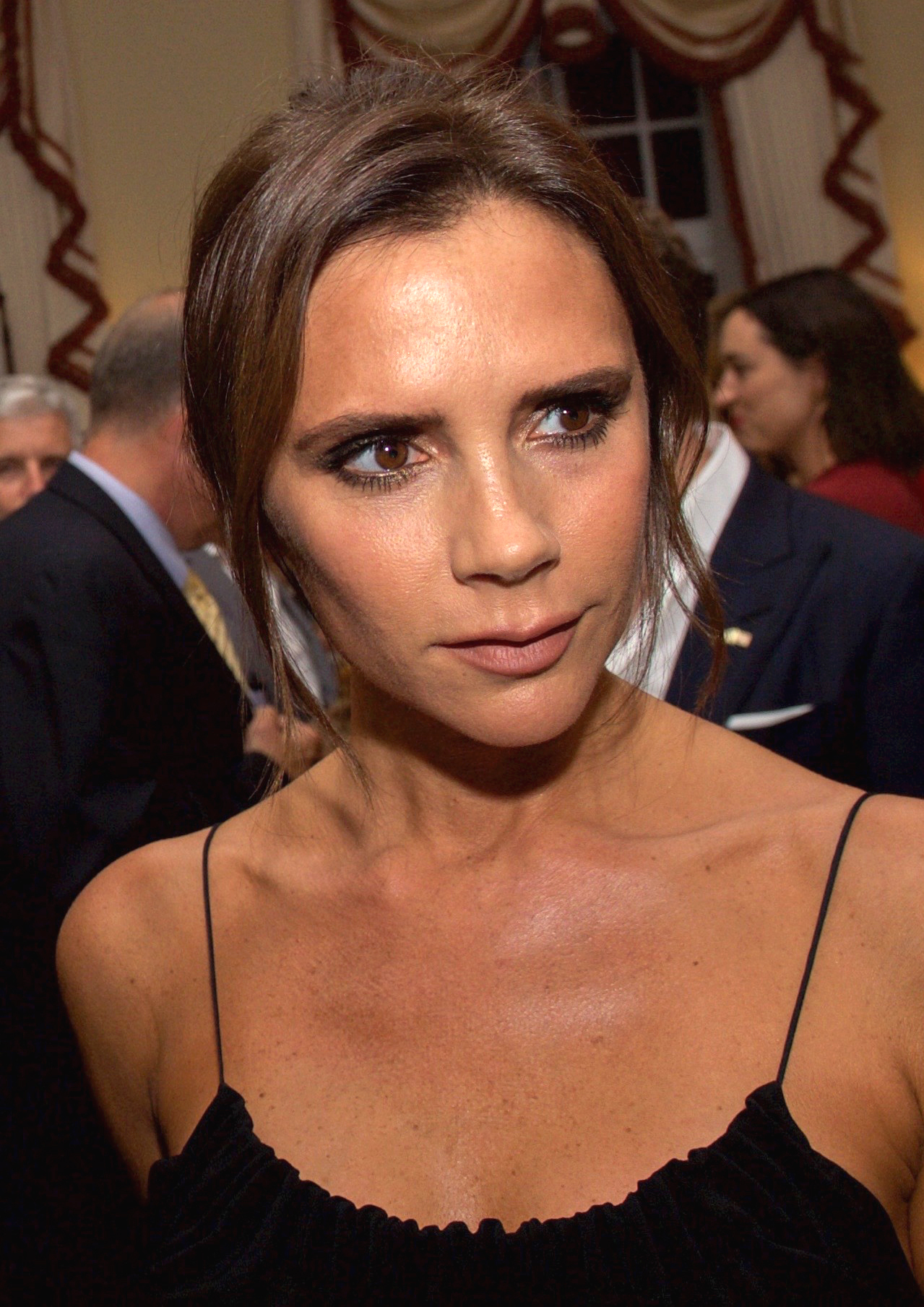
Beckham at London Fashion Week in 2015

Beckham made a guest appearance on the catwalk for Maria Grachvogel on 17 February 2000, marking her debut as a model at London Fashion Week. Beckham also acted as a British ambassador for Dolce & Gabbana and was briefly the face of Rocawear in 2003. Beckham designed a limited-edition fashion line for Rock & Republic called VB Rocks in 2004, consisting mainly of jeans for the high end of the market, retailing at approximately $300 in the US.

On 16 January 2006, Beckham walked the runway for Roberto Cavalli at Milan Fashion Week, and was for a period exclusively dressed by him for red-carpet and social events. For the March 2006 issue of Harper's Bazaar, Beckham acted as fashion editor when she styled her close friend, Katie Holmes, for a fashion shoot. She has admitted to a personal love of sunglasses, saying "I'm quite obsessed with sunglasses. I collect vintage Guccis and Carreras – they can make virtually any outfit look cool." After Beckham's departure from Rock & Republic, in September 2006, she furthered her fashion ventures by launching her own denim label, dvb Style. Beckham then launched a new official website, dvbstyle.com to promote her fashion work.

On 14 June 2007, Beckham launched dvb Denim collection in New York at Saks Fifth Avenue, along with unveiling her eyewear range in the United States for the first time. In the same month, Beckham made her first appearance at London's annual Graduate Fashion Week as a judge alongside Glenda Bailey (editor-in-chief of Harper's Bazaar) and Lanvin's Alber Elbaz, to choose the winner of the River Island Gold Award, worth £20,000. In August 2007, Intimately Beckham perfume was launched into US stores, one of more than 20 perfumes she and David Beckham have introduced over the years. In September 2007 her cosmetics line V-Sculpt was launched in Tokyo. In a 2007 appearance at an LA Galaxy press conference, Beckham is credited with having popularised Roland Mouret's 'moon dress' and his brand, and Beckham was also the face of Marc Jacobs for his Spring 2008 collection.

The fashion magazine covers Beckham has appeared on during her career include I-D in 2004 and W in 2007. Her first Vogue appearance was the April 2008 British edition. This was followed by Vogue India, Vogue Paris as well as the German, Russian, Australian, Turkish, Taiwanese, Chinese and Spanish editions. Beckham has also graced various international editions of Harper's Bazaar and Elle. On 17 July 2018, Victoria's collection of her Reebok collaboration was launched.

=== Launch of fashion label ===
Beckham's eponymous label was launched in September 2008. By 2011, it had grown into a fixture of New York Fashion Week and a lower-priced Victoria by Victoria Beckham label was introduced. In the first quarter of 2011–12, it was predicted to generate annual sales of more than £60 million. Known initially for its dresses, the range has expanded into separates and luxury handbags selling at up to £18,000. Alongside the main fashion line and diffusion range, the Victoria Beckham brand still includes separate denim, eyewear and fragrance lines. In November 2011, Victoria Beckham won Designer Brand of the Year at the British Fashion Awards.

In September 2012, Victoria Beckham was the most talked about designer on Twitter during New York Fashion Week, also acquiring 57,000 new followers during the shows according to research by The Whispr Group. Writing in The Independent in February 2014, Alexander Fury described how Victoria Beckham had made the transition from novelty to respected designer, citing her recent guest editorship of French Vogue and forthcoming participation in a panel discussion with the dean of Parsons design school in New York. The article concluded that the brand's sales were down to the appeal of the designs themselves, not the celebrity association.

In 2017, Beckham's new collection for Target featured a wide range of sizes from XS to 3X for women. Beckham also introduced a new line for children's wear. In 2018, the collection was presented at London Fashion Week instead of at New York Fashion Week as normal. In 2019, a spokesperson for the brand confirmed that the line would remain fur-free, and announced that as of the autumn/winter collection, it would also be free of any exotic skins.

=== Business difficulties ===
Despite her high social profile, her fashion brand has not been a business success. In 2018 the label was losing £4,000 a day. In November 2019, the BBC reported that "Victoria Beckham's fashion business has posted another annual loss as demand for the former Spice Girl's high end clothes "plateaued". Victoria Beckham Limited, which has not made a profit since it launched in 2008, reported a loss of £12.3m for 2018. Sales slipped 16% to £35m, amid weaker wholesale demand. Chairman Ralph Toledano said sales of clothing and accessories had levelled off after years of growth. "The performance was in line with expectations, so we were not surprised. Our goal is to reach profitability as soon as possible," he told trade journal Business of Fashion. "Mrs Beckham launched her label in 2008 with a collection of luxury dresses, and now sells fashion and accessories in more than 400 stores around the world." In 2022, Beckham's fashion label was £54 million in debt.

=== Victoria Beckham Beauty ===
In September 2019, Beckham launched the beauty brand "Victoria Beckham Beauty". Together with co-founder Sarah Creal, she showcased the brand at London Fashion Week. Secondary packaging of the makeup is made from 100% post-consumer waste, while shipping materials are either recyclable or biodegradable. Beckham has described it as "active and effective, but clean and kind". The brand's first line of products was eye makeup, and included eye liner, individual eye shadows, and an eye shadow palette. A line of lip products, comprising a lip tint and waterproof lip pencils, was released the following month.

== Television ==
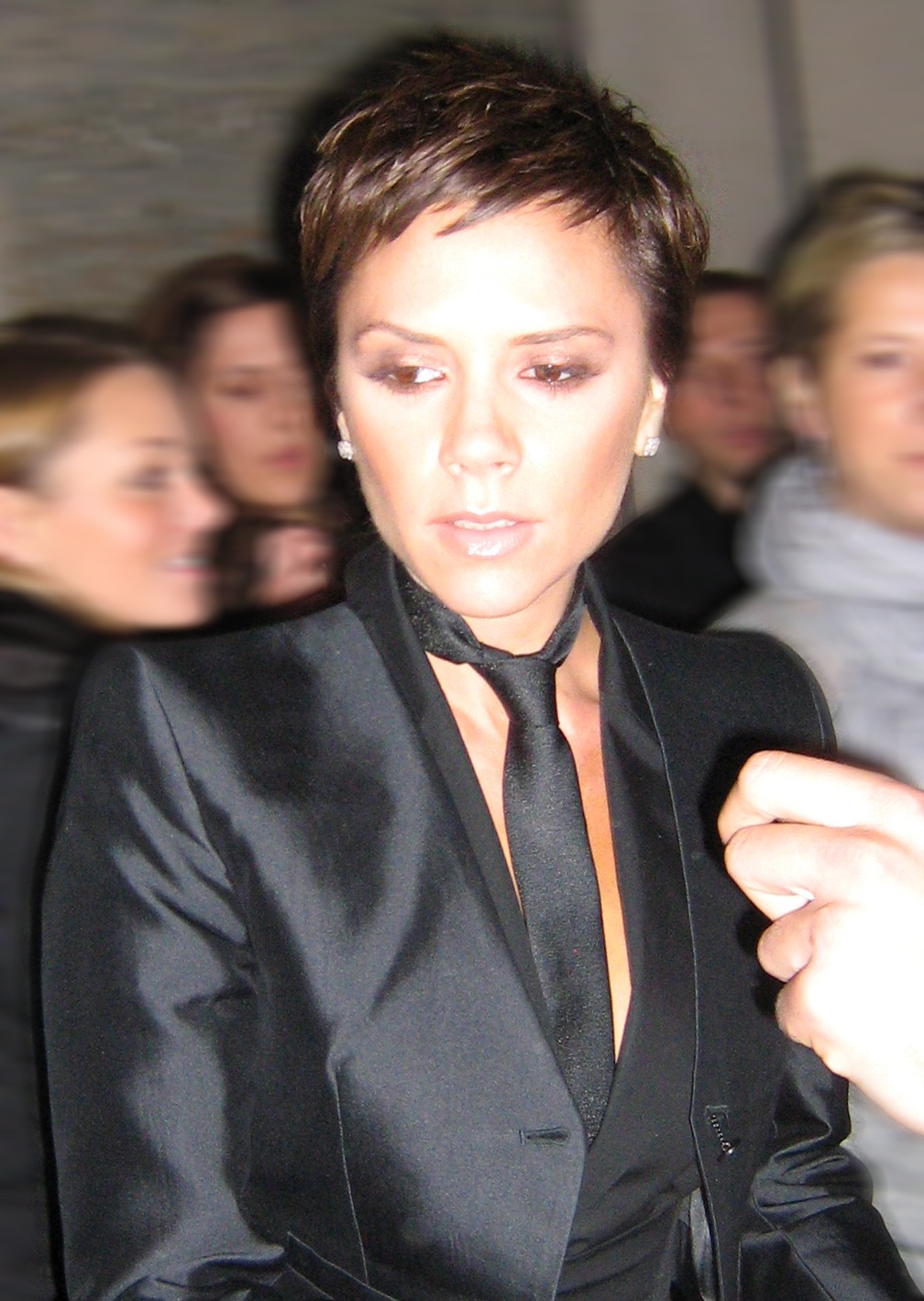
Beckham in Düsseldorf in October 2008

Beckham has shot five official documentaries. The first, dated 11 January 2000, was called Victoria's Secrets, a programme only shown in the UK on Channel 4. It involved Beckham being followed by cameras while also discussing and interviewing other British celebrities, such as Elton John. The second, Being Victoria Beckham, was broadcast in March 2002 and saw Beckham discussing her career as a solo artist with the release of her first album, and also showed her at various photo shoots and recording sessions. The documentary attracted a strong audience of 8.83 million, coming top in its timeslot. One critic described her as "so clearly level-headed, happy with her not inconsiderable lot and seemingly unfazed by the madly intrusive nature of her monumentally ridiculous fame". The third, The Real Beckhams, aired on 24 December 2003 on ITV1 and focused on the Beckhams' move to Madrid from London after David Beckham was signed to Real Madrid. In those years, she suffered a jealousy attack and had a fight in a gym with Ana Obregón because her husband David and Ana had been sending phone messages. It also featured Victoria Beckham re-launching her solo career and showed her mocking the tabloid stories she reads in the paper every day. The special received an audience of 6.10 million viewers and was later released on DVD on 2 February 2004.

The fourth was titled Full Length & Fabulous: The Beckhams' 2006 World Cup Party, and followed Victoria and David Beckham organising and making preparations to host a 2006 World Cup Party at a marquee in the grounds of their mansion in Hertfordshire, which aimed to raise money for their charity. Two tickets to attend the ball were auctioned on-line for charity, and sold for £103,000. The documentary aired on 28 May 2006 and showed the event itself, where the menu was designed, especially by friend and chef Gordon Ramsay, and the charity auction was hosted by Graham Norton. Ramsay catered for 600 guests, with the aid of 40 chefs and 100 waiting staff. The ITV documentary attracted an average of 7.56 million viewers.

To document Victoria Beckham's preparations for her family's move to the US, she signed a deal with NBC for six episodes of a half-hour unscripted reality TV series. Despite original plans for six episodes, the show was cut to a one-hour special only as there "just wasn't enough (material) for a series." The show, called Victoria Beckham: Coming to America, aired on 16 July 2007 in the US and Canada. It was heavily scrutinised by the American media and critics, with the New York Post describing it as "an orgy of self-indulgence" and also describing Beckham as "vapid and condescending". The programme was the third-most-watched programme in its time-slot and received viewing figures of 4.9 million in the US, beaten by a repeat of Wife Swap and two sitcoms. The programme aired in Britain on 17 July 2007 on ITV with 3.84 million viewers tuning in. The programme was produced by Simon Fuller who managed her and the Spice Girls on their come-back tour.

In July 2007, it was announced that Beckham would shortly begin filming a cameo appearance as herself in an episode of the second season of ABC's TV series Ugly Betty. The episode, "A Nice Day for a Posh Wedding", aired on 9 November 2007 in the United States and on 23 November in the United Kingdom. Despite her forays into television, Beckham has denied plans to embark upon a Hollywood movie career. In February 2008, it was revealed that Beckham would be the guest judge for the finale of fourth season of Project Runway, which aired on 5 March 2008 in the US.

It was reported in October 2007 that Beckham had turned down the opportunity to appear in Sex and the City: The Movie. She stated in an interview: "[I was] asked to be in the Sex and the City film, which I would have loved to have done, but because I am in full-on Spice Girls rehearsal mode, unfortunately, I can't do it." In 2010, Beckham voiced Queen Amphitrite in an episode of SpongeBob SquarePants. She said it was thrilling to get the invitation, as her children were fans of the show.

== Books ==
On 13 September 2001, Beckham released her first book, Learning to Fly. The title was taken from a line in a song from the musical Fame, which Beckham had enjoyed as a child. The verse that inspired the title was: "I'm gonna live forever, I'm gonna learn how to fly". The autobiography documents her childhood, time during the Spice Girls, her marriage and family life, as well as her career at the time.

Learning to Fly became the third best-selling non-fiction title of 2001 and the total UK sales stand at more than 500,000 copies. When the book was first released, it went to Number 1 in the book charts after four weeks of release, relegating Robbie Williams' book to second place. A high-profile guest appearance on Parkinson, watched by nine million people, helped to promote the book. Hello!, Daily Mail and The Mail on Sunday joined to buy the rights to preview and serialise the book before its publication. The figure paid was thought to be near £1 million.

Beckham was quoted by a Spanish journalist in 2005 as saying: "I've never read a book in my life". She later explained this was a mistranslation from the original Spanish in which the interview was printed, saying she actually stated that she never had time to finish reading a book because she was always too busy looking after her children.

Beckham's second book, a fashion advice guide titled That Extra Half an Inch: Hair, Heels and Everything in Between, was published on 27 October 2006. That Extra Half an Inch: Hair, Heels and Everything in Between includes tips from Beckham on fashion, style and beauty, and also contains photography by Mario Testino, Annie Leibovitz and Steven Meisel. The book became another best-seller, and has sold 400,000 copies in Britain alone since it was published in hardcover. The rights have since been sold to the United States, the Netherlands, Japan, Portugal, Lithuania, Russia, and, most recently, China.

== Power and influence ==
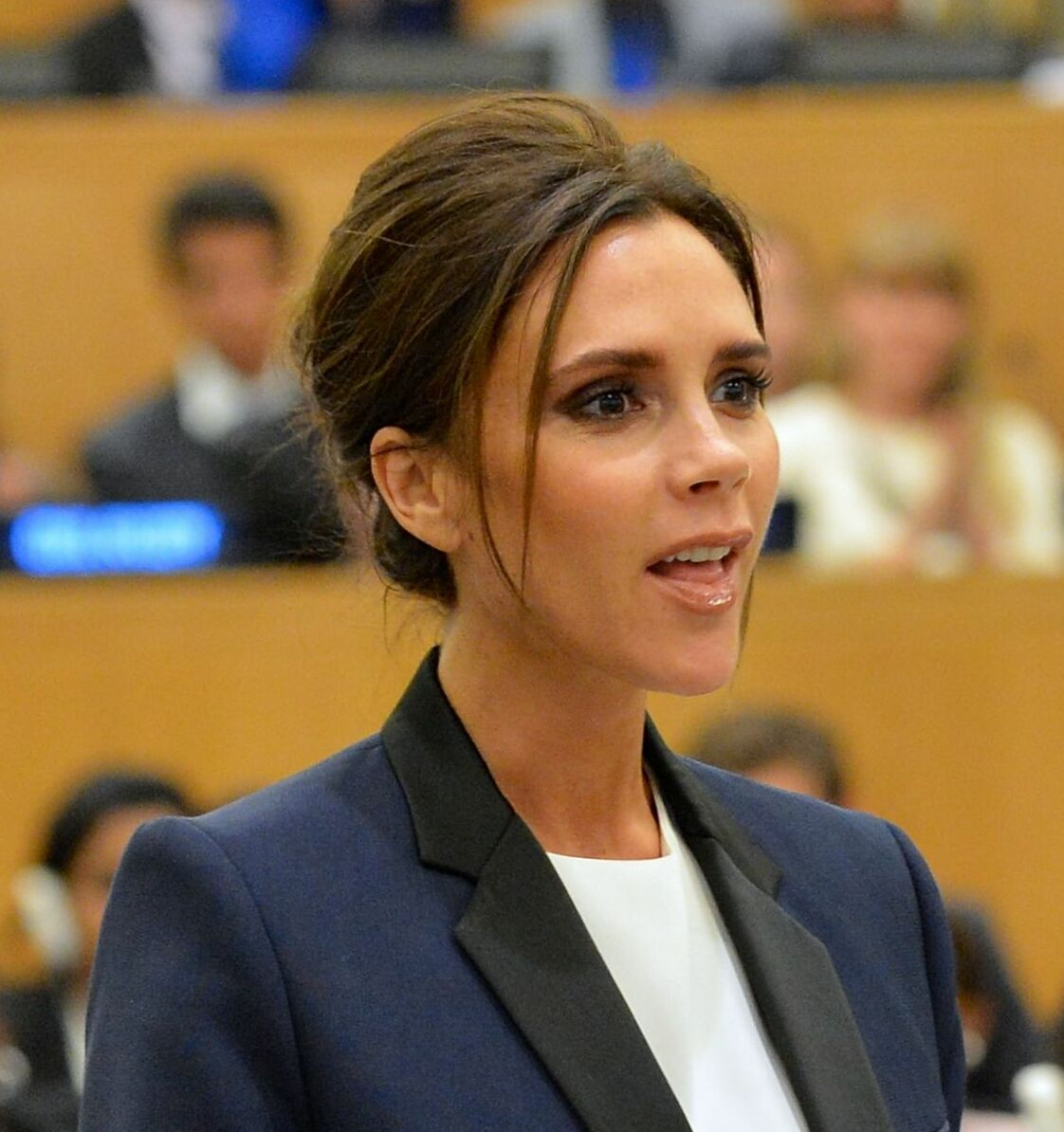
Beckham addresses the "Ending AIDS by 2030" event at the United Nations headquarters in New York City, September 2014.

In 2007, Beckham was the 52nd richest woman in Britain and the 19th richest person in Britain along with her husband David, with an estimated joint wealth of £112 million ($225 million). According to The Guardian, Beckham Ventures, a company linked to the Victoria Beckham fashion business, was the best performing brand in the family's three businesses in 2012, coming close to matching turnover in a sister company that promotes the David Beckham brand.

In 2010, Beckhams's charity work with Save the Children was nominated for the Do Something With Style Award, an awards show, produced by VH1. She is an International Goodwill Ambassador for UNAIDS and a patron of the Elton John AIDS Foundation. Beckham promotes faux/synthetic furs. Her stand against the fur industry generated praise from animal rights organizations, including PETA; Beckham has stated that she is "supportive of its [PETA's] high-profile anti-fur campaigns", and pledged "never to work with fur in any of her own fashion collections". In February 2013, she was assessed as one of the 100 most powerful women in the UK in the fashion category by Woman's Hour on BBC Radio 4. In 2014, Beckham joined the Ban Bossy campaign as a spokesperson advocating leadership roles for girls.

Beckham was appointed Officer of the Order of the British Empire (OBE) in the 2017 New Year Honours for services to the fashion industry. She stated she was "delighted and humbled for the recognition," which her husband also received in 2003. However, as recipients of honours are sworn to secrecy, and Beckham had announced her honour before the 2017 New Year Honours' official publication, she was criticised for the "betrayal of etiquette" by the Conservative MP Peter Bone. In 2026, she was appointed Chevalier of the Order of Arts and Letters by the French Ministry of Culture.

== Personal life ==
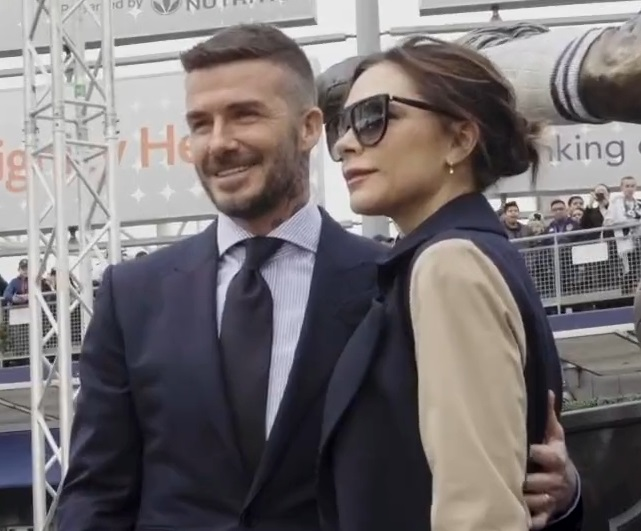
Beckham with her husband David in 2019

Beckham was engaged to electrician Mark Wood with whom she was in a relationship from 1988 to 1994. She then had a relationship with Canadian actor Corey Haim in 1995, which ended on mutual terms. She collects handbags, and owns over 100 Birkin bags, made by Hermès, including a £100,000 pink one. The full collection is estimated to be worth more than £1.5 million.

=== Marriage and children ===
In early 1997 she started dating footballer David Beckham, after they met at a charity football match; prior to this he had watched her music videos and commented to teammates that he was attracted to her, but had been overcome with shyness when they were first introduced. A few months earlier, Victoria had also expressed a wish to meet David during a Spice Girls football photo session (by chance, she wore the kit of his club Manchester United for the feature as the group's manager was a supporter). Of their initial meeting, she said, "I didn't really know who he was. I was never into football." Initially, they kept their relationship out of the public eye. The couple announced their engagement in 1998 and were dubbed "Posh and Becks" by the media.

On 4 July 1999, Victoria and David were married by the bishop of Cork, Paul Colton, at Luttrellstown Castle, Ireland. The wedding attracted much media coverage. Beckham's teammate, Gary Neville, was the best man, and the couple's four-month-old son Brooklyn was the ring bearer. Most of the media were kept away from the ceremony as an exclusive deal with OK! magazine had been arranged, but photographs were released showing the Beckhams sitting on golden thrones. Victoria wore a diamond coronet created for her by jewellery designer Slim Barrett. A total of 437 staff were employed for the wedding reception, which was estimated to have cost £500,000 (US$823,650).

The couple bought what became their most famous home for £2.5 million in 1999; the property, which is set in 24 acres (9.7 ha) of land, was given a £3 million renovation and was subsequently dubbed Beckingham Palace by the media. They sold the property in 2014. In 2024 they bought a mansion on North Bay Road in Miami Beach for a record-setting $72 million. Victoria and David have four children: sons Brooklyn (born 1999), Romeo (born 2002) and Cruz (born 2005), and daughter, Harper (born 2011). Elton John and David Furnish are reportedly the godparents of Brooklyn and Romeo Beckham and their godmother is Elizabeth Hurley. Two children were baptized Catholic at Holy Trinity, Chipping Norton; among their godparents were Eva Longoria and Marc Anthony.

=== Alleged kidnap and death threats ===
In January 2000, a tip-off to Scotland Yard detectives exposed a plot to kidnap Victoria and Brooklyn Beckham and hold them at a house in Hampstead, London. The family was then moved to a secret location, but no arrests were made. In March of that year, she received a death threat prior to performing at the Brit Awards with the Spice Girls, and at the show's rehearsal, a red laser light appeared on her chest and she was rushed off stage. After a fire door was found to be lodged open, it was thought that there had been an assassin there, and Beckham later revealed that she was terrified by the experience. In November 2002, five people were arrested after another plot for her kidnap was infiltrated by a tabloid newspaper. All charges were dropped after a witness was deemed unreliable.

=== Eating disorder ===
In a 2025 Netflix documentary, Beckham details her struggles with an eating disorder saying that it "made her good at lying."

== Filmography ==
Television
Year	Title	Role	Notes
2000	Victoria's Secrets	Herself	Reality television
2002	Being Victoria Beckham	Herself	Reality television
2003	The Real Beckhams	Herself	Reality television
2004	Victoria: A Mile in Their Shoes	Herself	Reality television
2007	Victoria Beckham: Coming to America	Herself	Reality television
2007	Ugly Betty	Herself	Episode: "A Nice Day for a Posh Wedding"
2008	Project Runway	Guest judge	Episode: "Finale"
2009	Germany's Next Topmodel	Guest judge	Episode: "Bed of Roses"
2010	American Idol	Guest judge	Episode; "Denver Audition"
2010	SpongeBob SquarePants	Queen Amphitrite	Voice; Episode: "The Clash of Triton"
2023	Beckham	Herself	Netflix documentary series
2025	Victoria Beckham	Herself	Netflix documentary series

Films
Year	Title	Role	Notes
1997	Spice World	Herself / Posh Spice	Razzie Award for Worst Actress; Nominated – Razzie Award for Worst New Star; Nominated – Orange Blimp Award for Favorite Movie Actress; Nominated – Blockbuster Entertainment Award for Favorite Actress – Comedy
2000	Manchester United: Beyond the Promised Land	Herself	Documentary
2001	Zoolander	Herself	
2007	Giving You Everything	Herself	Documentary
2012	The Spice Girls Story: Viva Forever!	Herself	Documentary

== Discography ==
- Victoria Beckham (2001)

== See also ==
- Girl power – Slogan encouraging women's empowerment
