= Victoria Beckham (album) =

2001 album by Victoria Beckham

Studio album by Victoria Beckham
- Released: 1 October 2001
- Recorded: October 1999 – July 2001
- Genres: Pop; R&B
- Length: 45:55
- Label: Virgin
- Producers: Johan Åberg; Peter Biker; Andrew Frampton; David Frank; Anders Hansson; Kenneth Karlin; Steve Kipner; Jack Kugell; Rhett Lawrence; Harvey Mason, Jr.; Matt Prime; Soulshock

Singles from Victoria Beckham
- 1. "Not Such an Innocent Girl" Released: 17 September 2001; 2. "A Mind of Its Own" Released: 11 February 2002

Victoria Beckham is the debut and only solo studio album by English singer Victoria Beckham, released on 1 October 2001 by Virgin Records. A pop and R&B album with hints of UK garage and dance music, Victoria Beckham was produced by a wide variety of producers, including Johan Åberg, Kenneth Karlin, Steve Kipner, Rhett Lawrence, Harvey Mason Jr., and Soulshock. Beckham co-wrote nine out of the twelve tracks on the standard edition of the album.

Beckham was the last member of the Spice Girls to release her solo debut album. Victoria Beckham debuted at number ten on the UK Albums Chart, the second lowest peaking debut album by a Spice Girl only behind Mel B's album Hot (2000) which only peaked at number 28. It only spent four weeks on the chart and to date has sold 54,000 copies in Britain. Internationally the album was a failure, only entering the album charts in Ireland while peaking at number twenty on the ARIA Hitseekers Albums chart.

The album's lead single "Not Such an Innocent Girl" was released on 17 September 2001 and debuted and peaked at number six on the UK Singles Chart amid a chart battle with Australian singer Kylie Minogue's single "Can't Get You Out of My Head". The second and final single "A Mind of Its Own" was promoted exclusively to the UK, also peaking at number six. The planned third single, "I Wish", which was to feature Robbie Craig, ended up being cancelled due to the announcement of Beckham's second pregnancy. Beckham was later allegedly dropped by her label due to the underperformance of the singles.

After renewed interest for "Not Such an Innocent Girl" in the song in 2026, the single climbed to number 1 of the iTunes singles charts in the United Kingdom, Ireland, Spain, Singapore, Argentina, Luxembourg, and the United Arab Emirates as well as the top 5 in Australia, Brazil, Norway, Panama, Portugal, and the Netherlands. On 23 January 2026, the song peaked at number one on both the UK Singles Downloads and UK Singles Sales charts, respectively.

== Release ==
Initially, the album was to be titled Innocent Girl and set to be released on 27 August 2001, but was released on 1 October. Beckham revealed that she felt she had "a lot to prove" with the album's release: "When I started recording this album, I had a lot to prove. I want to prove I can sing and dance and have a vision. I'm really baring my soul on this. I hope people like it. When I was with the other girls I never did a lot of the singing, so this is the first time that people are going to see me and what I am capable of." She added that she hoped the album would do well "and I can have a successful solo career."

== Singles ==
"Not Such an Innocent Girl" was released on 17 September 2001 as the lead single from the album. In the United Kingdom, the single faced competition in a hugely hyped chart battle with Kylie Minogue's single "Can't Get You Out of My Head". On the chart date of 29 September 2001, "Not Such an Innocent Girl" debuted at number six on the UK Singles Chart with first week sales of 35,000 units, while "Can't Get You Out of My Head" debuted at number one with first week sales of 306,000 units. It has sold about 80,263 copies altogether, becoming the 163rd best seller of 2001.

After renewed interest in the song in 2026, the single climbed to number 1 of the iTunes singles charts in the United Kingdom, Ireland, Spain, Singapore, Argentina, Luxembourg, and the United Arab Emirates as well as the top 5 in Australia, Brazil, Norway, Panama, Portugal, and the Netherlands. On 23 January 2026, the song peaked at number one on both the UK Singles Downloads and UK Singles Sales charts, respectively.

"A Mind of Its Own" was released on 11 February 2002 as the second single from the album. It peaked and debuted at number six on the UK Singles Chart and sold 56,570 becoming the 173rd best seller of 2002. There is a French version of the song called "Mon cœur n'en fait qu'à sa tête" (an adaptation of the title into French, or "my heart does what it wants to do").

A third single, "I Wish", was promoted but never materialised. The single version was a remix featuring Robbie Craig, and was performed on TV on Friday Night's All Wright. Following the announcement of Beckham's second pregnancy, the single was shelved. Beckham was dropped by Virgin Records along with fellow Spice Girls Emma Bunton and Melanie B, but a statement from her publicist denied reports, claiming: "No-one has been dropped. The Virgin deal has come to a natural end and both parties have decided not to continue."

== Critical reception ==
Professional ratings
Review scores
Source	Rating
AllMusic	3/5 stars
The Guardian	2/5 stars
NME	4/10
Yahoo! Music UK	4/10

Victoria Beckham was criticised for its vocals, songwriting, and production. Jacqueline Hodges from BBC Music described the album as "a mish-mash affair of gushy sentiment and wishy-washy RnB" whilst NME called the album "a new low in shameless pop slaggery". Hot Press editor Phil Udell noted that "Beckham's thin voice is buried amongst a studio creation that hints at R&B, garage and dance styling without taking it anywhere too radical." The South Wales Echo noted that Beckham's vocals were better than expected but that there were no "exceptional" tracks on the album. In a more positive review, Matthew Chisling from AllMusic wrote: "this collection of over-produced yet strong songs is a pleasantly enjoyable set."

== Chart performance ==
Victoria Beckham faced a chart battle during the album's release week with Kylie Minogue's eighth studio album Fever. Both singers had previously faced a battle in the singles' chart, when their singles were released on the same day. However, Beckham's album debuted at number ten on the UK Albums Chart on 13 October 2001, whilst Minogue's album topped the charts. Victoria Beckham charted for three weeks on the chart. By January 2020, the album had sold 54,000 copies overall in the United Kingdom. After the documentary Being Victoria Beckham aired in March 2002, the album re-entered the UK Albums Chart at number sixty-seven. After renewed interest in the album in January 2026, the album rose to the top 5 of the iTunes albums charts in the United Kingdom and Ireland. On 30 January 2026, the album peaked at number 38 on the UK Album Downloads Chart.

== Track listing ==
Victoria Beckham track listing
No.	Title	Writer(s)	Producer(s)	Length
1.	"Not Such an Innocent Girl"	Steve Kipner; Andrew Frampton	Kipner	3:17
2.	"A Mind of Its Own"	Victoria Beckham; Kipner; Frampton	Kipner	3:48
3.	"That Kind of Girl"	Kipner; David Frank; Jack Kugell	Kipner; Frank; Kugell	3:48
4.	"Like That"	Beckham; Matt Prime	Prime	4:01
5.	"Girlfriend"	Beckham; Harvey Mason Jr.; Damon Thomas; Dane Bowers; J. Valentine	The Underdogs	3:43
6.	"Midnight Fantasy"	Beckham; Johan Åberg; Paul Rein	Åberg; Anders Hansson	3:15
7.	"I.O.U"	Beckham; Frampton; Chris Braide	Frampton	3:49
8.	"No Trix, No Games"	Beckham; Kipner; Frampton	Kipner	3:03
9.	"I Wish"	Carsten Schack; Kenneth Karlin; Peter Biker; Eugene Wilde	Soulshock & Karlin	4:10
10.	"Watcha Talkin' Bout"	Beckham; Schack; Karlin; Nate Butler	Soulshock & Karlin	3:51
11.	"Unconditional Love"	Beckham; Rhett Lawrence	Lawrence	3:50
12.	"Every Part of Me"	Beckham; Schack; Karlin; E. Yancey; Nate Butler	Soulshock & Karlin	5:11
Total length:				45:55

Japanese bonus tracks
No.	Title	Writer(s)	Producer(s)	Length
13.	"Not Such an Innocent Girl" (Robbie Rivera's Main Vocal Mix)	Kipner; Frampton	Kipner; Robbie Rivera^{[a]}	6:56
14.	"Not Such an Innocent Girl" (Sunship radio edit)	Kipner; Frampton	Kipner; Sunship^{[a]}	3:43

Notes

- ^{^[a]} signifies additional producer(s)

== Charts ==
2001 weekly chart performance for Victoria Beckham
Chart (2001)	Peak position
Australian Hitseekers Albums (ARIA)	20
Irish Albums (IRMA)	69
Scottish Albums (Official Charts)	20
UK Albums (Official Charts)	10
European Albums (Eurotipsheet)	50

2026 weekly chart performance for Victoria Beckham
Chart (2026)	Peak position
UK Album Downloads (OCC)	38

== Sales ==
Sales for Victoria Beckham
Region	Certification	Certified units/sales
United Kingdom	—	54,000

== See also ==
- List of most expensive albums
