= Wannabe: How the Spice Girls Reinvented Pop Fame =

- Author: David Sinclair
- Language: English
- Publisher: Omnibus Press
- Publication date: 2004
- Publication place: United Kingdom
- Pages: 324 pages
- ISBN: 0-7119-8643-6

Wannabe: How the Spice Girls Reinvented Pop Fame is a biography of the Spice Girls written by David Sinclair. It was published in 2004 by Omnibus Press.
