= All Saints discography =

- Studio albums: 5
- Compilation albums: 2
- Singles: 18
- Video albums: 2
- Music videos: 19
- Remix albums: 1

The discography of the English girl group All Saints consists of five studio albums, two compilation albums, one remix album, two video albums and 18 singles between London Records and Parlophone Records.

After the two promotional-only single releases "Silver Shadow" and "Let's Get Started" as All Saints 1.9.7.5., All Saints renamed, reformed and released their debut commercially available single "I Know Where It's At" in 1997 via London Records and reached number four on the UK Singles Chart. Their second public single "Never Ever" was released in November 1997, and introduced the group to international success, reaching the top ten in several countries and topping the charts in the United Kingdom and Australia. It sold over 1.2 million copies in the UK and was eventually certified double platinum by the British Phonographic Industry. In 1998 the group won BRIT Awards for Best British Single and Best British Video, both for "Never Ever". The group released their self-titled debut album All Saints in October 1997. It reached number two in the UK and was certified five times platinum by the BPI for sales of 1.5 million. While, "If You Want to Party (I Found Lovin')" has been released in Japan only, their third single from the album was "Lady Marmalade", soon re-released as a double A-side with "Under the Bridge", which became their second and third UK number-one single in May 1998, earning a gold certification for 400,000 copies sold. The same month, the album was re-released with a slightly different track listing. "Bootie Call", the fourth single, sixth overall, also went to number-one, and the silver-certified "War of Nerves" (the fifth and final release) peaked at number seven, selling 200,000 copies. The album achieved success in countries such as Australia (double platinum, selling 140,000 copies), Canada (triple platinum, 300,000 copies), and the United States, where All Saints was certified platinum by the RIAA for sales of one million and produced two top 40 singles on the Billboard Hot 100: "I Know Where It's At" and "Never Ever".

All Saints returned in February 2000 with the single "Pure Shores", written by Shaznay Lewis and William Orbit for the soundtrack of the film The Beach (starring Leonardo DiCaprio). "Pure Shores" was their fifth number-one single in the UK and the second best-selling single of 2000, with 600,000 copies sold; it also became their first and only number-one single in Ireland and was a substantial hit across Europe and Australia. The song won an Ivor Novello Award for Most Performed Work. All Saints performed the song at the 2000 MTV Europe Music Awards. In October 2000, All Saints released the single "Black Coffee", which became their sixth and final number-one single in the UK, selling 200,000 copies. This preceded their second studio album, Saints & Sinners, which debuted at number one on the UK Albums Chart, eventually reaching double-platinum certification in the UK for sales of 600,000 copies. The third and final single was "All Hooked Up" in January 2001, which peaked at number seven. In February 2001, All Saints announced that they were to take a break so that they "could clear the air" between themselves. Melanie Blatt said later that year that it was uncertain if they would reform, citing their difficulties with the financial and business aspects of the group. Shaznay Lewis later explained that the catalyst for the break-up was a disagreement over who would wear a certain jacket for a photo shoot: "I would never in a million years have put money on the group ending over a jacket incident. But when that incident happened, it fired up so strong, it had to be over. And the way I was then, the state we'd got into then, there was no way she was getting that stupid jacket." In November 2001, London Records released a greatest hits compilation entitled All Hits.

On 24 January 2006, it was announced that the band had reformed and signed a record deal with Parlophone. They subsequently began work on their third studio album, Studio 1. The first single, "Rock Steady" (released in November 2006), reached number three on the UK Singles Chart. Studio 1 entered the albums chart at number forty, falling significantly short of the success of "Rock Steady" and the group's previous releases; it has since sold 100,000 copies according to the BPI, being certified gold. A second single, "Chick Fit", followed in February 2007, but promotional appearances and a physical release were cancelled and it failed to reach the top 200. It was subsequently reported that All Saints and Parlophone had parted ways and the group cancelled their planned UK tour. Despite Melanie Blatt confirming that the group would never reform again in a 2009 interview, All Saints reformed in 2013 to support Backstreet Boys for five dates in their UK tour a year later. Due to the success of the tour, the band announced on 27 January 2016 that they were releasing their first new album in ten years titled Red Flag, which was released on 8 April 2016, with "One Strike" issued as the lead single for the album.

== Albums ==
=== Studio albums ===
List of albums, with selected chart positions, and certifications
Title	Album details	Peak chart positions										Certifications
Title	Album details	UK	AUS	CAN	FRA	GER	NL	NZ	SWE	SWI	US	Certifications
All Saints	Released: 15 October 1997; Label: London; Format: CD, digital download, cassette	2	4	10	19	12	10	2	13	3	40	BPI: 5× Platinum; ARIA: 2× Platinum; IFPI SWI: Platinum; MC: 3× Platinum; NVPI: Gold; RIAA: Platinum; RMNZ: Platinum
Saints & Sinners	Released: 14 October 2000; Label: London; Format: CD, digital download, cassette	1	20	—	36	14	16	8	10	7	—	BPI: 2× Platinum; ARIA: Gold
Studio 1	Released: 13 November 2006; Label: Parlophone; Format: CD, digital download	40	—	—	—	—	—	—	—	73	—	BPI: Gold
Red Flag	Released: 8 April 2016; Label: London; Format: CD, digital download, LP	3	77	—	—	—	89	—	—	70	—	
Testament	Released: 27 July 2018; Label: AS; Format: CD, digital download, LP	15	—	—	—	—	—	—	—	—	—	
"—" denotes a recording that did not chart or was not released in that territory.

=== Compilation albums ===
List of albums, with selected chart positions and certifications
Title	Album details	Peak chart positions				Certifications
Title	Album details	UK	GER	NZ	SWI	Certifications
The Remix Album	Released: 29 December 1998; Label: London; Format: CD, digital download, cassette	104	—	—	—	
All Hits	Released: 5 November 2001; Label: London; Format: CD, digital download, cassette	18	71	24	51	BPI: Gold
Pure Shores: The Very Best of All Saints	Released: 27 September 2010; Label: London, Parlophone; Formats: CD, digital download	—	—	—	—	
"—" denotes a recording that did not chart or was not released in that territory.

=== Video albums ===
List of albums, with some notes
Title	Album details
The Video	Released: 1998; Label: London; Format: VHS
The Videos	Released: 3 December 2001; Label: London; Format: DVD

== Singles ==
List of singles, with selected chart positions and certifications, showing year released and album name
Title	Year	Peak chart positions										Certifications	Album
Title	Year	UK	AUS	BEL (FL)	FRA	IRL	NLD	NZ	SWE	SWI	US	Certifications	Album
"Silver Shadow" (as All Saints 1.9.7.5.)	1994	92	—	—	—	—	—	—	—	—	—		Non-album singles
"If You Wanna Party (I Found Lovin')" (as All Saints 1.9.7.5.)	1995	168	—	—	—	—	—	—	—	—	—		Non-album singles
"I Know Where It's At"	1997	4	12	37	20	19	52	8	37	25	36	BPI: Silver; ARIA: Gold	All Saints
"Never Ever"	1997	1	1	4	4	2	4	1	3	4	4	BPI: 3× Platinum; ARIA: 2× Platinum; BRMA: Gold; GLF: Gold; IFPI SWI: Gold; RMNZ: Platinum	All Saints
"Under the Bridge"	1998	1	5	33	31	3	18	4	16	24	—	BPI: Gold; ARIA: Gold	All Saints
"Lady Marmalade"	1998	1	5	—	28	—	—	4	—	45	—	BPI: Gold; ARIA: Gold	All Saints
"Bootie Call"	1998	1	59	34	—	9	8	—	31	—	—	BPI: Silver	All Saints
"War of Nerves"	1998	7	—	— (Note: "War of Nerves" did not enter the Ultratop 50 chart, but peaked at number 13 on the Ultratip chart.)	—	21	79	50	—	—	—	BPI: Silver	All Saints
"Pure Shores"	2000	1	4	5	6	1	10	2	10	6	—	BPI: 2× Platinum; ARIA: Platinum; BRMA: Gold; GLF: Gold; RMNZ: Platinum; SNEP: Gold	Saints & Sinners
"Black Coffee"	2000	1	20	42	33	6	24	7	8	28	—	BPI: Silver	Saints & Sinners
"All Hooked Up"	2001	7	—	— (Note: "All Hooked Up" did not enter the Ultratop 50 chart, but peaked at number 16 on the Ultratip chart.)	—	18	95	50	—	96	—		Saints & Sinners
"Rock Steady"	2006	3	98	42	—	15	52	38	41	37	—		Studio 1
"One Strike"	2016	115	—	—	—	—	—	—	—	—	—		Red Flag
"This Is a War"	2016	—	—	—	—	—	—	—	—	—	—		Red Flag
"One Woman Man"	2016	192	—	—	—	—	—	—	—	—	—		Red Flag
"Love Lasts Forever"	2018	— (Note: "Love Lasts Forever" did not enter the UK Singles Chart but peaked at number 33 on the UK Radio Airplay Chart.)	—	—	—	—	—	—	—	—	—		Testament
"After All"	2018	— (Note: "After All" did not enter the UK Singles Chart but peaked at number 26 on the UK Radio Airplay Chart.Company)	—	—	—	—	—	—	—	—	—		Testament
"—" denotes releases that did not chart or were not released in that territory.

=== Promotional singles ===
Title	Year	Album
"Chick Fit"	2007	Studio 1
"Message in a Bottle" (with Sting)	2020	Non-album promotional single

== Music videos ==
Year	Single	Director	Refs
1994	"Silver Shadow"	—N/a	
1995	"Let's Get Started"	Guy Nisbett	
1997	"I Know Where It's At"	Alex Hemming	
1997	"If You Want to Party (I Found Lovin')"	Guy Nisbett	
1997	"Never Ever"	Sean Ellis	
1998	"Under the Bridge"	Philippe André	
1998	"Lady Marmalade"	Philippe André	
1998	"Bootie Call"	Vaughan Arnell	
1998	"War of Nerves"	W.I.Z.	
1998	"Never Ever" (US version)	Big TV!	
2000	"Pure Shores"	Vaughan Arnell	
2000	"Black Coffee"	Johan Renck	
2000	"All Hooked Up"	Douglas Avery	
2006	"Rock Steady"	W.I.Z.	
2006	"Chick Fit"	Daniel Wolfe	
2016	"One Strike"	Tom Beard	
2016	"This Is a War"	Rankin	
2018	"Love Lasts Forever"	Max & Dania	
2018	"After All"	Max & Dania	

== Other appearances ==
- "Girls on Film", on Trevor Horn Reimagines the Eighties
