= One Woman Man (song) =

2016 single by All Saints

Single by All Saints

from the album Red Flag
- Released: 7 October 2016
- Length: 4:01
- Label: London
- Songwriters: Shaznay Lewis; Dan Radclyffe
- Producers: Utters; K-Gee

All Saints singles chronology
"This Is a War" (2016)	"One Woman Man" (2016)	"Love Lasts Forever" (2018)

Audio video
- "One Woman Man" on YouTube

"One Woman Man" is a song recorded by English-Canadian girl group All Saints for their fourth studio album, Red Flag (2016). It was written by group member Shaznay Lewis in collaboration with Dan Radclyffe, whilst production was handled by the latter and K-Gee. "One Woman Man" was released as the album's third single on 7 October 2016, by London Records.

== Background and release ==
A promotional video was shared by All Saints on social media in June 2015, suggesting an upcoming project and tour. Similarly, on 1 January 2016, the group posted a promotional image of themselves looking upwards in front of a grey background with the text "2016". On 27 January, the group announced that their fourth studio album Red Flag would be released on 8 April 2016, along with lead single "One Strike" being released in February. "One Woman Man" was unveiled as the first promotional single from the album on 18 March 2016. A five-track remixes EP was released for digital download on 7 October 2016.

== Composition ==
Musically, "One Woman Man" incorporates synthesizers and symphonic instrumentation, and is accompanied by "clipped" beats and "icy" strings. Lyrically the song sees the "resilient" group marching into battle against an undesirable woman competing for the same man. "Every battle has a widow, the mourner won't be me" they declare. On the song's chorus, All Saints sing, "Tell me are you ready for me yet? I know you can make her understand / Tell me are you ever gonna be a one woman man?". As the song grows in intensity, it reaches its bridge: "Tell her that it's too late / 'Cause I'm never walking away, my love is here to stay! / Didn't she hear me say I ain't going nowhere?". According to Robbie Daw from Idolator, the opening lyric from the song ("Sometimes is it better to let go") is a metaphor for the group, who split in 2001 due to constant fighting. The lyrics to "One Woman Man" were inspired directly by their own lives and highlight their diverse personal experiences in the past ten years.

== Critical reception ==
Jennifer Ruby from the Evening Standard stated that the track "proves that the band are going from strength-to-strength with their comeback". Amy Davidson of Digital Spy commented that it was "the comeback single we've been waiting for. Don't get us wrong, 'One Strike' was good and everything, but 'One Woman Man' is even better". Similarly, Gigwise's Valerie Siebert said, "The anthem 'One Woman Man' is similarly defiant in nature [to 'One Strike']". Robbie Daw from Idolator stated the song was another "absolutely fantastic cut from All Saints, and a lovely follow-up to previous single 'One Strike'". Attitude magazine called it "stellar", whilst Exclaim!'s Yasmine Shemesh classified it as "anthemic". In another positive review, Courtney Buck from The 405 commented, "Full of heavy drums and sharp strings, it's another booming anthem to add to All Saints' already full arsenal of anthems".

== Live performances ==
"One Woman Man" was included on the setlist for their first headlining show in over a decade at London's KOKO, on 4 April 2016. The group also performed the song on BBC One's The One Show four days later, It was also performed by All Saints at Proms in the Park in Hyde Park on 10 September 2016. "One Woman Man" was performed as part of the setlist of their 2016 Red Flag Tour, and the Testament Tour in 2018.

== Track listings ==
- Digital download
1. "One Woman Man" – 4:01
- Digital download (Remixes)
1. "One Woman Man" (K-Gee Big Tings Refix) – 4:59
2. "One Woman Man" (Paul Morrell Radio Mix) – 3:25
3. "One Woman Man" (VAHNI Remix / Radio Edit) – 3:58
4. "One Woman Man" (Blackmore Remix) – 2:40
5. "One Woman Man" (Paul Morrell Club Mix) – 5:26

== Credits ==
Credits adapted from the single's digital release.

- Shaznay Lewis – vocals, songwriter
- Melanie Blatt – vocals
- Nicole Appleton – vocals
- Natalie Appleton – vocals
- Dan Radclyffe – songwriter, producer
- K-Gee – additional producer
- Tim Wills – keyboards, programming
- Dick Beetham – mastering engineer
- Adrian Hall – mixing

== Charts ==
Chart (2016)	Peak position
UK Singles (Official Charts Company)	192
UK Singles Downloads (OCC)	84
UK Singles Sales (Official Charts Company)	84
