= After All (All Saints song) =

Single by All Saints

from the album Testament
- Released: 26 July 2018
- Length: 4:36
- Label: AS
- Songwriters: Shaznay Lewis; William Orbit; Peter Hutchings
- Producer: William Orbit

All Saints singles chronology
"Love Lasts Forever" (2018)	"After All" (2018)

Music video
- "After All" on YouTube

"After All" is a song by English-Canadian girl group All Saints from their fifth studio album, Testament (2018). Written by group member Shaznay Lewis along with Peter Hutchings and its producer William Orbit, it was released as the album's second single on 26 July 2018, by AS Recordings.

== Background ==
On 29 May 2018, All Saints announced the release of their fifth studio album – and second after their reunion – titled Testament. Group member Shaznay Lewis commented that "this album feels exactly where we should be – and want to be – right now creatively", and that a highlight was reuniting with "the king of beautiful interesting sounds, William Orbit, which was just amazing". Having worked together 18 years before on the singles "Pure Shores" and "Black Coffee", Lewis explained to Dazed magazine that they had never completely lost contact with the producer, having spoken to him "here and there" since working with him. "But Nicole [Appleton] and I ran into William one night, and he was like, 'I've heard you guys are doing new music and shows and it's going really well, so when are we going to do something again?' We were literally like, 'Okay yeah, let's do it'", she said. Appleton added that it was like working with an old friend. "Things just happened really naturally and fell into place", she commented.

When asked if they were apprehensive about working with Orbit again and the pressure of having already made two hits with him, Lewis replied:

"I know what you mean, but I hate to think that we could never have gone back in the studio with him because we were too scared. We can't make another 'Pure Shores' – we'd be mad to try. But at the end of the day, it's about evolving. William is someone who's renowned for a certain sound, so there's always going to be inflections and reminders of past songs. But as long as what we’re working on now is good, and we all like what we're creating, it definitely feels right".

"After All" was released as the second single from Testament on 26 July 2018, by AS Recordings, just one day before the album's release.

== Composition ==
"After All" is a song "full of echos and melancholy", carrying "multi-layered harmonies" from All Saints. Lyrically, it is an "unfortunate ode to the first unrepeatable love". The lyrics, "all the reasons why we said it's over doesn't seem to matter after all" could be applied to a romantic break-up and could also be seen as dealing with the band's acrimonious split. The Observer's Phil Mongredien commented that "After All" recalled producer Orbit's work on "Pure Shores" (2000).

== Critical reception ==
"After All" received positive reviews from music critics. HMV.com stated that the song was one of the album's standout moments. Andre Paine of Evening Standard said that the combination of "steely harmonies and lush electronic textures" was an "appealing throwback" tracks like "After All". Calling the song "absorbing", Classic Pop magazine noted that "producer William Orbit's fingerprints are everywhere" on it. Jonathan Wright of God is in the TV said it was "glorious to hear his signature warm production rippling like waves. All Saints give a typically gorgeus performance with their exquisite multi-layered harmonies". Whilst criticising most of Testament, Laura Snapes of The Guardian commented that "After All is intimate and rueful, with the chorus equivalent of a window being opened on a boiling day – it's a rare moment of genuine emotion".

== Music video ==
The accompanying music video for "After All" was directed by Max & Dania, and was premiered on 16 October 2018, on All Saints' official site. It is a prequel to "Love Lasts Forever", and features scenes of a young couple along with scenes of the group.

== Live performances ==
To promote the single, All Saints performed "After All" on Radio 2 Live in Hyde Park, as well as on BBC Radio 2's The Michael Ball Show. They performed the song on their 2018 Testament Tour.

== Track listings ==
- After All (F9 Mixes) – EP
1. "After All" (F9 Mixshow) – 6:09
2. "After All" (F9 Club Mix) – 7:49
3. "After All" (F9 Instrumental) – 7:49
- After All (W.LDN.SoundSystem Refix) – Single
1. "After All" (W.LDN.SoundSystem Refix) – 3:44
- After All (Acoustic) – Single
1. "After All" (Acoustic) – 4:16
- After All (K-Gee's Friday Night Refix) – Single
1. "After All" (K-Gee's Friday Night Refix) – 3:50

== Charts ==
Chart (2018)	Peak position
UK Radio Airplay (Official Charts Company)	26
