= Testament (album) =

2018 studio album by All Saints

Studio album by All Saints
- Released: 27 July 2018
- Studios: Manley Court, Stoke Newington; Sunhatch II
- Genres: Electronic; R&B
- Length: 47:01
- Label: AS
- Producers: Karl "K-Gee" Gordon; George Moore; William Orbit

All Saints chronology
Red Flag (2016)	Testament (2018)

Singles from Testament
- 1. "Love Lasts Forever" Released: 31 May 2018; 2. "After All" Released: 26 July 2018

Testament is the fifth and final studio album by English girl group All Saints. It was released on 27 July 2018 through AS Recordings, the group's independent record label. The album followed their 2016 comeback record Red Flag and marked their first collaboration with producer George Moore, alongside longtime collaborator Karl "K-Gee" Gordon and producer William Orbit, who returned to work with the group for the first time since 2000's Saints & Sinners. Testament features a mix of electronic pop and R&B influences.

The album received generally favourable reviews from critics, who praised its production and mature songwriting. It debuted at number 15 on the UK Albums Chart with first-week sales of 3,486 copies. Testament was preceded by the release of the singles "Love Lasts Forever" and "After All", both of which reached the top 40 of the UK Airplay Chart. All Saints supported the album with a nationwide tour later that year, performing across major UK cities to promote the release.

== Background and development ==
Following a hiatus of nearly 10 years, All Saints released their fourth album Red Flag in April 2016. It received generally positive reviews from music critics and entered the UK Albums Chart at number three. After the group embarked on the Red Flag Tour in October 2016, a sold-out headlining tour in support of the album, member Shaznay Lewis began working on demos for Testament.

The album is the band's first to feature production by George Moore. All Saints favoured working with him because being their tour managing director, he had knowledge of their voices, sound and what songs would translate in a live setting. During her first studio session with Moore after the Red Flag Tour, Lewis wrote "Who Do You Love" and liked the drama in its music. However, Lewis felt it was missing something until she read an extract from poet Lang Leav's book, The Universe of Us, which became the song's introduction. Among the first tracks recorded for Testament, "Three Four" came about during a late-night open mic Lewis, and group members Melanie Blatt and Nicole Appleton had over drinks with their long-time producer Karl "K-Gee" Gordon.

All Saints found inspiration from music Gordon played in the studio or songs they listened to on tour. Lewis made use of a dictaphone to record sounds that inspired her. She recorded the melody for "I Would" on her phone in an empty sauna. "Don't Look Over Your Shoulder" was written in Blatt's house in Ibiza. It was inspired by "Super Rich Kids" by Frank Ocean featuring Earl Sweatshirt; both songs sample the thumping piano line of Elton John's "Benny and the Jets". Blatt referred to it as being the punch line of another song Lewis wrote that ultimately did not make the album's final track listing. The original production of "Footprints" which Lewis composed with producer Fred Ball was scrapped in favour of a version Gordon sent that turned down the backing track for the group to approve vocals. They chose this version inspired by the minimalism of Chloe x Halle's The Kids Are Alright. "Fumes" was among the last tracks developed for Testament. Lewis said its backing track "kind of sat around for a while and once we sort of came up with an idea, it happened quite quickly." "Glorious" was recorded when All Saints thought the album was complete. Recording for the album took place at Manley Court Studios in Stoke Newington and Sunhatch II Studios.

=== William Orbit sessions ===
In May 2018, All Saints confirmed that they had worked with producer William Orbit for the first time since their second album, Saints & Sinners (2000). Orbit had focused on art instead of music for the last 10 years of his career, and it was not until Lewis and Nicole Appleton ran into him one night in Soho that he suggested working with the band again. Recording with Orbit would involve the group doing numerous vocal takes through trial and error, instead of him "chopping up the vocals and piecing them together".

Orbit co-wrote and produced two songs for Testament. The first, "Testament In Motion", was a revisited demo that he wrote with Lewis in 2008 during the band's second hiatus. Lewis kept the demo throughout her time of writing for other singers and bands, believing it was an All Saints song. Blatt was the most reluctant to like the track and found it dated. She gave a lot of musical input and spent time in the studio, picking the song apart and homing in on instruments Lewis never took notice of. These instruments were then enhanced and took the track in a new direction, making it sound completely different to the demo. "After All" was the most challenging song on Testament to finish. Lewis wrote the track with Hutch, who produced the group's 2016 single "One Strike", but felt its sound did not fit with the rest of the album and asked Orbit to rework it. The song went through many mixes with Lewis not playing some to the rest of the band because she saw no point.

== Critical reception ==
Professional ratings
Aggregate scores
Source	Rating
AnyDecentMusic?	6.1/10
Metacritic	61/100
Review scores
Source	Rating
The Arts Desk	3/5 stars
Classic Pop	4/5 stars
The Daily Telegraph	3/5 stars
Evening Standard	4/5 stars
God Is in the TV	8/10
The Guardian	2/5 stars
The Independent	4/5 stars
The Observer	3/5 stars
Q	3/5 stars

Testament received generally favourable reviews from music critics. At Metacritic, which assigns a normalized rating out of 100 to reviews from publications, it received a weighted average score of 61, based on 5 reviews. AnyDecentMusic? gave the album 6.1 out of 10, based on their assessment of the critical consensus.

God Is in the TV's Jonathan Wright called it "a stylish and confident album full of their usual majestic vocals and strong character" that "reveals its depth the more you listen" and "solidified their return as one of the most pleasing comebacks of recent times." Andre Paine of the Evening Standard argued that "closer listening reveals sonic innovation underpinning the melodies", and concluded, "With this assured album, you might realise just how much you've missed them." Thomas H. Green of The Arts Desk wrote that "alongside solid songwriting, it consistently showcases a proud upbeat sense of unforced optimism that's welcome." The Independent's Elizabeth Aubrey believed All Saints evolved their sound and regarded Testament as "a welcome and judicious follow on from Red Flag."

In a mixed review, The Daily Telegraph music critic Neil McCormick called it the band's best album in two decades, writing that it "elegantly updates" their sound, but felt its "looking-for-a-man stuff is out of kilter with their independent swagger". Phil Mongredien of The Observer thought the album "finds them going some way to recapturing past glories" but is "let down by a few too many unremarkable ballads". Writing for Q magazine, Michael Cragg commented that although Testament "produces occasional magic", it is "often suffocated by vaguely outré production flourishes". Laura Snapes of The Guardian was less impressed, writing that the group were "drowned out by digital clutter". She described the album as "clenched and over-serious" and "mostly weak Lemonade".

== Chart performance ==
Testament debuted at number 15 on the UK Albums Chart, with first-week sales of 3,486 units.

== Track listing ==
Testament track listing
No.	Title	Writer(s)	Producer(s)	Length
1.	"Who Do You Love"	Shaznay Lewis; George Moore; Lang Leav	Karl "K-Gee" Gordon	4:13
2.	"Three Four"	Lewis; Gordon; Ben Cullum	Gordon	4:28
3.	"Love Lasts Forever"	Lewis; Gordon	Gordon	4:06
4.	"Nowhere to Hide (Interlude)"	Lewis		0:31
5.	"No Issues"	Lewis; Moore	Moore; Gordon^{[a]}	3:47
6.	"After All"	Lewis; Pete Hutchings; William Orbit	Orbit; Hutch^{[b]}; Tim Rowkins^{[a]}; Gordon^{[a]}	4:36
7.	"I Would"	Lewis; Moore	Moore	3:47
8.	"Don't Look Over Your Shoulder"	Lewis; Moore; Elton John; Bernie Taupin	Moore; Gordon	3:56
9.	"Fumes"	Lewis; Gordon	Gordon	4:13
10.	"Testament in Motion"	Lewis; Orbit	Orbit; Rowkins^{[a]}	3:53
11.	"Breathe and Let Go (Interlude)"	Lewis		0:53
12.	"Glorious"	Lewis; Gordon	Gordon	4:09
13.	"Footprints"	Lewis; Fred Ball	Gordon	4:29
Total length:				47:01

Notes

- ^{^a} signifies an additional producer
- ^{^b} signifies a vocal producer
- "Who Do You Love" contains extracts from the book, The Universe of Us, written by Lang Leav.

== Charts ==
Weekly chart performance for Testament
Chart (2018)	Peak position
Irish Independent Albums (IRMA)	11
Scottish Albums (Official Charts)	15
UK Albums (Official Charts)	15
UK Independent Albums (Official Charts)	1
