= Curfew (song) =

Single by Drive
- Released: 1993
- Genre: Electronic
- Length: 3:33
- Label: Ninja Tune
- Producers: Jay Strongman, Woodie Taylor

"Curfew" is a song by Drive, released as their first and only single in 1993. Drive consisted of Julienne Davis and Melanie Guillaume, who later became known as a member of All Saints, as Melanie Blatt. The single was released both in the United Kingdom and Germany.

== Track listing ==
#	Title	Length
1.	"Curfew" (Rebel Radio Mix)	3:33
2.	"Curfew" (Beatmasters 12" Mix)	6:15
3.	"Curfew" (Rebel Funk Mix)	3:46
4.	"Curfew" (Beatmasters Instrumental)	6:15

== Song information ==
Instrument	Performed by
Producer	Jay Strongman and Woodie Taylor
Lead vocals	Melanie Guillaume
