= House of 9 =

- Promotional poster
- Directed by: Steven R. Monroe
- Written by: Philippe Vidal
- Produced by: Karen Hamilton; Philippe Martinez
- Starring: Dennis Hopper; Kelly Brook; Hippolyte Girardot; Susie Amy; Morven Christie; Peter Capaldi; Asher D; Julienne Davis; Jim Carter
- Cinematography: Damian Bromley
- Edited by: Kristina Hamilton-Grobler
- Music by: Mark Ryder; Charles Olins
- Distributed by: Bauer Martinez Studios
- Release date: 20 May 2004
- Running time: 88 minutes
- Countries: United Kingdom; Romania
- Languages: English; French
- Budget: $6 million

House of 9 is a 2004 psychological horror film directed by Steven R. Monroe and starring Dennis Hopper and Kelly Brook. It follows nine strangers who have been abducted and locked inside a house. A mysterious voice called The Watcher (voiced by Jim Carter) tells them that they are to play a game: the last person alive can leave the house and win five million dollars. The film is presented with "live feeds" from hidden surveillance cameras, showing the nine people turning from cooperative escape attempts to a killing fest.

House of 9 premiered at the Cannes Film Festival on 20 May 2004.

== Plot ==
Lea, a young woman, wakes up in an unfamiliar, eerie mansion and quickly realizes she’s been kidnapped. As she explores the house, she finds several other unconscious people who soon awaken. Panic sets in when they discover that all the exits are sealed. As Lea tries to escape, she collapses from the stress, only to be revived by a priest named Father Duffy. The group is then informed by a mysterious voice over the intercom: they must play a deadly game. The rules are simple: kill each other until only one remains, and that survivor will walk free with five million dollars.

The group—consisting of Lea, a dancer; Jay, a cop; Claire, a tennis player; Francis, a musician; Cynthia, his wife; Al B, a rapper; Shona, a drug addict; and Max, a French-speaking fashion designer—tries to escape through various means, including battering down a door and digging through the basement. However, their efforts are in vain. When they find food being delivered through a dumbwaiter, the tension grows. They spend the night divided, with Father Duffy in one room and the rest sharing rooms.

The next day, an unknown attacker injures Jay, leading to a confrontation among the group. As trust fractures, the players start to turn on each other. After a brutal fight, Al B accidentally kills Cynthia, and Jay locks him away. But when food rations start to dwindle, tensions rise. After an altercation, Al B escapes, brutally killing Jay in the process.

As the game continues, more blood is spilled. Francis becomes unhinged, and a chaotic series of violent events follows—Claire stabs Shona, Francis electrocutes Lea, and Francis himself ends up killing both Claire and Father Duffy. In the final confrontation, after a struggle with Francis, Lea manages to escape, only to discover the game isn’t over.

The film ends with Lea walking toward the exit, finding a bag that presumably contains the money, but her relief quickly fades when she realizes there are other survivors, still visibly shaken. The true horror dawns on her: the game is far from finished.

== Cast ==
- Dennis Hopper as Father Michael Duffy
- Kelly Brook as Lea
- Hippolyte Girardot as Francis
- Susie Amy as Claire Leevy
- Morven Christie as Shona
- Peter Capaldi as Max Roy
- Asher D as Al B
- Raffaello Degruttola as Jay
- Julienne Davis as Cynthia
- Jim Carter as The Watcher (voice)

== Production ==
Filming for House of 9 took place in Romania.

== Reception ==
House of 9 received mixed reviews from critics and audiences. An especially harsh review from the website Film Verdicts called the film "preposterous pretentiousness". Dread Central said, "House of 9 does what it sets out to do, and that’s to deliver to its viewers a movie that sucks you in until you cannot breathe." DVD Talk said, "See it for the hotties, for the nasty kill scenes, and for the always-insane Dennis Hopper at his most adorably weird." The Hartford Courant reviewed the film, noting that "As with "Saw II'' (and almost any slasher movie these days), the killings become tedious, something to be endured so you can see how it ends."

== Home media ==
The DVD was released on 14 February 2006 in the US.
