= Red Flag Tour =

2016 concert tour by All Saints

- Tour by All Saints
- Associated album: Red Flag
- Start date: 6 October 2016
- End date: 18 October 2016
- Legs: 1
- No. of shows: 10 in Europe

All Saints concert chronology
- Saints & Sinners Tour (2001; cancelled); Red Flag Tour (2016); Testament Tour (2018)

The Red Flag Tour was the second headlining concert tour by British girl group All Saints. Supporting their fourth studio album Red Flag (2016), the tour ran from 6 October 2016 to 18 October 2016. It marked the group's first headlining tour in 15 years and was preceded by a headlining show at London's KOKO on 4 April 2016.

== Background and announcement ==
It's incredible to think our last proper tour was over 15 years ago. So we've been waiting for this moment for a very long time. From the feedback we've read online it seems like A LOT of our fans have been anxiously waiting too. We can't wait to get out there and see everyone.

— All Saints

After splitting in 2009, All Saints were unexpectedly invited to perform as special guests for five dates of the Backstreet Boys' In a World Like This Tour in Ireland and the UK. Their tour dates ran from 26 March to 5 April 2014. Although All Saints made no money from the tour and funded their sets themselves, they saw it as an opportunity to do what they enjoyed the most and did the least, describing the experience as "refreshing" and "money well spent". It ultimately sparked interest within the group to pursue a new studio album and full-scale comeback; group member Natalie Appleton explained: "We thought we'd just do it for a laugh, but then we just didn't want it to end. We liked being together. We wanted to be together. I mean we hang out anyway, but we wanted to be together in this world."

On 22 February 2016, All Saints announced their first headlining show in over a decade at London's KOKO. Tickets for the show on 4 April 2016 sold out in a minute. On 15 March 2016, the group announced their first headlining tour in 15 years in support of their 2016 comeback album, Red Flag. Tickets for the tour were first made available on 16 March 2016 through an exclusive fan pre-sale on the group's website for its newsletter subscribers, and then later through Gigsandtours.com on 18 March 2016 at 09:00 BST. The Red Flag Tour will visit 10 British cities throughout October 2016, beginning in Newcastle upon Tyne and ending in Norwich. The group revealed that the tour set list will comprise all of their successful singles as well as some tracks from Red Flag.

== Setlist ==
1. "Intro"
2. "I Know Where It's At"
3. "Puppet on a String"
4. "Rock Steady"
5. "Black Coffee"
6. "Summer Rain"
7. "Chick Fit"
8. "Ratchet Behaviour"
9. "Red Flag"
10. "Lady Marmalade"
11. "This Is a War"
12. "War of Nerves"
13. "One Woman Man"
14. "Bootie Call"
15. "Who Hurt Who"
16. "Twentyfourseven
17. "Never Felt Like This Before"
18. "Don't Worry"
19. "Under the Bridge"
20. "Never Ever"
21. "One Strike"
22. "Pure Shores"

== Shows ==
List of concerts, showing date, city, country and venue
Date	City	Country	Venue
Europe
6 October 2016	Newcastle upon Tyne	England	O_{2} Academy Newcastle
7 October 2016	Glasgow	Scotland	O_{2} Academy Glasgow
8 October 2016	Manchester	England	Manchester Academy
10 October 2016	Bournemouth	England	O_{2} Academy Bournemouth
11 October 2016	Liverpool	England	O_{2} Academy Liverpool
13 October 2016	London	England	O_{2} Academy Brixton
14 October 2016	Birmingham	England	O_{2} Academy Birmingham
15 October 2016	Sheffield	England	O_{2} Academy Sheffield
17 October 2016	Westcliff-on-Sea	England	Cliffs Pavilion
18 October 2016	Norwich	England	The Nick Rayns LCR, University of East Anglia
Middle East
28 October 2016	Dubai	United Arab Emirates	Autism Rocks Arena
