= Rock Steady (All Saints song) =

2006 single by All Saints

Single by All Saints

from the album Studio 1
- B-side: "Dope Noize"; "Do Me"
- Released: 6 November 2006
- Recorded: 2006
- Studio: Mayfair (London, England)
- Genre: Pop; reggae-pop; R&B
- Length: 2:47
- Label: Parlophone
- Songwriters: Shaznay Lewis; Greg Kurstin
- Producer: Greg Kurstin

All Saints singles chronology
"All Hooked Up" (2001)	"Rock Steady" (2006)	"One Strike" (2016)

Music video
- "Rock Steady" on YouTube

"Rock Steady" is a song performed by English-Canadian recording girl group All Saints from their third studio album, Studio 1 (2006). It was co-written by group member Shaznay Lewis in collaboration with the track's producer Greg Kurstin. The song was released by Parlophone on 6 November 2006. All Saints collaborated with Kurstin on a number of songs; six were chosen for the album. "Rock Steady" was released as the first single from it. The song contains prominent 2 tone, dance-pop, reggae fusion, rocksteady and ska musical characteristics. It is lyrically influenced by the personalities of the group members themselves.

"Rock Steady" received mainly positive reviews from contemporary music critics. The song also garnered charting success for All Saints both in the United Kingdom and internationally. It debuted at number 11 on the UK Singles Chart before reaching a peak of number three the following week. It became All Saints' ninth consecutive top 10 hit in the United Kingdom. The single also garnered chart success internationally; peaking within the top 10 in the Czech Republic, Finland, Hungary and Spain, and the top 40 in several other countries.

The accompanying music video for "Rock Steady" was directed by W.I.Z. and it was released on 30 September 2006; it features the group acting as professional bank robbers. In order to promote the song, All Saints performed "Rock Steady" live on various television shows, including Ant & Dec's Saturday Night Takeaway, Popworld and Top of the Pops, and was subsequently performed on their Red Flag Tour (2016) and Testament Tour (2018).

== Background, release, and composition ==
All Saints announced in January 2006 that the group had officially reformed after splitting in 2001. On 20 September 2006, the group revealed that the title of their 'comeback single' was "Rock Steady" and that it would be released on 6 November, accompanied by two B-sides: "Dope Noize" and "Do Me". The song premiered on BBC Radio 1's The Chris Moyles Show on 21 September 2006. In Australia, a CD single was issued on 15 January 2007.

The song was produced by Greg Kurstin. Kurstin also performed all instrumentation involved in the song and, recorded and mixed the song at Mayfair Studios in London, England. John Hudson was Kurstin's recording assistant for the track and Jasper Irm, Simon Hayes and Toshi Minesaki were involved in its engineering. All backing vocals in the song are sung by group members Nicole Appleton and Natalie Appleton. "Rock Steady" was mastered by Geoff Pesche.

All Saints "Rock Steady"
A 20-second sample of "Rock Steady" featuring the chorus led by Shaznay Lewis backed by a dance-pop, reggae-influenced breakbeat.

The song is composed in the key of D minor, the beat is set in common time and moves at 136 beats per minute. "Rock Steady" features a different and new style in music in comparison to previous All Saints tracks. It is upbeat song which contains prominent elements of 2 tone, dance-pop, reggae fusion, rocksteady and ska music, and was described by the Huddersfield Daily Examiner as having "sassy reggae pop" musical characteristics. The song is constructed in verse-chorus form. The first verse is sung by Lewis and the second verse is sung by Nicole. Melanie Blatt leads the song's middle eight along with Natalie. All the verses are sung in call and response with the chorus being sung as a combined vocal by all group members with Lewis on lead.

=== Controversy ===
Surrounding the release of "Rock Steady" was controversy regarding its sound after Cheryl Tweedy from rival British girl group Girls Aloud accused the All Saints single of sounding like one of Girls Aloud's. In an interview with MTV UK, group member Blatt sarcastically responded to the accusation: "'Jump (for My Love)' is so where I wanna be. [...] We could only aspire and dream to be like them (Girls Aloud). Hopefully one day we will achieve that. For now, we will have to make do with copying them." In the same interview, Nicole responded: "We all have vaginas. That's about as similar as it gets." Lewis went on to say that she doesn't care what Girls Aloud thinks, referring to them as "stupid little girls". Lewis later substantiated her reference in another interview, saying:

We [All Saints] say what we want. As long as we stand true and say what we believe, it's fine. I stand by it and I mean it. If you [Cheryl] say things about people for any other reason you have to be careful because you will bump into them. So you'd better mean what you say. We are four feisty women with a lot of attitude. We're confident because we're older now. People forget they're not talking Girls Aloud or Sugababes – we're 30-odd-year-old women so we aren't dizzy anymore. It's not cockiness, it's maturity. The industry is so false and we know that but when you're younger you think it's the be all and end all.

However, Girls Aloud member Sarah Harding rubbished reports of the feud, saying: "[...] It was taken out of proportion, twisted and they [All Saints] retaliated. I actually had a drink with Natalie Appleton and Liam Gallagher the other week as we have a mutual friend – everything is fine, honestly."

== Critical reception ==
John Murphy from musicOMH was positive in his review of the song, saying it was a good example of how at ease the group sounded with their new direction. He called it "fresh and cool", and also complimented the Appleton sisters' backing vocals, noting they "fit in beautifully". Matthew Chisling of AllMusic described the song as a "kicking track" and "solid dance hit with enticing grooves". M. H. Lo of Stylus Magazine gave the track a nine out of ten rating, complimenting its "brilliantly insistent chorus" as well as its backing track, "the song will not leave your mind as long as you're willing to give it three spins. The golden age of British girl bands receives reinforcements". Virgin Media's Hamish Champ mentioned that "one can't help feeling that the quartet has made a conscious decision to move into Girls Aloud territory". Leon McDermott from the Sunday Herald also gave the song a positive review, saying: "An updated take on the sound they made their own, it adds cheeky nods to Jamaican-inspired two tone, ska and rock steady the genre that provides the title for their skanking, jumping comeback single".

However, the song was also criticised. Mickey McMonagle from Sunday Mail said there was "too much of the old Girls Aloud sound about this comeback single for me to get too excited", and that he expected something more fresh and exciting for the group's comeback. Paul Connolly from the Evening Standard mentioned that the song "does smack off cynicism, however. It sounds like a 50/50 splice of Girls Aloud's pop dynamism and Sugababes' slouchy thrift-shop R&B. It really doesn't do the girls any justice". He completed his review of the song saying it was not "a terrible song – it's just kind of pointless". Fraser McAlpine of the BBC Chart Blog gave the single a two-star rating, commenting that "the Saints are acting quite devilishly in pinching approximately 98.3% of their sound, mixing it with the dodgy checkered-trousered leftovers from the Ordinary Boys' Brassbound, and throwing in every single senseless lyric from every single girl band song ever".

== Chart performance ==
In the United Kingdom, "Rock Steady" debuted on the UK Singles Chart at number 11 on the issue dated 11 November 2006. It was the second highest new entry in the chart for that week, behind U2 and Green Day collaboration single "The Saints Are Coming", which debuted at number six. The chart debut of the song marked All Saints' first appearance on the chart since "All Hooked Up" (2001). The next week, it faced competition from rival girl band Sugababes' new single and "Easy", which also had debuted the previous week at number 30. On 18 November, the song climbed eight places to reach a peak of number three, outpeaking the Sugababes single who peaked at number eight for that week. "Rock Steady" spent ten weeks on the chart before exiting at number 65, on 13 January 2007. As of July 2018, the song was the group's eighth best selling single in the United Kingdom.

In Austria, "Rock Steady" debuted at number 67 on 17 November 2006, before peaking at number 20 on 22 December 2006. It spent a total of 12 weeks on the chart. The track debuted and peaked at number 10 in Finland, becoming the group's third top 10 hit there. "Rock Steady" debuted at number 40 in Hungary, but later peaked at number five on the chart issued for the sixth week of 2007; it spent 17 weeks on the chart. The song peaking at number 15 in Ireland, becoming All Saints' eighth top 20 hit in the country and spending a total of five weeks in the chart. "Rock Steady" peaked at number 16 in Italy and spent a total of four weeks in the chart. On 12 November 2006, "Rock Steady" debuted and peaked at number 10 in Spain, spending a total of three weeks on the chart. In Switzerland, it debuted at number 40 on 3 December 2006, later peaking at number 37 for two weeks, spending a total of 11 weeks on the chart.

== Music video ==
Natalie Appleton's eyes leaking blood in a scene from the song's music video.

Weeks of planning went into shooting the music video for "Rock Steady" in Cuba: booking flights for all staff, hiring equipment and arranging locations. However, All Saints were not able to sit together in first class travel to Cuba, they either had to "unacceptably" go on separate flights or sit in economy class and as a result the shoot for the music video was moved to Bucharest in Romania at the expense of Parlophone Records. It was directed by W.I.Z., who also directed the video for the group's 1998 single "War of Nerves". The video was also produced by Laura Kanerick. It was released exclusively through Yahoo! Launch on 30 September 2006.

The music video is set in black and white, with occasional streaks of yellow or red visible for dramatic emphasis. It begins with a consecutive, quick close-up of each group member. Natalie, first, is seen with tied-back hair and black sunglasses turning around. Lewis, second, is seen with loose hair removing her sunglasses. Nicole, third, is seen wearing a tilted black hat and a veil over her face. Blatt, last, is wearing a European-styled black cap with her hair curled to volume and is depicted throughout the video reading The Thief's Journal by Jean Genet. A scene is then focused around the atmosphere outside a fictional bank named "La Banca dei Fortunati", as the girls begin to arrive. The name of the bank director is "Benito Berlusconi".

The scene then shifts to an ATM where money is seen ejecting. Lewis and Nicole then walk into the bank holding whips. Natalie comes through another entrance with her glasses on her head. With security all around, Natalie acts innocent by pretending to be doing her make-up while she waits for Nicole and Lewis to act out the robbery. The latter ones are then seen sitting down at a table making a deal with the bank managers. At this stage, Natalie goes back outside and puts her sunglasses back on. She stares at one of the security guards as blood starts dripping underneath her sunglasses from her eyes to the extent that the ground enlarges in a circle of blood before the screen flashes out in red. In another scene, Nicole removes her hat, and begins crawling to escape the bank whilst Blatt is waiting outside. Natalie and Lewis are now in the bank area where they make use of a whip to frighten the civilians, who put their hands in the air and begin doing an almost robotic dance routine. The group then makes their escape via a motorcycle and side car.

== Live performances ==
All Saints performed "Rock Steady" live on Ant & Dec's Saturday Night Takeaway, on 21 October 2006. This was the first time the group performed live together in five years since their split in 2001. On 25 October 2006, All Saints performed the single live in a setlist of six songs, five from Studio 1 and signature hit single "Pure Shores" at the Sheperd's Bush Pavilion in London. The group wore black or white-coloured shirts teamed with big, loose-knotted ties. Before the show, Shaznay Lewis addressed the crowd saying "We're very nervous, you know" and Nicole Appleton said that she was "emotional" after the gig. Chris Elwell-Sutton of the Evening Standard reviewed the performance saying "'Rock Steady' was another energetic, commercially viable highlight". James McNair of The Independent gave the gig a five star rating, saying: "The superb new single 'Rock Steady' shifts things up a gear, All Saints nailing their dancehall influences to the mast and engaging in some neat, microphone-swapping choreography".

The single was then performed live on Popworld on 4 November as part of its promotion leading up to its release on 6 November. On 14 November, they appeared on Top of the Pops for a performance of the single. The girls also showed up at BBC's Children in Need on 17 November to perform the single. All Saints performed the song live as the opening act on The Chart Show on 18 November 2006, alongside acts like Girls Aloud and McFly. The group also performed "Pure Shores" at the event and the following was said about their performances: "They didn't disappoint [...] the party was now well under way." All Saints also performed "Rock Steady" on Channel 4's T4, aired on the same day.

"Rock Steady" was included on the setlist for their first headlining show in over a decade at London's KOKO, on 4 April 2016, and was performed as part of the setlist of their 2016 Red Flag Tour. All Saints also performed it on their Electric Brixton set in July 2018.

== Track listings ==
UK CD 1

1. "Rock Steady" – 2:47
2. "Dope Noize" – 3:54

UK CD 2

1. "Rock Steady" – 2:47
2. "Do Me" – 4:17
3. "Rock Steady" (Calvin Harris Remix) – 3:35
4. "Rock Steady" (Music Video) – 3:32

UK 12-inch single

1. "Rock Steady" (MSTRKRFT Edition) – 5:06
2. "Rock Steady" (Junkyard Mix) – 3:45
3. "Rock Steady" (K-Gee Reggae Bounce Remix) – 4:27

European 12-inch single

1. "Rock Steady" – 2:47
2. "Rock Steady" (Calvin Harris Remix) – 3:35
3. "Rock Steady" (MSTRKRFT Edition) – 5:06

Italian 12-inch single

1. "Rock Steady" (Junkyard Mix) – 3:45
2. "Rock Steady" (K-Gee Reggae Bounce Remix) – 4:27
3. "Rock Steady" (Calvin Harris Remix) – 3:35
4. "Rock Steady" (MSTRKRFT Edition) – 5:06

== Credits and personnel ==
- Songwriting – Shaznay Lewis, Greg Kurstin
- Production – Greg Kurstin
- Instruments and programming – Greg Kurstin
- Recording – Greg Kurstin, John Hudson
- Engineering – Jasper Irm, Simon Hayes, Toshi Minesaki
- Main vocals – Shaznay Lewis, Melanie Blatt, Natalie Appleton, Nicole Appleton
- Background vocals – Natalie Appleton, Nicole Appleton
- Mixing – Greg Kurstin
- Mastering – Geoff Pesche

== Charts ==
=== Weekly charts ===
Chart (2006–2007)	Peak position
Australia (ARIA)	98
Austria (Ö3 Austria Top 40)	20
Belgium (Ultratop 50 Flanders)	42
Belgium (Ultratip Bubbling Under Wallonia)	4
CIS Airplay (TopHit)	4
Czech Republic Airplay (ČNS IFPI)	8
Denmark Airplay (Tracklisten)	19
Europe (Eurochart Hot 100)	10
Finland (Suomen virallinen lista)	10
Germany (GfK)	40
Hungary (Rádiós Top 40)	5
Ireland (IRMA)	15
Italy (FIMI)	16
Netherlands (Dutch Top 40)	38
Netherlands (Single Top 100)	52
New Zealand (Recorded Music NZ)	38
Russia Airplay (TopHit)	3
Scottish Singles Sales (Official Charts)	5
Slovakia Airplay (ČNS IFPI)	12
Spain (Promusicae)	10
Sweden (Sverigetopplistan)	41
Switzerland (Schweizer Hitparade)	37
UK Singles (Official Charts)	3
UK Airplay (Music Week)	1

=== Year-end charts ===
Chart (2006)	Position
CIS Airplay (TopHit)	100
Russia Airplay (TopHit)	100
UK Singles (OCC)	91
UK Airplay (Music Week)	63

Chart (2007)	Position
CIS Airplay (TopHit)	72
Hungary (Rádiós Top 40)	49
Russia Airplay (TopHit)	67

=== Decade-end charts ===
Chart (2000–2009)	Position
Russia Airplay (TopHit)	134
