= Do Me Wrong =

Single by Mel Blatt
- Released: August 25, 2003
- Genre: R&B
- Length: 3:46
- Label: London Records
- Songwriters: Melanie Blatt, Brian Higgins, Stuart Zender
- Producers: Stuart Zender, Xenomania, Brian Higgins

Mel Blatt singles chronology
"I'm Leavin'" (2002)	"Do Me Wrong" (2003)	"See Me" (2005)

"Do Me Wrong" is the debut solo single by Melanie Blatt of All Saints, credited as Mel Blatt on the single cover. It peaked at #18 in the UK charts.

== Track list ==
#	Title	Length
CD 1
1.	"Do Me Wrong" (Original Mix)	3:46
2.	"Do Me Wrong" (G-Town Radio Edit)	4:10
3.	"Do Me Wrong" (Roguetraders Radio Edit)	3:17
4.	"Do Me Wrong" (Video)	4:07
CD 2
1.	"Do Me Wrong" (Original Mix)	3:46
2.	"The Boy and I"	3:44
3.	"My Everything"	4:24

== Charts ==
Chart (2003)	Position
UK Singles (OCC)	18

== Video ==
The video, directed by Si&Ad (that is Simon Atkinson and Adam Townley), is based on the G Town Radio Edit of the song and features Melanie Blatt in a car in the desert in Spain trying to get away from her unfaithful boyfriend.

== Remixes ==
Do Me Wrong

- Extended Version
- G Town Radio Edit
- Nu G Town Radio Edit
- Roguetraders Dub
- Roguetraders Radio Edit
- Roguetraders Vocal 12 inch
- Themroc 12 inch Dub
- Themroc 12 inch Vocal Mix
