= Love Lasts Forever (All Saints song) =

Single by All Saints

from the album Testament
- Released: 31 May 2018
- Genre: Electropop
- Length: 4:06
- Label: AS
- Songwriter(s): Shaznay Lewis; Karl Clive Gordon
- Producer(s): Karl "K-Gee" Gordon

All Saints singles chronology
| "One Woman Man" (2016) | "Love Lasts Forever" (2018) | "After All" (2018) |

Music video
- "Love Lasts Forever" on YouTube

"Love Lasts Forever" is a song by English girl group All Saints from their fifth studio album, Testament (2018). Written by group member Shaznay Lewis and producer K-Gee, it premiered as the album's lead single on BBC Radio 2's The Chris Evans Breakfast Show on 31 May 2018.

== Writing and inspiration ==
Shaznay Lewis wrote "Love Lasts Forever" with producer K-Gee more than a year prior to its release. It was inspired by Lewis' son who was about to leave high school, and reflected on the pressure from society to grow and achieve. She wanted to reassure him that "the family will be here and the love will still be here whenever you need to come back and be protected from all of that." Melanie Blatt listened to the track for four hours on repeat after Lewis sent it to her, and recalls it being the first from Testament that she instantly liked and thought "we're fine, this is good, this album is going to be amazing."

== Release and reception ==
"Love Lasts Forever" was released as the album's lead single on 31 May 2018, after Lewis and Nicole Appleton appeared on BBC Radio 2's The Chris Evans Breakfast Show for its radio premiere. It was added to Spotify's New Music Friday and Apple Music's Best of the Week playlists upon release. On 8 June 2018, an extended play featuring five remixes was released. The song became a radio hit in the UK, according to the Official Charts Company. It was playlisted by BBC Radio 2 and peaked at number 33 on the UK Airplay Chart.

=== Critical response ===
"Love Lasts Forever" received generally positive reviews from music critics. Andre Paine of the Evening Standard commented, "The combination of steely harmonies and lush electronic textures is an appealing throwback". Jonathan Wright of God is in the TV believed it continued the group's "impeccable run of singles". In The Observer, Phil Mongredien said the track "displays a deliciously light touch". The Independent's Elizabeth Aubrey appreciated its "layered and multi-faceted" sound.

Michael Cragg of Q magazine found the song "sun-kissed" and cited it as an exception on Testament where "songs are often suffocated by vaguely outré production flourishes". In his review for The Guardian, Cragg wrote that the group's "icy harmonies keep this springy love fest about an inch away from full Emeli Sandé." Laura Snapes, also writing in The Guardian, derided the production, saying All Saints are "left eating dust by breathless drum'n'bass breakdowns". In 2018, the song was shortlisted for the Popjustice £20 Music Prize.

== Live performances ==
All Saints performed the song on This Morning on 1 August 2018. On 9 September 2018, the group performed "Love Lasts Forever" at Radio 2 Live in Hyde Park. The track was also performed on their 2018 Testament Tour.

== Track listing ==
Digital download
| No. | Title | Length |
|---|---|---|
| 1. | "Love Lasts Forever" | 4:06 |

Digital download (Remixes)
| No. | Title | Length |
|---|---|---|
| 1. | "Love Lasts Forever" (Castle Remix) | 3:42 |
| 2. | "Love Lasts Forever" (Pink Panda Extended Vocal Mix) | 4:49 |
| 3. | "Love Lasts Forever" (Matt Jam Lamont Vocal Remix) | 5:08 |
| 4. | "Love Lasts Forever" (Pink Panda Extended Dub Mix) | 4:50 |
| 5. | "Love Lasts Forever" (Matt Jam Lamont Dub) | 5:08 |

== Charts ==
Chart performance for "Love Lasts Forever"
| Chart (2018) | Peak position |
|---|---|
| UK Radio Airplay (Official Charts Company) | 33 |
