= Julienne Davis =

American actress

- Born: September 26, 1963 (age 63); Los Angeles, California, U.S.
- Occupations: Actress; singer; model
- Website: juliennedavis.com

Julienne Davis (born September 26, 1963) (Note: While some sources state Davis was born September 26, 1973, she clarified in a 2024 interview that her birthdate is in fact September 26, 1963, and that she had intentionally reduced her age by ten years in the media and on her acting resumé.) is an American actress, singer, and model.

== Early life ==
Davis was born in Los Angeles, California. When she was seventeen, she left home to pursue a career in classical ballet in New York but after finding she was too tall to audition for corps de ballet she decided to become a fashion model instead. She has Yankton Dakota ancestry through her mother.

== Career ==
Davis began her career as a model, primarily in Europe, where she modeled for the Italian fashion house Pirelli and the England hosiery company Gossard.

In 1993, Davis was a singer in the short-lived duo Drive with Melanie Blatt, who released the single "Curfew".

Davis' acting credits include the role of "Mandy" in Eyes Wide Shut, Tabloid, House of 9, and The Bill, as well as being a main cast member of the British television series Too Much Sun. She also appeared in an advertisement for Carling beer. Prior to acting, she worked as a fashion model for print, editorial, and catalogues, most notably for Gossard Bras and the Pirelli Calendar. Davis is co-writer, co-producer, and lead vocalist for the band Sophisticated Savage.

In 2016, Davis wrote for a right-of-center political magazine, "coming out" as a conservative in Hollywood. She is a Christian and has been called "one of Hollywood’s leading Republicans". She currently resides in Pasadena, California, with her husband Jay Strongman.

== Filmography ==
Film

Year	Title	Role(s)	Director	Notes
1999	Eyes Wide Shut	Amanda 'Mandy' Curran	Stanley Kubrick	Feature film debut
2001	Tabloid	TV show hostess	David Blair	Credited as Trolley Gardner
2005	House of 9	Cynthia	Steven R. Monroe	
2010	Breathe	Detective Toni Foster	Lonny Stevens	Short film
2014	The Session	Renee Stratton	Laura Russo	Short film
2015	Guilt Trippin'	Woman	Laura Russo	Short film
2016	Going Together	Melinda	Sophie Webb	Short film

Television

Year	Title	Role	Notes
1999	Trail of Guilt	Daniella	1 episode: "The Acid House"
2000	Urban Gothic	Emmanuelle	1 episode: "Vampirology"
2000	Too Much Sun	Kimberley	Regular role
2002	Come Together	Sally	TV movie
2002	The Bill	Rachel Johnson	1 episode: "Down a Blind Alley (001)"
2010	Beach Town	Herself	Host
2014	Tinker Steampunk	Lady Cushing	1 episode: "The Telephone Rang"
2015	Unusual Suspects	Polygraph Expert	1 episode: "Flames in Paradise"
2015	My Crazy Ex	Grace	1 episode: "Slander, Dander and Pander"
2020	Unreported World	Herself	1 episode: "Trump's Housewives"
