= See Me (song) =

Single by Melanie Blatt

from the album Robots: Original Motion Picture Soundtrack
- Released: April 11, 2005
- Recorded: Electric Landlady; Sphere Studios
- Genre: Pop
- Length: 3:48
- Label: Swolen Ankle Ltd
- Songwriters: Melanie Blatt; Stuart Zender; Femi Fem
- Producer: Stuart Zender

Melanie Blatt singles chronology
"Do Me Wrong" (2003)	"See Me" (2005)

"See Me" is a single by the English singer Melanie Blatt for the 2005 Blue Sky Studios film Robots. Released on 11 April 2005, "See Me" peaked at #78 in the UK charts. While the single was not featured on the soundtrack to Robots, it was used in the end credits of the film's UK release.

== Music video ==
The video of the single includes footage from Robots that intercut to scenes of Melanie, on a black background, dressed in different outfits, including a white suit with the left side of her body covered in silver diamonds, representing a cyborg. She can also be seen singing in a ball chair or on a bed as scenes from the movie play within the surfaces.

== Track listing ==
#	Title	Length
1.	"See Me"	3:48
2.	"What Went Wrong"	4:57

== Song information ==
Instrument	Performed by
Lyrics and music	Melanie Blatt, Stuart Zender and Femi Fem
All instruments and production	Stuart Zender

== Charts ==
Chart (2005)	Peak position
UK Singles Chart	78
