= Red Flag (album) =

2016 studio album by All Saints

Studio album by All Saints
- Released: 8 April 2016
- Recorded: 2014–2016
- Genres: Pop; R&B
- Length: 47:36
- Label: London
- Producers: Karl "K-Gee" Gordon; Fred Ball; Hutch; the Invisible Men; Sacha Skarbek; Utters

All Saints chronology
Studio 1 (2006)	Red Flag (2016)	Testament (2018)

Singles from Red Flag
- 1. "One Strike" Released: 23 February 2016; 2. "This Is a War" Released: 13 May 2016; 3. "One Woman Man" Released: 7 October 2016

Red Flag is the fourth studio album by English girl group All Saints. It was released on 8 April 2016, by London Records, which relaunched especially for the project. It serves as the group's comeback album, their first in nearly a decade, following the release of 2006's Studio 1, which resulted in them being dropped by Parlophone. A string of live performances and touring with the Backstreet Boys in 2014 sparked interest within the group to reform and record Red Flag. All Saints collaborated with producers Karl "K-Gee" Gordon, Hutch, The Invisible Men, Fred Ball, and Utters for the album.

The album received positive reviews from music critics with some even considering it their best work yet. It was a success in the United Kingdom, where it debuted at number three on the UK Album Chart. Red Flag was preceded by the release of "One Strike" as its lead single on 23 February 2016. To further promote the album, All Saints played a headlining gig at London's KOKO on 4 April 2016 and embarked on their first headlining tour in 15 years, the Red Flag Tour, in October 2016.

== Background ==
In 2007, All Saints were dropped by Parlophone following lacklustre sales of their third studio album, Studio 1. Two years later, group member Melanie Blatt declared that All Saints would be "never ever getting back together again". A limited release of the group's third compilation album, Pure Shores: The Very Best of All Saints, was commissioned by Music Club Deluxe in September 2010. The group were approached to star in the second series of The Big Reunion, but promptly declined the offer in April 2013. Unexpectedly the following year, All Saints were invited to perform as special guests for five dates of the Backstreet Boys' In a World Like This Tour in Ireland and the UK. Their tour dates ran from 26 March to 5 April 2014. Although All Saints made no money from the tour and funded their sets themselves, they saw it as an opportunity to do what they enjoyed the most and did the least, describing the experience as "refreshing" and "money well spent". It ultimately sparked interest within the group to pursue a new studio album and full-scale comeback; group member Natalie Appleton explained: "We thought we'd just do it for a laugh, but then we just didn't want it to end. We liked being together. We wanted to be together. I mean we hang out anyway, but we wanted to be together in this world."

All Saints went on to perform additional gigs at G-A-Y, Manchester Pride and the V Festival that year. The string of live performances were viewed as a triumphant return for the group and prompted much reunion speculation. A promotional video was shared by All Saints on social media in June 2015, suggesting an upcoming project and tour. Similarly, on 1 January 2016, the group posted a promotional image of themselves looking upwards in front of a grey background with the text "2016".

== Writing and recording ==
We didn't force ourselves into this situation and it couldn't have happened at a better time in all of our lives. I just missed being with the girls. It makes us happy.

— Natalie Appleton

Writing and recording of Red Flag began in April 2014 after the In a World Like This Tour. All Saints decided that they would not pursue a studio album had they not believed in the music they recorded. This was especially important for Blatt who considered the Studio 1 era and Parlophone contract fraudulent. In an interview for i-D, group member Shaznay Lewis said the comeback was about the group's relationship with each other and "nothing to do with the industry, or making money, or selling records". Unlike with the group's previous albums, Red Flag's recording happened casually and on good terms; Lewis stated it would have been completed "a lot quicker if [the group] spent less time joking around while making it".

Red Flag was the first album to be entirely arranged by the group with no record label input. Prior to its development, Lewis had taken notice of a new producer, Hutch, whose work she loved and saw the album as the ideal opportunity for a collaboration with him. The group also approached other producers including, Utters and The Invisible Men, and K-Gee who had produced much of their back catalogue. K-Gee insisted that All Saints worked with other producers before working with him and consequently became the record's executive producer. The track listing was ordered from the first track the group recorded for the album to the last. A total of 20 songs were recorded with eight later recordings not making the cut. The group became so involved during the recording and development process that they kept returning for additional sessions and further fine-tuning. Only when the album was complete did they seek investors and a label for the project.

Most tracks on Red Flag were written by Lewis with themes very personal to the group. They were written with a significantly more mature perspective than that of the group's previous releases. In an interview for The Observer, Lewis explained: "Because we're old enough to know that hey, life's not perfect, and it's not like: 'I'm in love and nothing bad will ever happen to me …' No. Shit happens." "One Strike" was inspired by the breakdown of group member Nicole Appleton's highly publicised marriage to Oasis and Beady Eye band member Liam Gallagher. It details Nicole's emotions when it was revealed to her that Gallagher had an affair and was expecting a child with American journalist Liza Ghorbani. Blatt cited Red Flag as the group's best output and her favourite All Saints album and the one she "always wanted [them] to make", while Lewis said it "couldn't feel any more right".

== Release ==
All Saints initially planned to start up their own record label for the release of Red Flag, however, their former label London Records decided to relaunch especially for the project. On 27 January 2016, the group announced that Red Flag would be released on 8 April 2016. Each member took to Twitter the same day to post red flag emojis. The album was made available for pre-order on 23 February 2016. Signed CDs were made available for pre-order exclusively to Amazon.co.uk.

== Promotion ==
To promote Red Flag, All Saints appeared on Alan Carr: Chatty Man for an interview and a performance of "One Strike" on 17 March 2016. The group then played their first headlining show in over a decade at London's KOKO on 4 April 2016. The show was a critical and commercial success; it received praise from reviewers for The Daily Telegraph and The Guardian, and tickets sold out in one minute. The group were scheduled to further promote the album with performances at G-A-Y on 18 April 2016, the Chipping Norton Music Festival on 9 July 2016 and at the V Festival on 20 August 2016. They also embarked on their first headlining tour in 15 years, the Red Flag Tour, in support of the album. Tickets for the tour were first made available on 16 March 2016 through an exclusive fan pre-sale on the group's website for its newsletter subscribers, and then later through Gigsandtours.com on 18 March 2016 at 09:00 BST. The Red Flag Tour visited 10 British cities throughout October 2016, beginning in Newcastle upon Tyne and ending in Norwich.

=== Singles ===
"One Strike" was released as the lead single from Red Flag mid-week on 23 February 2016. It bowed at number 198 initially on the UK Singles Chart, and re-entered at number 115 after the release of Red Flag. It also received rave reviews from critics. "One Woman Man" was released as the first promotional single from the album on 18 March 2016, peaking at number 192 on the UK Singles Chart. "This Is a War" followed as the second and final promotional single on 1 April 2016. Later, "This Is a War" was eventually announced as the album's second single. On 13 May 2016, a remixes EP was released on the iTunes Store, as well as on Spotify. The music video for the song was released on 8 June 2016.

== Critical reception ==
Professional ratings
Aggregate scores
Source	Rating
AnyDecentMusic?	6.9/10
Metacritic	68/100
Review scores
Source	Rating
AllMusic	3.5/5 stars
Exclaim!	8/10
The Guardian	3/5 stars
MusicOMH	3.5/5 stars
NME	3/5 stars
The Observer	4/5 stars
PopMatters	6/10
Q	3/5 stars
Spin	8/10
The Times	3/5 stars

Red Flag received generally positive reviews from music critics. At Metacritic, which assigns a normalised rating out of 100 to reviews from mainstream publications, the album received an average score of 68, based on 9 reviews. Writing for Q, David Quantick called it the best album of the group's career, writing, "Unlike previous efforts, which have relied on a standout moment [...], Red Flag is both consistent and memorable." Yasmine Shemesh of Exclaim! also regarded it as All Saints' best album, noting that it triumphed by being entirely contemporary while still having the group's trademark sound. Similarly, John Murphy of MusicOMH commended the group's ability to remain contemporary after a decade's absence and considered the album a more genuine follow-up to their 2000 album Saints & Sinners than 2006's Studio 1. AllMusic's Neil Z. Yeung wrote that All Saints grew with confidence and prospered with their harmonizing. Brennan Carley of Spin magazine deemed it "a mature but still totally floor-ready return", while Michael Cragg of The Observer felt it was "expertly judged" and "a sassy and soulful return to form".

Other reviewers were critical of the album's latter half. Leonie Cooper of the NME noted a large drop in quality after the track "Summer Rain", ultimately calling Red Flag equally thrilling and disappointing. While impressed by "One Strike" and "One Woman Man", Harriet Gibsone of The Guardian said the album was beset by "rogue energies" and "mellow ballads of varying degrees of schmaltz". In his review for The Times, Will Hodgkinson wrote that Red Flag had "some awful filler", but appreciated its genuine musicianship and called it "a far from disgraceful return". Richard Folland of PopMatters found the second half weaker, dismissing its R&B-influenced style as anonymity, but complimented the album's maturity and variety. He concluded that the group's complementary harmonies "can conjure an esoteric kind of pop magic" and that they "can still create a sound which few if any of their peers can match." Digital Spy placed Red Flag at number 19 in their list of the 20 best albums of 2016.

== Chart performance ==
Red Flag debuted at number three on the UK Albums Chart with first-week sales of 9,298 units, behind The Lumineers' Cleopatra and Adele's 25. It dropped to number 24 in its second week with sales of 3,056 units.

== Track listing ==
Red Flag track listing
No.	Title	Writer(s)	Producer(s)	Length
1.	"One Strike"	Shaznay Lewis; Pete Hutchings	Hutch	3:33
2.	"One Woman Man"	Lewis; Dan Radclyffe	Utters; Karl "K-Gee" Gordon^{[a]}	4:01
3.	"Make U Love Me"	Lewis; James Dring; Jody Street	Gordon	3:46
4.	"Summer Rain"	Lewis; Fred Ball	Ball^{[b]}; Gordon^{[b]}	3:43
5.	"This Is a War"	Lewis; Jonny Coffer; Jonathan Lipsey	Gordon; Jonny Rockstar^{[c]}	4:49
6.	"Who Hurt Who"	Melanie Blatt; Sacha Skarbek	Skarbek	4:00
7.	"Puppet on a String"	Lewis; Ball	Ball	3:24
8.	"Fear"	Lewis; George Astasio; Jason Pebworth; Jon Shave	The Invisible Men; Draper	3:56
9.	"Ratchet Behaviour"	Lewis; Gordon; Cleopatra Humphrey; Lexie Lee	Gordon	3:54
10.	"Red Flag"	Lewis; Gordon	Gordon	4:19
11.	"Tribal"	Lewis; Gordon	Gordon	4:05
12.	"Pieces"	Lewis; Gordon	Gordon	4:06
Total length:				47:36

Notes

- ^{^a} signifies an additional producer
- ^{^b} signifies a co-producer
- ^{^c} signifies a vocal producer

== Charts ==
Weekly chart performance for Red Flag
Chart (2016)	Peak position
Australian Albums (ARIA)	77
Belgian Albums (Ultratop Flanders)	104
Belgian Albums (Ultratop Wallonia)	73
Dutch Albums (Album Top 100)	89
Irish Albums (IRMA)	29
Scottish Albums (Official Charts)	6
Swiss Albums (Schweizer Hitparade)	70
UK Albums (Official Charts)	3
