= Studio 1 (album) =

2006 studio album by All Saints

Studio album by All Saints
- Released: 5 November 2006
- Studios: Mayfair (London, England)
- Genres: Pop; reggae; R&B
- Length: 42:53
- Label: Parlophone
- Producers: The Amsterdamagers; Liam Howlett; K-Gee; Greg Kurstin; Rick Nowels

All Saints chronology
All Hits (2001)	Studio 1 (2006)	Red Flag (2016)

Singles from All Saints
- 1. "Rock Steady" Released: 6 November 2006

Studio 1 is the third studio album by English girl group All Saints, released on 10 November 2006, by Parlophone. Conceived after a five-year hiatus during which the bandmembers had pursued solo careers, the band reunited with frequent collaborator Karl "K-Gee" Gordon to work on the album, with producers The Amsterdamagers, Liam Howlett, Greg Kurstin, and Rick Nowels also contributing. Taking their sound into the reggae genre, the band members co-wrote on all songs on the album.

The album received mixed reviews, with some critics praising its fresh R&B, reggae, and ska influences and consistency, while others found it lacking strong songs, emotional depth, and originality. Upon its release, it underperformed, debuting and peaking at number 40 on the UK Albums Chart, though it has since reached Gold status in the United Kingdom. Studio 1's lead single, "Rock Steady", was released on 6 November 2006 and peaked at number three on the UK singles chart. A planned follow-up single, "Chick Fit", was released as a download-only promotional single.

== Background ==
In February 2001, All Saints announced that they were to take a break so that they "could clear the air between themselves". Melanie Blatt said later that year that it was uncertain if they would reform, citing their difficulties with the financial and business aspects of the group. Shaznay Lewis later explained that the catalyst for the break-up was a disagreement over who would wear a certain jacket for a photoshoot: "I would never in a million years have put money on the group ending over a jacket incident. But when that incident happened, it fired up so strong, it had to be over. And the way I was then, the state we'd got into then, there was no way she was getting that stupid jacket." In November 2001, London Records released a greatest hits compilation entitled All Hits. The album peaked at number eighteen on the UK Albums Chart and was later certified gold, selling 100,000 copies.

On 24 January 2006, it was announced that the band had reformed and signed a record deal with Parlophone. Blatt remarked: "I didn't know what to expect. Would it be the same? Would it be worse? But it was actually better, because we've all grown up." In a 2012 interview with i-D magazine, Blatt reflected that the reunion had not been done for the "right reasons", admitting that she participated primarily for the money, further elaborating: "We got signed before we had even made music again, it wasn't like we felt we had something to give back to the world [...] we were given an opportunity and took it, without really thinking about it too hard". She also said she never felt comfortable with the success the band had and that "it was not necessarily the plan at the beginning; there was a lot of compromise involved". She later stated in 2016 with the same publication: "Because you know what, we got signed [to Parlophone] having not made one piece of music. They signed the idea of us getting back together. I felt fraudulent from that moment on and it didn't feel like a real thing".

== Music ==
Studio 1 bears the All Saints' signature sound, a blend of pop, hip hop, R&B and a bit of rock. "Hell No" was penned by Shaznay Lewis and Karl "K-Gee" Gordon. "Tell me who's that bitch I see climbing out your window", they sing. "Too Nasty" is a "wayward" reggae song about indignation.

== Promotion ==
To promote Studio 1, All Saints performed "Rock Steady" live on Ant & Dec's Saturday Night Takeaway, on 21 October 2006. This was the first time the group performed live together in five years since their split in 2001. On 25 October 2006, All Saints performed the single live in a setlist of six songs, five from Studio 1 and signature hit single "Pure Shores" at the Sheperd's Bush Pavilion in London. The group wore black or white-coloured shirts teamed with big, loose-knotted ties. Before the show, Shaznay Lewis addressed the crowd saying "We're very nervous, you know" and Nicole Appleton said that she was "emotional" after the gig. Chris Elwell-Sutton of the Evening Standard reviewed the performance saying:

All Saints are back in the groove. [...] All Saints did a good job showcasing some strong new material. [...] Forthcoming single 'Rock Steady' was another energetic, commercially viable highlight. They looked tired at times, especially Mel Blatt, who perspired heavily under the lights, and while their routines were competent, serious questions have to be asked about their live skills, with accusations of miming rumbling frequently around the room. Luckily for All Saints, this didn't feel like a symptom of decline, having always employed minimal physical effort, simple choreography, and heavily produced vocals. All Saints are not natural live performers, but against the odds, last night's showing provided some optimism about their comeback potential.

Eva Simpson and Caroline Hedley of the Daily Mirror said that the group "put on one hell of a show". James McNair of The Independent gave the gig a five star rating, saying: "The superb new single 'Rock Steady' shifts things up a gear, All Saints nailing their dancehall influences to the mast and engaging in some neat, microphone-swapping choreography. [...] Watch out, Pussycat Dolls."

The single was then performed live on Popworld on 4 November as part of its promotion leading up to its release on 6 November. On 14 November, they appeared on Top of the Pops for a performance of the single. The girls also showed up at BBC's Children in Need on 17 November to perform the single. All Saints performed the song live as the opening act on The Chart Show on 18 November 2006, alongside acts like Girls Aloud and McFly. The group also performed "Pure Shores" at the event and the following was said about their performances: "They didn't disappoint [...] the party was now well under way." All Saints also performed several tracks on Channel 4's T4, aired on the same day. They also planned a tour to promote the album; however, it did not come to fruition.

== Critical reception ==
Professional ratings
Review scores
Source	Rating
AllMusic	3/5 stars
Evening Standard	1/5 stars
The Guardian	4/5 stars
MusicOMH	3/5 stars
Time Out	4/6 stars
Virgin Media	2/5 stars

Studio 1 received mixed reviews from music critics. Caroline Sullivan from The Guardian gave the album 4 out of 5 stars, writing: "Studio 1 offers a fresh take on their girl-group style. Always R&B-inclined, their harmonies are now judiciously seasoned with reggae and ska." John Murphy from MusicOMH commented: "Studio 1, despite not bearing much resemblance to the All Saints of yore, will be snapped up eagerly by those who remember them fondly in their heyday. Yet it's unclear who else this will appeal to really – while it's a pleasant enough listen for the most part, there aren't enough strong songs for it to really grab the attention." Time Out critic Eddy Lawrence called Studio 1 the band "most consistent album of their career." He found that it was "surprisingly innovative".

In a more mixed review, Kitty Empire from The Observer perceived that "despite some flickers of interest – on 'Chick Fit' and 'Hell No' in particular – too much of Studio 1 happens in a thin, tinny place." Matthew Chisling from AllMusic wrote that "Unfortunately, while all the music is appealing, it lacks personality and character. The tracks, all composed by Shaznay Lewis and Greg Kurstin, bear no emotional value, and the girls' voices are indistinguishable from one another and digitally enhanced to the point of obscurity." Hamish Champ from Virgin Media gave the album 2 out of 5 stars, writing that "the album sounds like an attempt to show that while they may be mums now they can still strut their funky stuff. It works, more or less, but the nagging feeling remains that others have entered the musical arena in the intervening years and have stolen the girls' pop tiaras." In a negative review for The Evening Standard, John Aizlewood called the album "jaw-droppingly dreadful."

== Commercial performance ==
During the week of the album's release, Studio 1 faced a chart battle against George Michael's Twenty Five and the Sugababes' Overloaded: The Singles Collection. Although the media predicted sales would be "very close", Studio 1 entered the UK Albums Chart at number 40, falling significantly short of the success of "Rock Steady" and the group's previous releases. Despite its lack of chart success, the album has shipped over 100,000 copies according to the British Phonographic Industry (BPI), being certified Gold.

== Track listing ==
Studio 1 track listing
No.	Title	Writer(s)	Producer(s)	Length
1.	"Rock Steady"	Shaznay Lewis; Greg Kurstin	Kurstin	2:44
2.	"Chick Fit"	Lewis; Rick Nowels	Nowels	3:33
3.	"On and On"	Lewis; Kurstin	Kurstin	3:59
4.	"Scar"	Melanie Blatt; Karl "K-Gee" Gordon	K-Gee	3:50
5.	"Not Eazy"	Lewis; Kurstin	Kurstin	3:17
6.	"Hell No"	Lewis; K-Gee	K-Gee	3:40
7.	"One Me and U"	Lewis; Kurstin	Kurstin	3:36
8.	"Headlock"	Lewis; Kurstin	Kurstin	3:31
9.	"Too Nasty"	Blatt; Nicole Appleton; K-Gee	K-Gee	3:55
10.	"In It to Win It"	Lewis; Kurstin	Kurstin	3:41
11.	"Flashback"	Natalie Appleton; Amanda Ghost; Liam Howlett; Ian Dench	Howlett; The Amsterdamagers	3:01
12.	"Fundamental"	Lewis; K-Gee	K-Gee	3:48
Total length:				42:53

Japanese bonus tracks
No.	Title	Writer(s)	Producer(s)	Length
13.	"Dope Noize"	Blatt; K-Gee	K-Gee	3:53
14.	"Do Me"	Lewis; K-Gee; Steve Octave	K-Gee	4:16

Special edition DVD
No.	Title	Writer(s)	Producer(s)	Length
1.	"All Saints interview"			22:24
2.	"Rock Steady" (music video)			2:44
3.	"Sexy"	Lewis; Kurstin	Kurstin	3:41

== Charts ==
Weekly chart performance for Studio 1
Chart (2006)	Peak position
Irish Albums (IRMA)	85
Scottish Albums (OCC)	45
Swiss Albums (Schweizer Hitparade)	73
UK Albums (OCC)	40

== Certifications ==
Certifications for Studio 1
Region	Certification	Certified units/sales
United Kingdom (BPI)	Gold	100,000^{^}
^{^} Shipments figures based on certification alone.

== Release history ==
Studio 1 release history
Region	Date
Ireland	10 November 2006
Europe	13 November 2006
Australia	25 November 2006
Brazil	5 December 2006
Mexico	5 December 2006
