= All Saints (group) =

British girl group

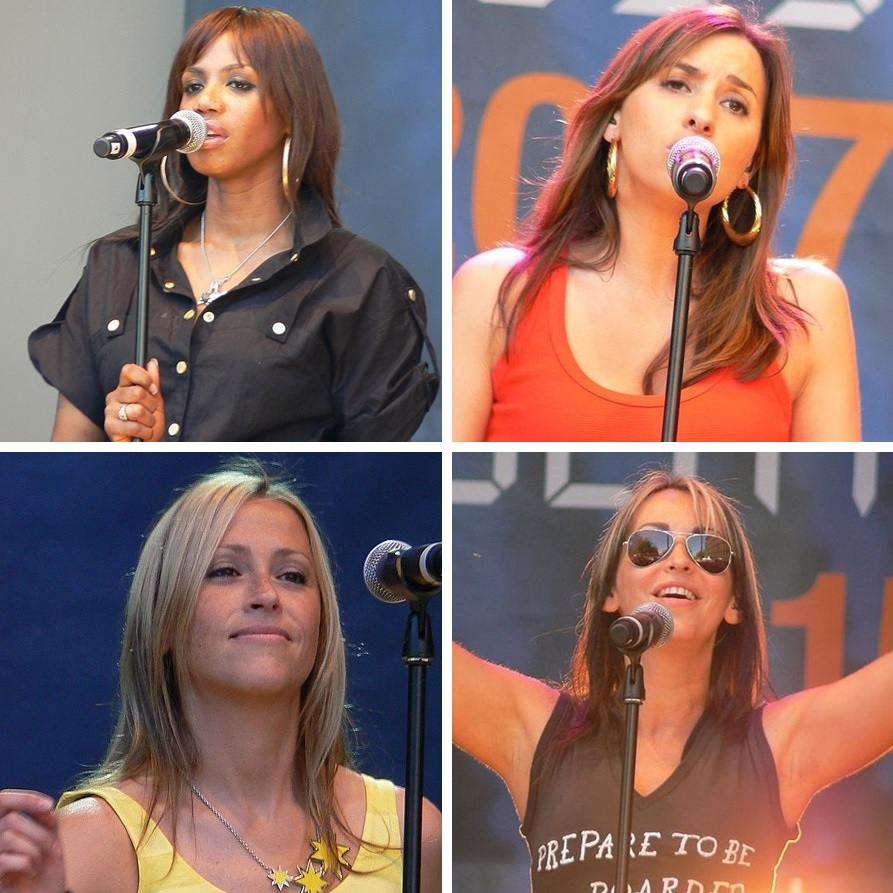
- All Saints performing in 2007. Clockwise from top left: Shaznay Lewis, Melanie Blatt, Natalie Appleton and Nicole Appleton.

Background information
- Also known as: All Saints 1.9.7.5.
- Origin: London, England
- Genres: Pop; R&B
- Works: All Saints discography
- Years active: 1993–2001; 2006–2008; 2013–2022 (Note: Indefinite hiatus)
- Labels: ZTT; London; Parlophone
- Past members: Natalie Appleton; Nicole Appleton; Melanie Blatt; Shaznay Lewis; Simone Rainford
- Website: allsaintsofficial.co.uk

All Saints were an English girl group formed in London in 1993. They were founded as All Saints 1.9.7.5. with members Melanie Blatt, Shaznay Lewis, and Simone Rainford. The group struggled to find commercial success upon being signed to ZTT Records and were dropped by the label shortly after Rainford left the group due to a power struggle with Lewis. In 1996, the group were joined by sisters Nicole and Natalie Appleton and signed to London Records under their shortened name.

As part of the 1990s wave of British girl groups, they peaked at number two on the UK Albums Chart with their self-titled debut album (1997), which became the UK's third-best-selling girl group album of all time to date. The album contained three UK number-one singles: "Never Ever", "Under the Bridge"/"Lady Marmalade" and "Bootie Call". "Never Ever" is the third-best-selling girl-group single in the UK, behind the Spice Girls' "Wannabe" and "Shout Out to My Ex" by Little Mix. It also won two Brit Awards: Best British Single and Best British Video, and the group were nominated for Best British Breakthrough Act. Their second album, Saints & Sinners (2000), became their first UK number-one album and achieved multi-platinum success. It included the UK number-one singles "Pure Shores" and "Black Coffee". Amid in-fighting among the group members, All Saints disbanded the following year.

The group later reformed after signing to Parlophone Records to release their third album, Studio 1 (2006). However, the album bowed at number 40 in the United Kingdom and All Saints were dropped by their label shortly afterwards. Following a second split in 2008, the group reunited in 2013 for a series of live performances, prompting the group to release of Red Flag (2016), and Testament (2018). As of January 2016, All Saints have sold 12 million records. Musicians including Jessy Lanza and Charli XCX have cited All Saints as an influence on their work. The group's influence on British fashion in the late 1990s has been noted, particularly their signature style of cargo pants in promotional imagery and live appearances.

== History ==
=== 1993–1996: Formation and line-up changes ===
Melanie Blatt and Shaznay Lewis started their career by singing backing vocals at Sarm West Studios, the ZTT recording studios near All Saints Road, London. In 1993, Blatt, Lewis and Simone Rainford were signed to ZTT Records, and Sugababes music manager Ron Tom decided the trio should become a group. "One of the names was Spice, but we didn't think it was good enough" admitted Simone. Some of the others names they considered included Slinky and Shifty, but ended up calling themselves All Saints 1.9.7.5. after the recording studio and the year of their births. They were launched as a trio for their first time at the Touch Magazine stage at the Notting Hill Carnival. But the problems started when the trio could not decide on what kind of music they wanted to make. They released their first single in 1994, "Silver Shadow", but it only peaked in the lower regions of the charts. Additionally, Rainford was not getting along very well with the other girls, and subsequently left the group in 1995. After one more release, the remaining duo was dropped by ZTT Records.

Regardless, Blatt and Lewis set out to find a replacement for Rainford. Conducting many auditions, Blatt's father, a taxi driver at the time, met Nicole Appleton in May 1996 whom Blatt knew from her days at the Sylvia Young Theatre School. However, Blatt was too embarrassed to ask Appleton to join the band, so she left it to the normally shy Lewis to ask her. "We gave her the low-down on everything and played her some demos, which she loved", she said. "She sang to me in the bathroom of a restaurant and we knew right away she'd be perfect. I was like, 'Cool! She can join!' And that was that". Nicole's older sister, Natalie Appleton, at first pondered with the idea of becoming the band's manager. However, it seemed natural that she should be a part of it, according to Lewis. Natalie had to be persuaded to join the band, because she did not want to leave her daughter Rachel whilst she was overseas, but her parents stepped in and offered to look after their granddaughter for her.

=== 1996–1999: All Saints ===
After forming a new group in May 1996, the four singers met with Karl "K-Gee" Gordon, a former band member of Outlaw Posse. The band began looking for a new record deal, but most record labels wanted to model them after the Spice Girls, who had become an international sensation by that time. The group relocated to London Records, where John Benson finalised the recording deal in November 1996. All Saints recorded their debut album, All Saints, with producers including Gordon, Cameron McVey, Magnus Fiennes, John Benson, Neville Henry, Johnny Douglas, and Nellee Hooper.

In mid-1997, the group's debut single "I Know Where It's At" broke them into the mainstream, reaching number four on the UK Singles Chart. Their second single, "Never Ever", was issued in November 1997 and launched them worldwide, peaking at number one in the UK and Australia. The single sold 1.2 million copies in the UK alone (receiving a double platinum certification from the British Phonographic Industry) and won the group two BRIT Awards in 1998: Best British Single and Best British Video. The album All Saints was released in October 1997, reached number two on the UK Album Chart, and was BPI-certified five times platinum in the UK for sales of 1.5 million. The third single from the album was the double A-side "Under the Bridge / Lady Marmalade", which became their second UK number-one single in May 1998, earning a gold certification for 400,000 copies sold. The same month, the album was re-released with a slightly different track listing. "Bootie Call", the fourth single, also went to number one, and the silver-certified "War of Nerves" (the fifth and final release) peaked at number seven, selling 200,000 copies.

The album achieved success in countries such as Australia (double platinum, selling 140,000 copies), Canada (triple platinum, 300,000 copies), and the United States, where All Saints was certified platinum by the RIAA for sales of one million and produced two top forty singles on the Billboard Hot 100: "I Know Where It's At" and "Never Ever". In November 1998, All Saints received the MTV Europe Music Award for Best Breakthrough Artist and performed at the ceremony, although Blatt was absent due to her pregnancy.

=== 2000–2001: Saints and Sinners and break-up ===
In February 2000, All Saints released the single "Pure Shores" as the soundtrack for the film The Beach, written by Shaznay Lewis and William Orbit, with the latter also producing the song. "Pure Shores" became their fourth number-one single in the United Kingdom and the second best-selling single of 2000, with 824,000 copies sold; The song won an Ivor Novello Award for Most Performed Work. Also in 2000, the Appleton sisters and Blatt made their film debut with Honest, which was directed by former Eurythmics member Dave Stewart. Honest is a black comedy set in Swinging London in the late 1960s, in which the singers playing three saucy streetwise sisters who head "up West" to pursue a life of crime. The film received attention for the Appleton sisters topless scenes. Their performances were widely panned; one critic remarked, "It is the worst kind of rubbish, the kind that makes you angry you have wasted 105 minutes of your life watching it".

In October 2000, All Saints released the single "Black Coffee", which became their fifth and final number-one single in the United Kingdom, selling 230,000 copies. This preceded the release of their second studio album, Saints & Sinners, which debuted at number one on the UK Albums Chart, eventually reaching double platinum certification in the United Kingdom for sales of more than 600,000 copies. The third and final single was "All Hooked Up" in January 2001, which peaked at number seven. The following month, All Saints announced that they were to take a break so that they "could clear the air between themselves". Melanie Blatt said later that year that it was uncertain if they would reform, citing their difficulties with the financial and business aspects of the group. Shaznay Lewis later explained that the catalyst for the break-up was a disagreement over who would wear a certain jacket for a photoshoot: "I would never in a million years have put money on the group ending over a jacket incident. But when that incident happened, it fired up so strong, it had to be over. And the way I was then, the state we'd got into then, there was no way she was getting that stupid jacket."

In November 2001, London Records released a greatest hits compilation entitled All Hits. It contains the group's hit singles and Blatt's first solo single, "TwentyFourSeven", a collaboration with Artful Dodger. The album peaked at number eighteen on the UK Albums Chart and was later certified gold, selling 100,000 copies. In 2008, a slightly altered edition of the album was given away for free as part of a promotion with The Mail on Sunday.

=== 2006–2008: First reunion and Studio 1 ===
On 24 January 2006, it was announced that the band had reformed and signed a record deal with Parlophone. They then began work on their third studio album, Studio 1. Its first single, "Rock Steady", released in November 2006, reached number three on the UK Singles Chart. Studio 1 entered the albums chart at number forty, falling significantly short of the success of "Rock Steady" and the group's previous releases; it received a Gold certification by the British Phonographic Industry (BPI). A second single, "Chick Fit", followed in February 2007, but promotional appearances and a physical release were cancelled and it failed to reach the top 200. It was subsequently reported that All Saints and Parlophone had parted ways and the group cancelled their planned UK tour.

In January 2008, Nicole Appleton and Melanie Blatt served as "hijackers" on E4's Big Brother: Celebrity Hijack, during which Blatt said that they had a record deal with an undisclosed company in a conversation with housemate Nathan Fagan-Gayle. The following month, in a press release for the Wideboys' single with Shaznay Lewis, titled "Daddy O", posted on the official website of All Around the World, it was stated that All Saints were recording in the studio and would be back with new material before the end of 2008. In September 2008, All Around the World discredited claims that All Saints had been signed with them with a post at their official website. In 2009, Melanie Blatt told the London Lite in 2009 that "All Saints are never getting back together again". Three months later, a second compilation album called Pure Shores: The Very Best of All Saints, was released. This two-disc collection features the group's hit singles alongside a selection of album tracks and B-sides.

Blatt discussed the reunion's failure in an interview with i-D magazine in 2012: "I don't think it was done for the right reasons... I know that I did it for the money. We got signed before we had even made music again, it wasn't like we felt we had something to give back to the world... we were given an opportunity and took it, without really thinking about it too hard". She also said she never felt comfortable with the success the band had and that "it was not necessarily the plan at the beginning; there was a lot of compromise involved".

=== 2013–2016: Second reunion and Red Flag ===
On 25 May 2013, original All Saints member Simone Rainford died from kidney cancer a month after her 38th birthday in her home in Greenwich.

In November 2013, it was announced that the group was officially reforming for a second time to support the Backstreet Boys for five dates across the UK and Ireland in 2014. The same year, they performed at G-A-Y and V Festival. Blatt said in an interview that the group had no plans to record new material and were "just taking each day as it comes and doing it for pure enjoyment". On 27 January 2016, it was confirmed that All Saints would release their fourth studio album, Red Flag, on 8 April 2016. The lead single from the album, "One Strike", preceded the album on 26 February 2016.

On 22 February 2016, All Saints announced their first headlining show in over a decade at London's KOKO. On 15 March 2016, the group announced their first headlining tour in 15 years in support of their 2016 comeback album, Red Flag. The Red Flag Tour visited 10 British cities throughout October 2016, beginning in Newcastle upon Tyne and ending in Norwich. The group revealed that the tour set list comprised all of their successful singles as well as some tracks from Red Flag.

Red Flag debuted at number 3 on the UK Albums Chart. The group confirmed the second single from the album would be "This Is A War" and third "One Woman Man".

On 22 October 2016, it was announced that All Saints will support Take That on their Wonderland Live tour in May and June 2017.

=== 2017–2022: Testament and indefinite hiatus ===
On 19 March 2017, the group confirmed that recording had begun on their fifth studio album. As with their previous albums, Karl "K-Gee" Gordon was involved in the production, as well as William Orbit, who produced "Pure Shores" and "Black Coffee".

On 29 May 2018, the group announced via their official Instagram account the name of their fifth album, Testament, along with its release date of 11 July 2018. The group's first single from the album, titled "Love Lasts Forever", debuted on BBC Radio 2 on 31 May. The group embarked on a national tour in celebration of the release of the record the same year.

On 14 April 2020, the group released a cover of "Message in a Bottle" with Sting. An "Official Studio Video" was released on 20 April 2020. The band were special guests for three nights on Westlife's The Wild Dreams Tour in 2022. This marked the final time the group appeared together following their indefinite hiatus.

== Solo careers ==
Melanie Blatt was the first member to record after the group disbanded. In September 2001, she collaborated with Artful Dodger on the track "TwentyFourSeven", which peaked at number six in the UK. In February 2002, Blatt replaced Kelis's vocals on the UK release of the track "I'm Leavin'" by Outsidaz and Rah Digga; the single reached number 42. Her third single, "Do Me Wrong", was released in August 2003 through London Records and peaked at number 18. Blatt was dropped by the label due to low sales, and the album she was working on at the time never materialised. In April 2005, Blatt returned to the music industry with a new single, "See Me", which was included on the Robots film soundtrack and peaked at number 78 in the UK. The single was released through Swollen Ankle Ltd, with whom Blatt began working on an album. During mid-2005, she played small venues in the UK and performed material from the album, which was shelved when All Saints reunited in early 2006. In 2013 and 2015, she was a judge and mentor on The X Factor in New Zealand.

Natalie and Nicole Appleton wrote and recorded their own album, formed the duo Appleton and signed a contract with Polydor Records. In September 2002, the Appleton sisters launched their first single, "Fantasy", which reached number two in the UK. Their autobiography, Together, was published the following month. Their second single, "Don't Worry", was released in March 2003 and reached number five in the UK before the release of their first album, Everything's Eventual, the same month. The album peaked at number nine; its final single was "Everything Eventually", which was released in July 2003 and peaked at number 38. Appleton and Polydor subsequently parted ways. In 2025, and the following year, they released "Falling into You", their first single in 23 years.

Shaznay Lewis released her first solo single, "Never Felt Like This Before", in July 2004; it reached number eight in the UK. Her album Open followed two weeks later via London Records and peaked at number 22, although the second single, "You", charted only at number 56. In November 2004, Lewis was one of the artists involved in the Band Aid 20 re-recording of "Do They Know It's Christmas?". In early 2008, Lewis collaborated with Wideboys on the UK top forty hit "Daddy O". On 17 May 2024, Lewis released her second solo album, Pages, 20 years after the release of Open.

== Members ==
=== Past members ===
- Mel Blatt (1993–2001, 2006–2008, 2013–2022)
- Shaznay Lewis (1993–2001, 2006–2008, 2013–2022)
- Simone Rainford (1993–1995) (died 2013)
- Natalie Appleton (1996–2001, 2006–2008, 2013–2022)
- Nicole Appleton (1996–2001, 2006–2008, 2013–2022)

== Discography ==
- All Saints (1997)
- Saints & Sinners (2000)
- Studio 1 (2006)
- Red Flag (2016)
- Testament (2018)

== Tours ==
Headlining

- The U Tour (1998–1999)
- Red Flag Tour (2016)
- Testament Tour (2018)
- Australian Tour (with Craig David) (2019)

As opening act

- In a World Like This Tour – Backstreet Boys (2014)
- Wonderland Live – Take That (2017)
- The Wild Dreams Tour – Westlife (2022)

== Awards and nominations ==
Year	Nominee / work	Award	Result
1998	"Never Ever"	MOBO Awards for Best Video	Won
1998	"Never Ever"	The Record of the Year	Nominated
1998	"Never Ever"	BRIT Award for Best British Single	Won
1998	"Never Ever"	BRIT Award for Best British Video	Won
1998	All Saints	BRIT Award for Best British Breakthrough Act	Nominated
1998	All Saints	Viva Comet Award for Best International Newcomer	Won
1998	"Never Ever"	MTV Europe Music Award for Best Song	Nominated
1998	All Saints	MTV Europe Music Award for Best Album	Nominated
1998	All Saints	MTV Europe Music Award for Best Group	Nominated
1998	All Saints	MTV Europe Music Award for Best New Act	Won
1999	"Under the Bridge" / "Lady Marmalade"	BRIT Award for Best British Video	Nominated
1999	"Never Ever"	APRA Music Award for Most Performed Foreign Work	Nominated
1999	All Saints	BRIT Award for Best British Dance Act	Nominated
1999	All Saints	Edison Award for Best International Newcomer	Won
2000	All Saints	MTV Europe Music Award for Best Pop	Won
2000	"Pure Shores"	The Record of the Year	Nominated
2001	"Pure Shores"	BRIT Award for Best British Single	Nominated
2001	"Pure Shores"	BRIT Award for Best British Video	Nominated
2001	All Saints	BRIT Award for Best British Group	Nominated
2001	"Pure Shores"	Ivor Novello Award for Most Performed Work	Won
2001	"Pure Shores"	APRA Music Award for Most Performed Foreign Work	Nominated
2001	All Saints	NME Award for Best Pop Act	Nominated
2001	All Saints	NRJ Music Award for International Breakthrough	Nominated
2001	All Saints	NRJ Music Award for Music Website of the Year	Nominated
2006	All Saints	Virgin Media Music Award for Best Comeback	Nominated
2007	All Saints	Virgin Media Music Award for Disaster of the Year	Nominated
2018	"Love Lasts Forever"	Popjustice £20 Music Prize for Best British Pop Single	Nominated
2019	"Love Lasts Forever"	Classic Pop Reader Award for Single of the Year	Nominated
2019	Testament	Classic Pop Reader Award for Album of the Year	Nominated
2019	All Saints	Classic Pop Reader Award for Group of the Year	Nominated

== See also ==
- List of best-selling girl groups
