= One Strike =

2016 song performed by All Saints

Single by All Saints

from the album Red Flag
- Released: 23 February 2016
- Genre: R&B; soul; synth-pop
- Length: 3:33
- Label: London
- Songwriters: Shaznay Lewis; Pete Hutchings
- Producer: Hutch

All Saints singles chronology
| "Rock Steady" (2006) | "One Strike" (2016) | "This Is A War" (2016) |

Music video
- "One Strike" on YouTube

"One Strike" is a song recorded by English-Canadian girl group All Saints for their fourth studio album, Red Flag (2016). The track was written by group member Shaznay Lewis and its producer Hutch, inspired by the breakdown of group member Nicole Appleton's highly publicised marriage to Oasis and Beady Eye frontman Liam Gallagher. "One Strike" is a mid-tempo, R&B, soul and synth-pop song that lyrically deals with the protagonist's emotions immediately after breaking up with their significant other.

"One Strike" was released for digital download by London Records on 23 February 2016 as All Saints' comeback single, and the lead single from the Red Flag. Upon release, the song was met with critical acclaim; critics praised the group's dreamlike harmonies and the understated lyrics, likening it to that of their 2000 single "Pure Shores". An accompanying music video was directed by Tom Beard and released on 4 March 2016; the black-and-white and low fidelity music video features the group singing and dancing in moody fashion. All Saints promoted "One Strike" with a live performance on Alan Carr: Chatty Man.

== Writing and inspiration ==
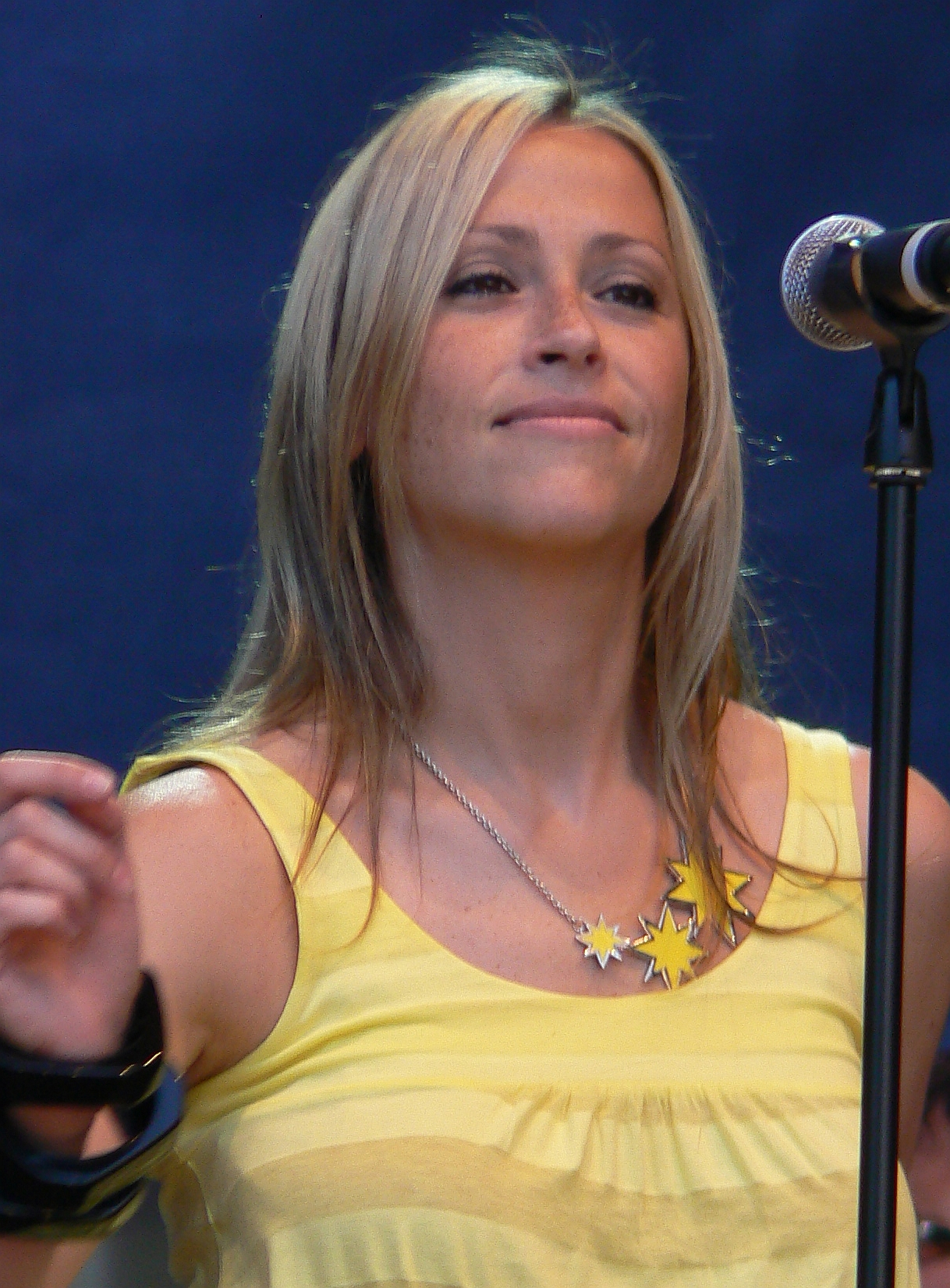
"One Strike" was inspired by the breakdown of group member Nicole Appleton's marriage to Liam Gallagher.

All Saints member Nicole Appleton and Oasis frontman Liam Gallagher were extensively portrayed in the British media as "the golden couple" of the 1990s music scene. Having been dating since 2000, the couple married in 2008, when their son, Gene, was six. However, in 2013, it was revealed to Nicole by the media that Gallagher had an affair and was expecting a child with American journalist Liza Ghorbani. Upon finding out about the affair, Nicole phoned fellow All Saints member Shaznay Lewis; the two spoke for several hours.

Nicole's tribulation was at the forefront of Lewis' mind, being "the heaviest thing going on" at the time. Lewis, herself, was feeling the emotions Nicole was going through and was inspired to write about it as a friend in "One Strike". The track also resonated with the other All Saints members; Natalie Appleton admitted to crying during her first few listens of the song, while Melanie Blatt described it as a "fire analogy". Lewis wrote "One Strike" with Hutch, a new producer who she had taken notice of prior to the development of the song's parent album, Red Flag.

The song stemmed from the breakdown of Nicole's marriage and the phone call Nicole had with Lewis. It was the first track recorded for the album. Only months later did Lewis inform Nicole of the lyrical meaning; "I didn't even know and I was singing along to it, months later, and she went 'You know when you spoke to me and told me…' and I just went 'Oh my god'", Nicole recalled. Further inspiration came from the group's experiences where "things really come along and change just like that". In an interview for i-D magazine, Nicole explained: "It's not about the divorce, it's about the moment I found out what [Gallagher] did to me. It's pretty much that." While Lewis clarified:

The phrase 'one strike' is about how your life can just change in one instant. You can be walking down the road, you've just left your family at home and everything's hunky dory, then when you go back home they're gone. On one side of the door your life's amazing, on the other side it changes just like that.

== Composition and lyrical interpretation ==
"One Strike"
A 19-second sample of the song featuring All Saints singing and harmonising on its refrain, "And with one strike..."

"One Strike" is a R&B, soul and synth-pop song. It is mid-tempo and features production that is more minimal than most of All Saints' previous singles. A melodic and laid-back sound is aided by the group using composed and intimate vocals, complemented with electronic reverberation. The group's harmonies throughout have a smooth and dreamlike quality.

The track opens with a mellow, 1990s-indebted instrumental which comprises a progressive synth line and is later accompanied by rattling percussion instruments. Leading into the first verse, the production becomes less prominent, putting emphasis on the group's vocals and the lyrics which in this segment specifically detail the very moment Nicole found out about Gallagher's affair: "Stone cold / You wake me when the phone vibrates / Your voice sounds dulled, but loud enough to hear you." Guitar accompanies the instrumental in the chorus which begins with the refrain, "And with one strike..."

A break-up song, the lyrics of "One Strike" have been widely interpreted as a "direct response" to Nicole's marriage dissolving, and as a diss track about Gallagher. Alec Soames of Notion magazine viewed it as a "f*ck you track to Liam Gallagher". While Marina Hyde of The Guardian referred to it as a "divorce-court single", and Harriet Gibsone from the same publication called it "a shrug of a shoulders, a nail-polish emoji". Anna Gaca of Spin magazine found the lyrics to be understated yet candid; "I don't want to be in this home / Broken promises, time to leave / I had everything that you need[ed]".

== Release ==
On 27 January 2016, All Saints announced "One Strike" as their comeback single and the lead single from Red Flag. It was premiered on BBC Radio 2's The Chris Evans Breakfast Show on 23 February 2016, and subsequently released three days ahead of schedule as an "instant grat" from digital pre-orders of the album. A four-track remixes EP was released for digital download on 25 March 2016.

== Critical response ==
Upon release, "One Strike" was met with critical acclaim. Owen Myers of The Fader regarded it as "up there with the best" of the group's discography and "exactly the song you need for when days are getting longer". Myers likened the guitar melody to Blood Orange productions and felt the group's harmonies "still sound so good". Lewis Corner and Amy Davidson from Digital Spy said the track is "as emotionally personal as it is a slice of absolute pop perfection". Stefan Kyriazis of the Daily Express hailed the song as "a powerful return to form", deeming it "timeless" and "classic All Saints". Similarly, Sarah Deen of Metro wrote: "It's classic All Saints – chilled out and melodic, but with feisty, meaningful lyrics and lovely harmonies. These ladies have still got it – not that they ever lost it." Popjustice said the track "sounds completely like All Saints without seeming dated", concluding: "Perhaps they were always more ahead of their time than we realised." Gibsone wrote that the song lived up to the group's legacy and likened it to their 2000 collaborations with producer William Orbit, explaining: "Next to Lana and Rihanna, it suits the current casual climate of pop in 2016. Their veil of mystery, their aloof cool remains." Gibsone highlighted a lack of melodrama in the lyrics and considered "One Strike" to be "as elegant as a song about [divorce] can sound". Soames considered the "catchy" chorus and "energetic" refrain highlights. Caitlin McBride of the Irish Independent commented that the track was "actually pretty good".

Several critics likened the song to the group's 2000 single "Pure Shores". Robbie Daw from Idolator viewed "One Strike" as "easily one of 2016's best pop songs so far" and noted that All Saints were "in fine form". Daw opined that the track shared the "musical magic" and "enthralling" qualities of "Pure Shores". Mark Savage, music reporter for BBC News, echoed Daw's view saying the song featured "sun-kissed harmonies that instantly recall the band's 'Pure Shores' heyday". Virgin Media said the track "ebbs and flows like [...] 'Pure Shores', with harmonies on point once more". Noisey called the song "glorious" and a "triumphant comeback single", and claimed that the group's harmonies and dreamlike sound were what pop music had missed. The website went on to describe the track as "what Coldplay couldn't pull off at all with A Head Full of Dreams", "the chill out session to Little Mix's stomping workout" and "quite possibly, 2016's answer to 'Pure Shores'". Eleanor Margolis of the New Statesman commented, "You can pretty much smell the CK1 wafting off 'One Strike'", and described the song as "sort of like someone shook 'Pure Shores' out of the coma it went into when it did a dodgy E at Glasto". Conversely, Fact magazine found the track "pretty good [...], not 'Pure Shores' good, but definitely alright".

== Music video ==
The accompanying music video for "One Strike" was directed by Tom Beard, and shot in monochrome and low fidelity. It was released on 4 March 2016. The visual strays from artifice and manipulation, instead focusing on the characters of All Saints. It is entirely in black-and-white and features glitches throughout, and the group singing and dancing in front of a white backdrop. Near the end, a burning candle is shown. The video ends with one group member dropping a parka on the floor – a reference to Gallagher who is known for wearing parkas.

Katy Forrester of the Daily Mirror said the video "takes us back to the days of 'Black Coffee'" and described it as "cool" and "artsy", adding: "It's a moody video and really matches the feel of the song." Similarly, Justin Myers from the Official Charts Company opined, "The moody, atmospheric clip matches the vibe of the song", and concluded that it proved All Saints "still know where it's at". Lauren Murphy from Entertainment.ie deemed the clip "mean 'n' moody". The Irish Examiner wrote that the video had a "definite 90s vibe", while Jennifer Ruby of the London Evening Standard regarded it as "sticking with their trademark 90s style". Rishma Dosani of OK! found it "pretty emotional".

== Live performances ==
All Saints first performed "One Strike" during an acoustic set for The Chris Evans Breakfast Show on 26 February 2016. They performed the track on Alan Carr: Chatty Man on 17 March 2016. "One Strike" was included as the encore on the setlist for their first headlining show in over a decade at London's KOKO, on 4 April 2016. The group also sang the song along with past single "Pure Shores" at Starnacht am Neusiedler See on 30 April 2016 in Austria. All Saints also performed the song with "Pure Shores" on the Energy Fashion Night event, which took place on 7 May 2016. "One Strike" was performed as part of the setlist of their 2016 Red Flag Tour, and as an opening act for Take That's 2017 tour, Wonderland Live.

== Track listings ==
- Digital download
1. "One Strike" – 3:33
- Digital download (Remixes)
1. "One Strike" (K-Gee Big Tings Refix) – 4:14
2. "One Strike" (Sunhatch Remix) – 4:35
3. "One Strike" (Ogre Remix) – 3:13
4. "One Strike" (Beatnik Remix) – 3:31

== Charts ==
| Chart (2016) | Peak position |
|---|---|
| Scottish Singles Sales (Official Charts) | 50 |
| UK Singles (Official Charts Company) | 115 |
| UK Singles Downloads (Official Charts) | 45 |
| UK Singles Sales (Official Charts Company) | 45 |
