= Pure Shores =

2000 single by All Saints

Single by All Saints

from the album The Beach: Motion Picture Soundtrack and Saints & Sinners
- B-side: "If You Don't Know What I Know"
- Released: 14 February 2000
- Studio: Guerilla Beach, Conway (Los Angeles); Whitfield Street, AIR (London, England)
- Genre: Pop
- Length: 4:27
- Label: London
- Songwriters: William Orbit; Shaznay Lewis
- Producer: William Orbit

All Saints singles chronology
"War of Nerves" (1998)	"Pure Shores" (2000)	"Black Coffee" (2000)

Music video
- "Pure Shores" on YouTube

"Pure Shores" is a song by English girl group All Saints from their second studio album, Saints & Sinners (2000). Group member Shaznay Lewis and producer William Orbit wrote the song for a scene in the 2000 adventure drama film The Beach. The song has been described by critics as combining the R&B sound of All Saints' previous releases with ambient and electronic production, with syncopated synth delays, arpeggiated guitar and ethereal effects. It was released by London Records on 14 February 2000 as the lead single from the film's soundtrack and Saints & Sinners.

Music critics complimented the combination of Orbit's elaborate production with the group's harmonies. "Pure Shores" debuted at number one on the UK Singles Chart with first-week sales of 199,084 copies, becoming the group's fourth chart topper. Internationally, the song reached number one in Belgium (Wallonia), Ireland, Italy and Romania, and charted in the top 10 in Australia, New Zealand and across Europe. It was the second best-selling single of 2000 in the UK and was certified double platinum by the British Phonographic Industry (BPI) for sales of 1.2 million units.

The music video for "Pure Shores" was directed by Vaughan Arnell; it shows All Saints moving in blurry night vision and infrared shots on the coast of Norfolk. The song won Most Performed Work at the Ivor Novello Awards in 2001. At the 2001 Brit Awards, "Pure Shores" was nominated for Song of the Year and Video of the Year, losing in both categories to "Rock DJ" by Robbie Williams.

== Production and writing ==
"Pure Shores" was written by All Saints group member Shaznay Lewis and producer William Orbit. Pete Tong, All Saints' A&R at the time, wanted the group to be a part of the soundtrack he was producing for Danny Boyle's film The Beach. Boyle, however, disliked the idea of having a pop group associated with his film. Tong then contacted Orbit and convinced Boyle to include All Saints on the basis that Orbit would produce the song. Orbit spent over two months tirelessly producing the song, to the extent that he felt like he had "totally lost sight of its potential". Orbit and engineer Jake Davies used a Solid State Logic (SSL) 9000 J-series mixing console, Boxer 5 studio monitor, Sony 3348 digital multitrack recorder and the digital audio workstation Pro Tools. English mixing engineer Spike Stent mixed the song in his room at Olympic Studios in London using a SSL 4064 G-series console, Genelec monitor and Studer tape recorder.

Lewis wrote "Pure Shores" based on Orbit's backing track, and a 40-second clip from the scene where co-stars Leonardo DiCaprio and Virginie Ledoyen swim underwater. She had previously read half of the 1996 novel on which the film was based. Regarding the writing process, Lewis said: "It was a case of 'watch this, be inspired, go off and give it a go'. They didn't really point me in any direction of how they wanted it to be lyrically. Being given a brief like that, they'd already painted the picture for me." Lewis originally wrote the lyrics during a flight to Los Angeles where she was going to work with Orbit on the song. However, after arriving at her hotel, she discovered that she lost the lyrics and had to rewrite them. As a result, some of lyrics changed in the rewritten version. Lewis came up with the title "Pure Shores" after writing the song. "I've never even thought that it isn't mentioned once in the actual song," she said.

== Composition ==
"Pure Shores" marks a departure from the R&B style of All Saints' previous music, combining it with electronic and ambient production. Tom Ewing from the e-zine Freaky Trigger described it as "a pop take on ambient music" with "chillout bubbles and ripples". The sheet music for the song shows a time signature of 4/4 and a key of D major, with a tempo of 102 beats per minute and a chord progression of D–Em–C–G, with a sequence of A–A_{9}sus_{4}–A_{9} in the bridge. Although written by Lewis, the lead vocals on the first two verses of the track are by group member Melanie Blatt; Lewis sings the bridge and the third and final verse, and sisters Natalie and Nicole Appleton sing backing vocals and chorus harmonies. The song is built around a syncopation of synth delays, arpeggiated and reverberated guitar, and electronic percussion. Ethereal sound effects are filtered and distorted throughout, with some resembling whale vocalisations. The track has a relaxed pace with surges in the chorus and bridge. Richard Folland of PopMatters writes that "Pure Shores" is "buoyed by a lyric promising a bright future."

== Critical reception ==
"Pure Shores" was well received by music critics upon release. In his review for The Times, Ed Potten characterised the song as the "musical equivalent of a pina colada: faintly exotic, syrupy sweet and ultimately quite intoxicating." The Daily Telegraph gave the song five out of five stars, writing, "You can almost feel your toes dipping into the tropical sea and hot sand running through your fingers. The result is totally addictive." Uncut magazine's Chris Roberts found the production beautiful and said it "will sound as floatily motivating in a decade's time". John Walshe of Hot Press wrote that it "marries William Orbit's swirling galaxies of sound with their harmony-driven pop to perfect effect", while Caroline Sullivan of The Guardian argued that All Saints "lend radiance to [Orbit's] twinkling fairy lights".

Q magazine's Dan Gennoe named it the "crowning glory" of The Beach soundtrack which "confirmed All Saints' position as pop's coolest girl band." In The Sydney Morning Herald, Stephanie Peatling believed the "lush" track "puts the streetwise cousins of the Spice Girls back on the block." Fiona Shepherd of The Scotsman described it as "classy". Writing for Mixmag, Dorian Lynskey felt the song provided "a twist" to All Saints, calling it "a heady, sensual melancholy better suited to headphones than the Met Bar." In a less enthusiastic review, Dotmusic's James Poletti gave "Pure Shores" a rating of three out five, commenting, "Despite Orbit's slightly lightweight electronics, the song isn't half bad".

NME ranked the song 18th in its Single of the Year list for 2000. Playlouder listed it as the best song of 2000, writing that the "bewitching" track found the group "ditching the famous-for-being-famous tag, and finally becoming the statuesque pop goddesses they always claimed to be." "Pure Shores" was also included in The Daily Telegraph's list of "100 pop songs that defined the Noughties", The Observer's list of the best singles of the 2000s decade, and Time Out London's list of the 50 best pop songs.

== Commercial performance ==
"Pure Shores" debuted at number one on the UK Singles Chart, becoming All Saints' fourth chart-topper. The single sold 199,084 copies in its first week, outselling its closest competitor by three to one. The song topped the chart for a second week with sales of 155,000 copies, before being replaced by another Orbit production, Madonna's "American Pie". "Pure Shores" spent 20 weeks on the chart. It was the second best-selling single of 2000, behind Bob the Builder's "Can We Fix It?", and ranked 27th in the decade-end chart. The song was certified double platinum by the British Phonographic Industry (BPI) for track-equivalent sales of 1.2 million. It is All Saints' second best-selling single in the UK, behind "Never Ever" (1997).

The song boosted All Saints' profile internationally, becoming their most successful single since "Never Ever" in many key territories. In Europe, "Pure Shores" became the group's first chart-topper in Belgium (Wallonia), Ireland, Italy and Romania, and reached number three on the Eurochart Hot 100. In France, it peaked at number six, becoming the band's second top-10 single, and was certified gold by the Syndicat National de l'Édition Phonographique (SNEP) in 2000 for sales of 250,000 copies. It also charted in the top 10 in Belgium (Flanders), the Czech Republic, Finland, Hungary, Iceland, the Netherlands, Norway, Sweden and Switzerland.

In Australia, "Pure Shores" peaked at number four on the ARIA Charts, making it All Saints' third top-five single in the country. It was certified platinum by the Australian Recording Industry Association (ARIA) in 2000. On the Official New Zealand Music Chart, the song reached number two. It marked All Saints' fourth top-10 record in New Zealand and was certified platinum by Recorded Music NZ (RMNZ). In Canada, the song peaked at number 35 on the RPM 100 Hit Tracks chart.

== Music video ==
=== Background and synopsis ===
All Saints in a scene from the music video which made use of night vision and infrared effects.

The music video for "Pure Shores" was directed by Vaughan Arnell, and filmed on the coast of the Holkham National Nature Reserve and Wells-next-the-Sea in Norfolk over three days in January 2000. According to Natalie and Nicole Appleton, Blatt and Lewis were prioritized for screentime and they had to ask Arnell for more visibility during filming. Nicole Appleton wrote in the Appleton autobiography Together that this made Lewis cry and attempt to quit the video shoot. A police investigation was launched after a freelance photographer, Rob Howarth, claimed he was assaulted at the filming location by a security guard hired by All Saints.

The video premiered on Dotmusic's website on 25 January 2000. It opens with All Saints in numerous ghost-like frames, moving in blurry night vision and infrared shots on a beach. The group are then shown in an aerial view, strolling and running on sand dunes. Short scenes of DiCaprio in The Beach are intercut throughout. He is shown spinning, in a cavern, and in a confrontational scene with co-actress Tilda Swinton. All Saints are also seen singing in a concrete tunnel, and at a Norfolk beach hut resembling those of Ko Phi Phi Le from the film.

=== Reception ===
The music video received heavy rotation from MTV Australia, MTV Europe, MTV UK and British television channel The Box. Neil McCormick of The Daily Telegraph wrote that it was unclear whether All Saints were promoting The Beach or vice versa, citing it as an example of a symbiotic relationship between the music and film industries. CBC Television placed "Pure Shores" second in its ranking of All Saints music videos, appreciating how Arnell reflected scenes from the film with the group. The Guardian included the video in its list of best subversive beach scenes, writing that the setting "feels taunting, a constant reminder of what happens when plans are ruined." BBC America's Kevin Wicks, on the other hand, dismissed it as "the most unflattering girl group video ever", criticising the use of night vision which made All Saints look like "hopelessly dazed raccoons".

== Live performances ==
To promote "Pure Shores", All Saints performed the song on television shows such as Top of the Pops, CD:UK, Sen kväll med Luuk, Wetten, dass..?, and Later with Jools Holland. The song was also included on their sets for Witnness, V2000 and Creamfields festivals in August 2000. The group then performed "Pure Shores" at the 2000 MTV Europe Music Awards, which were held on 16 November 2000 at the Ericsson Globe in Stockholm, Sweden. NME magazine complimented their "flare-clad, pristine performance". A day later, they performed on BBC's Children in Need marathon. All Saints performed the song at the 2001 World Sports Awards, held at London's Royal Albert Hall on 16 January 2001. For the performance, Natalie Appleton wore a T-shirt emblazoned with the legend 'I Love Liam' as a reference to her boyfriend, The Prodigy's Liam Howlett. At the time, the group was at the verge of splitting up, with the media noting the "irreconcilable rift had indeed developed between the four" on stage.

Upon the group's first return in 2006, it was performed on their show at the Shepherd's Bush Pavilion in London. The group wore black or white-coloured shirts teamed with big, loose-knotted ties. Eva Simpson and Caroline Hedley of the Daily Mirror said that the group "put on one hell of a show". "Pure Shores" was then performed live on Popworld on 4 November 2006 as part of promotion leading up to their new album Studio 1's release two days later. Additionally, the song was performed by All Saints on The Chart Show on 18 November 2006, and on Channel 4's T4, aired on the same day. In January 2014, Natalie Appleton performed the song with English singer Melanie C on her Sporty's Forty concert, which celebrated her 40th birthday.

Upon their second return eight years later, All Saints performed "Pure Shores" as the encore on their opening act for Backstreet Boys' In a World Like This Tour in 2014. They also sang the song in a concert at G-A-Y, and the 2014 V Festival. After the announcement of their fourth studio album Red Flag, the group performed it on the 2016 Elle Style Awards, and as the encore on their show at London's KOKO. The group also sang the song at Starnacht am Neusiedler See in Austria, that Energy Fashion Night event, as well as on Michael McIntyre's Big Show. and V Festival 2016. "Pure Shores" was included on the setlist of their 2016 Red Flag Tour. All Saints supported Take That on their Wonderland Live tour in 2017, and performed "Pure Shores" on their set as opening acts. To promote their fifth studio album Testament, they performed again the song on Radio 2 Live in Hyde Park, Children in Need Rocks 2018, and Strictly Come Dancing: It Takes Two. "Pure Shores" was also included on the setlist of the Testament Tour later that year.

The group performed "Pure Shores" at the 2021 edition of the Isle of Wight festival, dedicating the song to Girls Aloud member Sarah Harding who had passed away earlier that month.

== Formats and track listings ==
- CD1 and cassette single
1. "Pure Shores" – 4:27
2. "If You Don't Know What I Know" – 4:36
3. "Pure Shores" (The Beach Life Mix) – 4:31
- CD2 single
1. "Pure Shores" – 4:27
2. "Pure Shores" (2 Da Beach U Don't Stop Remix) – 5:01
3. "Pure Shores" (Cosmos Remix) – 10:03
- CD maxi-single
1. "Pure Shores" – 4:27
2. "If You Don't Know What I Know" – 4:36
3. "Pure Shores" (The Beach Life Mix) – 4:31
4. "Pure Shores" (2 Da Beach U Don't Stop Remix) – 5:01

== Personnel ==
- William Orbit – producer, vocal arrangement, keyboards, guitars
- Mark "Spike" Stent – mixing
- Jake Davies – mix engineer
- Mark Endert – engineer
- Sean Spuehler – engineer, Pro Tools programming
- Andrew Nichols – assistant engineer
- Ben Georgiades – assistant engineer
- John Nelson – assistant engineer
- Shaznay Lewis – vocals, vocal arrangement
- Melanie Blatt – vocals
- Nicole Appleton – vocals
- Natalie Appleton – vocals
- Steve Sidelnyk – drums

== Charts ==
=== Weekly charts ===
Weekly chart performance for "Pure Shores"
Chart (2000)	Peak position
Australia (ARIA)	4
Austria (Ö3 Austria Top 40)	11
Belgium (Ultratop 50 Flanders)	5
Belgium (Ultratop 50 Wallonia)	1
Canada Top Singles (RPM)	35
Czech Republic (IFPI)	5
Estonia (Sõnumileht)	2
Europe (Eurochart Hot 100)	3
Finland (Suomen virallinen lista)	5
France (SNEP)	6
France Airplay (M&M)	6
Germany (GfK)	14
Hungary (MAHASZ)	2
Iceland (Íslenski Listinn Topp 40)	6
Ireland (IRMA)	1
Italy (FIMI)	1
Italy Airplay (Music & Media)	3
Netherlands (Dutch Top 40)	9
Netherlands (Single Top 100)	10
New Zealand (Recorded Music NZ)	2
Norway (VG-lista)	5
Romania (Romanian Top 100)	1
Scottish Singles Sales (Official Charts)	1
Spain (Promusicae)	12
Sweden (Sverigetopplistan)	10
Switzerland (Schweizer Hitparade)	6
UK Singles (Official Charts)	1
UK Airplay (Music Week)	1

=== Year-end charts ===
Year-end chart performance for "Pure Shores"
Chart (2000)	Position
Australia (ARIA)	43
Belgium (Ultratop 50 Flanders)	31
Belgium (Ultratop 50 Wallonia)	47
Europe (Eurochart Hot 100)	22
France (SNEP)	43
Iceland (Íslenski Listinn Topp 40)	59
Ireland (IRMA)	15
Netherlands (Dutch Top 40)	83
New Zealand (RIANZ)	18
Romania (Romanian Top 100)	23
Sweden (Hitlistan)	62
Switzerland (Schweizer Hitparade)	34
UK Singles (OCC)	2
UK Airplay (Music Week)	1

=== Decade-end chart ===
Decade-end chart performance for "Pure Shores"
Chart (2000–2009)	Position
UK Singles (OCC)	27

== Certifications ==
Certifications for "Pure Shores"
Region	Certification	Certified units/sales
Australia (ARIA)	Platinum	70,000^{^}
Belgium (BRMA)	Gold	25,000^{*}
France (SNEP)	Gold	250,000^{*}
Italy (FIMI)	Gold	25,000^{*}
New Zealand (RMNZ)	Platinum	30,000^{‡}
Sweden (GLF)	Gold	15,000^{^}
United Kingdom (BPI)	2× Platinum	1,200,000^{‡}
^{*} Sales figures based on certification alone.^{^} Shipments figures based on certification alone.^{‡} Sales+streaming figures based on certification alone.

== Release history ==
Release dates and formats for "Pure Shores"
Region	Date	Format(s)	Label	Ref.
United Kingdom	14 February 2000	CD; cassette	London	
Germany	14 February 2000	CD	London	
Canada	15 February 2000	CD	London	
France	15 February 2000	CD	London	
Japan	23 March 2000	CD	London	

== Remixes ==
The song was remixed by Fatboy Slim, who played it as the final track of his Big Beach Boutique II set in 2002.
