= Chick Fit =

Promotional single by All Saints

from the album Studio 1
- B-side: "You Don't Know Me"; "I Need a Remedy"
- Released: 26 February 2007
- Recorded: 2006
- Studio: Mayfair, London
- Length: 3:31
- Label: Parlophone
- Songwriters: Shaznay Lewis, Rick Nowels
- Producer: Rick Nowels

"Chick Fit" is a song performed by English-Canadian girl group All Saints from their third studio album Studio 1. It was released as a digital-only promotional single from the album on 26 February 2007. The song was originally planned to be the second official single with a two-part CD single but that was cancelled due to the poor sales of Studio 1 and a fall-out between All Saints and their label Parlophone Records. "Chick Fit" was co-written by group member Shaznay Lewis in collaboration with the song's producer Rick Nowels. The song is lyrically influenced by feelings of feminism and infatuation.

The song was accompanied by a music video which was directed by Daniel Wolfe and released on 18 January 2007. The video features the American street dance, Krumping. All Saints performed the song on a T4 Special and Popworld.

== Background ==
On 15 January 2007, All Saints announced on their official website that "Chick Fit" was going to be released as the second single from Studio 1 on 26 February 2007. Following the poor sales of Studio 1 All Saints were en route to being dropped by their label Parlophone Records before "Chick Fit" was released. The single release was later cancelled and at the same time not supported by radio stations. Parlophone then decided to release "Chick Fit" as a promotional, download-only single to cut costs following the poor performances of All Saints' Studio 1 and fellow labelmate Robbie Williams' Rudebox.

== Music video ==
"Chick Fit" was accompanied by a music video which was directed by Daniel Wolfe. The video features scenes of an American street dance called Krumping. Contactmusic.com said the video "sees the girls doing what they do best – singing infectious harmonies, looking cool and having fun!" In 2011, Rebecca Schiller from NME included the video at number 38 on their list of 50 Worst Music Videos Ever, stating that "as with most pop acts, All Saints signed out with a whimper rather than a bang, as the final drops of anything that might have been special dribbled out of them. [...] [the video] saw the girls in their JJB finest getting vaguely friendly with some rent-a-crunkers and demolish a cheap drum kit somewhere in the CD:UK studio. They had a good innings, and this was them way, way past their prime".
