= Melanie Blatt =

English singer (born 1975)

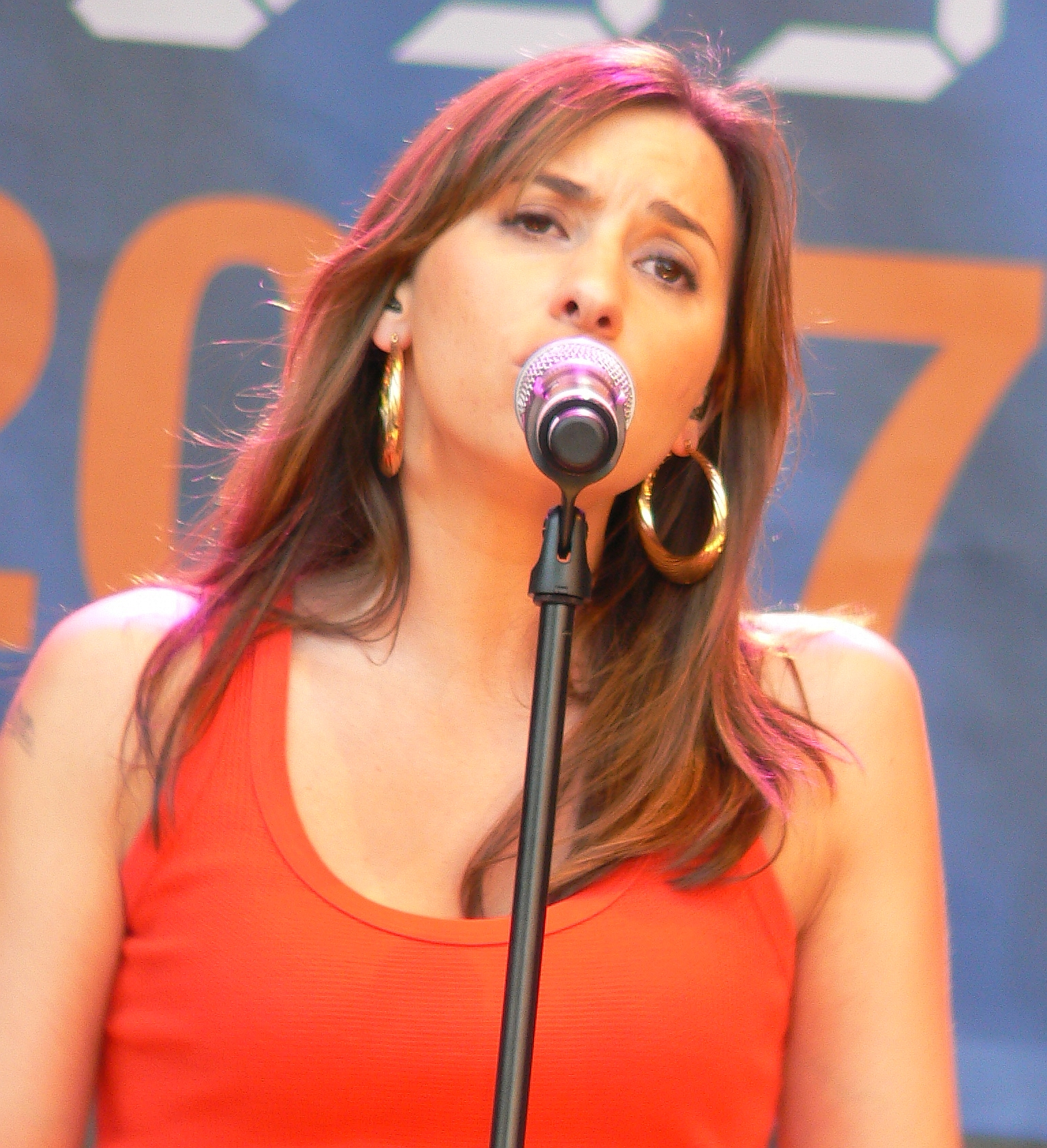
- Blatt in 2007
- Born: Melanie Ruth Blatt; 25 March 1975 (age 51); Camden, London, England
- Occupations: Singer; television presenter; actress
- Years active: 1993–present
- Partner: Stuart Zender
- Children: 1
- Musical career
- Genres: Pop; R&B
- Instrument: Vocals
- Label: London
- Formerly of: All Saints; Drive

Melanie Ruth Blatt (born 25 March 1975) is an English singer. She rose to fame in 1997 as a member of the girl group All Saints. The group have gained five UK number-one singles, two multi-platinum albums and two BRIT Awards, and have sold over 10 million records worldwide.

As a solo artist, Blatt released only two singles, "Do Me Wrong" (2003) and "See Me" (2005), and recorded an unreleased album on London Records. In 2013 and 2015, she was a judge on the television series The X Factor NZ.

== Early life ==
Blatt was born at University College Hospital in the London Borough of Camden and is named after American folk singer Melanie Safka. She was born to a French mother, Hélène and a British Jewish father, David Blatt (author of the book Manchester United Ruined My Wife), whose ancestors were from Poland and Russia, and a younger sister named Jasmine. She was brought up in both the UK and France. In 1986, Blatt was diagnosed as having scoliosis. Since her parents were not satisfied with the treatment for the condition in the United Kingdom they decided to move to France, where a specialist inserted three metal rods in her back.

Blatt went to Fitzjohn's Primary School, where her musical talent was immediately noticed by the music teacher David Joyner, who encouraged her parents to send her to a stage school. In 1986, she attended the Sylvia Young Theatre School, where she met Nicole Appleton. The two girls became best friends. During this period, Blatt also played young Éponine in Les Misérables for six months, and was the understudy for Cosette together with fellow Sylvia Young student Denise van Outen.

== Career ==
=== 1993–2001: Career with All Saints ===
In 1993, Blatt sang under the name Melanie Guillaume in the band Drive with Julienne Davis. They released one single, "Curfew", together. She also did backing vocals for Dreadzone with Denise van Outen. Later that year, Blatt met Shaznay Lewis at the Metamorphosis recording studio in All Saints Road, London. Together, with Simone Rainford, they formed the group All Saints 1.9.7.5, which was later renamed to All Saints when Rainford left and Nicole and Natalie Appleton joined Blatt and Lewis.

In 1997 All Saints released their debut single, "I Know Where It's At", which peaked at number four in the UK. The same year the group released a second single, "Never Ever", which introduced the group to international success after topping the charts in the UK and Australia, and reaching the top ten across Europe, Canada and the United States. The single sold over 1.2 million copies in the United Kingdom and was certified double platinum by the British Phonographic Industry. The same year the group released their debut album, All Saints; it reached number two in the United Kingdom and was certified platinum five times for sales of 1.5 million. The group gained a further two number one singles the following year: "Under the Bridge / Lady Marmalade" and "Bootie Call". In 2000 the group released new single "Pure Shores", which was used in the film The Beach and reached number one in the UK. The single was certified platinum for sales over 600,000 copies. The single was followed by their fifth number one single, "Black Coffee"; their second album, Saints & Sinners, was released shortly after and topped the chart in the United Kingdom. The album was eventually certified double platinum by the BPI for sales over 600,000. In early 2001, following the release of their single "All Hooked Up", the group split and reasons for this were later explained by Shaznay Lewis, who revealed details of tensions between the group.

In 2000, Blatt appeared in the film Honest directed by Dave Stewart, opposite Nicole and Natalie Appleton, and in 2001, she played a small role in the independent British film Dog Eat Dog.

=== 2002–2006: Solo musical releases ===
Blatt's solo releases were of variable success; her most prominent being "TwentyFourSeven", a collaboration with the Artful Dodger, which peaked at No. 6 in September 2001. Melanie began recording on her debut solo album in 2002, working with numerous producers including Sony Music production team Xenomania. In late 2003 she released her debut single, "Do Me Wrong"; it reached number 18 in the UK and led to Blatt being dropped by her label due to its low charting. The album she was working on was scrapped, therefore the release of her upcoming single, "Blue", was cancelled, but later included on British singer Amelia Lily's debut album, Be a Fighter, on which she worked with Xenomania. In 2005 Blatt made a return to music with new single "See Me", which was used in the Robots movie. She began working on a new album with independent label Sowlen Ankle Ltd written with, and recorded by, Matt Hales from Aqualung. During 2005, Blatt played small venues in the UK, with her setlists featuring songs from the album she was working on at the time and also unreleased songs such as "In Your Arms", "I Don't Mind", "Now You're Gone", "No Lullaby" and "Love Sweet Love". Blatt's solo record was shelved in favour of the All Saints reunion.

=== 2006–present: All Saints reunion and television ===
On 24 January 2006, it was announced that the band had reformed and signed a record deal with Parlophone. They subsequently began work on their third studio album, Studio 1. The first single, "Rock Steady" (released in November 2006), reached number three on the UK Singles Chart. Studio 1 entered the albums chart at number forty and sold 60,000 copies according to the BPI, being certified silver. A second single, "Chick Fit", failed to reach the top 200. Blatt discussed the reunion's failure in an interview with i-D magazine in 2012: "I don't think it was done for the right reasons... I know that I did it for the money. We got signed before we had even made music again, it wasn't like we felt we had something to give back to the world... we were given an opportunity and took it, without really thinking about it too hard". She also said she never felt comfortable with the success the band had and that "it was not necessarily the plan at the beginning; there was a lot of compromise involved".

From 2007–2010 Blatt worked as a presenter on the TV show The Hot Desk on ITV2 with co-hosts Nicole Appleton, Dave Berry, Emma Willis and Jayne Sharp. Between 2009 and 2010 she was as a reporter on Angela Griffin's show Angela and Friends. In January 2013 it was announced Melanie Blatt would join Daniel Bedingfield, Stan Walker and Ruby Frost as a judge/mentor on the New Zealand version of The X Factor: "I can't wait to see what kind of artists and voices we are going to find in New Zealand." Blatt mentored the Groups category. It was reported that she and her daughter Lilyella would live in the country for the duration of the series. In February 2013, Blatt revealed she is "making music" and when asked about a solo comeback she said she was going to do something she never thought in a million years she would do. On 11 September 2014 MediaWorks announced both Blatt and Stan Walker would return to judge the second season of the X Factor NZ alongside returning host Dominic Bowden. Blatt and Walker would be joined by new husband-wife duo Willy Moon and Natalia Kills until their sacking, and replaced by Natalie Bassingthwaite and Shelton Woolwright. Blatt mentored the Over 25s and placed 5th with her contestant Steve Broad.

In 2014, All Saints reformed to support the Backstreet Boys for five dates across the UK and Ireland in 2014. On 27 January 2016, it was confirmed that All Saints will release their fourth studio album, Red Flag, on 8 April 2016. The lead single from the album, "One Strike", preceded the album on 26 February 2016.

== Personal life ==
In 1998 to 2006, Blatt was in a relationship with the former Jamiroquai bassist Stuart Zender. They had one child together, Lilyella, born on 20 November 1998.

== Filmography ==
=== Television ===
Year	Title	Role	Notes
2003	Bo' Selecta!	Various roles	Episode: "Melanie Blatt and Craig David"
2007–2010	The Hot Desk	Presenter	
2013–2015	The X Factor New Zealand	Judge	
2022	Celebrity Masterchef	Contestant	Finalist
2023	Celebrity Race Across the World	Contestant	
2024	Taskmaster	Contestant	"New Year Treat 2025" special
2025	Girlbands Forever	Contributor	BBC documentary series

=== Films ===
Year	Title	Role
2000	Honest	Jo Chase
2001	Dog Eat Dog	Jany

== Discography ==
=== Singles ===
==== As main artist ====
List of singles, with selected chart positions
Title	Year	Peak chart positions			Album
Title	Year	UK	IRL	SCO	Album
"Do Me Wrong"	2003	18	36	25	non-album single
"See Me"	2005	78	—	72	non-album single
"—" denotes releases that did not chart or were not released in that territory.

==== As featured artist ====
List of singles, with selected chart positions
Title	Year	Peak chart positions					Album
Title	Year	UK	BEL	EUR	IRL	SCO	Album
"TwentyFourSeven" (Artful Dodger featuring Melanie Blatt)	2001	6	16	32	41	16	All Hits
"I'm Leavin'" (Outsidaz featuring Melanie Blatt & Rah Digga)	2002	41	—	—	—	57	The Bricks
"Let's Get Nice" (K-Gee featuring Melanie Blatt)	2002	—	—	—	—	—	Bounce to This
"Dreaming About Tomorrow" (Rupeski featuring Melanie Blatt)	2002	—	—	—	—	—	non-album single
"Ecstasy / Need Your Lovin'" (Soul Clap featuring Melanie Blatt)	2012	—	—	—	—	—	Efunk
"Fall's Away" (Fur Coat featuring Melanie Blatt)	2013	—	—	—	—	—	Mind Over Matter
"—" denotes releases that did not chart or were not released in that territory.
