= All Hits =

2001 compilation album by All Saints

Greatest hits album by All Saints
- Released: 5 November 2001
- Recorded: Guerilla Beach, Sarm West, Pierce Rooms et al.
- Length: 65:58
- Label: London
- Producer: K-Gee; William Orbit

All Saints chronology
Saints & Sinners (2000)	All Hits (2001)	Studio 1 (2006)

Professional ratings
Review scores
Source	Rating
AllMusic	4.5/5 stars

All Hits is the first greatest hits album by All Saints released in 2001 following the group's split. It also features a song by Melanie Blatt and Artful Dodger called "TwentyFourSeven".

== Track listing ==
#	Title	Album	Length
1.	"Pure Shores"	Saints & Sinners	4:28
2.	"Never Ever"	All Saints	6:27
3.	"Under the Bridge"	All Saints	5:00
4.	"Lady Marmalade" (98 remix)	All Saints	4:09
5.	"I Know Where It's At" (original mix)	All Saints	4:54
6.	"TwentyFourSeven" (radio version); Artful Dodger featuring Melanie Blatt	Single only	3:48
7.	"Black Coffee"	Saints & Sinners	4:49
8.	"Bootie Call" (single version)	All Saints	3:35
9.	"All Hooked Up" (single version)	Saints & Sinners	3:49
10.	"War of Nerves" (98 remix)	All Saints	4:49
11.	"Pure Shores" (2 da Beach U Don't Stop remix)	"Pure Shores" single	20:06
11.	"I Feel You"/"Dreams" (hidden bonus tracks)	Saints & Sinners	20:06
12.	"Never Ever" (Booker T vocal mix) (Japanese bonus track)	The Remix Album	5:44

== Charts ==
Chart (2001)	Peak position
Danish Albums (Hitlisten)	32
German Albums (Offizielle Top 100)	71
Irish Albums (IRMA)	38
New Zealand Albums (RMNZ)	24
Scottish Albums (OCC)	20
Swiss Albums (Schweizer Hitparade)	51
UK Albums (OCC)	18

== Certifications ==
Region	Certification	Certified units/sales
United Kingdom (BPI)	Gold	100,000^{^}
^{^} Shipments figures based on certification alone.
