= The Remix Album (All Saints album) =

1998 remix album by All Saints

Remix album by All Saints
- Released: 29 December 1998
- Recorded: House of Pimps
- Genres: UK garage; house; R&B
- Length: 70:16
- Label: London
- Producer: K-Gee et al.

All Saints chronology
All Saints (1997)	The Remix Album (1998)	Saints & Sinners (2000)

The Remix Album is an album by the English-Canadian girl group All Saints. It was released in 1998, following the success of their eponymous debut album and features remixes of the songs from it, most of which had not been released before. The tracks were mixed together, by DJ Pete Tong, so that they are played continuously without any gaps.

== Critical reception ==
Professional ratings
Review scores
Source	Rating
AllMusic	2.5/5 stars
Select	3/5

Select argued that the collection risked spreading the group's "fairly thin" appeal too far, but praised the All Star remix of "Never Ever" for its "production punch" and the Groovy Mix of "I Know Where It's At" for its "satisfying ferocity", while criticizing the album's later tracks for descending into "mainstream house mediocrity".

Sunday Mail stated that the album features "laid-back, jazzy rap" with "slightly irregular arrangements", but criticized that "much of this effort is drab" and that the remixes "lose heat as soon as it gets off the starting line", concluding that it "pales next to the studio album". The Evening Mail described the album as "a stop-gap release of the hits" put together by Pete Tong, noting that "this is best enjoyed by the seriously committed fan" and questioning whether it is "an essential Christmas party record or a cynical marketing ploy", concluding that it is "a little of both".

== Track listing ==
#	Title	Length
1.	"Never Ever" (All Star Remix)	3:59
2.	"Bootie Call" (Krazee Alley Mix)	4:37
3.	"I Know Where It's At" (Groovy Mix)	4:20
4.	"Under the Bridge" (Ignorants Remix featuring Jean Paul e.s.q.)	4:47
5.	"Lady Marmalade" (Timbaland Remix)	3:38
6.	"Bootie Call" (Bugcity and Hayne's/Bump 'n' Bounce mix)	4:11
7.	"War of Nerves" (Ganja Kru Remix)	5:22
8.	"Bootie Call" (Dreem Teem Vocal)	5:46
9.	"Bootie Call" (Club Asylum Boogie Punk Dub)	3:29
10.	"Never Ever" (Booker T's Vocal Mix)	5:44
11.	"Never Ever" (Booker T's Up North Dub)	5:30
12.	"I Know Where It's At" (Nu Birth Riddum Dub)	5:14
13.	"Lady Marmalade" (MARK!'s Wrecked Dub)	5:34
14.	"Lady Marmalade" (Sharp South Park Vocal Remix)	5:10
15.	"Lady Marmalade" (Sharp's Trade Lite Dub)	2:46

- In early pressings of the album, Timbaland's name was misprinted as Timberland.

== Personnel ==
Credits adapted from the album's booklet.

- Essential mix and selections by Pete Tong
- Mix engineer: Richard Evans @ Wise Budah
- Band management: John Benson Music Management Ltd
- Graphic design: Stuart Spalding

== Charts ==
Chart (1998)	Position
UK Albums Chart	104
