= Saints & Sinners (All Saints album) =

2000 studio album by All Saints

Studio album by All Saints
- Released: 16 October 2000
- Recorded: Air Studios, Conway Studios, Eastcote Studios, Guerilla Beach Studio, Home Recordings, Larrabee West, Metropolis, Olympic, Pierce Rooms, Rotation One Studios, Sarm West, Whitfield Street Studios
- Genres: Pop; dance; R&B
- Length: 52:53
- Label: London
- Producers: William Orbit; Karl "K-Gee" Gordon; Jonny Douglas; Cameron McVey; Paul Simm; Stuart Zender

All Saints chronology
The Remix Album (1998)	Saints & Sinners (2000)	All Hits (2001)

Singles from All Saints
- 1. "Pure Shores" Released: 14 February 2000; 2. "Black Coffee" Released: 2 October 2000; 3. "All Hooked Up" Released: 27 January 2001

Saints & Sinners is the second studio album by English girl group All Saints. It was released in 2000, three years after their debut album, All Saints. The album reached number one in the UK, their only album to do so. Three tracks on the album were produced by William Orbit, best known for his work with Madonna on her Ray of Light album. The album received mixed reviews from music critics, praising the singles and the new direction of music, while some felt it was too similar to the Spice Girls and Madonna's album Ray of Light.

Three singles were released from the album: "Pure Shores", "Black Coffee" and "All Hooked Up". Promo copies of the track "Surrender" began circulating in early January 2001, indicating it would have been the fourth proper single from the album had the group not disbanded soon after the album's release. The first single from the album, the Orbit-produced "Pure Shores", preceded the album by several months, having been previously released on the soundtrack for the 2000 film The Beach. It topped the UK singles chart and was certified double platinum. Second single "Black Coffee" also got to number one in the UK, whilst final single "All Hooked Up" peaked at number seven.

The majority of the songs were written by Shaznay Lewis and Karl Gordon. Melanie Blatt wrote two tracks on the album, "I Feel You" and "Ha Ha", the former track being written in dedication to her daughter, while Natalie Appleton co-wrote the track "Dreams" with Samantha Fox. Fox said she is credited on the song as "Karen Wilkin". Commercially, Saints & Sinners was not as successful as its preceding album.

== Background ==
In 1999, three of the group's members – Nicole Appleton, Natalie Appleton and Melanie Blatt – were approached by Dave Stewart to appear in the film Honest, playing the main characters. At the same time, remaining member Shaznay Lewis went to the United States to work with William Orbit, noted for his work with American singer and songwriter Madonna, on the songs and backing tracks for All Saints' second album, provisionally titled I Need the Mic. In December 1999, reports confirmed that All Saints had completed recording for the album, and set its release date for March or April 2000. "The album is finished and we are now mastering it. It has great tracks on it. We were even working on the mixing desks. We wanted to get involved with every aspect of the album right down to the final version," said Lewis.

== Singles ==
The album's first single was "Pure Shores". It was released as the lead single from the album by London Records in Australia, New Zealand, Canada, and United Kingdom on 12 September 1999, until a physical worldwide release occurred on 11 February 2000. The song was also used as the first single for the 2000 film The Beach and its soundtrack. Composed as a "futuristic dream-pop" song, "Pure Shores" received very positive reviews from music critics, many praising the group's vocals, musical composition, and lyrical content. Commercially, the song was a huge success, peaking high on the charts in many countries including Ireland, New Zealand, Italy, United Kingdom, Australia, Finland, France, and Switzerland. The song was released in Canada, but only charted at 35, and was their last single to chart in North America. The music video is set on the beach and features clips from the movie The Beach.

The album's second single was "Black Coffee". It was released by London Records worldwide on 2 October 2000. Composed as a dance-pop, trip hop, and electronica song, "Black Coffee" received positive reviews from music critics, many again praising the musical composition and the group's vocals. While not managing to reach the heights of lead single "Pure Shores", "Black Coffee" still reached number one in the United Kingdom, also charting in Australia, Ireland, Italy, New Zealand, Sweden, and Switzerland. The music video is set in a luxury apartment and on the rooftop of the apartment during the night.

The album's third and final single was "All Hooked Up". It was released by London Records worldwide on 27 January 2001. It was the group's last single prior to their temporary split. The song did not match the success of the album's previous singles, reaching no.7 in the United Kingdom, Ireland, New Zealand, and Switzerland. The video for "All Hooked Up" is set in a hotel room.

== Critical reception ==
Professional ratings
Review scores
Source	Rating
AllMusic	3/5 stars
The Daily Telegraph	5/5 stars
Dotmusic	2/5 stars
Entertainment.ie	4/5 stars
The Guardian	4/5 stars
The Independent	2/5 stars
Mixmag	3/5 stars
Q	2/5 stars
The Sydney Morning Herald	4/5 stars
Uncut	6/10

Saints & Sinners received mixed reviews from music critics. NME stated: "It's better than the new Spice Girls record. But really, that's not good enough." They criticised the group's lack of new musical direction, saying "[...] But since the release of their first album and their meteoric rise to tabloid infamy, they seem to be on a mission to tear down that credibility, brick by brick." Although praising the singles, they concluded that "For a British pop album, 'Saints And Sinners' is simply passable." Entertainment.ie however were more positive, giving it four stars out of five. They felt that "Saints and Sinners is a confident set of vibrant R'n'B songs driven by swirling dance rhythms and some luscious harmonies." They further judged: "At heart the Saints are superlative singers and the unique chemistry conjured up by their four individual voices makes this one of the best pop albums of the year."

Despite AllMusic not reviewing the album, they awarded it three stars out of five. They highlighted "Pure Shores", "Black Coffee" and "Dreams" as the album's standout tracks. Nigel Packer from BBC Music gave Saints & Sinners a positive review, but remarked: "It's a sign of just what Saints and Sinners might have been with Orbit at the helm throughout. Instead we're left with one strong EP trapped inside a pretty run-of-the-mill album."

== Commercial reception ==
Commercially, Saints & Sinners was not as successful as the group's self-titled debut album. While debuting at number eight on the New Zealand Albums Chart, it stayed in the chart for just five weeks. The album debuted at twenty-six on the Australian Albums Chart, and rose to peak at twenty. Although the album charted in the top fifty for three weeks, it was later certified Gold by ARIA. In Norway and Sweden, the album reached the top 20 (fifteen and nineteen, respectively) but lasted for less than a month in the charts (at four and three weeks, respectively).

The album was not so successful in Austria, where it debuted at twelve for two consecutive weeks and spent five weeks in the chart. It was more moderate in Switzerland, where it debuted at seven on the Swiss Albums Chart and charted for ten weeks. The album peaked at fourteen in Germany and endured for eleven weeks in the chart. The album was more successful in their native United Kingdom, where it peaked at number one for a sole week. It clocked up a total of twenty-three weeks in the chart.

== Track listing ==
Saints & Sinners track listing
No.	Title	Writer(s)	Producer(s)	Length
1.	"Pure Shores"	Shaznay Lewis; Susannah Melvoin; William Orbit	Orbit	4:28
2.	"All Hooked Up"	Lewis; Karl Gordon	K-Gee	3:48
3.	"Dreams"	Natalie Appleton; Cris Bonacci; Karen Wilkin; Orbit	Cameron McVey; Paul Simm; Orbit^{[a]}	4:24
4.	"Distance"	Lewis; Gordon; Kyle McCray	Gordon	4:25
5.	"Black Coffee"	Kirsty Elizabeth; Tom Nichols; Alex Von Soos	Orbit	4:45
6.	"Whoopin' Over You"	Lewis; Jonny Douglas	Douglas	4:04
7.	"I Feel You"	Melanie Blatt; Russell Nash; Femi Williams; Stuart Zender	Zender; Femi Fem	5:35
8.	"Surrender"	Lewis; Orbit	Orbit	5:10
9.	"Ha Ha"	Blatt; Douglas	Douglas	4:08
10.	"Love Is Love"	Blatt; Douglas	Douglas	4:06
11.	"Ready, Willing and Able"	Lewis; Gordon	Gordon	3:36
12.	"Saints & Sinners"	Lewis; Gordon; Michelle Escoffery	Gordon	4:15

UK edition bonus tracks
No.	Title	Writer(s)	Producer(s)	Length
13.	"I Don't Wanna Be Alone"	Lewis; Gordon; Wayne Hector; Alistair Tennant	K-Gee	4:15
14.	"One More Tequila"	Lewis; Gordon	Gordon	3:42

Australian edition bonus tracks
No.	Title	Writer(s)	Producer(s)	Length
13.	"Pure Shores" (2 Da Beach U Don't Stop Remix)	Lewis; Orbit	Orbit; K-Gee^{[a]}	5:00
14.	"Black Coffee" (The Neptunes remix)	LElizabeth; Nichols; Von Soos	Orbit; The Neptunes^{[a]}	4:45

Notes

- ^{^[a]} signifies additional producer(s)

== Charts ==
=== Weekly charts ===
Chart (2000)	Peak position
Australian Albums (ARIA)	20
Australian Dance Albums (ARIA)	9
Austrian Albums (Ö3 Austria)	12
Belgian Albums (Ultratop Flanders)	27
Belgian Albums (Ultratop Wallonia)	39
Dutch Albums (Album Top 100)	16
European Albums (Music & Media)	4
Finnish Albums (Suomen virallinen lista)	19
French Albums (SNEP)	36
German Albums (Offizielle Top 100)	14
Greek Albums (IFPI)	8
Hungarian Albums (MAHASZ)	21
Irish Albums (IRMA)	2
Italian Albums (FIMI)	22
Japanese Albums (Oricon)	65
New Zealand Albums (RMNZ)	8
Norwegian Albums (VG-lista)	15
Scottish Albums (Official Charts)	1
Swedish Albums (Sverigetopplistan)	10
Swiss Albums (Schweizer Hitparade)	7
UK Albums (Official Charts)	1

=== Year-end charts ===
Chart (2000)	Position
Swiss Albums (Schweizer Hitparade)	99
UK Albums (OCC)	29
Chart (2001)	Position
UK Albums (OCC)	153

== Certifications and sales ==
Region	Certification	Certified units/sales
Australia (ARIA)	Gold	35,000^{^}
Denmark (IFPI Danmark)	Gold	25,000^{^}
United Kingdom (BPI)	2× Platinum	610,000
Summaries
Europe (IFPI)	Platinum	1,000,000^{*}
^{*} Sales figures based on certification alone.^{^} Shipments figures based on certification alone.
