= All Hooked Up =

2001 single by All Saints

Single by All Saints

from the album Saints & Sinners
- Released: 15 January 2001
- Studio: Pierce Rooms (London, England)
- Genre: R&B; P-Funk; hip hop
- Length: 3:48
- Label: London
- Songwriters: Shaznay Lewis; Karl Gordon
- Producer: K-Gee

All Saints singles chronology
"Black Coffee" (2000)	"All Hooked Up" (2001)	"Rock Steady" (2006)

Music video
- "All Hooked Up" on YouTube

"All Hooked Up" is a song by English-Canadian girl group All Saints from their second album, Saints & Sinners (2000). London Records released the song as the third and last single from the album on 15 January 2001.

== Composition and lyrical interpretation ==
"All Hooked Up" is a hip hop, P-funk, and R&B song. The Guardian's Caroline Sullivan commented that the group sings "'I know that you want a piece of mah ass' under the misapprehension that they're Mary J Blige", and that when Lewis sings "Why's this guy all up in my ass?", it "doesn't make her sound like anything but an English girl trying to do ghetto-fab". The Sunday People's Sean O'Brien called it a "mid tempo song with a great groove created with a plodding bass, lots of P-Funk style and raunchy lyrics".

== Reception ==
=== Critical response ===
"All Hooked Up" received generally favourable reviews from music critics. Sean O'Brien of The Sunday People gave the song a rating of eight out of ten, deeming it a "dirty sexy track with a lot of attitude" and "a great groove". Jon O'Brien from AllMusic likened it to songs by Lucy Pearl. The Sunday Herald praised the track for "maintaining the Saints' trademark tough-girl buffalo stance" and "cowboy-hat-wearing sass". Similarly, Nigel Packer from BBC News commended the song's lyrics which he felt had "bags of attitude". John Walshe of the Hot Press wrote: "Time has not curbed their libidos one iota, thankfully, nor their independence."

Russell Baillie of The New Zealand Herald criticised the group for fixating the lyrics on their buttocks and "trying desperately to be TLC". John Robinson of the NME found the lyrics weird and discomforting to be sung by the group and "like someone reading from a textbook on foundry work, translated from the original Hungarian", and dismissed the song as "woozy cheese music". In 2016, Lewis Corner from Digital Spy placed "All Hooked Up" at number nine in his ranking of All Saints singles, calling it "a so-so hip-hop-lite number that's about as gritty as a suburban cul-de-sac" and "not quite the swansong their fans were after at the time".

=== Chart performance ===
Although expected to debut at number one, "All Hooked Up" debuted at number seven on the UK Singles Chart dated 27 January 2001, becoming All Saints' eighth consecutive top 10 single in the UK. It dropped to number 28 in its second week and went on to spend a total of 14 weeks on the chart. As of November 2006, "All Hooked Up" has sold 54,699 copies in the UK. It is the group's ninth best-selling single in the UK according to the Official Charts Company. Elsewhere, "All Hooked Up" charted in Ireland (number 18), the Netherlands (number 95), and Switzerland (number 96). In New Zealand, the song peaked at number 50 on the New Zealand Singles Chart for two consecutive weeks.

== Music video ==
The accompanying music video for "All Hooked Up" was directed by Douglas Avery. The video was filmed over two days in London. The stunts done in the visual were painstakingly choreographed with no special effects. The video aired on 11 December 2000. At the time, the group was on the verge of splitting up because of internal arguing, and a further source of friction occurred when Melanie Blatt mimed to Natalie Appleton's voice on the video. The music video itself features All Saints rooting out men in their motel rooms and then throwing them through windows, walls and closed doors.

== Live performances ==
All Saints pulled out of two television appearances after bosses wanted the group to change the lyrics to "All Hooked Up". A spokesperson for the band told that the band were asked to change the lyric "you want a piece of my ass" from the song for their appearances on both CD:UK on 6 January and T4 the day after. However, the spokesperson said the girls considered the line "an integral part" of the song, and did not want to change it for the shows. He added: "They've not snubbed it or anything, they're aware that it is a kids programme".

== Track listings ==
- CD1 single
1. "All Hooked Up" (Single Version) – 3:49
2. "All Hooked Up" (Architechs Vocal Mix) – 4:09
3. "All Hooked Up" (K-Gee Remix Edit) – 3:26
- CD2 single
1. "All Hooked Up" (Single Version) – 3:49
2. "Black Coffee" (Version 2) – 5:01
3. "Never Ever" – 6:27
4. "All Hooked Up" (Video) – 3:49
- CD maxi-single
1. "All Hooked Up" (Single Version) – 3:49
2. "All Hooked Up" (Architechs Vocal Mix) – 4:09
3. "All Hooked Up" (K-Gee Remix Edit) – 3:26
4. "All Hooked Up" (Video) – 3:49
- Cassette single
1. "All Hooked Up" (Single Version) – 3:49
2. "All Hooked Up" (Architechs Vocal Mix) – 4:09

== Personnel ==
Personnel are adapted from the liner notes of Saints & Sinners.

- Shaznay Lewis – writing, vocals, vocal arrangement
- Karl "K-Gee" Gordon – writer, production
- Mark "Spike" Stent – mixing
- Melanie Blatt – vocals
- Nicole Appleton – vocals
- Natalie Appleton – vocals
- Jan Kybert – Pro Tools mix engineerinh
- Aaron Prattley – assistant mix engineering
- Octave – keys
- Andrew Smith – guitar
- Damien Taylor – additional editing
- Neil Aldridge – recording
- Richard Wilkinson – recording assistance
- Zak – recording assistance

== Charts ==
Chart (2001)	Peak position
Belgium (Ultratip Bubbling Under Flanders)	16
Belgium (Ultratip Bubbling Under Wallonia)	8
Croatia (HRT)	10
Europe (Eurochart Hot 100)	32
Ireland (IRMA)	18
Netherlands (Dutch Top 40 Tipparade)	11
Netherlands (Single Top 100)	95
New Zealand (Recorded Music NZ)	50
Scottish Singles Sales (Official Charts)	8
Switzerland (Schweizer Hitparade)	96
UK Singles (Official Charts)	7
UK Airplay (Music Week)	4

== Release history ==
Region	Date	Format(s)	Label(s)	Ref.
United Kingdom	15 January 2001	CD; cassette	London	
Australia	5 March 2001	CD	London	
