= Truce (group) =

British female R&B trio of the 1990s

- Origin: UK
- Genres: R&B
- Years active: 1995–1998
- Label: Big Life
- Past members: Dianne Joseph; Janine Linton; Michelle Escoffery

Truce were an all-female British R&B trio in the 1990s, consisting of lead singer Dianne Joseph, Janine Linton and Michelle Escoffery. Their biggest hit was "Eyes Don't Lie" which reached number 20 on the UK Singles Chart in 1998. They released their first album, Nothin' But the Truce in 1995 and had disbanded by 1998.

Escoffery continued to work as a singer, such as on K-Gee's debut album Bounce to This including the 2000 single "I Don't Really Care", and on Artful Dodger's 2001 hit "Think About Me". Joseph featured on a number of collaborations by Shy FX and T-Power including the top 20 hits "Shake Ur Body" and "Don't Wanna Know".

== Discography ==
=== Albums ===
- Nothin' But the Truce (1995)
- Truce EP (1995)

=== Singles ===
- "Celebration of Life" (1994) - UK #51
- "The Finest" (1995) - UK #54
- "Treat U Right" (1995) - UK #90
- "Nothin' But a Party" (1997) - UK #71
- "Eyes Don't Lie" (1998) - UK #20
