= Black Coffee (All Saints song) =

2000 song by British girl group All Saints

Single by All Saints

from the album Saints & Sinners
- B-side: "I Don't Wanna Be Alone"
- Released: 2 October 2000
- Studio: Guerilla Beach, Larrabee West (Los Angeles); Sarm West, Olympic (London, England)
- Genre: Electropop; acid techno; R&B
- Length: 4:49
- Label: London
- Songwriters: Tom Nichols; Alexander von Soos; Kirsty Bertarelli
- Producer: William Orbit

All Saints singles chronology
"Pure Shores" (2000)	"Black Coffee" (2000)	"All Hooked Up" (2001)

Music video
- "Black Coffee" on YouTube

"Black Coffee" is a song by English girl group All Saints from their second studio album, Saints & Sinners (2000). It was released on 2 October 2000 by London Records as the album's second single. The track was produced by William Orbit, and written by Tom Nichols, Alexander von Soos and Kirsty Bertarelli (credited as Kirsty Elizabeth), initially intended as a single for Kirsty under the title "I Wouldn't Wanna Be". It is a mellow electropop, acid techno and R&B song, unique for its production-laden sound featuring breathy keyboards, glitching electronics and elements of ambient music. A wistful love song, its lyrics stem from Kirsty's relationship with Swiss entrepreneur Ernesto Bertarelli, detailing feelings of love at first sight and contentment.

The track was met with general acclaim from music critics who likened it to the group's previous single "Pure Shores" for their wistful chorus delivery and Orbit's distinctive production. Its unconventional structure was also cited as influential upon the sound of later girl groups such as the Sugababes and Girls Aloud. A commercial success, "Black Coffee" marked All Saints' fifth and final number-one single in the UK. It also reached the top 10 in Ireland, Italy, the Netherlands, New Zealand and Sweden.

Bo Johan Renck directed the accompanying music video which features the group serenading an arguing couple in bullet time in a high rise apartment block. All Saints promoted "Black Coffee" with live performances on CD:UK, Children in Need, Later... with Jools Holland, Top of the Pops and at the 2000 Smash Hits Poll Winners Party. Much group in-fighting happened during the promotion of the single, prompting tense live renditions and eventually causing the group to split up in 2001, acrimoniously.

== Background ==
"Black Coffee" was written by Tom Nichols, Alexander von Soos and Kirsty Bertarelli. It is the only All Saints original single not to be written by group member Shaznay Lewis. The song was initially recorded by Kirsty Bertarelli under the title "I Wouldn't Wanna Be". She first wrote the song, basing it on her relationship with Swiss entrepreneur Ernesto Bertarelli who she met on his yacht off the coast of Sardinia in 1997. Gary Davies, a BBC Radio 1 DJ and Kirsty's manager, passed on the track's production to Nichols who was also under his management at the time. Nichols developed "I Wouldn't Wanna Be" as a quirky pop song, something "slightly out of the ordinary" and "slightly left of centre, not completely mainstream".

Believing the track could be established as a single for Bertarelli, Davies canvassed record companies with her demo, hoping it could result in a major label deal for the singer. The song received a positive reaction from London Records where Davies played it to the label's executive Tracy Bennett. However, Bennett was unimpressed with Bertarelli's potential and wanted "I Wouldn't Wanna Be" to be recorded by his group All Saints instead which Davies, Kirsty and Nichols all agreed to.

== New arrangement and recording ==
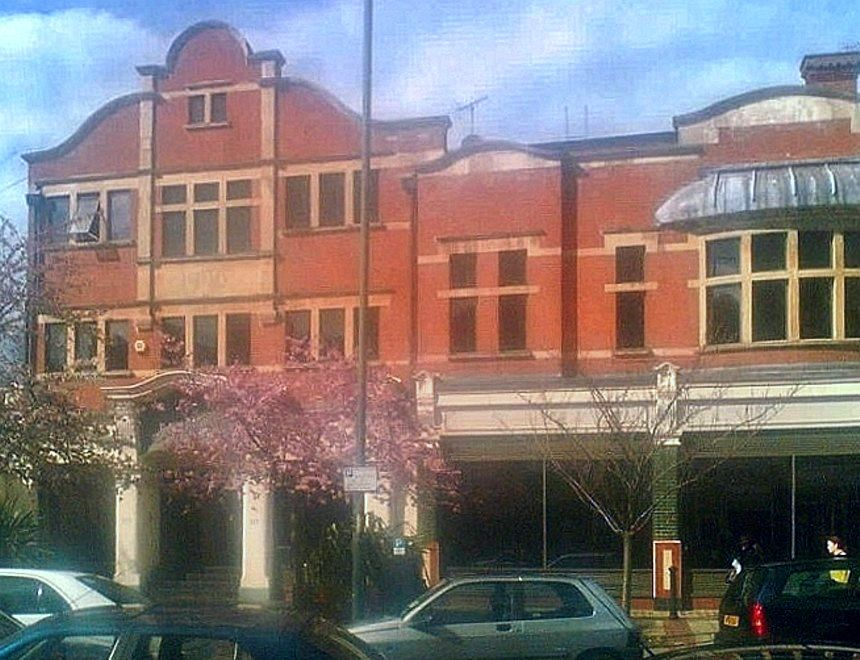
Olympic Studios, one of the four studios in which All Saints recorded "Black Coffee".

After much time had passed since the recording arrangement, Nichols stressed whether All Saints were going to record the song at all. Over 40 songs were written for the group's second album, Saints & Sinners, for which William Orbit was enlisted to produce, but Orbit's popularity at the time made it difficult for All Saints to meet with him in studio. It was only after the release of the album's lead single "Pure Shores" in February 2000 that they began working on a follow-up together. Orbit along with Lewis and group member Melanie Blatt gave "I Wouldn't Wanna Be" a new arrangement and renamed the song "Black Coffee".

Recording took place at Guerilla Beach and Larrabee West in Los Angeles, and at Sarm West and Olympic Studios in London. According to Blatt, their collaboration with Orbit allowed All Saints to explore more experimental genres than those of their previous releases, while Nichols viewed Orbit's production in the new arrangement completely different, and better than that of his own on the original. The "Black Coffee" sessions were more frustrating for group member Natalie Appleton who saw the song as an opportunity for fellow member Nicole Appleton and herself to sing lead vocals for a change because it was not written by Lewis. In the Appletons' 2002 autobiography Together, Natalie wrote that Lewis was "staking her claim" by arriving early for the first session because Blatt sang lead vocals on "Pure Shores" and not her. Per Natalie's suggestion, management eventually let her cut a lead vocal, but she was nervous during the recording and believed they were placating her. "Without support, it is hard to do your best," Natalie recalled in Together, adding that she felt "used and slacked off".

== Music and lyrics ==
"Black Coffee"
A 29-second sample of the song's outro sung by group member Shaznay Lewis.

"Black Coffee" is composed in the time signature of common time with a moderately fast tempo of 120 beats per minute, following a chord progression of E–Bm–D–A in the chorus and Bm_{7}–E–Bm_{7}–E elsewhere. It is an electropop song with elements of acid techno, ambient and R&B music. The song has an unconventional structure with different sections being dislocated from one another. It is also unique for being more production-laden in comparison with other pop songs.

"Black Coffee" opens with a stark introduction sung by Lewis, accompanied only by glitching electronics with no chord progression, before going into the pre-chorus where a more mellow sequence featuring breathy keyboards begin playing. In the chorus, the song becomes wistful featuring Natalie on lead vocals singing a call and response with Blatt. A subsequent verse sung by Lewis returns to the eerie and sinister sound of her introduction. After the second chorus, the song enters into a bridge where the group hum and Lewis sings two lines from the pre-chorus, "Each moment is cool / Freeze the moment". The track later ends in an outro sung by Lewis using the same lyrics and starker sound from her introduction, but enhanced by guitar, synths and welding, clipped dance rhythms.

A sad love song, the lyrics narrate feelings of love at first sight and contentment. According to Kirsty, "Black Coffee" recalls how she met Bertarelli during a time when they did a lot of sailing near Sardinia and did not want to be elsewhere. Some of the lyrics suggest disharmony and bitterness during the relationship, chronicling more domestic scenarios such as chain smoking and drinking black coffee. The song also has a gender bender theme, encouraging women to make "the first move" instead of men.

== Release ==
London Records serviced "Black Coffee" to UK radio on 22 August 2000 and released it physically on 2 October 2000 as the second single from Saints & Sinners. It was accompanied by the B-side "I Don't Wanna Be Alone", written by Lewis, Ali Tennant, Wayne Hector and K-Gee. Ellen von Unwerth photographed the single's cover art. Several remixes were commissioned, including one by the Wideboys, and another by the Neptunes which featured a rap by American duo Clipse. In Japan, "Black Coffee" was released as a CD single on 12 October 2000. In January 2001, an alternate mix of "Black Coffee" was released as a B-side to the album's third single "All Hooked Up".

== Critical reception ==
"Black Coffee" received acclaim from music critics upon release. Simon Evans writing in the Birmingham Post described the song as a "beautiful slice of haunting, hypnotic pop". John Mulvey of The Scotsman praised its "sleek, scrupulously mature sound", while AllMusic's Jon O'Brien regarded it among All Saints' most accomplished and mature work, highlighting its "lush electronics". David Brinn of The Jerusalem Post found the song wistful and radio-friendly. In the Sunday Herald, Samuel McGuire characterised the track as "a gem of a truly wonderous lustre"; the newspaper's Graeme Virtue hailed it as one of "the best pop singles ever". BBC Music's Nigel Packer chose the song as a highlight on Saints & Sinners, while Russell Baillie of The New Zealand Herald said "Black Coffee" along with "Pure Shores" and "Surrender" "put [most of the album] in the shade." The Sunday People's Sean O'Brien gave "Black Coffee" a rating of eight out of ten.

In the NME, Siobhan Grogan called the song almost perfect, writing that "it's wistful in all the right places and makes sadness sound rather alluring like only the bitterest love songs can." Grogan also compared it to "Pure Shores" saying that it "has the same mellow, glossy haziness to it, as if they recorded it lying down." Similarly, Eva Simpson of the Daily Mirror wrote that the track "brought the same high-gloss sheen" as "Pure Shores" and cited it as a curtain raiser for Saints & Sinners. A Western Mail reviewer viewed the two songs as "equally tremendous", while The Guardian's Caroline Sullivan found "Black Coffee" superior, describing it as "beguiling treatment of a domestic scenario" and "easily the most alluring depiction of a bleary-eyed morning routine ever recorded." Sullivan also said All Saints "lend radiance to [Orbit's] twinkling fairy lights." Lindsay Baker from the same newspaper deemed it Saints & Sinners' "particularly infectious" track, while R.S. Murthi of the New Straits Times called it the album's most endearing song, likening it to releases by the Cocteau Twins. In a negative review, Hot Press magazine's John Walshe dismissed the group's harmonies as "so saccharine they could have been copyrighted by NutraSweet".

"Black Coffee" appeared on Dotmusic and the NME's year-end lists at number 3 and 26 respectively. Q magazine included it in its list of 1010 Songs You Must Own. "Black Coffee" has continued to receive praise in retrospective reviews. According to the Daily Mirror's Ian Sturgess, the track "boasts one of the most infectious pop choruses of all time." Clem Bastow of The Sydney Morning Herald said the song in particular won All Saints "major critical points" over the Spice Girls and complemented their "impeccable back catalogue". In the Daily Record, Julie MacCaskill wrote that "Black Coffee" along with "Pure Shores", "Under the Bridge" and "Never Ever" are a testament to the group's "pop power". Christie Leo writing in the New Straits Times opined, "The aromatic shimmer of 'Black Coffee' alone is all the evidence you'll need to know that All Saints were truly heavenly." In 2016, Digital Spy's Lewis Corner placed the song at number three in his ranking of All Saints singles, highlighting its "euphoric" chorus and deeming it "pop-form caffeine".

== Chart performance ==
In October 2000, "Black Coffee" debuted at number one on the UK Singles Chart with first-week sales of 60,000 copies, making All Saints only the second girl group, after the Spice Girls, to achieve five number-one singles in the UK. The song dropped to number three in its second week and spent 21 weeks on the chart in total. It was certified silver by the British Phonographic Industry (BPI) in October 2000, and sold 273,000 copies in the UK by November 2018. According to the Official Charts Company, "Black Coffee" is the group's fourth best-selling single in the UK.

The song also had success across Europe, peaking at number five on the European Hot 100 Singles chart for two consecutive weeks, and reaching the top 10 in Ireland, Italy, the Netherlands (Dutch Top 40) and Sweden, and the top 20 in Finland and Norway. In Australia, the track entered the ARIA Singles Chart at number 29 and peaked at number 20 for two consecutive weeks. On the New Zealand Singles Chart, it debuted at number 40 and reached number seven, marking All Saints' fifth top 10 single there. The international success of "Black Coffee" helped launch both Kirsty's and Nichols' musical careers. Kirsty earned royalties of over £12,000, while Nichols stated in an interview for HitQuarters, "when that song was released, the opportunities that [I got] certainly in the UK, but also Europe-wide, [were] absolutely huge."

== Music video ==
Directed by Bo Johan Renck, the music video for "Black Coffee" was filmed at Ealing Studios in London on 17 August 2000. Renck specially edited it as All Saints were not on speaking terms at the time and requested for their scenes to be shot separately. According to a report by the Daily Mirror, the group formed two camps with the Appletons on one side, and Lewis and Blatt on the other. Bullet time effects similar to that from the 1999 film The Matrix were used, being considered state of the art at the time. The video aired on 4 September 2000 to heavy rotation from MTV Europe.

Melanie Blatt serenading an arguing couple in the music video.

Opening with a night time view of a high rise apartment block, the music video sees the group singing from the block's rooftop. A couple are shown arguing in one of the apartments while the group appear invisible beside them. The couple throw clothes and pillows at each other, among other things. Their aggressive behaviour is frozen each time while the group serenade them. The girlfriend later sits in a corner and cries before the video ends with frozen shots of each All Saints member in the apartment after the couple have left.

Jon Stewart, author of Oh Blessed Holy Caffeine Tree: Coffee in Popular Music, wrote that the video put emphasis on the romantic disharmony of the lyrics. Stewart also noted that the video's upmarket location promoted caffeine as a beverage for the upper class. CBC Television placed "Black Coffee" at number five in its ranking of the group's music videos, praising the special effects and combination of "an angelic serenade during an argument". Digital Spy's Lewis Corner said the video portrayed when cracks within All Saints began showing; "There's a reason they don't appear alongside each other in the music video: by then, they couldn't physically stand each other."

== Live performances ==
To promote "Black Coffee" in September and October 2000, All Saints performed it on television shows such as CD:UK, the BBC People's Awards, T4, Top of the Pops and the Pepsi Chart Show. On 18 November 2000, the group performed "Black Coffee" along with "Pure Shores" and "Whoopin' Over You" on Later... with Jools Holland. A number of All Saints' renditions of "Black Coffee" were marred by in-group tension and fighting. The group were not on speaking terms at the time of their Children in Need performance on 17 November 2000 after Nicole announced her pregnancy the night before. According to the Appleton sisters, they were completely ignored by Lewis and Blatt during their performance at the Smash Hits Poll Winners Party on 10 December 2000. The performance was later criticised by The Guardian's Betty Clarke who wrote, "Only All Saints let the side down, going through the motions..." At the Capital FM Christmas Party, Natalie and Lewis nearly came to blows backstage over who would wear a particular jacket causing an onstage rift during the performance and ultimately, All Saints splitting up the following year.

In 2014, All Saints reunited and performed "Black Coffee" as part of their setlist as special guests on the Backstreet Boys' In a World Like This Tour. The group also performed the song during their Red Flag Tour in 2016, and as an opening act for Take That's 2017 tour, Wonderland Live.

== Impact and usage in media ==
The Scotman's Fiona Shepherd wrote that the "smart-pop attack" of "Black Coffee" paved the way for British girl groups such as Girls Aloud and Sugababes. Similarly, Irish singer Neil Hannon cited the song's unconventional production as influential; "Girls Aloud do pop like ['Black Coffee'] now: songs like 'Biology' are a bit weird, and they flout the general rules, and I admire that. But 'Black Coffee' is better." In 2007, the track was included in the competitive music video game series SingStar.

In 2004, German musician Markus Guentner used the chorus and some samples for his track of the same name, which was released on his Detective Stories EP (Ware Recordings).

In December 2023, Center Parcs used the track in a UK TV advertising campaign.

== Formats and track listings ==
- CD1 and cassette single
1. "Black Coffee" – 4:49
2. "I Don't Wanna Be Alone" – 4:20
3. "Black Coffee" (ATFC's Freshly Ground vocal) – 7:46
- CD2 single
1. "Black Coffee" – 4:49
2. "Black Coffee" (The Neptunes remix) – 4:43
3. "Black Coffee" (The Wideboys Espresso mix) – 5:19
- CD maxi-single
1. "Black Coffee" – 4:49
2. "I Don't Wanna Be Alone" – 4:20
3. "Black Coffee" (The Wideboys Espresso mix) – 5:19
4. "Black Coffee" (ATFC's Freshly Ground vocal) – 7:46
- 7-inch single
1. "Black Coffee" – 4:49
2. "I Don't Wanna Be Alone" – 4:20
- 12-inch single (The Remixes)
1. "Black Coffee" (ATFC's Freshly Ground vocal) – 7:46
2. "Black Coffee" (The Neptunes remix) – 4:43
3. "Black Coffee" (The Wideboys Espresso mix) – 5:19
4. "Black Coffee" (Shadow Snipers vocal mix) – 6:21

== Personnel ==
Credits are adapted from the liner notes of Saints & Sinners.

- Shaznay Lewis – new arrangement, vocals, vocal arrangement
- Melanie Blatt – new arrangement, vocals, vocal arrangement
- William Orbit – new arrangement, producer, vocal arrangement, guitar, keyboards, synths
- Mark "Spike" Stent – mixing
- Clif Norrell – engineer
- Ren Swan – engineer
- Sean Spuehler – engineer, Pro Tools, programming, keyboards
- Iain Robertson – engineer
- Tom Hannen – assistant engineer
- Michelle Forbes – assistant engineer
- Nicole Appleton – vocals
- Natalie Appleton – vocals
- Jan Kybert – Pro Tools mix engineer, assistant mix engineer

== Charts ==
=== Weekly charts ===
Weekly chart performance for "Black Coffee"
Chart (2000)	Peak position
Australia (ARIA)	20
Belgium (Ultratop 50 Flanders)	42
Belgium (Ultratop 50 Wallonia)	39
Croatia International (HRT) (Note: Only a partial archive of the Croatian chart is available so it is possible that the single had a higher peak.)	8
European Hot 100 Singles (Billboard)	5
European Radio Top 50 (Music & Media)	2
Finland (Suomen virallinen lista)	11
France (SNEP)	33
Germany (GfK)	31
Ireland (IRMA)	6
Italy (FIMI)	7
Netherlands (Dutch Top 40)	9
Netherlands (Single Top 100)	24
New Zealand (Recorded Music NZ)	7
Norway (VG-lista)	14
Scottish Singles Sales (Official Charts)	3
Sweden (Sverigetopplistan)	8
Switzerland (Schweizer Hitparade)	28
UK Singles (Official Charts)	1
UK Airplay (Music Week)	1

=== Year-end charts ===
Year-end chart performance for "Black Coffee"
Chart (2000)	Position
Ireland (IRMA)	86
Sweden (Hitlistan)	97
UK Singles (OCC)	60
UK Airplay (Music Week)	22

== Certifications ==
Certifications and sales for "Black Coffee"
Region	Certification	Certified units/sales
United Kingdom (BPI)	Silver	273,000

== See also ==
- List of UK Singles Chart number ones of the 2000s

== Bibliography ==
- Appleton, Natalie & Nicole (2002). Together. Michael Joseph Ltd. ISBN 0-7181-4544-5.
