= Bootie Call =

1998 single by All Saints

Single by All Saints

from the album All Saints
- B-side: "Get Down"
- Released: 31 August 1998
- Genre: Electro-funk
- Length: 3:36
- Label: London
- Songwriters: Shaznay Lewis; Karl Gordon
- Producer: Karl Gordon

All Saints singles chronology
"Under the Bridge" / "Lady Marmalade" (1998)	"Bootie Call" (1998)	"War of Nerves" (1998)

Music video
- "Bootie Call" on YouTube

"Bootie Call" is a song by English girl group All Saints from their debut album, All Saints (1998). The song was written by group member Shaznay Lewis and its producer Karl Gordon. "Bootie Call" was released on 31 August 1998 by London Records as the fourth single (and fifth overall (Note: "Let's Get Started" was released as the second single in Japan only in November 1997.)) from the album. "Bootie Call" achieved chart success, topping the UK Singles Chart on 6 September 1998 and becoming the group's third consecutive number-one single. Internationally, it charted in the top 10 in Iceland, Ireland, the Netherlands, and on the Eurochart Hot 100.

== Music video ==
A music video was produced to promote the single. It featured All Saints sitting and lying down in an open top car while singing the song. There was also clips of a group of people walking down the street wearing matching outfits, various people being silly with the phone, break dancing in the street and a woman playing golf on top of the phone box.

== Track listing ==
UK CD1

1. "Bootie Call" (single version)
2. "Bootie Call 98" (The Director's Kutt)
3. "Get Down"

UK CD2

1. "Bootie Call" (single version)
2. "Never Ever" (Booker T's vocal mix)
3. "I Know Where It's At"
4. "Bootie Call" (promo video)

UK cassette single

1. "Bootie Call" (single version)
2. "Bootie Call" (Club Asylum Skank vocal mix)

== Charts ==
=== Weekly charts ===
Chart (1998–1999)	Peak position
Australia (ARIA)	59
Belgium (Ultratop 50 Flanders)	34
Belgium (Ultratop 50 Wallonia)	25
Europe (Eurochart Hot 100)	10
Iceland (Íslenski Listinn Topp 40)	8
Ireland (IRMA)	9
Netherlands (Dutch Top 40)	5
Netherlands (Single Top 100)	8
Scotland Singles (OCC)	2
Sweden (Sverigetopplistan)	31
UK Singles (OCC)	1
UK Airplay (Music Week)	6
UK Hip Hop/R&B (OCC)	1

=== Year-end charts ===
Chart (1998)	Position
Iceland (Íslenski Listinn Topp 40)	76
Netherlands (Dutch Top 40)	81
Netherlands (Single Top 100)	83
UK Singles (OCC)	70

== Certifications ==
Region	Certification	Certified units/sales
United Kingdom (BPI)	Silver	258,000
