= Never Felt Like This Before =

Single by Shaznay Lewis

from the album Open
- Released: 5 July 2004
- Recorded: Chill Building, Santa Monica
- Length: 3:51
- Label: London
- Songwriter(s): Shaznay Lewis; Rick Nowels
- Producer(s): Rick Nowels

Shaznay Lewis singles chronology
"Never Felt Like This Before" (2004)	"You" (2004)

"Never Felt Like This Before" is the debut solo single by English singer Shaznay Lewis, released in July 2004. Written by Lewis and Rick Nowels, the song is from Lewis's first solo album Open (2004). The single peaked at number 8 on the UK Singles Chart and reached the top twenty in New Zealand.

== Music video ==
The music video for "Never Felt Like This Before" is directed by Tim Royes, and is set in a nightclub setting with Lewis performing and with episodes of her love affairs intermixed with the performance. In the video for "Never Felt Like This Before", Lewis felt uncomfortable performing intimate moments with the male in the video because she felt she would be cheating on her partner, Christian Storm. They originally planned to have Lewis's partner in the video, but he was unavailable at the time, so they had to find a look-alike.

== Track listings ==
CD single 1
No.	Title	Writer(s)	Producer(s)	Length
1.	"Never Felt Like This Before"	Shaznay Lewis; Rick Nowels	Nowels	3:51
2.	"Never Felt Like This Before" (KO! Remix)	Lewis; Nowels	Nowels; K-Gee^{[a]}; Octave^{[a]}	4:29

CD single 2
No.	Title	Writer(s)	Producer(s)	Length
1.	"Never Felt Like This Before"	Lewis; Nowels	Nowels	3:51
2.	"Safe"	Lewis; Tom Nichols; Tommy D.	Kevin Bacon; Jonathan Quarmby	4:08
3.	"Never Felt Like This Before" (Music video)			3:54

Notes

- ^{^[a]} denotes additional producer

== Personnel and credits ==
Credits adapted from the liner notes of Open.

- Rusy Anderson – electric guitar
- Paul Bushnell – bass
- Nikki Harris – background vocals
- Kevin Kerrigan – drums
- Greg Kurstin – keyboards
- Shaznay Lewis – lyrics and music, vocals
- Rick Nowels – instruments, lyrics and music, producer
- Tim Pierce – electric guitar
- Wayne Rodrigues – drums, keyboards

== Charts ==
Chart (2004)	Peak position
Germany (GfK)	82
Ireland (IRMA)	35
New Zealand (Recorded Music NZ)	19
UK Singles (OCC)	8
UK Hip Hop/R&B (OCC)	3
