= Pages (Shaznay Lewis album) =

Studio album by Shaznay Lewis
- Released: 17 May 2024
- Genre: Pop; R&B
- Length: 46:45
- Label: 1.9.7.5
- Producer: Ben Cullum; Ant Whiting; Jez Ashurst; Johan Hugo; Michael Angelo

Shaznay Lewis chronology
Open (2004)	Pages (2024)

Singles from Pages
- 1. "Miracle" Released: 12 January 2024; 2. "Kiss of Life" Released: 1 February 2024; 3. "Good Mourning" Released: 12 April 2024; 4. "Got to Let Go" Released: 3 May 2024

Pages is the second studio album by English singer-songwriter Shaznay Lewis, released through her independent record label 1.9.7.5 Recordings on 17 May 2024. It is Lewis' first album in 20 years and features collaborations with Self Esteem, Shola Ama and General Levy. Lewis launched the album with her first solo headlining show at The Jazz Cafe on 14 May 2024.

== Release and promotion ==
Lewis partnered with Absolute Label Services for the manufacturing and distribution of Pages. On 29 January 2024, the album was made available for pre-order on CD, and limited edition white vinyl and cassette tape formats. A CD with an art card signed by Lewis was made available exclusively on Amazon. A signed test pressing, and various bundles with T-shirts and signed prints were sold on Lewis' webstore. To promote Pages, Lewis appeared on Sunday Brunch on 4 February. On 11 February, she performed "Kiss of Life" with the BBC Concert Orchestra in BBC Radio 2's Piano Room. On 30 April, Lewis appeared on The One Show. Lewis launched the album with a headlining show at The Jazz Cafe in Camden Town on 14 May. She is scheduled to play Nocturne Live, Mighty Hoopla and Glastonbury Festival in June, and Party in the Park in September.

=== Singles ===
The lead single "Miracle" was released on 12 January 2024. It entered the UK Singles Downloads Chart at number 80. "Kiss of Life" was released on 1 February as the second single, accompanied by a music video directed by Oscar J Ryan. The single peaked at number 84 on UK Singles Downloads Chart. On 12 April, "Good Mourning" featuring Shola Ama and General Levy was released as the third single alongside a music video directed by Ryan. "Got to Let Go" was released as the fourth single on 3 May.

== Critical reception ==
Professional ratings
Review scores
Source	Rating
Classic Pop	4/5 stars
The Line of Best Fit	9/10
The Observer	3/5 stars
The Scotsman	3/5 stars

In his review for The Line of Best Fit, Quentin Harrison praised Lewis' energetic singing technique and bravura, and believed Pages contained "strong songs rife with all sorts of compositional details worth discovering". Harrison applauded Lewis' observational songwriting, and the sociopolitical commentary in the songs "Peaches" and "Awake (Motu)" which he felt promoted unity among African diaspora. John Earls of Classic Pop magazine said Lewis thrived as soloist on an album that exuded confidence and eclecticism, calling it "12 further reminders of her varied skills within most forms of pop." The Observer's Tara Joshi wrote that although "a little clunky in places", the album is "a mostly sumptuous set of turn-of-the-millennium-style pop". Culture Fix shared the album as one of their best albums of 2024, describing its "stunning showcase of emotive songwriting, sumptuous vocals, and striking harmonies."

== Track listing ==
Pages track listing
No.	Title	Writer(s)	Producer(s)	Length
1.	"Missiles"	Shaznay Lewis; Ben Cullum; Plamen Vasilev; Moyses Dos Santos; Charlie Stacy	Cullum	3:55
2.	"Pick You Up" (featuring Self Esteem)	Lewis; Johan Hugo; Rebecca Lucy Taylor	Hugo	4:24
3.	"Kiss of Life"	Lewis; Emily Phillips; Anthony Whiting	Whiting	2:57
4.	"Good Mourning" (featuring Shola Ama and General Levy)	Lewis; Michael Angelo; Ben Cullum; Paul Levy; Lorne Alistair Tennant	Angelo	4:00
5.	"Supposed to Be"	Lewis; Jez Ashurst	Ashurst	4:04
6.	"Got to Let Go"	Lewis; Ashurst	Ashurst	3:58
7.	"Tears to the Floor"	Lewis; Cullum	Cullum	3:13
8.	"Bruises"	Lewis; Cullum	Cullum	4:48
9.	"Peaches"	Lewis; Whiting; Phillips	Whiting	3:30
10.	"Awake (Motu)"	Lewis; Hugo	Hugo	4:14
11.	"Miracle"	Lewis; Phillips; Whiting	Whiting	3:30
12.	"Hearts in Danger"	Lewis; Cullum; Rocky Morris; Rufio Sandilands	Cullum	4:12
Total length:				46:45

Deluxe edition bonus tracks
No.	Title	Writer(s)	Length
13.	"Never Ever" (Reimagined)	Lewis; Robert Jazayeri; Sean Mather	4:48
14.	"Pure Shores" (Reimagined)	Lewis; William Orbit	5:12
Total length:			56:05

== Charts ==
Chart performance for Pages
Chart (2024)	Peak position
Scottish Albums (OCC)	23
UK Album Downloads (OCC)	13
UK Independent Albums (OCC)	9

== Release history ==
Release history for Pages
Region	Date	Format(s)	Label(s)	Ref.
Various	17 May 2024	Cassette; CD; LP; digital download; streaming	1.9.7.5	
