= You (Shaznay Lewis song) =

Single by Shaznay Lewis

from the album Open
- Released: 18 October 2004
- Recorded: Chill Building, Santa Monica
- Length: 3:59 (album version); 3:36 (single mix)
- Label: London
- Songwriter(s): Shaznay Lewis; Rick Nowels
- Producer(s): Rick Nowels

Shaznay Lewis singles chronology
"Never Felt Like This Before" (2004)	"You" (2004)

"You" is a song by English singer Shaznay Lewis. Written by Lewis and Rick Nowels for her debut solo album Open (2004), it was released as the album's second and final single in 2004. The song peaked at number 56 on the UK Singles Chart.

== Music video ==
The music video for the song consists of Lewis walking on the beach on a full moon night thinking of her boyfriend. In the video, Lewis encounters several instances of her surroundings that contain elements of a face, including clouds and cliffs. The face is that of Lewis's husband, Christian Storm.

== Track listings ==
CD single 1
No.	Title	Writer(s)	Producer(s)	Length
1.	"You" (Single Mix)	Shaznay Lewis; Rick Nowels	Nowels	3:36
2.	"You" (Housebreakerz Version)	Lewis; Nowels	Nowels; Housebreakerz ^{[a]}	6:16

CD single 2
No.	Title	Writer(s)	Producer(s)	Length
1.	"You" (Single Mix)	Lewis; Nowels	Nowels	3:36
2.	"You" (Terror Danjah & DVA featuring Klashnekoff Remix)	Lewis; Nowels	Nowels; DVA^{[a]}; Terror Danjah^{[a]}	3:02
3.	"You" (Switch Remix)	Lewis; Nowels	Nowels; Switch^{[a]}	7:48
4.	"You" (Music video)			3:32

Notes

- ^{^[a]} denotes additional producer

== Personnel and credits ==
Credits adapted from the liner notes of Open.

- Rusty Anderson – electric guitar
- Curt Bisquera – drums
- Paul Bushnell – bass
- Nikki Harris – background vocals
- Charles Judge – keyboards, strings
- Greg Kurstin – keyboards, organ
- Shaznay Lewis – lyrics and music, vocals
- Rick Nowels – instruments, lyrics and music, producer
- Jofin Noyce – bass
- Wayne Rodriques – drum programmer
- Chris Tsangarides – keyboards

== Charts ==
Chart (2004)	Peak position
UK Singles (OCC)	56
