= War of Nerves (song) =

1998 single by All Saints

Single by All Saints

from the album All Saints
- B-side: "Inside"; "Always Something There to Remind Me"
- Released: 23 November 1998
- Recorded: 1997
- Length: 4:51
- Label: London
- Songwriters: Shaznay Lewis; Natalie Appleton; Nicole Appleton; Cameron McVey; Magnus Fiennes
- Producers: Cameron McVey; Magnus Fiennes

All Saints singles chronology
"Bootie Call" (1998)	"War of Nerves" (1998)	"Pure Shores" (2000)

Music video
- "War of Nerves" on YouTube

"War of Nerves" is a song by English girl group All Saints, released by London Records on 23 November 1998 as the fifth (sixth overall (Note: "Let's Get Started" was released as the second single in Japan only in November 1997.)) and final single from their debut album, All Saints. Group members Shaznay Lewis, Natalie Appleton and Nicole Appleton wrote the song with producers Cameron McVey and Magnus Fiennes. It is a ballad concerning mortality, inspired by the death of Diana, Princess of Wales. "War of Nerves" debuted at number seven on the UK Singles Chart, making it the group's fifth consecutive single to chart in the top 10.

== Background ==
"War of Nerves" was the last song recorded for the group's 1997 debut album, All Saints. The group wrote the song as a response to the death of Diana, Princess of Wales. In an interview for The Irish Times, group member Shaznay Lewis reflected, "I never really thought about things like my own death until it happened to Diana. And the song definitely did help me face those feelings." Natalie Appleton named it her favourite song on the album in the Appleton autobiography Together, saying, "the emotions are powerful and it gives me chills."

== Critical reception ==
In his review of All Saints for Rolling Stone, Chuck Eddy said the song "has an aptly unnerving prettiness". Sarah Davis of Dotmusic gave "War of Nerves" four out of five stars, writing, "A distinctly heart-felt ballad, it's more soulful than most of their previous releases, including 'Never Ever' and while at first appears to go nowhere, is an engaging listen." Conversely, Caitlin Moran of The Times believed "War of Nerves" proved that "Never Ever" was "a one-off, a glorious anomaly" and "the albatross around their necks". NME's Jim Firth derided it as "unfettered toss" and "a sawn-off version of the Lionel Richie song book", concluding, "No tune, no soul, no fun." Len Righi of The Morning Call wrote that All Saints seem "determined to embody monotony" on the track. In retrospective reviews, Jon O'Brien from AllMusic said "the gorgeous, sweeping strings of soulful ballad 'War of Nerves' have aged better than most of their contemporaries' output", while The Guardian's Caroline Sullivan found the song forgettable.

== Track listing ==
These are the formats and track listings of major single releases of "War of Nerves".

CD 1
1.	"War of Nerves" ('98 Remix)	4:52
2.	"Inside"	4:57
3.	"War of Nerves" (Ganja Kru Dub)	9:13
4.	"War of Nerves" (video)	5:11
CD 2
1.	"War of Nerves" ('98 Remix)	4:52
2.	"Always Something There to Remind Me" (live from the Burt Bacharach TV show)	3:20
3.	"Never Ever"	6:28
Cassette/Two track
1.	"War of Nerves" ('98 Remix)	4:52
2.	"Inside"	4:57

== Music video ==
The music video of "War of Nerves" is set in London's famous Met Bar in the Metropolitan Hotel. It also features a London bus with an advertisement for All Saints which was visible in London for quite a while. Member Melanie Blatt's pregnancy was also written in the concept for the video as she would be shown singing in the shower, exposing her belly in a silhouette. It also features a fight in a garage, between sisters Natalie and Nicole Appleton, they later comfort each other.

== Live performances ==
The song has been performed in a number of All Saints' concerts since their 2014 comeback. In the album version, lead vocals are shared by Shaznay Lewis and Melanie Blatt, however Natalie Appleton has taken over Lewis's lead vocals for all recent live performances. In the 2016 Red Flag tour, the song was combined with Red Flag single "This Is A War".

== Charts ==
=== Weekly charts ===
Chart (1998–1999)	Peak position
Belgium (Ultratip Bubbling Under Flanders)	13
European Hot 100 Singles (Music & Media)	36
Ireland (IRMA)	21
Netherlands (Dutch Top 40 Tipparade)	10
Netherlands (Single Top 100)	79
New Zealand (Recorded Music NZ)	50
Scotland Singles (OCC)	9
UK Singles (OCC)	7
UK Airplay (Music Week)	31

=== Year-end charts ===
Chart (1998)	Position
UK Singles (OCC)	116

== Certifications ==
Region	Certification	Certified units/sales
United Kingdom (BPI)	Silver	200,000^{^}
^{^} Shipments figures based on certification alone.
