= Open (Shaznay Lewis album) =

Studio album by Shaznay Lewis
- Released: 19 July 2004
- Genres: Pop; R&B
- Length: 40:42
- Label: London
- Producers: Kevin Bacon; Basement Jaxx; Karl "K-Gee" Gordon; Rick Nowels; Jonathan Quarmby; Wayne Rodiques

Shaznay Lewis chronology
Open (2004)	Pages (2024)

Singles from Open
- 1. "Never Felt Like This Before" Released: 5 July 2004; 2. "You" Released: 18 October 2004

Open is the debut solo studio album by the English singer Shaznay Lewis, released by London Records on 19 July 2004. It was preceded by the single "Never Felt Like This Before" which entered the UK Singles Chart at number eight. The album received mixed reviews from critics and peaked at number 22 on the UK Albums Chart.

== Critical reception ==
Professional ratings
Review scores
Source	Rating
Dotmusic	5/10
Evening Standard	3/5 stars
The Guardian	3/5 stars
The Independent	3/5 stars
The Observer	3/5 stars
Yahoo! Music UK	5/10

Open received mixed reviews from music critics upon release. Peter Robinson of The Observer believed the album had "a charm and warmth which always leads back to Lewis and her charismatic vocal style." Evening Standard critic John Aizlewood wrote that it was "hardly the work of a major talent", but "a pleasant, perfectly serviceable pop album". Andy Gill of The Independent called the album "a considered and assured work, even if there's not, ultimately, much greater depth to it." The Guardian's Alexis Petridis commented that "the second Open ends, most of it immediately vanishes from the memory, leaving virtually no trace." John Mulvey of Dotmusic described Open as "frustratingly ordinary" and "like a Beverley Knight album for aspiring Notting Hill residents".

== Track listing ==
Credits adapted from the liner notes of Open.

No.	Title	Writer(s)	Producer(s)	Length
1.	"Intro"/"Open"	Shaznay Lewis; Karl Gordon; Andy Watkins; Paul Wilson	Gordon	1:13
2.	"Dance"	Lewis; Rick Nowels; Wayne Rodiques	Nowels; Rodiques	3:29
3.	"Never Felt Like This Before"	Lewis; Nowels	Nowels	4:20
4.	"Mr. Dawg"	Buxton; Ratcliffe; Swaby	Basement Jaxx	3:43
5.	"Heart Made Me a Fool"	Lewis; Bob Marley	Karl Gordon	4:30
6.	"You"	Lewis; Nowels	Nowels	3:59
7.	"Mr. Weatherman"	Lewis; Watkins; Wilson	Kevin Bacon; Jonathan Quarmby	4:23
8.	"Butterflies"	Lewis; Gordon; Jofin Hamilton	Gordon	3:36
9.	"Nasty Boy"	Lewis; Gordon; Felix Howard	Gordon	4:47
10.	"Radio"	Lewis; Sigvardt; Bafincke; Tiomborg	Bacon; Quarmby	2:51
11.	"Now You're Gone"	Lewis; Nowels	Bacon; Quarmby	3:43

== Charts ==
Chart performance for Open
Chart (2004)	Peak position
Scottish Albums (Official Charts)	23
UK Albums (Official Charts)	22
UK R&B Albums (Official Charts)	12
