= I Wanna Be Your Lady =

Single by Hinda Hicks featuring Shaznay Lewis

from the album Hinda
- Released: 13 December 1997
- Recorded: Island Def Jam
- Genre: Electronic
- Length: 4:32
- Songwriters: Michelle Escoffery; Sikiru Lah Olatunji Oluwa
- Producer: Jazz Black

Hinda Hicks featuring Shaznay Lewis singles chronology
"I Wanna Be Your Lady" (1997)	"If You Want Me / When You Touch Me There" (1998)

Shaznay Lewis singles chronology
"I Wanna Be Your Lady" (1997)	"Dream the Dream" (2003)

"I Wanna Be Your Lady" was the first single released from the Hinda album of Hinda Hicks and features Shaznay Lewis on vocals. It charted at 109 and peaked on #14 on the UK Singles Chart.

== Track listing ==
#	Title	Length
1.	"I Wanna Be Your Lady"	4:32
2.	"I Wanna Be Your Lady" (Curtis & Moore's Weston Village Vocal Mix)	6:44
3.	"I Wanna Be Your Lady" (Curtis & Moore's Weston Village Vocal Dub)	6:06
