= G:MT – Greenwich Mean Time =

1999 British drama film

- Promotional poster
- Directed by: John Strickland
- Written by: Simon Mirren
- Produced by: Taylor Hackford
- Starring: Alec Newman; Chiwetel Ejiofor; Ben Waters; Steve John Shepherd
- Cinematography: Alan Almond
- Edited by: Patrick Moore
- Music by: Guy Sigsworth
- Distributed by: Icon Film Distribution (UK)
- Release date: 1 October 1999
- Running time: 117 minutes
- Country: United Kingdom
- Language: English
- Budget: £1 Million

G:MT – Greenwich Mean Time is a 1999 British coming-of-age, drama film.

Starring Chiwetel Ejiofor, Alec Newman, Steve John Shepherd and Ben Waters who are the four men on the poster, the film is set at the edge of the millennium and centred around four friends in their early 20s living in Greenwich. While each are trying to pursue their careers and goals, they are faced with life altering experiences of adulthood, developing and failing relationships and tragedy. The film takes its name from the central location where it’s based, the local mean time at the location’s royal observatory, coining the phrase 'Time Starts Here', and the name of the electro band which is a centrepiece of the story.

Although an experienced director in television, this was John Strickland's first full length feature film. The film features music by electro, R&B, acid jazz and jungle artists including Talvin Singh, Hinda Hicks, Tricky and Imogen Heap. It was also one of the final projects of jazz trumpeter Lester Bowie.

== Plot ==
In 1995, after a final day of school, six friends, thrill seeker Charlie (Alec Newman), his affectionate excitable girlfriend Lucy (Melanie Gutteridge), empathetic and well built Rix (Chiwetel Ejiofor), his considerate yet energetic girlfriend Sherry (Anjela Lauren Smith), cheeky and humorously social Sam (Steve John Shepherd) and shy introvertly down-to-earth Bean (Ben Waters) are all hanging out in Greenwich Park sharing a spliff. There they happen upon former classmate, Bobby (Alicya Eyo) who is playing guitar with two of her friends. Sherry encourages a reluctant Bean to go over and talk to her. Sam distrubtes this conversation. While having a water fight, Bean enviously looks on as Bobby and Sam start flirting with each other. All seven friends then make a plan to 'take on the world with their art' together, while standing on the high point of the park facing the Isle Of Dogs. Bean takes out his trumpet and blows a victory melody.

Four years later in 1999, in Sam's garage, the friends have formed a band with Bean on trumpet, Rix on beats and keyboards and Bobby on the bass guitar and Sam as the manager. Charlie returns, telling them he's given a new job .

Bean seeks temporary refuge at Charlies, after being kicked out of the flat by his abusive father. Later that evening, the group go to a function at Cutty Sark where Sam tries to promote the band to fellow music entrepreneur Ant (Perry Fenwick) but he is rejected. Bean encounters a young woman named Rachel (Georgia Mackenzie), who is a colleague of Bobby’s from the bank. She ends up coming back with him to Sam’s house. Just as Rix is confiding in Sam about how he's considering leaving her, Sherry confides in Bobby that she is pregnant with Rix's baby.

Next morning, Sherry tells Rix about her pregnancy and he completely freaks out, he tells Sherry that he’s determined they’re not going to keep the baby. Sherry, however angrily tells him that it’s her body and her decision. While Charlie and Lucy are having sex, she pleads Charlie to cum inside her. Charlie freaks out, angrily insisting that he wants a career, not a baby. When he calms down, he asks what is troubling Lucy. She shares her worry that Charlie’s success will cause a distance between them. Charlie reassures Lucy this is not the case.

Bean and Rachel talk about different places they would love to travel including Waterville, a seaside town in Ireland. Rachel suggests they go together. To show Rachel how much he likes her, during band rehearsal Bean and the rest of the group play a tune that he wrote that morning for her. That day Charlie is on his way back from the first day of the job, however he suddenly loses control of his motor and has a severe collision with much larger vehicle. The accident leaves Charlie in a coma and paralysed from the waist down. When all his friends arrive at the hospital, Sam becomes overridden with anxiety and grief due to memories of his father dying prior. Determined to push the band forward to success, he goes to the office of his uncle Henry (Alun Armstrong). He tells Sam that if they wish to be a success, they should find a vocalist for the group. On the way back from the hospital, Bean sees Rachel in a car with another man beside her, Bean believes wrongly that Rachel is kissing the man and runs away feeling devastated. Rix while walking on Blackheath, notices a father and son spending time together flying a kite. He tells Sherry that he's had a change of heart about the baby.

When all the friends are back at Sam’s, they all fret over Charlie's health until Sam decides to tell them what his uncle Henry told him about the band being granted studio time and brings up the idea of getting a vocalist. Bean and Rix are opposed to the idea. After Sam belittles Bean’s feelings regarding Rachel, Bean tells Sam that he's a ‘no talent cunt’. Sam loses his temper and physically throws Bean out of his house. Despite Rix and Bobby pleading for Bean to stay, Bean humiliated asserts he wants nothing to do with any of them anymore before abandoning and cutting ties with all his former friends.

Bean then goes back to his home area at the Ferrier Estate in Kidbrooke where he meets an old schoolmate now-drug dealer Elroy (Freddie Annobil-Dodoo). Seeing an opportunity to make money, Bean decides to accept Elroy’s offer of working for him. In the studio, Rix and Bobby are beginning to work on recording new tracks with a vocalist named Iona (Hinda Hicks). Rix is annoyed over Iona's induction while Bobby is not happy with her and Sam's flirtatious interactions.

The group try to reconnect with Bean but are rejected. Bean sinks deeper into the drugs trade, develops a habit and meets the main supplier, Ricky (Robbie Gee). Elroy, who frequently gets high off his own supply is worried about being found short, so he plans to shift the blame on Bean to avoid punishment and gain more favour.

Sam and Bobby soon break up and she leaves the group. After a day in the studio, on his way home he encounters Rachel being harassed by the same man from the car. He runs over to defend her from him. Rachel recognises Sam as Bean’s friend and says that she hasn't seen or heard from him since that day. Sam tells her a one-sided story of their fight and how he tried to call Bean. After realising they have a lot in common, they share a kiss on the south bank.

Back in the studio, Iona and Rix are developing a new track. Sam, impressed says this could be the single they are looking for. Rix finds a recording from Bean on his trumpet, which is later added to this single. After being reminded of Bean, he goes to see him and tries to persuade Bean to come back and see his friends. Bean forces him out of his flat, telling him not to come back.

At the album launch party, Rix sees Sam and Rachel together and is disappointed. When Sam informs Rix of their record deal, he barely acknowledges. When Sam becomes irritated by this, Rix confronts Sam that he never called Bean and calls out Sam’s hypocrisy. Rachel is upset that Sam lied to her about Bean and breaks up with him.

One day, Lucy visits the hospital to see a depressed Charlie, but stops when she witnesses him fantasise about football with another disabled patient called Mick (Joe Duttine), Lucy, overwhelmed with emotion, breaks down in tears and runs away from the hospital and that’s the last anyone sees of her. Charlie and Mick start to bond over their shared injury. However, Charlie soon finds out that Mick has ended his own life. Tearfully he tells Rix what had happened and worries about his future. Rix suddenly takes him outside for the first time since his accident and vows to always be there for him. Sam visits Charlie and apologises for not visiting. Rix and Sam take Charlie to the south band where they gift Charlie with a camera.

Elroy’s plan to frame Bean is coming to fruition. Ricky tells him to bring Bean to see him to be dealt with. On exactly the same night, the band decided to name themselves 'Greenwich Mean Time' after the town they group up in together, have their first ever gig which is also the launch of their first release. Bobby arrives with a new boyfriend to watch the show. Sam is initially taken aback but remains civil. When he sees Rachel he tries to talk to her properly, but she reiterates that she doesn’t want to hear it. Bean goes to tell Charlie how he's messed things up. After Charlie contradicts him, Bean says he just wish he could make everything right with everyone, especially Rachel, to which Charlie replies for him to just do it. When Sam calls out for Charlie, Bean legs it. The gig then starts with Rix, Iona and electro artist Talvin Singh joining them.

Elroy picks up Bean taking them to meet Ricky. When they arrive, Ricky implies that he ‘knows’ Bean has been stealing from him. Bean figures out that Elroy has framed him. Immediately after Ricky tells his bodyguard to shoot him in the kneecap, Bean subdues the bodyguard, killing the other bodyguard and Ricky before they can intervene. Before he fatally stabs the initial bodyguard. Bean then turns to Elroy, steps closer to him and points the gun at his face. Ignoring Elroy’s pleas of mercy, Bean pulls the trigger, killing him. He then takes all of the money out of the safe, puts it in a rucksack with the gun and walks out of the office.

The next morning Bean turns up at Rachel’s work to see her. Bean tells a shocked Rachel that he has a bag stuffed full of cash and that they could go his favourite place Ireland, like they had spoken about before. Rachel is stunned, not knowing how to respond. Sam shows up wanting to speak to Rachel not recognising Bean. Sam tries to lead Bean outside to talk, after being asked to leave by the bank manager but Bean responds by pulling out the gun from his bag, causing instant panic and everyone in the bank to run out, apart from Sam & Rachel. Before Sam can explain anything, Bean smashes the butt of the gun on his face and asks if he slept with Rachel, to which he replies he did. He then turns to Rachel and asks her about the man in the car, to which she immediately tries to explain that it was not what Bean thought it was. At this point the police have surrounded the bank. Bean considers shooting a terrified and regretful Sam before concluding that their friends, particularly Charlie, need him. Deciding then and there that he would rather die than go to prison, he begins to walk outside with the gun in his hand. When Rachel and Sam beg him not to, he turns to them, smiles and quotes Sam’s favourite movie, Blade Runner then proceeds to walk outside. Despite the police warning that they’ll open fire if he does not drop the weapon, Bean raises the gun, a smile still on his face and is shot dead.

Some time later, Sam, Charlie, Rachel along with Rix & Sherry and their newborn baby are all on an empty beach. Charlie takes the lid off what appears to be a silver container of ashes. He then exclaims ‘there you go geezer, finally made it to Ireland’.

== Cast ==
- Alec Newman as Charlie
- Chiwetel Ejiofor as Rix
- Ben Waters (Credited as Benjamin Waters) as Bean
- Steve John Shepherd as Sam
- Alicya Eyo as Bobby
- Anjela Lauren Smith as Sherry
- Melanie Gutteridge as Lucy
- Georgia Mackenzie as Rachel
- Hinda Hicks as Iona
- Alun Armstrong as Uncle Henry
- Joe Duttine as Mick
- Freddie Annobil-Dodoo as Elroy
- Robbie Gee as Ricky
- Perry Fenwick as Ant
- John Blundell as Brian
- Ray Stevenson as Mr Hardy
- Paul Ritter as Drug Buyer

Simon Mirren has a small cameo in the movie as a drug dealer and Talvin Singh also appears as himself during the performance sequence

== Soundtrack ==
G:MT — Greenwich Mean Time (Music From The Film

Soundtrack album by Various Artists
- Released: 01 October 1999
- Genres: Electro, Drum & Bass, Trip Hop
- Length: 47:23
- Label: Island Records

1. “Meantime” - GMT & Imogen Heap
2. “Dialogue” - Cast
3. “Christiansands” - Tricky
4. “Tears Are Waiting” - GMT, Hinda Hicks & Lester Bowie
5. “Sincere” - MJ Cole
6. “Where Is The Love” - GMT & Hinda Hicks
7. “Dialogue” - Cast
8. “Vikram The Vampire” - Talvin Singh
9. “All I Wanna Do” - Dfferent Levels
10. “Please Can I Go Now?” - GMT & Hinda Hicks
11. “Who Would You Have Me Love?” - GMT & Hinda Hicks
12. “Succumb To You” - GMT & Hinda Hicks
13. “Dialogue” - Cast
14. “Baptism” - Roots Manuva
15. “Rachel’s Song” - GMT & Lester Bowie

== Reception ==
The film was not well received by critics upon release, with writer Mirren suggesting some of the response was directed at the fact he is Helen Mirren's nephew (and the producer Taylor Hackford was Helen Mirren's partner), and therefor perceived as a nepotist being given a "helping hand" as a result. The movie holds an approval rating of 70% on Rotten Tomatoes.

A limited UK release in the cinema then to VHS meant that the film did better business elsewhere, but it was only released on DVD in the United States, the Netherlands and Germany. The movie was given a certificate 18 rating by the BBFC in the UK and an R rating by the MPA in the US.
