= Bounce to This =

Studio album by K-Gee
- Released: October 7, 2002
- Recorded: 2000–2001
- Genre: Hip hop, electronic
- Length: 67:06
- Label: Instant Karma
- Producer: K-Gee

Bounce to This is an album by Karl Gordon, also known as K-Gee. The album had one minor hit with "I Don't Really Care" which peaked at No. 22 on the UK Singles Chart two years prior to the album's release, but received more publicity for the song "Let's Get Nice" which he recorded with Melanie Blatt while they were both stoned about the joys of marijuana.

== Track listing ==
#	Title	Length
1.	"Stuck in the Middle"	4:48
2.	"Hit the Floor"	4:38
3.	"Stay True"	5:03
4.	"I Don't Really Care"	5:52
5.	"If You Leave Me Now"	4:22
6.	"Ain't Trying to Hear"	4:10
7.	"Stuck in Yo' Head" featuring Shaznay Lewis	4:04
8.	"Bounce to This"	5:21
9.	"Gettin' It On"	5:11
10.	"K.M.F.O! (Knocking Motherfuckers Out!)"	4:51
11.	"Worldwide"	4:27
12.	"Upside Down"	4:27
13.	"We Have It Like That"	4:50
14.	"Let's Get Nice" featuring Melanie Blatt	5:00
