= I Don't Really Care (K-Gee song) =

Single by K-Gee

from the album Bounce to This
- Released: 2000
- Genre: Miami bass; hip hop
- Label: Instant Karma
- Producers: Karl "K-Gee" Gordon, Steve Octave

K-Gee singles chronology
"I Don't Really Care" (2000)	"Stay True" (2001)

"I Don't Really Care" is the debut single by English rapper/record producer K-Gee, released in 2000. It was produced by K-Gee and Octave, and features vocals by singer Michelle Escoffery. The song reached number 22 on the UK Singles Chart in October 2000. It was included two years later on his debut studio album, Bounce to This.

Writing for the September 30, 2000 issue of Billboard, Kwaku said of the song: "'I Don't Really Care' uses a most unusual combination of influences: Miami bass rhythms, Vivaldi's Four Seasons string arrangements, and Beach Boys-hued stacked vocals, which contrast with K-Gee's rapping and singing." K-Gee himself said "I've got different things flying in my head at any one time. I was mixing it at one time, and as soon as I heard the strings, I could hear the Miami bass underneath it."

== Track listings ==
UK CD single

1. "I Don't Really Care" (7" radio edit) – 3:19
2. "I Don't Really Care" (Big Booty mix) – 5:55
3. "I Don't Really Care" (7" video edit) – 3:14

UK 12" single
A1. "I Don't Really Care" (Big Booty mix) – 4:44
A2. "I Don't Really Care" (Big Booty mix instrumental) – 4:44
B1. "I Don't Really Care" (Noodles remix) – 5:20
B2. "I Don't Really Care" (Latino mix) – 4:35

== Charts ==
Chart (2000)	Peak position
UK Singles (OCC)	22
UK Dance Singles (OCC)	38
