= Instant Karma (record label) =

Independent record label

Instant Karma is an independent record label created by former Warner Music Group chairman and head of the BPI, Rob Dickins, in 1999. The label was founded by Dickins after his resignation from Warner Music, where he gained fame for his track record of signing female vocalists such as Enya and the Corrs. Instant Karma's first release was Helicopter Girl's How to Steal the World album in June 2000; the label received attention for the fact that its very first release was short-listed for the Mercury Prize. Helicopter Girl signed with Instant Karma on the condition that she be permitted not to tour.

Dickins noted that he was pleased to have How to Steal the World as the label's "calling card", but that he planned other releases to have more immediate commercial appeal.

The label was funded by Sony Music UK. British DJ/producer K-Gee's first solo single and album were released on Instant Karma in October 2000 and October 2002, respectively.

== Acts ==
- Addis Black Widow
- The Alice Band
- Bleached Bones
- Blossomer
- Derek Jarman
- Donna McKevitt
- Eberg
- Fuzz Light Years
- Ghostland
- Helicopter Girl
- I Monster
- Jaed
- Jonatha Brooke
- K-Gee
- The Kennedy Soundtrack
- Lorien
- Louie Austen
- Panjabi MC
- The Past Present Organisation
- WigWam

== See also ==
- List of record labels
