= Kirsty Bertarelli =

British songwriter and beauty pageant winner

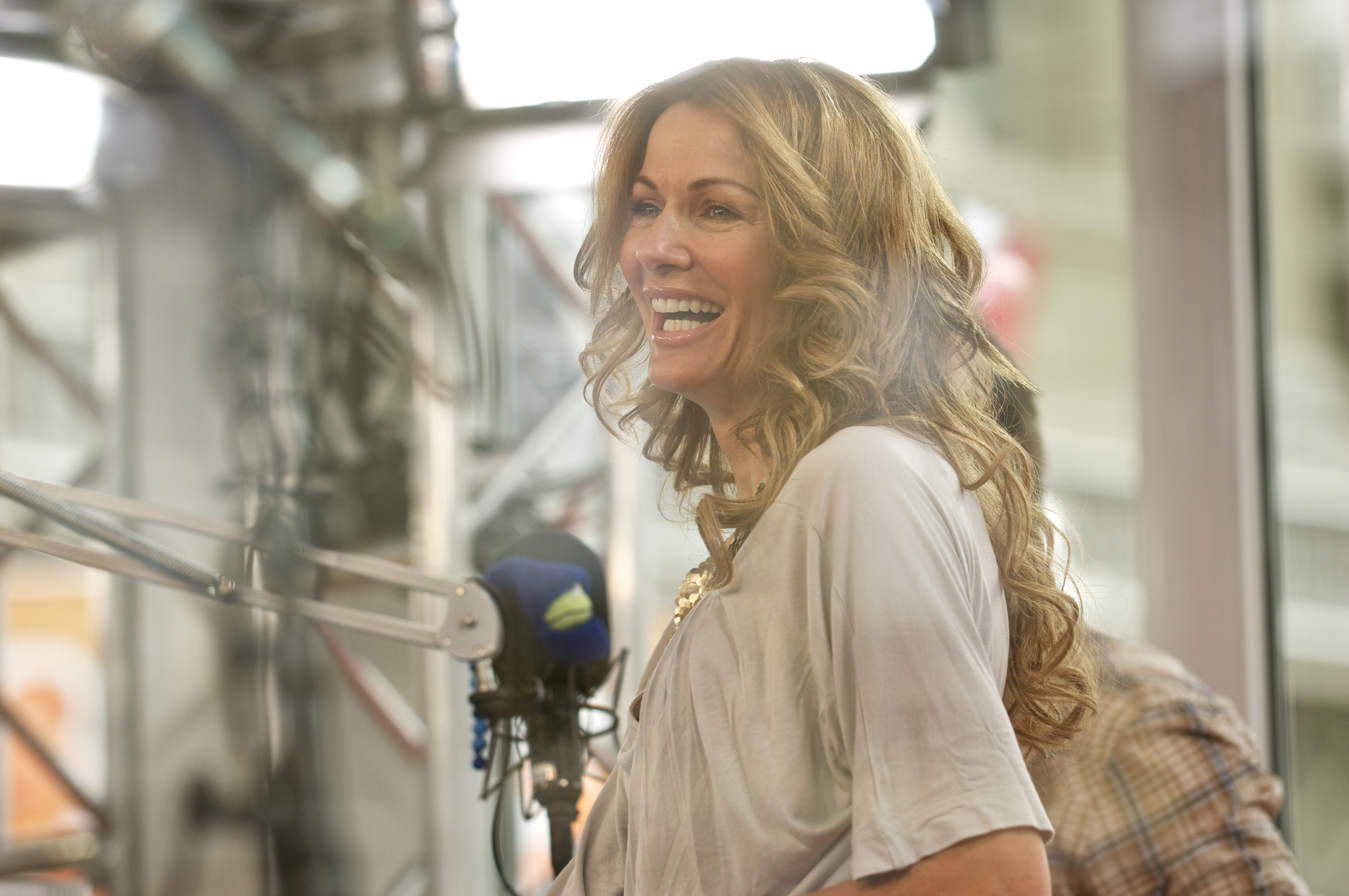
- Kirsty Bertarelli on 14 December 2010
- Born: Kirsty Roper; 30 June 1971 (age 55); Staffordshire, England
- Occupations: Songwriter, singer
- Known for: Miss United Kingdom, 1988 "Black Coffee" (All Saints song)
- Spouse: Ernesto Bertarelli (m. 2000; div. 2021)
- Website: Bertarelli's music website

Kirsty Bertarelli (née Roper; born 30 June 1971) is a British songwriter and beauty pageant titleholder. She won Miss United Kingdom 1988 and represented her country at Miss World 1988, placing as second runner-up. She is the former wife of Ernesto Bertarelli.

In the Sunday Times Rich List 2017 ranking of the wealthiest people in the UK, her former husband's family were placed 6th with an estimated fortune of £11.5bn, making her Britain's richest woman.

== Early life and career ==
Born in the United Kingdom on 30 June 1971, Kirsty spent her childhood in Stone in Staffordshire. Her family formerly owned one of the world's major manufacturers of ceramic products, Churchill China.

She was crowned Miss UK in 1988, giving her the right to compete in the 1988 Miss World pageant where she placed 2nd runner-up. After moving to London, she began to write music professionally and was signed on to Warner Records.

Kirsty was married to "biotechnology tycoon" Ernesto Bertarelli in 2000. The couple and their children lived on Lake Geneva in Switzerland. Kirsty and Ernesto divorced in the summer of 2021, making her one of richest "divorced" women of the UK, with a total estimated worth of more than £400 million. She is a trustee of The Bertarelli Foundation, which works primarily in neuroscience research and marine conservation and science. Recent projects have included the sponsorship of the neuroscience research at the Centre for Neuroprosthetics at the Swiss Federal Institute of Technology in Lausanne and also a joint programme between that university and Harvard Medical School. In marine conservation and marine science, the Foundation has supported the creation of a number of marine reserves, including in the British Indian Ocean Territory, Easter Island and the Turneffe Atoll in Belize. Kirsty Bertarelli lead the family's Foundation's community work in Stoke-on-Trent, the city close to where she grew up. This includes a bursary scheme worth £4,500 for disadvantaged student at Staffordshire University, a partnership with the city's YMCA, and support for the annual Stoke-on-Trent Literary Festival.

== Music career ==
In 2000, she co-wrote "Black Coffee". The song was recorded by All Saints and became a worldwide hit. It was number one in the UK chart, reached the Top 10 in seven other countries and featured in various international charts for 20 weeks.

Always interested and involved in music, Bertarelli has continued to write songs. She recorded some of her songs for the UK-Swiss charity Smiling Children Foundation and Le Matin described her as having a "golden voice".

Universal Music liked the songs and decided to sign her. The first single, "Don't Say", was released digitally through online stores on 9 December 2009. Her debut album Elusive was published on 15 January 2010, entering the Swiss charts in the 20th position.

Throughout 2010, Bertarelli published two more singles in Switzerland ("Elusive" and "More Than Anything"). She also had several live performances, including the Montreux Jazz Festival and opening acts for Simply Red in Edinburgh and Zürich.

In 2011, a remix of her conservation song "Green" was chosen by the WWF to be their anthem to mark the Fund's 50th year of conservation at their annual Panda Ball. Bertarelli donated all proceeds from the single to WWF to support their ongoing conservation projects around the world.

The song is included in the acoustic album Green, first released as an iTunes digital download in February 2012. Proceeds from the album are also being donated to the WWF, as part of her continuing support for the organization.

2011 saw the release of her single "Set Your Body Free", which included remixes from Loverush UK!, Jason van Wyk, Full Intention and Nova.

In January 2012, Bertarelli signed a long-term exclusive music deal with Sony/ATV Music publishing and collaborated with world-renowned trance DJ Armin van Buuren. Van Buuren's remix of Kirsty's song "Twilight" was in dance charts for 9 weeks, peaking at No. 2 on Music Week's club chart. This collaboration has continued, with van Buuren producing Kirsty's new single "Free of War".

Bertarelli then released her next album titled Love Is, which was partly recorded in Nashville, Tennessee. Her latest album, called Indigo Shores, was released on 12 May 2014 following her signing by Decca Records in the autumn of 2013.
