= I Know Where It's At =

1997 single by All Saints

Single by All Saints

from the album All Saints
- B-side: "Alone"
- Released: 25 August 1997
- Studio: Metropolis (London)
- Genre: R&B; pop
- Length: 4:00
- Label: London
- Songwriters: Shaznay Lewis; Karl Gordon; Walter Becker; Donald Fagen; Paul Griffin
- Producers: Karl Gordon; Cameron McVey; Magnus Fiennes

All Saints singles chronology
"Silver Shadow" (1994)	"I Know Where It's At" (1997)	"Never Ever" (1997)

Music video
- "I Know Where It's At" on YouTube

"I Know Where It's At" is a song by English girl group All Saints, released in August 1997 as their debut single from their first album, All Saints (1997). The song became the group's first top-10 hit, peaking at number four on the UK Singles Chart. In the United States, the single reached number 36 on the Billboard Hot 100. The song additionally entered the top 20 in Australia, Canada, France, Ireland and New Zealand.

== Background ==
"I Know Where It's At" was written by Shaznay Lewis and Karl Gordon, and produced by Gordon. Walter Becker and Donald Fagen are credited as writers because the song samples elements from Steely Dan's "The Fez".

== Critical reception ==
The song received positive reviews from music critics. Stephen Thomas Erlewine from AllMusic picked it as one of the "standouts" from All Saints, describing it as "party-ready" and "Steely Dan-fueled". Pan-European magazine Music & Media wrote, "This all-female quartet has taken the UK by storm recently, prompting inevitable comparisons with the Spice Girls in the press. That doesn't really do them full justice—the song itself is actually very well written and the distinctive razorsharp vocal harmonies are the icing on the cake."

A reviewer from Music Week gave "I Know Where It's At" five out of five and named it Single of the Week, adding, "The London-based four-piece girl group's label debut is virtually all strong chorus and instant rhythm. Could be a smart move, so watch this one with care." Paul Martin from The News Letter stated, "The groovy party theme is just the tonic for any winter blues. Nicole and Melanie take lead vocals and the brilliant harmonies of Natalie and Shaznay dress the song in a superb gloss." He concluded, "Undoubtedly the most impressive track on the collection." Rob Brunner from Entertainment Weekly felt that "their upbeat ditties", like "I Know Where It's At", "are their best, but even those tracks cook over a low-to-medium flame."

== Music video ==
The accompanying music video for "I Know Where It's At" was directed by Alex Hemming. It was the first video All Saints ever released. It was to show the girls in an urban setting as the more streetwise variants of girl groups. The video was shot with very little colour, with the girls almost entirely in black and white.

== Track listings ==
- UK CD1; Canadian and Australian CD single
1. "I Know Where It's At" (Cutfather and Jo's alternative mix – radio)
2. "I Know Where It's At" (original radio mix)
3. "I Know Where It's At" (Cutfather and Jo's alternative mix)
4. "I Know Where It's At" (original mix)
- UK CD2
1. "I Know Where It's At" (K-Gee's Bounce mix)
2. "I Know Where It's At" (Nu Birth Riddum dub)
3. "I Know Where It's At" (Colour System Inc. Vox)
4. "Alone" – 3:31
- UK cassette single
1. "I Know Where It's At" (Cutfather and Jo's alternative mix)
2. "I Know Where It's At" (original mix)
- US CD, 7-inch, and cassette single
1. "I Know Where It's At" (Cutfather and Jo's alternative mix – radio) – 4:01
2. "I Know Where It's At" (original radio mix) – 4:00
- Australian CD single re-release
1. "I Know Where It's At" (original mix)
2. "I Know Where It's At" (original radio mix)
3. "I Know Where It's At" (Nu Birth Riddum dub)
4. "Never Ever" (Booker T's vocal mix)
5. "Alone"
- Japanese CD single
1. "I Know Where It's At" (Cutfather and Jo's alternative mix – radio)
2. "I Know Where It's At" (Cutfather and Jo's alternative mix)
3. "I Know Where It's At" (original mix)
4. "Alone"

== Charts ==
=== Weekly charts ===
Chart (1997–1998)	Peak position
Australia (ARIA)	12
Belgium (Ultratop 50 Flanders)	37
Canada (Nielsen SoundScan)	2
Canada Top Singles (RPM)	7
Canada Dance/Urban (RPM)	1
Estonia Airplay (Eesti Top 25)	22
Europe (Eurochart Hot 100)	37
France (SNEP)	20
Germany (GfK)	71
Iceland (Íslenski Listinn Topp 40)	23
Ireland (IRMA)	19
Israel (IBA)	16
Netherlands (Dutch Top 40)	33
Netherlands (Single Top 100)	52
New Zealand (Recorded Music NZ)	8
Scottish Singles Sales (Official Charts)	9
Sweden (Sverigetopplistan)	37
Switzerland (Schweizer Hitparade)	25
UK Singles (Official Charts)	4
UK Airplay (Music Week)	16
US Billboard Hot 100	36
US Mainstream Top 40 (Billboard)	21
US Rhythmic Top 40 (Billboard)	28

=== Year-end charts ===
Chart (1997)	Position
Romania (Romanian Top 100)	94
UK Singles (OCC)	83

Chart (1998)	Position
Australia (ARIA)	85
Canada Dance (RPM)	33

== Certifications ==
Region	Certification	Certified units/sales
Australia (ARIA)	Gold	35,000^{^}
United Kingdom (BPI)	Silver	200,000^{‡}
^{^} Shipments figures based on certification alone.^{‡} Sales+streaming figures based on certification alone.

== Release history ==
Region	Date	Format(s)	Label(s)	Ref.
Japan	25 August 1997	CD	London	
United Kingdom	25 August 1997	CD; cassette	London	
United States	12 January 1998	Radio	London	
