= Hinda Hicks =

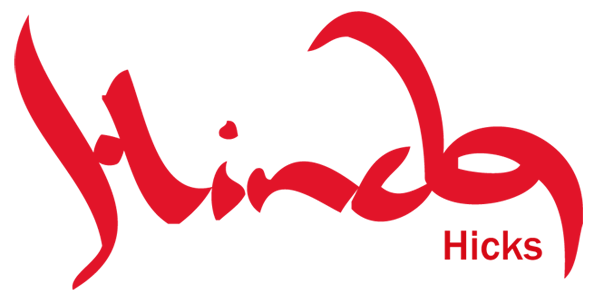

Background information
- Origin: Tunisia
- Genres: Pop, R&B
- Years active: 1997–present
- Label: Island Records

Hinda Hicks (born 1976) is a British and Tunisian-born singer, actress and artist who first gained notability with her musical career in the late '90s and is best known for her debut album Hinda.

After supporting Boyzone and 911 in the late 1990s, Hicks found success with three singles, which all reached the Top 40. This was followed by her debut album Hinda, which charted at #20 on the 1998 UK Top 40 Chart, and led to three nominations in the MOBO Awards and nominations for Best British Female Artist and Best British Newcomer at the 1999 Brit Awards. Later in the year, Hicks had a fourth Top 40 single. After the 1999 Brit Awards, Hicks spent the next year recording her second album Everything to Me. She featured on Lynden David Hall's "Let's Do It Again" and Terri Walker's "Brand New Day". In 2004, Hicks released her third album, Still Doin' My Thing, including the single "Up Up", but she was unable to repeat her earlier success.

== Introduction ==
Hicks was born in Tunisia but was raised in West Sussex, where she soon emerged as "one of the U.K.'s most promising talents". Before her musical career, she had a passion for basketball, which resulted in a coaching qualification, as well as a United States scholarship. However, her sights set on music after her friend overheard her singing along to an Aretha Franklin track, thus encouraging her to sing.

Artists like Ella Fitzgerald and Nina Simone helped to shape the roots of Hicks' musical career, which she later describes in an interview with Ras Kwame as "the balance between my love of hip hop, my love of jazz, my love of soul". She began to sing with an R&B group called the Fabulous Fug Band and, at one time, sent a demo of her own vocals alongside Aretha Franklin's "Something He Can Feel" to Phil Collins. However, she continued to remain unsigned and moved to London, where she worked as a secretary and joined the band Mixed Fruits.

== Early success ==
Hicks was introduced to On Point Productions, the team comprising Jazz Black (music producer) and Dele Rotimi (music manager), which put her on the radar for multiple record companies. In 1997, she signed a five-album deal with Island Records. However, her first single "I Wanna Be Your Lady" did not make the UK Singles Chart.

After performing "high-profile support slots" with Irish boyband Boyzone and English group 911, Hicks' next three singles all reached the Top 40. "If You Want Me" reached #25, "You Think You Own Me" ranked #19, and a re-release of "I Wanna Be Your Lady" topped #14 on the charts.

After Hick's debut album Hinda charted at #20, Hick's received 3 nominations at the 1998 MOBO Awards and also nominations for Best British Female and Best British Newcomer at the 1999 Brit Awards. Later in the year, Hicks fourth Top 40 single "Truly" reached #31 on the charts.

== Second album ==
After the 1999 Brit Awards, Hicks spent the next year recording her second album Everything to Me. She had split from her management and production team that discovered her - On Point Productions. However, due to the Island Records and Universal Records merger and a lack of promotion, her single "My Remedy" was unable to make the UK Top 40. While Hicks' second album received limited release, the launch was aborted commercially and she and Island Records parted ways in 2000.

In between record companies and albums, Hicks recorded vocals on other artists' tracks and musical projects. This included "Let's Do It Again" with the late Lynden David Hall, which featured on his album The Other Side, as well as the compilation album Pure R&B Volume 2. Hicks was also featured in "Brand New Day" from Terri Walker's debut album Untitled, which released on 3 March 2003 with Mercury Records.

== Third album and the future ==
Hicks returned to music production in 2004, with the release of her third album Still Doin' My Thing under the R&B label Shout Out Records. The single "Up Up" was released in the summer of 2004, but she was unable to repeat her earlier success of making the UK Top 40 Chart.

In February 2007, Hicks' MySpace page announced that a fourth album would be released in 2010, however the album was shelved as Hicks focused on other roles. As of November 2008, Hicks was listed as part of a London-based artistic and music collective created by the DJ and producer Yvan Serrano DJ Healer Selecta/Dustaphonics and called Raison d'Etre.

== Critical acclaim ==
In October 1998, Hicks was nominated for three MOBO awards: Best R'n'B Act, Best Newcomer and Best Album. She also appeared on a MOBO Allstars charity single called "Aint No Stopping Us Now". In early 1999, Hicks was nominated at the BRIT Awards in the categories of 'Best Newcomer' and 'Best British Female Artist'.

== Other work ==
=== Film ===
- Hicks has appeared in two British film productions: G:MT - Greenwich Mean Time in 1999 (for which she performed several of the songs on the official soundtrack) and Circus in 2000.
- Hicks took an uncredited role in a well-received US film Love & Basketball in 2000 and wrote the song "Our Destiny" that appeared in the movie but was not featured on the soundtrack. The track did, however, feature on the Everything to Me album, which was not released in the UK.

== Discography ==
=== Singles ===
- "I Wanna Be Your Lady" (Island Records) (13 December 1997) – UK No. 14
- "If You Want Me" / "When You Touch Me There" (Island Records) (7 March 1998) – UK No. 25
- "You Think You Own Me" (Island Records) (16 May 1998) – UK No. 19
- "Truly" (Island Records) (24 October 1998) – UK No. 31
- "Ain't No Stoppin' Us Now" single with the MOBO Allstars (Polygram) (11 December 1998) – UK No. 47
- "Let's Do It Again" single with Lynden David Hall, (11 September 2000) – UK No. 69
- "My Remedy" (Universal/Island Records) (14 October 2000) – UK No. 61
- "Up Up" (Shout Out Records) (17 July 2004) – UK No. 99
- "Love It* (2010) (Unreleased)
- "Our Destiny" (Love & Basketball Soundtrack)

=== Albums ===
- Hinda (Island Records) (29 August 1998) – UK No. 20
- Everything to Me (Island/Universal Records) (10 October 2000) – Limited release
- Still Doin' My Thing (Shout Out Records) (19 July 2004)
- Journey's (2010/2011) (Unreleased)

==== Music videos ====
- "If You Want Me" Directed by Dani Jacobs
- "You Think You Own Me" Directed by Dani Jacobs
- "I Wanna Be Your Lady"
- "Truly"
- "My Remedy"
- "Up Up"
- "Love It"

=== Other appearances ===
- "If You Want Me" on the album, Street Jams 1998, by various artists (Telstar) (11 May 1998)
- "If You Want Me" on the album, Music in Motion II, by various artists (Stichting CPG (Netherlands)) (1998)
- "Tears Are Waiting", "Where is the Love?", "Please Can I Go Now?", "Who Would You Have Me Love?" and "Succumb To You", all on the album G:MT: The Soundtrack, (Island Records) to the movie G:MT - Greenwich Mean Time (27 September 1999)
- "Burn the Floor" on the album, Burn the Floor: Soundtrack, by various artists (MCA/Universal) (18 October 1999)
- "My Remedy" on the album, MOBO 2000, by various artists (Universal) (2 October 2000)
- "Let's Do It Again" on the album, Pure R&B Volume 2, by various artists (Telstar) (13 November 2001)
- "Let's Do It Again" on the album, Other Side, by Lynden David Hall (BMG International) (12 June 2001)
- "If You Want Me" on the album, Girls, by various artists (Spectrum Music) (2 September 2002)
- "I Just Wanna Dance", vocals on the 12" white label version by Global Rhythm (Solo Recordings) (2002)
- "Brand New Day" on the album, Untitled', by Terri Walker (Mercury Records) (3 March 2003)
- "Dreamin'" on the album, Dance and Urban, by various artists (HMV) (2004)
- "Family Affair" on the album, Revival, by Nate James (MoreThan4) (30 March 2009)
