= All Saints (All Saints album) =

1997 studio album by All Saints

Studio album by All Saints
- Released: 24 November 1997
- Studio: Metropolis
- Genres: Pop; dance-pop; R&B
- Length: 60:45
- Label: London
- Producers: Cameron McVey; Magnus Fiennes; Karl "K-Gee" Gordon; John Benson; Johnny Douglas; Nellee Hooper; Neville Henry; Karen Gibbs

All Saints chronology
| All Saints (1997) | The Remix Album (1998) |

Singles from All Saints
- 1. "I Know Where It's At" Released: 25 August 1997; 2. "Never Ever" Released: 10 November 1997; 3. "Let's Get Started" Released: 24 November 1997 (Japan only); 4. "Under the Bridge" / "Lady Marmalade" Released: 27 April 1998; 5. "Bootie Call" Released: 31 August 1998; 6. "War of Nerves" Released: 23 November 1998

All Saints is the debut studio album by English girl group All Saints. It was released on 24 November 1997 by London Records. All Saints worked with many producers on the album: Cameron McVey, John Benson, Johnny Douglas, Karl "K-Gee" Gordon, Magnus Fiennes, Nellee Hooper, Karen Gibbs and Neville Henry.

Upon its release, the album received mixed reviews from music critics, some of whom praised the choice of singles and the group's musical direction. The album spawned three number-one singles in the United Kingdom: "Never Ever", the double A-side "Under the Bridge" and "Lady Marmalade", and "Bootie Call", as well as "I Know Where It's At" (No. 4) and "War of Nerves" (No. 7). The album sold over 5 million copies worldwide.

== Singles ==
"I Know Where It's At" was the group's first single. It was written by member Shaznay Lewis along with usual writing partner Karl Gordon, and contained a sample of Steely Dan's "The Fez". It was released on 25 August 1997. Commercially, the song proved to be a success worldwide, peaking in the top twenty in Canada, United Kingdom, New Zealand, Australia (where it was certified Gold), Ireland, and France. The song received considerable radio airplay in the United States, where it was released in January 1998. It managed to crack the American Top 40, reaching No. 36 on the Billboard Hot 100, and remaining on the chart for a total of 18 weeks. A (mostly) black-and-white music video was shot, which featured the group in an urban setting; they were filmed consistently walking towards the camera, through various hallways and random party scenes.

Their second single was "Never Ever". Written by Lewis and the song's producer, Sean Mather, it was released on 10 November 1997. The song remains the group's most successful and memorable hit, peaking at No. 1 in Australia, New Zealand and United Kingdom, and achieving top-ten status in Ireland, Sweden, Canada, the Netherlands, France, Switzerland, Norway, and Austria. The song was later released on July 25, 1998, in the US, where it entered the charts at No. 13; it would go on to peak at No. 4 on the US Billboard Hot 100, for the chart dated August 22, 1998, becoming the group's highest-charting single in that country. The song remained firmly in the top 20 for 17 weeks, plus two weeks spent at No. 22, before dropping from the charts.

"Under the Bridge" and "Lady Marmalade", a double A-side single, was released on 27 April 1998. Although both songs are covers, they remain unique as each song is somewhat lyrically distinctive from the original; "Under the Bridge" is a cover of a song by the Red Hot Chili Peppers, and "Lady Marmalade" was originally performed by Patti LaBelle, with the cover featuring suggestive rap verses by Shaznay Lewis and original verses by Melanie Blatt. "Under the Bridge" managed to chart in the top twenty of the United Kingdom, Australia, Canada, New Zealand, Finland, and Sweden. "Lady Marmalade" charted as a single in Switzerland and France, and was performed on several European music awards shows and variety talk shows, but did not perform as well as the conjoined single.

Their fourth single was "Bootie Call", released on 31 August 1998. It was the group's third consecutive number one in the United Kingdom, also charting in Belgium, Ireland, the Netherlands, and Sweden. A music video was also shot for the single. The group's fifth and final single was "War of Nerves", released on 23 November 1998. While not as successful as its foregoing single releases, it did chart in New Zealand, Ireland, and the United Kingdom. A music video was shot, during which group member Melanie Blatt was pregnant.

The song "Let's Get Started" was released in 1995 with only members Melanie Blatt and Shaznay Lewis, under the name All Saints 1.9.7.5. However, when the group welcomed sisters Nicole Appleton and Natalie Appleton, they renamed the group All Saints, and the title of the song was altered to "If You Wanna Party (I Found Lovin')", and featured on the album. The song was then re-recorded with the Appleton sisters and was re-released in Japan only, on 24 November 1997. A music video was shot, which was exclusive to Japan.

== Critical reception ==
Professional ratings
Review scores
| Source | Rating |
|---|---|
| AllMusic | 3.5/5 stars |
| Robert Christgau | (1-star Honorable Mention) |
| Entertainment Weekly | C |
| The Guardian | 4/5 stars |
| Music Week | 5/5 stars |
| NME | 7/10 |
| Rolling Stone | 2.5/5 stars |
| Spin | 4/10 |

All Saints received mixed reviews from music critics, some of whom spoke favorably of the choice of singles and the group's musical direction, while others did not enjoy the music direction, and felt they lacked personality. Stephen Thomas Erlewine of AllMusic gave it a mixed review. In comparison to the Spice Girls, he felt All Saints lacked "personality", but was more charitable regarding their music direction, saying, "All four members have better voices than the Spices, and they all have a hand in writing at least one of the songs on their eponymous debut. ... More importantly, they and their producers have a better sense of contemporary dance trends—there are real hip-hop and club rhythms throughout the record." He highlighted "Never Ever", "I Know Where It's At", and "Lady Marmalade" as the album's best tracks.

== Commercial performance ==
In the United Kingdom the album debuted at number twelve for the week beginning 6 December 1997, before progressing to a peak of number two on 17 January 1998, where it remained for three consecutive weeks. It spent a total of 66 weeks on the chart. As of April 2016, the album has sold 1,469,771 copies in the United Kingdom.

It peaked within the top forty in numerous countries, and reached the top ten in Switzerland, Australia, New Zealand, the Netherlands, and Canada. The album was certified Platinum in the United States for shipments of over 1 million units. The album sold over 5 million copies worldwide.

== Track listing ==
| No. | Title | Writer(s) | Producer(s) | Length |
|---|---|---|---|---|
| 1. | "Never Ever" | Shaznay Lewis ⋅ Sean Mather ⋅ Robert Jazayeri | Cameron McVey ⋅ Magnus Fiennes | 6:25 |
| 2. | "Bootie Call" | Lewis ⋅ Karl (K-Gee) Gordon | Gordon | 3:36 |
| 3. | "I Know Where It's At" (original mix) | Lewis ⋅ Gordon ⋅ Walter Becker ⋅ Donald Fagen ⋅ Paul Griffin | McVey ⋅ Fiennes ⋅ Gordon | 5:08 |
| 4. | "Under the Bridge" | Flea ⋅ John Frusciante ⋅ Anthony Kiedis ⋅ Chad Smith | Gordon ⋅ Nellee Hooper | 4:59 |
| 5. | "Heaven" | All Saints ⋅ McVey ⋅ Fiennes | McVey ⋅ Fiennes | 4:55 |
| 6. | "Alone" | Lewis ⋅ Gordon | Gordon | 3:31 |
| 7. | "If You Wanna Party (I Found Lovin')" | Lewis ⋅ Gordon ⋅ Johnny Flippin ⋅ Michael Walker | Johnny Douglas | 4:20 |
| 8. | "Trapped" | Melanie Blatt ⋅ Karen Gibbs ⋅ Neville Henry | John Benson ⋅ Henry ⋅ Gibbs | 4:41 |
| 9. | "Beg" | Lewis ⋅ Benson ⋅ Douglas | Benson ⋅ Douglas | 4:00 |
| 10. | "Lady Marmalade" | Bob Crewe ⋅ Kenny Nolan | Benson ⋅ Douglas | 4:16 |
| 11. | "Take the Key" | Lewis ⋅ Gordon ⋅ Kirk Robinson ⋅ Nat Robinson | Gordon | 4:14 |
| 12. | "War of Nerves" | Natalie Appleton ⋅ Nicole Appleton ⋅ McVey ⋅ Fiennes ⋅ Lewis | McVey ⋅ Fiennes | 5:23 |
| 13. | "Never Ever" (Nice Hat Mix) | Lewis ⋅ Mather ⋅ Jazayeri | McVey ⋅ Fiennes ⋅ K-Gee Gordon (remixer) | 5:12 |

Japanese edition
| No. | Title | Writer(s) | Producer(s) | Length |
|---|---|---|---|---|
| 1. | "I Know Where It's At" | | | 5:02 |
| 2. | "Bootie Call" | | | 3:59 |
| 3. | "Never Ever" (radio edit) | | | 5:13 |
| 4. | "Beg" | | | 4:00 |
| 5. | "Under the Bridge" (original mix, different from the single/UK album version) | | | 5:34 |
| 6. | "Gotta Get Busy" (aka "Get Bizzy", "Lady Marmalade" B-side) | Lewis ⋅ Gordon | Gordon | 3:35 |
| 7. | "Heaven" | | | 4:42 |
| 8. | "No More Lies" ("Under the Bridge" B-side) | Lewis ⋅ Gordon | Gordon | 4:14 |
| 9. | "I Remember" ("Never Ever" B-side) | Lewis ⋅ Gordon | Gordon | 4:06 |
| 10. | "Let's Get Started" | | | 4:48 |
| 11. | "Trapped" | | | 4:30 |
| 12. | "Take the Key" | | | 4:12 |

== Charts ==
=== Weekly charts ===
| Chart (1997–1998) | Peak position |
|---|---|
| Australian Albums (ARIA) | 4 |
| Austrian Albums (Ö3 Austria) | 15 |
| Belgian Albums (Ultratop Flanders) | 5 |
| Belgian Albums (Ultratop Wallonia) | 9 |
| Canadian Albums (Billboard) | 10 |
| Danish Albums (Hitlisten) | 7 |
| Dutch Albums (Album Top 100) | 10 |
| Finnish Albums (Suomen virallinen lista) | 24 |
| French Albums (SNEP) | 19 |
| German Albums (Offizielle Top 100) | 12 |
| Hungarian Albums (MAHASZ) | 22 |
| Icelandic Albums (Tónlist) | 1 |
| Irish Albums (IRMA) | 3 |
| Italian Albums (FIMI) | 9 |
| Japanese Albums (Oricon) | 65 |
| Malaysian Albums (RIM) | 9 |
| New Zealand Albums (RMNZ) | 2 |
| Norwegian Albums (VG-lista) | 12 |
| Scottish Albums (Official Charts) | 2 |
| Spanish Albums (PROMUSICAE) | 20 |
| Swedish Albums (Sverigetopplistan) | 13 |
| Swiss Albums (Schweizer Hitparade) | 3 |
| Taiwanese Albums (IFPI) | 9 |
| UK Albums (Official Charts) | 2 |
| US Billboard 200 | 40 |

=== Year-end charts ===
| Chart (1997) | Position |
|---|---|
| UK Albums (OCC) | 20 |

| Chart (1998) | Position |
|---|---|
| Australian Albums (ARIA) | 14 |
| Belgian Albums (Ultratop Flanders) | 27 |
| Belgian Albums (Ultratop Wallonia) | 30 |
| Dutch Albums (Album Top 100) | 30 |
| French Albums (SNEP) | 52 |
| German Albums (Offizielle Top 100) | 83 |
| New Zealand Albums (RMNZ) | 37 |
| Swiss Albums (Schweizer Hitparade) | 33 |
| UK Albums (OCC) | 9 |
| US Billboard 200 | 122 |

== Certifications and sales ==
| Region | Certification | Certified units/sales |
|---|---|---|
| Australia (ARIA) | 2× Platinum | 140,000^{^} |
| Belgium (BRMA) | Gold | 25,000^{*} |
| Canada (Music Canada) | 3× Platinum | 300,000^{^} |
| France | — | 200,000 |
| Hong Kong (IFPI Hong Kong) | Gold | 10,000^{*} |
| Iceland | — | 5,082 |
| Netherlands (NVPI) | Gold | 50,000^{^} |
| New Zealand (RMNZ) | Platinum | 15,000^{^} |
| Philippines | — | 140,000 |
| Poland (ZPAV) | Gold | 50,000^{*} |
| Spain (Promusicae) | Platinum | 100,000^{^} |
| Switzerland (IFPI Switzerland) | Platinum | 50,000^{^} |
| Taiwan (RIT) | Gold | 40,226 |
| United Kingdom (BPI) | 5× Platinum | 1,469,771 |
| United States (RIAA) | Platinum | 1,200,000 |
Summaries
| Europe (IFPI) | 2× Platinum | 2,000,000^{*} |
| Worldwide | — | 5,000,000 |
^{*} Sales figures based on certification alone.^{^} Shipments figures based on certification alone.
