= Shaznay Lewis =

English singer (born 1975)

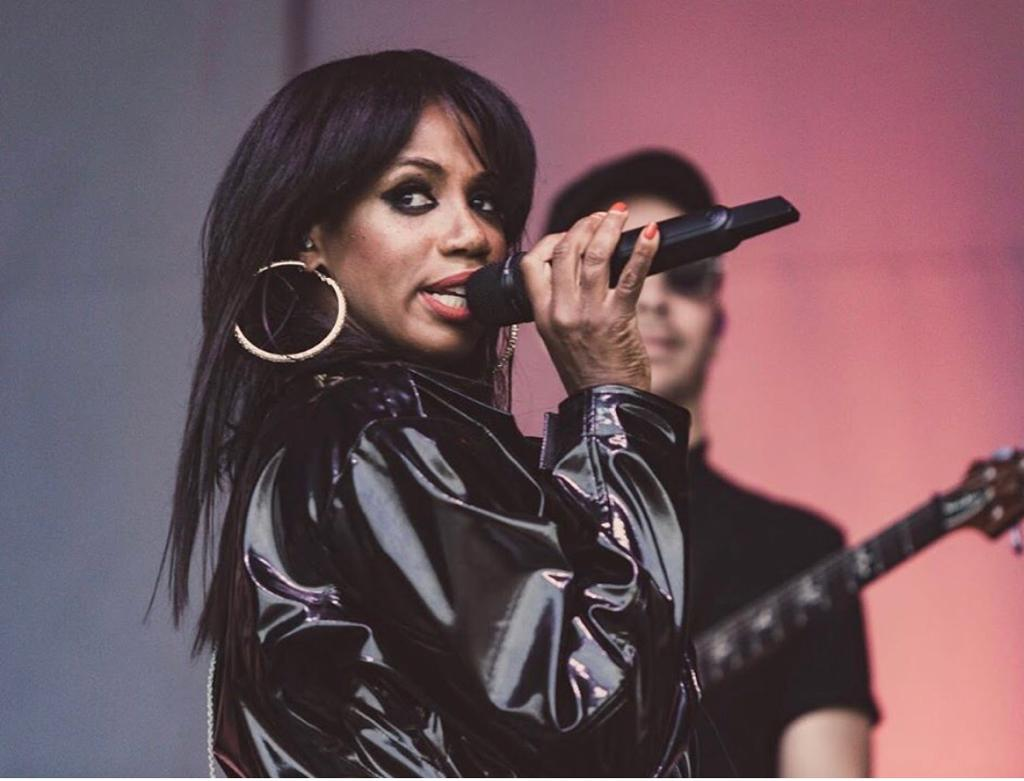
- Lewis performing in concert
- Born: Tricia Marie Lewis; 14 October 1975 (age 50); Islington, London, England
- Occupations: Singer; songwriter; rapper; actress
- Years active: 1993–present
- Spouse: Christian Horsfall (m. 2004)
- Children: 2
- Musical career
- Genres: Pop; R&B
- Instrument: Vocals
- Labels: London; 1.9.7.5
- Formerly of: All Saints

Tricia Marie "Shaznay" Lewis (born 14 October 1975) is an English singer and songwriter. Lewis rose to fame as a member of the girl group All Saints which she formed with Melanie Blatt in 1993. As a member of All Saints, Lewis won two Brit Awards and an Ivor Novello Award, and co-wrote three of the group's five UK number-one singles: "Never Ever", "Bootie Call" and "Pure Shores". In 2002, Lewis starred in the film Bend It Like Beckham.

Lewis launched her solo career with the release of her debut album Open in 2004. It entered the UK Albums Chart at number 22 and spawned the UK top 10 single "Never Felt Like This Before". Lewis' second album, Pages, was released on 17 May 2024.

== Career ==
=== 1993–2001: All Saints ===
At a party, Lewis was introduced by friends to Ben Volpeliere-Pierrot of Curiosity Killed the Cat, who took her to the Metamorphosis recording studios on All Saints Road, London, where she started doing backing vocals. It was at the Metamorphosis recording studios where she met Melanie Blatt in 1993 and they proceeded to record together. Together with Simone Rainford they formed the group All Saints 1.9.7.5., which was later renamed All Saints. Soon after, Rainford left the group and Nicole and Natalie Appleton joined.

In 1997, All Saints experienced international success with BRIT Award-winning single "Never Ever", which is co-written by Lewis and topped the charts in the United Kingdom and Australia. The single sold over 1.2 million copies in the United Kingdom, being certified double platinum by the British Phonographic Industry. The same year, the group released their debut album All Saints. Most of the songs were co-written by Lewis and the album reached number two in the United Kingdom. It was eventually certified platinum five times for sales of 1.5 million copies. In 2000 the group released their fourth number one single "Pure Shores", written by Lewis and William Orbit; the single was certified platinum by the BPI for sales of 600,000 copies. The group released their fifth number one single "Black Coffee", which was certified silver for sales of 200,000 copies.

In early 2001, All Saints broke up and Lewis began work on her solo career. The same year she won the Ivor Novello Award for best songwriting.

=== 2002–2004: Open ===
In 2004, it was reported that Lewis would release her debut solo single "Never Felt Like This Before" on 5 July, which would precede her untitled debut solo album on which she'd worked with numerous writers and producers including: Basement Jaxx, Biz Markie, K-Gee, Bacon and Quarmby and Trevor Jackson. The single reached no. 8 in the United Kingdom. On 19 July she released her debut album Open, and it reached no. 22 in the United Kingdom. Later that year she released new single "You", which peaked at no. 56 in the United Kingdom.

Lewis has also appeared in several films including a role as Mel in the BAFTA and Golden Globe nominated Bend It Like Beckham (2002). She also played a role in Hideous Man (2002). On 14 November 2004 Lewis was involved in the Band Aid 20 re-recording of "Do They Know It's Christmas?".

=== 2006–2019: All Saints reunion and songwriting ===
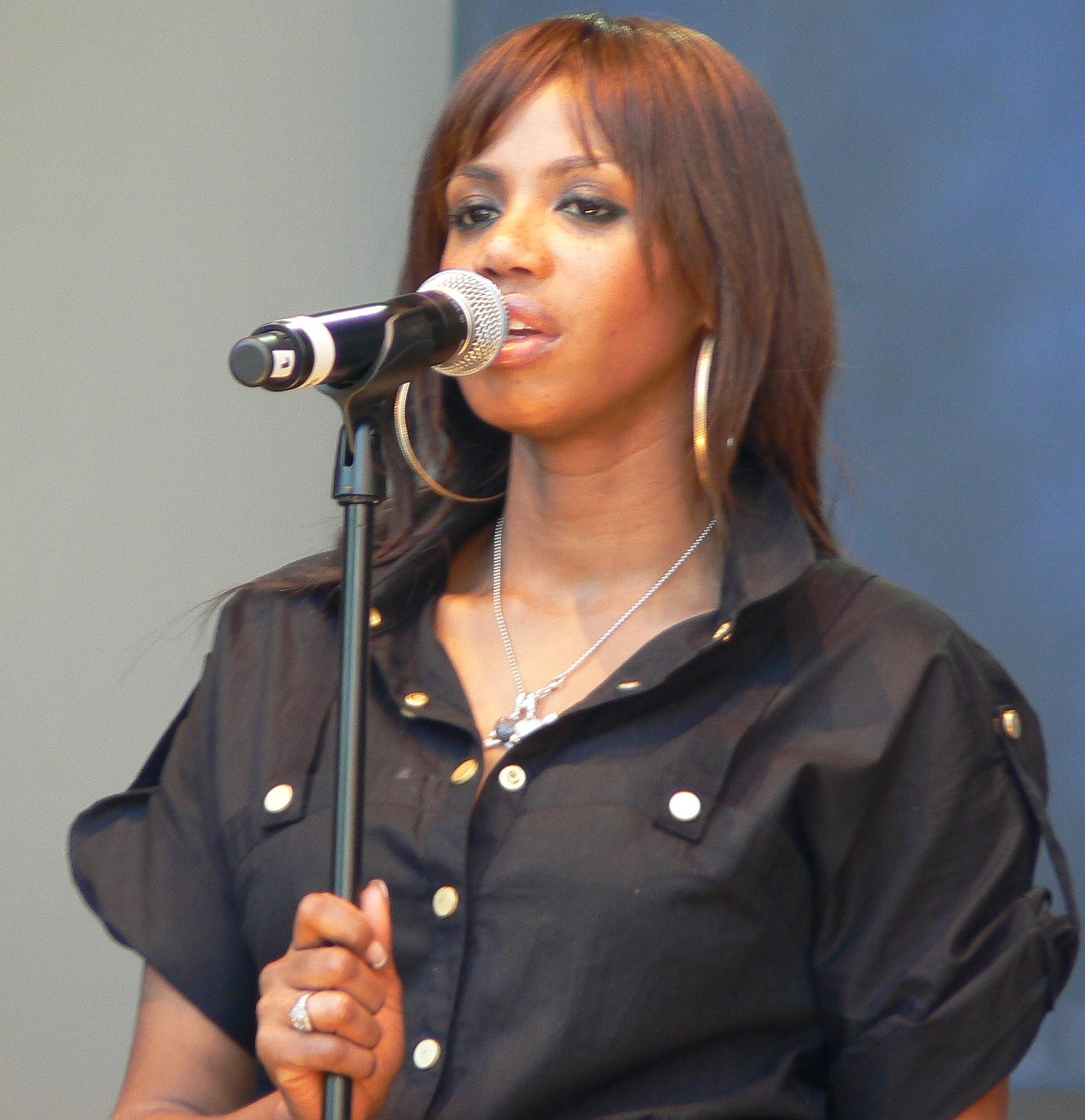
Lewis in 2007

On 24 January 2006, it was announced that All Saints had reformed with a new recording contract and would release a new album, Studio 1 on 13 November 2006. She performed with All Saints on live television for the first time since reforming on the British light entertainment program Ant & Dec's Saturday Night Takeaway on 21 October 2006. All Saints' comeback began well, with their single, "Rock Steady", reaching no. 3 in the UK Singles Chart. They followed this with the release of their comeback album Studio 1. It peaked at no. 40 in the UK Albums Chart. Parlophone Records then released their second single "Chick Fit", but this failed to reach the chart. All Saints then parted company with their record label.

In January 2008, Lewis featured on the Wideboys track, "Daddy-O". The single was released on 5 May 2008 and peaked at No. 32 in the UK. As a songwriter, Lewis is credited in Westlife's track "Reach Out", which was featured on their 2009 album Where We Are, the CocknBullKid track "Distractions" from her 2011 album Adulthood and the Stooshe single "Black Heart", released as a single in 2012. In August 2012, it was reported Lewis was in the studio with original Sugababes line-up Mutya Keisha Siobhan, writing new material for their debut album.

In 2014, All Saints reformed to support the Backstreet Boys for five dates across the UK and Ireland in 2014. On 27 January 2016, it was confirmed that All Saints will release their fourth studio album Red Flag on 8 April 2016. The lead single from the album, "One Strike", preceded the album on 26 February 2016. All Saints more recently released the 2018 album Testament saw the band reunite with producer William Orbit and was preceded by the singles Love Lasts Forever and After All. Both albums were written by Lewis and a string of collaborators including Fred Ball, Invisible Men, Futurecut & many more. To support both album releases, All Saints embarked on two UK tours, headlined festivals across the world and appeared as special guests on Take That's Wonderland Live arena and stadium tour.

In 2019, Lewis co-wrote the theme music for the Netflix original series Turn Up Charlie with Idris Elba.

=== 2023–present: Pages ===
On 14 November 2023 it was confirmed that Lewis would be performing at Mighty Hoopla in June 2024. On 12 January 2024, she released the single "Miracle", her first solo single in twenty years. In an interview with Entertainment Focus, Lewis said that the song came from "a relentless writing process between Emily Phillips and me. We pushed each other, we changed it a lot until, and when I finally listened to it I realised it was a love song to myself, about the person I’ve been for the past 25 years and where I am now. It’s a message of encouragement to return to my love of writing with self-esteem, and confidence in the way that made me happy."

It was announced on 29 January 2024 that Lewis would release her second studio album, Pages, on 17 May 2024 through 1.9.7.5. Recordings. Further singles, "Kiss of Life", "Good Mourning" (which featured Shola Ama and General Levy) and "Got to Let Go", preceded the album. Official music videos for "Kiss of Life" and "Good Mourning" were released.

== Personal life ==
Lewis was born in Islington to a Barbadian father and a Jamaican mother.

Despite growing up in a Spurs supporting household, Lewis made three appearances for Arsenal L.F.C. when she was a teenager. On 21 August 2004, Lewis married dancer Christian "Storm" Horsfall. They had their first child, a son named Tyler-Xaine, in February 2006. In November 2009, Lewis and her husband had their second child, a daughter named Tigerlily.

== Discography ==
=== Studio albums ===
List of studio albums, with selected chart positions
Title	Details	Peak chart positions		
Title	Details	UK	UK R&B	SCO
Open	Released: 19 July 2004; Label: London; Format: CD, digital download	22	12	23
Pages	Released: 17 May 2024; Label: 1.9.7.5.; Format: CD, LP, cassette, digital download, streaming	— (Note: "Pages" did not enter the UK Albums Chart, but debuted and peaked at number 13 on the UK Album Downloads Chart and number 9 on the UK Independent Chart.)	—	23
"—" denotes releases that did not chart or were not released in that territory.

=== Singles ===
As main artist

List of singles, with selected chart positions
Single	Year	Peak chart positions					Album
Single	Year	UK	GER	IRL	NZ	SCO	Album
"Never Felt Like This Before"	2004	8	82	35	19	7	Open
"You"	2004	56	—	—	—	62	Open
"Miracle"	2024	— (Note: "Miracle" did not enter the UK Singles Chart, but peaked at number 80 on the UK Singles Downloads Chart.)	—	—	—	—	Pages
"Kiss of Life"	2024	— (Note: "Kiss of Life" did not enter the UK Singles Chart, but peaked at number 84 on the UK Singles Downloads Chart.)	—	—	—	—	Pages
"Good Mourning" (with Shola Ama and General Levy)	2024	—	—	—	—	—	Pages
"Got to Let Go"	2024	—	—	—	—	—	Pages
"—" denotes releases that did not chart or were not released in that territory.

As featured artist

List of singles, with selected chart positions
Single	Year	Peak chart positions		Album
Single	Year	UK	SCO	Album
"I Wanna Be Your Lady" (Hinda Hicks featuring Shaznay Lewis)	1997	14	—	Hinda
"Daddy-O" (Wideboys featuring Shaznay Lewis)	2008	32	37	non-album single
"Ice Cream" (Anthony Asher featuring Shaznay Lewis)	2008	—	—	non-album single
"—" denotes releases that did not chart or were not released in that territory.

=== Other appearances ===
Title	Year	Album
"Dream the Dream"	2002	Bend It Like Beckham

=== Music videos ===
Title	Year	Director	Notes
"Never Felt Like This Before"	2004	Amy Holms	
"You"	2004	Amy Holms	
"Kiss of Life"	2024	Oscar J Ryan	
Guest appearance
"I Don't Really Care"	2000	—N/a	K-Gee's music video
"Free"	2004	—N/a	Estelle's music video
"Lifeless"	2005	—N/a	N-Dubz's music video

== Filmography ==
=== Films ===
Year	Title	Role
2002	Hideous Man	Regina
2002	Bend It Like Beckham	Mel
TBA	Girl Group	TBA
