= Never Ever (All Saints song) =

1997 single by All Saints

Single by All Saints

from the album All Saints
- B-side: "I Remember"
- Released: 10 November 1997
- Genre: Pop; soul; R&B
- Length: 6:29 (album version); 4:48 (radio edit)
- Label: London
- Songwriters: Shaznay Lewis; Robert Jazayeri; Sean Mather
- Producers: Cameron McVey; Magnus Fiennes

All Saints singles chronology
| "I Know Where It's At" (1997) | "Never Ever" (1997) | "Under the Bridge" / "Lady Marmalade" (1998) |

Music videos
- "Never Ever" on YouTube; "Never Ever" (US version) on YouTube

"Never Ever" is a song by English girl group All Saints. Written by All Saints member Shaznay Lewis along with co-writers Robert Jazayeri and Sean Mather and produced by Cameron McVey and Magnus Fiennes, it was released on 10 November 1997 as the second single from their debut album, All Saints (1997). In Japan, it served as the third single, as "Let's Get Started" was issued as the second single there.

"Never Ever" is All Saints' highest-charting single, topping the charts in several countries, including Australia, New Zealand and the United Kingdom. It peaked within the top 10 in numerous other countries, including Ireland, Sweden, Canada, the Netherlands, France, Switzerland, Norway, Austria and the United States. As of June 2019, it is the third-best-selling single by a girl group of all time in the United Kingdom, behind "Wannabe" by the Spice Girls and "Shout Out to My Ex" by Little Mix.

Two music videos were shot for the single: the European and Australian version, and an American version, due to the mass success in those countries. The North American featured the group in a church, while the European/Australian version featured the group near a swimming pool and in their homes. At the 1998 Brit Awards, "Never Ever" won British Single of the Year and British Video of the Year.

== Background ==
After the success of their debut single "I Know Where It's At", the group All Saints decided to record and produce their debut full-length studio album. "Never Ever" was released as the second single from their first album All Saints. The song was written by All Saints member Shaznay Lewis along with co-writers Robert Jazayeri and Sean Mather, and was produced by Cameron McVey and Magnus Fiennes. Lewis wrote the song after splitting up with a boyfriend, but the music conveyed the impression that all would be well. Soon after they signed their first major label deal with London Records, she discovered that the rest of the group—Melanie Blatt and Canadian sisters Nicole and Natalie Appleton—had presented the label head with a tape of vocal recordings they had made without her. It was their version of Lewis's own song "Never Ever" that made him pay attention to the music. "He asked who had written it, so then they were forced to come back and get me," Lewis commented. "Looking back on it, that was pretty low. I think that's why the whole time I knew that if I didn't write I'd be out on my ear".

All Saints flew to the United States, where the song was recorded and produced by Mather and Jazayeri. Due to control issues, London Records brought in Cameron McVey to do additional production on the track because of time/distance constraints and Cameron's relationship with Lewis. Lewis was in tears over the success of "Never Ever", since it was written about a personal broken relationship, and said, "I never believed that so much good could come out of such a bad situation." All Saints recorded the vocals in Washington, D.C., except for the intro, which was recorded at Battery Studios in London and was kept from the original demo. This was because the mood could not be replicated and everyone agreed to keep the demo vocals.

However, the song's producing and writing caused controversy. Robert Jazayeri, who wrote the song, issued a writ against All Saints, and they were granted 40% of the publishing rights to the track. After he was not satisfied, Jazayeri filed a lawsuit towards the group's record label London Records and All Saints' management, which was settled amicably by the parties.

== Composition ==
"Never Ever"
A sample of the song.

The song is set in common time at a tempo of 67 beats per minute. The lyrics are about the girls' first expressions after a sad break-up, and the girls ask what they did wrong in the relationship.

Stephen Thomas Erlewine from AllMusic described the musical content as an "extraordinary gospel-tinged" song. Nick Butler from Sputnikmusic described the musical content as a "power ballad".

The melody of the song is based upon an overlay of the hymn tune "New Britain", the most common setting for "Amazing Grace", which according to Ger Tillekens is the reason it became so successful.

== Critical reception ==
"Never Ever" received positive reviews from music critics. Stephen Thomas Erlewine from AllMusic named the song as a highlight on its album, stating it "lead[s] the way" for All Saints' career. He then reviewed the 2001 All Hits compilation record and said the track was a "basic hit", but called it a standout. Billboard placed it at number 47 on their list of "100 Greatest Girl Group Songs of All Time" in 2017. Scottish newspaper Daily Record described it as a "cool slice of soulful pop." A reviewer from Music Week rated it five out of five, adding that "the Saints go gospel and sultry in this follow-up to "I Know Where It's At". A slower-paced single is a gamble, but this is an addictive alternative to the Spice Girls." Paul Martin from The News Letter commented that the song "has already made an impact on the charts, but those listening to the album version will be in for a bit of a surprise. Unlike the more upbeat chart version, they slow the song down to great effect and allow the lonesome mood of the song to prevail." Nick Butler from Sputnikmusic stated, "'Never Ever' is a fantastic song; quite rightfully, it still gets a fair bit of airplay today, and I still enjoy it whenever it appears on one of those VH1 Power Ballad days or whatever."

== Commercial performance ==
"Never Ever" debuted at number three on the UK Singles Chart on the week starting 16 November 1997 and spent the next seven weeks rising and falling within the top six. On 11 January 1998, with a weekly sale of 54,000 units, the song rose to number one for that week only, setting the record for the most copies sold by a single in the UK before it became a number-one hit, with 770,000 copies purchased. The song remains the group's longest-lasting single on the UK chart and stayed in the top 10 for 15 weeks, charting for 26 weeks. It is the third-best-selling single by a girl group in the UK, behind "Wannabe" by the Spice Girls and "Shout Out to My Ex" by Little Mix.

The song debuted at number 30 on the Australian Singles Chart and rose to number one, staying there for seven consecutive weeks and stayed in the charts for 22 weeks. It was successful in the charts and was certified double platinum by Australian Recording Industry Association (ARIA), with sales of 140,000. The song was successful in New Zealand as well, debuting at number one and staying there for five consecutive weeks. It was the group's only number one single in that country. It stayed in the charts for 13 weeks in total.

The song was successful in European markets. It debuted at number 10 in the Swedish Singles Chart, peaked at three for one week and stayed in the charts for 20 weeks. It was certified gold in that country. It debuted at number 27 on the French Singles Chart, and peaked at number four for one week. It stayed in the charts for 21 weeks. The song peaked at number four in the Netherlands for three consecutive weeks, and lasted 24 weeks in the chart. The song debuted at number 29 on the Austrian Singles Chart, and peaked at number seven for two consecutive weeks. It lasted for 19 weeks in the charts. The song debuted at number 15 in Norway, and peaked at number six, staying in the charts for 12 weeks. It was not as successful on the Finnish Singles Chart, peaking at number 12 and staying in the charts for two weeks.

"Never Ever" was successful in North America as well. The song debuted at number 13 on the US Billboard Hot 100, and peaked at number four on the charts, becoming the group's first top 10 and their highest-peaking single on those charts. The song peaked at number seven on the Canadian Singles Chart.

== Music video ==
When this song was first released in Europe, the accompanying music video featured the girls first in a swimming pool and then in a house. It was shot by fashion photographer Sean Ellis. The cinematographer for the video was the legendary Freddie Francis and it would be his final work before his death. The video won best British Video of the Year at the 1998 Brit Awards.

For the United States, the video was re-shot and re-edited to show the girls in a church or cathedral setting during the introductory spoken part. As they progress into the actual sung part around the one minute mark, the setting abruptly changes to a gritty industrial underpass. When All Saints – The Video was released, it was decided to release both versions on the video, because the European audience hadn't seen both. In Canada, MuchMusic played both versions.

== Legacy ==
The song was featured in the Guinness World Records for Top British Singles. A total of 1,263,658 copies of the single were sold in the UK, making it All Saints' biggest hit; 770,000 copies were sold before it reached number one; this is more than any single ever before in UK chart history. At the 1998 Brit Awards, All Saints won two Brit Awards for this single: Best British Single and Best British Video, beating strong competition from the likes of "Bitter Sweet Symphony" by the Verve, "Song 2" by Blur, "Paranoid Android" by Radiohead and "Something About the Way/Candle in the Wind 1997" by Elton John.

== Track listings ==
- UK CD1 and Australian CD single
1. "Never Ever"
2. "Never Ever" (Nice Hat mix)
3. "I Remember"
- UK CD2
1. "Never Ever"
2. "Never Ever" (Booker T's vocal mix)
3. "Never Ever" (Booker T's Down South dub)
4. "Never Ever" (Booker T's Up North dub)
- UK 12-inch single
1. "Never Ever" (All Star remix)
2. "Never Ever" (Booker T's vocal mix)
- UK cassette single and European CD single
1. "Never Ever"
2. "I Remember"
- US CD and cassette single
1. "Never Ever"
2. "Never Ever" (Rickidy Raw urban mix)
3. "I Remember"
- Japanese CD single
1. "Never Ever"
2. "Never Ever" (Nice Hat mix)
3. "I Remember"
4. "Never Ever" (Booker T's vocal mix)
5. "Never Ever" (Booker T's Up North dub)

== Charts ==
=== Weekly charts ===
| Chart (1997–1998) | Peak position |
|---|---|
| Australia (ARIA) | 1 |
| Austria (Ö3 Austria Top 40) | 7 |
| Belgium (Ultratop 50 Flanders) | 4 |
| Belgium (Ultratop 50 Wallonia) | 16 |
| Canada Top Singles (RPM) | 7 |
| Canada Adult Contemporary (RPM) | 17 |
| Denmark (IFPI) | 3 |
| Estonia (Eesti Top 20) | 20 |
| Europe (Eurochart Hot 100) | 4 |
| Finland (Suomen virallinen lista) | 12 |
| France (SNEP) | 4 |
| Germany (GfK) | 18 |
| Hungary (Mahasz) | 3 |
| Iceland (Íslenski Listinn Topp 40) | 4 |
| Ireland (IRMA) | 2 |
| Italy (Musica e dischi) | 9 |
| Italy Airplay (Music & Media) | 5 |
| Netherlands (Dutch Top 40) | 4 |
| Netherlands (Single Top 100) | 4 |
| New Zealand (Recorded Music NZ) | 1 |
| Norway (VG-lista) | 6 |
| Scottish Singles Sales (Official Charts) | 1 |
| Sweden (Sverigetopplistan) | 3 |
| Switzerland (Schweizer Hitparade) | 4 |
| Taiwan (IFPI) | 9 |
| UK Singles (Official Charts) | 1 |
| UK Airplay (Music Week) | 1 |
| UK Hip Hop/R&B (Official Charts) | 1 |
| US Billboard Hot 100 | 4 |
| US Mainstream Top 40 (Billboard) | 3 |
| US Rhythmic Top 40 (Billboard) | 25 |

=== Year-end charts ===
| Chart (1997) | Position |
|---|---|
| UK Singles (OCC) | 13 |

| Chart (1998) | Position |
|---|---|
| Australia (ARIA) | 5 |
| Austria (Ö3 Austria Top 40) | 30 |
| Belgium (Ultratop 50 Flanders) | 19 |
| Belgium (Ultratop 50 Wallonia) | 58 |
| Brazil (Crowley) | 38 |
| Canada Top Singles (RPM) | 31 |
| Canada Adult Contemporary (RPM) | 79 |
| Europe (Eurochart Hot 100) | 13 |
| France (SNEP) | 53 |
| Germany (Media Control) | 99 |
| Iceland (Íslenski Listinn Topp 40) | 62 |
| Netherlands (Dutch Top 40) | 21 |
| Netherlands (Single Top 100) | 13 |
| New Zealand (RIANZ) | 9 |
| Sweden (Hitlistan) | 24 |
| Switzerland (Schweizer Hitparade) | 24 |
| UK Singles (OCC) | 16 |
| UK Airplay (Music Week) | 8 |
| US Billboard Hot 100 | 42 |
| US Mainstream Top 40 (Billboard) | 20 |
| US Rhythmic Top 40 (Billboard) | 86 |

== Certifications ==
| Region | Certification | Certified units/sales |
|---|---|---|
| Australia (ARIA) | 2× Platinum | 140,000^{^} |
| Belgium (BRMA) | Gold | 25,000^{*} |
| New Zealand (RMNZ) | Platinum | 30,000^{‡} |
| Sweden (GLF) | Gold | 15,000^{^} |
| Switzerland (IFPI Switzerland) | Gold | 25,000^{^} |
| United Kingdom (BPI) | 3× Platinum | 1,800,000^{‡} |
| United States | — | 470,000 |
^{*} Sales figures based on certification alone.^{^} Shipments figures based on certification alone.^{‡} Sales+streaming figures based on certification alone.

== Release history ==
| Region | Date | Format(s) | Label(s) | Ref. |
|---|---|---|---|---|
| United Kingdom | 10 November 1997 | CD; cassette | London | |
| United States | 7 April 1998 | Contemporary hit radio | London | |
| Japan | 20 May 1998 | CD | London | |
| United States | 7 July 1998 | 7-inch vinyl; CD; cassette | London | |
