= K-Gee =

- Born: Karl Clive Gordon
- Occupations: Musician, songwriter

Karl Clive Gordon, known by the stage name K-Gee, is a British DJ, producer, rapper and songwriter and former member of the Outlaw Posse.

Gordon was brought up listening to reggae by his father and was inspired to become a DJ after listening to Grandmaster Flash's "The Message" and other early hip-hop tracks.

K-Gee and his friend Bello decided to start Outlaw Posse and one of his demo tapes ended up at Richie Rich and in 1990 the debut single "Party" was released and later the album My Afros on Fire. In 1992, the second album The Oneness of Two Minds in Unison was released, however the band split up and K-Gee returned to being a DJ.

In May 1996, K-Gee met Melanie Blatt and Shaznay Lewis who were formerly in All Saints 1.9.7.5., and wanted to relaunch their group with their new-found bandmembers Natalie and Nicole Appleton. Together they recorded "I Know Where It's At" and after All Saints managed to land a recording contract, he co-wrote and produced their first album, All Saints. The album turned out to be successful and scored three consecutive number 1 hits in the United Kingdom. K-Gee accompanied them on their tour and was widely regarded as their fifth member.

The success allowed K-Gee to do production and songwriting for other bands as well. K-Gee has worked with TQ, Carl Thomas, Gabrielle, Rod Stewart, Hinda Hicks, Noreaga, George Michael, Pras, Glamma Kid, Jamie Cullum, Jessie J and Esmée Denters.

In 2000, K-Gee signed to independent record label Instant Karma. On 23 October 2000, K-Gee released his debut single "I Don't Really Care", which peaked at No. 22 on the UK Singles Chart. His debut album Bounce to This was released on 7 October 2002.

In 2023, K-Gee began producing the punk outfit, Dogz or Godz.

== Discography ==
=== Albums ===
Solo

- Bounce to This (7 October 2002)

With other artists

- My Afros on Fire with Outlaw Posse (1990)
- The Oneness of II Minds in Unison with Brothers Like Outlaw (1992)

=== Singles ===
Solo

- "I Don't Really Care" (2000) – UK #22
- "Stay True" (2001)
- "Upside Down" (2002) – UK #92

With other bands

- "The Original Dope!" with Outlaw Posse (1989)
- "Party" with Outlaw Posse (1990)
- "Stop the Negativity" with Outlaw Posse (1990)
- "Party Time" with Outlaw (1992)

=== Production and remixes ===
- All Saints (November 1997) by All Saints
- New Direction (1998) by Adeva
- Right Here, Right Now (1999) by Fierce
- Bills 2 Pay (1999) by Glamma Kid
- Saints & Sinners (October 2000) by All Saints
- Open (July 2004) by Shaznay Lewis
- Outside: The Mixes by George Michael
- Studio 1 (2006) by All Saints
- We Run Things (2009) by Jamie Cullum
- Stand Up (2011) by Jessie J
- Screaming Out Loud (2012) by Esmée Denters
