= Side by Side (Appleton EP) =

EP by Appleton
- Released: September 4, 2026
- Recorded: 2025–2026
- Genre: Pop
- Length: 16:31
- Labels: Appleton Recordings, Absolute Label Services
- Producers: Shadowhands, Pete Hoffman, Dick Beetham

Singles from Side by Side
- 1. "Falling Into You" Released: January 15, 2026; 2. "Ready To Begin" Released: June 3, 2026

Side by Side is the first EP, and the first full release since 2003, by Canadian musical duo Appleton, made up of sisters Natalie and Nicole Appleton. It was released on September 4, 2026, through Absolute Label Services. Two singles preceded the EP: "Falling Into You" and "Ready to Begin". The EP marks the duos reunification, following the third indefinite hiatus of the duo's previous group All Saints in 2022, and the re-release of their debut album Everything's Eventual in 2023 commemorating its twentieth anniversary.

== Background ==
The Appleton sisters were members of the UK girl band All Saints from 1996-2001. Following this the duo split off and released their first studio album Everything's Eventual, to warm critical reception and moderate commercial success. Following this All Saints reunified, first over 2006-2008 and again from 2013-2022.

Following All Saints third indefinite hiatus the group released Everything's EVentual on vinyl in 2023 and teased new music. After returning to the studio in 2025 they announced their reformation in January 2026 with the release of their first single in 23 years years, Falling Into You. Following its release the duo appeared on the BBC Radio 2 Piano room in February, and performed at Mighty Hoopla in May.

At Mighty Hoopla they teased new music and the following month announced their new EP 'Side by Side', to be released in September, preceded by the second single 'Ready to Begin'. The duo spoke about how they had been encouraged to go back into the studio by their children and chose to work with many of the same producers and musicians as on their debut album twenty years previously.

In addition to Mighty Hoopla, the duo supported the release with other performances, notably Radio 2 in the park.

== Critical reception ==
The EP was well reviewed, with Music New.com calling it 'a timely reminder that this is a duo who should never have disappeared into the musical wilderness in the first place'. It noted that the EP's structure and style mirrored their debut opening with 'a feisty, forward-thinking pop anthem before following it with a lush ballad — although this time the emphasis is more on gorgeous harmonies and a beautifully judged mid-tempo feel.' The review also defended the EP's short length as 'purposeful' and 'all killer, no filler'.

== Track listing ==
No.	Title	Lyrics	Music	Producer(s)	Length
1.	"Ready to Begin"	Nicole Appleton; Natalie Appleton; Daniel Zak Watts; Gareth Young	Greg Young; Chris Haddon; Bnann Infadel	Shadowhands	3:42
2.	"Falling into you"	Nicole Appleton; Natalie Appleton; Daniel Zak Watts; Greg Young	Gareth Young; Chris Haddon; Bnann Infadel; Jo McNab	Shadowhands	3:41
3.	"Strange Kinda Paradise"	Nicole Appleton[Natalie Appleton; Daniel Zak Watts; Gareth Young	Gareth Young; Chris Haddon; Bnann Infadel	Shadowhands	3:32
4.	"Monster"	Nicole Appleton; Natalie Appleton; Daniel Zak Watts; Gareth Young	Gareth Young; Chris Haddon; Bnann Infadel; Paddy Mitton; Lucy Cox	Shadowhands	2:53
5.	"Witchita Lineman - Live from the BBC 2 Piano Room"	Jimmy Webb	Shadowhands	Rebecca Turner; Cherenne Price; Lucy Hartley; Cormac Browne; Rustom Pomery; Matthew Elston; Marcus Broome; Iona Allen; Robin Martin; Nigel Goodwin; Helen Knief; Judit Keleman; Matthew Lee; Cameron Smith; Sam Wienstein; Stacy-Ann Miller; Ileana Ruhemann; Lewis Graham; Richard Bayliss; Mike Lloyd; Stephen Wibeley; Anne-Denholm Blair; Kate Chatburn; BBC Concert Orchestra	3:02

Adapted from the EP's's liner notes.
