= Don't Worry (Appleton song) =

2003 single by Appleton

Single by Appleton

from the album Everything's Eventual
- Released: 10 February 2003
- Genre: Pop
- Length: 4:48 (album version); 4:16 (radio edit)
- Label: Polydor
- Songwriters: Natalie Appleton, Damian Aspinall, Craig Stephen Dodds
- Producer: Craigie Dodds

Appleton singles chronology
"Fantasy" (2002)	"Don't Worry" (2003)	"Everything Eventually" (2003)

"Don't Worry" is a song by Canadian music duo Appleton, taken from their debut album, Everything's Eventual. Produced by Craigie Dodds, it was released as the album's second single on 10 February 2003. The song peaked at number five on the UK Singles Chart in its first week of release before dropping out of the top 10.

== Music video ==
The "Don't Worry" video shows Natalie and Nicole Appleton playing with a magic chair which can bend a long way without falling. Near the end of the video, Natalie appears to have Nicole in a headlock.

== Usage in media ==
"Don't Worry" was used from 2003 onwards as the music for the Galaxy chocolate bar advertisements.

== Track listings ==
- UK maxi-single
1. "Don't Worry" (radio edit) – 4:16
2. "Don't Worry" (Angry Mexican DJs Retronic edit) – 5:21
3. "Don't Worry" (Lucien Foort vocal edit) – 4:59
4. "Don't Worry" (King Britt vocal edit) – 5:10
- UK enhanced single
1. "Don't Worry" (radio edit) – 4:16
2. "Sugarman" – 3:56
3. "Open to Suggestion" – 3:46
4. "Don't Worry" (music video)

== Charts ==
=== Weekly charts ===
Chart (2003)	Peak position
Netherlands (Single Top 100)	95
Switzerland (Schweizer Hitparade)	89
Scottish Singles Sales (Official Charts)	6
UK Singles (Official Charts)	5

=== Year-end charts ===
Chart (2003)	Position
UK Singles (OCC)	151

== See also ==
- Appleton discography
