= Antonio Fargas =

American actor (born 1946)

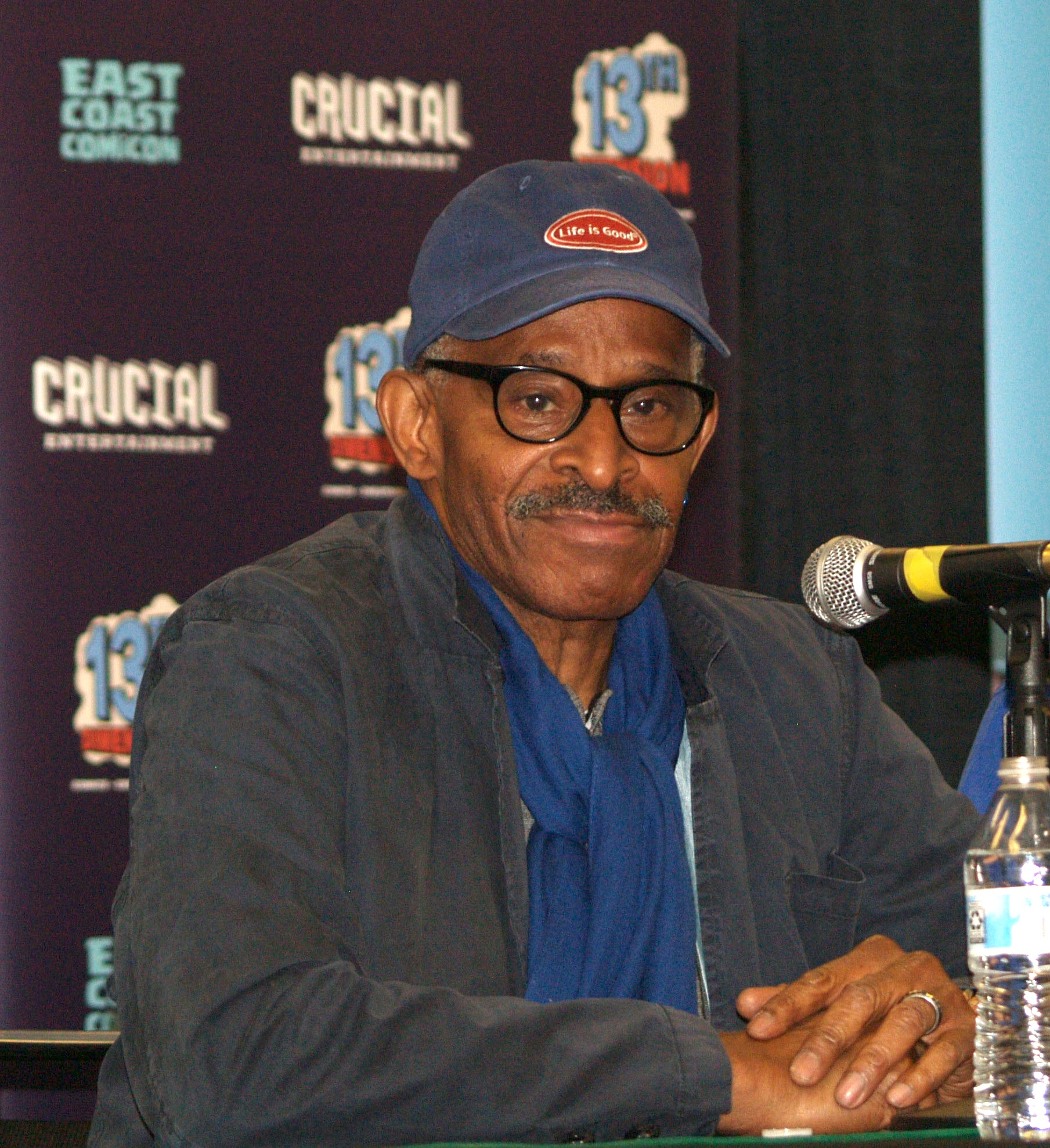
- Fargas at the 2018 East Coast Comicon in Secaucus, New Jersey
- Born: August 14, 1946 (age 80); New York City, New York, U.S.
- Occupation: Actor
- Years active: 1963–present
- Known for: Huggy Bear – Starsky & Hutch
- Spouses: Taylor Hastie (m. 1979; div. 1988); Sandra Reed (m. 1989)
- Children: 4, including Justin Fargas
- Website: www.AntonioFargas.com

Antonio Fargas (born August 14, 1946) is an American actor known for his roles in 1970s blaxploitation and comedy movies, as well as his portrayal as Huggy Bear in the 1970s TV series Starsky & Hutch.

== Early life ==
Fargas was born in New York City to Mildred (née Bailey) and Manuel Fargas; he was one of 11 children. His father was Puerto Rican and worked for the City of New York. His mother was from Trinidad and Tobago. Raised in New York's Spanish Harlem, Fargas graduated from Fashion Industries High School in 1965.

== Acting career ==
Fargas' breakout role was in the comedy film Putney Swope (1969). After starring in a string of blaxploitation movies in the early 1970s, such as Across 110th Street (1972) and Foxy Brown (1974), he gained recognition as streetwise informant Huggy Bear in the television series Starsky & Hutch. He appeared in All My Children beginning in 1982 as Les Baxter, the upper-class lawyer who was the father of Angie Hubbard; the character of Les was killed in 1987.

As a nod to his early roles, Fargas had a part in the blaxploitation spoof I'm Gonna Git You Sucka (1988) as well as another Wayans brothers "hood" parody, Don't Be a Menace (1996). He guest-starred in the mid-1990s sitcoms Living Single, Martin, The Fresh Prince of Bel-Air and The Steve Harvey Show. Fargas played the driver in the 1997 music video for the Backstreet Boys hit "Everybody (Backstreet's Back)" and also appeared as a robot in their music video for "Larger than Life (song)" in 1999.

Some of Fargas' notable appearances on British television shows include Series 4 of the reality series I'm a Celebrity...Get Me Out of Here! in 2004 and Frank Sidebottom's Proper Telly Show in early 2006. He played the part of Toledo in a revival of August Wilson's Ma Rainey's Black Bottom at the Royal Exchange Theatre in Manchester in 2006. He had a regular role as Doc on the 2005–2009 television series Everybody Hates Chris.

In 2008, Fargas acted in the British boxing film Sucker Punch. He appeared in an episode of Fox's Lie to Me as the father of a murdered firefighter.

== Personal life ==
Fargas' son Justin Fargas, a University of Southern California alumnus, is a former NFL running back who played seven seasons for the Oakland Raiders, amassing over 3,000 rushing yards in his career. Fargas's daughter-in-law is Nikki Caldwell, the president of the Las Vegas Aces of the WNBA.

== Filmography ==
Key
†	Denotes projects that have not yet been released

=== Film ===
Year	Film	Role	Notes
1963	The Cool World		Uncredited
1967	Ironside	T.D. Harris	TV film
1969	Putney Swope	The Arab	
1969	Stiletto	Man in jazz club	Uncredited
1970	Pound	Greyhound	
1971	Shaft	Bunky	
1971	Cisco Pike	Brother Buffalo	
1971	Believe in Me	Boy	
1972	Across 110th Street	Henry J. Jackson	
1973	Cleopatra Jones	Doodlebug	
1974	Busting	Stephen	
1974	Conrack	Quickfellow	
1974	Foxy Brown	Link Brown	
1974	The Gambler	Pimp	
1975	Huckleberry Finn	Jim	TV film
1975	Cornbread, Earl and Me	One-Eye	
1976	Next Stop, Greenwich Village	Bernstein Chandler	
1976	Adventurizing with the Chopper	Leonard Jones	TV film
1976	Car Wash	Lindy	
1978	Pretty Baby	The Professor	
1979	Milo Milo	Doc	
1980	Escape	Jamie Valdez	TV film
1980	Nurse	Marshall Gripps	TV film
1980	Up the Academy	Coach	
1982	The Ambush Murders	Vaness	TV film
1982	A House Divided: Denmark Vesey's Rebellion		TV film
1982	Paper Dolls	Oliver	TV film
1982	Model Behaviour	Mr. Henri	
1984	A Good Sport	Clifford	TV film
1984	Firestarter	Taxi Driver	
1984	P.O.P.	Frank Wilkey	TV film
1985	Crimewave	Blind Man	
1985	Streetwalkin'	Finesse	
1986	Florida Straits	El Gato Negro	TV film
1988	Night of the Sharks	Paco	
1988	Shakedown	Nicky 'N.C.' Carr	
1988	I'm Gonna Git You Sucka	Flyguy	
1991	Howling VI: The Freaks	Bellamey	Direct-to-Video
1991	The Borrower	Julius	
1991	Whore	Rasta	
1992	Maid for Each Other	Eddie Kemper	TV film
1993	Percy & Thunder	Spider	TV film
1995	Soul Survivors	Leroy James	TV film
1996	Don't Be a Menace to South Central While Drinking Your Juice in the Hood	Old School	
1997	Levitation	Otis Hill	
1997	Gator King	Santos Lobilita	
1998	Milo	Kelso	
1999	The Suburbans	Magee	
1999	Unconditional Love	Bobby Chiclets	
2000	3 Strikes	Uncle Jim Douglas	
2000	Ali: An American Hero	Elijah Muhammad	TV film
2000	The Riff	Shoop Summers	
2001	Osmosis Jones	Chill	Voice role only
2001	Extreme Honor	Willy	
2006	Honey and Sting	The Beekeeper	Short film
2006	Vengeance	Bert	
2006	Sucka Punch	Uncle G	Short film
2007	The Caper	Lydell	
2007	Fist of the Warrior	Father Riley	
2007	Sister Sonya's Prayer Group	Bishop Titus Kingston	Direct-to-Video
2008	Bad Guys	Flappy	
2008	Sucker Punch	Baz	
2008	Abduction of Jesse Bookman	Frank Bookman	
2009	X Returns	Agent Adams	Short film
2009	Murphy's Law	Diamond Specialist	
2009	The Adventures of Umbweki	Umbweki's Father	
2010	Once Fallen	Jay	
2010	Changing Hands	Carjack Victim	
2012	Stealing Las Vegas	Mo	
2013	Silver Bells	Major Melvin Lowell	Direct-to-Video
2014	SnakeHead Swamp	William Boudreaux	TV film
2014	Popovich and the Voice of the Fabled American West	Lightfoot Legrand	
2017	Beyond Skyline	Sarge	
2017	Tom Hennessy	Willie 'Pops' Hennessy	
2021	Mister Mayfair: Shooting Paul	Charlie	
2021	Mister Mayfair: Serena's Game	Charlie	
2022	Until We Meet Again	Louie	
2023	One Year Off	Charlie Brooks	
TBC	Deep†	Dean Kirby	Filming

=== Television ===
Year	Series	Role	Notes
1971	The Bill Cosby Show	J.J.	Episode: "The Barber Shop"
1973	Police Story	Harpie	Episode: "The Ho Chi Minh Trail"
1973	Ironside	T.D. Harris	Episode: "Downhill All the Way"
1974	Sanford and Son	Sonny Cochran	Episode: "Fred Sanford, Legal Eagle"
1974	Toma		Episode: "Indictment"
1974	Police Woman	Rex	Episode: "The Beautiful Die Young"
1974	Kolchak: The Night Stalker	Sweetstick Weldon	Episode: "The Zombie"
1974	Kojak	Benny	Episode: "Loser Takes All"
1975–1979	Starsky & Hutch	Huggy Bear	Series regular, 92 episodes
1978	The Love Boat	Lee Graham	Episode: "Pacific Princess Overtures/Gopher, the Rebel/Cabin Fever"
1978	Vega$	'Fast' Freddie Tibbs	Episode: "Mother Mishkin"
1978	Kaz		Episode: "Which Side Are You On?"
1979	Sweepstakes		Episode: "Cowboy, Linda and Angie, Mark"
1979	CHiPs	Self	Episode: "Roller Disco: Part 2"
1980	Charlie's Angels	Blackie	Episode: "Angels of the Deep"
1981	Nurse	Marshall Gripps	Episode: "Long Days Journey Into Morning"
1982–1987	All My Children	Les Baxter	Recurring role
1983	Hardcastle and McCormick	Jerry Blackmore	Episode: "Once Again with Vigorish"
1988	Miami Vice	Alejandro Gutierrez	Episode: "Mirror Image"
1990	La belle Anglaise	Caldwell	Episode: "Weekend Surprise"
1991	MacGyver	Colonel Devraux	Episode: "Walking Dead"
1994	The Fresh Prince of Bel-Air	Lamont Kelly	Episode: "Soooooooul Train"
1995	Martin	Antonio Fargas aka Huggy Bear	Episode: "All the Players Came"
1996	The Parent 'Hood	The Criminal	Episode: "We Don't Need Another Hero"
1996	The Wayans Bros.	Uncle Nate	Episode: "Family Business"
1996	Homeboys in Outer Space	Dolomoth	Episode: "Super Bad Foxy Lady Killer or Ty and Morris Get the Shaft"
1997	Living Single	Otis Jones	2 episodes
1998	Damon	Sammy	Episode: "A Bury Special Episode"
1999	The Steve Harvey Show	Smitty Rollins	Episode: "All That Jazz"
1999	L.A. Heat	Jeremy Lauren	Episode: "Obsession"
2000	G vs E	Dutch Simms	Episode: "Renunciation"
2002	Fastlane	Jimmy Lipps	Episode: "Girls Own Juice"
2003	Holby City	Victor Garrison	Episode: "Seasons in the Sun"
2003	Grease Monkeys	Tony	Episode: "The Drugs Don't Work"
2003	The District	J.T.	Episode: "In God We Trust"
2004	Eve	Uncle Jerry	Episode: "Pimps Up, DivaStyle Down"
2005	Everybody Hates Chris	Sweet Tooth	Episode: "Everybody Hates Halloween"
2006	The Simpsons	Huggy Bear (Voice)	Episode: "Bart Has Two Mommies"
2006-2009	Everybody Hates Chris	Doc	Recurring role, 23 episodes
2008	Numb3rs	Jeffrey Knight	Episode: "Thirty-Six Hours"
2009	Lie to Me	Mr. Mitchell	Episode: "Unchained"
2009	Brothers	Maurice	Episode: "Snoop Returns"
2014	House of Lies	Mr. Zhang	Episode: "Zhang"
2016	Dark Memories	Isum	Episode: "Death at Sunrise"
2017	Mann & Wife	Lieutenant Lou	Episode: "Mann, Shut Yo Mouth"
2018	Cherif	Huggy Bear	Episode: "Quand Cherif rencontre Huggy"
2018	Black Lightning	David Poe	Episode: "And Then the Devil Brought the Plague: The Book of Green Light"
2018	Code Black	Harold	Episode: "Home Stays Home"
2024	Everybody Still Hates Chris	Doc Harris (voice role)	Episode: "Everybody Still Hates the GED"

== See also ==
- List of Afro-Latinos
- List of Puerto Ricans
