= Model Behaviour =

Model Behaviour or Model Behavior may refer to:

- "Model Behaviour", short story in the collection The Longest Night
- Model Behavior (film), a 1982 American romantic-comedy film
- Model Behavior, a 2000 television movie starring Maggie Lawson, Justin Timberlake, and Kathie Lee Gifford
- Model Behaviour (TV series), UK Channel 4 series, 2001–2002

== See also ==
- Behavior model
- Behavior modeling
