= Fantasy (Appleton song) =

2002 single by Appleton

Single by Appleton

from the album Everything's Eventual
- Released: September 2, 2002
- Studio: Riff Raff
- Genre: Pop rock
- Length: 3:44
- Label: Polydor
- Songwriter: Andy Hayman
- Producer: Gareth Young

Appleton singles chronology
"Fantasy" (2002)	"Don't Worry" (2003)

"Fantasy" is a song by Canadian pop duo Appleton. It was released as their debut single on September 2, 2002, and peaked at number two on the UK Singles Chart. Elsewhere, it reached the top 40 in Ireland, Italy, the Netherlands, and Switzerland.

== Background ==
Between 1996 and 2001, sisters Nicole and Natalie Appleton were members of the girl group All Saints. After the band's break-up, the sisters formed the duo Appleton and signed to Polydor Records. Producer Gareth Young sent Appleton a demo of "Fantasy", written by Andy Hayman, and they recorded the track at his house.

== Music video ==
The music video was directed by Jason Smith. It is set during a performance in a bar, interspersed with scenes of a couple kissing and later having sex, as well as a barfight which is broken up by security. At the final pre-chorus, Natalie stage dives into the audience; originally Nicole was supposed to do it, but she chickened out at the last moment—with the excuse that they didn't put down the mattress—and her sister had to show her how it was done. Appleton didn't have an idea for the song except that they wanted to do it live and recorded it on the spot.

There is another version of the video with an alternate ending, showing Natalie and Nicole walking down a subway after the gig discussing the fight that broke out.

== Track listings ==
UK CD1
1.	"Fantasy"	3.46
2.	"All Grown Up"	4.22
3.	"Blow My Mind"	3.46
4.	"Fantasy" (video)	3.46
UK CD2
1.	"Fantasy"	3.46
2.	"Fantasy" (Thick Dick Fantasy vocal edit)	5.38
3.	"Fantasy" (Tom Mandolini vocal edit)	5.27
4.	"Fantasy" (Harry's Afro Hut Spilt Rubber edit)	4.50
UK cassette single
1.	"Fantasy"	3.46
2.	"All Grown Up"	4.22

== Credits and personnel ==
- Natalie Appleton – vocals
- Nicole Appleton – vocals
- Andrew Hayman – music, lyrics
- Gareth Young – music, guitar, bass guitar, production
- Matt Exelby – guitar
- Lucy Rowe – backing vocals

== Charts ==
=== Weekly charts ===
Chart (2002)	Peak position
Australia (ARIA)	56
Belgium (Ultratip Bubbling Under Flanders)	7
Europe (Eurochart Hot 100)	16
Ireland (IRMA)	15
Italy (FIMI)	29
Netherlands (Dutch Top 40)	39
Netherlands (Single Top 100)	65
Scotland Singles (OCC)	2
Switzerland (Schweizer Hitparade)	39
UK Singles (OCC)	2

=== Year-end charts ===
Chart (2002)	Position
UK Singles (OCC)	154

== Release history ==
Region	Date	Format(s)	Label(s)	Ref(s).
United Kingdom	September 2, 2002	CD; cassette	Polydor	
Australia	September 16, 2002	CD	Polydor	
