= Honest (film) =

- Poster
- Directed by: David A. Stewart
- Written by: Dick Clement; Ian La Frenais; David A. Stewart; Karen Lee Street
- Produced by: Dick Clement; Ian La Frenais
- Starring: Nicole Appleton; Natalie Appleton; Melanie Blatt
- Cinematography: David Johnson
- Edited by: David Martin
- Music by: David A. Stewart
- Production companies: Honest Productions Limited; Seven Dials; Pandora Cinema; Pathé
- Distributed by: Pathé Distribution
- Release date: 26 May 2000
- Running time: 105 minutes
- Countries: United Kingdom; France
- Language: English
- Budget: £3 million

Honest is a drama crime film released in 2000. The film was the directorial debut of ex-Eurythmics member Dave Stewart and starred Peter Facinelli and three members of the British/Canadian girl group All Saints: Melanie Blatt and sisters Nicole and Natalie Appleton.

== Plot ==
The plot follows the antics of three gun-toting, streetwise, saucy sisters in Swinging London in the late 1960s.

== Reception ==
Honest received unfavourable reviews with one critic remarking, "It is the worst kind of rubbish, the kind that makes you angry you have wasted 105 minutes of your life." Peter Bradshaw noted that Honest "subscribes to the usual credulous fictions about the charm, glamour and wit of violent criminals, and leaves out these qualities in spades" and added "However silly and implausible, it would be all right if there was the slightest hint of brio or fun in the script, written by comedy giants Dick Clement and Ian La Frenais. But there isn't". The Scottish Daily Record went so far as to state that "This turgid tale of Sixties London isn't just bad - it's quite probably the worst film ever" and added "And Honest is being tipped for a slot in Hollywood's hall of shame, ranked alongside duffs like Waterworld and The Avengers". However, the Sunday Times gave it 4 stars and called it a "cult classic" à la Amazon Women on the Moon. The film was screened out of competition at the 2000 Cannes Film Festival.

The low budget (£3 million) film flopped in its opening weekend in the UK, grossing only £111,309 on 220 screens.

British film historian I.Q. Hunter, discussing the issue of "What is the worst British film ever made?", listed Honest as one of the candidates for that title.

== Cast ==
- Nicole Appleton as Gerry Chase
- Natalie Appleton as Mandy Chase
- Melanie Blatt as Jo Chase
- Peter Facinelli as Daniel Wheaton
- Jonathan Cake as Andrew Pryce-Stevens
- Rick Warden as Baz
- Annette Badland as Rose
- Corin Redgrave as Duggie
- Matt Bardock as Cedric
- Willie Ross as Woodbine
- Derek Deadman as Night Watchman
- Naima Belkhiati as Body Painted Girl
