= Sucker Punch (2008 film) =

- Film poster
- Directed by: Malcolm Martin
- Written by: Malcolm Martin
- Produced by: Joe Long
- Starring: Danny John-Jules; Gordon Alexander; Tom Hardy; Antonio Fargas; Ian Freeman
- Release date: 26 April 2008 (Fighting Spirit Film Festival)
- Running time: 92 minutes
- Country: United Kingdom

Sucker Punch is a 2008 action film written and directed by Malcolm Martin and starring Danny John-Jules, Gordon Alexander, Tom Hardy, Antonio Fargas and Ian Freeman.

It is about a bare-knuckle fighter who teams up with a small-time con artist involved in the underworld of backstreet boxers.
