= The Masked Singer (British TV series) series 4 =

Season of television series

The Masked Singer
- Series 4
- Starring: Mo Gilligan; Davina McCall; Rita Ora; Jonathan Ross
- Hosted by: Joel Dommett
- No. of contestants: 12
- Winner: Charlie Simpson as "Rhino"
- Runner-up: Ricky Wilson as "Phoenix"
- No. of episodes: 8

Release
- Original network: ITV
- Original release: 1 January – 18 February 2023

Series chronology
- ← Previous; Series 3 Next → Series 5

The fourth series of the British version of The Masked Singer premiered on ITV on 1 January 2023, and concluded on 18 February 2023. The series was won by singer Charlie Simpson as "Rhino", with singer Ricky Wilson finishing second as "Phoenix", and singer Natalie Appleton placing third as "Fawn".

== Production ==
On 14 February 2022, following the conclusion of the third series, ITV announced the commissioning of a fourth and fifth series. Filming for the series took place in October 2022.

== Panellists and host ==
Series 4 panellists and host

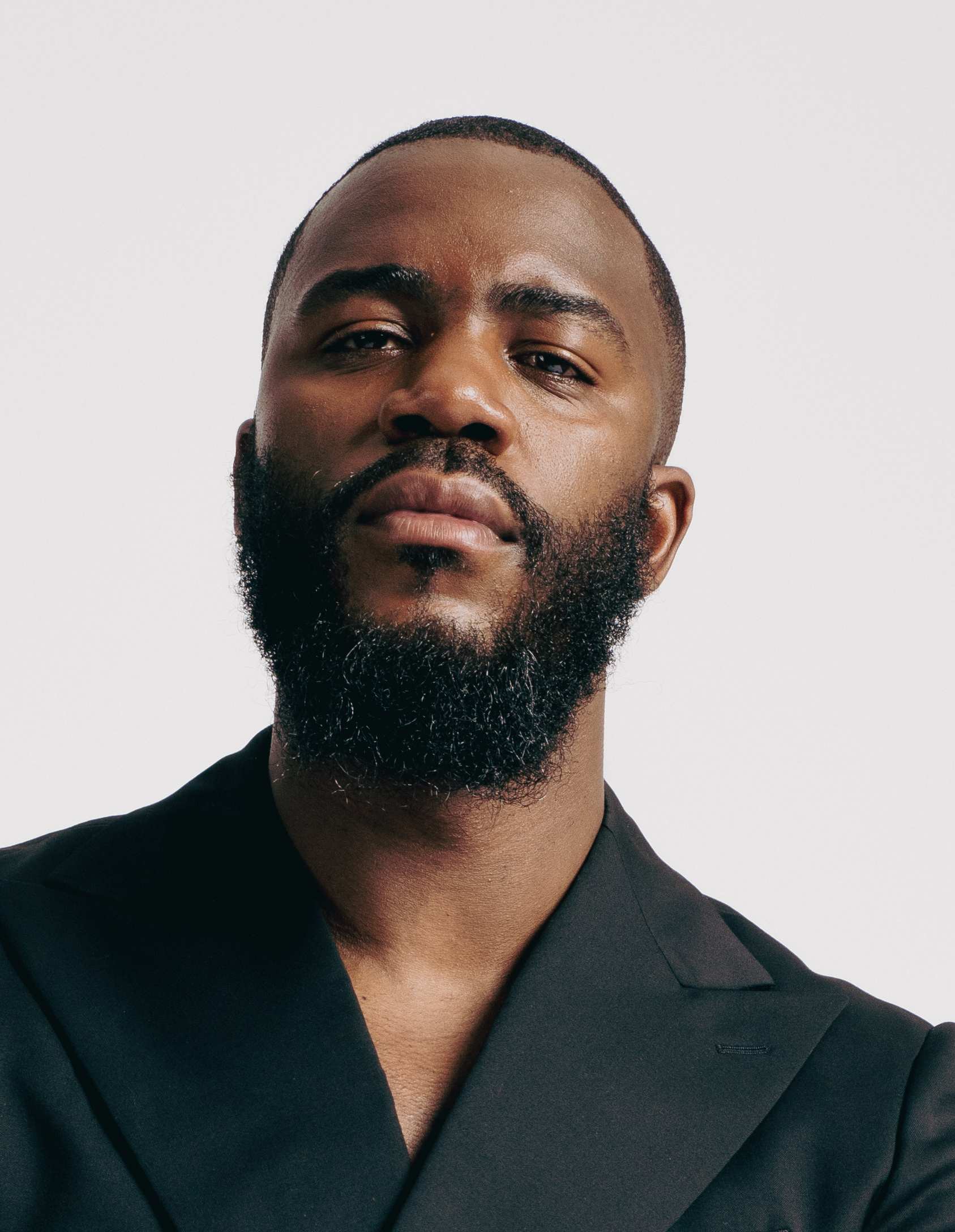
Mo Gilligan

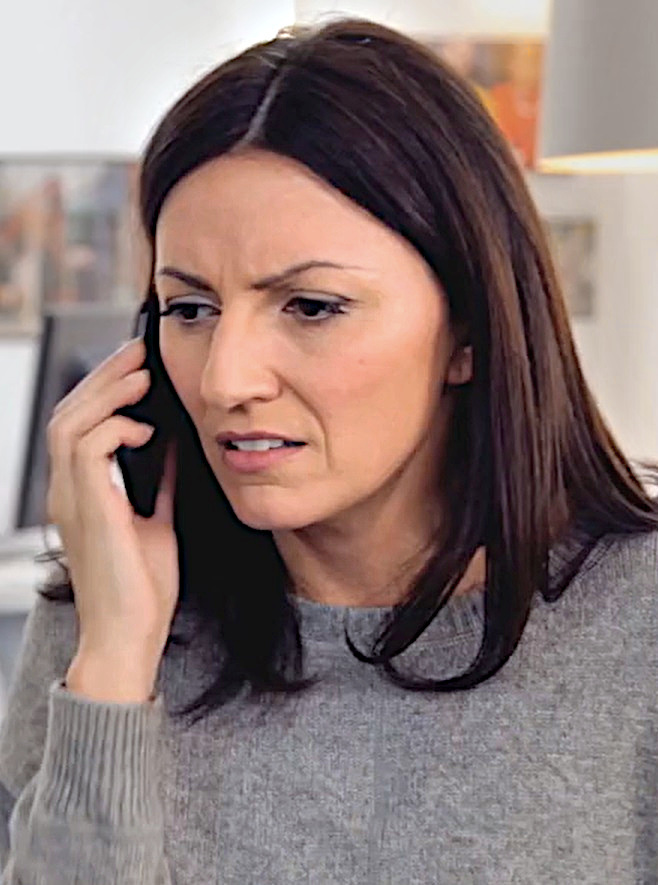
Davina McCall

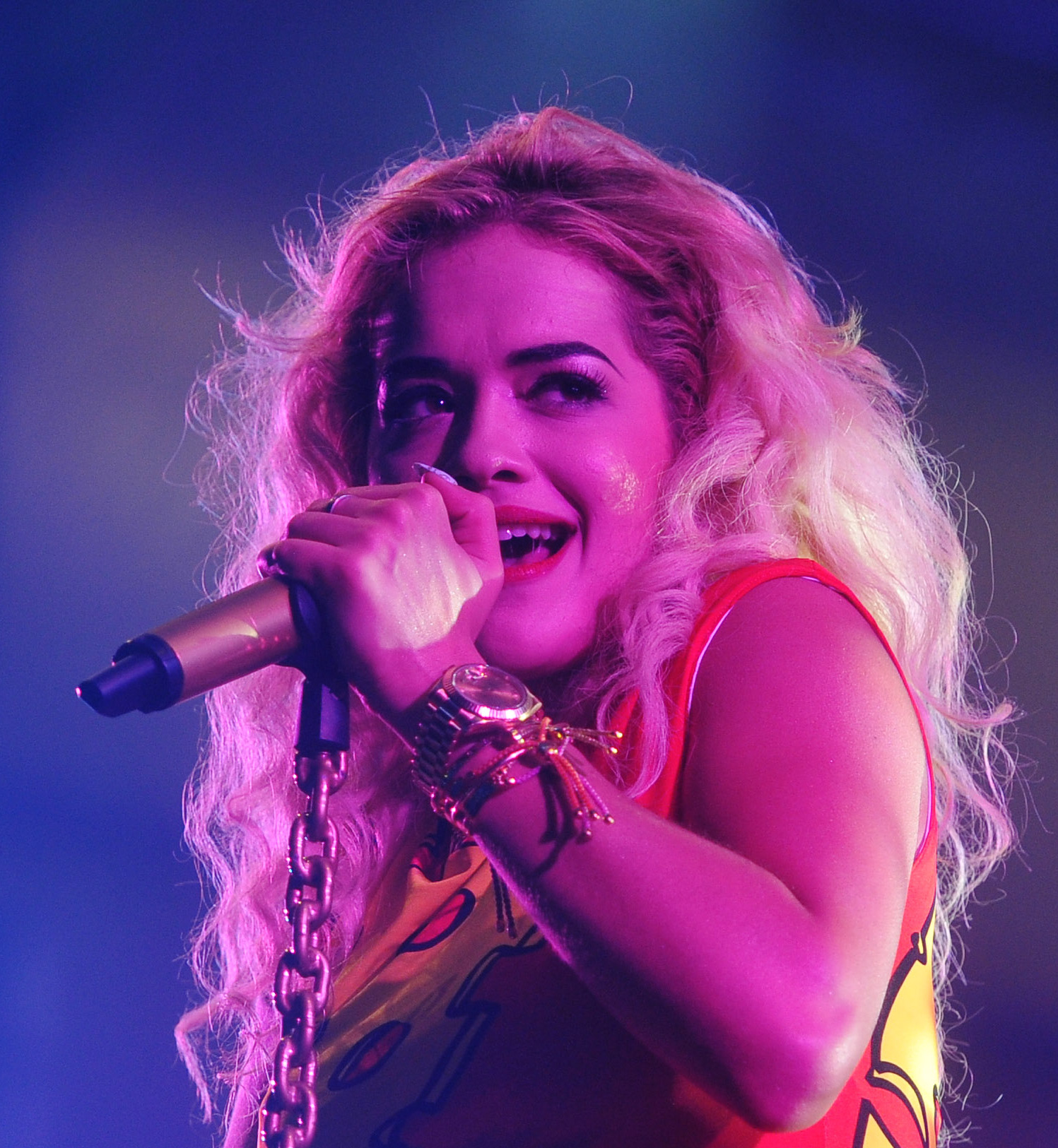
Rita Ora

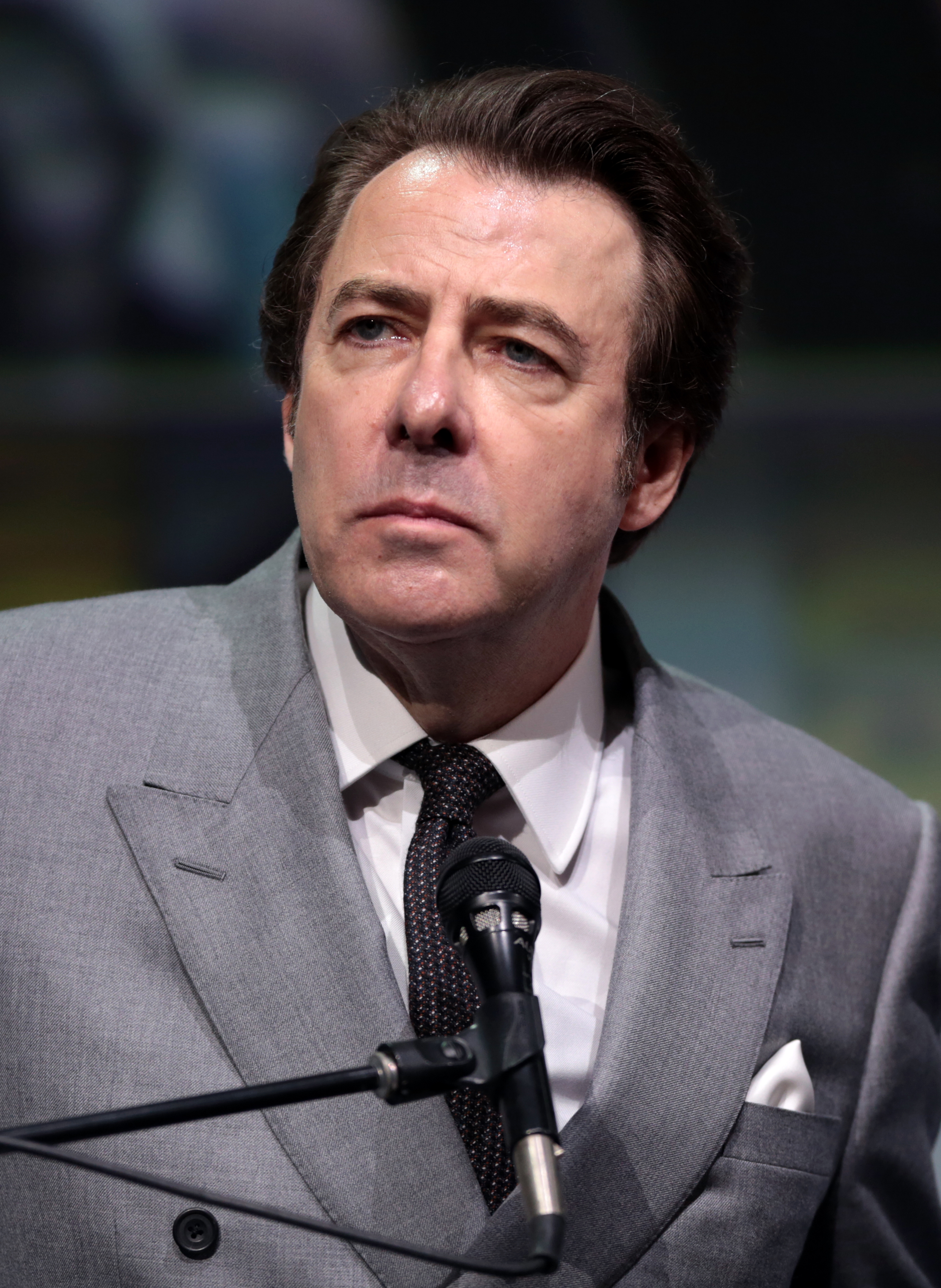
Jonathan Ross

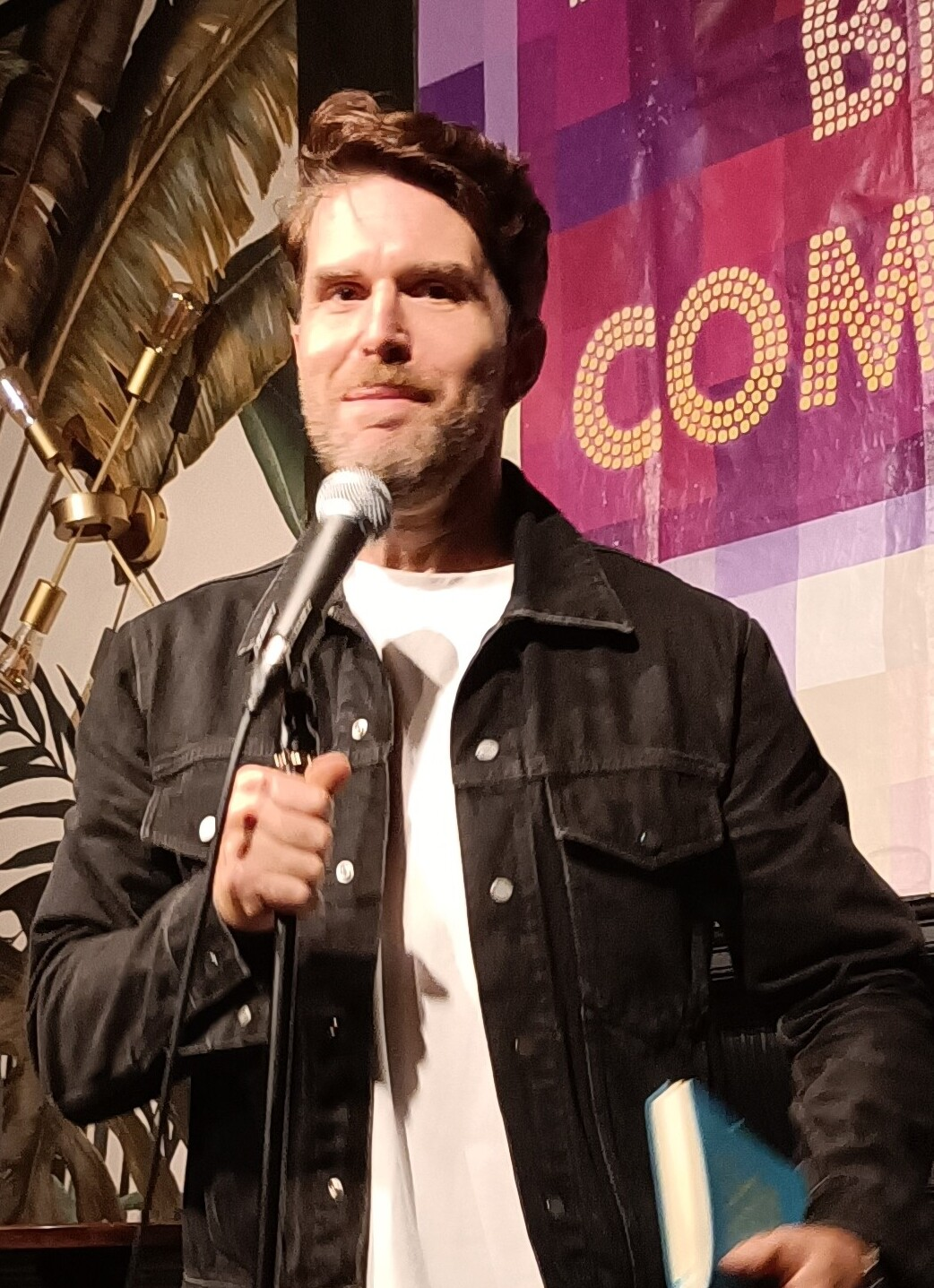
Joel Dommett

Following the series' commissioning, it was confirmed that Joel Dommett would return as presenter, with Jonathan Ross, Davina McCall, Rita Ora and Mo Gilligan all returning to the panel.

Stephen Mulhern served as a guest panellist in the sixth episode, Peter Crouch, who was a panellist on the second series of The Masked Dancer, served as a guest panellist in the seventh episode, and Lee Mack served as a guest panellist in the eighth episode.

== Contestants ==
Results
Stage name	Celebrity	Occupation	Episodes							
Stage name	Celebrity	Occupation	1	2	3	4	5	6	7	8
Rhino	Charlie Simpson	Singer		WIN		SAFE	SAFE	SAFE	SAFE	WINNER
Phoenix	Ricky Wilson	Singer	WIN		SAFE		SAFE	SAFE	SAFE	RUNNER-UP
Fawn	Natalie Appleton	Singer		WIN		SAFE	SAFE	RISK	SAFE	THIRD
Jellyfish	Amber Riley	Actress/singer	WIN		SAFE		SAFE	SAFE	OUT	
Jacket Potato	Richie Sambora	Musician		RISK		RISK	RISK	SAFE	OUT	
Otter	Daisy May Cooper	Actress	WIN		SAFE		SAFE	OUT		
Knitting	Claire Richards	Singer	RISK		RISK		SAFE	OUT		
Pigeon	Katherine Ryan	Comedian		WIN		SAFE	OUT			
Rubbish	Stephen Hendry	Snooker player		RISK		OUT				
Cat & Mouse	Martin Kemp	Actor/musician	RISK		OUT					
Cat & Mouse	Shirlie Kemp	Singer	RISK		OUT					
Piece of Cake	Lulu	Singer		OUT						
Ghost	Chris Kamara	Footballer/TV presenter	OUT							

The masked singer won their face-off and remained in the competition.
The masked singer was safe from elimination.
The masked singer was in the bottom three/two, but was not eliminated.
The masked singer was eliminated from the competition and unmasked upon their elimination.
The masked singer did not perform.
The masked singer won the competition.
The masked singer finished second.
The masked singer finished third.
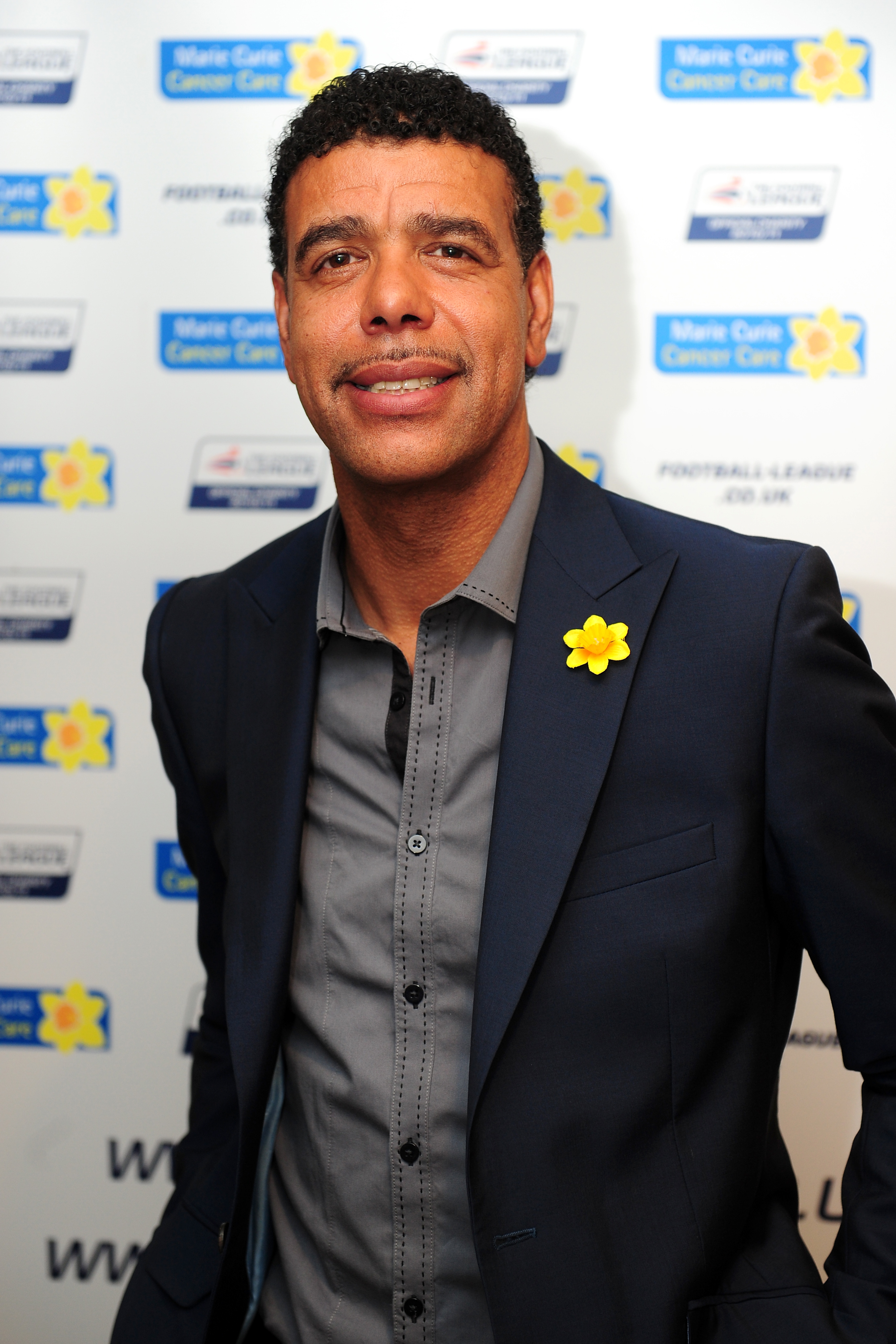
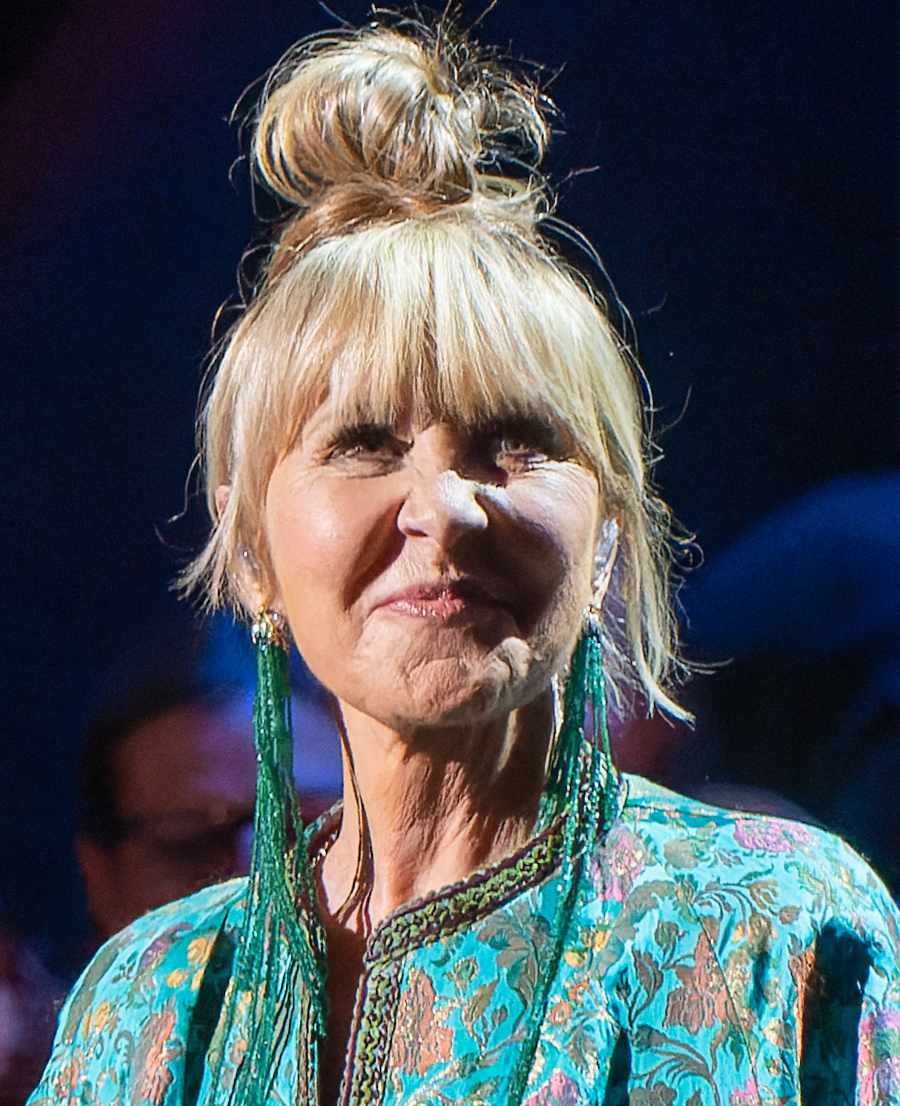
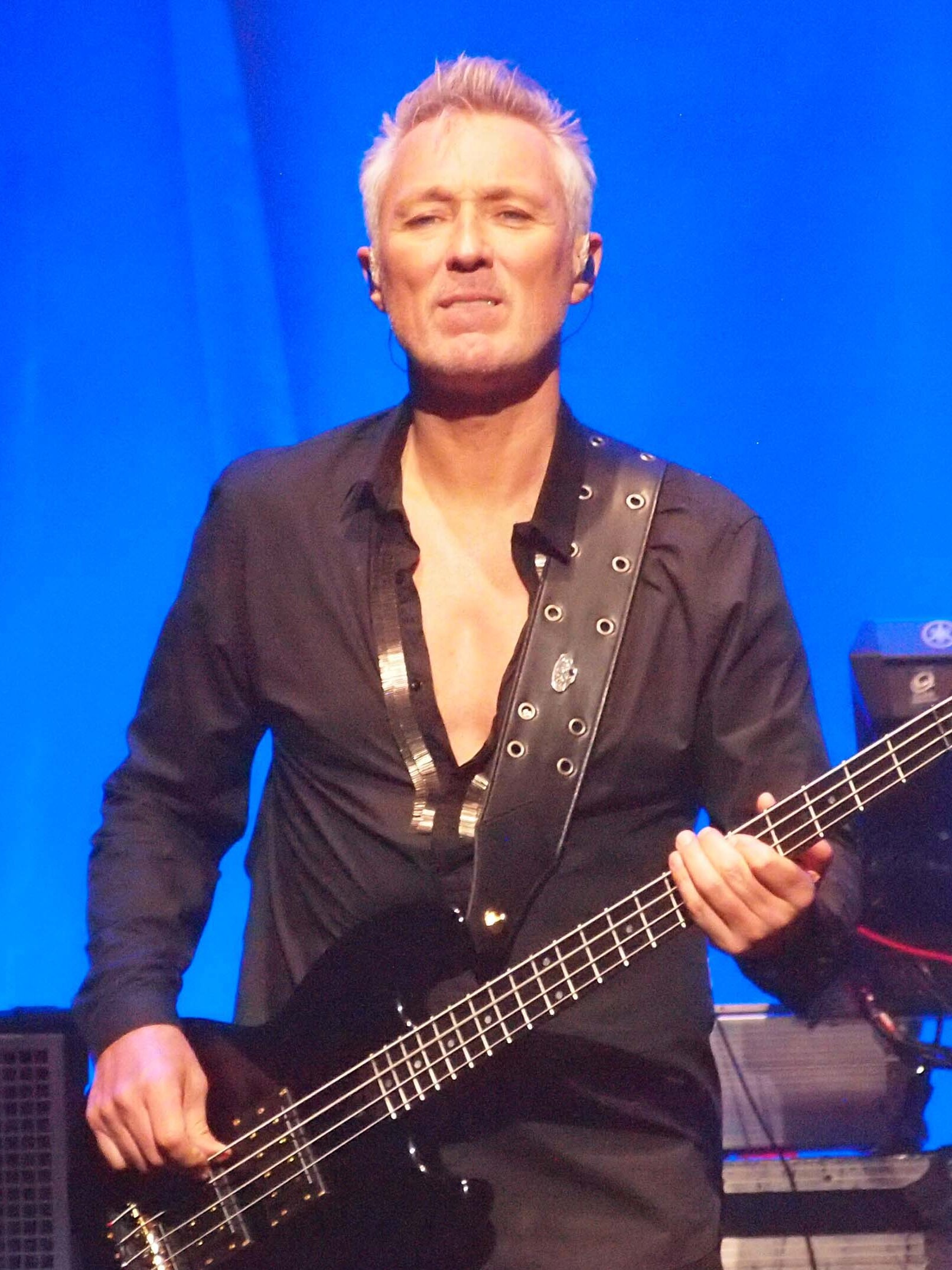
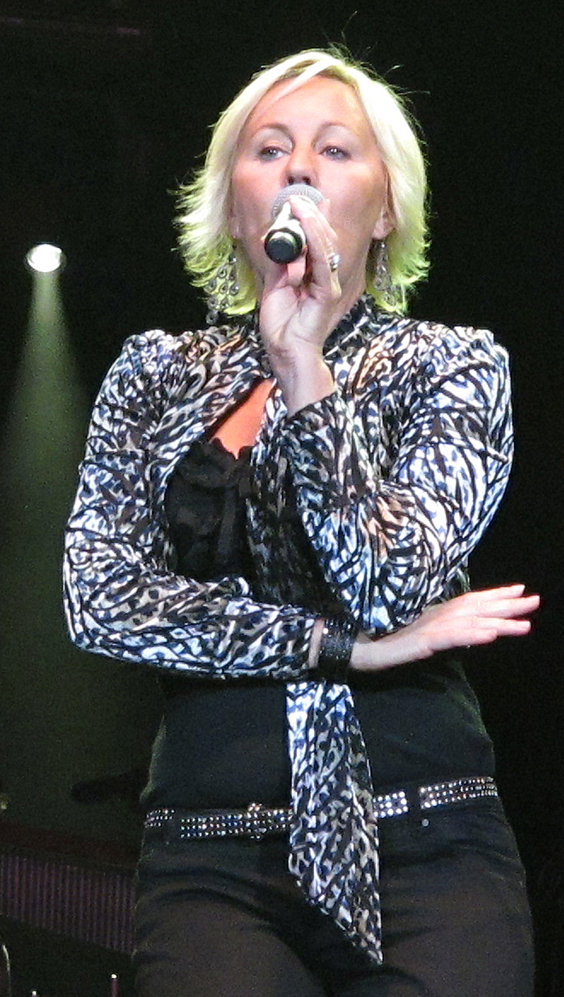
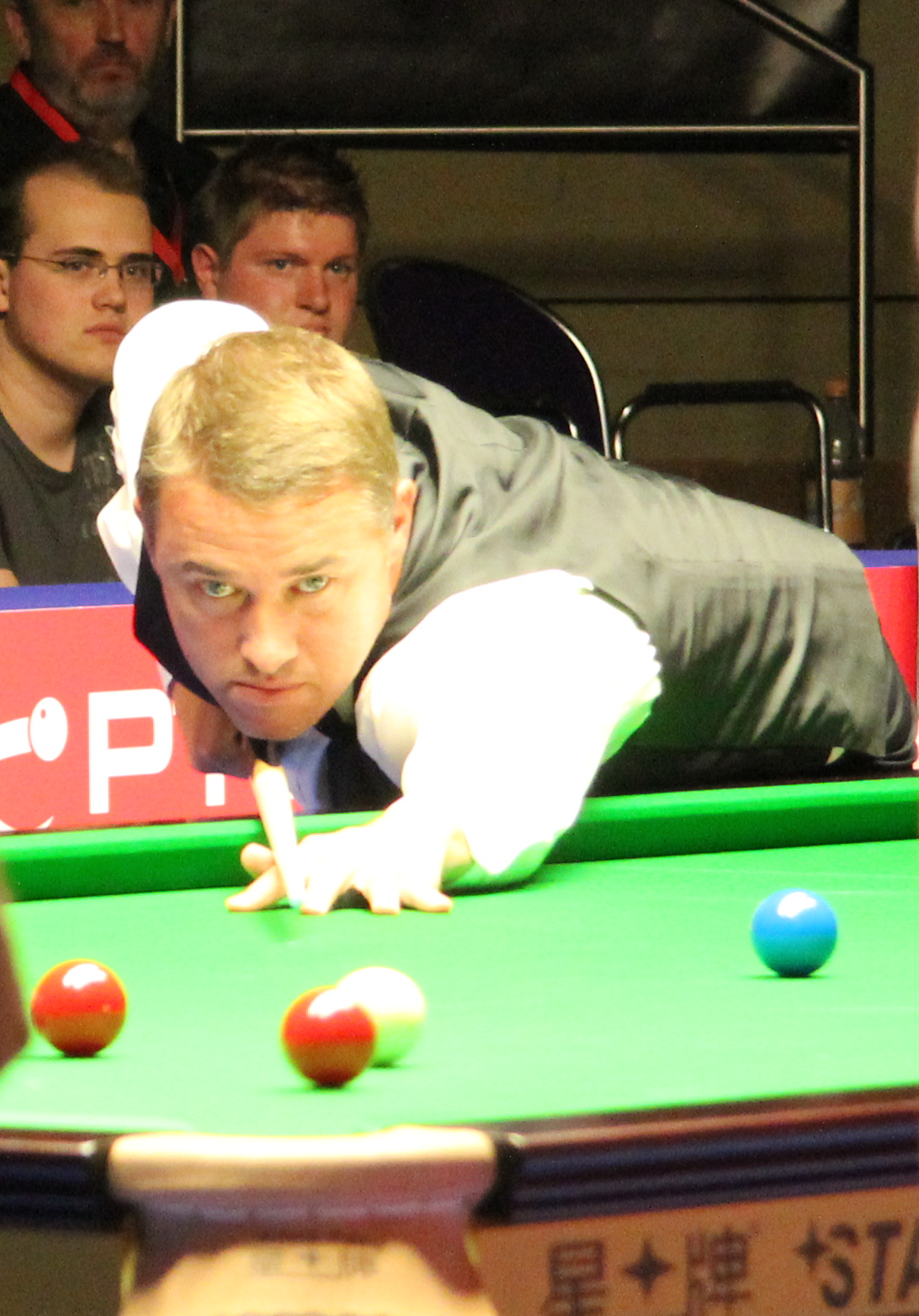
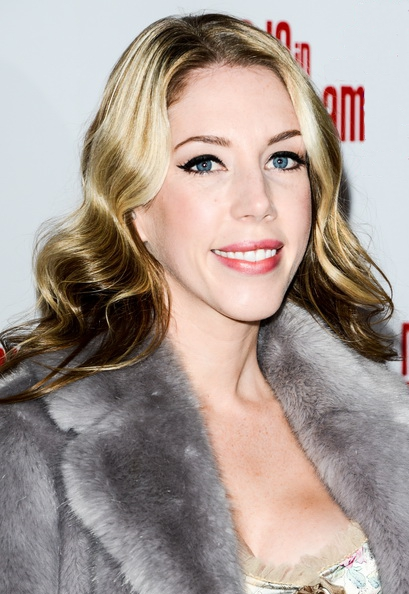
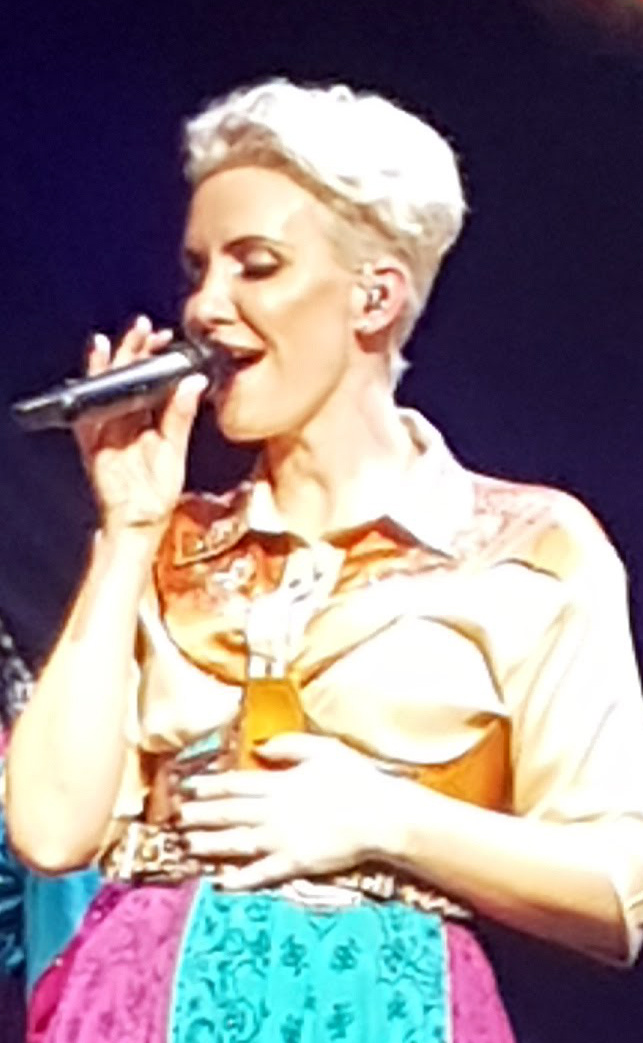
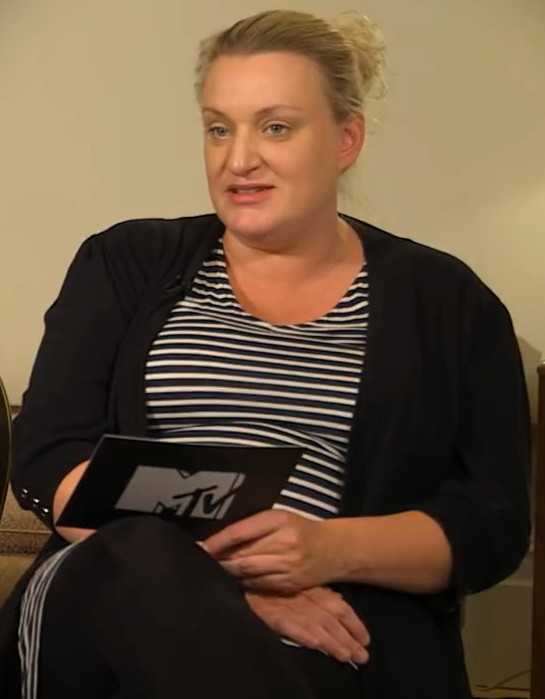
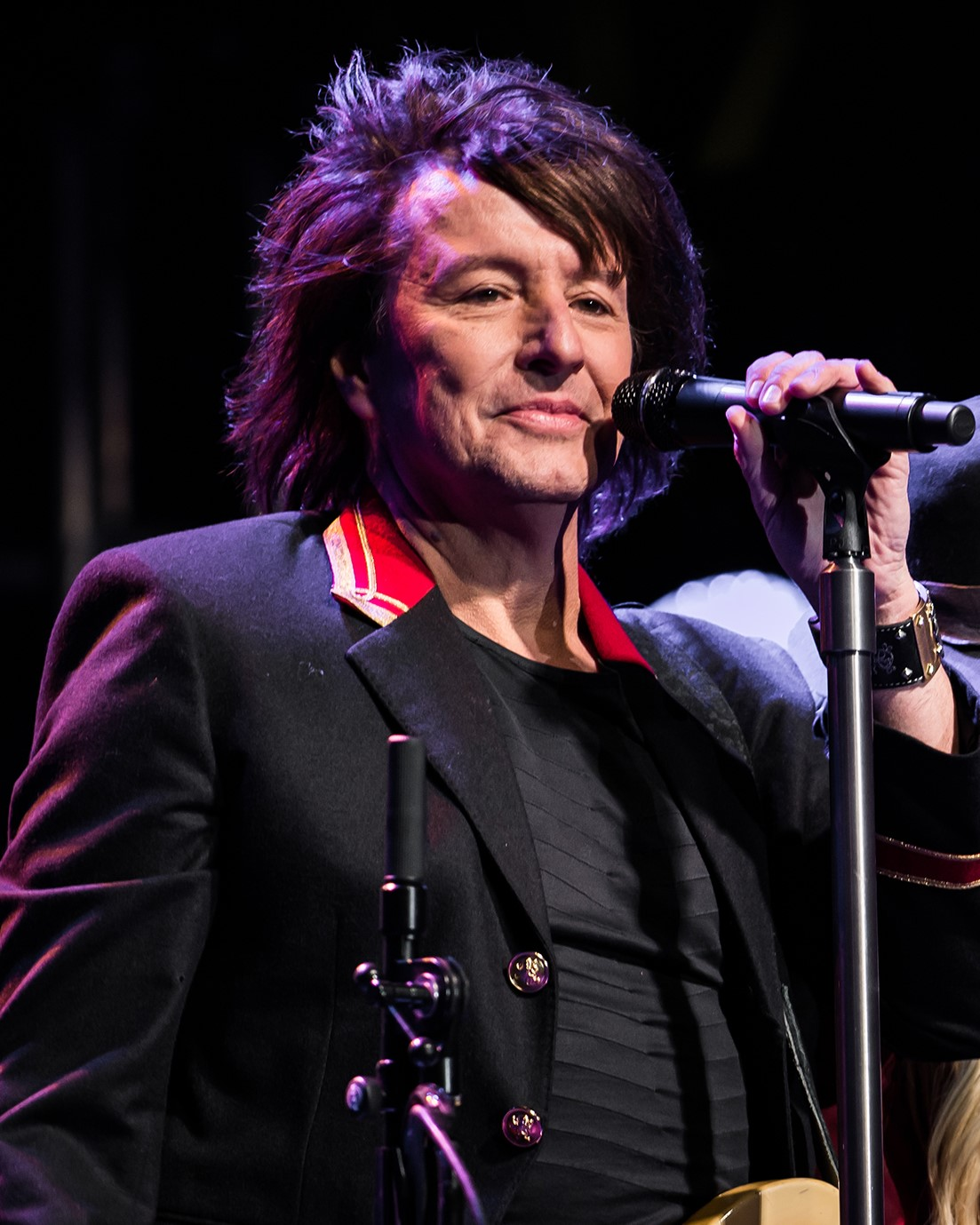
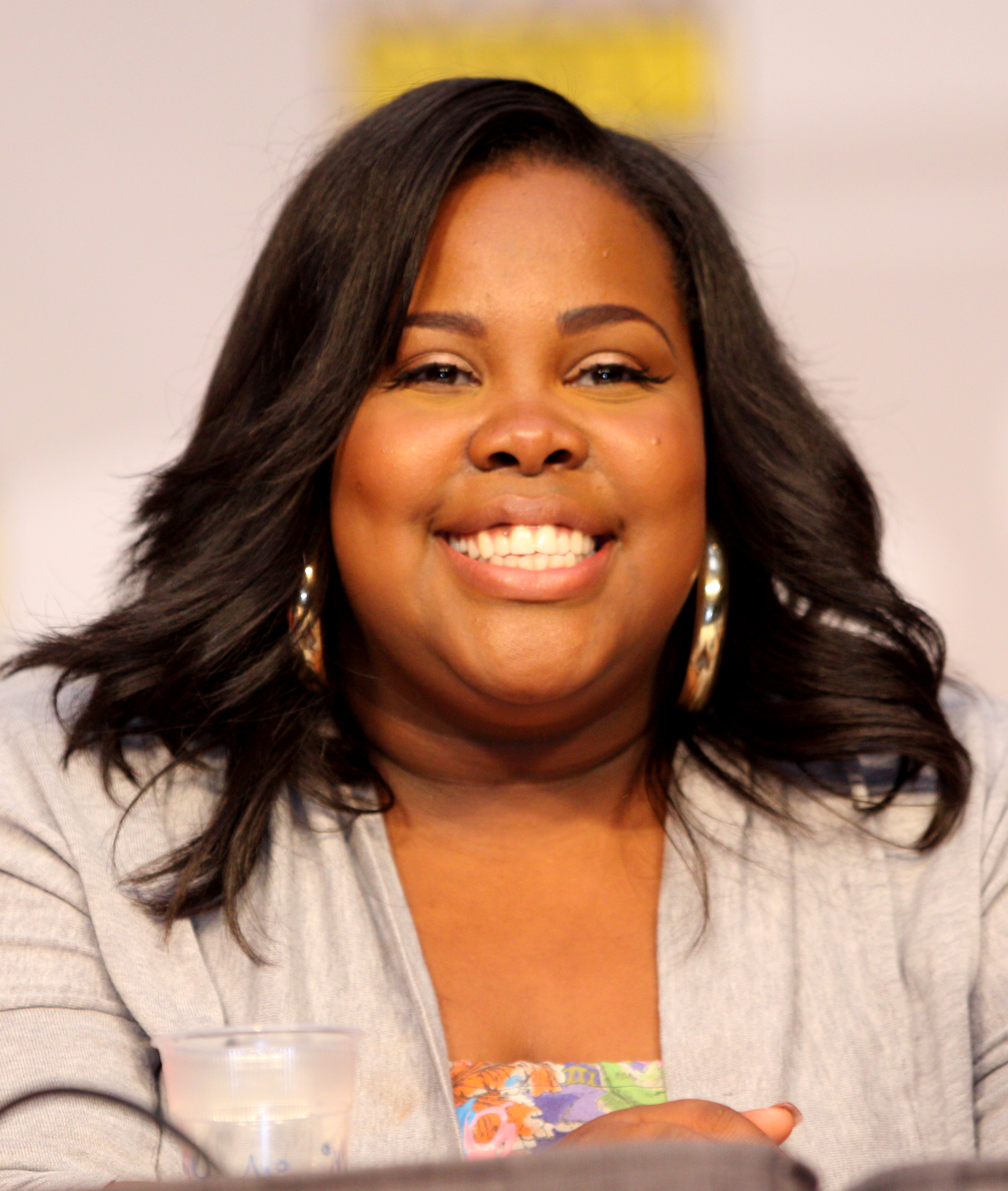
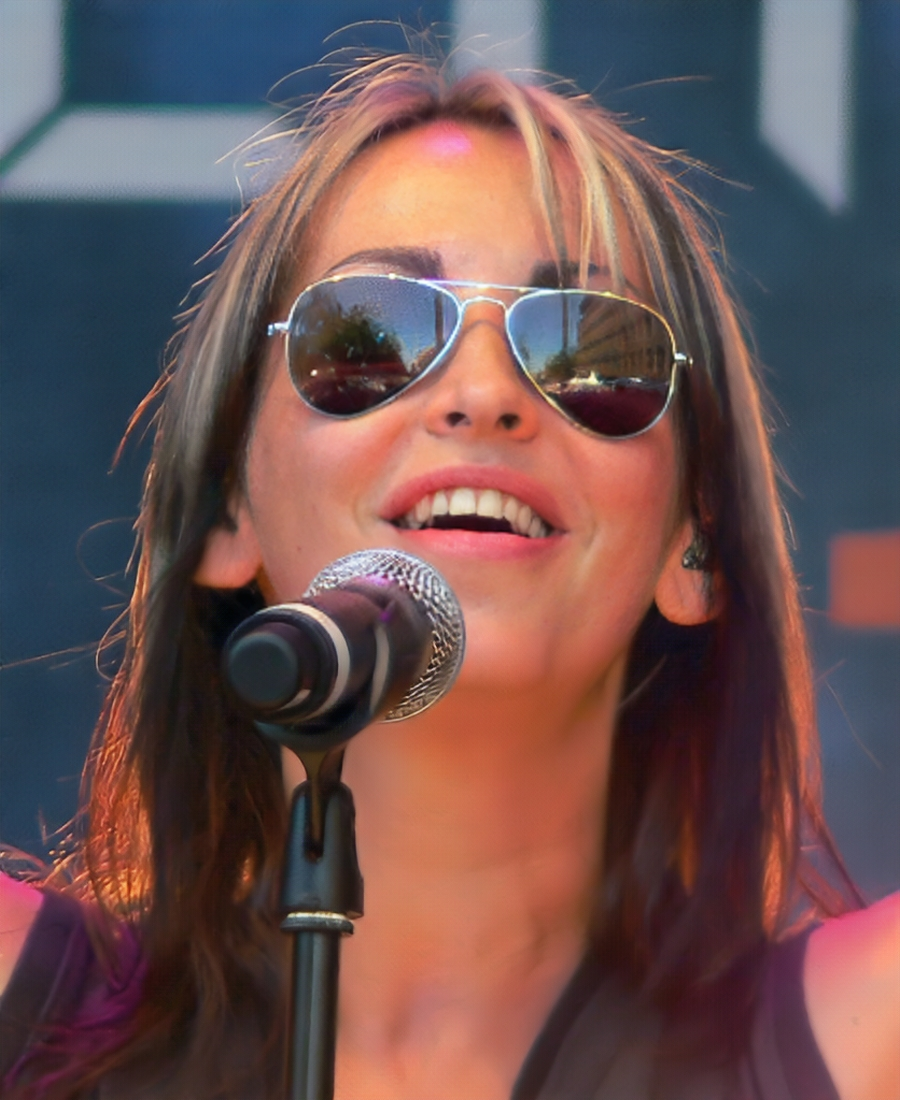
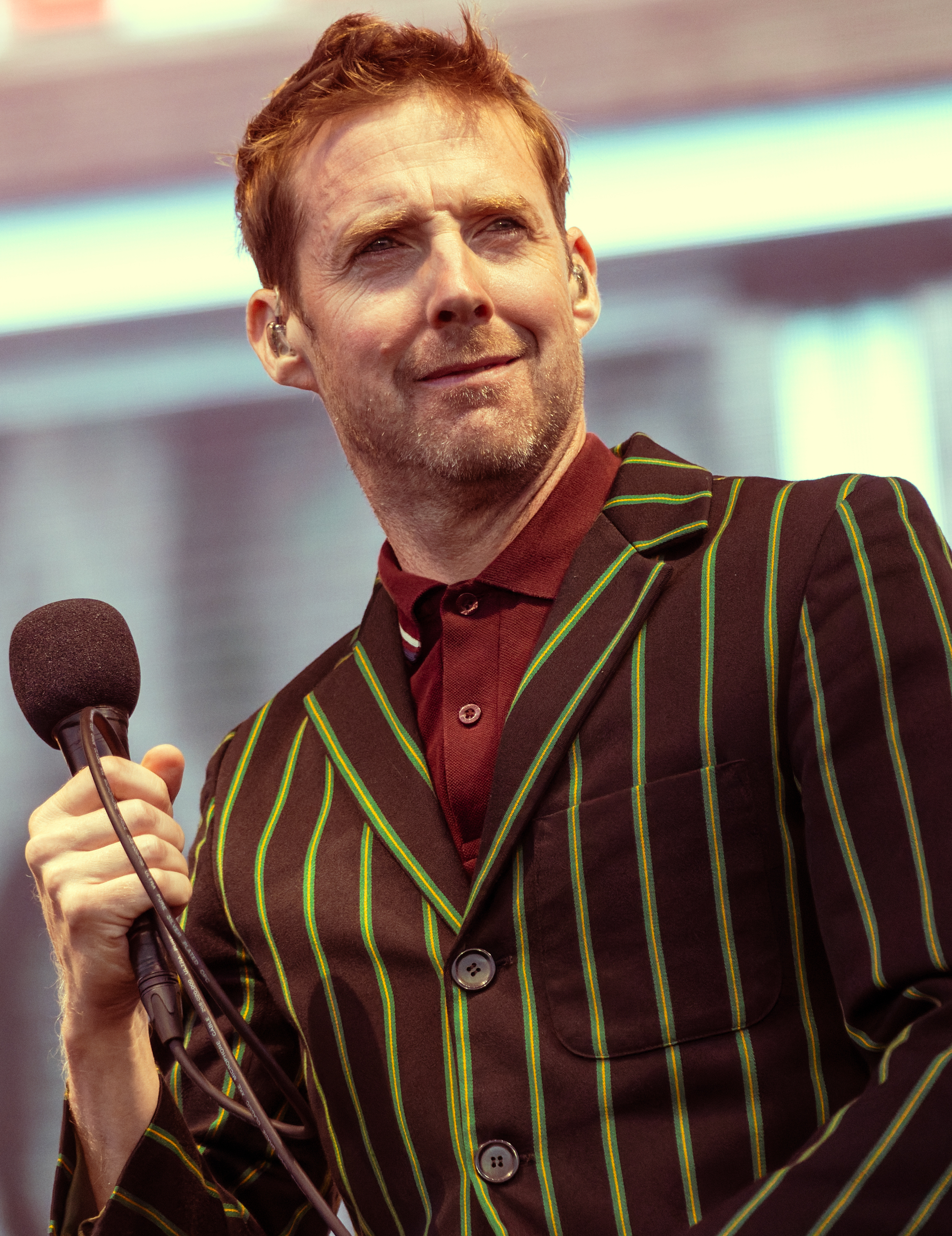
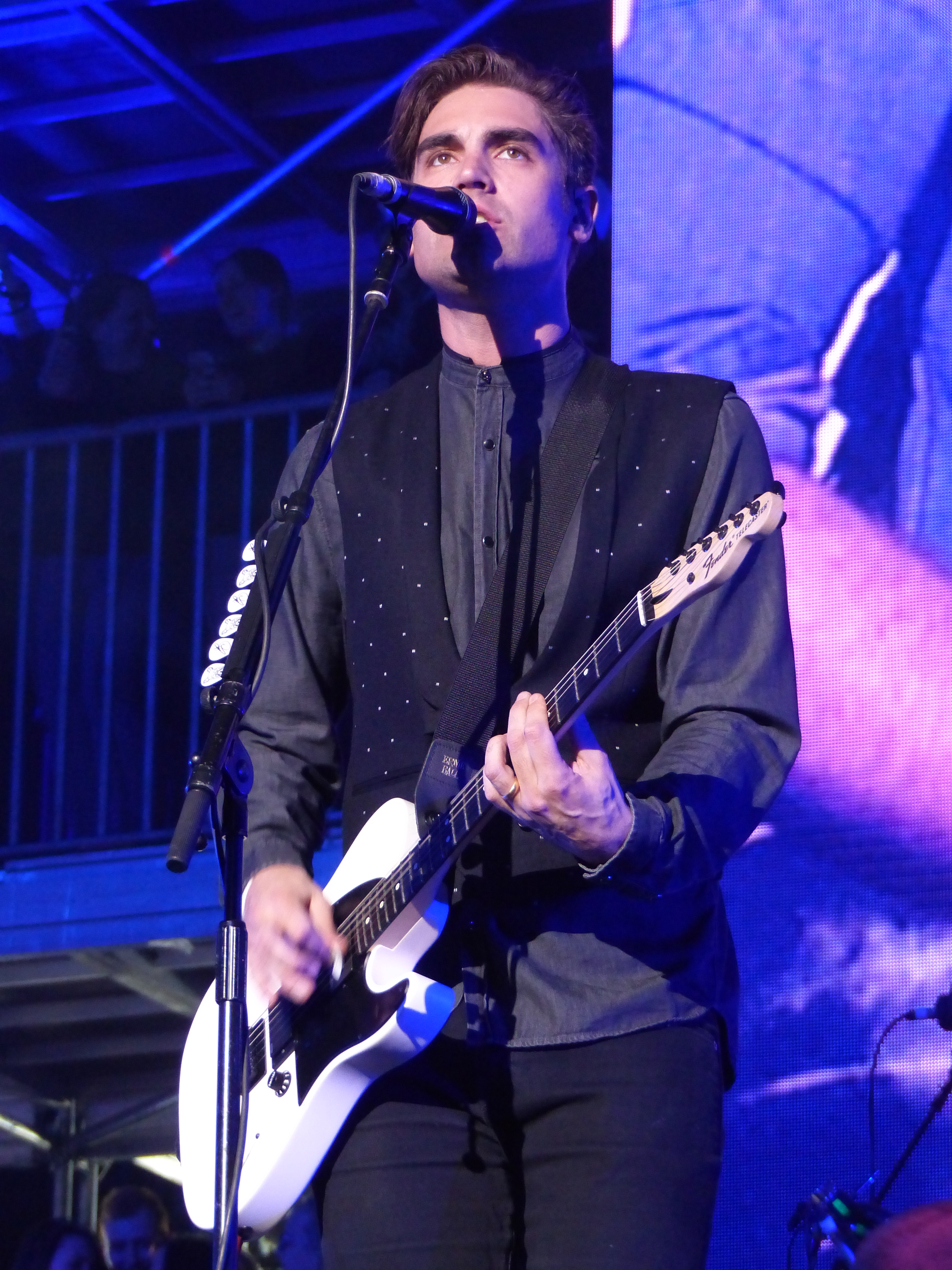
The celebrities who competed in the fourth series of The Masked Singer, pictured in order of elimination (L–R):
Chris Kamara ("Ghost"), Lulu ("Piece of Cake"), Martin & Shirlie Kemp ("Cat & Mouse"), Stephen Hendry ("Rubbish"), Katherine Ryan ("Pigeon"), Claire Richards ("Knitting"), Daisy May Cooper ("Otter"), Richie Sambora ("Jacket Potato"), Amber Riley ("Jellyfish"), Natalie Appleton ("Fawn"), Ricky Wilson ("Phoenix"), and Charlie Simpson ("Rhino")

== Episodes ==
=== Episode 1 (1 January) ===
Performances on the first episode
#	Stage name	Song	Identity	Result
1	Knitting	“Remember” by Becky Hill & David Guetta	undisclosed	RISK
2	Jellyfish	"Sweet Child o' Mine" by Guns N' Roses	undisclosed	WIN
3	Otter	"I'm Always Here" from Baywatch	undisclosed	WIN
4	Ghost	"Save the Last Dance for Me" by The Drifters	Chris Kamara	OUT
5	Cat & Mouse	"Anything You Can Do (I Can Do Better)" from Annie Get Your Gun	undisclosed	RISK
5	Cat & Mouse	"Anything You Can Do (I Can Do Better)" from Annie Get Your Gun	undisclosed	RISK
6	Phoenix	"Get Lucky" by Daft Punk ft. Pharrell Williams & Nile Rodgers	undisclosed	WIN

=== Episode 2 (7 January) ===
Performances on the second episode
#	Stage name	Song	Identity	Result
1	Jacket Potato	"Viva Las Vegas" by Elvis Presley	undisclosed	RISK
2	Fawn	"Beauty and the Beast" from Beauty and the Beast	undisclosed	WIN
3	Rubbish	"Let Me Entertain You" by Robbie Williams	undisclosed	RISK
4	Pigeon	"No Scrubs" by TLC	undisclosed	WIN
5	Piece of Cake	"Shivers" by Ed Sheeran	Lulu	OUT
6	Rhino	"Chasing Cars" by Snow Patrol	undisclosed	WIN

=== Episode 3 (14 January) ===
- Theme: Time Machine
- Group number: "About Damn Time" by Lizzo

Performances on the third episode
#	Stage name	Song	Decade	Result
1	Jellyfish	"Take Me to Church" by Hozier	2010s	SAFE
2	Cat & Mouse	"Get Happy" from Summer Stock	1950s	RISK
3	Phoenix	"Loco in Acapulco" by Four Tops	1980s	SAFE
4	Otter	"Reflection" from Mulan	1990s	SAFE
5	Knitting	"No More Tears (Enough Is Enough)" by Barbra Streisand & Donna Summer	1970s	RISK
Sing-Off			Identity	Result
1	Cat & Mouse	"There's Nothing Holdin' Me Back" by Shawn Mendes	Martin Kemp	OUT
1	Cat & Mouse	"There's Nothing Holdin' Me Back" by Shawn Mendes	Shirlie Kemp	OUT
2	Knitting	"Memory" from Cats	undisclosed	SAFE

=== Episode 4 (21 January) ===
- Theme: Cluefest
- Group number: "Viva la Vida" by Coldplay

Performances on the fourth episode
#	Stage name	Song	Result	
1	Rubbish	"Ruby" by Kaiser Chiefs	RISK	
2	Fawn	"Into the Groove" by Madonna	SAFE	
3	Rhino	"Try" by P!nk	SAFE	
4	Pigeon	"Yeah!" by Usher ft. Lil Jon & Ludacris	SAFE	
5	Jacket Potato	"Hallelujah" by Leonard Cohen	RISK	
Sing-Off			Identity	Result
1	Rubbish	"My Old Man's a Dustman" by Lonnie Donegan	Stephen Hendry	OUT
2	Jacket Potato	"Brass in Pocket" by The Pretenders	undisclosed	SAFE

=== Episode 5 (28 January) ===
Performances on the fifth episode
#	Stage name	Clue song	Identity	Result
1	Phoenix	"I'm Still Standing" by Elton John	undisclosed	SAFE
2	Jellyfish	"Leave a Light On" by Tom Walker	undisclosed	SAFE
3	Otter	"9 to 5" by Dolly Parton	undisclosed	SAFE
4	Jacket Potato	"Smooth" by Carlos Santana	undisclosed	RISK
5	Knitting	"Secret Love Song" by Little Mix	undisclosed	SAFE
6	Fawn	"Ironic" by Alanis Morissette	undisclosed	SAFE
7	Pigeon	"Fight for This Love" by Cheryl	Katherine Ryan	OUT
8	Rhino	"I Just Can't Wait to Be King" from The Lion King	undisclosed	SAFE

=== Episode 6 (4 February) ===
- Guest panelist: Stephen Mulhern

Performances on the sixth episode
#	Stage name	Song	Identity	Result
1	Fawn	"Changing" by Sigma feat. Paloma Faith	undisclosed	RISK
2	Knitting	"Left Outside Alone" by Anastacia	Claire Richards	OUT
3	Otter	"Cheerleader" by Omi	Daisy May Cooper	OUT
4	Jellyfish	"Alone" by Heart	undisclosed	SAFE
5	Rhino	"Into You" by Ariana Grande	undisclosed	SAFE
6	Jacket Potato	"Go Your Own Way" by Fleetwood Mac	undisclosed	SAFE
7	Phoenix	"It's Not Unusual" by Tom Jones	undisclosed	SAFE

=== Episode 7: Semi-final (11 February) ===
- Guest panelist: Peter Crouch

First performances on the seventh episode
#	Stage name	Song	Identity	Result
1	Jellyfish	"You Give Love a Bad Name" by Bon Jovi	undisclosed	SAFE
2	Jacket Potato	"Love Me Again" by John Newman	Richie Sambora	OUT
3	Fawn	"Tomorrow" from Annie	undisclosed	SAFE
4	Phoenix	"Can't Take My Eyes Off You" by Frankie Valli	undisclosed	SAFE
5	Rhino	"Little Bit of Love" by Tom Grennan	undisclosed	SAFE

Second performances on the seventh episode
#	Stage name	Song	Identity	Result
1	Jellyfish	"Without You" by David Guetta ft. Usher	Amber Riley	OUT
2	Fawn	"Be the One" by Dua Lipa	undisclosed	SAFE
3	Phoenix	"Grace Kelly" by Mika	undisclosed	SAFE
4	Rhino	"Use Somebody" by Kings of Leon	undisclosed	SAFE

=== Episode 8: Final (18 February) ===
- Group number: "Heroes (We Could Be)" by Alesso ft. Tove Lo
- Guest panelist: Lee Mack

First performances on the eighth episode
#	Stage name	Song
1	Rhino	"Before You Go" by Lewis Capaldi
2	Fawn	"Hopelessly Devoted to You" by Olivia Newton-John
3	Phoenix	"Sway" by Dean Martin

Second performances on the eighth episode
#	Stage name	Song	Duet partner	Identity	Result
1	Rhino	"Beneath Your Beautiful" by Labrinth ft. Emeli Sandé	Gabrielle (Harlequin)	undisclosed	SAFE
2	Fawn	"When She Loved Me" by Sarah McLachlan	Aled Jones (Traffic Cone)	Natalie Appleton	THIRD PLACE
3	Phoenix	"Don't Go Breaking My Heart" by Elton John & Kiki Dee	Denise van Outen (Fox)	undisclosed	SAFE

Third performances on the eighth episode
#	Stage name	Song of the series	Identity	Result
1	Rhino	"Try" by P!nk	Charlie Simpson	WINNER
2	Phoenix	"Get Lucky" by Daft Punk ft. Pharrell Williams & Nile Rodgers	Ricky Wilson	RUNNER-UP

== Ratings ==
Official ratings were taken from BARB, utilising the four-screen dashboard which included viewers who watched the programme on laptops, smartphones, and tablets within 7 days of the original broadcast.

Episode	Date	Official 7 day rating (millions)	Weekly rank for ITV	Weekly rank for all UK TV
1	1 January	4.97	3	11
2	7 January	5.74	2	8
3	14 January	5.43	2	8
4	21 January	5.43	3	9
5	28 January	5.74	2	8
6	4 February	5.44	2	9
7	11 February	5.51	2	7
8	18 February	5.74	2	4
Series average	2023	5.50	—N/a	
