= Cover Me Canada =

- Logo
- Presented by: Nicole Appleton
- Judges: Jordan Knight; Deborah Cox; Ron Fair
- Country of origin: Canada
- No. of seasons: 1
- No. of episodes: 9

Production
- Production locations: CBC Studios, Toronto
- Production company: Temple Street Productions

Original release
- Network: CBC
- Release: September 18 – November 13, 2011

Cover Me Canada is a Canadian reality competition television series that aired on CBC Television. The show is a competition to find the most talented singer, rock band, group, or ensemble in Canada.

The show is hosted by Canadian-born pop singer Nicole Appleton and judged by Jordan Knight, Deborah Cox, and Ron Fair.

Contestants can select from four Canadian songs to cover: "Sundown" by Gordon Lightfoot, "Run to You" by Bryan Adams, "Life is a Highway" by Tom Cochrane or "Black Velvet" by Alannah Myles.

== Format ==
The original format was created and developed by Jesse Fawcett and Kevin Healey at 11 Television and then sold to CBC.

Eight contestants are chosen from video auditions and are given a Canadian song to cover and perform live. At the end of the broadcast, viewers are asked to vote and share their favourites to earn them immunity from the next week's elimination.

Votes and online buzz are both factors to decide which competitor will be granted immunity and be safe from elimination by the judges.

== Competitors ==
Artist	Origin	Eliminated
Whosarmy	Toronto, ON	Season 1 Winners
Melanie Morgan	Cap Pele, NB	Runner Up
Ali Milner	Vancouver, BC	Eliminated 6 November 2011
Warren Dean Flandez	Vancouver, BC	Eliminated 30 October 2011
Living In Red	Winnipeg, MB	Eliminated 16 October 2011
Georgia Murray	Victoria, BC	Eliminated 9 October 2011
The Simpson Brothers	Tsawwassen, BC	Eliminated 2 October 2011
G07	Toronto, ON	Eliminated 25 September 2011

== Ratings ==
Order	Date	Viewers (100,000s)
1	"September 18, 2011"	5.91
2	"September 25, 2011"	4.41
3	"October 2, 2011"	4.23
4	"October 9, 2011"	3.83
5	"October 16, 2011"	3.74
6	"October 23, 2011"	5.62
7	"October 30, 2011"	5.86
8	"November 6, 2011"	5.48
9	"November 13, 2011"	6.15
