= I'm a Celebrity...Get Me Out of Here! (British TV series) series 4 =

I'm a Celebrity...Get Me Out of Here!
- Series 4
- Presented by: Anthony McPartlin; Declan Donnelly
- No. of days: 18
- No. of castaways: 11
- Winner: Joe Pasquale
- Runner-up: Paul Burrell
- Companion show: I'm a Celebrity...Get Me Out of Here! NOW!
- No. of episodes: 18

Release
- Original network: ITV
- Original release: 21 November – 6 December 2004

Series chronology
- ← Previous; Series 3 Next → Series 5

The fourth series of I'm a Celebrity...Get Me Out of Here! began on 21 November 2004 and ended on 6 December 2004. The programme ran for 16 days, one more than in the previous series (18 days if counting the day the celebrities arrived and the morning the finalists exited). The series was won by comedian Joe Pasquale, with Paul Burrell narrowly coming second by a 2% margin. Pasquale raised £175,000 by taking part in the show and donated this to his nominated charity, Cerebral Palsy Care Centre in Rochester.

Following its completion, ITV2 broadcast a one-off pre-recorded series with Mark Durden-Smith as host that featured Australian civilians as 'guinea pig' campmates to test-run a selection of challenges and trials ahead of the main series. Instead of a viewers vote each night, I'm an Aussie... used a Bush Panel, consisting of series one runner-up Tara Palmer-Tomkinson, series two winner Phil Tufnell and the main show's resident on-screen medic Bob McCarron, to decide who would take part in these and be voted out of camp.

Burrell would compete on two further seasons of the show – first, he competed on the 4th season of the Australian version of the show, placing 9th and later competed in the first series of I'm a Celebrity...South Africa, an all-star edition of I'm a Celebrity UK. Burrell was eliminated alongside series 16 contestant Carol Vorderman, with the pair finishing joint sixth and fifth overall.

== Contestants ==
11 contestants participated, one more than in the previous two series.

Celebrity	Famous for	Status
Joe Pasquale	Comedian	Winner on 6 December 2004
Paul Burrell	Royal Household servant	Runner-up on 6 December 2004
Fran Cosgrave	Celebrity nightclub manager	Third place on 6 December 2004
Janet Street-Porter	Broadcaster & journalist	Eliminated 6th on 5 December 2004
Sophie Anderton	Model	Eliminated 5th on 3 December 2004
Antonio Fargas	Starsky & Hutch actor	Eliminated 4th on 2 December 2004
Sheila Ferguson	The Three Degrees singer	Eliminated 3rd on 1 December 2004
Vic Reeves	Vic and Bob comedian	Eliminated 2nd on 30 November 2004
Nancy Sorrell	Model & wife of Vic Reeves	Eliminated 1st on 29 November 2004
Natalie Appleton	Former All Saints singer	Withdrew on 29 November 2004
Brian Harvey	Former East 17 lead singer	Withdrew on 26 November 2004

== Results and elimination ==
Indicates that the celebrity was immune from the vote
Indicates that the celebrity received the most votes from the public
Indicates that the celebrity received the fewest votes and was eliminated immediately (no bottom two)
Indicates that the celebrity was named as being in the bottom two

	Day 11	Day 12	Day 13	Day 14	Day 15	Day 17	Day 18 The Final		Number of trials
Joe	Safe	Safe	Safe	Safe	Safe	Safe	Safe	Winner (Day 18)	4
Paul	Safe	Safe	Safe	Safe	Bottom two	Safe	Safe	Runner-up (Day 18)	4
Fran	Safe	Safe	Safe	Safe	Safe	Bottom two	3rd	Eliminated (Day 18)	4
Janet	Safe	Safe	Safe	Safe	Safe	4th	Eliminated (Day 17)		3
Sophie	Safe	Safe	Safe	Bottom two	5th	Eliminated (Day 15)			3
Antonio	Safe	Bottom two	Bottom two	6th	Eliminated (Day 14)				2
Sheila	Safe	Safe	7th	Eliminated (Day 13)					1
Vic	Bottom two	8th	Eliminated (Day 12)						0
Nancy	9th	Eliminated (Day 11)							0
Natalie	Withdrew (Day 10)								4
Brian	Withdrew (Day 7)								1
Bottom two/three	Nancy; Vic	Antonio; Vic	Antonio; Sheila	Antonio; Sophie	Paul; Sophie	Fran; Janet	None		
Eliminated	Nancy Fewest votes to save	Vic Fewest votes to save	Sheila Fewest votes to save	Antonio Fewest votes to save	Sophie Fewest votes to save	Janet Fewest votes to save	Fran Fewest votes to win	Paul Fewest votes to win	
Eliminated	Nancy Fewest votes to save	Vic Fewest votes to save	Sheila Fewest votes to save	Antonio Fewest votes to save	Sophie Fewest votes to save	Janet Fewest votes to save	Fran Fewest votes to win	Joe Most votes to win	

== Bushtucker Trials ==
The contestants take part in daily trials to earn food.

The public voted for who they wanted to face the trial
The contestants decided who did which trial
The trial was compulsory and neither the public or celebrities decided who took part

Trial number	Air date	Name of trial	Celebrity participation	Number of stars	Notes
1	21 November	Stake Out	Antonio; Fran; Joe	4/10 stars	None
2	22 November	Canopy Calamity	Natalie	7/10 stars	None
3	23 November	Snake Strike	Janet	9/10 stars	None
4	24 November	House of Pies	Brian	2/10 stars	None
5	25 November	Temple of Doom	Paul	6/11 stars	None
6 (Live)	26 November	Leap of Faith	Natalie	2/11 stars	None
7	27 November	Snap	Natalie; Sophie	5/10 stars	None
8	28 November	Slither River	Natalie	1/10 stars	None
9	29 November	On Your Knees	Sheila	6/9 stars	^{1}
10	30 November	Hell-O-Copter	Joe	8/8 stars	None
11	1 December	Fill Your Face	Antonio	4/7 stars	None
12	2 December	Slither River 2	Fran	3/6 stars	^{2}
13	3 December	Hump It!	Janet; Sophie	3/5 stars	None
14	4 December	Hell Holes	Paul	4/4 stars	None
15	5 December	Hell Hill 2	Fran; Janet; Joe; Paul	3/4 stars	^{3}
16	6 December	Eel Helmet	Fran	5/5 stars	None
17	6 December	Bushtucker Bonanza	Paul	5/5 stars	None
18	6 December	Danger Down Under	Joe	5/5 stars	None

=== Notes ===
- ^1 Natalie Appleton was initially selected to take part in this trial, but walked out before this and was replaced by Sheila Ferguson.
- ^2 This trial was previously competed 4 days ago.
- ^3 This trial was previously competed last series.

== Star count ==
Celebrity	Number of Stars Earned	Percentage
Antonio Fargas	8/17 stars	47%
Brian Harvey	2/10 stars	20%
Fran Cosgrave	18/29 stars	62%
Janet Street-Porter	12/19 stars	63%
Joe Pasquale	15/22 stars	68%
Nancy Sorrell	—N/a	—N/a
Natalie Appleton	15/41 stars	37%
Paul Burrell	18/24 stars	75%
Sheila Ferguson	6/9 stars	67%
Sophie Anderton	8/15 stars	53%
Vic Reeves	—N/a	—N/a

== Daily summary ==
Day 1 On the day the celebrities arrived, they were split into two groups after making an initial journey to the jungle by helicopter, making this the first time ever that two different arrival routes were used.

The 'Air and Water' group consisted of Paul Burrell, Fran Cosgrave, Joe Pasquale and Nancy Sorrell. Initially, Janet Street-Porter was to be part of this group instead of Paul but they were swapped around at the last minute. Also Brian Harvey was meant to be part of this group but could not following the death of his grandmother. The remaining four members skydived into the jungle before enduring a five-hour hike to the camp.

The 'Earth and Fire' group consisted of Sophie Anderton, Natalie Appleton, Antonio Fargas, Sheila Ferguson and Janet Street-Porter. Initially, Paul Burrell was to be part of this group instead of Janet but they were swapped around at the last minute. These five celebrities took on a four-hour trek to the camp by horseback.

Day 2 The first bushtucker trial of the series was titled 'Stake Out' and was contested by Fran Cosgrave, Joe Pasquale and Antonio Fargas. They won four stars.

Day 3 The second bushtucker trial of the series was titled 'Canopy Calamity' and was contested by Natalie Appleton. She won seven stars.

Day 4 The third bushtucker trial of the series was titled 'Snake Strike' and was contested by Janet Street-Porter. She won nine stars.

The first Celebrity Chest of the series was also held and was done by Paul Burrell and Joe Pasquale.

Day 5 The fourth bushtucker trial of the series was titled 'House of Pies' and was contested by Brian Harvey. He won two stars. Brian later mentioned it was the worst experience of his life.

When dinner was delivered that evening, it was brought along with Vic Reeves, making this the first time a celebrity has entered later than the first day.

Day 6 The fifth bushtucker trial of the series was titled 'Temple of Doom' and was contested by Paul Burrell. Paul had been shortlisted for the previous four trials. He won six stars.

In camp, tensions finally boiled over between Sophie Anderton and Natalie Appleton after the latter had refused to help build a treehouse the previous day in preparation for Vic Reeves' arrival.

Day 7 The sixth bushtucker trial of the series was titled 'Leap of Faith'. It was broadcast live and was contested by Natalie Appleton. She won two stars, quitting early on complaining of feeling sick.

As Brian Harvey arrived in camp, it was announced that his grandmother had died, and he was given the option to leave camp, but decided to stay. During dinner, an argument broke out between Harvey and Janet Street-Porter, and Harvey decided to quit that evening following the spat with Street-Porter.

"You're cooking dinner! You're f**king over there, I'm over there (points away). Don't keep f**king having a go at me about farting!...Just because you think it's wrong doesn't mean everyone else thinks it's wrong. I'm farting because I need to f**king fart, because all I've eaten is f**king beans!... I take it very personal because you know that there's 16 million people watching!"

Brian Harvey's argument speech to Janet

Day 8 The seventh bushtucker trial of the series was titled 'Snap'. and was contested by Sophie Anderton and Natalie Appleton. They won a pasty bap and chips.

Day 9 The eighth bushtucker trial of the series was titled 'Slither River' and was contested by Natalie Appleton. She won five stars, again pulling out a comb complaining of tiredness, fear and weakness.

Day 10 Shortly after the public result of the next bushtucker trial vote was announced. Natalie Appleton finally threw in the towel and walked out after having been nominated.

The day's trial still went ahead, titled 'On Your Knees' and was contested by Sheila Ferguson, by virtue of having polled the next highest number of votes. She won six stars.

Day 11 Despite Natalie's departure, the live eviction still went ahead and Nancy Sorrell was eliminated.

The tenth bushtucker trial of the series was titled 'Hell-O-Copter'. Dubbed as the most dramatic and expensive trial ever staged, it was contested by Joe Pasquale. He won eight stars, the first time this series a celebrity won the maximum.

Day 12 Vic Reeves was the second celebrity to be eliminated. In his exited he said that if he had not left today, he would have pole-vaulted out of the jungle using his giant key (Reeves had kept it as a souvenir after it was used in a celebrity chest he took part in).

The eleventh bushtucker trial of the series was titled 'Fill Your Face' and was contested by Antonio Fargas. He won four stars. After the trial ended, he famously bluffed his words and said "There's a celebrity in my ear!". He meant to say there was a creature in his ear.

Day 13 Sheila Ferguson was the third celebrity to be eliminated.

The twelfth bushtucker trial of the series was titled 'Slither River 2' and was contested by Fran Cosgrave. This was previously attempted by Natalie four days ago. He won three stars.

Day 14 Antonio Fargas was the fourth celebrity to be eliminated.

The thirteenth bushtucker trial of the series was titled 'Hump It!' and was contested by Sophie Anderton and Janet Street-Porter. They won three stars.

Day 15 Sophie Anderton was the fifth celebrity to be eliminated.

The fourteenth bushtucker trial of the series was titled 'Hell Holes' and was contested by Paul Burrell. He won all four stars. Fans of the show have labelled this as one of the most entertaining trials of all series, thanks to Paul's constant screaming and loathing.

Day 16 No celebrity was eliminated from camp today, to make up for Natalie's walkout earlier in the week.

The fifteenth bushtucker trial of the series was titled 'Hell Hill 2' and was contested by all four remaining celebrities. This trial was previously at this stage in the last series. Three stars were won.

Day 17 Janet Street-Porter was the sixth celebrity to be eliminated. This meant Paul Burrell, Fran Cosgrave and Joe Pasquale would contest the final.

All three remaining celebs participated in one bushtucker trial each today, to win a fully prepared three course meal for dinner. Fran Cosgrave contested in 'Eel Helmet' for the starter course. Paul Burrell contested in 'Bushtucker Bonanza' for the main course and Joe Pasquale contested in 'Danger Down Under' for the dessert course. Each of them won the maximum of five stars.

Day 18 Joe Pasquale was crowned 'King of the Jungle' in the final vote. Paul Burrell was second and Fran Cosgrave was third.

== Ratings ==
All ratings are taken from the UK Programme Ratings website, BARB.

Episode	Air date	Official rating (millions)	Weekly rank for all UK TV channels
1	21 November	9.52	14
2	22 November	10.02	15
3	23 November	7.04	35
4	24 November	8.94	20
5	25 November	7.73	32
6	25 November	8.11	26
7	26 November	8.51	20
8	27 November	7.78	31
9	28 November	8.62	22
10	29 November	9.66	14
11	30 November	8.21	23
12	1 December	8.87	18
13	2 December	8.23	22
14	2 December	7.54	29
15	3 December	8.29	21
16	4 December	7.94	25
17	5 December	9.51	15
18	6 December	11.43	7
Series average	2004	8.66	—N/a
Coming Out	8 December	6.56	19
