= Appleton (duo) =

Canadian musical duo

- Origin: Hamilton, Ontario, Canada
- Genre: Pop
- Years active: 2002–2005 · 2025–present
- Label: Polydor
- Spinoff of: All Saints
- Members: Natalie Appleton; Nicole Appleton

Appleton is a Canadian-British musical duo composed of sisters Natalie and Nicole Appleton. The sisters are better known as members of the girl group All Saints.

== Career ==
In 2002, after All Saints disbanded, Natalie and Nicole formed the duo Appleton and signed with Polydor. In September 2002, they released their first single "Fantasy", written with Andy Hayman and Gareth Young, which reached number 2 on the UK Singles Chart. Their autobiography, Together, came out in October 2002. It was stated that director David Slade announced he would direct the autobiographical book into a film, but that has yet to happen. In 2003, they had two more hits with "Don't Worry" and "Everything Eventually" and the album, Everything's Eventual which went Silver in the UK.

In 2004, they left Polydor and signed with Concept Music. Their second album was cancelled after All Saints briefly reformed in 2006.

In 2025, the sisters returned to the studio as Appleton for new music. It was Nicole's son, Gene, who made the initial suggestion. "I remember one day Gene said to me, 'Mum, why don't you just go back into the studio with Auntie Nat?'", Nicole told Rolling Stone UK. "[Our kids] are our harshest critics and if they didn't think it was a good idea, they would have said, 'nah!'", Natalie added. "They're massive fans and I think they thought we should've maybe thought more of ourselves and they just gave us that little nudge to give it a go."

In 2026, they released "Falling into You", their first single in 23 years. The song was co-written with Gareth Young, who also wrote "Fantasy". They performed it with the BBC Concert Orchestra as part of BBC Radio 2's Piano Room.

On September 4th 2026 the duo released an EP, “Side By Side”.

== Discography ==
=== Studio albums ===
List of albums, with selected chart positions, sales, and certifications
Title	Album details	Peak chart positions			Certifications
Title	Album details	UK	IRE	SCO	Certifications
Everything's Eventual	Released: February 24, 2003; Label: Polydor; Format: CD, digital download	9	49	9	UK: Silver

=== Extended plays ===
List of EPs with selected chart positions
Title	Details	Peak chart positions		
Title	Details	UK Sales	UK Download	SCO
Side By Side	Released: 4 September 2026 (UK); Label: Appleton Recordings; Format: CD, digital download, vinyl	51	28	88

=== Singles ===
Title	Year	Peak chart positions									Album
Title	Year	UK	AUS	BEL	EUR	IRE	ITA	NL	SCO	SWI	Album
"Fantasy"	2002	2	56	57	16	15	29	65	2	39	Everything's Eventual
"Don't Worry"	2003	5	—	—	—	—	—	95	6	89	Everything's Eventual
"Everything Eventually"	2003	38	—	—	—	—	—	—	30	—	Everything's Eventual
"Falling into You"	2026	—	—	—	—	—	—	—	—	—	Side By Side
"Ready to Begin"	2026	—	—	—	—	—	—	—	—	—	Side By Side
"—" denotes releases that did not chart or were not released in that territory.
