= Nicole Appleton =

Canadian-born English singer (born 1974)

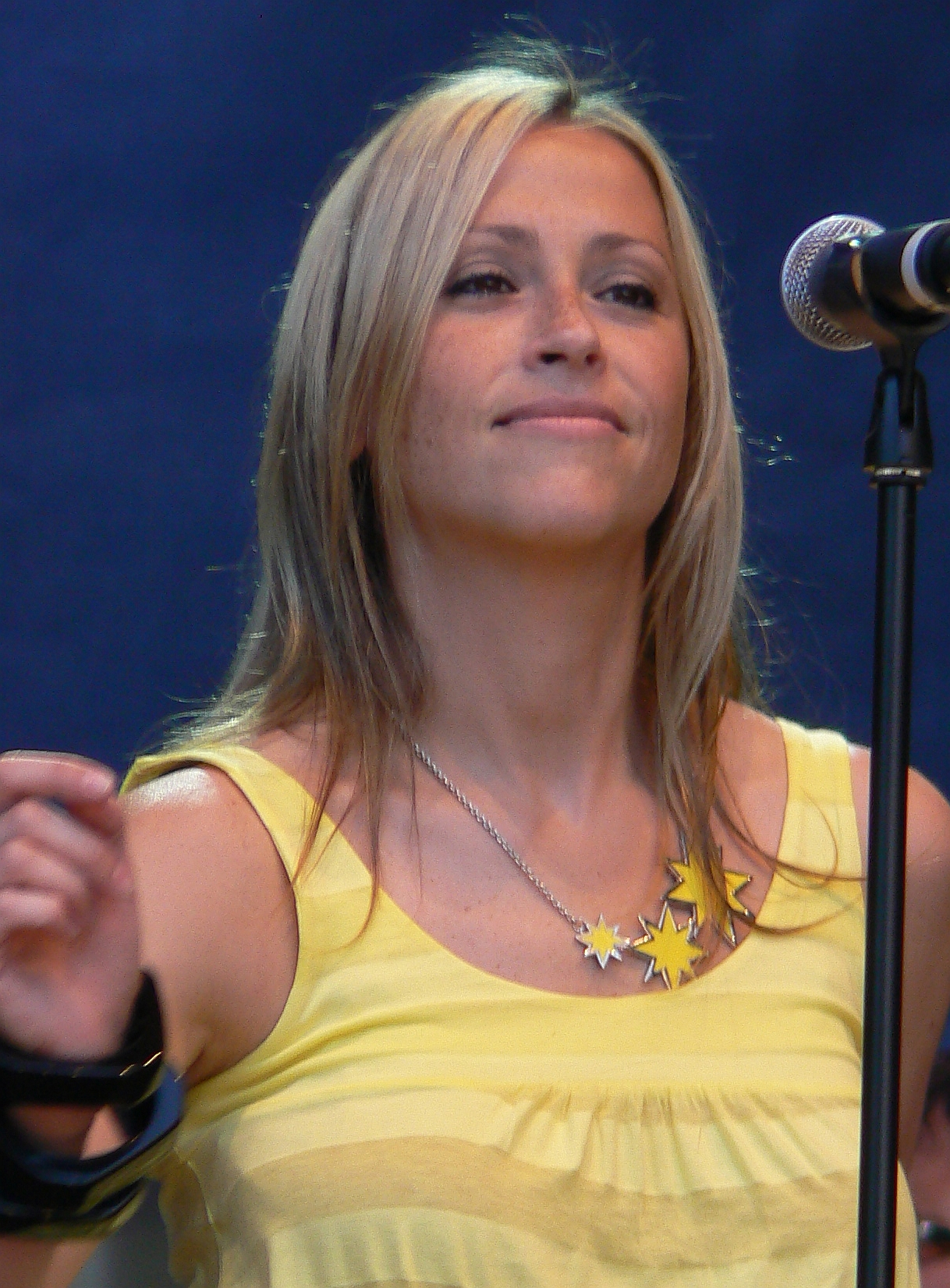
- Appleton performing in 2007
- Born: Nicole Marie Appleton; 7 December 1974 (age 51); Hamilton, Ontario, Canada
- Occupations: Singer; television presenter; actress
- Spouses: Liam Gallagher (m. 2008; div. 2014); Stephen Haines (m. 2021)
- Children: 2
- Relatives: Natalie Appleton (sister)
- Musical career
- Genres: Pop; R&B
- Instrument: Vocals
- Years active: 1996–present
- Label: Polydor
- Formerly of: All Saints; Appleton

Nicole Marie Appleton (born 7 December 1974) is a Canadian singer and television presenter. She is a member of the British girl group All Saints and the pop duo Appleton with her elder sister Natalie Appleton.

== Early life ==
Appleton was born in Hamilton, Ontario, to parents Mary Callaghan and Kenneth Appleton. She is the youngest of four daughters. Her older sisters are Lori, Lee, and Natalie. While growing up, she lived in Toronto, New York City, and London.

== Career ==
=== 1996–2001: Career with All Saints ===
In 1996 Appleton and her sister Natalie Appleton became the third and fourth members of the group All Saints, formed by Melanie Blatt and Shaznay Lewis. All Saints released their debut publicly-available single "I Know Where It's At" in 1997 via London Records and reached number four on the UK Singles Chart. Their second single Never Ever was released in November 1997, and introduced the group to international success, reaching the top ten in several countries and topping the charts in the United Kingdom and Australia. It sold over 1.2 million copies in the UK and was eventually certified double platinum by the British Phonographic Industry. In 1998 the group won BRIT Awards for "Best British Single" and "Best British Video", both for Never Ever. They released their debut album All Saints in November 1997, it reached number two in the UK and was certified five-times platinum by the BPI for sales of 1.5 million. The third single from the album was the double A-side "Under the Bridge / Lady Marmalade", which became their second UK number-one single. "Bootie Call", the fourth single, also went to number one, and the silver-certified "War of Nerves", the fifth and final release, peaked at number seven. The album achieved success in countries such as Australia, Canada and the United States, where All Saints was certified platinum by the RIAA for sales of one million and produced two top forty singles on the Billboard Hot 100: "I Know Where It's At" and "Never Ever".

In February 2000 they released the single "Pure Shores" for the soundtrack of the film The Beach (starring Leonardo DiCaprio). "Pure Shores" was their fourth number-one single in the UK and the second best-selling single of 2000, with 600,000 copies sold; it also became their first and only number-one single in Ireland and was a substantial hit across Europe and Australia. In October 2000, All Saints released the single "Black Coffee", which became their fifth and final number-one single in the UK, selling 200,000 copies. Also in 2000, Nicole and her sister both appeared in the film Honest. This preceded their second studio album, Saints & Sinners, which debuted at number one on the UK Albums Chart, eventually reaching double-platinum certification in the UK for sales of 600,000 copies. The second and final single was "All Hooked Up" in January 2001, which peaked at number seven. In February 2001, All Saints announced that they were to take a break so that they "could clear the air between themselves". In November 2001, London Records released a greatest hits compilation entitled All Hits.

=== 2002–2005: Career with Appleton ===
In September 2002, Nicole and her sister Natalie launched themselves back onto the music scene, with their first single, "Fantasy", written with Andy Hayman and Gareth Young, reaching No. 2 in the UK Singles Chart. Their autobiography, Together, came out in October 2002. In 2003, they had two more hits with "Don't Worry" and "Everything Eventually", and success with their album, Everything's Eventual, which went gold in the UK after just two months. They decided to sign a deal with Concept Music in late 2004 because of differences with their previous label, Polydor.

=== 2006–present: All Saints reunion and television ===
On 24 January 2006, it was announced that the group had reformed and signed a record deal with Parlophone. They subsequently began work on their third studio album, Studio 1. The first single, "Rock Steady" (released in November 2006), reached number three on the UK Singles Chart. Studio 1 entered the albums chart at number forty and sold 60,000 copies according to the BPI, being certified silver. From 2007 to 2010 Nicole has been a host of the TV show The Hot Desk. She is also the host of Cover Me Canada, a Canadian reality singing competition that debuted on CBC Television in 2011.

In 2014, All Saints reformed to support the Backstreet Boys for five dates across the UK and Ireland in 2014. On 27 January 2016, it was confirmed that All Saints will release their fourth studio album, Red Flag, on 8 April 2016. The lead single from the album, "One Strike", preceded the album on 28 February 2016.

== Personal life ==
On 7 December 1997, Appleton met Robbie Williams while filming Top of the Pops. A relationship began, and they were subsequently engaged. In Together, an autobiography she co-authored with her sister Natalie, Appleton revealed that she had an abortion of her and Williams' baby after pressure from her record company, writing: "I couldn't believe what I had done. I wanted to kill myself. Afterwards, everyone pretended it hadn't happened." Their relationship ended in January 1999. Their relationship was depicted in Williams' biopic, Better Man (2024).

In 2000, Appleton started a relationship with Liam Gallagher, the frontman of the group Oasis. She gave birth to their son Gene on 2 July 2001. Gallagher wrote the song "Songbird" as a token of his love for Appleton. The couple married at Marylebone Town Hall in London on the morning of 14 February 2008.

In April 2014, the couple divorced after the media revealed Liam Gallagher was expecting a child with another woman.

In March 2020, Appleton announced she had given birth to a daughter with her boyfriend Stephen Haines. Appleton and Haines married in October 2021.

== Filmography ==
=== Television ===
Year	Title	Role	Notes
2007–2010	The Hot Desk	Presenter	
2011	Cover Me Canada	Presenter	
2013	The X Factor	Guest mentor	Episode: "Judges' Houses"
2015	The X Factor NZ	Guest mentor	Episode: "Judges Retreat"
2019, 2023	Celebrity Gogglebox	Herself	Series 1 and 5

=== Films ===
Year	Title	Role
1985	Santa Claus: The Movie	Little girl
2000	Scream for Christmas	Angie
2000	Honest	Gerry Chase
