= Everything's Eventual (album) =

Studio album by Appleton
- Released: February 24, 2003
- Recorded: January–May 2002
- Studios: Riff Raff; Sphere; Metropolis
- Genre: Pop
- Length: 51:42
- Label: Polydor
- Producers: Gareth Young; Craigie Dodds; Marius de Vries; Carsten Kroeyer; Mike Rowe; Peter de Hallivand; Mike Spencer; Hank Hughes; Martin Harrington; Ash Howes

Singles from Everything's Eventual
- 1. "Fantasy" Released: September 2, 2002; 2. "Don't Worry" Released: February 10, 2003; 3. "Everything Eventually" Released: July 14, 2003

Everything's Eventual is the only studio album by Canadian musical duo Appleton, made up of sisters Natalie and Nicole Appleton. It was released on February 24, 2003, through Polydor Records. Three singles were released from the album: "Fantasy", "Don't Worry" and "Everything Eventually". The album and singles performed reasonably well on the UK charts; however, the label thought that 70,000 copies sold was too little for their contract, and this eventually led to Appleton being dropped by Polydor.

Demon Music Group released the first-ever 12-inch vinyl versions of the album on June 17, 2023, to celebrate 20 years since its first release. Purple- and white-coloured versions were pressed with original album art, lyrics and photographs, along with additional unreleased tracks and B-sides.

== Background ==
Natalie and Nicole Appleton had been part of the successful girl group All Saints from 1996 until the band announced in February 2001 that they were to take a break so that they "could clear the air between themselves". The sisters wanted to continue performing and making music so went into the recording studio to try out some songs, the result being Everything's Eventual. "We created the album ourselves off our own backs so there was no need to change any elements when we signed our new deal. It has just been mixed since we signed to Polydor," the duo said. "We love our All Saints fans and hope we can also attract new fans as our music has developed. We've been enjoying playing around with new ideas in the studio with no limits and it’s a new beginning for us."

The album is named after the Stephen King short story collection Everything's Eventual, since Natalie Appleton is a great admirer of him. The album was initially to be named Aloud but the name was changed to avoid any association with then labelmates Girls Aloud.

== Critical reception ==
Professional ratings
Review scores
Source	Rating
AllMusic	4/5 stars
Entertainment.ie	mixed
Gaffa	3/6 stars
The Guardian	2/5 stars
The Independent	negative
Manchester Evening News	positive
Q	4/5

In a review for AllMusic, Jon O'Brien wrote that Appleton had "easily surpassed some rather lowly expectations with their debut album." He opined that it "positions [the sisters] as gifted songwriters, with a knack for a strong pop melody", and praised the combination of "shimmering electronica, acoustic pop, and heartfelt understated ballads to produce an eclectic and confident first offering". O'brien described the album as being "at its best [...] when it's at its most introspective", though he went on to write that "Lyrically, they shouldn't be expecting any Ivor Novello nods just yet". A review for Entertainment.ie described Everything's Eventual as "polished and professional, but ultimately far too shallow to care much about one way or the other.", and that the duo "flit from style to style, tackling rock, techno and hip-hop without ever really sounding convincing in any of them." Noting the album's lyrics, the reviewer opined that the Appleton sisters "fail to understand that the mundane details of their domestic routines are of little interest to anyone outside their immediate family circle." A review by Betty Clarke for The Guardian noted that "This debut sees [Appleton] slipping into exotic styles with as much profundity as a new pair of Gucci jeans." Comparing aspects of the album to singers Natalie Imbruglia and Robbie Williams, the writer concluded that "smug Appleton give rock'n'roll wifedom a bad name. Natalie has a good voice [...], but Appleton have too little focus and too much to prove. Paul Taylor for the Manchester Evening News described the album as "[surprisingly] "not half bad.", concluding the review by stating that "OK, they have not exactly reinvented the wheel, but neither is this album the crock it could have been."

== Track listing ==
No.	Title	Lyrics	Music	Producer(s)	Length
1.	"Fantasy"	Andy Hayman	Gareth Young	Young	3:49
2.	"Don't Worry"	Damien Hastings; Natalie Appleton	Craigie Dodds; Hastings	Dodds	4:44
3.	"Hallelujah"	Natalie Appleton	Carsten Kroeyer; Stephen Garrikk	Kroeyer	4:27
4.	"Everything Eventually"	Natalie Appleton; Nicole Appleton	Alexis Smith; Marius de Vries	de Vries	4:47
5.	"M.W.A."	Peter de Havilland	de Havilland	de Havilland	3:39
6.	"Ring-A-Ding-Ding"	Natalie Appleton	de Vries	de Vries	6:31
7.	"Supernaturally"	Mike Spencer; Liz Horseman	Spencer; Horseman	Ash Howes; Martin Harrington; Spencer	3:41
8.	"All Grown Up"	Nicole Appleton	Mike Rowe	Rowe	4:23
9.	"Waiting for Your Love"	Natalie Appleton	Kroeyer	Howes; Harrington	3:34
10.	"5am"	Hastings; Natalie Appleton	Hastings	Guy Farley; Graeme Pleeth; Howes; Harrington	4:13
11.	"Long Long Road"	Charlise Rickwood	Hank Hughes	Howes; Hughes; Harrington	4:16
12.	"Anyone"	Natalie Appleton; Nicole Appleton; Hayman	Young	Howes; Harrington	3:33
13.	"Blow My Mind" (UK bonus track and B-side for Fantasy)	Natalie Appleton; Hayman	Young	Young	3:48

Deluxe 2023 edition
No.	Title	Lyrics	Music	Producer(s)	Length
1.	"Sugarman" (B-side for Don't Worry)	Damien Hastings; Natalie Appleton	Farley, Yoad Nevo, Tony Mcananey	Farley	3:55
2.	"Open to Suggestion" (B-side for Don't Worry)	Tommy Danvers; Natalie Appleton	Rosie Wetters	Tommy Danvers	3:46
3.	"I'm Your Angel" (B-side for Everything Eventually)	Nicole Appleton	Mike Rowe; Dave Saw	Mike Rowe; Peter Rowe	2:58
4.	"Let It All Hang Out" (Previously unreleased)	Barry McEwan; B.B. Cunningham	Liam Gallagher	de Havilland	2:48

== Personnel ==
Adapted from the album's liner notes.

=== Musicians ===
Appleton

- Natalie Appleton – vocals
- Nicole Appleton – vocals

Additional musicians

- Roger Benou – bass guitar (track 11)
- Simon Benson – double bass (tracks 4, 6)
- Leon Bosch – double bass (tracks 4, 6)
- Marcus Brown – backing vocals (track 10)
- COOL Music – orchestral contractors (tracks 2, 10)
- Caroline Dale – cello (track 2)
- Seton Daunt – additional guitars (tracks 2, 3, 7, 10), additional bass guitar (tracks 2, 7), guitar (track 9)
- Geoff Dugmore – drums & Percussion (track 2)
- Phil Dukes – strings (track 2)
- Matt Exelby – guitar (track 1), bass guitar (track 1)
- Guy Farley – strings arrangement (track 2), keyboards (track 2), orchestral arrangements (track 10), piano (track 10)
- Stephen Garrikk – piano (track 3)
- Paul Gendler – electric guitar (tracks 4, 6), acoustic guitar (track 4, 6)
- Janice Graham – strings (track 2)
- Isobel Griffiths – strings contractor (tracks 4, 6)
- Simon Hale – piano (track 12), keyboards (track 12)
- Lynda Houghton – double bass (tracks 4, 6)
- Hank Hughes – keyboards (track 11)
- Rob Johnson – guitar (track 2)
- Carsten Kroeyer – keyboards (track 9), electronic sounds (track 9)
- Tony McAnaney – bass guitar (track 10), acoustic guitar (track 10)
- Melanie Marshall – backing vocals (track 2)
- David Rainger – guitar (track 3), additional guitar (track 9)
- Lucy Rowe – backing vocals (tracks 1, 13)
- Trevor Rowe – guitar (track 13)
- Mary Scully – double bass (tracks 4, 6)
- Christopher Slaski – director (track 10)
- Alexis Smith – keyboards (tracks 4, 6)
- Harvey de Souza – strings (track 2)
- Steve Sidelnyk – drum programming (track 7)
- John Themis – guitar (track 2)
- Marius de Vries – keyboards (tracks 4, 6)
- Allen Walley – bass (tracks 4, 6)
- Gareth Young – guitar (tracks 1, 13), bass guitar (track 13), keyboards (track 13)

=== Technical ===
- James Bailes – production assistant (track 5)
- Andy Bradfield – mixing (tracks 4, 6)
- Marcus Brown – original programming (track 10)
- Baz Cox – engineer (tracks 1, 13)
- Craigie Dodds – producer (track 2)
- Chris Elliott – musical director (tracks 4, 6)
- Guy Farley – additional production (tracks 2, 5), vocal recording (track 5), original production (track 10), orchestral production (track 10)
- Jack Guy – engineer (track 2)
- Martin Harrington – additional production (tracks 2, 3, 5, 8, 10), additional mixing (tracks 3, 5, 10), co-producer (tracks 7, 11), producer (tracks 9, 12)
- Peter de Havilland – producer (track 5), vocal recording (track 5)
- Ash Howes – mixing (tracks 1, 2, 7–9, 11–13), additional mixing (tracks 3, 5, 10), additional production (tracks 2, 3, 5, 8, 10), co-producer (tracks 7, 11), producer (tracks 9, 12)
- Hank Hughes – co-producer (track 11)
- Stephen Kennedy – design & art direction
- Carsten Kroeyer – producer (track 3), engineer (track 3), programming (tracks 3, 9), production concept (track 9)
- Graeme Pleeth – original guitars recording (track 2), orchestral production (track 10)
- Sean McNemony – photography
- Mike Ross Trevor – London engineer (track 10)
- Mike Rowe – producer (track 8)
- James Sanger – additional programming (tracks 2, 3, 5), programming (tracks 7– 9, 12, 13)
- Alexis Smith – programming (tracks 4, 6)
- Mike Spencer – co-producer (track 7)
- Chris Tuck – programming (track 2)
- Marius de Vries – producer (tracks 4, 6)
- Pat Walters – production assistant (track 5)
- Richard Wilkinson – additional engineering & programming (tracks 1–3, 5, 7–12)
- Gareth Young – producer (tracks 1, 13)
- Tim Young – mastering (all tracks)
- Recorded at Riff Raff, Cornwall; Sphere, Monroe and Metropolis, London

== Charts ==
Chart (2003)	Peak position
Irish Albums (IRMA)	49
Scottish Albums (Official Charts)	9
UK Albums (Official Charts)	9

== Certifications and sales ==
Region	Certification	Certified units/sales
United Kingdom (BPI)	Silver	60,000^{^}
^{^} Shipments figures based on certification alone.
