= Model Behavior (film) =

1982 film directed by Bud Gardner

- Directed by: Bud Gardner
- Written by: Martin Kitrosser; Gordon Reynolds
- Produced by: J. Christian Ingvordsen; Steven Kaman
- Starring: Bruce Lyons; Richard Bekins; Anne Marie Howard; Cindy Harrell
- Cinematography: Steven Kaman
- Edited by: Scott Vickrey
- Music by: Phil Galdston; Andy Goldmark
- Release date: 1984
- Running time: 88 minutes
- Country: United States
- Language: English

Model Behavior is an American 1984 romantic comedy film by director Bud Gardner, starring Anne Marie Howard and Richard Bekins. The film was produced by Boptex Studio in the United States of America.

Filming began in New York City on July 11, 1983, and was scheduled to last for around 25 days. The film was shown at the 1984 Cannes Film Festival on May 19.

== Synopsis ==
Fresh out of college, an aspiring photographer and his ad-man partner set out to take the modeling industry by storm. A lovely model captures the photographer's heart.

== Reception ==
Variety reviewer Kaja said the film had "vivacious visuals and beautiful bodies". Kaja concluded, "Technical credits are above average for the genre, and young actors are ambitious enough to do very good work here." In a negative review, film critic L.A. Morse wrote, "There is probably a funny, sexy movie to be made about the world of models, but this lifeless and amateurish effort—combining as it does the sexual maturity of a pre-teen with the comic sensibility of a bad sitcom—sure ain't it." VideoHound gave the film 1.5 stars. Filmdienst reviewed the film.
