= Natalie Appleton =

Canadian-born English singer (born 1973)

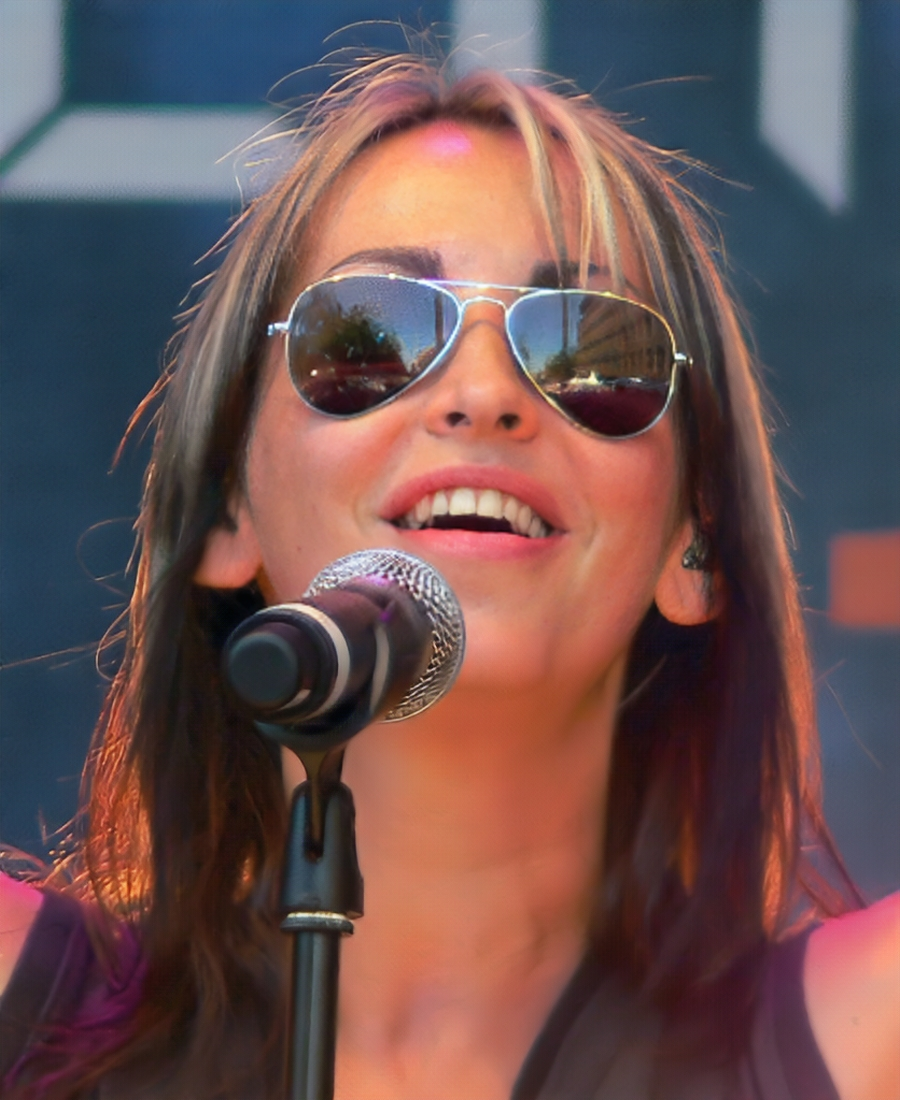
- Appleton performing in 2007
- Born: Natalie Jane Appleton; 14 May 1973 (age 53); Mississauga, Ontario, Canada
- Occupations: Singer; actress
- Spouses: Carl Robinson (m. 1993; annul. 1995) Liam Howlett (m. 2002)
- Children: 2
- Relatives: Nicole Appleton (sister)
- Musical career
- Genres: Pop; R&B
- Instrument: Vocals
- Years active: 1996–present
- Formerly of: All Saints

Natalie Jane Appleton Howlett (born 14 May 1973) is a Canadian singer. She is a member of the British girl group All Saints and the duo Appleton with her younger sister Nicole Appleton.

Appleton joined All Saints in 1996, becoming the fourth and final member of the group, but five years later they split up amid group in-fighting. She went on to form a duo with Nicole, under the name Appleton. Since then, she has reunited to release three more albums with All Saints, in 2006, 2016 and 2018.

== Career ==
In 1983, Appleton moved to London and attended the Sylvia Young Theatre School. She had a brief cameo in an episode of Grange Hill in 1986.

=== 1996–2001: All Saints ===
Appleton's father met Melanie Blatt, with whom Nicole had attended the Sylvia Young Theatre School, and heard that Blatt was looking for new members for her girl group. Nicole asked whether her sister could join the group as well. In 1996 both sisters joined Blatt and Shaznay Lewis, forming All Saints. In 2000, Natalie and Nicole appeared in the poorly received film Honest. All Saints split acrimoniously in 2001 amid much foment and rumour. In their five-year career, the group scored a total of five number-one singles.

=== 2002–2005: Appleton and television ===
Natalie and Nicole formed the duo Appleton and launched their first single "Fantasy" in September 2002 which features Natalie doing a stage dive. Initially, it was to be Nicole doing the stage dive, but she backed out at the last minute, and thus Natalie took her place. The album Everything's Eventual was released in early 2003 and coincided with the documentary Appleton on Appleton which gave an inside look into the life of the sisters. In November 2004, Appleton was a contestant on the fourth series of I'm a Celebrity... Get Me Out of Here!. While on the show the public voted for her numerous times to take part in bushtucker trials, she was not very successful in completing the challenges and left after the public voted for her to do what would have been a record fifth bushtucker trial.

=== 2006–present: All Saints return ===
From 2006 to 2008 All Saints reunited and released their third studio album titled Studio 1 on 13 November 2006. However, the group subsequently split again in 2009.

In 2014, All Saints reformed to support the Backstreet Boys for five dates across the UK and Ireland. On 27 January 2016, it was confirmed that All Saints were scheduled to release their fourth studio album Red Flag on 8 April 2016. The lead single from the album, "One Strike", preceded the album on 26 February 2016.

In 2023, Appleton competed on the fourth series of The Masked Singer as "Fawn" and finished in third place.

== Early and personal life ==
Nicole and Natalie have two older sisters. Natalie was born in Mississauga, Ontario, to parents Mary Callaghan and Kenneth Appleton. While growing up she lived in Toronto, New York City, and London.

She attended high school in Ellenville, New York, and eventually left to sing at a country club at age 15. In 1990, she moved back to Camden, London, where she met Carl Robinson, a stripper with the Dreamboys whom she met when seeing them perform on a night out in London when she was 17. On 19 May 1992, their daughter was born. She and Robinson moved to the US where they married in 1993, before Appleton returned to the United Kingdom after having the marriage annulled.

She had relationships with television presenter Jamie Theakston and actor Jonny Lee Miller during the late 1990s.

Appleton began dating Liam Howlett of the electronic band the Prodigy in 2000, after they met at V Festival. They married on 7 June 2002 in a ceremony in France. In addition to Appleton's daughter from her first marriage, the couple have a son, born in 2004. The family lives in the Hampstead area of London.

== Filmography ==
=== Television ===
Year	Title	Role
2004	PJ's Storytime	Presenter
2004	I'm a Celebrity...Get Me Out of Here!	Contestant
2023	The Masked Singer	Contestant (as Fawn)

=== Films ===
Year	Title	Role
2000	Honest	Mandy Chase
