= Garage Classical =

Studio album by DJ Spoony with Katie Chatburn and the Ignition Orchestra
- Released: 18 October 2019
- Recorded: 2019
- Genres: UK garage; house; orchestral
- Length: 53:00
- Label: Since 93
- Producer: DJ Spoony

Garage Classical is the first album by British disc jockey DJ Spoony with Katie Chatburn and the Ignition Orchestra, released on 18 October 2019, on the Since 93 label. The album contains orchestral covers of classic UK garage tracks and features appearances from Paloma Faith, Sugababes, Lily Allen, Emeli Sandé, Gabrielle, So Solid Crew and more.

The album was preceded by the release of two promotional singles, "Moving Too Fast" featuring Paloma Faith and "Sweet Like Chocolate" featuring Lily Allen. "Flowers" featuring Sugababes was the only single to chart, reaching No. 22 in Scotland and No. 26 on the UK Dance Singles Chart.

== Background and promotion ==
On 28 August 2019, during an interview with Official Charts Company, the DJ announced the album and mentioned about the artists he was collaborating with: "I know Sugababes' Mutya and Keisha personally because they are huge garage fans. They were always out in the garage clubs, but at the same time, they were huge pop stars and the biggest girl band in the country."

The album was released on CD format on 18 October 2019, followed by a double LP on 6 December 2019.

== Live ==
A live show was performed on 24 October 2019 at the Royal Albert Hall.

== Track listing ==
Garage Classical
No.	Title	Writer(s)	Original artist	Length
1.	"Moving Too Fast" (featuring Paloma Faith)	Orlando Levene Johnson; Fabio Raponi; Ingo Peter Schwartz	Artful Dodger and Romina Johnson	3:58
2.	"Flowers" (featuring Sugababes)	Mike Powell; Martin Green	Sweet Female Attitude (based on the Sunship remix)	4:03
3.	"Body Groove" (featuring Nay Nay and Ms. Banks)	Ashley Akabah; Paul Akabah	Architechs	3:31
4.	"Sweet Like Chocolate" (featuring Lily Allen)	Steven Meade; Danny Langsman	Shanks & Bigfoot	4:25
5.	"Gotta Get Thru This" (featuring Zak Abel)	Daniel Bedingfield	Daniel Bedingfield	2:45
6.	"Fill Me In" (featuring Raleigh Ritchie)	Craig David; Mark Hill	Craig David	4:17
7.	"Back Up, Back Up"		Wookie (based on the DJ Zinc remix of the original version titled "Back Up (To Me)")	4:14
8.	"Crazy Love" (featuring Emeli Sandé)	Elisabeth Troy; Matt Coleman	MJ Cole	4:11
9.	"Sunshine" (featuring Gabrielle)	Gabrielle; Jonathan Shorten	Gabrielle (based on the Wookie remix)	3:52
10.	"My Desire" (featuring Aśa)	Josh Milan; Kevin Hedge	Amira (based on the Dreem Teem remix)	3:33
11.	"Sincere" (featuring Hamzaa)	Matt Coleman	MJ Cole	4:26
12.	"Gabriel" (featuring Lifford)		Roy Davis Jr. and Peven Everett	6:14
13.	"21 Seconds" (featuring So Solid Crew)	Jason Phillips; Jason Moore; Michael Harvey Jr.; Dwayne Vincent; Lisa Maffia; Darren Weir; Shane Neil; M.J. Harvey; Marvin Dawkins; Ashley Walters	So Solid Crew	3:10

== Charts ==
Chart (2019)	Peak position
UK Albums (Official Charts)	48

== Release history ==
List of release dates, showing region, formats, label and reference
Region	Date	Format(s)	Label	Ref.
United Kingdom	18 October 2019	Digital download; CD	Since 93	
United Kingdom	6 December 2019	2xLP vinyl	Since 93	

== See also ==
- Garage Classics
