= Garage Classics =

Studio album by The House & Garage Orchestra
- Released: 30 November 2018
- Recorded: 2018
- Genre: UK garage; house; orchestral
- Length: 75:00
- Label: New State Music
- Producer: Darren Tate; Shy Cookie

Garage Classics is the debut album by the House & Garage Orchestra, released on 30 November 2018 on the New State Music label. It was released on CD and as a digital download. The album was produced by Darren Tate and Alex Mercier (Shy Cookie), and contains orchestral covers of classic UK garage tracks with appearances from Kele Le Roc, Sweet Female Attitude, Shola Ama, Shelley Nelson, MC Neat, Tough Love and more.

== Touring ==
To promote the album, the House & Garage Orchestra toured and performed live shows around the UK in venues such as the Albert Hall in Manchester, Tramshed in Cardiff, Liverpool Olympia, Brighton Dome, Portsmouth Guildhall, KOKO, Shepherd's Bush Empire and the Roundhouse, and continued to tour throughout 2021 and 2022.

In a review of their show at The Globe in Cardiff, Campbell Prosser, writing for Buzz Magazine, said: "It was refreshing and impressive to hear iconic UK garage tracks performed with live musicians and instruments... The vocal performances were a real highlight." He concluded the review: "Although the magnitude of the performance wasn't exactly as expected – albeit likely due to my own misguided assumptions – the artists and musicians made up for this with their visible passion for the genre. They've clearly mastered what was/is the garage scene and adding this twist breathes new life into some iconic tracks."

== Chart performance ==
Garage Classics reached No. 37 on the UK Digital Albums Chart.

== Track listing ==
Garage Classics
No.	Title	Original artist	Length
1.	"Movin' Too Fast" (featuring Kayla Amor)	Artful Dodger and Romina Johnson
2.	"Flowers" (featuring Sweet Female Attitude)	Sweet Female Attitude (based on the Sunship remix)
3.	"Straight from the Heart" (featuring Shelley Nelson)	Doolally
4.	"Sorry" (featuring Denzee)	Monsta Boy featuring Denzie
5.	"My Love" (featuring Kele Le Roc)	Kele Le Roc (based on the 10° Below Vocal Mix)
6.	"Sincere" (featuring Camden Cox)	MJ Cole
7.	"A Little Bit of Luck" (featuring MC Neat)	DJ Luck & MC Neat
8.	"Something in Your Eyes" (featuring Shelley Nelson)	Ed Case (based on the K-Warren remix)
9.	"Things We Do for Love" (featuring Kele Le Roc)	Sticky featuring Kele Le Roc
10.	"Let Me Show You How" (featuring Kayla Amor and Shy Cookie)
11.	"Imagine" (featuring Shola Ama)	Shola Ama (based on the Asylum remix)
12.	"Poison" (featuring MC Neat and Oggie)	Corrupted Cru, DJ Luck and Shy Cookie featuring JJ and MC Neat (based on this version)/ (original version by Bell Biv DeVoe)
13.	"Back Up, Back Up, Back Up"	Wookie (based on the DJ Zinc remix of the original version titled "Back Up (To Me)")
14.	"Master Blaster" (featuring MC Neat and Oggie)	DJ Luck & MC Neat featuring JJ (based on this version)/ (original version by Stevie Wonder)
15.	"Gypsy Woman" (featuring Sweet Female Attitude)	Crystal Waters
16.	"Romeo" (featuring Kele Le Roc)	Basement Jaxx
17.	"Closer Than Close" (featuring BB Diamond, Freejak and Safety First)	Rosie Gaines (based on the Mentor Original Mix)
18.	"Hideaway" (featuring Tough Love and Reigns)	Tough Love and Reigns (based on this version)/ (original version by De'Lacy)

== Charts ==
Chart (2018)	Peak position
UK Album Downloads (OCC)	37

== See also ==
- Garage Classical
