= List of songs remixed by Wideboys =

The Wideboys are a British record production and remixing duo, active since 1996. The duo have remixed many songs by a wide range of artists. The following is a list of notable songs which they have officially remixed. See the track listing section of the song articles for reference; citations are otherwise included if there is no track listing section in a song article or if a Wideboys remix listing does not appear on the track listing section of a song article.

== A ==
- Alexandra Burke - "Elephant"
- Alex Gaudino - "I'm in Love (I Wanna Do It)"
- Alexis Jordan - "Happiness"
- Alicia Keys - "Teenage Love Affair"
- All Saints - "Black Coffee"
- Alphabeat - "Hole in My Heart"
- Amelia Lily - "Shut Up (And Give Me Whatever You Got)"
- Anne-Marie and James Arthur - "Rewrite the Stars"
- Aretha Franklin - "Rolling in the Deep (The Aretha Version)"
- Artful Dodger - "Re-Rewind (The Crowd Say Bo Selecta)"
- Artful Dodger - "Woman Trouble"

== B ==
- Bananarama - "Love Comes"
- Basshunter - "Please Don't Go"
- Basshunter - "All I Ever Wanted"
- Ben Haenow - "Second Hand Heart"
- Black Eyed Peas - "The Time (Dirty Bit)"
- Breathe Carolina - "Blackout"
- Breathe Carolina - "Hit and Run"

== C ==
- Cahill - "Trippin' on You"
- Cascada - "Fever"
- Cascada - "Pyromania"
- Cascada - "San Francisco"
- Cher Lloyd - "Swagger Jagger"
- Cheryl Cole - "Call My Name"
- Cheryl Cole - "The Flood"
- Clean Bandit - "Solo"
- Clean Bandit - "Tears"
- Conor Maynard - "Animal"
- Conor Maynard - "Vegas Girl"

== D ==
- Demi Lovato - "La La Land"
- Drumsound & Bassline Smith featuring Fleur East - "One In a Million"

== E ==
- Ella Henderson - "Yours"
- Emeli Sandé - "My Kind of Love"
- Estelle - "No Substitute Love"
- Example - "Kickstarts"
- Example - "Midnight Run"
- Example - "Won't Go Quietly"

== F ==
- Far East Movement - "Live My Life"
- Fleur East - "Sax"
- Florrie - "Little White Lies"
- Foxes - "Holding onto Heaven"

== G ==
- Gabriella Cilmi - "On a Mission"
- Girls Aloud - "The Loving Kind"
- G.R.L. - "Ugly Heart"

== H ==
- Hollywood Undead - "Comin' In Hot"

== I ==
- Ida Corr - "Ride My Tempo"
- Iggy Azalea - "Change Your Life"

== J ==
- James Blunt - "Stay the Night"
- Janet Jackson - "Feedback"
- Jason Derulo - "In My Head"
- Jason Derulo - "The Sky's the Limit"
- Jason Derulo - "Swalla"
- Jason Derulo - "What If"
- Jennifer Lopez - "Brave"
- JLS - "Hottest Girl in the World"
- JLS - "Take a Chance on Me"
- Jody Watley - "I Want Your Love"

== K ==
- Kesha - "C'Mon"
- Kristine W - "The Power of Music"

== L ==
- Labrinth - "Express Yourself"
- Labrinth - "Let the Sun Shine"
- Lawson - "Taking Over Me"
- Leona Lewis - "Trouble"
- Liberty - "Thinking It Over"
- Lily Allen - "The Fear"
- Little Boots - "Remedy"
- Little Mix - "Hair"
- Liza Fox - "I Am Not I"
- Lloyd - "How We Do It (Around My Way)"
- LMFAO - "Party Rock Anthem"
- Luke Friend - "Hole in My Heart"

== M ==
- Madison Beer - "Say It to My Face"
- Mark Ronson - "Uptown Funk"
- Maverick Sabre - "No One"
- Meridian Dan - "German Whip"
- Michelle Williams - "We Break the Dawn"
- Mini Viva - "One Touch"

== N ==
- N-Dubz - "Ouch"
- N.E.R.D. - "Hot-n-Fun"
- Nico & Vinz - "That's How You Know"
- Nicole Scherzinger - "On the Rocks"
- Nicole Scherzinger - "Right There"

== O ==
- Olly Murs - "Troublemaker"
- Olly Murs - "Up"
- Owl City and Carly Rae Jepsen - "Good Time"

== P ==
- Parade - "Louder"
- Pink - "Just Like Fire"
- Priyanka Chopra - "In My City"
- Professor Green - "Little Secrets"
- The Pussycat Dolls - "Whatcha Think About That"
- The Pussycat Dolls - "When I Grow Up"

== Q ==
- Qwote - "Throw Your Hands Up (Dançar Kuduro)"

== R ==
- Rihanna - "Don't Stop the Music"
- Rihanna - "Question Existing"
- Rihanna - "Shut Up and Drive"
- Rihanna - "Te Amo"

== S ==
- The Saturdays - "Disco Love"
- The Saturdays - "Just Can't Get Enough"
- The Saturdays - "Up"
- Selena Gomez & the Scene - "Round & Round"
- September - "Can't Get Over"
- Shanks & Bigfoot - "Sing-A-Long"
- Snoop Dogg - "Sensual Seduction"
- Starboy Nathan - "Diamonds"
- Steps - "Scared of the Dark"

== T ==
- Taio Cruz - "Higher"
- The Ting Tings - "Hands"
- Tru Faith & Dub Conspiracy - "Freak like Me"

== U ==
- Usher - "Numb"

== V ==
- Vanessa Amorosi - "This Is Who I Am"

== W ==
- Wideboys - "Sambuca"
- Wretch 32 - "Hush Little Baby"

== Notes ==
- Please refer to the Track listing sections of the above song articles.
