= Sincere (disambiguation) =

Sincerity is the virtue of one who communicates and acts in accordance with their feelings, beliefs, thoughts and desires.

Sincere may also refer to:

== People ==
- Jean Sincere (1919–2013), American film, television, theater and voice actress
- Lamont Sincere, American singer, songwriter and record producer
- Salvatore Sincere, American professional wrestler
- Seth Sincere, Nigerian footballer

== Music ==
- Sincere (MJ Cole album), a 2000 album by MJ Cole
  - "Sincere" (song), its title track, released in 1998
- Sincere (Khalid album), a 2024 album by Khalid
- "Are You Sincere", a 1957 song by Andy Williams, later recorded by Elvis Presley

== Other uses ==
- Sincere Department Store, a Hong Kong department store
- Sincere voting, casting a vote for an outcome that the voter prefers above all others
