= Greg Stainer =

British DJ

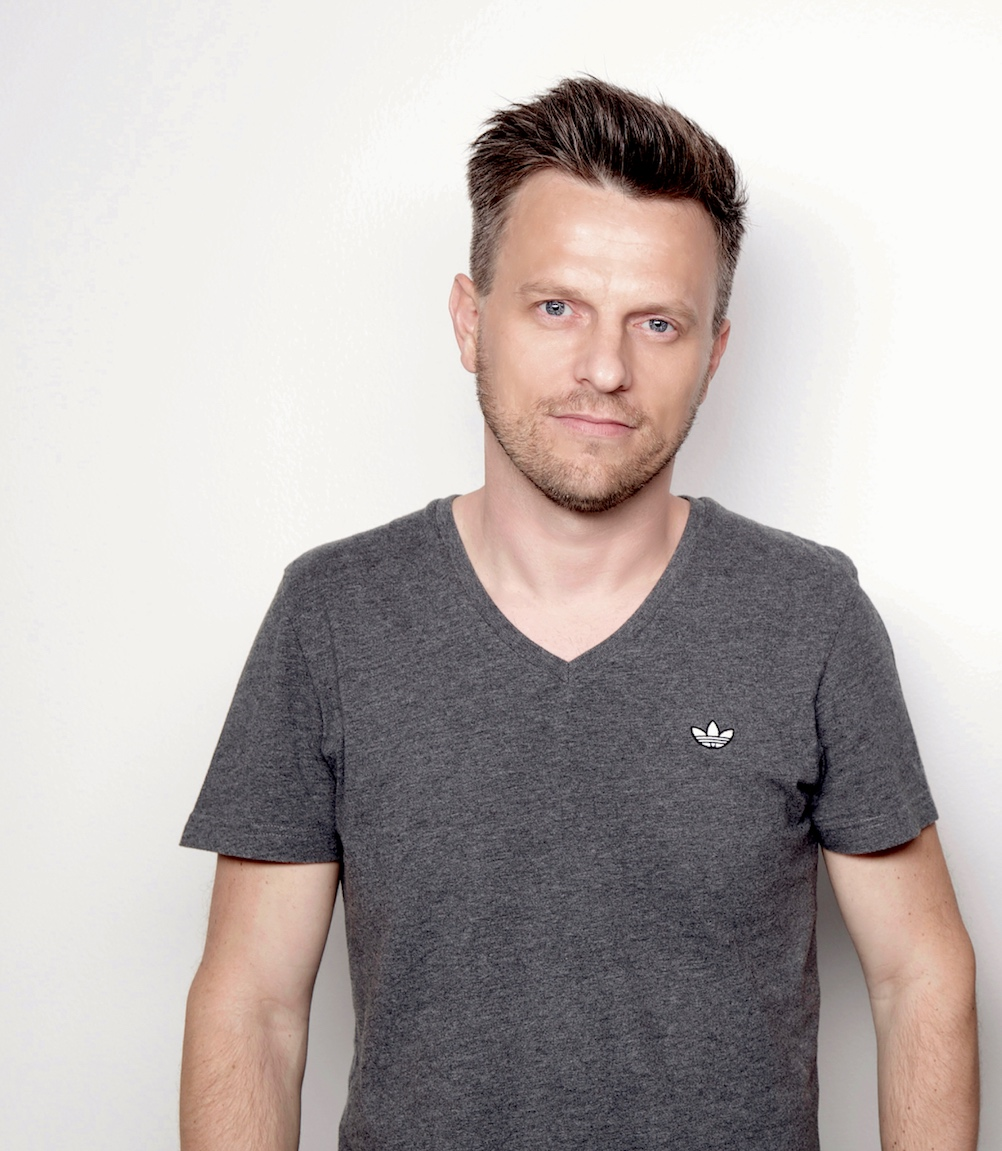

Background information
- Birth name: Greg Peter Stainer
- Born: 17 May 1976 (age 49); London, England
- Origin: London, England
- Genres: Speed Garage, tech house, House music, electro house, garage
- Occupation(s): Disc jockey, producer
- Years active: 1999–present
- Labels: Sony Music, Universal Music Group, Armada Music, Ultra Music Hed Kandi, Spinnin' Records, Insomniac
- Website: instagram.com/gregstainer

Greg Stainer is an English House and Garage DJ and producer. He is the co-creator and member of the electronic music duo Hollaphonic.

== Career ==
Stainer first appeared on the music scene in the mid-1990s, DJing in London clubs playing UK garage. In 1998, Stainer started producing his music and had his first commercially released track; "Weakness" released in the same year. "Weakness" was a collaboration with MJ Cole which was released on Very Important Plastic (VIP) Records. At this time, Stainer hosted a show on the London pirate radio station London Underground. "Weakness" was featured on Warner Music's Pure Garage compilation album, Pure Garage Rewind Back to the Old Skool mixed by DJ EZ. The CD was released on 3 December 2007, and after two weeks on sale it was awarded a UK gold disc status.

In 2002, Stainer relocated to Dubai, UAE, where he began DJ residencies at various nightclubs in the city and began presenting a house music radio show, "Club Anthems", on UAE Radio 1. He has expanded the "Anthems" themed radio show to a podcast called "Ice Anthems" which can be heard on ICE, an in-flight entertainment system on board the entire passenger fleet of Emirates.

In 2009, Stainer released his first full-length solo album 6mil 2headphones. It peaked at number 7 in the Virgin Megastore Album Charts, and became a top 10 position in DJ Magazine's Middle East & North Africa poll. 6mil 2headphone's namesake came from Stainer's transition from construction labourer in London, England working with a road resurfacing material containing a 6 millimetre stone (commonly referred to as 6mil in the industry) to international stardom as a house DJ. 6mil 2headphones was the first CD to feature Dubai-based house music.

In 2010, he created Stained Music, his record label. Today, Stainer is known as one of the pioneers of the house music scene in the UAE. In 2011, Stainer performed at the Creamfields Abu Dhabi event at Yas Island on the main stage alongside Deadmau5 and Katy B. Stainer is renowned for his bouncy and energetic 4 CDJ sets. His music draws inspiration from elements in all genres of house music. His other achievements in 2010 include being awarded a top 10 position in DJ Magazine's Middle East & North Africa poll.

In 2011, "Piracy Part 2", which was released on Stained Music, received support from the following major artists: Groove Armada, Tocadisco, Peter Gelderblom, Andi Durrant, Olav Basoski and Claude VonStroke.

Stainer was awarded his second gold disc in July 2011 for his production of the Karl Wolf track "Mash It Up" featuring Three 6 Mafia.

The single reached No. 28 on the Billboard Canadian Hot 100 and was certified gold on 26 March 2012.

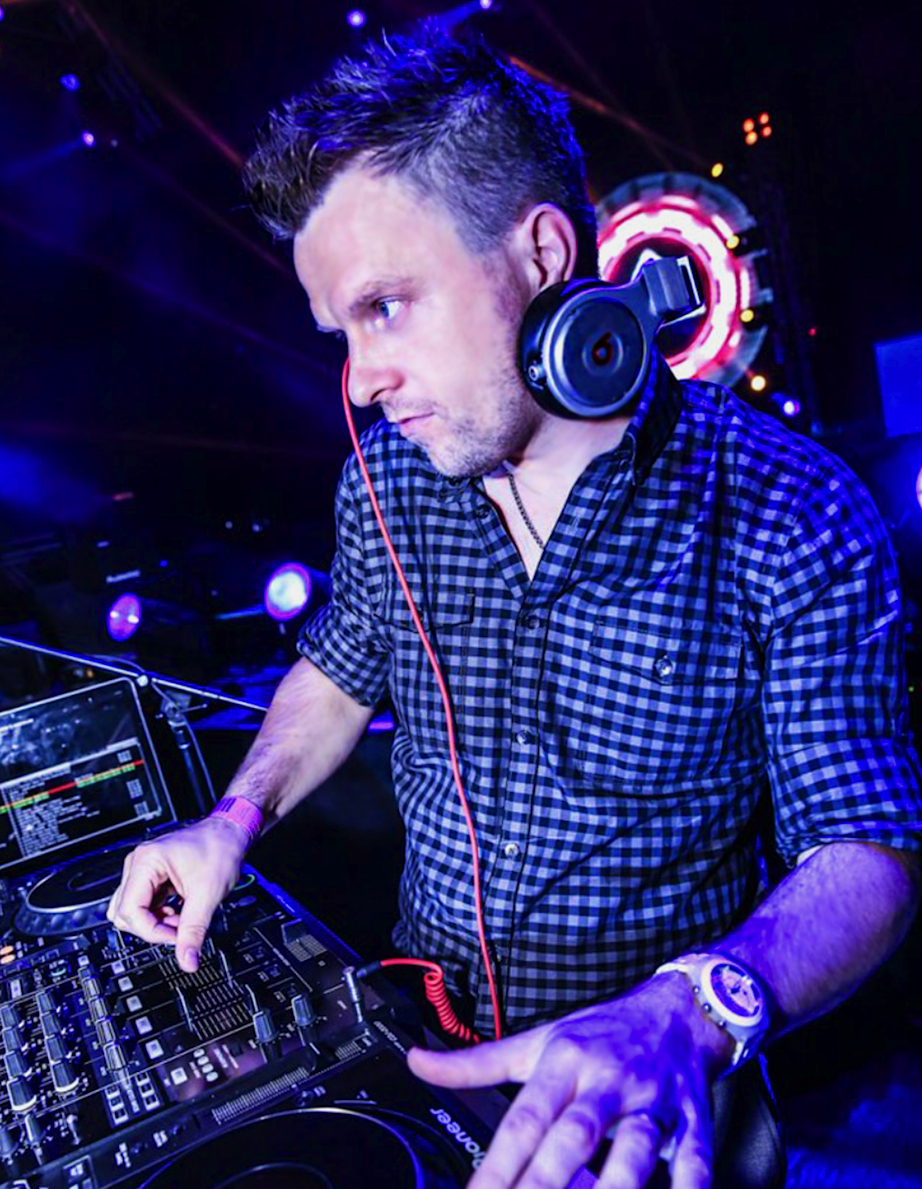
Stainer in 2012

In January 2011, another of Stainer's tracks, "Ride," a collaboration with Oscar P, hit No. 5 on the Billboard Hot Dance Club Play break-out chart. Stainer's music productions have been playlisted by clubs and radio DJs worldwide. His productions and remixes have received high ranking positions in the Beatport and traxsource online music charts.

In 2012, Stainer released the single "Can't Take That Away" on the Hed Kandi label featuring the vocals of Roland Clark. As of December 2012, the single was featured on three Hed Kandi compilations.

Stainer has performed in over 30 cities and across four continents, including New York City, London, Ibiza, India, South Africa, Sweden, Dubai, Ireland, China and Singapore. Stainer has also headlined at venues in the UAE, such as Atelier Festival, Zinc, Armani, creamfields and Nasimi Beach.

In 2012, Stainer formed an electronic music duo with Olly Wood under the name Hollaphonic. The first track they produced, "I Don't Want It to End" was picked up by the record label EMI / Universal Music Group and reached number 1 on the iTunes chart. Hollaphonic subsequently signed a deal to release an album in 2013.

Stainer performed in front of a crowd of 17,000 on New Year's Eve 2012 at the Meydan Racecourse alongside Snoop Dogg, Faithless and Armand Van Helden.

In 2013, Hollaphonic was awarded The Middle East Esquire's "Music Man of the Year".

To date, artists that Stainer has remixed and collaborated with include: Gyptian, Juicy J (Three 6 Mafia), Wiley, MJ Cole, Karl Wolf, Kardinal Offishall, Sway and Robert Owens.
