= Movin' Too Fast =

1999 single by Artful Dodger

Single by Artful Dodger and Romina Johnson

from the album It's All About the Stragglers
- Released: 26 July 1999
- Genre: UK garage
- Length: 3:54
- Label: Locked On
- Songwriters: Orlando Levene Johnson; Fabio Raponi; Ingo Peter Schwartz
- Producer: Artful Dodger

Artful Dodger singles chronology
"What You Gonna Do" (1998)	"Movin' Too Fast" (1999)	"Re-Rewind" (1999)
"Re-Rewind" (1999)	"Movin' Too Fast" (2000)	"Woman Trouble" (2000)

"Movin' Too Fast" is a song by UK garage duo Artful Dodger, released on 26 July 1999. The song features Romina Johnson and was included on the duo's debut studio album, It's All About the Stragglers (2000). "Movin' Too Fast" was originally recorded by Johnson as a solo artist and appears on her 1998 debut album, Simply Passion, produced by Rolando Bacci Hardage, Marco Petriaggi and Alessandro Barocchi. The Artful Dodger remix version of the track was first distributed as a white label vinyl release. After it was picked up by DJs, it was licensed to Locked On for mainstream distribution.

"Movin' Too Fast" did not appear on the UK Singles Chart following its original release, but after the success of "Re-Rewind", it was re-issued in February 2000 and reached No. 2. The song has gone platinum in the United Kingdom for sales and streams exceeding 600,000. Outside the UK, the single reached the top 40 in Ireland and Norway as well as on the Canadian RPM Top 30 Dance chart. Capital Xtra included the song in their list of "The Best Old-School Garage Anthems of All Time".

== Track listings ==
UK 12-inch single (1999)

A1. "Movin' Too Fast" (Artful Dodger original mix)
AA1. "Movin' Too Fast" (Artful Dodger dark dub)
AA2. "Movin' Too Fast" (Dark Dodger artful dub)

UK 12-inch single (2000)

A1. "Movin' Too Fast" (Bump & Flex vocal) – 6:30
A2. "Movin' Too Fast" (original mix) – 6:29
B1. "Movin' Too Fast" (Pussy 2000 vocal) – 6:48

UK CD and cassette single

1. "Movin' Too Fast" (radio mix) – 3:56
2. "Movin' Too Fast" (Bump & Flex vocal) – 6:30
3. "Movin' Too Fast" (Pussy 2000 vocal) – 6:48

== Charts ==
=== Weekly charts ===
Chart (2000)	Peak position
Australia (ARIA)	111
Belgium (Ultratop 50 Flanders)	41
Canada Dance/Urban (RPM)	15
Europe (Eurochart Hot 100)	13
Germany (GfK)	63
Ireland (IRMA)	21
Italy Airplay (Music & Media)	7
Netherlands (Single Top 100)	57
Norway (VG-lista)	18
Scottish Singles Sales (Official Charts)	9
UK Singles (Official Charts)	2
UK Dance (Official Charts)	1
UK Indie (Official Charts)	1

=== Year-end charts ===
Chart (2000)	Position
UK Singles (OCC)	30

== Certifications ==
Region	Certification	Certified units/sales
United Kingdom (BPI)	Platinum	600,000^{‡}
^{‡} Sales+streaming figures based on certification alone.

== Release history ==
Region	Date	Format(s)	Label(s)	Ref.
United Kingdom	26 July 1999	12-inch vinyl	Locked On	
United Kingdom (re-release)	21 February 2000	12-inch vinyl; CD; cassette	Locked On	

== Cover versions ==
In 2018, the House & Garage Orchestra featuring Kayla Amor on vocals recorded an orchestral version for the UK garage covers album Garage Classics.

In 2019, a version by DJ Spoony with Katie Chatburn and the Ignition Orchestra featuring Paloma Faith on vocals was released as a promo single for the UK garage covers album Garage Classical.

In July 2020, former Britain's Got Talent contestant and Love Island winner Paige Turley released a version of the song as her debut single. The record was recorded with the House & Garage Orchestra (a project featuring Luck & Neat producer Shy Cookie in a manner similar to Pete Tong's recordings with Jules Buckley and the Heritage Orchestra) and was released by New State Music.
