= Mark Hill (musician) =

Welsh musician, songwriter and record producer (born 1972)

- Also known as: Mark Hill; Artful
- Born: Mark Leslie Hill; 22 December 1972 (age 53); Cwmbran, Wales
- Genres: UK garage; R&B; house; 2-step
- Occupations: Musician; songwriter; record producer; DJ
- Years active: 1990s–present
- Labels: Fagin; Centric; Public Demand; Workhouse; FFRR; London; Sound Proof; 60hz
- Website: www.markhillmusic.com

Mark Leslie Hill (born 22 December 1972) is a Welsh musician, songwriter and record producer. He rose to fame as a member of the duo Artful Dodger and co-writer and producer of Craig David's multi-platinum debut studio album, Born to Do It. Since he began releasing music in 1997, Hill has achieved four Ivor Novello Awards, a number one album, two number one singles and over 10 million records sales worldwide.

== Early life ==
Hill got his first guitar at eight years old; he would play along to the radio and immerse himself in songs by artists such as Stevie Wonder and George Benson. Throughout his early years and teens, Hill played the drums in brass bands, rock bands and orchestras, but the plan was to study to become an architect. After persuasion from his music teacher and uncle to also study music (and with the prospect of a seven-year degree becoming less appealing), Hill moved to Southampton to study music at university. After joining a band as a percussionist, he and the bass player from the band decided to go into business together by setting up a recording studio. It was through the brief trading period of the studio that Hill met future latter half of Artful Dodger, Pete Devereux. They produced several speed garage bootlegs, and, while working as DJs, they met Craig David.

== Career ==
Artful Dodger recorded "Re-Rewind (The Crowd Say Bo Selecta)" with Craig David on vocals. It was released by Relentless Records, after signing the track from Public Demand, and it peaked at number two in the UK Singles Chart in 1999.

Artful Dodger continued to create successful tracks following the success of "Re-Rewind", with "Movin' Too Fast" (featuring Romina Johnson), being picked up by Locked on Records and "Woman Trouble" (featuring Craig David and Robbie Craig), being signed up by Pete Tong's FFRR label. This was followed by the debut studio album, It's All About the Stragglers. In 2001, this incarnation of Artful Dodger ended. While working on the Artful Dodger album, Hill started and ran a record label under Universal Records, with Lucian Grainge, known as Sound Proof.

Following the completion of Craig David's Born to Do It, Hill bought a house in Ibiza and set up his own studio there. He started working with David on his second studio album, while living and working as a DJ on the island. Hill retained an interest in developing emerging UK talent and he formed The stiX, a live band, featuring Michelle Escoffery, Lifford and Corinne Bailey Rae.

Hill subsequently took a break from music, getting married, having three children and focussing on other business ventures. Music had become a pastime rather than a career, but he returned to the studio in the late 2000s. By 2011, Hill was back as Artful, releasing new music on his own label, Workhouse Records.

On 11 November 2011, Mark together with Ridney, were invited by Matt "Producer Matt" Auckland to join Voice FM, presenting a new two hour dance music show. The Global House Party, (formerly known as the Artful & Ridney Show), airs every Friday across Southampton on 103.9 Voice FM, and syndicated worldwide to 15 stations in six countries. This ended after 300+ episodes on 1 May 2018 after the death of Matt "Producer Matt" Auckland.

== Discography ==
=== Albums ===
- Rewind (March 2000) Mix CD
- It's All About the Stragglers (November 2000) No. 18 UK

=== Singles ===
All of their subsequent hit singles have also been collaborations:

Year	Title	Chart positions	Album
Year	Title	UK Singles Chart	Album
1997	"The Revenge of Popeye"	—	Non-album singles
1997	"Something" (featuring Craig David)	—	Non-album singles
1998	"If You Love Me" – Mark Hill	—	Non-album singles
1998	"The Messenger"	—	Non-album singles
1998	"What You Gonna Do" (featuring Craig David)	2	It's All About the Stragglers
1999	"Movin' Too Fast" (featuring Romina Johnson)	2	It's All About the Stragglers
1999	"Re-Rewind (The Crowd Say Bo Selecta)" (featuring Craig David)	2	It's All About the Stragglers
2000	"Woman Trouble" (featuring Craig David)	6	It's All About the Stragglers
2000	"Movin' Too Fast (Remix)" (featuring Romina Johnson)	2	It's All About the Stragglers
2000	"Woman Trouble" (featuring Robbie Craig and Craig David)	6	It's All About the Stragglers
2000	"Please Don't Turn Me On" (featuring Lifford)	4	It's All About the Stragglers
2001	"Think About Me" (featuring Michelle Escoffery)	11	It's All About the Stragglers
2001	"TwentyFourSeven" (featuring Melanie Blatt)	6	It's All About the Stragglers
2001	"It Ain't Enough" (Dreem Teem, Coco Star vs. Artful Dodger)	20	It's All About the Stragglers
2002	"Ladies" (featuring General Levy and Roachie)	—	Non-album singles
2003	"Ruff Neck Sound" (featuring Richie Dan and Sevi G)	—	Non-album singles
2006	"Flex" (featuring Vula)	—	Non-album singles
2011	"Could Just Be the Bassline" (featuring Kal Lavelle)	—	Non-album singles
2012	"Do What We Do" (with Ridney featuring Aaron James Cashell)	—	Non-album singles
2012	"Rhapsody" (with Ridney)	—	Non-album singles
2013	"Architect" (featuring Cairo)	—	Unfinished Business EP
2013	"Wasteman"	—	Unfinished Business EP
2013	"He Loves Me" (featuring Terri Walker)	—	Unfinished Business EP
2013	"Quick"	—	Unfinished Business EP
2013	"Planes, Trains & Migraines"	—	Unfinished Business EP
2013	"Missing You" (with Ridney featuring Terri Walker, co-written Donae'o)	—	Non-album single
