= Crazy Love (MJ Cole song) =

2000 single by M. J. Cole

Single by MJ Cole

from the album Sincere
- B-side: "Attitude"
- Released: 24 April 2000
- Studio: Prolific
- Genre: UK garage
- Label: Talkin' Loud; Mercury
- Songwriters: Matt Coleman; Elisabeth Troy Antwi
- Producer: MJ Cole

MJ Cole singles chronology
"Sincere" (1998)	"Crazy Love" (2000)	"Sincere (reissue)" (2000)

Music video
- "Crazy Love" on YouTube

"Crazy Love" is a song by UK garage musician MJ Cole, released on 24 April 2000 as the second single from his debut album Sincere. Elisabeth Troy Antwi provides vocals on the song. The song peaked at No. 10 on the UK Singles Chart, No. 1 on the UK Dance Singles Chart, and No. 17 in Iceland. In the United States, exactly one year after its UK release, the song was serviced to rhythmic radio and reached No. 22 on the Billboard Dance Club Songs chart.

In 2019, DJ Spoony together with Katie Chatburn and the Ignition Orchestra featuring Emeli Sandé on vocals recorded an orchestral version of the song for the UK garage covers album Garage Classical. In March 2019, for Dummy Mag, the Heartless Crew included "Crazy Love" in their list of "The 10 Best UK Garage Tunes".

== Background ==
Cole has said that although he didn’t initially expect the song to be a hit, he believed in keeping the production authentic and felt that Crazy Love captured something “true” to his vision of UK garage’s musical possibilities.

== Critical reception ==
Melody Maker praised “Crazy Love” upon release, calling it “sumptuous two-step” with a vocal that “lends a heartbreaking edge to MJ Cole’s intricate production.” The Independent praised Sincere, noting Crazy Love as a “recent hit … reflective mood,” highlighting Elisabeth Troy’s vocal performance as giving the song a grace and musicality often missing from more commercial cuts. Music Week called it “a defining UK garage single” in its reviews column, predicting strong mainstream impact due to its “memorable vocal and finely polished strings.”

Crazy Love is viewed as one of the tracks that defined the crossover moment of UK garage, appreciated for its polished production and melodic vocal lines.

== Track listings ==
UK CD single

1. "Crazy Love" (radio edit) – 3:33
2. "Attitude" – 5:23
3. "Crazy Love" (Todd Edwards Discofied 2000 remix) – 6:19
4. "Crazy Love" (video)

UK 12-inch single

A1. "Crazy Love" – 4:38
A2. "Crazy Love" (Todd Edwards Save Your Crys dub) – 6:29
B1. "Attitude" – 5:23

US 12-inch single

A1. "Crazy Love" (Riprock 'N' Alex G radio edit) – 3:33
A2. "Crazy Love" (Todd Edwards Discofied 2000 vocal mix) – 6:19
A3. "Crazy Dubb" – 5:23
B1. "Crazy Love" (London Underground main mix) – 6:13
B2. "Sincere" (Naked Music Jay's Breakfast dub) – 6:09

== Credits and personnel ==
Credits are taken from the UK CD single liner notes.

Studios

- Recorded at Prolific Studios
- Mixed at Soho Recording Studios (London, England)
- Artwork designed at Intro (London, England)

Personnel

- MJ Cole – writing (as Matt Coleman), production, mixing, engineering
- Elisabeth Troy Antwi – writing, vocals
- Alan Mawdsley – assistant mix engineering
- Michael Williams – art direction
- Merton Gauster – photography

== Charts ==
=== Weekly charts ===
Chart (2000–2001)	Peak position
Europe (Eurochart Hot 100)	44
Iceland (Íslenski Listinn Topp 40)	17
Scotland Singles (OCC)	52
UK Singles (OCC)	10
UK Dance (OCC)	1
US Dance Club Play (Billboard)	22

=== Year-end charts ===
Chart (2000)	Position
UK Singles (OCC)	190

== Certifications ==
Region	Certification	Certified units/sales
United Kingdom (BPI)	Silver	200,000^{‡}
^{‡} Sales+streaming figures based on certification alone.

== Release history ==
Region	Date	Format(s)	Label(s)	Ref.
United Kingdom	24 April 2000	12-inch vinyl; CD; cassette	Talkin' Loud; Mercury	
United States	24 April 2001	Rhythmic contemporary radio	Talkin' Loud; Island	
