= It's All About the Stragglers =

Studio album by Artful Dodger
- Released: 20 November 2000
- Recorded: 1998–2000
- Genres: UK garage; 2-step
- Length: 51:20
- Labels: London; Sire
- Producers: Artful Dodger; Crash & Burn

Singles from It's All About the Stragglers
- 1. "What You Gonna Do" Released: 1998; 2. "Movin' Too Fast" Released: 26 July 1999; 3. "Re-Rewind (The Crowd Say Bo Selecta)" Released: 29 November 1999; 4. "Woman Trouble" Released: 3 July 2000; 5. "Please Don't Turn Me On" Released: 13 November 2000; 6. "Think About Me" Released: 2001; 7. "It Ain't Enough" Released: 2001; 8. "TwentyFourSeven" Released: 3 September 2001 (version featuring Melanie Blatt)

It's All About the Stragglers is the only studio album by the English garage duo Artful Dodger, released on 20 November 2000 by London Recordings. The album contains eight different vocalists, including Craig David.

== Production ==
The album was recorded on a small budget in the empty production studios of the Ocean Radio Group near Fareham, Hampshire, then owned by Capital Radio. One of those stations in the group was Power FM where the band also hosted a weekend dance show and headlined the 2000 day festival Power in the Park.

== Critical reception ==
Professional ratings
Review scores
Source	Rating
AllMusic	2/5 stars
The Encyclopedia of Popular Music	4/5 stars
Entertainment Weekly	B
The Province	3/5 stars
Rolling Stone	3.5/5 stars
The Sun-Herald	4/10

The A.V. Club wrote: "Artful Dodger has always represented the lighter side of two-step, but without other artists' tracks to counter its airy levity, It's All About The Stragglers is a middling effort that makes for a less-than-thrilling introduction to an otherwise thrilling genre." Exclaim! thought that "Craig David effortlessly commands the pulsing groove of 'Whatcha Gonna Do'." Billboard called It's All About the Stragglers an "R&B-conscious, club-rooted, classically arranged album". The Chicago Tribune opined that "chances are that teens will be befuddled by the studio geekery and dance experts will scoff at its conscious fluffiness, but tunes like 'Think About Me' are an apt reminder that not all contemporary pop has to be a guilty pleasure to be fun."

== Track listing ==
UK CD version

No.	Title	Writer(s)	Length
1.	"Think About Me" (featuring Michelle Escoffery)	Mark Hill; Escoffery	4:36
2.	"Re-Rewind" (featuring Craig David)	Hill; David	4:03
3.	"Outrageous" (featuring Lynn Eden)	Hill; Eden; Pete Devereux	4:15
4.	"Please Don't Turn Me On" (featuring Lifford)	Hill; Conner Reeves	3:43
5.	"TwentyFourSeven" (featuring Nicole)	Hill; Escoffery	3:49
6.	"Something" (featuring Lifford)	Hill; David; Devereux; Neil Kerr	4:19
7.	"Movin' Too Fast" (with Romina Johnson)	Johnson; Ingo Peter Schwartz; Fabio Raponi	3:56
8.	"R U Ready" (featuring MC Alistair)	Hill; David; Devereux; Alistair Julius	4:39
9.	"I Can't Give It Up" (featuring Nadia)	Hill; Justin Oliver; Tony Brady; Leo	4:03
10.	"Woman Trouble" (with Robbie Craig featuring Craig David)	Hill; David; Devereux; Craig	4:02
11.	"What You Gonna Do?" (featuring Craig David)	Hill; David; Devereux	4:01
12.	"We Should Get Together" (featuring Nadia)	Oliver; Brady; Leo	4:04

- (tracks 13–98 no audio)

Bonus track

No.	Title	Writer(s)	Length
99.	"Woman Trouble" (original version; with Robbie Craig featuring Craig David)	Hill; David; Devereux; Craig	5:28

US version

No.	Title	Writer(s)	Length
1.	"Think About Me" (featuring Michelle Escoffery)	Hill; Escoffery	4:35
2.	"Re-Rewind" (radio edit; featuring Craig David)	Hill; David	4:02
3.	"Outrageous" (featuring Lynn Eden)	Hill; Eden; Devereux	4:14
4.	"Please Don't Turn Me On" (radio edit; featuring Lifford)	Hill; Reeves	3:43
5.	"TwentyFourSeven" (radio version; featuring Melanie Blatt)	Hill; Escoffery	3:48
6.	"Something" (featuring Lifford)	Hill; David; Devereux; Kerr	4:18
7.	"Movin' Too Fast" (featuring Romina Johnson)	Johnson; Schwartz; Raponi	3:54
8.	"R U Ready" (featuring MC Alistair)	Hill; David; Devereux; Julius	4:39
9.	"I Can't Give It Up" (featuring Nadia)	Hill; Oliver; Brady; Leo	4:03
10.	"Woman Trouble" (radio edit; featuring Robbie Craig and Craig David)	Hill; David; Devereux; Craig	4:00
11.	"What You Gonna Do?" (featuring Craig David)	Hill; David; Devereux	4:00
12.	"It Ain't Enough" (radio edit; with Dreem Teem featuring MZ May and MC Alistair)	Hill; Devereux; Susan Brice	3:41
13.	"We Should Get Together" (featuring Nadia)	Oliver; Brady; Leo	4:06
14.	"Think About Me" (Artful Dodger 3 Step mix)	Hill; Escoffery	5:29
15.	"Please Don't Turn Me On" (Artful Dodger UK Garage remix)	Hill; Reeves	5:44

== Personnel ==
Adapted from the album's liner notes.

- Artful Dodger (Mark Hill and Pete Devereux) – production on all tracks
- Crash & Burn – production on "I Can't Give It Up" and "We Should Get Together"

== Charts ==
=== Weekly charts ===
Weekly chart performance for It's All About the Stragglers
Chart (2000)	Peak position
Australian Albums (ARIA)	53
Scottish Albums (Official Charts)	52
UK Albums (Official Charts)	18

=== Year-end charts ===
Year-end chart performance for It's All About the Stragglers
Chart (2000)	Position
UK Albums (OCC)	66
Chart (2001)	Position
UK Albums (OCC)	110
