= Wideboys =

English electronic music duo

The Wideboys
- Genres: Electronic dance music; UK garage
- Years active: 1996–present
- Labels: World Wide Phonographics; Zentek Records; Ministry of Sound
- Members: Eddie Craig; Jim Sullivan

The Wideboys are an English electronic music duo known for club remixes and for their own song "Sambuca", featuring Dennis G on vocals, which reached number 15 in the UK in October 2001. Another top 40 single, "Daddy-O" featuring Shaznay Lewis, reached No. 32 in 2008.

The Wideboys compose and release many of their own productions, especially favouring the 12-inch vinyl format for club DJs. In 1998, they began producing dance remixes of songs by other artists, which led to fame in 2000 for two remixes featuring Craig David on vocals: "Re-Rewind" and "Woman Trouble", both by Artful Dodger. With this success, they began to remix songs by more widely known artists such as Kylie Minogue, Rihanna, Girls Aloud, Taio Cruz and the Pussycat Dolls. In 2009, they initiated a series of dance mix albums on the Ministry of Sound label. They are also known for composing the theme tune for Wheeler Dealers.

== See also ==
- List of songs remixed by Wideboys
