= Hollaphonic =

British electronic dance music production and DJ duo

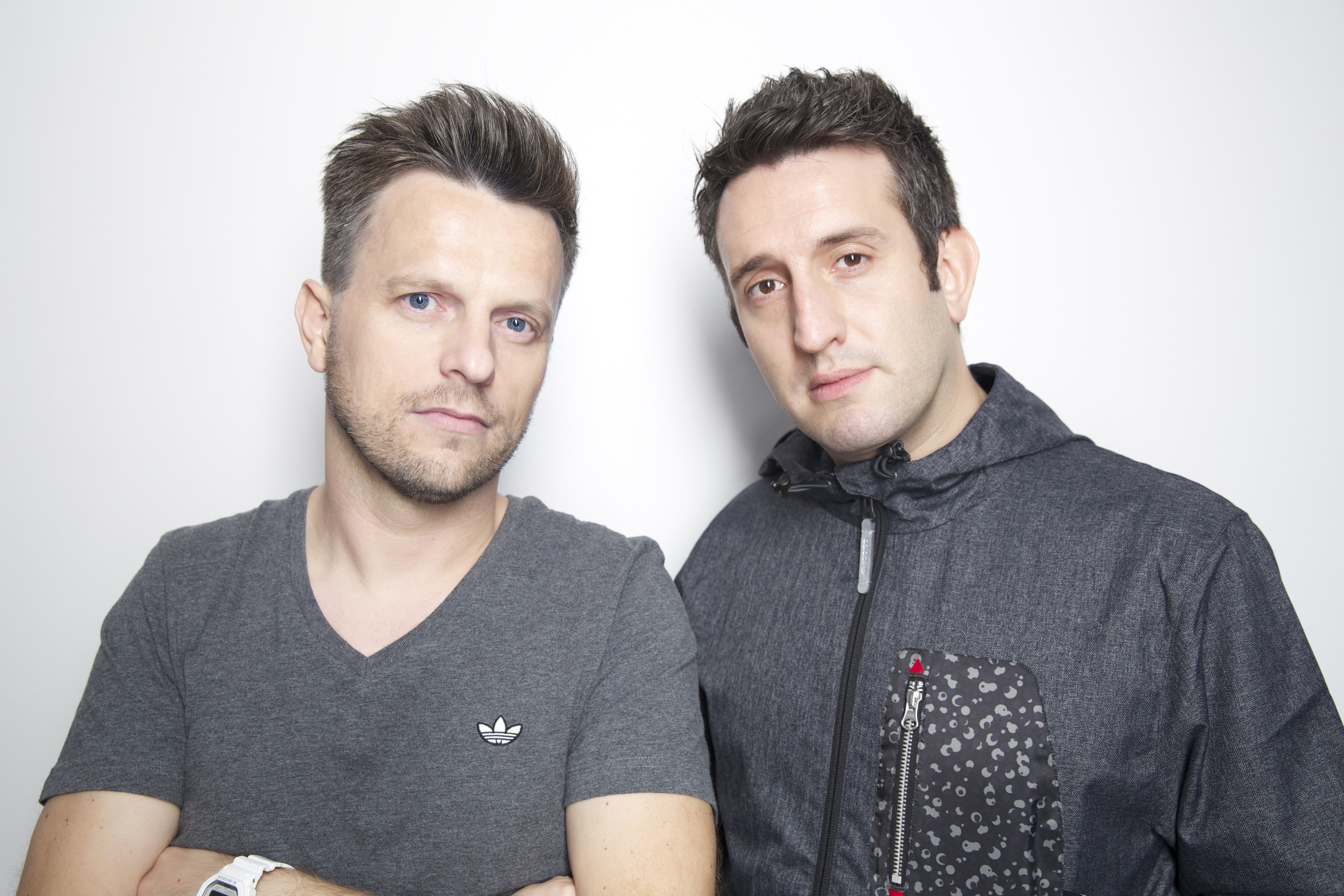
- Greg Stainer & Olly Wood AKA Hollaphonic press photo taken in 2014

Background information
- Origin: England, UK
- Genres: Tech house, deep house, electro house
- Years active: 2012–present
- Label: Universal Music Group Sony Music Spinnin' Records Insomniac Records
- Members: Greg Stainer; Olly Wood
- Website: hollaphonic.com

Hollaphonic are a British electronic dance music production and DJ duo, consisting of Greg Stainer and Olly Wood. They were the first dance music duo to be signed to a major record label in the Middle East.

== Music career ==
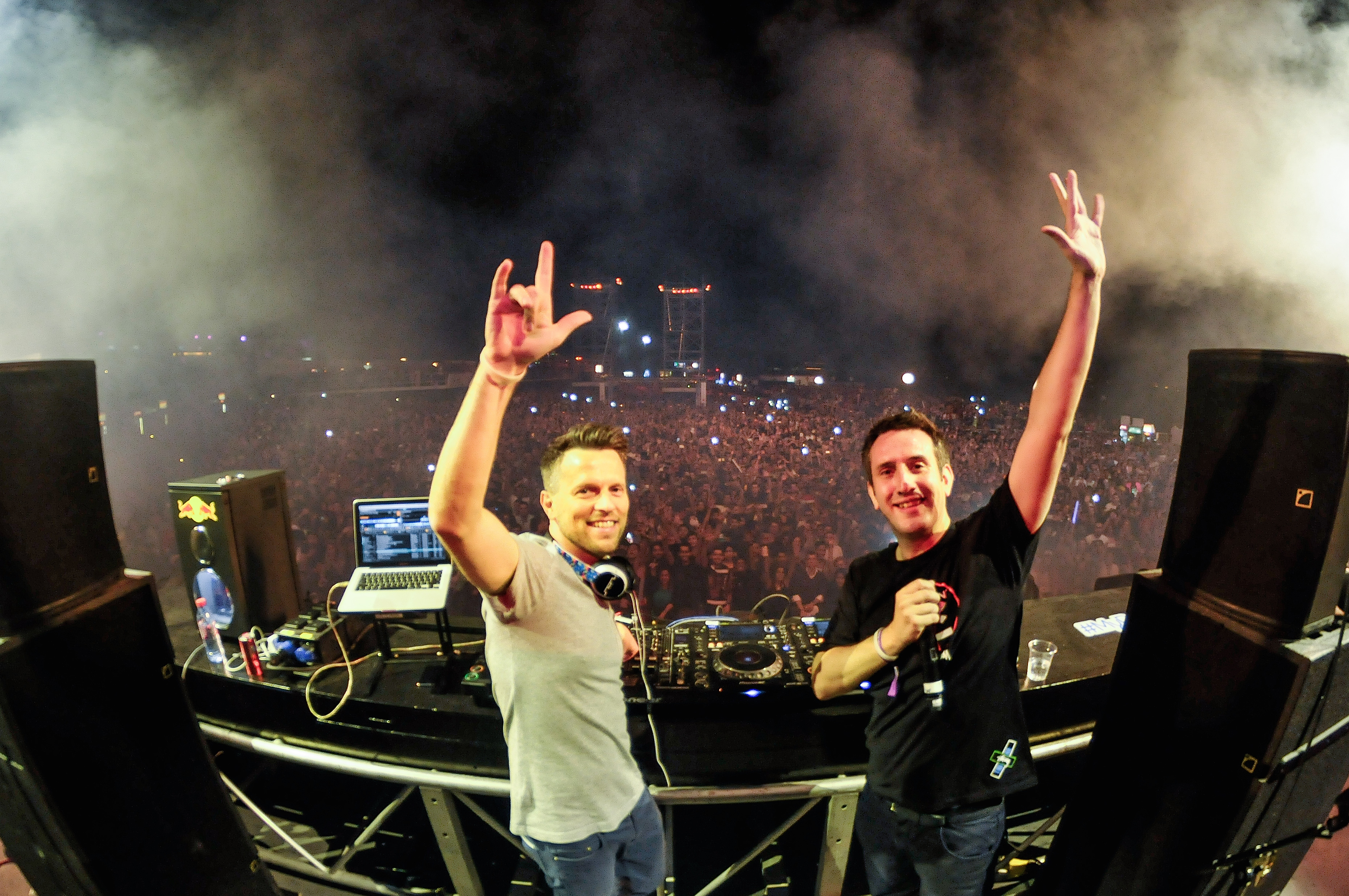
Hollaphonic performing at Sandance festival in Dubai

Their first single, “I Don’t Want It to End”, was released in February 2013 by Universal Music Group. It was ‘A’ listed on all national radio stations in the UAE and went to No. 1 on iTunes.

Olly Wood has written songs and performed as an MC in the south coast UK garage scene as well as around the UK and abroad with Dub Pistols. Wood was selected by Gulf Business as one of “the top 30 under 30 young achievers across the Middle East” for his work with emerging talent.

In March 2013, Hollaphonic performed their first gig together before a crowd of 40,000 at the Dubai World Cup Night at Meydan Racecourse alongside Seal. In December that year, Hollaphonic performed on the main stage ahead of headliners Calvin Harris, The Prodigy and Disclosure at Creamfields Abu Dhabi.

Their debut album, Personal Space, was launched at a party hosted by Adidas Originals. The album eventually reached No. 1 on the iTunes pre-order dance chart.

In March 2014, they received Best Dubai Act at the honorary Time Out Dubai Night Life Awards. They also won Man at His Best 2013 in the Music category at the Esquire awards.

In November 2014, they performed at the Formula One after-race concert in du Arena on Yas Island, sharing the bill with DJ Armin van Buuren.

Performing to a sell-out crowd ahead of David Guetta at the Live at Atlantis concert on Friday, 19 December, Hollaphonic posed with an audience of 12,000 for UAE’s biggest selfie.

Hollaphonic performed alongside Major Lazer and DNCE at Fiesta De Los Muertos in Dubai for Halloween 2016.

Hollaphonic created the music for the Emirates Airline welcome video for their in-flight entertainment system ICE, which would feature at the start of every flight worldwide for five years. They are name-checked at the end of the video.

Mercedes and Hamdan bin Mohammed Al Maktoum worked with Hollaphonic to produce a soundtrack for their viral video entitled Defy Your Limits.

Hollaphonic was announced as the opening act for Pink at the 2017 Abu Dhabi Grand Prix for the last race of the Formula One Grand Prix.

They were on the main stage line-up of Creamfields in Abu Dhabi alongside Above & Beyond, Deadmau5 and Axwell & Ingrosso in December 2017.

Hollaphonic became one of the first international acts to be signed to Tencent and Sony Music joint venture Liquid State, a pure electronic dance music label based out of Shanghai and featuring artists such as Alan Walker, Seungri, zhu, Li Yuchun, and Nicholas Tse.

Hollaphonic became the first resident DJs in an airport as part of Dubai Airport #MusicDXB program, also run by Hollaphonic owned Holla Sonic. The airport has over 250,000 passengers travelling through every day.

== Discography ==
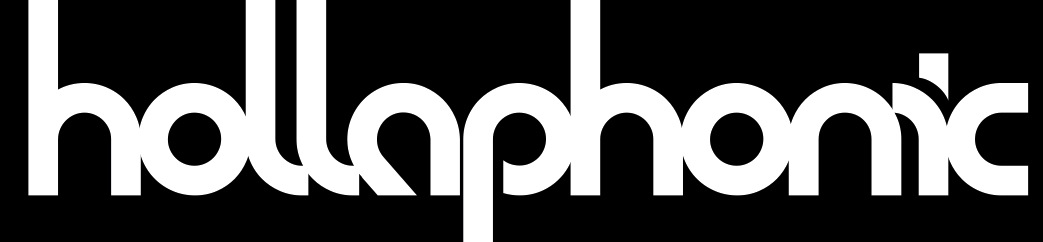
Hollaphonic Logo

=== Albums ===
Title	Released	Record label	Additional information
Personal Space	2015	Universal Music Group	Peaked at number 1 on ITunes

=== Extended plays ===
Title	Released	Record label	Additional information
Stand Up	2020	Sirup Records	

=== Singles ===
Title	Released	Record label	Additional information
"I Don't Want It to End"	2013	Universal Music Group	featuring Shaduno
"Found You (Stay Alive)"	2013	Universal Music Group	featuring Dia
"Fabric"	2014	Universal Music Group	featuring Kevin Murphy
"Runaway"	2014	Universal Music Group	featuring Aaron Camper
"Dangerous"	2015	Universal Music Group	featuring Vince Kidd
"Turn the Lights Down"	2016	Universal Music Group	featuring Stephon LaMar
"Surrounded by Bass"	2016	YosH Records	
"Don't Walk Away"	2017	Somn'thing Records	featuring Quino & Brit Chick
"Spaceship"	2017	Sony Music	featuring Bxrber
"Nobody Like You"	2018	GMM Grammy	featuring Palitchoke Ayanaputra (Peck)
"New Ones"	2018	Sony Music	featuring Aaron Camper
"Shut Up"	2019	Sony Music	featuring Jasmine and Jazee Minor
"Save Me"	2020	Spotify Radar campaign	featuring Xriss Jor
"Wicked & Lazy"	2020	Spinnin' Deep	
"Together"	2020	IN/Rotation	
"Sunglasses At Night"	2021	Controversia	Collaboration with Alok (DJ)
"Visions"	2021	Controversia	with Fflora
"Better Days"	2021	Good Company Records	
"Cant Get Enough"	2021	Tomorrowland Music	
"Hold On"	2021	IN/Rotation	
"Parana"	2022	Tomorrowland Music	
"Ahora Compredo"	2022	The Myth of NYX	Collaboration with Nome
"Boomye"	2022	Techne	

=== Remixes ===
Artist	Track	Released	Record label	Additional information
Sigma	"Glitterball"	2015	3 Beat	featuring Ella Henderson
Philip George	"Wish You Were Mine"	2015	3 Beat	
Nathalie Saba	"Black Birds"	2016	Sony Music	
Dirty Vegas	"Reckless"	2016	D:Vision	
Paul Oakenfold, Eve, and Baby G	"What's Your Love Like"	2020	Perfecto Records	

== Chart positions ==
Their debut album Personal Space held the No. 1 and No. 2 spot from pre-order to release with both the standard and limited edition releases.

In 2015 their track, "Surrounded by Bass", had a top 20 position on the Amsterdam Dance Event (ADE) BUZZCHART. The track was also played on BBC Radio 1 with MistaJam and Capital FM by Coco Cole. This track went on to be released on UK label Yosh in 2016 managed by the UK bass group Foor.

== Awards ==
- 2015 - Motivate Publishing's Hype Magazine Best Producer
- 2014 & 2015 - Time Out Dubai Best Dubai Act
- 2013 - Esquire Middle East Man at His Best Music Award
