= London Underground FM =

Pirate radio station (1995–2001)

- England
- Broadcast area: London
- Frequency: 89.4 FM

Programming
- Format: House, UK garage

History
- First air date: 1995-2002

London Underground FM was a mid-1990s to early-2000s pirate radio station in London.

== History ==
London Underground FM started broadcasting in 1995, from East London, primarily on 89.4 FM. It mostly played house and garage, and was one of the first radio stations to champion UK garage.

The following UK garage DJs and producers started out at London Underground: MJ Cole, Dreem Teem (Timmi Magic and DJ Spoony), Ramsey & Fen, Norris "Da Boss" Windross, Jason Kaye, Hermit, Daryl B, Emma Feline, David Howard, Greg Stainer, Matt "Qualifide" Campbell, Lisa, Nortee B Nice,Dj Freddy, Jason H, Danny Foster, and Richie Fingers.

What initially set the station apart from its rivals was the MC free zone policy and its group of producers. It strived for professionalism with well mastered jingles and a policy of DJs who could host their shows. The station also became known for supporting the UK garage label V.I.P. (Very Important Plastic).

In 1997, it hosted the second arena at the World Dance New Year Eve rave night, at Wembley Entertainment Centre, and again in 1998, at the Three Mills Island Studios, Three Mills Lane Bow, London E3. The same year, it was taken off air for several months, before returning. On its return, a core group of its original members had left the station, due to their commercial success as well as the shift in the garage music sound, from a four to the floor (4x4) beat pattern to two step (2-step).

By now, the station attracted DJs and MCs from other stations, and new talent, along with a few original members: Mr Buzzhard, Jason H & Shax (The Clairvoyants), Matt "Qualifide" Campbell, Rossi B and Luca, MC Skanker, TNT Express, Easy G, Mr D, Leona H, Paradise & MC Richie Rich, Half Pint, Angie B, Scratcha DVA, Pioneer, and many other performers.

Throughout the early 2000s, the station hosted a room at "Smoove", Ministry of Sound, and Colin McMillan's "4Play", held at Legends nightclub.

London Underground FM finally came to a close around 2002.
