= B.Traits =

Canadian DJ, record producer, remixer and radio presenter

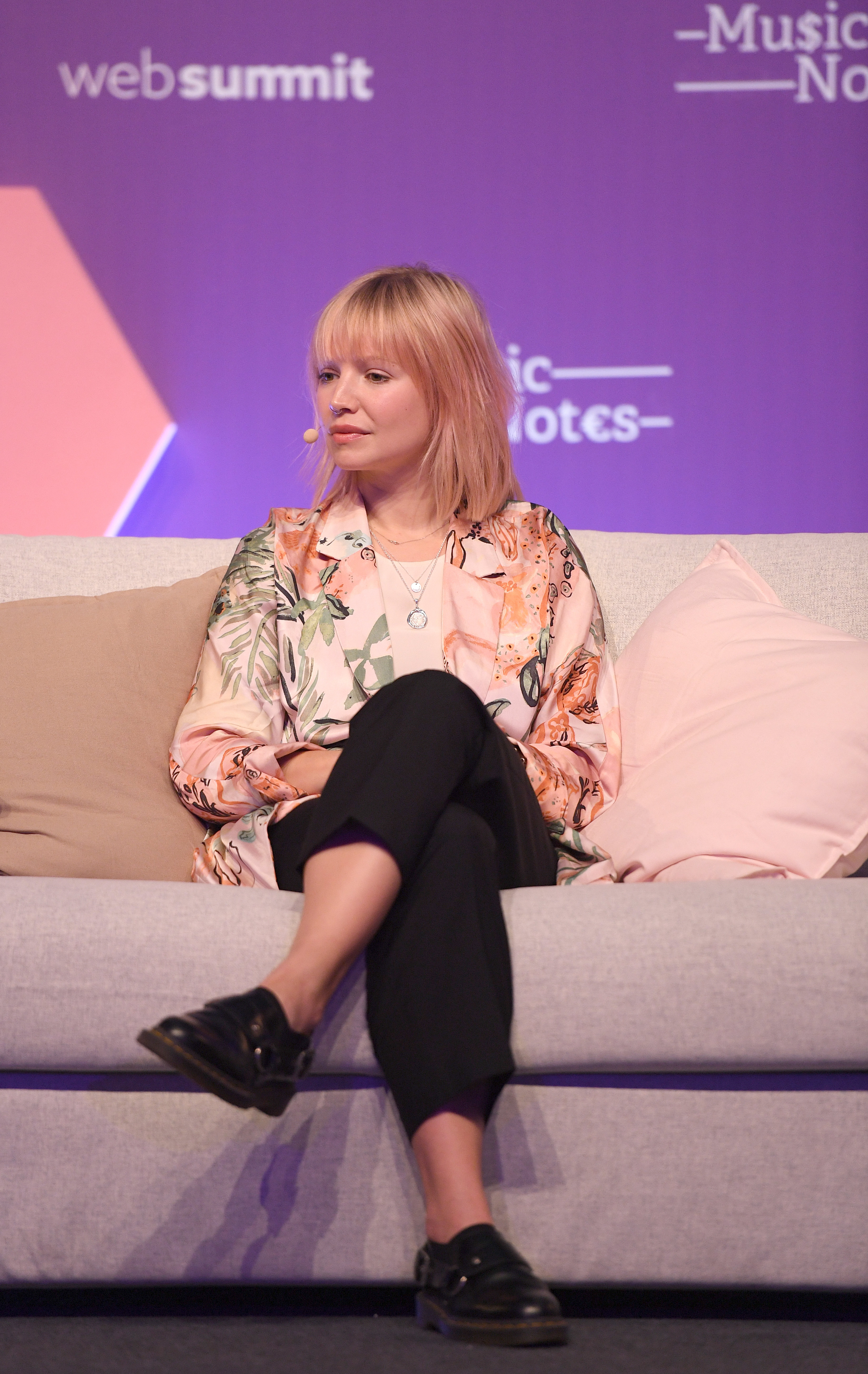
- B.Traits at Web Summit in 2018

Background information
- Born: Brianna Price; 18 June 1986 (age 40); Nelson, British Columbia, Canada
- Origin: Canada; United Kingdom
- Genres: EDM; breakbeat; house; techno
- Occupations: DJ; producer; radio presenter; remixer
- Instruments: Turntable; sampler
- Years active: 2006–present
- Labels: Digital Soundboy; 'In-Toto'
- Website: www.btraits.com

Brianna Price (born 18 June 1986), better known by her stage name B.Traits (Baby Traits), is a Canadian DJ, record producer, remixer and former radio presenter currently living in the United Kingdom. Her debut single "Fever" featuring vocals from Elisabeth Troy, peaked at number 36 on the UK Singles Chart in April 2012.

== Biography ==
B.Traits was born in Nelson, British Columbia. In 2004, at the age of 18, she moved to Vancouver, where she started to make a name for herself at clubs such as Automatic, the longest running drum & bass club night in Canada, and soon began picking up regular bookings throughout North America and Europe. In 2006, she met drum & bass pioneer and founder of Digital Soundboy, Shy FX while on the World of Drum n' Bass tour, and in September 2007, was recruited by Shy to become the first Digital Sound Girl. On 23 March 2012, she released her debut single "Fever", which features vocals from Elisabeth Troy. She went on to host her own monthly "In New DJs We Trust" show on BBC Radio 1. Her first live show of the programme was on 3 May 2012. From 10 September 2012 she started hosting another BBC Radio 1 show which aired on Mondays, from 2 am to 4 am, also simulcast on BBC Radio 1Xtra. From May 2013 until September 2013, she covered for Annie Mac on BBC Radio 1 on Friday and Sunday evenings, while Mac was on maternity leave. Subsequently, she had a weekly show on Tuesday mornings from 2 am until 4 am. From September 2014, she has moved to her current weekly slot as part of Friday night on BBC Radio 1, broadcasting from 1 am until 4 am. She currently lives in the Hyde Park area in London.

In December 2014, she was the presenter of a special on BBC Three entitled How Safe Are My Drugs?, in which she explores the culture of drugs, both legal and illegal, in the rave community of the United Kingdom.

In September 2016, she announced her record label entitled 'In-Toto'.

In October 2018, Price announced she was leaving Radio 1 to focus on new projects.

== Music career ==
=== 2012–present: Debut single ===
On 23 March 2012, she released her debut single "Fever" which featured vocals from Elisabeth Troy. On 1 April 2012, it entered the UK Singles Chart at number 36, making it her first Top 40 single in the UK.

== Discography ==
=== Singles ===
Year	Title	Peak chart positions		Album
Year	Title	UK	UK Dance	Album
2012	"Fever" (feat. Elisabeth Troy)	36	8	

=== EPs ===
Year	Title	
Year	Title	Label
2016	Still Point	InToto

Year	Title	
Year	Title	Label
2017	Basic Scenario	InToto

== Filmography ==
=== Radio ===
Year	Title	Role	Slot	Station	Notes
2012	In New DJs We Trust	DJ	21:00–22:00 Thursday	BBC Radio 1	1 episode
2012–2014	B.Traits	Presenter	02:00–04:00 Mondays	BBC Radio 1	
2012–2014	B.Traits	Presenter	02:00–04:00 Tuesdays	BBC Radio 1	
2014–2018	B.Traits	Presenter	01:00–04:00 Saturdays	BBC Radio 1	
