= TwentyFourSeven (song) =

2001 single by Artful Dodger featuring Melanie Blatt

Single by Artful Dodger featuring Melanie Blatt

from the album All Hits
- Released: 3 September 2001
- Length: 3:48
- Label: FFRR; Public Demand
- Songwriters: Michelle Escoffery; Mark Hill
- Producer: Artful Dodger

Artful Dodger singles chronology
"Think About Me" (2001)	"TwentyFourSeven" (2001)	"It Ain't Enough" (2001)

"TwentyFourSeven" is a song by UK garage duo Artful Dodger. The first version of the song is included on their debut studio album It's All About the Stragglers (2000), and features a singer named Nicole. The single version features All Saints member Melanie Blatt and was released on 3 September 2001, peaking at number six on the UK Singles Chart. Since it was recorded just before the split of All Saints, it was decided to include this song on the group's All Hits album as well.

Artful Dodger initially consisted of Mark Hill and Pete Devereux, but Devereux left prior to the release of the single "TwentyFourSeven", making this the first single of Artful Dodger as a stage name for Mark Hill.

== Music video ==
The music video for "TwentyFourSeven", directed by Jamie Morgan, has a springtime feel about it with Melanie Blatt sitting in a rattan chair with a dog.

== Track listings ==
UK CD1

1. "TwentyFourSeven" (radio version)
2. "TwentyFourSeven" (Grant Nelson remix)
3. "TwentyFourSeven" (Another Dub-A-Holics Injection dub featuring Miss Shorte-E)
4. "TwentyFourSeven" (video)

UK CD2

1. "TwentyFourSeven" (Another Dub-A-Holics Injection vocal featuring Miss Shorte-E)
2. "TwentyFourSeven" (Pale Face mix)
3. "TwentyFourSeven" (behind the scenes footage)

UK cassette single

1. "TwentyFourSeven" (radio version)
2. "TwentyFourSeven" (Grant Nelson remix)

European CD single

1. "TwentyFourSeven" (radio version) – 3:48
2. "TwentyFourSeven" (Another Dub-A-Holics Injection dub featuring Miss Shorte-E) – 7:27

Australian CD single

1. "TwentyFourSeven" (radio version)
2. "TwentyFourSeven" (Grant Nelson remix)
3. "TwentyFourSeven" (Another Dub-A-Holics Injection dub featuring Miss Shorte-E)

== Charts ==
=== Weekly charts ===
Chart (2001)	Peak position
Belgium (Ultratip Bubbling Under Flanders)	16
Belgium (Ultratip Bubbling Under Wallonia)	16
Europe (Eurochart Hot 100)	32
Ireland (IRMA)	41
Scotland Singles (OCC)	16
UK Singles (OCC)	6

=== Year-end charts ===
Chart (2001)	Position
UK Singles (OCC)	144

== Release history ==
Region	Date	Format(s)	Label(s)	Ref.
United Kingdom	3 September 2001	CD; cassette	FFRR; Public Demand	
Australia	8 October 2001	CD	FFRR; Public Demand	
