= A Little Bit of Luck =

1999 single by DJ Luck & MC Neat

Single by DJ Luck & MC Neat

from the album A Little Bit of Luck
- Released: 13 December 1999
- Genre: UK garage
- Length: 5:51
- Label: Red Rose
- Songwriters: DJ Luck & MC Neat
- Producers: DJ Luck & MC Neat

DJ Luck & MC Neat singles chronology
"A Little Bit of Luck" (1999)	"Masterblaster 2000" (2000)

"A Little Bit of Luck" is a song by English UK garage duo DJ Luck & MC Neat. The song contains samples of "Unity", a 1991 breakbeat hardcore track by Timebase featuring Kromozone, interpolated vocals from Yami Bolo's "When a Man in Love", and uses the drums from an earlier garage track, "Hyperfunk" by Antonio. The song reached the top 10 on the UK Singles Chart, peaking at number nine. It was the first of three consecutive top-10 hit singles for the duo.

== Legacy ==
In 2017, DJ Luck & MC Neat featured on the track "Through the Night" by rapper Bugzy Malone from his EP King of the North, using resung vocals from "A Little Bit of Luck". It reached No. 92 in the UK. In September 2019, NME included the song in their "25 essential UK garage anthems" list. Capital Xtra included the song in their list of "The Best Old-School Garage Anthems of All Time". In 2018, the House & Garage Orchestra together with MC Neat recorded an orchestral version for the UK garage covers album Garage Classics.

== Track listings ==
UK CD, 12-inch, and CD single

1. "A Little Bit of Luck" (original) – 5:51
2. "A Little Bit of Luck" (Dreem House remix) – 4:44
3. "A Little Bit of Luck" (Oracles remix) – 4:22
4. "A Little Bit of Luck" (DJ Luck & Shy Cookie remix) – 4:46

Australian and New Zealand CD single

1. "A Little Bit of Luck" (radio edit) – 3:34
2. "A Little Bit of Luck" (original mix) – 5:50
3. "A Little Bit of Luck" (Dreem House remix) – 4:46
4. "A Little Bit of Luck" (Oracles remix) – 4:24
5. "A Little Bit of Luck" (DJ Luck & Shy Cookie remix) – 4:48

== Charts ==
=== Weekly charts ===
Chart (1999–2000)	Peak position
Europe (Eurochart Hot 100)	45
Scottish Singles Sales (Official Charts)	38
UK Singles (Official Charts)	9
UK Dance (Official Charts)	1

=== Year-end charts ===
Chart (2000)	Position
UK Singles (OCC)	81

== Certifications ==
Region	Certification	Certified units/sales
United Kingdom (BPI)	Platinum	600,000^{‡}
^{‡} Sales+streaming figures based on certification alone.
