= Sincere (MJ Cole album) =

Studio album by MJ Cole
- Released: 7 August 2000
- Recorded: 1997–2000
- Genres: UK garage; house
- Length: 72:20
- Label: Talkin' Loud

MJ Cole chronology
Sincere (2000)	Back to Mine (2002)

Professional ratings
Aggregate scores
Source	Rating
Metacritic	71/100
Review scores
Source	Rating
AllMusic	3/5 stars

Sincere is the debut studio album by English musician MJ Cole. It was released on 7 August 2000 under the Talkin' Loud label. The album reached number 14 on the UK Albums Chart in August 2001. It was included in the book 1001 Albums You Must Hear Before You Die.

== Track listing ==
No.	Title	Music	Length
1.	"Introduction" (featuring Nova Casper)	Matt Coleman	3:12
2.	"Tired Games" (featuring Elisabeth Troy)	Matt Coleman; Guy S'mone; Elisabeth Troy	4:59
3.	"Attitude" (featuring Elisabeth Troy)	Matt Coleman; Guy S'mone; Elisabeth Troy	5:23
4.	"Bandelero Desperado"	Matt Coleman	4:00
5.	"MJ FM Interlude" (featuring Elisabeth Troy)	Matt Coleman; Elisabeth Troy	2:05
6.	"Crazy Love" (featuring Elisabeth Troy)	Matt Coleman; Elisabeth Troy	4:38
7.	"You're Mine"	Matt Coleman; Guy S'mone	6:14
8.	"Sanctuary"	Matt Coleman	4:16
9.	"I See" (featuring Elisabeth Troy)	Matt Coleman; Guy S'mone; Elisabeth Troy	4:47
10.	"Sincere (Re-Cue'd)" (featuring Nova Casper)	Matt Coleman	5:38
11.	"Strung Out"	Matt Coleman	3:03
12.	"Rough Out Here"	R. Brown	4:20
13.	"Slum King"	Matt Coleman	5:29
14.	"Radio Interlude"	Matt Coleman; Rick Davies	0:43
15.	"Hold on to Me" (featuring Elizabeth Troy)	Matt Coleman; Elisabeth Troy; Guy S'mone	4:41
16.	"Free My Mind" (featuring Guy S'mone)	Matt Coleman; Guy S'mone	4:41
17.	"Crazy Love" (featuring Elisabeth Troy)	Matt Coleman; Elisabeth Troy	3:34
18.	"Sincere" (featuring Nova Casper)	Matt Coleman	6:51

== Certifications ==
Region	Certification	Certified units/sales
United Kingdom (BPI)	Silver	200,000^{^}
^{^} Shipments figures based on certification alone.
