= Sincere (song) =

Single by MJ Cole

from the album Sincere
- Released: May 1998
- Genre: UK garage
- Label: Metrix; AM:PM; Talkin' Loud
- Songwriter: Matt Coleman
- Producer: MJ Cole

MJ Cole singles chronology
"Sincere" (1998)	"Crazy Love" (2000)

"Sincere" is the debut single by English UK garage musician MJ Cole, released in May 1998. It features Nova Casper and Jay Dee on vocals. The song initially peaked at No. 38 on the UK Singles Chart, but a re-release in 2000 containing new mixes (following the success of Cole's second single, "Crazy Love") proved even more successful, peaking at No. 13. It also reached No. 1 on the UK Dance Singles Chart.

Two orchestral versions were recorded for two UK garage cover albums, the first in 2018 by the House & Garage Orchestra (featuring Camden Cox on vocals) for the album Garage Classics and the other in 2019 by DJ Spoony with Katie Chatburn and the Ignition Orchestra (featuring Hamzaa) for Garage Classical.

== Background ==
In DJ Mag, Cole says the title track “Sincere” was made in his bedroom at his parents' house using ambient pads, ghostly vocal fragments, and warm harmonic textures, favoring musicality and atmosphere over the more aggressive energy common in UK garage at that time. The song was pieced together from sample CDs and finished in Cole's studio later, layering Rhodes and ambient touches as final elements.

== Critical reception ==
Terry Matthew of 5 Magazine called it a “UK garage classic,” crediting it with helping define the genre’s melodic, soulful wing and praising its remixes for broadening its legacy. Passion of the Weiss framed “Sincere” as “both ecstatic and mournful,” noting how it pushed garage toward a more emotional register without losing dancefloor weight.

== Impact and legacy ==
In November 2016, UK duo Gorgon City compiled a list of their top UK garage songs for Billboard, with "Sincere" at #10.

The Guardian listed "Sincere" at number 2 in their list of "The best UK garage tracks - ranked!" in 2019.

In 2017, Mixmag included "Sincere" in their list of the "12 best late-90s UK garage records", and in 2019 included the song in their list of "40 of the best UK garage tracks released from 1995 to 2005".

Redbull.com included the song in their list of "10 underground UK garage classics that still sound fresh today".

Gemtracks included the song in their list of the "top UK garage songs between 1995–2005".

== Track listing ==
UK 12" single (1998)
A1. "Sincere" (vocal mix)
A2. "Sincere" (dub mix)
AA1. "Sincere" (MJ's Wild Side remix)
AA2. "Sincere" (MJ's Wild Side instrumental)

UK CD single (1998)

1. "Sincere" (radio edit)
2. "Sincere" (vocal mix)
3. "Sincere" (MJ's Wild Side remix)
4. "Sincere" (The Black Science house ride)
5. "Sincere" (dub mix)
6. "Sincere" (The Black Science hip hop ride)

UK 12" (remixes) (2000)
A. "Sincere" (Re-Cue'd)
B. "Sincere" (Mig's Petalpusher vocal)
C. "Sincere" (Jazzanova Sincerely Yours remix)
D. "Sincere" (Naked Music Jay's Breakfast dub)

UK CD single (2000)

1. "Sincere" (radio edit)
2. "Sincere" (Wookie remix)
3. "Sincere" (Jazzanova Sincerely Yours remix)
4. Video

== Charts ==
=== Weekly charts ===
Chart (1998)	Peak position
UK Singles (Official Charts)	38
UK Dance (Official Charts)	1
Chart (2000)	Peak position
Europe (Eurochart Hot 100)	48
UK Singles (Official Charts)	13
UK Dance (Official Charts)	3
