= Master Blaster (Jammin') =

1980 single by Stevie Wonder

Single by Stevie Wonder

from the album Hotter than July
- B-side: "Master Blaster" (instrumental) (7-inch); "Master Blaster" (dub) (12-inch)
- Released: September 12, 1980
- Recorded: 1980
- Genre: Reggae
- Length: 6:11 (12-inch); 5:08 (album); 4:49 (7-inch)
- Label: Tamla
- Songwriter: Stevie Wonder
- Producer: Stevie Wonder

Stevie Wonder singles chronology
"Outside My Window" (1980)	"Master Blaster (Jammin')" (1980)	"I Ain't Gonna Stand for It" (1980)

Audio video
- "Master Blaster (Jammin')" (album version) on YouTube

Professional ratings
Review scores
Source	Rating
Billboard	(favourable)

"Master Blaster (Jammin')" is a 1980 song by American singer-songwriter Stevie Wonder, released as the lead single from his nineteenth studio album, Hotter than July (1980). It was a major hit, spending seven weeks at number one on the US Billboard R&B singles chart, reaching number five on Billboard's pop singles chart in the fall of 1980 and peaking at number two on the UK Singles Chart, number two in Australia (Australian Music Report chart) and number one in New Zealand.

== History ==
The song, built on a heavy reggae feel, is an ode to reggae legend Bob Marley; Wonder had been performing live with Marley (billing him as an opening act) on his US tour in the fall of that year. Lyrics mention "children of Jah", "Marley's Hot on the box" and the end of the civil war in Zimbabwe. The song has a similar feel to Marley's own song "Jamming," from his 1977 album Exodus.

Record World said that it combines "topical urban street themes with reggae-pop rhythms."

== Personnel ==
- Stevie Wonder – vocals, Fender Rhodes, clavinet
- Nathan Watts – bass
- Benjamin Bridges – guitar
- Dennis Davis – drums
- Earl DeRouen – percussion
- Isaiah Sanders – organ
- Hank Redd – saxophone
- Larry Gittens – trumpet
- Rick Zunigar – guitar
- Background vocals – Angela Winbush, Alexandra Brown Evans, Shirley Brewer, Marva Holcolm

== Charts ==
=== Weekly charts ===
Chart (1980–1981)	Peak position
Australia (Kent Music Report)	2
Austria (Ö3 Austria Top 40)	1
Belgium (Ultratop 50 Flanders)	3
Canada Top Singles (RPM)	22
Finland (Suomen virallinen lista)	10
Ireland (IRMA)	3
Netherlands (Dutch Top 40)	2
Netherlands (Single Top 100)	2
New Zealand (Recorded Music NZ)	1
Norway (VG-lista)	4
Spain (AFE)	10
Sweden (Sverigetopplistan)	1
Switzerland (Schweizer Hitparade)	1
UK Singles (Official Charts)	2
US Billboard Hot 100	5
US Hot R&B/Hip-Hop Songs (Billboard)	1
US Dance Club Songs (Billboard)	10
US Cash Box Top 100	1
West Germany (GfK)	9

=== Year-end charts ===
Chart (1980)	Position
Australia (Kent Music Report)	27
Belgium (Ultratop)	9
Netherlands (Dutch Top 40)	11
Netherlands (Single Top 100)	18
New Zealand (RIANZ)	19
Switzerland (Schweizer Hitparade)	13
UK Singles (OCC)	25
US Cash Box Top 100	38

Chart (1981)	Position
US Billboard Hot 100	69
US Hot Soul Singles (Billboard)	2

== Certifications ==
Region	Certification	Certified units/sales
Australia (ARIA)	Gold	50,000^{^}
Canada (Music Canada)	Gold	75,000^{^}
New Zealand (RMNZ)	2× Platinum	60,000^{‡}
United Kingdom (BPI)	Silver	250,000^{^}
^{^} Shipments figures based on certification alone.^{‡} Sales+streaming figures based on certification alone.

== DJ Luck & MC Neat version ==
"Masterblaster 2000"

Single by DJ Luck & MC Neat feat. JJ

from the album It's All Good
- Released: May 15, 2000
- Genre: UK garage
- Length: 3:32 (radio mix)
- Label: Red Rose
- Songwriter: Stevie Wonder
- Producer: DJ Luck

DJ Luck & MC Neat singles chronology
"A Little Bit of Luck" (1999)	"Masterblaster 2000" (2000)	"Ain't No Stoppin' Us" (2000)

"Master Blaster (Jammin')" was covered by UK garage duo DJ Luck & MC Neat featuring singer JJ, initially titled as "On da Street" which was released on the Red Rose EP in 1999. The following year, on 15 May 2000, the song was released as a single and retitled as "Masterblaster 2000". This version was a top-five hit, peaking at number five on the UK Singles Chart. It samples the All-Star Remix of "No Diggity" by Blackstreet, which itself samples "As Long as I've Got You" by the Charmels.

In November 2016, UK duo Gorgon City compiled a list of their top UK garage songs for Billboard, with "Masterblaster 2000" at number 29. In 2018, the House & Garage Orchestra together with MC Neat and Oggie recorded an orchestral version for the UK garage covers album Garage Classics.

=== Charts ===
==== Weekly charts ====
Chart (2000)	Peak position
Europe (Eurochart Hot 100)	24
Scottish Singles Sales (Official Charts)	37
UK Singles (Official Charts)	5
UK Dance (Official Charts)	1

==== Year-end charts ====
Chart (2000)	Position
UK Singles (OCC)	149

=== Certifications ===
Region	Certification	Certified units/sales
United Kingdom (BPI)	Silver	200,000^{‡}
^{‡} Sales+streaming figures based on certification alone.
