= Fever (B.Traits song) =

Single by B.Traits featuring Elisabeth Troy
- Released: 23 March 2012
- Recorded: 2011
- Genre: Breakbeat, house
- Length: 4:16
- Label: Digital Soundboy
- Songwriters: Brianna Price; Elisabeth Troy Antwi

B.Traits singles chronology
| "Moments" (2011) | "Fever" (2012) |

Elisabeth Troy singles chronology
| "Properties of Love" (2008) | "Fever" (2012) | "Want My Love" (2014) |

"Fever" is the debut single performed by Canadian DJ and producer B.Traits. It was released on 23 March 2012 as a digital download in the United Kingdom. The song features vocals from British singer Elisabeth Troy. It peaked at number 36 on the UK Singles Chart.

== Music video ==
A music video to accompany the release of "Fever" was first released onto YouTube on 13 March 2012 at a total length of three minutes and three seconds.

== Track listing ==
Digital download
| No. | Title | Length |
|---|---|---|
| 1. | "Fever" | 4:16 |
| 2. | "Fever" (Radio Edit) | 3:18 |
| 3. | "Fever" (B.Traits Roll Out Mix) | 4:16 |
| 4. | "Fever" (Eats Everything Glandular Remix) | 6:47 |
| 5. | "Fever" (Breakage Remix) | 3:39 |
| 6. | "Fever" (dBridge's Delirious Remix) | 5:18 |
| 7. | "Fever" (dBridge's S950 Remix) | 6:04 |
| 8. | "Fever" (Toddla T & DJ Q Remix) | 5:26 |

== Charts and certifications ==
=== Charts ===
| Chart (2012) | Peak position |
|---|---|
| UK Dance (Official Charts) | 8 |
| UK Singles (Official Charts) | 36 |

=== Certifications ===
| Country (provider) | Certification |
|---|---|
| Australia (ARIA) | 2× Platinum |
| Denmark (IFPI) | Platinum |
| New Zealand (RIANZ) | 3× Platinum |
| United Kingdom (BPI) | Platinum |
| United States (RIAA) | 3× Platinum |

== Release history ==
| Region | Date | Format | Label |
|---|---|---|---|
| United Kingdom | 23 March 2012 | Digital download | Digital Soundboy |
