= Please Don't Turn Me On =

2000 single by Artful Dodger

Single by Artful Dodger featuring Lifford

from the album It's All About the Stragglers
- B-side: "R U Ready"
- Released: 13 November 2000
- Genre: UK garage
- Length: 3:44
- Label: FFRR
- Songwriters: Conner Reeves; Mark Hill
- Producer: Artful Dodger

Artful Dodger singles chronology
| "Woman Trouble" (2000) | "Please Don't Turn Me On" (2000) | "Think About Me" (2001) |

"Please Don't Turn Me On" is a song by UK garage duo Artful Dodger, released on 13 November 2000 as the fifth single from the duo's debut studio album, It's All About the Stragglers (2000). The song features singer Lifford (real name Lifford Shillingford), who would later appear as a contestant on the 12th series of Britain's Got Talent. The song peaked at number four on the UK Singles Chart and spent 10 weeks on the chart. It also reached the top 50 in Australia and Ireland, as well as number 90 in Switzerland.

== Track listings ==
UK CD single

1. "Please Don't Turn Me On" (radio edit)
2. "R U Ready"
3. "Please Don't Turn Me On" (UK garage remix)
4. "Please Don't Turn Me On" (video)

UK 12-inch single

A1. "Please Don't Turn Me On" (Wideboys Oyster vocal mix)
B1. "Please Don't Turn Me On" (Erick Morillo's Disco Thang)
B2. "Please Don't Turn Me On" (Stanton Warriors Fabric vocal)

UK cassette single

1. "Please Don't Turn Me On" (radio edit)
2. "R U Ready"

Australian CD single

1. "Please Don't Turn Me On" (radio edit)
2. "Please Don't Turn Me On" (Wideboys Oyster vocal mix)
3. "Please Don't Turn Me On" (Erick Morillo's Disco Thang)
4. "Please Don't Turn Me On" (UK garage remix)

== Charts ==
=== Weekly charts ===
| Chart (2000–2001) | Peak position |
|---|---|
| Australia (ARIA) | 22 |
| Australian Dance (ARIA) | 4 |
| Europe (Eurochart Hot 100) | 13 |
| Ireland (IRMA) | 42 |
| Ireland Dance (IRMA) | 10 |
| Switzerland (Schweizer Hitparade) | 90 |
| Scotland Singles (OCC) | 20 |
| UK Singles (OCC) | 4 |

=== Year-end charts ===
| Chart (2000) | Position |
|---|---|
| UK Singles (OCC) | 121 |

== Certifications ==
| Region | Certification | Certified units/sales |
|---|---|---|
| United Kingdom (BPI) | Silver | 200,000^{‡} |
^{‡} Sales+streaming figures based on certification alone.
