= Woman Trouble =

2000 single by Artful Dodger and Robbie Craig

Single by Artful Dodger and Robbie Craig featuring Craig David

from the album It's All About the Stragglers
- Released: 3 July 2000
- Genre: UK garage
- Length: 3:58 (radio edit)
- Label: FFRR; Public Demand
- Songwriters: Pete Devereux; Mark Hill; Robbie Craig; Craig David
- Producer: Artful Dodger

Artful Dodger singles chronology
"Movin' Too Fast" (2000)	"Woman Trouble" (2000)	"Please Don't Turn Me On" (2000)

Craig David singles chronology
"Fill Me In" (2000)	"Woman Trouble" (2000)	"7 Days" (2000)

Music video
- "Woman Trouble" on YouTube

"Woman Trouble" is a song by Artful Dodger and Robbie Craig featuring British singer Craig David. It reached number six on the UK Singles Chart and peaked within the top 50 in Iceland, Ireland, and New Zealand. In 2015, it earned a silver certification for selling over 200,000 copies in the United Kingdom. Capital Xtra included the song in their list of "The Best Old-School Garage Anthems of All Time".

== Track listings ==
UK CD1

1. "Woman Trouble" (radio edit) – 3:58
2. "Woman Trouble" (Wideboys Pickapocket or Two radio edit) – 3:55
3. "Woman Trouble" (original version CD edit) – 5:27
4. "Woman Trouble" (Sunkids Latin Thumper edit) – 6:13

UK CD2

1. "Woman Trouble" (original version radio edit) – 3:58
2. "Woman Trouble" (radio edit) – 3:58
3. "Woman Trouble" (Sunship Bombastic radio edit) – 5:42
4. "Woman Trouble" (Sunkids Future Discotech edit) – 6:07
5. "Woman Trouble" (video track)

UK cassette single

1. "Woman Trouble" (radio edit) – 3:58
2. "Woman Trouble" (original version radio edit) – 3:58

European CD single

1. "Woman Trouble" (radio edit) – 3:58
2. "Woman Trouble" (Sunkids Future Discotech edit) – 6:07

Australian CD single

1. "Woman Trouble" (radio edit) – 3:58
2. "Please Don't Turn Me On"
3. "Woman Trouble" (original version radio edit) – 3:58
4. "Woman Trouble" (Sunkids Future Discotech edit) – 6:07
5. "Woman Trouble" (Wideboy's Pickapocket or Two radio edit) – 3:55
6. "Woman Trouble" (video track) – 4:10

== Charts ==
=== Weekly charts ===
Chart (2000–2001)	Peak position
Australia (ARIA)	68
Belgium (Ultratip Bubbling Under Flanders)	10
Europe (Eurochart Hot 100)	29
Germany (GfK)	95
Iceland (Íslenski Listinn Topp 40)	25
Ireland (IRMA)	31
Ireland Dance (IRMA)	10
Netherlands (Dutch Top 40 Tipparade)	7
Netherlands (Single Top 100)	63
New Zealand (Recorded Music NZ)	43
Scottish Singles Sales (Official Charts)	19
Switzerland (Schweizer Hitparade)	98
UK Singles (Official Charts)	6
UK Hip Hop/R&B (Official Charts)	2

=== Year-end charts ===
Chart (2000)	Position
UK Singles (OCC)	95

== Certifications ==
Region	Certification	Certified units/sales
United Kingdom (BPI)	Silver	200,000^{‡}
^{‡} Sales+streaming figures based on certification alone.
