= Prexeca Bangers =

Brazilian hip hop group

- Origin: Rio de Janeiro, Brazil
- Genres: Stronda, hip hop, funk carioca
- Years active: 2004-present
- Members: Rodrigo "Fox" Raposo (MC Fox); Vitor "Mãe" Castro (McMãe)

Prexeca Bangers is a Brazilian hip hop group formed in 2004 in Rio de Janeiro, Brazil, by the MC's Rodrigo "Fox" Raposo and Vitor "Mãe" Castro. In 2011 Prexeca Bangers released his first music video for the single "Tem muleh" to promote his album "Strondando a Porra Toda" which was released shortly after.

== History ==
Prexeca Bangers was formed in 2004 in Rio de Janeiro. They recorded several songs quickly becoming known on the internet, with a new musical style called "Stronda Music". They released their first studio album in 2009.

Prexeca Bangers released in late 2010 his single "Samurai Kama-sutra" to promote his second album, Strondando a Porra Toda. On August 23, 2011, Prexeca Bangers released his first music video for the single "Tem muleh", part of the album "Strondando a Porra Toda" which was released shortly after.

On January 5, 2012, they released the singles "Maconheira do Amor" and "Fugi do Hospicio" to promote the album "Hits de Verão" which was released on February 4, 2013.

== Discography ==
=== Albums ===
- Prexeca Bangers (2009)
- Strondando a Porra toda (2011)
- Hitś de Verão (2013)
- Piratão de Inverno (2013) (unreleased)

=== Singles ===
- Samurai do Kama sutra (2010)
- Tem muleh (2011)
- Maconheira do Amor (2012)
- Fugi do Hospicio (2012)

=== Music videos ===
- Tem Muleh (2011)
