= Sambuca (song) =

Single by Wideboys featuring Dennis G
- Released: 15 October 2001
- Recorded: 2001
- Genre: UK garage
- Label: 679; Locked On
- Songwriters: Dennis Gordan; Eddie Craig; Jim Sullivan
- Producer: Wideboys

Wideboys singles chronology
"Knight Rider" (2001)	"Sambuca" (2001)	"She's the One" (2001)

"Sambuca" is a song by British UK garage duo Wideboys, featuring Dennis G on vocals. It was released in October 2001 as a single, and was a top 20 hit, peaking at No. 15 on the UK Singles Chart and No. 1 on the UK Dance Singles Chart. Two later releases, "Sambuca 2006" and "Sambuca 2008" were released on the Garage Jams and All Around the World labels respectively, which featured more remixes of the track. Wideboys have described "Sambuca" as one of their "catchy club tracks", a signature example of their work in UK garage.

== Critical reception ==
In its September 2005 review, NME described "Sambuca" as "Not enough to set your spirits on fire, but sparky nonetheless."

Capital Xtra included the song in their list of "The Best Old-School Garage Anthems of All Time".

== Music video ==
The music video was directed by Shay Ola and premiered on 13 September 2001.

== Track listing ==
UK CD maxi-single

1. "Sambuca" (original radio edit)
2. "Sambuca" (Agent X Flaming Sambuca remix)
3. "Sambuca" (Wideboys heavy mix)

== Charts ==
Chart (2001)	Peak position
Scotland Singles (OCC)	72
UK Singles (OCC)	15
UK Dance (OCC)	1
