= MJ Cole =

English house and garage producer and remixer

- Born: Matthew James Firth Coleman; September 1973
- Origin: London, England
- Genres: House; UK garage
- Occupations: DJ; record producer; musician; remixer
- Years active: 1997–present
- Labels: Talkin' Loud; Prolific
- Website: Prolific Recordings

Matthew James Firth Coleman, better known by his stage name MJ Cole, (born September 1973) is an English garage DJ, recording artist, record producer and remixer.

== Career ==
Born in London, in his youth, Cole was classically trained on the oboe and piano, and won scholarships to both the Royal College of Music Junior Department and City of London School.

Having graduated from City University, Cole began working at the drum and bass label SOUR, as a tape operator and sound engineer to the likes of FreQ Nasty and Ed Rush. It was working on Ramsey & Fen's 2-step remixes for Kym Mazelle, however, that gave him the garage bug. He was the trusted engineer and lead producer of tracks on the UK garage label V.I.P. (Very Important Plastic) between 1997–1999 and a pirate radio DJ on London Underground FM, alongside the likes of the Dreem Teem.

From there, Cole penned and produced "Sincere" in 1998 using a sampler and Atari, which was eventually picked up by Pete Tong and AM:PM and became one of the earliest garage records to break into the top 40 on the UK singles chart.

He signed with Gilles Peterson's Talkin' Loud label where in 2000 he produced his first album, also called Sincere, which earned him two top 15 singles on the UK singles chart, a prestigious Mercury Music Prize nomination, Brit Award nomination and beat Dr. Dre to win MOBO's Best Producer award in 2001. He received a BPI certification for UK sales in excess of 60,000 copies. Cole formed a live band to accompany his Sincere album performing on Jools Holland's Later Show as well as on Top of the Pops, CD:UK, The Chart Show and at the Mercury Music Prize and MOBO Awards. In 2003, Cole followed Sincere with his Cut to the Chase album, also released via Talkin' Loud.

After leaving Talkin' Loud in 2004, Cole released several singles and EPs via his own Prolific Recordings label. Cole's output on the label has included many notable collaborations including grime artist Wiley and long-time collaborator Elisabeth Troy.

In 2014, he co-wrote and produced "Nobody but You" for Mary J. Blige with Sam Smith and Jimmy Napes, and again in early 2015 on Napes' own Making of Me EP.

He collaborated with T Williams on "Privilege", released in 2015 on Today Records and Tomorrow Records and released "Bouldaz" on Disclosure's Method White label the same year.

Cole continued to produce for artists across the musical spectrum. Dizzee Rascal's "Bassline Junkie", Example's "Something in the Water" and Katy B's "Blue Eyes" were all produced by Cole. He has also remixed tracks for Amy Winehouse, Mariah Carey, De La Soul, Alicia Keys and many more. He released remixes of Jess Glynne's "Hold My Hand" on Atlantic and DJ Fresh and Adam F's "Believer" on Ministry of Sound.

He released "Alcatraz" on Redlight's Lobster Boy Records in early 2016. This was followed by "The Rumble" in August 2016. A hard hitting, genre crossing record featuring hotly tipped UK MC AJ Tracey. Cole said of the record that it was "a slice of London, the energy of now, a fusion of all that is exciting in the U.K. for us".

Through 2017 to 2018, Cole has been releasing a steady selection of singles under the 892 label, including "Pictures in My Head" and "Soak It Up". Some singles would also be accompanied by VIP mixes, also created by Cole. In 2018, he released a new EP entitled "Foundations", stating that the project "takes a step away from my more traditional form of writing".

Cole, alongside The 1975's drummer and electronic musician, George Daniel, co-produced the No Rome track "1:45am" featuring Bearface which released 30 July 2020.

Alongside his producing, writing and remixing work, Cole continues to tour as a DJ at festivals and clubs around the world. Cole has also written and produced scores for several major TV advertising campaigns including the Schwartz "The Sound of Taste" campaign and wrote a piece called "Lava" for O2. Cole was also responsible for the construction and design of a new recording studio complex in Clerkenwell called The Gin Factory.

== Personal life ==
Cole enjoys cycling and has ridden Land's End to John o' Groats.

== Discography ==
=== Albums ===
Title	Details	Peak chart positions	Certifications
Title	Details	UK	Certifications
Sincere	Released: 4 December 2000; Label: Talkin' Loud; Formats: CD, vinyl, digital download, streaming	14	BPI: Silver
Cut to the Chase	Released: 21 April 2003; Label: Talkin' Loud; Formats: CD, vinyl, digital download, streaming	—	
MJ Cole Presents Madrugada	Released: 3 April 2020; Label: Decca; Formats: CD, vinyl, digital download, streaming	—	
"—" denotes a recording that did not chart or was not released.

=== Extended plays ===
Title	Details
Northside / Southside (with Matlok)	Released: December 2007; Label: Prolific; Formats: Vinyl
Battle Stations (with Zed Bias featuring MC Fox)	Released: December 2009; Label: Prolific; Formats: Vinyl
Riddim	Released: 26 April 2010; Label: Prolific; Formats: Vinyl
Satellite	Released: 28 February 2011; Label: Prolific; Formats: Vinyl, digital download, streaming
Southern Electric (with Scrufizzer)	Released: 11 October 2011; Label: Prolific; Formats: Vinyl, digital download, streaming
Panoramic	Released: 19 August 2013; Label: Prolific; Formats: Vinyl, digital download, streaming
Foundations	Released: 26 October 2018; Label: 892 Records; Formats: Digital download, streaming
Waking Up	Released: 27 February 2019; Label: 892 Records; Formats: Digital download, streaming

=== Singles ===
- "Sincere" (1998) – featuring Nova Caspar and Jay Dee – UK No. 38
- "Crazy Love" (2000) – featuring Elisabeth Troy – UK No. 10, BPI: Silver
- "Sincere" (remix) (2000) – UK No. 13
- "Hold On to Me" (2000) – featuring Elisabeth Troy – UK No. 35
- "Wondering Why" (2003) – featuring Vula – UK No. 30
- "Never Say Never" (2004) – featuring Shea
- "When You Said You Loved Me" (2004) – featuring Tubby T
- "Badboy" (2006) – featuring Laura Vane
- "Watertight" (2006) – featuring Laura Vane
- "Gotta Have It" (2009) – featuring Digga
- "From the Drop" (2010) – MJ Cole and Wiley
- "Satellite" (2011)
- "Red and Black" (2012)
- "Bouldaz" (2015)
- "Alcatraz" (2016)
- "The Rumble" (2016) – MJ Cole and AJ Tracey
- "Undo" (2017) – MJ Cole and Alyss
- "Shelter" (2017) – MJ Cole and Bruno Major
- "Interbass" (2017) – MJ Cole and DJ Zinc
- "Pictures in My Head" (2017)
- "Soak It Up" (2018) – MJ Cole and Kojey Radical
- "Homerton B" (remix) (2018) – MJ Cole and Unknown T
- "Waking Up" (2018) – MJ Cole and Freya Ridings

=== Remixes ===
- Flume – "Rushing Back" (MJ Cole remix) (2019)
- Gracey – "Gone" (MJ Cole remix) (2020)
- Disclosure, Kehlani and Syd – "Birthday" (MJ Cole remix) (2020)
