= Elisabeth Troy =

British singer and songwriter

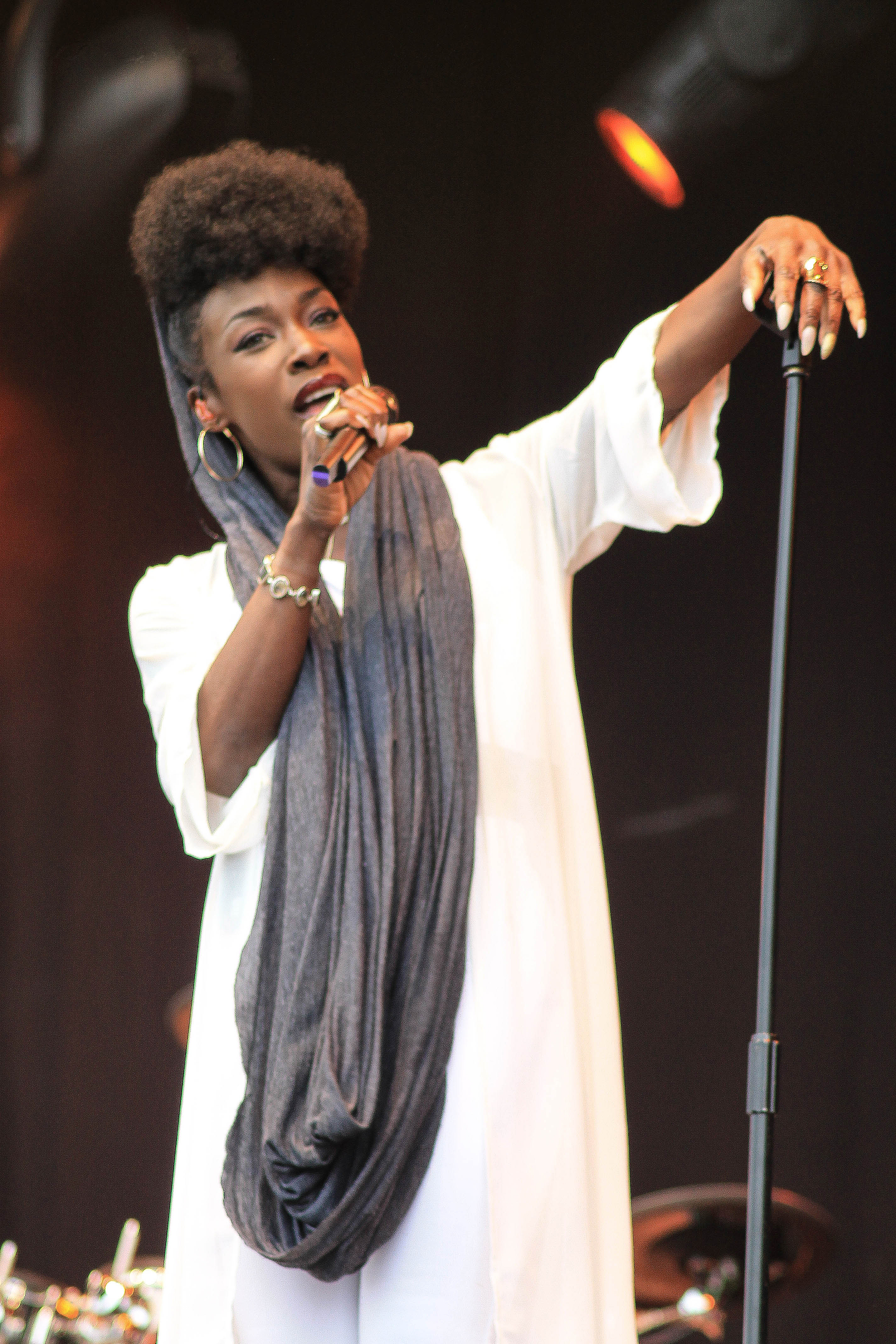
- Troy in 2014

Background information
- Also known as: Elisabeth Antwi
- Born: Elisabeth Troy Antwi; 6 February; England
- Genres: Pop; electropop; dance-pop; uk garage
- Occupations: Singer; songwriter
- Instrument: vocals
- Years active: 1994–present
- Website: elisabethtroy.com

Elisabeth Troy Antwi (born 6 February) is a British singer and songwriter.

She appeared on several top 40 hit singles in the UK, including MJ Cole's "Crazy Love" and "Hold On to Me" in 2000 and B.Traits' "Fever" in 2012. She also co-wrote and performed the 1996 song "Headstrong", which was featured on the soundtrack of the film Mars Attacks!.

She also co-wrote and sang the duet "Incomplete" (as Elisabeth Antwi) with Fish from his 1999 solo album Raingods with Zippos, and provided backing vocals on his 2013 album A Feast of Consequences.

She toured with Clean Bandit from 2013 until 2016.

== Discography ==
=== Singles ===
As main artist

- 1995: "Let Me Be"
- 1996: "Headstrong"
- 1996: "2 Nd Time Around"
- 2001: "Minus 10 Degrees"
- 2002: "4 Vini (Forever Young)" – UK No. 75
- 2007: "Past Love"
- 2008: "Higher Ground"

As featured artist

- 1995: "Greater Love" (with Soundman & Don Lloydie) – UK No. 49
- 1999: "Enough Is Enough" (with Y-Tribe) – UK No. 49
- 2000: "Crazy Love" (with MJ Cole) – UK No. 10
- 2000: "Hold On to Me" (with MJ Cole) – UK No. 35
- 2005: "I Need Your Lovin" (with Martin Ikin & Timmi Magic)
- 2006: "So Damn into You" (with MJ Cole)
- 2008: "Properties of Love" (with Nick Cohen)
- 2012: "Fever" (with B.Traits) – UK No. 36
- 2014: "Want My Love" (with Metrik)
- 2015: "In My Head" (with Girls Love DJs)
- 2016: "Chasing Sunrise" (with Metrik)
- 2016: "Cry" (with Matt Bianco and New Cool Collective)
- 2023: "Ascending Into the Clouds" (with Tiga)
