= Re-Rewind (The Crowd Say Bo Selecta) =

1999 single by Artful Dodger

Single by Artful Dodger featuring Craig David

from the album It's All About the Stragglers
- Released: 29 November 1999
- Genre: UK garage
- Length: 4:02
- Label: Public Demand; Relentless
- Songwriters: Tony Briscoe; Craig David; Mark Hill
- Producers: Mark Hill; Pete Devereux

Artful Dodger singles chronology
"Movin' Too Fast" (1999)	"Re-Rewind (The Crowd Say Bo Selecta)" (1999)	"Movin' Too Fast" (2000)

Craig David singles chronology
"What Ya Gonna Do" (1998)	"Re-Rewind (The Crowd Say Bo Selecta)" (1999)	"Fill Me In" (2000)

Music video
- "Re-Rewind (The Crowd Say Bo Selecta)" on YouTube

"Re-Rewind (The Crowd Say Bo Selecta)" is a song by English garage duo Artful Dodger, featuring Craig David on vocals. Released in the United Kingdom on 29 November 1999, the song reached number two, giving both Artful Dodger and David their first chart hit. In his dean's list for the annual Pazz & Jop critics' poll, Robert Christgau of The Village Voice named "Re-Rewind" the fifth-best single of the year.

== Background ==
The melody in the verses was lifted from an older Craig David demo called "Last Night", which was re-recorded for his debut studio album, Born to Do It. A slightly different version of the song, simply titled "Rewind", was featured on Born to Do It and was credited solely to David. "Re-Rewind" is notable for being the first record signed by influential label Relentless Records and as such the first one to establish the imprint as a pioneering force within mainstream music.

In February 2016, David revealed that, after the recording session, the song was nearly lost forever: "We finished the song and dubbed it onto a little TDK D90 cassette to go and play it in the car," he says. "It sounded good but there was a couple of little tweaks we wanted to do – and literally as [producer Mark Hill] turned the computer on, all we saw was this 'error, file number' message. The only way to get rid of it was to press OK. So we pressed OK, and it kept coming up with new error numbers. So we'd press OK, press OK, press OK. But when we looked at the session, all that we saw was the hi-hats. I was like, 'are you actually for real?' So that plastic TDK tape became gold dust. We had the whole song on there, and we had to use the recording as our reference, playing it very carefully so it didn't get chewed up, and trying to remember all the things we did. And that was 'Re-Rewind'."

== Track listings ==
Standard CD single and UK cassette single

1. "Re-Rewind (The Crowd Say Bo Selecta)" (radio edit)
2. "Re-Rewind (The Crowd Say Bo Selecta)" (Bump 'N' Flex Sweet 'N' Low mix)
3. "Re-Rewind (The Crowd Say Bo Selecta)" (Sharp Club vocal remix)

UK 12-inch single

A1. "Re-Rewind (The Crowd Say Bo Selecta)" (radio edit)
A2. "Re-Rewind (The Crowd Say Bo Selecta)" (Bump 'N' Flex Sweet 'N' Low mix)
B1. "Re-Rewind (The Crowd Say Bo Selecta)" (Sharp Addiction to DTPM dub)

European CD single

1. "Re-Rewind (The Crowd Say Bo Selecta)" (radio edit)
2. "Re-Rewind (The Crowd Say Bo Selecta)" (Sharp Club vocal remix)

US cassette single

1. "Re-Rewind (The Crowd Say Bo Selecta)" (radio edit)
2. "Re-Rewind (The Crowd Say Bo Selecta)" (Sweet n' Low mix)

== Charts ==
=== Weekly charts ===
Chart (1999–2000)	Peak position
Australia (ARIA)	62
Belgium (Ultratop 50 Flanders)	21
Belgium (Ultratip Bubbling Under Wallonia)	17
Europe (Eurochart Hot 100)	11
Germany (GfK)	49
Ireland (IRMA)	15
Italy (FIMI)	18
Netherlands (Dutch Top 40)	4
Netherlands (Single Top 100)	4
New Zealand (Recorded Music NZ)	18
Scotland Singles (OCC)	15
Sweden (Sverigetopplistan)	53
Switzerland (Schweizer Hitparade)	88
UK Singles (OCC)	2
UK Dance (OCC)	1

=== Year-end charts ===
Chart (1999)	Position
UK Singles (OCC)	37

Chart (2000)	Position
Netherlands (Dutch Top 40)	53
Netherlands (Single Top 100)	54
UK Singles (OCC)	83

== Certifications ==
Region	Certification	Certified units/sales
United Kingdom (BPI)	Platinum	600,000^{^}
United Kingdom (BPI) Craig David solo version	Silver	200,000^{‡}
^{^} Shipments figures based on certification alone.^{‡} Sales+streaming figures based on certification alone.

== Release history ==
Region	Date	Format(s)	Label(s)	Ref(s).
United Kingdom	29 November 1999	12-inch vinyl; CD; cassette	Public Demand; Relentless	
Australia	6 March 2000	CD	Public Demand; Relentless	
United States	16 May 2000	Rhythmic contemporary; contemporary hit radio	Republic; Universal	

== In popular culture ==
It is from this song that Leigh Francis's Channel 4 comedy series Bo' Selecta! took its name.
