= Artful Dodger (duo) =

English UK garage duo

- Origin: Southampton, England
- Genres: UK garage
- Years active: 1993–2001 [Mark Hill and Pete Devereux]; 2001 [Mark Hill]; 2001–2003 [Pete Devereux, DJ Dave Low and unknown]; 2003–present [MC Alistair and DJ Dave Low]
- Labels: Fagin; Centric; Public Demand; Blessed; Locked On; Relentless; FFRR; London; Warner
- Members: MC Alistair; DJ Dave Low
- Past members: Mark Hill; Pete Devereux

Original Dodger
- Years active: 2017–2018
- Label: Warner
- Members: Mark Hill; Pete Devereux

Artful Dodger were a UK garage duo initially featuring songwriters and producers Mark Hill and Pete Devereux. They achieved success in the 1990s and early 2000s, releasing seven consecutive UK top-20 singles. What began as a handle for the release of underground bootleg recordings became a musical project creating original material for mainstream release and culminated in the release of It's All About the Stragglers, after the duo went on to work with an array of up-and-coming vocalists. In 2001, Hill and Devereux parted ways due to creative differences and the trademark, name and usage rights of Artful Dodger were purchased by Blessed Records. Having reunited in 2017, Hill and Devereux found themselves unable to release new music or perform under their own name.

Hill and Devereux won numerous accolades, including the 2000 UK Producers of the Year and Ivor Novello recognition for their songwriting.

== History ==
=== Early history ===
==== Mark Hill ====
Mark Hill was admitted to the school of music at the University of Southampton as a percussionist while a teenager. Prior to Artful Dodger, he had performed with the Welsh Philharmonic Orchestra as a percussionist and played in jazz bands. He had also worked as a session musician.

During the second year of his three-year program at the University of Southampton, Hill joined a jazz-funk band. His small number of contact hours meant he had plenty of time on his hands, so he started a recording studio with Neil Kerr, a fellow student and bandmate from the band. Kerr's father provided seed capital, and the two business partners were able to secure a £20,000 bank loan for which Kerr's father was listed as guarantor. After a few years of trading, the business attracted further capital investment from 3MV. This studio was described by The Guardian as being a "soundproofed room next to a radio station in Southampton", a location which the article credits as having influenced the "commercial vibe" of their musical output.

==== Pete Devereux ====
Pete Devereux holds a Grade 8 in piano. Prior to Artful Dodger, he had played in grunge rock bands, performed classical violin, and DJ-ed. Devereux first found his way towards Hill when he booked time at his and Neil Kerr's studio, after discovering it in the Yellow Pages.

==== As Artful Dodger ====
The origins of Artful Dodger lie in an R&B remix crew of producers which included Mark Hill and Pete Devereux, known as Back to the Future. This group disbanded due to a lack of financial success. In 1997 Hill and Devereux joined forces to create bootleg editions of tracks including "Dreams" by Gabrielle, "You're Not Alone" by Olive, and "If You Love Me" by Brownstone, releasing these under the Artful Dodger moniker on Fagin Records.

Both Artful Dodger and Fagin were intended to be disposable aliases adopted to protect their identities and shield them from potential lawsuits from record companies which might be inclined to pursue them for unauthorised sampling of other artists' work. The name Artful Dodger was decided on over coffee at a meeting between Hill and Devereux in Southampton. Names such as Dick Turpin and Robin Hood were under consideration, but Artful Dodger held greater appeal due to its close association with the city of London, regarded by many as the capital of the garage sound.

Speaking of their use of 2-step rhythms, Hill said it emerged from his boredom with four to the floor structure of house music, while also being influenced by R&B, and the work of Ramsey & Fen, as well as Tina Moore's "Never Gonna Let You Go". He described the sound as one that 'wasn't trying to be house music, wasn't trying to be R&B...was just a...natural blend of the two'. Devereux commented he was excited by the emergence of the garage sound, saying he was particularly inspired by Double 99's "RipGroove", which had helped bring the sound to mainstream audiences.

==== Association with Craig David ====
Hill was introduced to Craig David when a friend was working on a project associated with a youth centre linked to Southampton Football Club, using Hill's and business associate Neil Kerr's studio. David was a soloist on the project, and Hill noted his talent. Hill next encountered David in a club 'years later'; finding he was already familiar with the bootleg vinyl releases he had completed with Devereux as Artful Dodger, and with Artful Dodger being in need of a vocalist to contribute to their original instrumental tracks, Hill invited David to return to his studio. This led to a series of vinyl releases via Artful Dodger's own label for the release of their original tracks, Centric Records, including "Something", "What Ya Gonna Do" and, most notably, "Re-Rewind". Following an initial 'white label' release, these were then licensed on to any interested record labels. The original plan was for David to be the frontman for Artful Dodger. Plans changed once David signed to a different record label and hired professional artist management: David was to use Artful Dodger to launch his solo career, thus leaving Hill and Devereux to become "unwitting pop stars" as the frontmen of Artful Dodger. At some stage in 2002, after David's departure, Andy Sherman sang with the outfit and toured with them.

In 2013 Devereux appeared alongside many other garage pioneers in a documentary exploring the legacy of UK garage, Rewind 4Ever: The History of UK Garage, talking about his career with Hill as Artful Dodger and working with David.

=== It's All About the Stragglers ===
On 20 November 2000 Artful Dodger released an album, It's All About the Stragglers, on FFRR Records. With tracks featuring mostly unknown vocalists, the album was largely a compilation of their previous vinyl releases and CD singles. FFRR had acquired the rights to a large number of Artful Dodger tracks that had previously been released via other labels. FFRR were therefore in the advantageous position of being able to present the duo with a fait accompli, whereby they did not genuinely have the choice to release the album under any other label.

=== Personnel changes, transfer of name and associated confusion ===
It was announced on 10 July 2001 that Pete Devereux was leaving Artful Dodger. The official statement emphasised that the parting of ways was 'amicable'. This news came immediately prior to the release of the single "TwentyFourSeven", featuring Melanie Blatt [different version to that which appears on It's All About the Stragglers]. Hill alone represented Artful Dodger in the cover art for the single and the video clip. Fatigued from an onerous tour schedule, having 'strained' relationships with certain colleagues, wanting to focus more on a behind-the-scenes music industry role as producer, and with a view towards doing more work with Craig David, Mark Hill left Artful Dodger, and Devereux returned, before leaving once again. It was in the midst of all of this that the Artful Dodger name was sold, or otherwise changed hands.

The transfer of the 'Artful Dodger' moniker has been the source of a great deal of speculation and critical commentary, expressed on social media sites including Facebook, Twitter and YouTube, and has been explained by Hill and Devereux variously across numerous interviews. The common theme articulated in these interviews is that the duo express their anger and frustration over the fact that two different people, only one of which had any, albeit limited and 'guest status' involvement in the creation of the Artful Dodger music, were seemingly able to achieve exclusive control over the Artful Dodger name, play at events, participate in interviews with journalists who were apparently unaware that the constitution of the group had changed, and most disconcertingly, appeared to take credit for the music that had made the original duo famous. That promoters would at times use photos of the original duo to advertise events featuring the new duo heightened the prevailing confusion. Whenever the opportunity presented itself in the natural course of the conversation however, DJ Dave Low has been known to pay homage to Mark Hill when being interviewed. In a 2011 interview with iFILM London, DJ Dave Low named Mark Hill as a current, but apparently dormant member of Artful Dodger. According to public records provided by the Intellectual Property Office - UK [IPO], there was no trademark of the terms 'The Artful Dodger' under the stipulated classes 9, 16, 25, 28, 41 prior to it being assigned to Mark Hill, as a consequence of a process initiated on 7 July 2001.

In a 2019 interview, Mark Hill described complex details regarding the transfer of the Artful Dodger name, consisting of the claim that as part of his departure from Artful Dodger, he had entered into a pact with Pete Devereux, part of which involved Devereux acquiring ownership of the Artful Dodger name; Public Demand subsequently acquired the name from Pete Devereux and have retained it to the present day. This version of events is somewhat substantiated by public records provided by the Intellectual Property Office - UK, which show that the 'Artful Dodger' name was transferred from Mark Hill to Pete Devereux on 27 January 2003. Pete Devereux transferred it to Public Demand Records on 1 May 2003. The trademark was transferred once again on 22 May 2008, from Public Demand Records to Blessed Records.

The Wayback Machine internet archive offers some evidence that Artful Dodger may have been a trio at some stage, with Pete Devereux appearing alongside DJ Dave Low and an unknown man on the main page of the group's website. It is unclear whether this had any practical significance that extended beyond the online marketing of the group. This representation of Artful Dodger as a trio is archived by the Wayback Machine as having been displayed from 25 October 2001 to 8 October 2010.

Once the Artful Dodger name came under the direct control of Public Demand Records, the duo which ultimately emerged and stands as the current incarnation of Artful Dodger has come to consist of MC Alistair, who had been a featured artist on tracks by the original Artful Dodger, and was now upgraded to the status of being a permanent member of the group; in addition to newcomer, DJ Dave Low. Both have toured the brand extensively and internationally over subsequent years as a DJ and MC duo; frequently being billed to appear alongside period genre peers including DJ Luck and MC Neat, and successors such as So Solid Crew. In addition to playing garage tracks, their repertoire has expanded to include tracks from the dubstep, deep funky house, soulful house, bassline, electro, jungle, drum and bass, and rare groove genres, curated to fit with the atmosphere at the event. Mark Hill has emphasised that he does not endorse this incarnation of Artful Dodger, and has communicated that he is sceptical of the inclusion of MC Alistair, dismissing it as an attempt by 'the label' to 'add legitimacy'.

=== Potential second album ===
In the immediate aftermath of the departure of Pete Devereux in July 2001, Billboard reported that it was anticipated that Mark Hill would complete a sophomore Artful Dodger album for release in the summer of 2002; this however never eventuated.

In a 2009 interview with TimeOut Dubai, DJ Dave Low mentioned that he was involved in the recording of a second Artful Dodger album. He stated that this upcoming album would cover an array of genres, including down-tempo, R&B, broken beat, funky house and bassline, in addition to garage. This alleged album has not been released to date, yet a track titled "One More Chance", featuring Mark Asare, surfaced on a Ministry of Sound compilation album around this time.

=== Original Dodger ===
In August 2016, a 'selfie' entered circulation on Facebook showing Mark Hill and Pete Devereux, fingers to their lips, with the hashtag #mumstheword. The pair were 'convening' for the purpose of thinking of solutions to problems stemming from the fact that they had lost control of the Artful Dodger name, including the issue that those who had established themselves in their stead were answering interview questions as though they were responsible for the creation of the Artful Dodger music, which was making it difficult for them to get bookings. As a consequence of the unexpected positive response to the possibility of a reunion of the original duo, in 2017, Mark Hill and Pete Devereux formally announced the reestablishment of their creative partnership, reuniting as Original Dodger. Leading the charge was the 2017 single, "Millionaire". News indicated that an '11 track release' was due to emerge, titled Soundtrack, and a tracklist was published. Soundtrack was to take the form of a 'mixtape', and was to serve as the precursor to an album release. Later in 2017, the single "Find Space", featuring Shakka, was released, which was followed in 2018 by a 4-track EP titled Momentum, led by the single "Bubblin", featuring Daniel Bedingfield. Disappointing sales of these early releases meant that a record deal with Warner Music Group was terminated in late 2018. Mark Hill indicated that as a consequence of this, any further Original Dodger material would be released independently.

== Discography ==
=== Albums ===
==== Studio albums ====
List of albums, with selected chart positions and certifications
Title	Album details	Peak chart positions		Certifications
Title	Album details	UK	AUS	Certifications
It's All About the Stragglers	Released: 20 November 2000; Label: London; Format: CD, digital download	18	53	BPI: Platinum

==== DJ mix albums ====
- Rewind: The Sound of UK Garage (March 2000)
- Re-Rewind Back by Public Demand (August 2000)
- Rewind 2001 – Lessons from the Underground (July 2001)

=== Singles ===
List of singles, with selected chart positions and certifications, showing year released and album name
Title	Year	Peak chart positions										Certifications	Album
Title	Year	UK	AUS	BEL (FL)	GER	IRE	NOR	NL	NZ	SCO	SWI	Certifications	Album
"The Revenge of Popeye"	1997	—	—	—	—	—	—	—	—	—	—		Non-album singles
"Something" (featuring Craig David)	1997	—	—	—	—	—	—	—	—	—	—		Non-album singles
"If You Love Me"	1998	—	—	—	—	—	—	—	—	—	—		Non-album singles
"The Messenger"	1998	—	—	—	—	—	—	—	—	—	—		Non-album singles
"What Ya Gonna Do" (featuring Craig David)	1998	—	—	—	—	—	—	—	—	—	—		It's All About the Stragglers
"Movin' Too Fast" (featuring Romina Johnson)	1999	—	—	—	—	—	—	—	—	—	—		It's All About the Stragglers
"Re-Rewind" (featuring Craig David)	1999	2	62	21	49	15	—	4	18	15	88	BPI: Platinum	It's All About the Stragglers
"Movin' Too Fast" (featuring Romina Johnson) (re-release)	2000	2	—	41	63	21	18	57	—	9	—	BPI: Gold	It's All About the Stragglers
"Woman Trouble" (featuring Robbie Craig and Craig David)	2000	6	68	60	95	31	—	63	43	19	98	BPI: Silver	It's All About the Stragglers
"Please Don't Turn Me On" (featuring Lifford)	2000	4	22	—	—	42	—	—	—	20	90	BPI: Silver	It's All About the Stragglers
"Think About Me" (featuring Michelle Escoffery)	2001	11	—	—	—	—	—	—	—	30	—		It's All About the Stragglers
"It Ain't Enough" (vs. Dreem Teem, featuring MZ May and MC Alistair)	2001	20	—	—	—	—	—	—	—	72	—		It's All About the Stragglers
"TwentyFourSeven" (featuring Melanie Blatt)	2001	6	—	66	—	41	—	—	—	16	—		It's All About the Stragglers
"Ladies" (featuring General Levy and Roachie)	2002	—	—	—	—	—	—	—	—	—	—		Non-album singles
"Midnight Lover" (featuring Sherman)	2002	—	—	—	—	—	—	—	—	—	—		Non-album singles
"Ruff Neck Sound" (featuring Richie Dan and Sevi G)	2003	—	—	—	—	—	—	—	—	—	—		Non-album singles
"Flex" (featuring Vula)	2006	—	—	—	—	—	—	—	—	—	—		Non-album singles
"One More Chance" (featuring Mark Asare)	2009	—	—	—	—	—	—	—	—	—	—		Ministry of Sound: Addicted to Bass 2009
"Laydeez [UKG Mix]" (featuring Roachie and General Levy)	2009	—	—	—	—	—	—	—	—	—	—		Ministry of Sound: Addicted to Bass Winter 2009
"—" denotes a recording that did not chart or was not released in that territory.

=== Production credits as Artful Dodger ===
- Killa Kela – "Takin' It Back"

=== Remixes ===
- Artful Dodger – "Please Don't Turn Me On"
- Barbara Tucker – "Stop Playing with My Mind"
- BBMak – "Still on Your Side"
- Brownstone – "If You Love Me"
- Colour Girl – "Joyrider"
- Craig David – "Fill Me In"
- Gabrielle – "Dreams"
- Gabrielle – "Rise"
- Jennifer Lopez – "Play"
- Lynden David Hall – "Forgive Me"
- Olive – "You're Not Alone"
- Romina Johnson – "Movin' Too Fast"
- Sisqo – "Thong Song"
- Sisqo – "Incomplete"
- Soulsearcher – "Do It to Me Again"
- Victor Romeo – "Love Will Find a Way"
