= DJ Spoony =

British DJ

DJ Spoony BEM
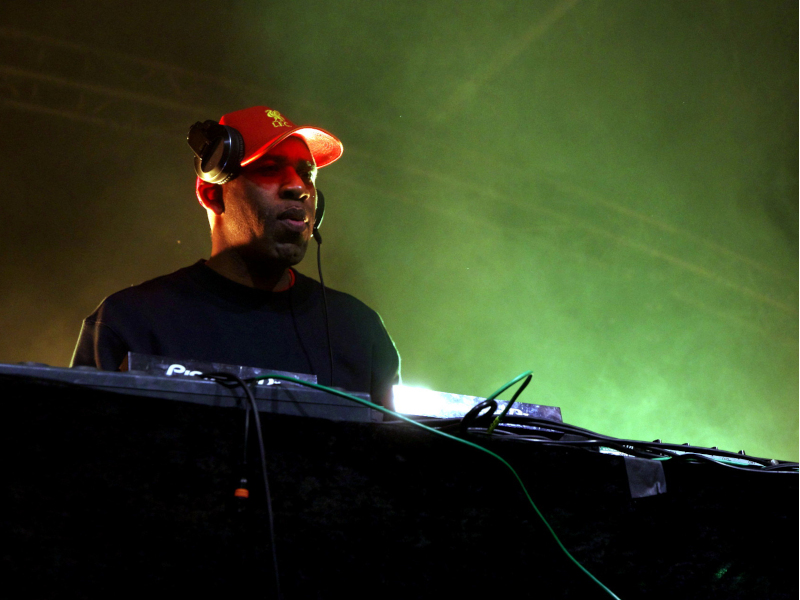
- Spoony DJing at the Lewes Music Festival, 2022
- Born: Johnathan St John Joseph; 25 June 1970 (age 56); Hackney, London, England
- Occupations: DJ; radio presenter; TV presenter
- Years active: 1996–present
- Website: djspoony.com

Johnathan St John Joseph BEM (born 25 June 1970), known professionally as DJ Spoony, is a British DJ and radio & television presenter. He is a member of the UK garage production trio, the Dreem Teem. Spoony also presents his BBC Radio 2 show The Good Groove.

== Early career ==
Joseph was born in Hackney, East London to British West Indian parents. As Spoony, his career started on London Underground (a leading pirate radio station in the mid-nineties), forming the trio the Dreem Teem with Mikee B (of Top Buzz) and Timmi Magic. With the Dreem Teem, he joined Kiss 100 in December 1997, followed by bringing UK garage nationally to BBC Radio 1 in January 2000. They went on to win a Sony Award in their first year.

== Solo radio work ==
He went on to host the Weekend Breakfast show on Radio 1 between October 2003 and September 2006. Listeners could join the Early Doors Club, play Judge Fudge, and become a Local Legend. Another long-running feature was Mills & Spoon (a nameplay on the Mills & Boon books), in which Scott Mills read out love stories every Sunday. On 31 July 2006, the BBC announced that Spoony was to leave Radio 1 after six years with the station to concentrate on Five Live work. His early breakfast slot was replaced by Fearne Cotton and Reggie Yates. He presented his final Radio 1 show on 17 September 2006.

He then commenced hosting 606 on Radio 5 Live as well as 'Spoony Meets...', a series of shows in which he interviewed various personalities from British football, including Alex Ferguson, Jose Mourinho and David Beckham.

He joined BBC Radio 2 with a new show in February 2019. On 25 October 2021, he stood in for Steve Wright for one day only. He has also deputised for Ken Bruce and Craig Charles on the station. On 22 July 2022, Spoony joined BBC Radio 2 permanently with The Good Groove broadcast every Friday from 9-11pm.

In January 2025, Spoony moved The Good Groove from Friday nights to weeknights (except Fridays) from 10pm to midnight, replacing Trevor Nelson's Rhythm Nation, who moved to the afternoon slot.

== Television and film ==
As well as appearing on various television shows, he also had a role in the 2012 British drama film Payback Season.

== Honours ==
Joseph was awarded the British Empire Medal (BEM) in the 2023 New Year Honours for services to charities through music during the COVID-19 pandemic.

== Personal life ==
Joseph is an ambassador for the Golf Roots Foundation and also organises an annual golf tournament at Stoke Park Club, Buckinghamshire. He lives in Bedfordshire.

== Discography ==
=== Studio albums ===
- Garage Classical (2019), Sony Music

=== Mixes/compilations ===
- Twice as Nice / Twice as Nice Ayia Napa (1999), React
- Twice as Nice pres. Essential Grooves (2003), Warner

=== Singles ===
- "Sweet like Chocolate" (featuring Lily Allen) (2019), Since 93
- "Flowers" (featuring Sugababes) (2019), Since 93 - UK Dance #26
