= DJ Luck & MC Neat =

British musical duo

- Origin: London, England
- Genre: 2-step garage
- Years active: DJ Luck: 1999–present MC Neat: 1999–present
- Members: Joel Samuels; Michael Rose

DJ Luck & MC Neat are a British musical duo, composed of Joel Samuels (a.k.a. DJ Luck) and Michael Rose (a.k.a. MC Neat) mainly performing a combination of house music and UK garage. They had three consecutive top 10 hits in the United Kingdom from 1999 to 2000.

== Career ==
They are primarily known for their 1999 single "A Little Bit of Luck", which started as a promotional dubplate, released at the price of £5. The track peaked at No. 9 in the United Kingdom in January 2000. In the same year they released a cover of "Master Blaster (Jammin)" by Stevie Wonder, retitled "Masterblaster 2000", which featured the vocals of JJ, who is on a number of Luck & Neat's songs. The track was their highest British chart entry, reaching No. 5 in June 2000. Their version of Ollie & Jerry's "Breakin'... There's No Stopping Us", retitled as "Ain't No Stoppin' Us", reached No. 8 in October that year. The duo also made an appearance on Top of the Pops, performing their UK No. 12 track "Piano Loco".

After the initial three chart hits they enjoyed, the majority of their work, along with their debut album, was produced along with, or by, the underground musician Shy Cookie, who was responsible for the shift in their music from being sample-based to using programmed (original) and live instruments, helping them to maintain underground credibility that in turn helped fuel their mainstream success.

By 2002, they were billed more simply as Luck & Neat.

== Discography ==
=== Albums ===
- A Little Bit of Luck (2001)
- It's All Good (2002) - UK #34
- Kiss Garage Presented by DJ Luck & MC Neat (2000)
- DJ Luck & MC Neat Presents... (2000)
- DJ Luck & MC Neat Present... II (2001)
- DJ Luck & MC Neat Present... III (2001)

=== Singles ===
Year	Single	Peak chart positions	Album
Year	Single	UK	Album
1999	"A Little Bit of Luck"	9	It's All Good
2000	"Masterblaster 2000" (featuring JJ)	5	It's All Good
2000	"Ain't No Stoppin' Us" (featuring JJ)	8	It's All Good
2001	"Piano Loco"	12	It's All Good
2001	"I'm All About You" (featuring Ari Gold)	18	It's All Good
2002	"Irie"	31	It's All Good
2006	"It's All About You"	—	Singles only
2008	"DJ Luck Just Don't Give a F***"	—	Singles only
2017	"Through the Night" (with Bugzy Malone)	92	King of the North
"—" denotes single that did not chart or was not released.
