= Romina Johnson =

British singer

Romina Johnson (born13th December1973) is a London-based R&B, soul and garage singer. She is perhaps best known in the UK for providing the lead vocals to the Artful Dodger song "Movin' Too Fast", a number 2 hit in early 2000.

== Life and career ==
Johnson was born in Rome to American musician Wesley Johnson and an Italian mother. Her singing debut was in 1994, for the Italian TV show Non è la RAI. Johnson is the featured vocalist on the 2000 hit single "Movin' Too Fast", with the Artful Dodger. Later that year, she appeared on the UK Singles Chart for the second time with "My Forbidden Lover", featuring Luci Martin and Norma Jean of Chic. On the 24 October 2011 broadcast of the BBC panel show Never Mind the Buzzcocks, Johnson appeared in the Identity Parade round. Since January 2013, she has been singing with the '70s and '80s disco outfit Odyssey.

== Discography ==
=== Albums ===
- Simply Passion (1998)
- Superbad (2001)
- Soul River (2008)
- Heartbeat (2020)

=== Singles ===
- 2000 – "Movin' Too Fast" - UK #2
- 2001 – "My Forbidden Lover" - UK #59
- 2003 – "Round & Round" (on Full Flava's album Colour of My Soul)
- 2005 – "What Can I Do"

=== Compilation appearances ===
- 1994 – Non è la Rai novanta5 (track "Il vento")
- 1995 – Non è la Rai gran finale (track "Tele telefonarti")
