= List of UK top-ten albums in 2001 =

The UK Albums Chart is one of many music charts compiled by the Official Charts Company that calculates the best-selling albums of the week in the United Kingdom. Before 2004, the chart was only based on the sales of physical albums. This list shows albums that peaked in the Top 10 of the UK Albums Chart during 2001, as well as albums which peaked in 2000 and 2002 but were in the top 10 in 2001. The entry date is when the album appeared in the top ten for the first time (week ending, as published by the Official Charts Company, which is six days after the chart is announced).

One-hundred and thirty-one albums were in the top ten this year. One album from 1999 and sixteen albums from 2000 remained in the top 10 for several weeks at the beginning of the year, while All Rise by Blue, Read My Lips by Sophie Ellis-Bextor and Songs in A Minor by Alicia Keys were all released in 2001 but did not reach their peak until 2002. Chocolate Starfish and the Hot Dog Flavored Water by Limp Bizkit, Onka's Big Moka by Toploader and White Ladder by David Gray were the albums from 2000 to reach their peak in 2001. Thirteen artists scored multiple entries in the top 10 in 2001. Alicia Keys, Destiny's Child, Gorillaz, Muse and Sophie Ellis-Bextor were among the many artists who achieved their first UK charting top 10 album in 2001.

The 2000 Christmas number-one album, 1 by The Beatles, remained at the top spot for the first two weeks of 2001. The Greatest Hits by Texas replaced it at number-one for a single week to add to its other week at number-one from October 2000. The first new number-one album of the year was Chocolate Starfish and the Hot Dog Flavored Water by Limp Bizkit. Overall, twenty-five different albums peaked at number-one in 2001, with twenty-five unique artists hitting that position.

== Background ==
=== Multiple entries ===
One-hundred and thirty-one albums charted in the top 10 in 2001, with one-hundred and fourteen albums reaching their peak this year (including, Songbird which charted previously but reached a peak on its latest chart run).

Thirteen artists scored multiple entries in the top 10 in 2001. Westlife had the most entries this year with three. Bee Gees, Bob Dylan, David Gray, Destiny's Child, Five, Gabrielle, Limp Bizkit, Madonna, Paul McCartney, Robbie Williams, Rod Stewart, and S Club 7 were the acts who had two top 10 albums this year. Bee Gees, Bob Dylan, Destiny's Child, Five and Rod Stewart's two entries were both released this year.

=== Chart debuts ===
Thirty-six artists achieved their first top 10 album in 2001 as a lead artist. Destiny's Child had one other entry in their breakthrough year.

The following table (collapsed on desktop site) does not include acts who had previously charted as part of a group and secured their first top 10 solo album, or featured appearances on compilations or other artists recordings.

| Artist | Number of top 10s | First entry | Chart position | Other entries |
|---|---|---|---|---|
| Destiny's Child | 2 | The Writing's on the Wall | 10 | Survivor (1) |
| Dido | 1 | No Angel | 1 | — |
| Jennifer Lopez | 1 | J.Lo | 2 | — |
| Anastacia | 1 | Not That Kind | 2 | — |
| Outkast | 1 | Stankonia | 10 | — |
| Eva Cassidy | 1 | Songbird | 1 | — |
| Wheatus | 1 | Wheatus | 7 | — |
| Papa Roach | 1 | Infest | 9 | — |
| Nelly Furtado | 1 | Whoa, Nelly! | 2 | — |
| Hear'Say | 1 | Popstars | 1 | — |
| Gorillaz | 1 | Gorillaz | 3 | — |
| The Avalanches | 1 | Since I Left You | 8 | — |
| Linkin Park | 1 | Hybrid Theory | 4 | — |
| Limp Bizkit | 1 | Significant Other | 10 | — |
| Shaggy | 1 | Hot Shot | 1 | — |
| Missy Elliott | 1 | Miss E… So Addictive | 10 | — |
| Blink-182 | 1 | Take Off Your Pants and Jacket | 4 | — |
| D12 | 1 | Devil's Night | 2 | — |
| Muse | 1 | Origin of Symmetry | 3 | — |
| Wyclef Jean | 1 | The Ecleftic: 2 Sides II a Book | 5 | — |
| Atomic Kitten | 1 | Right Now | 1 | — |
| O-Town | 1 | O-Town | 7 | — |
| Train | 1 | Drops of Jupiter | 8 | — |
| Staind | 1 | Break the Cycle | 1 | — |
| Slipknot | 1 | Iowa | 1 | — |
| The Strokes | 1 | Is This It | 1 | — |
| Sophie Ellis-Bextor | 1 | Read My Lips | 2 | — |
| Groove Armada | 1 | Goodbye Country (Hello Nightclub) | 5 | — |
| Samantha Mumba | 1 | Gotta Tell You | 9 | — |
| Bob the Builder | 1 | Bob the Builder: The Album | 4 | — |
| Starsailor | 1 | Love Is Here | 2 | — |
| Faith Hill | 1 | There You'll Be | 6 | — |
| Mis-Teeq | 1 | Lickin' on Both Sides | 3 | — |
| Alicia Keys | 1 | Songs in A Minor | 6 | — |
| So Solid Crew | 1 | They Don't Know | 6 | — |
| Blue | 1 | All Rise | 1 | — |

Notes

Emma Bunton's debut solo album, A Girl Like Me peaked at number four this year. As part of the Spice Girls she had recorded two chart topping albums to date (Spice and Spiceworld) and a third album, Forever, which reached number two. Her former bandmate Victoria Beckham also reached the top 10 for the first time as a solo artist with her self-titled collection. Wet Wet Wet frontman Marti Pellow scored a top 10 album with his debut solo, peaking at number 7 with Smile.

=== Soundtracks ===
The only film soundtrack album to reach the top 10 this year was Glitter by Mariah Carey, from the film of the same name.

=== Best-selling albums ===
Dido had the best-selling album of the year with No Angel. The album spent fifty-three weeks in the top 10 (including seven weeks at number one), sold over 1.92 million copies and was certified 7× platinum by the BPI. Swing When You're Winning by Robbie Williams came in second place. David Gray's White Ladder, Just Enough Education to Perform from Stereophonics and Dreams Can Come True, Greatest Hits Vol. 1 by Gabrielle made up the top five. Albums by Steps, Travis, Eva Cassidy, Destiny's Child and Kylie Minogue were also in the top ten best-selling albums of the year.

== Top-ten albums ==
Key

| Symbol | Meaning |
|---|---|
| ‡ | Album peaked in 1999 or 2000 but still in chart in 2001. |
| ♦ | Album released in 2001 but peaked in 2002. |
| (#) | Year-end top-ten album position and rank |
| Entered | The date that the album first appeared in the chart. |
| Peak | Highest position that the album reached in the UK Albums Chart. |

| Entered (week ending) | Weeks in top 10 | Single | Artist | Peak | Peak reached (week ending) | Weeks at peak |
Albums in 1999
| 13 November 1999 | 23 | Westlife ‡ | Westlife | 2 | 13 November 1999 | 1 |
Albums in 2000
| 5 February 2000 | 22 | Rise ‡ | Gabrielle | 1 | 19 February 2000 | 3 |
| 13 May 2000 | 7 | 2001 ‡ | Dr. Dre | 4 | 20 May 2000 | 1 |
| 3 June 2000 | 41 | The Marshall Mathers LP ‡ | Eminem | 1 | 1 July 2000 | 2 |
| 3 June 2000 | 14 | Onka's Big Moka | Toploader | 4 | 3 February 2001 | 3 |
| 24 June 2000 | 13 | 7 ‡ | S Club 7 | 1 | 24 June 2000 | 1 |
| 1 July 2000 | 40 | White Ladder (#3) | David Gray | 1 | 11 August 2001 | 2 |
| 22 July 2000 | 32 | Parachute ‡ | Coldplay | 1 | 22 July 2000 | 1 |
| 12 August 2000 | 10 | Ronan ‡ | Ronan Keating | 1 | 12 August 2000 | 2 |
| 26 August 2000 | 23 | Born to Do It ‡ | Craig David | 1 | 26 August 2000 | 2 |
| 9 September 2000 | 20 | Sing When You're Winning ‡ | Robbie Williams | 1 | 9 September 2000 | 3 |
| 30 September 2000 | 13 | Music ‡ | Madonna | 1 | 30 September 2000 | 2 |
| 28 October 2000 | 9 | Chocolate Starfish and the Hot Dog Flavored Water | Limp Bizkit | 1 | 3 February 2001 | 1 |
| 4 November 2000 | 18 | The Greatest Hits ‡ | Texas | 1 | 4 November 2000 | 2 |
| 11 November 2000 | 10 | All That You Can't Leave Behind ‡ | U2 | 1 | 11 November 2000 | 1 |
| 18 November 2000 | 10 | Coast to Coast ‡ | Westlife | 1 | 18 November 2000 | 1 |
| 25 November 2000 | 11 | 1 ‡ | The Beatles | 1 | 25 November 2000 | 9 |
Albums in 2001
| 6 January 2001 | 1 | The Writing's on the Wall | Destiny's Child | 10 | 6 January 2001 | 1 |
| 27 January 2001 | 53 | No Angel (#1) | Dido | 1 | 10 February 2001 | 7 |
| 3 February 2001 | 2 | J.Lo | Jennifer Lopez | 2 | 3 February 2001 | 1 |
| 3 February 2001 | 14 | Not That Kind | Anastacia | 2 | 17 February 2001 | 3 |
| 17 February 2001 | 1 | Stankonia | Outkast | 10 | 17 February 2001 | 1 |
| 24 February 2001 | 1 | Love Songs | Roy Orbison | 4 | 24 February 2001 | 1 |
| 24 February 2001 | 1 | Lost Songs 95–98 | David Gray | 7 | 24 February 2001 | 1 |
| 3 March 2001 | 12 | Songbird (#8) | Eva Cassidy | 1 | 24 March 2001 | 2 |
| 3 March 2001 | 2 | Wheatus | Wheatus | 7 | 3 March 2001 | 1 |
| 3 March 2001 | 1 | Infest | Papa Roach | 9 | 3 March 2001 | 1 |
| 10 March 2001 | 1 | Loco | Fun Lovin' Criminals | 5 | 10 March 2001 | 1 |
| 17 March 2001 | 1 | Reptile | Eric Clapton | 7 | 17 March 2001 | 1 |
| 24 March 2001 | 2 | Discovery | Daft Punk | 2 | 24 March 2001 | 1 |
| 24 March 2001 | 1 | Just Push Play | Aerosmith | 7 | 24 March 2001 | 1 |
| 24 March 2001 | 8 | Whoa, Nelly! | Nelly Furtado | 2 | 15 September 2001 | 1 |
| 24 March 2001 | 2 | Renaissance | Lionel Richie | 6 | 31 March 2001 | 1 |
| 31 March 2001 | 2 | Know Your Enemy | Manic Street Preachers | 2 | 31 March 2001 | 1 |
| 31 March 2001 | 8 | The Ultimate Collection | Billy Joel | 4 | 31 March 2001 | 1 |
| 7 April 2001 | 5 | Popstars | Hear'Say | 1 | 7 April 2001 | 2 |
| 7 April 2001 | 11 | Gorillaz | Gorillaz | 3 | 7 April 2001 | 2 |
| 7 April 2001 | 2 | Human | Rod Stewart | 9 | 7 April 2001 | 1 |
| 14 April 2001 | 2 | This Is Where I Came In | Bee Gees | 6 | 14 April 2001 | 1 |
| 14 April 2001 | 1 | I Need You | LeAnn Rimes | 7 | 14 April 2001 | 1 |
| 21 April 2001 | 22 | Just Enough Education to Perform (#4) | Stereophonics | 1 | 21 April 2001 | 5 |
| 21 April 2001 | 1 | Mechanical Wonder | Ocean Colour Scene | 7 | 21 April 2001 | 1 |
| 21 April 2001 | 1 | This Is the Moment | Donny Osmond | 10 | 21 April 2001 | 1 |
| 28 April 2001 | 1 | A Girl Like Me | Emma Bunton | 4 | 28 April 2001 | 1 |
| 28 April 2001 | 1 | Since I Left You | The Avalanches | 8 | 28 April 2001 | 1 |
| 28 April 2001 | 8 | Hybrid Theory | Linkin Park | 4 | 3 November 2001 | 1 |
| 28 April 2001 | 1 | Significant Other | Limp Bizkit | 10 | 28 April 2001 | 1 |
| 5 May 2001 | 2 | Free All Angels | Ash | 1 | 5 May 2001 | 1 |
| 5 May 2001 | 2 | All for You | Janet Jackson | 2 | 5 May 2001 | 1 |
| 5 May 2001 | 1 | Echo Park | Feeder | 5 | 5 May 2001 | 1 |
| 12 May 2001 | 16 | Survivor (#9) | Destiny's Child | 1 | 12 May 2001 | 4 |
| 12 May 2001 | 14 | Hot Shot | Shaggy | 1 | 9 June 2001 | 1 |
| 19 May 2001 | 7 | The Greatest Hits | Eddy Grant | 3 | 9 June 2001 | 2 |
| 19 May 2001 | 1 | Wingspan: Hits and History | Paul McCartney | 5 | 19 May 2001 | 1 |
| 26 May 2001 | 5 | Reveal | R.E.M. | 1 | 26 May 2001 | 2 |
| 26 May 2001 | 2 | One Wild Night Live 1985–2001 | Bon Jovi | 2 | 26 May 2001 | 1 |
| 26 May 2001 | 1 | Scream If You Wanna Go Faster | Geri Halliwell | 5 | 26 May 2001 | 1 |
| 26 May 2001 | 1 | Exciter | Depeche Mode | 9 | 26 May 2001 | 1 |
| 26 May 2001 | 1 | Miss E... So Addictive | Missy Elliott | 10 | 26 May 2001 | 1 |
| 2 June 2001 | 3 | One Love: The Very Best of Bob Marley & The Wailers | Bob Marley and the Wailers | 5 | 2 June 2001 | 1 |
| 2 June 2001 | 2 | The Essential Bob Dylan | Bob Dylan | 9 | 2 June 2001 | 2 |
| 9 June 2001 | 10 | The Very Best of the Eagles | Eagles | 3 | 23 June 2001 | 1 |
| 9 June 2001 | 1 | 10 000 Hz Legend | Air | 7 | 9 June 2001 | 1 |
| 16 June 2001 | 2 | Amnesiac | Radiohead | 1 | 16 June 2001 | 1 |
| 23 June 2001 | 15 | The Invisible Band (#7) | Travis | 1 | 23 June 2001 | 4 |
| 23 June 2001 | 1 | Take Off Your Pants and Jacket | Blink-182 | 4 | 23 June 2001 | 1 |
| 30 June 2001 | 7 | Devil's Night | D12 | 2 | 30 June 2001 | 2 |
| 30 June 2001 | 1 | Origin of Symmetry | Muse | 3 | 30 June 2001 | 1 |
| 30 June 2001 | 3 | Outrospective | Faithless | 4 | 30 June 2001 | 1 |
| 7 July 2001 | 1 | Rooty | Basement Jaxx | 5 | 7 July 2001 | 1 |
| 7 July 2001 | 2 | Smile | Marti Pellow | 7 | 7 July 2001 | 1 |
| 21 July 2001 | 5 | 8701 | Usher | 1 | 21 July 2001 | 1 |
| 4 August 2001 | 1 | Rings Around the World | Super Furry Animals | 3 | 4 August 2001 | 1 |
| 11 August 2001 | 5 | The Very Best of Prince | Prince | 2 | 11 August 2001 | 1 |
| 11 August 2001 | 3 | The Ecleftic: 2 Sides II a Book | Wyclef Jean | 5 | 18 August 2001 | 1 |
| 18 August 2001 | 4 | Right Now | Atomic Kitten | 1 | 18 August 2001 | 1 |
| 18 August 2001 | 1 | Paper Scissors Stone | Catatonia | 6 | 18 August 2001 | 1 |
| 18 August 2001 | 1 | O-Town | O-Town | 7 | 18 August 2001 | 1 |
| 25 August 2001 | 2 | Drops of Jupiter | Train | 8 | 25 August 2001 | 1 |
| 1 September 2001 | 5 | Break the Cycle | Staind | 1 | 1 September 2001 | 1 |
| 8 September 2001 | 2 | Iowa | Slipknot | 1 | 8 September 2001 | 1 |
| 8 September 2001 | 2 | Is This It | The Strokes | 2 | 8 September 2001 | 1 |
| 8 September 2001 | 2 | Kingsize | Five | 3 | 8 September 2001 | 1 |
| 8 September 2001 | 1 | Get Ready | New Order | 6 | 8 September 2001 | 1 |
| 8 September 2001 | 1 | Vespertine | Björk | 8 | 8 September 2001 | 1 |
| 15 September 2001 | 8 | A Funk Odyssey | Jamiroquai | 1 | 15 September 2001 | 2 |
| 15 September 2001 | 11 | Read My Lips ♦ | Sophie Ellis-Bextor | 2 | 29 June 2002 | 2 |
| 15 September 2001 | 1 | If You've Never Been | Embrace | 9 | 15 September 2001 | 1 |
| 22 September 2001 | 2 | Wonderland | The Charlatans | 2 | 22 September 2001 | 1 |
| 22 September 2001 | 1 | Love and Theft | Bob Dylan | 3 | 22 September 2001 | 1 |
| 22 September 2001 | 2 | Goodbye Country (Hello Nightclub) | Groove Armada | 5 | 22 September 2001 | 1 |
| 22 September 2001 | 1 | Changing Faces – The Best of Louise | Louise | 9 | 22 September 2001 | 1 |
| 22 September 2001 | 1 | Glitter | Mariah Carey | 10 | 22 September 2001 | 1 |
| 29 September 2001 | 2 | The Id | Macy Gray | 1 | 29 September 2001 | 1 |
| 29 September 2001 | 1 | Let It Come Down | Spiritualized | 3 | 29 September 2001 | 1 |
| 29 September 2001 | 2 | Gotta Tell You | Samantha Mumba | 9 | 6 October 2001 | 1 |
| 6 October 2001 | 3 | Collection | Tracy Chapman | 3 | 6 October 2001 | 1 |
| 13 October 2001 | 20 | Fever (#10) | Kylie Minogue | 1 | 13 October 2001 | 2 |
| 13 October 2001 | 4 | Songs from the West Coast | Elton John | 2 | 13 October 2001 | 1 |
| 13 October 2001 | 1 | Music of the Spheres | Ian Brown | 3 | 13 October 2001 | 1 |
| 13 October 2001 | 2 | Bob the Builder: The Album | Bob the Builder | 4 | 13 October 2001 | 1 |
| 13 October 2001 | 1 | Beautiful Garbage | Garbage | 6 | 13 October 2001 | 1 |
| 13 October 2001 | 2 | Then and Now | David Cassidy | 5 | 20 October 2001 | 1 |
| 13 October 2001 | 1 | Victoria Beckham | Victoria Beckham | 10 | 13 October 2001 | 1 |
| 20 October 2001 | 2 | Love Is Here | Starsailor | 2 | 20 October 2001 | 1 |
| 20 October 2001 | 3 | Days of Speed | Paul Weller | 3 | 20 October 2001 | 1 |
| 27 October 2001 | 11 | Gold: Greatest Hits (#6) | Steps | 1 | 27 October 2001 | 3 |
| 27 October 2001 | 3 | Cieli di Toscana | Andrea Bocelli | 3 | 27 October 2001 | 2 |
| 27 October 2001 | 3 | There You'll Be | Faith Hill | 6 | 27 October 2001 | 1 |
| 3 November 2001 | 1 | We Love Life | Pulp | 6 | 3 November 2001 | 1 |
| 10 November 2001 | 2 | Invincible | Michael Jackson | 1 | 10 November 2001 | 1 |
| 10 November 2001 | 2 | Lickin' on Both Sides | Mis-Teeq | 3 | 10 November 2001 | 1 |
| 10 November 2001 | 2 | The Hits – Chapter One | Backstreet Boys | 5 | 10 November 2001 | 1 |
| 10 November 2001 | 8 | Encore | Russell Watson | 6 | 10 November 2001 | 1 |
| 10 November 2001 | 8 | Songs in A Minor ♦ | Alicia Keys | 6 | 30 March 2002 | 1 |
| 17 November 2001 | 5 | Echoes: The Best of Pink Floyd | Pink Floyd | 2 | 17 November 2001 | 1 |
| 17 November 2001 | 1 | All This Time | Sting | 3 | 17 November 2001 | 1 |
| 17 November 2001 | 2 | Britney | Britney Spears | 4 | 17 November 2001 | 1 |
| 17 November 2001 | 1 | Best of The Corrs | The Corrs | 6 | 17 November 2001 | 1 |
| 24 November 2001 | 11 | World of Our Own | Westlife | 1 | 24 November 2001 | 1 |
| 24 November 2001 | 5 | Greatest Hits Volume 2 | Madonna | 2 | 24 November 2001 | 1 |
| 24 November 2001 | 9 | Dreams Can Come True, Greatest Hits Vol. 1 (#5) | Gabrielle | 2 | 15 December 2001 | 4 |
| 24 November 2001 | 6 | Their Greatest Hits: The Record | Bee Gees | 5 | 24 November 2001 | 1 |
| 24 November 2001 | 3 | The Story So Far: The Very Best of Rod Stewart | Rod Stewart | 7 | 24 November 2001 | 2 |
| 24 November 2001 | 1 | Solid Bronze – Great Hits | The Beautiful South | 10 | 24 November 2001 | 1 |
| 1 December 2001 | 13 | Swing When You're Winning (#2) | Robbie Williams | 1 | 1 December 2001 | 7 |
| 1 December 2001 | 1 | They Don't Know | So Solid Crew | 6 | 1 December 2001 | 1 |
| 1 December 2001 | 1 | Whatever Gets You Through the Day | Lighthouse Family | 7 | 1 December 2001 | 1 |
| 8 December 2001 | 14 | All Rise ♦ | Blue | 1 | 4 May 2002 | 1 |
| 8 December 2001 | 8 | Sunshine | S Club 7 | 3 | 8 December 2001 | 4 |
| 8 December 2001 | 1 | Greatest Hits | Five | 9 | 8 December 2001 | 1 |

== Entries by artist ==
The following table shows artists who achieved two or more top 10 entries in 2001, including albums that reached their peak in 2000. The figures only include main artists, with featured artists and appearances on compilation albums not counted individually for each artist. The total number of weeks an artist spent in the top ten in 2001 is also shown.

| Entries | Artist | Weeks | Albums |
|---|---|---|---|
| 3 | Westlife | 10 | Coast to Coast, Westlife, World of Our Own |
| 2 | Bee Gees | | |
| 2 | Bob Dylan | | |
| 2 | David Gray | | |
| 2 | Destiny's Child | | |
| 2 | Five | | |
| 2 | Gabrielle | 12 | Dreams Can Come True, Greatest Hits Vol. 1, Rise |
| 2 | Limp Bizkit | | |
| 2 | Madonna | | |
| 2 | Paul McCartney | | |
| 2 | Robbie Williams | 10 | Sing When You're Winning, Swing When You're Winning |
| 2 | Rod Stewart | | |
| 2 | S Club 7 | | |

== Notes ==
- Read My Lips reached its peak of number two on 29 June 2002 (week ending).
- Songs in A Minor reached its peak of number six on 30 March 2002 (week ending).
- All Rise reached its peak of number one on 4 May 2002 (week ending).
- Westlife re-entered the top 10 at number 3 on 20 January 2001 (week ending).
- Chocolate Starfish and the Hotdog re-entered the top 10 at number 8 on 20 January 2001 (week ending) for 7 weeks.
- Born to Do It re-entered the top 10 at number 10 on 27 January 2001 (week ending) and at number 8 on 10 March 2001 (week ending) for 2 weeks.
- Onka's Big Moka re-entered the top 10 at number 10 on 13 January 2001 (week ending) for 10 weeks.
- Not That Kind re-entered the top 10 at number 8 on 12 May 2001 (week ending) for 2 weeks and at number 10 on 9 June 2001 (week ending).
- All That You Can't Leave Behind re-entered the top 10 at number 7 on 10 February 2001 (week ending) for 7 weeks.
- 2001 re-entered the top 10 at number 8 on 10 February 2001 (week ending) for 2 weeks.
- Songbird originally peaked outside the top 10 at number 78 upon its initial release in 1999. It re-entered the top 10 at number 5 on 25 August 2001 (week ending) for 2 weeks.
- Wheatus re-entered the top 10 at number 10 on 21 July 2001 (week ending).
- White Ladder re-entered the top 10 at number 7 on 10 March 2001 (week ending) for 7 weeks and at number 8 on 21 July 2001 (week ending) for 12 weeks.
- All Rise re-entered the top 10 at number 7 on 30 March 2002 (week ending) for 2 weeks.
- Just Enough Education to Perform re-entered the top 10 at number 4 on 5 January 2002 (week ending) for 10 weeks.
- Sunshine re-entered the top 10 at number 8 on 2 March 2002 (week ending).
- World of Our Own re-entered the top 10 at number 7 on 23 February 2002 (week ending) for 4 weeks.
- No Angel re-entered the top 10 at number 7 on 5 January 2002 (week ending) for 6 weeks, at number 9 on 23 February 2002 (week ending) for 5 weeks and at number 8 on 6 July 2002 (week ending) for 2 weeks.
- Gold - The Greatest Hits re-entered the top 10 at number 8 on 5 January 2002 (week ending) for 2 weeks.
- Their Greatest Hits - The Record re-entered the top 10 at number 6 on 29 December 2001 (week ending) for 2 weeks.
- Read My Lips re-entered the top 10 at number 9 on 12 January 2002 (week ending) for 5 weeks and at number 2 on 29 June 2002 (week ending) for 5 weeks.
- Songs in A Minor re-entered the top 10 at number 10 on 19 January 2002 (week ending) for 2 weeks and at number 8 on 23 March 2002 (week ending) for 4 weeks.
- Whoa, Nelly! re-entered the top 10 at number 6 on 26 January 2002 (week ending).
- The Ultimate Collection re-entered the top 10 at number 9 on 19 May 2001 (week ending) and at number 8 on 23 June 2001 (week ending).
- The Greatest Hits re-entered the top 10 at number 10 on 31 March 2001 (week ending).
- Fever re-entered the top 10 at number 8 on 23 February 2002 (week ending) for 5 weeks, at number 10 on 6 April 2002 (week ending), at number 10 on 18 May 2002 (week ending) for 3 weeks and at number 9 on 22 June 2002 (week ending) for 4 weeks.
- A Funk Odyssey re-entered the top 10 at number 9 on 16 March 2002 (week ending) for 4 weeks.
- Britney re-entered the top 10 at number 10 on 27 April 2002 (week ending).
- Lickin' on Both Sides re-entered the top 10 at number 10 on 6 July 2002 (week ending).
- Figure includes album that peaked in 2000.
- Figure includes album that first charted in 2000 but peaked in 2001.

== See also ==
- 2001 in British music
- List of number-one albums from the 2000s (UK)
