= 2001 in British music charts =

This is a summary of 2001 in music in the United Kingdom, including the official charts from that year.

The year saw the tradition of UK acts dominating the top of the charts carried on from 2000. Songs were starting to spend 2–3 weeks at the summit improving on the large amounts of one week number ones from the previous year. CD sales also improved slightly with 3 million selling singles being issued this year. Overall, 30 songs topped the charts over the course of this year.

== Summary ==
The first new No. 1 of the year was from the first ever Portuguese act to top the UK charts; Rui Da Silva featuring Cassandra and their dance track, "Touch Me" spent 1-week at the summit. The year ended with the announcement that the pop group Steps were to split up on Boxing Day.

=== 21st century boy bands ===
Five scored their final chart topper with "Let's Dance", which marked their final single as a group. The follow-up No. 4 hit, "Closer to Me" was released after news of the band's split. They released a Greatest Hits compilation at the end of the year, which made number 9. BBMak were another boyband to split, however their career was very short-lived with 2001 seeing the start and end of it. Their debut single, "Back Here" failed to make the Top 20 upon initial release, however was then re-issued and peaked at #5. The follow-up single, "Still on Your Side" peaked at No. 8 and despite seeming to continue on with success, they disappeared after the release of their debut album Sooner or Later, which was a very slight Top 20 smash.

Blue were the most successful new boy band of 2001; whilst their debut single "All Rise" only made No. 4, other boy bands quickly fading away meant that it wasn't long before Blue could take centre stage. Their next two singles, "Too Close" (a cover of the 1998 U.S. chart topper from American boy band Next) and "If You Come Back", a slow love ballad, quickly became chart toppers for the group. However, once again, Westlife became the most successful boy band of the year. Although their run of consecutive No. 1 singles had been broken the previous year by Bob the Builder, they quickly returned to the top spot with the Comic Relief single of the year, "Uptown Girl" (a cover of the Billy Joel 1983 UK number 1) and "Queen of My Heart". By the end of the year, they had accumulated a total of 9 No. 1 singles on the UK chart, putting them side by side with the Spice Girls and ABBA. Their 3rd album, entitled World of Our Own, topped the UK albums chart for 1-week.

ABC aired a talent show, Making the Band, in which by the public vote, boyband O-Town were picked as winners. Their debut single, "Liquid Dreams" peaked at No. 3 in the UK and their follow-up, "All Or Nothing", stalled one place lower.

The Backstreet Boys released The Hits: Chapter One, which went platinum. The greatest hits album featured a new song, "Drowning", which got to number 4.

=== Girl groups ===
Girl groups were slowly changing away from 90s pop styles to a more R'N'B/Hip Hop direction. All Saints scored their final UK chart hit, with "All Hooked Up", a final release from their second album, peaking at #7. A greatest hits compilation, entitled All Hits followed, but it only made No. 18 on the albums chart.

Replacing Kerry Katona, Jenny Frost joined girl group Atomic Kitten, who became one of the main early 21st century pop girl groups. After the member change, the band's single "Whole Again", hit No. 1 for 4 weeks, becoming the longest stay since Westlife at New Year in 1999/2000 and also the 4th biggest selling single of the year. They scored a 2nd chart topper later in the year with a remake of The Bangles' "Eternal Flame" chart topper from 1989, which spent 2 weeks at the top and continued on to be one of the most successful groups of the decade.

Destiny's Child started the new trend for girl groups to veer away from pop, as their chart-topping third album, Survivor, spanned a 2nd consecutive No. 1 hit with the title track. The third single, "Emotion" peaked at #3. Mis-teeq, a girl group in a similar vein to Destiny's Child, scored great success throughout the year, with their No. 3 album Lickin' On Both Sides spanning 3 Top 10 hits; "Why", their No. 8 debut, "All I Want" (#2) & One Night Stand (#5). 3LW also made their debut on the UK charts with the No. 6 hit "No More (Baby I'ma Do Right)". Their follow-up single only made No. 21 and their eponymous debut album was not released in the UK.

=== Film and TV music ===
2001 was a moderately successful year for film and television music, providing some memorable hit singles and albums. The Tweenies and Bob The Builder both released singles, the former of which was a Christmas release making No. 9 and the latter having his 2nd No. 1 single with a re-make of the No. 1 from 1999 by Lou Bega, "Mambo No. 5". This 2nd No. 1 made Bob the first non-human who "sung" on his recordings to hit the top more than once.

Two very successful movies, Moulin Rouge! and Bridget Jones's Diary, had equally successful soundtracks and produced memorable hit singles each. On the Bridget Jones soundtrack, former Spice Girl Geri Halliwell had a chart-topping hit with a cover of The Weather Girls classic "It's Raining Men", while Gabrielle provided her vocals on the No. 4 hit "Out of Reach" which became her first Top 5 single since the chart-topping "Rise" in early 2000. The Moulin Rouge!collaboration proved to be slightly more successful with Christina Aguilera joining forces with Pink, Lil' Kim and Mýa on a cover of the 1975 hit single "Lady Marmalade" (itself previously covered in 1998 by All Saints. Their version proved to be even more successful, topping the charts worldwide and becoming the 900th single to top the UK charts.

Glitter became Mariah Carey's acting debut and the soundtrack became her 10th album release. Despite her massive worldwide success throughout the 90s, the new millennium did not take so kindly to her as both the movie and the soundtrack were a critical and commercial flop. Lead single "Loverboy" failed to make much of an impact, peaking at No. 12 in the UK (made No. 2 in the US, breaking her run of lead single chart toppers). The album peaked at No. 10 in the UK, another weak showing on Carey's behalf. Enough although the former of these singles failed to chart in the US and the latter was not released due to the weak performance of prior singles, "Never Too Far/Last Night a DJ Saved My Life" was able to crack the UK Top 40, peaking at #32.

2001 also saw the beginning of music talent programmes with the band Hear'Say being created on the T.V programme "Popstars" in the UK. It would go on to spawn the creation of similar formats including the British "Pop Idol", American version, "American Idol" and "The X Factor".

== Charts ==
=== Number-one singles ===
Chart date (week ending)	Song	Artist(s)	Sales
6 January	"Can We Fix It?"	Bob the Builder	90,300
13 January	"Touch Me"	Rui Da Silva featuring Cassandra	68,473
20 January	"Love Don't Cost a Thing"	Jennifer Lopez	67,879
27 January	"Rollin'"	Limp Bizkit	49,487
3 February	"Rollin'"	Limp Bizkit	47,435
10 February	"Whole Again"	Atomic Kitten	69,286
17 February	"Whole Again"	Atomic Kitten	85,295
24 February	"Whole Again"	Atomic Kitten	101,919
3 March	"Whole Again"	Atomic Kitten	113,090
10 March	"It Wasn't Me"	Shaggy featuring Ricardo "RikRok" Ducent	345,498
17 March	"Uptown Girl"	Westlife	292,319
24 March	"Pure and Simple"	Hear'Say	549,839
31 March	"Pure and Simple"	Hear'Say	242,000
7 April	"Pure and Simple"	Hear'Say	81,000
14 April	"What Took You So Long?"	Emma Bunton	76,317
21 April	"What Took You So Long?"	Emma Bunton	64,818
28 April	"Survivor"	Destiny's Child	104,062
5 May	"Don't Stop Movin'"	S Club 7	178,985
12 May	"It's Raining Men"	Geri Halliwell	154,811
19 May	"It's Raining Men"	Geri Halliwell	78,000
26 May	"Don't Stop Movin'"	S Club 7	63,500
2 June	"Do You Really Like It?"	DJ Pied Piper and the Masters of Ceremonies	148,594
9 June	"Angel"	Shaggy featuring Rayvon	178,645
16 June	"Angel"	Shaggy featuring Rayvon	101,000
23 June	"Angel"	Shaggy featuring Rayvon	76,000
30 June	"Lady Marmalade"	Christina Aguilera, Lil' Kim, Mýa and Pink	109,405
7 July	"The Way to Your Love"	Hear'Say	75,514
14 July	"Another Chance"	Roger Sanchez	72,534
21 July	"Eternity/The Road to Mandalay"	Robbie Williams	70,186
28 July	"Eternity/The Road to Mandalay"	Robbie Williams	64,000
4 August	"Eternal Flame"	Atomic Kitten	141,994
11 August	"Eternal Flame"	Atomic Kitten	70,000
18 August	"21 Seconds"	So Solid Crew	118,135
25 August	"Let's Dance"	Five	84,782
1 September	"Let's Dance"	Five	52,000
8 September	"Too Close"	Blue	83,886
15 September	"Mambo No. 5"	Bob the Builder	102,056
22 September	"Hey Baby"	DJ Ötzi	90,748
29 September	"Can't Get You Out of My Head"	Kylie Minogue	306,648
6 October	"Can't Get You Out of My Head"	Kylie Minogue	180,699
13 October	"Can't Get You Out of My Head"	Kylie Minogue	122,000
20 October	"Can't Get You Out of My Head"	Kylie Minogue	95,500
27 October	"Because I Got High"	Afroman	129,613
3 November	"Because I Got High"	Afroman	109,000
10 November	"Because I Got High"	Afroman	77,060
17 November	"Queen of My Heart"	Westlife	139,344
24 November	"If You Come Back"	Blue	87,600
1 December	"Have You Ever"	S Club 7	143,324
8 December	"Gotta Get Thru This"	Daniel Bedingfield	108,799
15 December	"Gotta Get Thru This"	Daniel Bedingfield	80,000
22 December	"Somethin' Stupid"	Robbie Williams and Nicole Kidman	98,506
29 December	"Somethin' Stupid"	Robbie Williams and Nicole Kidman	110,000

=== Number-one albums ===
Chart date (week ending)	Album	Artist(s)	Sales
6 January	1	The Beatles	88,739
13 January	1	The Beatles	43,000
20 January	1	The Beatles	31,000
27 January	The Greatest Hits	Texas	29,000
3 February	Chocolate Starfish and the Hot Dog Flavored Water	Limp Bizkit	40,000
10 February	No Angel	Dido	78,500
17 February	No Angel	Dido	79,000
24 February	No Angel	Dido	101,000
3 March	No Angel	Dido	84,000
10 March	No Angel	Dido	83,000
17 March	No Angel	Dido	64,000
24 March	Songbird	Eva Cassidy	78,000
31 March	Songbird	Eva Cassidy	120,000
7 April	Popstars	Hear'Say	306,631
14 April	Popstars	Hear'Say	127,000
21 April	Just Enough Education to Perform	Stereophonics	140,000
28 April	Just Enough Education to Perform	Stereophonics	51,000
5 May	Free All Angels	Ash	39,900
12 May	Survivor	Destiny's Child	118,000
19 May	Survivor	Destiny's Child	53,000
26 May	Reveal	R.E.M.	111,000
2 June	Reveal	R.E.M.	53,000
9 June	Hot Shot	Shaggy	54,500
16 June	Amnesiac	Radiohead	90,500
23 June	The Invisible Band	Travis	199,697
30 June	The Invisible Band	Travis	78,000
7 July	The Invisible Band	Travis	53,000
14 July	The Invisible Band	Travis	35,000
21 July	8701	Usher	42,500
28 July	Survivor	Destiny's Child	30,000
4 August	Survivor	Destiny's Child	31,500
11 August	White Ladder	David Gray	35,000
18 August	Right Now	Atomic Kitten	47,000
25 August	White Ladder	David Gray	180,000
1 September	Break the Cycle	Staind	39,000
8 September	Iowa	Slipknot	52,000
15 September	A Funk Odyssey	Jamiroquai	80,200
22 September	A Funk Odyssey	Jamiroquai	43,500
29 September	The Id	Macy Gray	36,000
6 October	No Angel	Dido	35,000
13 October	Fever	Kylie Minogue	139,000
20 October	Fever	Kylie Minogue	115,000
27 October	Gold	Steps	146,000
3 November	Gold	Steps	98,000
10 November	Invincible	Michael Jackson	110,000
17 November	Gold	Steps	55,000
24 November	World of Our Own	Westlife	178,000
1 December	Swing When You're Winning	Robbie Williams	295,024
8 December	Swing When You're Winning	Robbie Williams	194,000
15 December	Swing When You're Winning	Robbie Williams	212,000
22 December	Swing When You're Winning	Robbie Williams	245,000
29 December	Swing When You're Winning	Robbie Williams	365,208

=== Number-one compilation albums ===
Chart date (week ending)	Album
6 January	Now 47
13 January	Now 47
20 January	Clubbers Guide to 2001
27 January	Clubbers Guide to 2001
3 February	Breakdown – The Very Best of Euphoric Dance
10 February	Breakdown – The Very Best of Euphoric Dance
17 February	The Chillout Session
24 February	The Chillout Session
3 March	The Chillout Session
10 March	The Chillout Session
17 March	The Chillout Session
24 March	The Chillout Session
31 March	New Woman 2001
7 April	The Annual – Spring 2001
14 April	The Annual – Spring 2001
21 April	Now 48
28 April	Now 48
5 May	Now 48
12 May	Bridget Jones' Diary
19 May	Bridget Jones' Diary
26 May	Bridget Jones' Diary
2 June	Bridget Jones' Diary
9 June	Bridget Jones' Diary
16 June	Bridget Jones' Diary
23 June	Capital Gold – Legends
30 June	Capital Gold – Legends
7 July	Capital Gold – Legends
14 July	Capital Gold – Legends
21 July	Capital Gold – Legends
28 July	Capital Gold – Legends
4 August	Capital Gold – Legends
11 August	Now 49
18 August	Now 49
25 August	Now 49
1 September	Now 49
8 September	Now 49
15 September	Now 49
22 September	The Classic Chillout Album
29 September	Hits 50
6 October	Hits 50
13 October	The Classic Chillout Album
20 October	Pepsi Chart 2002
27 October	Pepsi Chart 2002
3 November	Now Dance 2002
10 November	Now Dance 2002
17 November	The Annual 2002
24 November	The Annual 2002
1 December	Now 50
8 December	Now 50
15 December	Now 50
22 December	Now 50
29 December	Now 50

== Year-end charts ==
=== Best-selling singles ===
Data based on sales from 31 December 2000 to 29 December 2001.

No.	Title	Artist	Peak position	Sales
1	"It Wasn't Me"	Shaggy featuring Rikrok	1	1,150,000
2	"Pure and Simple"	Hear'Say	1	1,070,000
3	"Can't Get You Out of My Head"	Kylie Minogue	1	989,000
4	"Whole Again"	Atomic Kitten	1	930,000
5	"Hey Baby (Uhh, Ahh)"	DJ Ötzi	1	
6	"Uptown Girl"	Westlife	1	
7	"Don't Stop Movin'"	S Club 7	1	
8	"Angel"	Shaggy featuring Rayvon	1	585,000
9	"Teenage Dirtbag"	Wheatus	2	
10	"Because I Got High"	Afroman	1	490,000
11	"Do You Really Like It?"	DJ Pied Piper and the Masters of Ceremonies	1	470,000
12	"Clint Eastwood"	Gorillaz	4	
13	"It's Raining Men"	Geri Halliwell	1	
14	"Lady Marmalade"	Christina Aguilera, Lil' Kim, Mýa and Pink	1	400,000
15	"Eternal Flame"	Atomic Kitten	1	379,000
16	"Gotta Get Thru This"	Daniel Bedingfield	1	370,000
17	"Mambo No. 5"	Bob the Builder	1	
18	"What Would You Do?"	City High	3	350,000
19	"21 Seconds"	So Solid Crew	1	
20	"The Road to Mandalay"	Robbie Williams	1	
21	"Have You Ever"	S Club 7	1	
22	"Castles in the Sky"	Ian Van Dahl	3	
23	"Queen of My Heart"	Westlife	1	
24	"Out of Reach"	Gabrielle	4	
25	"Touch Me"	Rui da Silva featuring Cassandra	1	290,000
26	"Perfect Gentleman"	Wyclef Jean	4	
27	"Rollin'"	Limp Bizkit	1	
28	"Follow Me"	Uncle Kracker	3	280,000
29	"Let's Dance"	Five	1	
30	"Somethin' Stupid"	Robbie Williams and Nicole Kidman	1	
31	"I'm Like a Bird"	Nelly Furtado	5	
32	"Smooth Criminal"	Alien Ant Farm	3	
33	"Heaven Is a Halfpipe"	OPM	4	270,000
34	"Starlight"	The Supermen Lovers featuring Mani Hoffman	2	260,000
35	"Survivor"	Destiny's Child	1	
36	"Purple Pills"	D12	2	
37	"Chain Reaction"/"One for Sorrow" (remix)	Steps	2	
38	"Butterfly"	Crazy Town	3	
39	"Always Come Back to Your Love"	Samantha Mumba	3	
40	"Another Chance"	Roger Sanchez	1	
41	"What Took You So Long?"	Emma Bunton	1	
42	"Everytime You Need Me"	Fragma featuring Maria Rubia	3	
43	"Ms. Jackson"	OutKast	2	
44	"All Rise"	Blue	4	
45	"Let Me Blow Ya Mind"	Eve featuring Gwen Stefani	4	
46	"Take Me Home"	Sophie Ellis-Bextor	2	
47	"Too Close"	Blue	1	
48	"Here with Me"	Dido	4	
49	"Dancing in the Moonlight"	Toploader	7	
50	"If You Come Back"	Blue	1	

=== Best-selling albums ===
Data based on sales from 31 December 2000 to 29 December 2001.

No.	Title	Artist	Peak position	Sales
1	No Angel	Dido	1	1,920,170
2	Swing When You're Winning	Robbie Williams	1	1,491,750
3	White Ladder	David Gray	1	1,058,490
4	Just Enough Education to Perform	Stereophonics	1	946,290
5	Dreams Can Come True, Greatest Hits Vol. 1	Gabrielle	2	945,820
6	Gold: Greatest Hits	Steps	1	934,220
7	The Invisible Band	Travis	1	933,610
8	Songbird	Eva Cassidy	1	872,880
9	Survivor	Destiny's Child	1	870,600
10	Fever	Kylie Minogue	1	832,790
11	Hot Shot	Shaggy	1	
12	World of Our Own	Westlife	1	
13	Hybrid Theory	Linkin Park	4	796,000
14	Popstars	Hear'Say	1	
15	Not That Kind	Anastacia	2	722,000
16	All Rise	Blue	2 (Note: Reached number 1 in 2002)	620,000
17	Sunshine	S Club 7	3	
18	Encore	Russell Watson	6	
19	Parachutes	Coldplay	2 (Note: Reached number 1 in 2000)	570,000
20	GHV2	Madonna	2	
21	Chocolate Starfish and the Hot Dog Flavored Water	Limp Bizkit	1	
22	Gorillaz	Gorillaz	3	530,000
23	All That You Can't Leave Behind	U2	3 (Note: Reached number 1 in 2000)	
24	Their Greatest Hits: The Record	Bee Gees	5	
25	Echoes: The Best of Pink Floyd	Pink Floyd	2	
26	Whoa, Nelly!	Nelly Furtado	2	450,000
27	The Story So Far: The Very Best of Rod Stewart	Rod Stewart	7	
28	A Funk Odyssey	Jamiroquai	1	
29	Onka's Big Moka	Toploader	4	420,000
30	J.Lo	Jennifer Lopez	2	
31	The Greatest Hits	Texas	1	
32	Sing When You're Winning	Robbie Williams	3 (Note: Reached number 1 in 2000)	
33	Solid Bronze – Great Hits	The Beautiful South	10	
34	Songs from the West Coast	Elton John	2	
35	1	The Beatles	1	
36	The Ultimate Collection	Billy Joel	4	
37	The Very Best of The Eagles	The Eagles	3	
38	Songs in A Minor	Alicia Keys	7	
39	Rise	Gabrielle	5 (Note: Reached number 1 in 2000)	
40	The Marshall Mathers LP	Eminem	2 (Note: Reached number 1 in 2000)	
41	Music	Madonna	5 (Note: Reached number 1 in 2000)	
42	Right Now	Atomic Kitten	1	
43	Best of The Corrs	The Corrs	6	
44	My Way: The Best of Frank Sinatra	Frank Sinatra	19 (Note: Reached number 7 in 1997)	
45	Born to Do It	Craig David	8 (Note: Reached number 1 in 2000)	
46	8701	Usher	1	
47	Reveal	R.E.M.	1	
48	Discovery	Daft Punk	2	
49	Small World Big Band	Jools Holland and His Rhythm & Blues Orchestra and Friends	8	
50	Cieli di Toscana	Andrea Bocelli	3	

=== Best-selling compilation albums ===
Data based on sales from 31 December 2000 to 29 December 2001.

No.	Title	Peak position	Sales
1	Now! 50	1	1,210,000
2	Bridget Jones's Diary Original Soundtrack	1	961,000
3	Now! 48	1	867,000
4	Now! 49	1	836,000
5	The Classical Chillout Album	1	
6	The Chillout Session	1	
7	Capital Gold Legends	1	
8	The Annual 2002	1	370,000
9	Chilled Ibiza	3	
10	Classical Chillout	4	364,000

== See also ==
- 2001 in British radio
- 2001 in British television
- 2001 in the United Kingdom
- List of British films of 2001
- List of UK Dance Singles Chart number ones of 2001
- List of UK Independent Singles Chart number ones of 2001
- List of UK Rock & Metal Singles Chart number ones of 2001
