= Dreams Can Come True, Greatest Hits Vol. 1 =

Compilation album by Gabrielle
- Released: 12 November 2001
- Recorded: 1993–2001
- Length: 63:01
- Labels: Go! Beat; PolyGram
- Producers: Richie Fermie; Jonathan Wales; Paul & Steve Jervier; Jon Douglas; McFarlane; The Boilerhouse Boys; Mike Rose; Nicholas Foster; Jonathan Shorten; Jonny Dollar; Simon Richmond; Julian Gallagher; Richard Stannard

Gabrielle chronology
| Rise (1999) | Dreams Can Come True, Greatest Hits Vol. 1 (2001) | Play to Win (2004) |

Singles from Dreams Can Come True, Greatest Hits Vol. 1
- 1. "Out of Reach" Released: 9 April 2001; 2. "Don't Need the Sun to Shine (To Make Me Smile)" Released: 22 October 2001

Dreams Can Come True, Greatest Hits Vol. 1 is a greatest hits album by English singer Gabrielle. It was released by Go! Beat Records on 12 November 2001 in the United Kingdom. Featuring all of her biggest hit singles from her first three albums Find Your Way (1993), Gabrielle (1996), and Rise (1999) as well as her 2001 hit single "Out of Reach" from the Bridget Jones's Diary soundtrack, Gabrielle also recorded two new songs for the compilation album, including the single "Don't Need the Sun to Shine (To Make Me Smile)" and the ballad "If I Walked Away," both co-written and produced by Jonathan Shorten.

The album received generally positive critical reception, with strong aggregated ratings, and was praised for its cohesive pop-soul selection and Gabrielle's distinctive vocals. Commercially, Dreams Can Come True, Greatest Hits Vol. 1 peaked at number 2 on the UK Albums Chart, topped the UK R&B Albums Chart, and was certified 4× Platinum with over 1.4 million UK sales. Internationally, it reached the top ten in several countries and earned multiple certifications, including Platinum in Denmark and Portugal, Gold in New Zealand, and 2× Platinum across Europe.

== Promotion ==
Apart from Gabrielle's previous singles, including her 2001 hit single "Out of Reach" from the Bridget Jones's Diary soundtrack, two further songs were recorded for and included on the album: "Don't Need the Sun to Shine (To Make Me Smile)" and the ballad "If I Walked Away." "Don't Need the Sun to Shine (To Make Me Smile)" was released on 22 October 2001 as the album's lead single. Written by Gabrielle and Jonathan Shorten, the song peaked at number 9 on the UK Singles Chart, becoming Gabrielle's tenth UK top-10 hit, and also reached the top 20 in markets including Denmark, New Zealand, and Portugal.

== Critical reception ==
Professional ratings
Review scores
| Source | Rating |
|---|---|
| AllMusic | 4.5/5 stars |
| The Guardian | 4/5 stars |
| laut.de | 5/5 stars |
| MTV Asia | 8/10 |

AllMusic editor Jose F. Promis rated the album four and a half out of five stars and called Dreams Can Come True: Greatest Hits, Vol. 1 a "fantastic collection of truly timeless, fad-free music" and a "completely accurate representation" of her career. Sheila Price from MTV Asia highlighted the song "Don't Need the Sun to Shine (To Make Me Smile)" as a standout release, describing it as upbeat and likely to become another hit, and described Gabrielle's sound as strongly rooted in Motown and R&B influences, praising tracks such as "Dreams," "Because of You," and "Give a Little More Time," while noting the emotional and stylistic strength of later material like "Rise" and "Out of Reach." John Aizlewood from The Guardian found that Dreams Can Come True, Greatest Hits Vol. 1 was showing how Gabrielle had "evolved into Britain's finest contemporary female soul singer."

laut.de critic Michael Frömmer gave the album a five-star review and viewed it as a justified greatest hits release after only three albums, praising Gabrielle's "beautiful songs between pop and soul," strong chart performance, and "astonishing voice." He called the new tracks "anything but flops" and the "icing on the cake," describing the set as "simply brilliant." Writing for BBC Music, Jacqueline Hodges referred to it as "the cream of Gabrielle's output," emphasizing her top 10 success, distinctive vocal tone, and consistent pop-soul appeal, and framed the release as a career-spanning "autobiography" and a definitive collection for fans. Hannah Hughes of The Telegraph & Argus found that Dreams Can Come True, Greatest Hits Vol. 1 was "probably the best chill-out album of the year," or "the best chill-down-your-spine album."

== Commercial performance ==
Dreams Can Come True: Greatest Hits Vol. 1 achieved strong commercial success across multiple markets. In the United Kingdom, it opened and peaked at number 2 on the UK Albums Chart only behind singer Robbie Williams' Swing When You're Winning (2001) and debuted at number 1 on the UK R&B Albums Chart. Spending nine weeks inside the top ten of the UK Albums Chart, it was certified Gold, Platinum and 2× Platinum by the British Phonographic Industry (BPI) in November 2001, before eventually reaching 4× Platinum status on 14 December 2001. With reported sales exceeding 1.4 million copies in the UK alone, it became the fifth-best-selling album of 2001 in the UK.

Internationally, Dreams Can Come True: Greatest Hits Vol. 1 reached the top 10 in several territories, including Ireland, Denmark, Portugal, and New Zealand, and charted within the top 20 in countries such as the Netherlands, Italy, and Sweden. In 2002, it was awarded Platinum by both IFPI Danmark and the Associação Fonográfica Portuguesa (AFP), while also reaching Gold in New Zealand. Across Europe, the compilation was certified 2× Platinum by International Federation of the Phonographic Industry (IFPI), indicating multi-million sales across the region.

== Track listing ==
Dreams Can Come True, Greatest Hits Vol. 1 track listing
| No. | Title | Writer(s) | Producer (s) | Length |
|---|---|---|---|---|
| 1. | "Dreams" | Gabrielle; Tim Laws | Richie Fermie | 3:46 |
| 2. | "Going Nowhere" | Gabrielle; George McFarlane | Jonathan Wales; Paul Jervier; Steve Jervier | 3:50 |
| 3. | "I Wish" | Gabrielle; Jon Douglas | Douglas | 4:49 |
| 4. | "Because of You" | Gabrielle; McFarlane; Raymond St. John | McFarlane | 3:49 |
| 5. | "Give Me a Little More Time" | Gabrielle; Ben Barson; Andy Dean; Ben Wolff | The Boilerhouse Boys | 4:56 |
| 6. | "Forget About the World" | Gabrielle; Barson; Dean; Wolff | The Boilerhouse Boys | 4:15 |
| 7. | "If You Ever" (with East 17) | Carl Martin | Mike Rose; Nicholas Foster | 4:15 |
| 8. | "If You Really Cared" | Gabrielle; Barson; Dean; Wolff | The Boilerhouse Boys | 4:52 |
| 9. | "Walk On By" | Burt Bacharach; Hal David | The Boilerhouse Boys | 3:20 |
| 10. | "Sunshine" | Gabrielle; Jonathan Shorten | Shorten; Fermie^{[a]} | 4:12 |
| 11. | "Rise" | Gabrielle; Ollie Dagois; Bob Dylan; Ferdy Unger-Hamilton | Jonny Dollar; Simon Richmond | 3:40 |
| 12. | "When a Woman" | Gabrielle; Julian Gallagher; Richard Stannard | Gallagher; Stannard | 3:12 |
| 13. | "Should I Stay" | Gabrielle; Jonathan Sharp | Dollar; Richmond | 3:56 |
| 14. | "Out of Reach" | Gabrielle; Shorten | Shorten | 3:18 |
| 15. | "Don't Need the Sun to Shine (To Make Me Smile)" | Gabrielle; Shorten | Shorten | 3:29 |
| 16. | "If I Walked Away" | Gabrielle; Shorten | Shorten | 3:22 |
| Total length: | | | | 63:01 |

Dreams Can Come True, The Remixes Vol. 1 track listing
| No. | Title | Length |
|---|---|---|
| 1. | "Dreams (The Developed Arrested Mix)" | 6:25 |
| 2. | "Going Nowhere (Law’s House Mix)" | 5:47 |
| 3. | "We Don’t Talk (Cleveland City House Mix)" | 7:10 |
| 4. | "Because of You (Man City Mix)" | 5:50 |
| 5. | "Give Me a Little More Time (Morales Club Mix)" | 7:50 |
| 6. | "Forget About the World (Daft Punk Mix)" | 6:47 |
| 7. | "Sunshine (Frankie Knuckles Classic Club Mix)" | 8:45 |
| 8. | "Rise (Deep Dish’s Hi-Rise Remix)" | 9:57 |
| 9. | "When a Woman (Bini & Martini Power Mix)" | 6:15 |
| 10. | "Should I Stay (Satoshi Tomiie Club Mix)" | 8:35 |
| 11. | "Out of Reach (Almighty Mix)" | 7:29 |
| 12. | "Don't Need the Sun to Shine (To Make Me Smile) (E-Smoove 7" Edit)" | 3:17 |

Notes

- "I Wish" and "Walk On By" are not included on some versions of the album.
- ^{^[a]} denotes co-producer(s)

== Charts ==
=== Weekly charts ===
Weekly chart performance for Dreams Can Come True, Greatest Hits Vol. 1
| Chart (2001-2002) | Peak position |
|---|---|
| Australian Albums (ARIA) | 97 |
| Australian Urban Albums (ARIA) | 17 |
| Austrian Albums (Ö3 Austria) | 59 |
| Danish Albums (Hitlisten) | 3 |
| Dutch Albums (Album Top 100) | 15 |
| European Albums (Music & Media) | 8 |
| German Albums (Offizielle Top 100) | 46 |
| Irish Albums (IRMA) | 3 |
| Italian Albums (FIMI) | 17 |
| New Zealand Albums (RMNZ) | 7 |
| Portuguese Albums (AFP) | 4 |
| Scottish Albums (Official Charts) | 2 |
| Swedish Albums (Sverigetopplistan) | 18 |
| Swiss Albums (Schweizer Hitparade) | 30 |
| UK Albums (Official Charts) | 2 |
| UK R&B Albums (Official Charts) | 1 |

=== Year-end charts ===
2001 year-end chart performance for Dreams Can Come True, Greatest Hits Vol. 1
| Chart (2001) | Position |
|---|---|
| Irish Albums (IRMA) | 10 |
| UK Albums (OCC) | 5 |

2002 year-end chart performance for Dreams Can Come True, Greatest Hits Vol. 1
| Chart (2002) | Position |
|---|---|
| European Albums (Music & Media) | 53 |
| UK Albums (OCC) | 76 |

== Certifications ==
Certifications and sales for Dreams Can Come True, Greatest Hits Vol. 1
| Region | Certification | Certified units/sales |
|---|---|---|
| Denmark (IFPI Danmark) | Platinum | 50,000^{^} |
| New Zealand (RMNZ) | Gold | 7,500^{^} |
| Portugal (AFP) | Platinum | 40,000^{^} |
| United Kingdom (BPI) | 4× Platinum | 1,434,476 |
Summaries
| Europe (IFPI) | 2× Platinum | 2,000,000^{*} |
^{*} Sales figures based on certification alone.^{^} Shipments figures based on certification alone.
