= List of UK top-ten albums in 2000 =

The UK Albums Chart is one of many music charts compiled by the Official Charts Company that calculates the best-selling albums of the week in the United Kingdom. Before 2004, the chart was only based on the sales of physical albums. This list shows albums that peaked in the Top 10 of the UK Albums Chart during 2000, as well as albums which peaked in 1999 and 2001 but were in the top 10 in 2000. The entry date is when the album appeared in the top ten for the first time (week ending, as published by the Official Charts Company, which is six days after the chart is announced).

Two albums from 1998 and eighteen albums from 1999 remained in the top 10 for several weeks at the beginning of the year, while Chocolate Starfish and the Hot Dog Flavored Water by Limp Bizkit, Onka's Big Moka by Toploader and White Ladder by David Gray were all released in 2000 but did not reach their peak until 2001. ...Baby One More Time by Britney Spears, Northern Star by Melanie C and Unplugged by The Corrs were the albums from 1999 to reach their peak in 2000. artists scored multiple entries in the top 10 in 2000. Coldplay and Craig David were among the many artists who achieved their first UK charting top 10 album in 2000.

The first new number-one album of the year was by Rise by Gabrielle. Overall, twenty-four different albums peaked at number one in 2000, with twenty-four unique artists hitting that position.

== Background ==
=== Best-selling albums ===
The Beatles had the best-selling album of the year with 1. Sing When You're Winning by Robbie Williams came in second place. Eminem's The Marshall Mathers LP, Coast to Coast from Westlife and Play by Moby made up the top five. Albums by Craig David, Texas, Coldplay, Whitney Houston and Madonna were also in the top ten best-selling albums of the year.

== Top-ten albums ==
Key

| Symbol | Meaning |
|---|---|
| ‡ | Album peaked in 1998 or 1999 but still in chart in 2000. |
| ♦ | Album released in 2000 but peaked in 2001. |
| (#) | Year-end top-ten album position and rank |
| Entered | The date that the album first appeared in the chart. |
| Peak | Highest position that the album reached in the UK Albums Chart. |

| Entered (week ending) | Weeks in top 10 | Single | Artist | Peak | Peak reached (week ending) | Weeks at peak |
Albums in 1998
| 31 October 1998 | 22 | You've Come a Long Way, Baby ‡ | Fatboy Slim | 1 | 23 January 1999 | 4 |
| 7 November 1998 | 31 | I've Been Expecting You ‡ | Robbie Williams | 1 | 7 November 1998 | 3 |
Albums in 1999
| 23 January 1999 | 18 | Forgiven, Not Forgotten ‡ | The Corrs | 2 | 10 April 1999 | 1 |
| 20 March 1999 | 29 | Performance and Cocktails ‡ | Stereophonics | 1 | 20 March 1999 | 1 |
| 20 March 1999 | 17 | ...Baby One More Time | Britney Spears | 2 | 5 February 2000 | 1 |
| 10 April 1999 | 29 | ABBA Gold: Greatest Hits ‡ | ABBA | 1 | 17 April 1999 | 5 |
| 5 June 1999 | 51 | Come On Over ‡ | Shania Twain | 1 | 11 September 1999 | 11 |
| 5 June 1999 | 48 | The Man Who ‡ | Travis | 1 | 28 August 1999 | 9 |
| 12 June 1999 | 20 | By Request ‡ | Boyzone | 1 | 12 June 1999 | 9 |
| 19 June 1999 | 2 | Schizophonic ‡ | Geri Halliwell | 4 | 19 June 1999 | 1 |
| 19 June 1999 | 4 | Californication ‡ | Red Hot Chili Peppers | 5 | 19 June 1999 | 1 |
| 9 October 1999 | 25 | Reload ‡ | Tom Jones | 1 | 9 October 1999 | 3 |
| 16 October 1999 | 11 | S Club ‡ | S Club 7 | 2 | 16 October 1999 | 1 |
| 16 October 1999 | 27 | On How Life Is ‡ | Macy Gray | 3 | 6 November 1999 | 3 |
| 30 October 1999 | 8 | Northern Star | Melanie C | 4 | 2 September 2000 | 1 |
| 6 November 1999 | 11 | Steptacular ‡ | Steps | 1 | 6 November 1999 | 4 |
| 13 November 1999 | 23 | Westlife ‡ | Westlife | 2 | 13 November 1999 | 1 |
| 27 November 1999 | 10 | All the Way... A Decade of Song ‡ | Celine Dion | 1 | 27 November 1999 | 1 |
| 27 November 1999 | 2 | The Corrs Unplugged | The Corrs | 7 | 1 January 2000 | 1 |
| 18 December 1999 | 3 | Songs from the Last Century ‡ | George Michael | 2 | 18 December 1999 | 1 |
Albums in 2000
| 29 January 2000 | 4 | Pieces in a Modern Style | William Orbit | 2 | 29 January 2000 | 1 |
| 29 January 2000 | 2 | The Screen Behind the Mirror | Enigma | 7 | 29 January 2000 | 1 |
| 5 February 2000 | 22 | Rise | Gabrielle | 1 | 19 February 2000 | 3 |
| 5 February 2000 | 3 | Tales from New York: The Very Best of Simon & Garfunkel | Simon & Garfunkel | 8 | 12 February 2000 | 1 |
| 12 February 2000 | 2 | XTRMNTR | Primal Scream | 3 | 12 February 2000 | 1 |
| 19 February 2000 | 3 | The Collection | Barry White | 6 | 19 February 2000 | 2 |
| 19 February 2000 | 2 | Marvin Gaye: The Love Songs | Marvin Gaye | 8 | 19 February 2000 | 2 |
| 26 February 2000 | 2 | Word Gets Around | Stereophonics | 9 | 26 February 2000 | 2 |
| 4 March 2000 | 17 | Supernatural | Santana | 1 | 1 April 2000 | 2 |
| 4 March 2000 | 30 | Play (#5) | Moby | 1 | 15 April 2000 | 5 |
| 11 March 2000 | 3 | Standing on the Shoulder of Giants | Oasis | 1 | 11 March 2000 | 1 |
| 11 March 2000 | 1 | Machina/The Machines of God | The Smashing Pumpkins | 7 | 11 March 2000 | 1 |
| 11 March 2000 | 1 | Daisies of the Galaxy | Eels | 8 | 11 March 2000 | 1 |
| 18 March 2000 | 6 | The Woman in Me | Shania Twain | 7 | 1 April 2000 | 1 |
| 25 March 2000 | 1 | The Platinum Album | Vengaboys | 9 | 25 March 2000 | 1 |
| 8 April 2000 | 1 | Drawn from Memory | Embrace | 8 | 8 April 2000 | 1 |
| 8 April 2000 | 1 | Behind the Sun | Chicane | 10 | 8 April 2000 | 1 |
| 15 April 2000 | 7 | Engelbert At His Very Best | Engelbert Humperdinck | 5 | 20 May 2000 | 1 |
| 22 April 2000 | 2 | Heliocentric | Paul Weller | 2 | 22 April 2000 | 1 |
| 22 April 2000 | 4 | Things to Make and Do | Moloko | 3 | 22 April 2000 | 1 |
| 6 May 2000 | 3 | The Heat | Toni Braxton | 3 | 6 May 2000 | 1 |
| 6 May 2000 | 1 | Skull & Bones | Cypress Hill | 6 | 6 May 2000 | 1 |
| 6 May 2000 | 1 | Silver & Gold | Neil Young | 10 | 6 May 2000 | 1 |
| 13 May 2000 | 7 | 2001 | Dr. Dre | 4 | 20 May 2000 | 1 |
| 20 May 2000 | 1 | Mystery White Boy: Live '95–'96 | Jeff Buckley | 8 | 20 May 2000 | 1 |
| 27 May 2000 | 17 | Whitney: The Greatest Hits (#9) | Whitney Houston | 1 | 27 May 2000 | 2 |
| 27 May 2000 | 8 | Oops!... I Did It Again | Britney Spears | 2 | 27 May 2000 | 1 |
| 27 May 2000 | 1 | Binaural | Pearl Jam | 5 | 27 May 2000 | 1 |
| 27 May 2000 | 2 | Greatest Hits: Shining Like a National Guitar | Paul Simon | 6 | 27 May 2000 | 1 |
| 27 May 2000 | 1 | Science & Nature | The Bluetones | 7 | 27 May 2000 | 1 |
| 3 June 2000 | 41 | The Marshall Mathers LP (#3) | Eminem | 1 | 1 July 2000 | 2 |
| 3 June 2000 | 14 | Onka's Big Moka ♦ | Toploader | 4 | 3 February 2001 | 3 |
| 10 June 2000 | 4 | Crush | Bon Jovi | 1 | 10 June 2000 | 1 |
| 10 June 2000 | 1 | Brave New World | Iron Maiden | 7 | 10 June 2000 | 1 |
| 10 June 2000 | 1 | Greatest Hits | Simply Red | 10 | 10 June 2000 | 1 |
| 17 June 2000 | 2 | Inspiration | Jane McDonald | 6 | 17 June 2000 | 1 |
| 17 June 2000 | 1 | Fold Your Hands Child, You Walk Like a Peasant | Belle & Sebastian | 10 | 17 June 2000 | 1 |
| 24 June 2000 | 13 | 7 | S Club 7 | 1 | 24 June 2000 | 1 |
| 24 June 2000 | 1 | Classic Sinatra: His Greatest Performances 1953–1960 | Frank Sinatra | 10 | 24 June 2000 | 1 |
| 1 July 2000 | 40 | White Ladder ♦ | David Gray | 1 | 11 August 2001 | 2 |
| 1 July 2000 | 1 | New Beginning | Stephen Gately | 9 | 1 July 2000 | 1 |
| 8 July 2000 | 3 | Alone with Everybody | Richard Ashcroft | 1 | 8 July 2000 | 1 |
| 22 July 2000 | 32 | Parachutes (#8) | Coldplay | 1 | 22 July 2000 | 1 |
| 22 July 2000 | 3 | Fragments of Freedom | Morcheeba | 6 | 22 July 2000 | 1 |
| 29 July 2000 | 9 | In Blue | The Corrs | 1 | 29 July 2000 | 2 |
| 29 July 2000 | 1 | Who Needs Guitars Anyway? | Alice Deejay | 8 | 29 July 2000 | 1 |
| 5 August 2000 | 1 | The Slim Shady LP | Eminem | 10 | 5 August 2000 | 1 |
| 12 August 2000 | 10 | Ronan | Ronan Keating | 1 | 12 August 2000 | 2 |
| 12 August 2000 | 5 | Affirmation | Savage Garden | 7 | 19 August 2000 | 2 |
| 26 August 2000 | 23 | Born to Do It (#6) | Craig David | 1 | 26 August 2000 | 2 |
| 9 September 2000 | 20 | Sing When You're Winning (#2) | Robbie Williams | 1 | 9 September 2000 | 3 |
| 16 September 2000 | 3 | Gold: The Best of Spandau Ballet | Spandau Ballet | 7 | 23 September 2000 | 2 |
| 23 September 2000 | 1 | The Best of The Doors | The Doors | 9 | 23 September 2000 | 1 |
| 23 September 2000 | 1 | Experience Hendrix: The Best of Jimi Hendrix | Jimi Hendrix | 10 | 23 September 2000 | 1 |
| 30 September 2000 | 13 | Music (#10) | Madonna | 1 | 30 September 2000 | 2 |
| 30 September 2000 | 1 | Hear My Cry | Sonique | 6 | 30 September 2000 | 1 |
| 30 September 2000 | 1 | The Immaculate Collection | Madonna | 8 | 30 September 2000 | 1 |
| 7 October 2000 | 2 | Light Years | Kylie Minogue | 2 | 7 October 2000 | 1 |
| 7 October 2000 | 2 | Sailing to Philadelphia | Mark Knopfler | 4 | 7 October 2000 | 1 |
| 7 October 2000 | 1 | Bowie at the Beeb | David Bowie | 7 | 7 October 2000 | 1 |
| 7 October 2000 | 1 | Abandoned Shopping Trolley Hotline | Gomez | 10 | 7 October 2000 | 1 |
| 14 October 2000 | 2 | Kid A | Radiohead | 1 | 14 October 2000 | 2 |
| 14 October 2000 | 1 | Warning | Green Day | 4 | 14 October 2000 | 1 |
| 14 October 2000 | 3 | The Voice | Russell Watson | 5 | 21 October 2000 | 1 |
| 21 October 2000 | 1 | Painting It Red | The Beautiful South | 2 | 21 October 2000 | 1 |
| 21 October 2000 | 1 | Black Market Music | Placebo | 6 | 21 October 2000 | 1 |
| 21 October 2000 | 2 | The Whole Story: His Greatest Hits | Cliff Richard | 6 | 28 October 2000 | 1 |
| 28 October 2000 | 3 | Saints & Sinners | All Saints | 1 | 28 October 2000 | 1 |
| 28 October 2000 | 9 | Chocolate Starfish and the Hot Dog Flavored Water ♦ | Limp Bizkit | 1 | 3 February 2001 | 1 |
| 28 October 2000 | 1 | Faith & Inspiration | Daniel O'Donnell | 4 | 28 October 2000 | 1 |
| 4 November 2000 | 18 | The Greatest Hits (#7) | Texas | 1 | 4 November 2000 | 2 |
| 4 November 2000 | 1 | The Very Best of UB40 1980–2000 | UB40 | 7 | 4 November 2000 | 1 |
| 11 November 2000 | 10 | All That You Can't Leave Behind | U2 | 1 | 11 November 2000 | 1 |
| 11 November 2000 | 2 | Blur: The Best Of | Blur | 3 | 11 November 2000 | 1 |
| 11 November 2000 | 4 | Buzz | Steps | 4 | 11 November 2000 | 2 |
| 18 November 2000 | 10 | Coast to Coast (#4) | Westlife | 1 | 18 November 2000 | 1 |
| 18 November 2000 | 1 | Forever | Spice Girls | 2 | 18 November 2000 | 1 |
| 18 November 2000 | 1 | Halfway Between the Gutter and the Stars | Fatboy Slim | 8 | 18 November 2000 | 1 |
| 25 November 2000 | 11 | 1 (#1) | The Beatles | 1 | 25 November 2000 | 9 |
| 25 November 2000 | 1 | Familiar to Millions | Oasis | 5 | 25 November 2000 | 1 |
| 25 November 2000 | 1 | Elton John One Night Only – The Greatest Hits | Elton John | 7 | 25 November 2000 | 1 |
| 9 December 2000 | 2 | A Day Without Rain | Enya | 6 | 9 December 2000 | 1 |
| 9 December 2000 | 4 | The 50 Greatest Hits | Elvis Presley | 8 | 9 December 2000 | 1 |

== Entries by artist ==
The following table shows artists who achieved two or more top 10 entries in 2000, including albums that reached their peak in 1999. The figures only include main artists, with featured artists and appearances on compilation albums not counted individually for each artist. The total number of weeks an artist spent in the top ten in 2000 is also shown.

| Entries | Artist | Weeks | Albums |
|---|---|---|---|
| 3 | The Corrs | 11 | Forgiven, Not Forgotten, In Blue, Unplugged |
| 2 | Eminem | 31 | The Marshall Mathers LP, The Slim Shady LP |
| 2 | Madonna | 11 | Music, The Immaculate Collection |
| 2 | Oasis | 4 | Familiar to Millions, Standing on the Shoulder of Giants |
| 2 | Paul Simon | 5 | Greatest Hits: Shining Like a National Guitar, Tales from New York: The Very Best of Simon & Garfunkel |
| 2 | Westlife | 22 | Coast to Coast, Westlife |

== See also ==
- 2000 in British music
- List of number-one albums from the 2000s (UK)
