= Moonlight Over Memphis =

Studio album by Marti Pellow
- Released: 2 October 2006 (UK)
- Recorded: 2005–2006
- Studios: Royal Studios, Memphis
- Genres: Southern soul; Memphis soul
- Label: DMG TV
- Producers: Willie Mitchell; Marti Pellow

Marti Pellow chronology
Between the Covers (2003)	Moonlight Over Memphis (2006)	Sentimental Me (2008)

Singles from Moonlight Over Memphis
- 1. "Come Back Home" Released: September 2006

Moonlight Over Memphis is the third studio album by Wet Wet Wet frontman Marti Pellow. Released on October 2, 2006, the album spawned the single "Come Back Home", and was produced by soul producer Willie Mitchell.

== Recording ==
Recorded at his own expense, the album saw Pellow re-unite with frequent collaborators Willie Mitchell and Chris Difford, with whom he had written the entirety of his debut album, Smile. Pellow said of the album, "As a listener, you need to commit to this record. You'll get out what you are prepared to put into it. For me, this is as good as it gets."

The album sees Pellow return to his soul roots, drawing comparisons to the Wets' 1988 release The Memphis Sessions, which was also produced by Mitchell. Mitchell worked on the album despite suffering from serious diabetes at the time. Pellow felt that Tennessee, where the album was recorded, had become a second home for him. He had been awarded the Freedom of Memphis in 2001 and 9 May is celebrated as Marti Pellow Day in Tennessee.

Although the album was completed in 2006, Pellow and Mitchell began work on it in 2000, prior to the release of Pellow's first two albums and his 2004 reunion with Wet Wet Wet; the reasons for the album's delayed release are unclear. Mitchell helped Pellow arrange a "dream team" of musicians similar in age to Mitchell to play on the album, including players who appeared on classic albums by Al Green and Sam Cooke. These veteran session musicians include bassist Leroy Hodges, drummer Steve Potts and keyboardist Lester Snell. As one journalist describes, the album paired Pellow and the "legendary soul producer" Mitchell with "veteran musicians from the Motown era." As Pellow explains, by using the original musicians "who played that trumpet or played that guitar on the Aretha Franklin album", the album departs from albums by other musicians who seek merely to emulate the music of another era with unrelated personnel.

According to Pellow, the album was produced in an old-fashioned manner, with analogue equipment instead of digital equipment. "We used manuscript paper and a lot of cigarettes," he said, "and ate too much fried chicken." To keep the essence of the recording, Pellow insisted on cutting the album live, recording only three or four vocal takes for the songs. "I wasn't thinking about what's going to be on Radio 2," he said, "I did out out of sheer love of the music. There's a real gravitas and integrity that has to be respected."

Manchester Evening News describes the album as blues-tinged and "in many ways a case of revisiting old inspirations." The Argus says the record "demonstrates a deep affinity with Southern soul." Among the record's songs, "Our Love" is reminiscent of Cole Porter, while "Let the Sun Walk You Home" is inspired by Simon and Garfunkel.

== Promotion ==
"Come Back Home" was released as the lead and only single from the album, being promoted with a performance on Loose Women shortly before the album's release.

"Let the Sun Walk You Home" has since become the most recognisable track from the album, becoming a regular staple of Marti's live sets, being performed on every tour, up to and including his most recent Greatest Hits Tour, which ran from Sept 2021 until May 2022.

== Chart performance ==
Moonlight Over Memphis debuted at number 15 on the Scottish Albums Chart and at number 27 on the UK Albums Chart. It additionally debuted at number 3 on the UK Independent Albums Chart, spending 11 weeks on that chart.

== Critical reception ==
Professional ratings
Review scores
Source	Rating
The Press	4/5 stars
Mojo	3/5 stars

In her review of Moonlight Over Memphis, Maxine Gordon of The Press wrote that Pellow "sounds like a Memphis heavyweight on this collection of very fine songs", praising the "first class" songwriting and rich, sophisticated production. Gordon added that the album would change the views of those who believed Pellow was "a washout" after leaving Wet Wet Wet, adding that his voice had become less sweet and more soulful and sexy. South Wales Argus journalist Danuel Lombard said that, whereas Robbie Williams' Swing When You're Winning (2001) mimicked the sound of celebrated records, "Moonlight Over Memphis is in a league of its own for authenticity". The Dorset Echo believed the album "sees Marti on his best form yet."

A reviewer for Mojo deemed it to be "undeniably Pellow's best solo release yet", finding his voice better than ever and observing that, aided by veteran session musicians, "Mitchell impeccably recreates the smooth, smoky Memphis feel." However, the reviewer felt that only half of the songs – mostly co-written with Difford – are worth "such exquisite settings", praising songs like "Still Standing" for being affecting but dismissing several other songs as maudlin or overlong and clichéd, "compromising the album's overall integrity." Telegraph & Argus reviewer Mary Cuthbert did not enjoy the "slow ballads and crooning" that makes up the album, but believed Wet Wet Wet fans would probably love the album, "as will anybody who enjoys a good soulful ballad."

== Track listing ==
No.	Title	Writer(s)	Producer(s)	Length
1.	"Still Standing"	Marti Pellow; Willie Mitchell; Thomas Bingham	Pellow; Mitchell	4:39
2.	"Can't Stop Loving You"	Pellow; James Hallawell	Pellow; Mitchell	5:00
3.	"It's All About"	Pellow; Chris Difford; Lester Snell	Pellow; Mitchell	5:04
4.	"Our Love"	Pellow; Difford; Snell	Pellow; Mitchell	4:32
5.	"Mend This Heart of Mine/And I Feel"	Pellow; Hallawell	Pellow; Mitchell	4:31
6.	"Let the Sun Walk You Home"	Pellow; Hallawell	Pellow; Mitchell	5:10
7.	"How Much Love (Hang On)"	Pellow; Difford; Mitchell	Pellow; Mitchell	4:28
8.	"I Don't Know Why"	Mitchell; Earl Randle	Pellow; Mitchell	4:16
9.	"Come Back Home"	Pellow; Hallawell	Pellow; Mitchell	6:05
10.	"Searching for You"	Pellow; Difford; Mitchell	Pellow; Mitchell	5:01

=== Weekly charts ===
2006 weekly chart performance for Moonlight Over Memphis
Chart (2006)	Peak position
Scottish Albums Chart	15
UK Albums (Official Charts)	27
