= Don't Need the Sun to Shine (To Make Me Smile) =

2001 single by Gabrielle

Single by Gabrielle

from the album Dreams Can Come True, Greatest Hits Vol. 1
- Released: 22 October 2001
- Length: 3:28
- Label: Go! Beat
- Songwriters: Gabrielle; Jonathan Shorten
- Producer: Jonathan Shorten

Gabrielle singles chronology
"Out of Reach" (2001)	"Don't Need the Sun to Shine (To Make Me Smile)" (2001)	"Stay the Same" (2004)

"Don't Need the Sun to Shine (To Make Me Smile)" is a song by English singer Gabrielle. It was written by Gabrielle and Jonathan Shorten for her greatest hits compilation Dreams Can Come True, Greatest Hits Vol. 1 (2001), spanning her first three albums. Produced by Shorten, the song served as the album's lead single and peaked at number nine on the UK Singles Chart, becoming her 10th top-10 hit in the United Kingdom. Outside the UK, it reached the top 20 in Denmark, New Zealand, and Portugal.

== Track listings ==
UK CD1
No.	Title	Length
1.	"Don't Need the Sun to Shine (To Make Me Smile)" (album version)	3:28
2.	"Don't Need the Sun to Shine (To Make Me Smile)" (E-Smoove remix)	5:31
3.	"Don't Need the Sun to Shine (To Make Me Smile)" (Dimitri & Tom remix)	5:15
4.	"Don't Need the Sun to Shine (To Make Me Smile)" (Agent Sumo remix)	5:37
5.	"Don't Need the Sun to Shine (To Make Me Smile)" (enhanced video)

UK CD2
No.	Title	Length
1.	"Don't Need the Sun to Shine (To Make Me Smile)" (album version)	3:28
2.	"Out of Reach" (acoustic version)	4:21
3.	"Rise" (live version)	5:15

UK cassette single
No.	Title	Length
1.	"Don't Need the Sun to Shine (To Make Me Smile)" (album version)	3:28
2.	"Don't Need the Sun to Shine (To Make Me Smile)" (E-Smoove 7-inch edit)	3:19

UK 12-inch single
No.	Title	Length
1.	"Don't Need the Sun to Shine (To Make Me Smile)" (Agent Sumo remix)	7:02
2.	"Don't Need the Sun to Shine (To Make Me Smile)" (E-Smoove remix)	7:43

European maxi-CD single
No.	Title	Length
1.	"Don't Need the Sun to Shine (To Make Me Smile)"	3:28
2.	"Out of Reach" (acoustic version)	3:08
3.	"Rise" (acoustic version)	3:51
4.	"Dreams" (original unreleased version)	6:21
5.	"Don't Need the Sun to Shine (To Make Me Smile)" (CD ROM video)

== Charts ==
=== Weekly charts ===
Chart (2001–2002)	Peak position
Australia (ARIA)	98
Austria (Ö3 Austria Top 40)	68
Denmark (Tracklisten)	11
Europe (Eurochart Hot 100)	35
Germany (GfK)	88
Netherlands (Single Top 100)	77
New Zealand (Recorded Music NZ)	13
Portugal (AFP)	4
Scotland Singles (OCC)	7
Switzerland (Schweizer Hitparade)	56
UK Singles (OCC)	9
UK Hip Hop/R&B (OCC)	7

=== Year-end charts ===
Chart (2001)	Position
UK Singles (OCC)	168

== Release history ==
Region	Date	Format(s)	Label(s)	Ref.
United Kingdom	22 October 2001	CD; cassette	Go! Beat	
United Kingdom	12 November 2001	12-inch vinyl	Go! Beat	
Australia	14 January 2002	CD	Go! Beat	
