= Sentimental Me (album) =

Studio album by Marti Pellow
- Released: 14 April 2008(UK)
- Recorded: 2007―2008
- Studios: Royal Studios, Memphis; Sphere Studios, London
- Genre: Jazz
- Length: 65:15
- Label: Rhino Records
- Producer: Marti Pellow

Marti Pellow chronology
| Moonlight Over Memphis (2006) | Sentimental Me (2008) | Devil and The Monkey (2010) |

Singles from Sentimental Me
- 1. "Take a Letter Miss Jones" Released: 14 July 2008

Sentimental Me is the fourth studio album by Wet Wet Wet frontman Marti Pellow. Released on 14 April 2008, the album was preceded by the single "Take a Letter, Miss Jones".

The album takes on a number of classic jazz standards, together with jazz pianist Jim Watson. All instrumentation was arranged by Pellow, with a stronger focus on the tempo, enabling a move away from the big band feel usually associated with some of these tracks. The album includes one original composition, "Chicago Rose", written with frequent collaborators Chris Difford and James Hallawell.

== Singles ==
The album's only single was "Take a Letter Miss Jones", which was released on 14 July 2008.

== Chart performance ==
Sentimental Me was not a commercial success. The album debuted and peaked at number 87 on the Scottish Albums Chart on 26 April 2008. The album debuted at number 4 on the UK's Jazz & Blues Albums Chart, appearing on that chart for five consecutive weeks.

== Tour ==
The album was promoted with the Songs for Lovers tour, a 14-date run which took place throughout April 2008.

== Track listing ==
| No. | Title | Writer(s) | Length |
|---|---|---|---|
| 1. | "In A Sentimental Mood" | Duke Ellington; Irving Mills; Manny Kurtz | 5:15 |
| 2. | "A Child is Born" | Thad Jones | 5:08 |
| 3. | "You Don't Know What Love Is" | Don Raye; Gene De Paul | 5:20 |
| 4. | "Who Can I Turn To (When Nobody Needs Me)" | Anthony Newley; Leslie Bricusse | 3:15 |
| 5. | "I've Got You Under My Skin" | Cole Porter | 6:42 |
| 6. | "When The World Was Young" | Johnny Mercer | 4:54 |
| 7. | "Tell Me All About It" | Michael Franks | 5:32 |
| 8. | "You Must Believe In Spring" | Alan Bergman; Jacques Demy; Marilyn Bergman; Michel Legrand | 5:34 |
| 9. | "Summerwind" | Hans Bradtke; Heinz Mayer; Johnny Mercer | 5:15 |
| 10. | "Chicago Rose" | Marti Pellow; Chris Difford; James Hallawell | 5:10 |
| 11. | "I'm Glad There Was You" | Jimmy Dorsey; Paul Mertz | 5:07 |
| 12. | "Take A Letter Miss Jones" | Larry Shay; Lou Holzer | 3:21 |
| 13. | "Lonely Girl" | Jay Livingston; Neal Hefti; Ray Evans |
| 14. | "Where or When" | | 4:29 |

=== Weekly charts ===
2008 weekly chart performance for Sentimental Me
| Chart (2008) | Peak position |
|---|---|
| UK Jazz & Blues Albums Chart | 4 |
| Scottish Albums Chart | 87 |
