= List of UK top-ten albums in 1999 =

The UK Albums Chart is one of many music charts compiled by the Official Charts Company that calculates the best-selling albums of the week in the United Kingdom. Before 2004, the chart was only based on the sales of physical albums. This list shows albums that peaked in the Top 10 of the UK Albums Chart during 1999, as well as albums which peaked in 1998 and 2000 but were in the top 10 in 1999. The entry date is when the album appeared in the top ten for the first time (week ending, as published by the Official Charts Company, which is six days after the chart is announced).

The first new number-one album of the year was You've Come a Long Way, Baby by Fatboy Slim. Overall, fifteen different albums peaked at number-one in 1999, with fifteen unique artists hitting that position.

== Background ==
=== Best-selling albums ===
Shania Twain had the best-selling album of the year with Come On Over. By Request by Boyzone came in second place. The Man Who by Travis, ABBA Gold: Greatest Hits by ABBA and Performance and Cocktails by Stereophonics made up the top five. Albums by Robbie Williams, Steps, The Corrs, Westlife and Macy Gray were also in the top-ten best selling albums of the year.

== Top-ten albums ==
Key

Symbol	Meaning
‡	Album peaked in 1998 but still in chart in 1999.
♦	Album released in 1999 but peaked in 2000.
(#)	Year-end top-ten album position and rank
Entered	The date that the album first appeared in the chart.
Peak	Highest position that the album reached in the UK Albums Chart.

Entered (week ending)	Weeks in top 10	Single	Artist	Peak	Peak reached (week ending)	Weeks at peak
Albums in 1997
1 November 1997	56	Talk on Corners ‡	The Corrs	1	27 June 1998	10
Albums in 1998
17 January 1998	44	Life Thru a Lens ‡	Robbie Williams	1	18 April 1998	2
14 March 1998	20	Ray of Light ‡	Madonna	1	14 March 1998	2
2 May 1998	18	International Velvet ‡	Catatonia	1	16 May 1998	1
6 June 1998	27	Where We Belong ‡	Boyzone	1	6 June 1998	3
4 July 1998	4	Five ‡	Five	1	4 July 1998	1
19 September 1998	10	One Night Only ‡	Bee Gees	4	19 September 1998	1
26 September 1998	10	This Is My Truth Tell Me Yours ‡	Manic Street Preachers	1	26 September 1998	3
26 September 1998	25	Step One ‡	Steps	2	26 September 1998	1
10 October 1998	10	The Miseducation of Lauryn Hill ‡	Lauryn Hill	2	10 October 1998	3
24 October 1998	6	B*Witched ‡	B*Witched	3	24 October 1998	1
31 October 1998	22	You've Come a Long Way, Baby	Fatboy Slim	1	23 January 1999	4
7 November 1998	31	I've Been Expecting You ‡	Robbie Williams	1	7 November 1998	3
7 November 1998	2	Believe	Cher	7	20 March 1999	1
14 November 1998	11	The Best of M People ‡	M People	2	12 December 1998	1
21 November 1998	16	Ladies & Gentlemen: The Best of George Michael ‡	George Michael	1	21 November 1998	8
21 November 1998	11	The Best of 1980-1990 (Single-Disc Version) ‡	U2	4	5 December 1998	1
Albums in 1999
23 January 1999	18	Forgiven, Not Forgotten	The Corrs	2	10 April 1999	1
30 January 1999	1	Big Willie Style	Will Smith	9	30 January 1999	1
6 February 1999	1	There It Is	911	8	6 February 1999	1
6 February 1999	2	Americana	The Offspring	10	6 February 1999	2
20 February 1999	1	Love Songs	Dr. Hook	8	20 February 1999	1
27 February 1999	2	No Exit	Blondie	3	27 February 1999	1
6 March 1999	6	Gran Turismo	The Cardigans	8	6 March 1999	1
13 March 1999	1	Beaucoup Fish	Underworld	3	13 March 1999	1
13 March 1999	15	My Love Is Your Love	Whitney Houston	4	24 July 1999	2
20 March 1999	29	Performance and Cocktails	Stereophonics	1	20 March 1999	1
20 March 1999	17	...Baby One More Time ♦	Britney Spears	2	5 February 2000	1
20 March 1999	1	Peasants, Pigs & Astronauts	Kula Shaker	8	20 March 1999	1
27 March 1999	3	13	Blur	1	27 March 1999	2
10 April 1999	29	ABBA Gold: Greatest Hits	ABBA	1	17 April 1999	5
17 April 1999	1	The Middle of Nowhere	Orbital	4	17 April 1999	1
24 April 1999	5	Equally Cursed and Blessed	Catatonia	1	24 April 1999	1
24 April 1999	1	Maybe You've Been Brainwashed Too	New Radicals	10	24 April 1999	1
1 May 1999	2	Rides	Reef	3	1 May 1999	1
1 May 1999	1	Bury the Hatchet	The Cranberries	7	1 May 1999	1
1 May 1999	1	Mule Variations	Tom Waits	9	1 May 1999	1
8 May 1999	6	FanMail	TLC	7	8 May 1999	2
8 May 1999	1	Twisted Tenderness	Electronic	9	8 May 1999	1
15 May 1999	2	Head Music	Suede	1	15 May 1999	1
15 May 1999	2	Star Wars Episode I: The Phantom Menace – Original Motion Picture Soundtrack	John Williams and the London Symphony Orchestra	8	15 May 1999	1
22 May 1999	12	The Hush	Texas	1	22 May 1999	1
22 May 1999	2	Remedy	Basement Jaxx	4	22 May 1999	1
29 May 1999	3	Millennium	Backstreet Boys	2	29 May 1999	1
29 May 1999	1	Magic Hour	Cast	6	29 May 1999	1
5 June 1999	51	Come On Over	Shania Twain	1	11 September 1999	11
5 June 1999	48	The Man Who	Travis	1	28 August 1999	9
5 June 1999	12	The Very Best of Dean Martin – The Capitol & Reprise Years	Dean Martin	5	26 June 1999	1
12 June 1999	20	By Request	Boyzone	1	12 June 1999	9
12 June 1999	2	Going for Gold	Shed Seven	7	12 June 1999	1
19 June 1999	2	Schizophrenic	Geri Halliwell	4	19 June 1999	1
19 June 1999	4	Californication	Red Hot Chili Peppers	5	19 June 1999	1
26 June 1999	7	Synkronized	Jamiroquai	1	26 June 1999	1
26 June 1999	1	Guerrilla	Super Furry Animals	10	26 June 1999	1
3 July 1999	6	Surrender	The Chemical Brothers	1	3 July 1999	1
10 July 1999	10	The Party Album	Vengaboys	6	31 July 1999	1
17 July 1999	7	Ricky Martin	Ricky Martin	2	31 July 1999	3
14 August 1999	4	The Very Best of Elvis Costello	Elvis Costello	4	14 August 1999	1
28 August 1999	1	Mary	Mary J. Blige	5	28 August 1999	1
4 September 1999	5	Sogno	Andrea Bocelli	4	4 September 1999	1
4 September 1999	1	Forever	Puff Daddy	9	4 September 1999	1
11 September 1999	2	A Secret History... The Best of the Divine Comedy	The Divine Comedy	3	11 September 1999	1
11 September 1999	1	Yesterday Went Too Soon	Feeder	8	11 September 1999	1
18 September 1999	2	You Me & Us	Martine McCutcheon	2	18 September 1999	1
25 September 1999	3	Liquid Skin	Gomez	2	25 September 1999	1
25 September 1999	2	One from the Modern	Ocean Colour Scene	4	25 September 1999	1
25 September 1999	1	Nexus	Another Level	7	25 September 1999	1
25 September 1999	1	Yellow Submarine Songtrack	The Beatles	8	25 September 1999	1
2 October 1999	3	Rhythm and Stealth	Leftfield	1	2 October 1999	1
2 October 1999	3	Supergrass	Supergrass	3	2 October 1999	1
2 October 1999	1	Greatest Hits	Daniel O'Donnell	10	2 October 1999	1
9 October 1999	25	Reload	Tom Jones	1	9 October 1999	3
9 October 1999	3	Brand New Day	Sting	5	9 October 1999	1
9 October 1999	1	The Fragile	Nine Inch Nails	10	9 October 1999	1
16 October 1999	11	S Club	S Club 7	2	16 October 1999	1
16 October 1999	1	Hours	David Bowie	5	16 October 1999	1
16 October 1999	27	On How Life Is	Macy Gray	3	6 November 1999	3
23 October 1999	2	Millionaires	James	2	23 October 1999	1
23 October 1999	1	Nightlife	Pet Shop Boys	7	23 October 1999	1
30 October 1999	1	Us and Us Only	The Charlatans	2	30 October 1999	1
30 October 1999	2	Peace	Eurythmics	4	30 October 1999	1
30 October 1999	2	Awake and Breathe	B*Witched	5	30 October 1999	1
30 October 1999	8	Northern Star ♦	Melanie C	4	2 September 2000	1
6 November 1999	11	Steptacular	Steps	1	6 November 1999	4
6 November 1999	3	Turn It On Again: The Hits	Genesis	4	6 November 1999	1
6 November 1999	1	Clapton Chronicles: The Best of Eric Clapton	Eric Clapton	6	6 November 1999	1
13 November 1999	23	Westlife	Westlife	2	13 November 1999	1
13 November 1999	1	Love and the Russian Winter	Simply Red	6	13 November 1999	1
13 November 1999	1	Rainbow	Mariah Carey	8	13 November 1999	1
13 November 1999	1	Twenty Four Seven	Tina Turner	9	13 November 1999	1
13 November 1999	1	There Is Nothing Left to Lose	Foo Fighters	10	13 November 1999	1
20 November 1999	4	Invincible	Five	4	20 November 1999	1
20 November 1999	4	Greatest Hits III	Queen	5	20 November 1999	1
20 November 1999	3	The Greatest Hits	Cher	7	20 November 1999	1
20 November 1999	1	Heart and Soul: New Songs from Ally McBeal	Vonda Shepard	9	20 November 1999	1
27 November 1999	10	All the Way... A Decade of Song	Celine Dion	1	27 November 1999	1
27 November 1999	2	The Corrs Unplugged ♦	The Corrs	7	1 January 2000	1
4 December 1999	3	Charlotte Church	Charlotte Church	8	11 December 1999	1
4 December 1999	1	Willenium	Will Smith	10	11 December 1999	1
18 December 1999	3	Songs from the Last Century	George Michael	2	18 December 1999	1

== See also ==
- 1999 in British music
- List of number-one albums from the 1990s (UK)
