= Should I Stay =

2000 single by Gabrielle

Single by Gabrielle

from the album Rise
- B-side: "5 O'Clock"
- Released: 23 October 2000
- Length: 3:56
- Label: Go! Beat
- Songwriters: Gabrielle; Jon Sharp
- Producers: Jonny Dollar; Simon Richmond

Gabrielle singles chronology
"When a Woman" (2000)	"Should I Stay" (2000)	"Out of Reach" (2001)

"Should I Stay" is a song by British singer Gabrielle. It was released as a single in October 2000 and was the fourth and final single released from her third studio album, Rise (1999). The song charted at No. 13 on the UK Singles Chart. The video for the single depicts a moody atmosphere rather than having a linear storyline.

== Track listings ==
UK CD: 1
No.	Title	Length
1.	"Should I Stay" (album version)	3:59
2.	"Should I Stay" (Junior Vasquez classic mix edit)	7:42
3.	"5 O'Clock" (Sunship vocal mix)	5:55

UK CD: 2
No.	Title	Length
1.	"Should I Stay"	3:59
2.	"When a Woman"	3:11
3.	"Rise"	3:39

UK 12-inch single
No.	Title	Length
1.	"Should I Stay" (Satoshi Tomiie club mix edit)	7:52
2.	"Should I Stay" (Junior Vasquez classic mix edit)	7:42
3.	"5 O'Clock" (Architechs mix)	5:19
4.	"5 O'Clock" (Sunship vocal mix)	5:55

UK cassette single
No.	Title	Length
1.	"Should I Stay"	3:59
2.	"5 O'Clock" (Sunship vocal mix)	5:55

European maxi-CD single
No.	Title	Length
1.	"Should I Stay"	3:59
2.	"Should I Stay" (Junior Vasquez classic mix edit)	7:42
3.	"Should I Stay" (Satoshi Tomiie club mix edit)	7:52
4.	"Should I Stay" (Satoshi Tomiie dub 1 mix)	6:41

== Charts ==
Chart (2000)	Peak position
Europe (Eurochart Hot 100)	53
Scottish Singles Sales (Official Charts)	13
UK Singles (Official Charts)	13
UK Hip Hop/R&B (Official Charts)	3
