= Between the Covers (album) =

Studio album by Marti Pellow
- Released: 17 November 2003 (UK)
- Recorded: 2003
- Studio: Porterhouse Studios
- Genres: Pop; pop rock
- Label: Universal Records
- Producers: Chris Porter; Rick Mitra; Marti Pellow

Marti Pellow chronology
Marti Pellow Sings the Hits of Wet Wet Wet & Smile (2002)	Between the Covers (2003)	Moonlight Over Memphis (2006)

Singles from Between the Covers
- 1. "A Lot of Love" Released: 10 November 2003

Between the Covers is the second studio album by Wet Wet Wet frontman Marti Pellow. Released on 17 November 2003, it spawned the single "A Lot of Love", a cover of the original by Neil Young.

The album was recorded in 2003, during downtime in the studio, in which Pellow came up with the idea of recording an album of songs that he and his band regularly "mess about with" in soundcheck whilst performing live. The album was produced entirely by Chris Porter and Rick Mitra, with the exception of "Hard to Cry", which was included on this album as a dedication to Pellow's late mother.

The recording of "From Russia With Love", originally released as a B-side and then later as a bonus track on streaming services, was taken from the ITV1 special "Songs of James Bond", first broadcast in November 2002.

== Singles ==
Only one single was released in promotion of the album; "A Lot of Love" was released on 10 November 2003 and debuted and peaked at number 59 on both the UK Singles and UK Physical Singles charts, respectively.

== Chart performance ==
Between the Covers debuted at number 40 on the Scottish Albums Chart and at number 66 on the UK Albums Chart.

== Track listing ==
No.	Title	Writer(s)	Producer(s)	Length
1.	"A Lot of Love"	Neil Young	Chris Porter; Rick Mitra	3:38
2.	"Brand New Start"	Paul Weller	Chris Porter; Rick Mitra	3:51
3.	"Fire and Rain"	James Taylor	Chris Porter; Rick Mitra	4:38
4.	"Follow You, Follow Me"	Phil Collins; Mike Rutherford; Tony Banks	Chris Porter; Rick Mitra	4:01
5.	"Creepin'"	Stevie Wonder	Chris Porter; Rick Mitra	4:20
6.	"Mary Jane's Last Dance"	Tom Petty	Chris Porter; Rick Mitra	4:24
7.	"Brass in Pocket"	Chrissie Hynde; James Honeyman-Scott	Chris Porter; Rick Mitra	3:04
8.	"The River"	Joni Mitchell	Chris Porter; Rick Mitra	6:22
9.	"Grandma's Hands"	Bill Withers	Chris Porter; Rick Mitra	3:45
10.	"Suzanne"	Leonard Cohen	Chris Porter; Rick Mitra	4:26
11.	"Don't Let Me Down"	John Lennon; Paul McCartney	Chris Porter; Rick Mitra	4:23
12.	"Hard to Cry"	Marti Pellow; Chris Difford; Andrew Caine	Pellow	3:39
13.	"From Russia With Love" (Complete Edition bonus track)	Lionel Bart	Amanda Ross	4:11

=== Weekly charts ===
2003 weekly chart performance for Between the Covers
Chart (2003)	Peak position
Scottish Albums Chart	40
UK Albums (Official Charts)	66
