= Out of Reach (song) =

2001 single by Gabrielle

Single by Gabrielle

from the album Bridget Jones's Diary: Music from the Motion Picture and Rise (re-issue)
- Released: 9 April 2001
- Studio: Mayfair, Metropolis (Londo, England)
- Length: 3:18
- Label: Go! Beat
- Songwriters: Gabrielle; Jonathan Shorten
- Producer: Jonathan Shorten

Gabrielle singles chronology
"Should I Stay" (2000)	"Out of Reach" (2001)	"Don't Need the Sun to Shine (To Make Me Smile)" (2001)

"Out of Reach" is a song by English singer Gabrielle. It was written by Gabrielle and frequent collaborator Jonathan Shorten for the soundtrack of Sharon Maguire's 2001 romantic comedy film Bridget Jones's Diary. The London Session Orchestra provides the string section on the track.

Released as the soundtrack's lead single on 9 April 2001, "Out of Reach" peaked at number one in Portugal, number two in New Zealand, and number four in the United Kingdom. As of October 2026, the song had sold 1,200,000 copies in the UK, and it ended 2001 as New Zealand's 10th-most successful single. It was later included in the 2001 reissue of her Rise album as well as her greatest hits compilation Dreams Can Come True, Greatest Hits Vol. 1, released the same year.

== Music video ==
The official music video features Gabrielle singing the song whilst wearing dark sunglasses and a large black leather jacket, intercut with clips from Bridget Jones's Diary. The video also featured Don Gilet.

== Track listings ==
UK CD1
No.	Title	Length
1.	"Out of Reach"	3:20
2.	"Out of Reach" (Sunship remix)	5:22
3.	"Out of Reach" (Architechs remix)	4:38

UK CD2
No.	Title	Length
1.	"Out of Reach"	3:20
2.	"Out of Reach" (Blacksmith Rerub mix)	4:44
3.	"Out of Reach" (Almighty remix)	7:27
4.	"Out of Reach" (CR ROM video)	3:12

UK cassette single
No.	Title	Length
1.	"Out of Reach"	3:20
2.	"Out of Reach" (Sunship remix)	5:22

European CD single
No.	Title	Length
1.	"Out of Reach"	3:20
2.	"Out of Reach" (Almighty remix)	7:27

Australasian CD1 and Japanese CD single
No.	Title	Length
1.	"Out of Reach"	3:39
2.	"Out of Reach" (Almighty mix)	7:26
3.	"Out of Reach" (Sunship mix)	5:21
4.	"Out of Reach" (Architechs remix)	4:35
5.	"Out of Reach" (Blacksmith Rerub mix)	4:44

Australasian CD2
No.	Title	Length
1.	"Out of Reach"	3:20
2.	"Out of Reach" (Almighty radio edit)	3:48
3.	"Out of Reach" (Almighty mix)	7:27
4.	"Out of Reach" (Sunship mix)	5:21
5.	"Out of Reach" (Architechs remix)	4:35
6.	"Out of Reach" (Blacksmith Rerub mix)	4:44

== Credits and personnel ==
Credits are adapted from the UK CD single liner notes.

Studios

- Recorded at Mayfair Studios and Metropolis Studios (London)
- Mixed at Sarm West Studios (London)

Personnel

- Gabrielle – writing, lead vocals
- Jonathan Shorten – writing, keyboard, production
- Maria Lawson – backing vocals
- Marion Powell – backing vocals
- Paul Noble – guitar
- Derrick Taylor – bass guitar
- Dylan Howe – drums
- The London Session Orchestra – strings
- Jason Hazeley – string arrangement
- John Brough – engineering

== Charts ==
=== Weekly charts ===
Chart (2001–2002)	Peak position
Australia (ARIA)	9
Austria (Ö3 Austria Top 40)	52
Belgium (Ultratop 50 Flanders)	28
Denmark (Tracklisten)	13
Europe (Eurochart Hot 100)	17
Germany (GfK)	71
Ireland (IRMA)	3
Italy (FIMI)	33
Netherlands (Dutch Top 40)	10
Netherlands (Single Top 100)	12
New Zealand (Recorded Music NZ)	2
Norway (VG-lista)	10
Portugal (AFP)	1
Scottish Singles Sales (Official Charts)	4
Sweden (Sverigetopplistan)	8
Switzerland (Schweizer Hitparade)	8
UK Singles (Official Charts)	4
UK Hip Hop/R&B (Official Charts)	2

Chart (2014)	Peak position
France (SNEP)	178

=== Year-end charts ===
Chart (2001)	Position
Australia (ARIA)	37
Europe (Eurochart Hot 100)	72
Ireland (IRMA)	18
Netherlands (Dutch Top 40)	37
Netherlands (Single Top 100)	51
New Zealand (RIANZ)	10
Sweden (Hitlistan)	65
Switzerland (Schweizer Hitparade)	53
UK Singles (OCC)	24

== Certifications ==
Region	Certification	Certified units/sales
Australia (ARIA)	Platinum	70,000^{^}
New Zealand (RMNZ)	Platinum	30,000^{‡}
United Kingdom (BPI)	2× Platinum	1,200,000^{‡}
^{^} Shipments figures based on certification alone.^{‡} Sales+streaming figures based on certification alone.

== Release history ==
Region	Date	Format(s)	Label(s)	Ref.
United Kingdom	9 April 2001	12-inch vinyl; CD; cassette	Go! Beat	
Australia	23 July 2001	CD1	Go! Beat	
Japan	29 August 2001	CD	Go! Beat	
Australia	24 September 2001	CD2	Go! Beat	
United States	8 October 2001	Hot adult contemporary radio	Go! Beat; Universal	
