= Smile (Marti Pellow album) =

Studio album by Marti Pellow
- Released: 25 June 2001 (UK)
- Recorded: 2000–2001
- Studio: Royal Studios, Memphis
- Genre: Pop; soul
- Label: Mercury Records
- Producer: Marti Pellow; Peter Collins; Andy Wright; Willie Mitchell

Marti Pellow chronology
Smile (2001)	Marti Pellow Sings the Hits of Wet Wet Wet & Smile (2002)

Singles from Smile
- 1. "Close To You" Released: 4 June 2001; 2. "I've Been Around the World" Released: 19 November 2001

Smile is the debut solo album by Scottish singer Marti Pellow. Released on June 25, 2001, the album spawned two singles: "Close to You" and "I've Been Around the World". "Hard to Cry" was also later released as a radio-only promotional single in 2003, having been included on both of Pellow's follow-up albums: Marti Pellow Sings the Hits of Wet Wet Wet & Smile (2002) and Between the Covers (2003). The album debuted at number 7 on the UK Albums Chart in July 2001.

== Production ==
The album was co-written in its entirety by Squeeze frontman Chris Difford, and was predominantly recorded at Royal Studios in Memphis, alongside frequent collaborator Willie Mitchell, whom Pellow had been friends with since the early days of Wet Wet Wet. Pellow also recorded a number of songs alongside Paul Inder at The Pink Room, which served mainly as B-sides to the album's two singles. "Moment of Truth", co-written by former bandmate Graeme Clark, was one of a number of tracks written for a potential sixth Wet Wet Wet album prior to the break-up of the band in 1999.

During his Pellow Talk tour in 2022, Pellow confirmed that the majority of the album was written as a form of therapy following six months in rehabilitation for alcohol and drug abuse. Stylistically, the album adopts much of the soft-rock/soul style of the latter Wet Wet Wet albums.

== Promotion ==
To promote the album, Pellow made a cameo appearance in Emmerdale, where he performed Close to You in the Woolpack for the departure of Kathy Glover. Pellow also made appearances on Top of the Pops to promote both single releases.

A "complete edition" of the album containing all eight B-sides was released onto streaming services in 2021 to celebrate the twentieth anniversary of the album. These include the first version of Pellow's cover of "The River" by Joni Mitchell, which he would later re-record for his Between the Covers album.

== Singles ==
The album's first single, "Close to You", was released on 4 June 2001. The single peaked at number 9 on the UK Singles Chart and stayed on the chart for 9 non-consecutive weeks.

The second and final single released from the album was "I've Been Around The World". The single, released on 19 November 2001, debuted and peaked at number 28 on the UK Singles Chart.

== Track listing ==
No.	Title	Writer(s)	Producer(s)	Length
1.	"Hard to Cry"	Marti Pellow; Chris Difford; A. Caine	Pellow	3:39
2.	"Close to You"	Pellow; Difford; James Hallawell	Peter Collins	4:16
3.	"Did You Ever Wake Up?"	Pellow; Difford; Hallawell	Pellow	4:40
4.	"All I Ever Wanted"	Pellow; Difford	Pellow; Andy Wright	4:04
5.	"I've Been Around the World"	Pellow; Hallawell; Willie Mitchell	Pellow; Mitchell	4:34
6.	"This Moment is OK"	Pellow; Difford; Hallawell	Collins	4:16
7.	"New York Vibe"	Pellow; Difford; Caine	Pellow	5:15
8.	"London Life"	Pellow; Difford; Steve Booker	Pellow	5:58
9.	"Moment of Truth"	Pellow; Difford; Graeme Clark	Pellow	5:06
10.	"She Can Lean on Me"	Pellow; Difford; Hallawell	Pellow; Mitchell	5:32
11.	"The Missing Sound"	Pellow; Mitchell; Thomas Bingham	Pellow; Mitchell	5:02
12.	"Memphis Moonlight"	Pellow; Difford; Hallawell; Mitchell	Pellow; Mitchell	7:49

Smile: Complete Edition
No.	Title	Writer(s)	Producer(s)	Length
13.	"Maybe One Day"	Pellow; Difford; D. Mundy	Pellow	2:53
14.	"One Woman"	Pellow; Difford; Paul Inder	Pellow	4:31
15.	"Rain on My Parade"	Pellow; Difford; Mark Taylor	Pellow	4:19
16.	"Coming Home"	Pellow; Difford; D. Mundy	Pellow	3:54
17.	"Out of This World"	Pellow; Difford; B. Hewerdene	Pellow	4:13
18.	"The River"	Joni Mitchell	Pellow	4:08
19.	"Walk Away"	Pellow; Difford; F. Dunnery	Pellow	4:23
20.	"Universal Bus"	Pellow; Difford; Marcella Detroit	Pellow	3:37

== Weekly charts ==
2001 weekly chart performance for Smile
Chart (2001)	Peak position
UK Albums (OCC)	7
