= When a Woman =

2000 single by Gabrielle

Single by Gabrielle

from the album Rise
- B-side: "Make You Wanna Holler"
- Released: 5 June 2000
- Studio: Windmill Lane (Dublin, Ireland); Biffco
- Length: 3:12
- Label: Go! Beat
- Songwriters: Gabrielle; Richard Stannard; Julian Gallagher
- Producers: Richard Stannard; Julian Gallagher

Gabrielle singles chronology
"Rise" (2000)	"When a Woman" (2000)	"Should I Stay" (2000)

"When a Woman" is a song by English recording artist Gabrielle. It was written by Gabrielle along with Richard Stannard and Julian Gallagher and released as the third single from her third album, Rise (1999), on 5 June 2000. The song reached number six on the UK Singles Chart, becoming the second-highest-charting single from the album as well as Gabrielle's eighth top-10 hit.

== Track listings ==
UK CD1
No.	Title	Length
1.	"When a Woman" (album version)	3:13
2.	"When a Woman" (Seb Fontaine mix—12-inch edit)	5:19
3.	"When a Woman" (Bini & Martini power mix—12-inch edit)	6:16
4.	"When a Woman" (Restless Natives groove mix featuring MC DT)	4:54

UK CD2
No.	Title	Length
1.	"When a Woman"	3:12
2.	"Rise" (acoustic version)	3:55
3.	"Make You Wanna Holler" (The R'n'B Joyride mix)	4:40

UK 12-inch single
No.	Title	Length
1.	"When a Woman" (Seb Fontaine mix)	7:20
2.	"When a Woman" (Bini & Martini power mix—12-inch edit)	7:49
3.	"When a Woman" (Restless Natives groove mix featuring MC DT)	4:52
4.	"When a Woman" (Bini & Martini XX-Large dub)	9:51

UK cassette single
No.	Title	Length
1.	"When a Woman"	3:12
2.	"Rise" (acoustic version)	3:55

European maxi-CD single
No.	Title	Length
1.	"When a Woman" (album version)	3:11
2.	"When a Woman" (Restless Native groove mix)	4:51
3.	"When a Woman" (Seb Fontaine mix)	5:18
4.	"Makes Me Wanna Holler"	4:44
5.	"Rise" (acoustic version)	3:52

== Credits and personnel ==
Credits are lifted from the Rise album booklet.

Studios

- Recorded at Windmill Lane Studios (Dublin, Ireland) and Biffco Studio

Personnel

- Gabrielle – writing, vocals
- Richard Stannard – writing, production
- Julian Gallagher – writing, production
- John Themis – guitars
- Eamonn Nolan – flugelhorn
- Stephen McKeon – string arrangement
- Adrian Bushby – mixing

== Charts ==
=== Weekly charts ===
Chart (2000)	Peak position
Australia (ARIA)	124
Belgium (Ultratip Bubbling Under Flanders)	13
Belgium (Ultratip Bubbling Under Wallonia)	6
Europe (Eurochart Hot 100)	33
Germany (GfK)	65
Ireland (IRMA)	27
Netherlands (Single Top 100)	59
Scotland Singles (OCC)	9
Switzerland (Schweizer Hitparade)	30
UK Singles (OCC)	6
UK Hip Hop/R&B (OCC)	3

=== Year-end charts ===
Chart (2000)	Position
UK Singles (OCC)	144

== Certifications ==
Region	Certification	Certified units/sales
United Kingdom (BPI)	Silver	200,000^{‡}
^{‡} Sales+streaming figures based on certification alone.
