= Greatest Hits: Shining Like a National Guitar =

- Cover art by Lynn Goldsmith

Greatest hits album by Paul Simon
- Released: May 23, 2000
- Recorded: 1972–1997
- Genre: Folk rock, soft rock, worldbeat
- Length: 77:06
- Label: Warner Music Group
- Producer: Paul Simon, Roy Halee, Oscar Hernández, Phil Ramone, Russ Titelman, Muscle Shoals

Paul Simon chronology
| Songs from The Capeman (1997) | Greatest Hits: Shining Like a National Guitar (2000) | You're the One (2000) |

Greatest Hits: Shining Like a National Guitar is the fifth greatest hits album by the American singer-songwriter Paul Simon, released on May 23, 2000, by the Warner Music Group. Although the album was a chart success across Europe, it was not issued in the United States. The title of the album is taken from the first line of the song "Graceland".

== Reception ==
Professional ratings
Review scores
| Source | Rating |
|---|---|
| AllMusic | 4.5/5 stars |
| Encyclopedia of Popular Music | 5/5 stars |

William Ruhlmann of AllMusic called it "by far the best [Paul Simon] collection ever released".

== Track listing ==
| # | Song | Year | Time |
|---|---|---|---|
| 1 | "Graceland" | 1986 | 4:47 |
| 2 | "You Can Call Me Al" | 1986 | 4:41 |
| 3 | "Mother and Child Reunion" | 1972 | 2:59 |
| 4 | "The Cool, Cool River" | 1990 | 4:33 |
| 5 | "50 Ways to Leave Your Lover" | 1976 | 3:07 |
| 6 | "The Obvious Child" | 1990 | 4:11 |
| 7 | "The Boy in the Bubble" | 1987 | 3:57 |
| 8 | "Rene and Georgette Magritte with Their Dog after the War" | 1983 | 3:43 |
| 9 | "Late in the Evening" | 1980 | 3:54 |
| 10 | "Bernadette" | 1997 | 3:28 |
| 11 | "Slip Slidin' Away" | 1977 | 4:45 |
| 12 | "Take Me to the Mardi Gras" | 1973 | 3:22 |
| 13 | "Diamonds on the Soles of Her Shoes" | 1987 | 5:49 |
| 14 | "Still Crazy After All These Years" | 1976 | 3:22 |
| 15 | "Kodachrome" | 1973 | 3:28 |
| 16 | "Loves Me Like a Rock" | 1973 | 3:14 |
| 17 | "Me and Julio Down by the Schoolyard" | 1972 | 2:43 |
| 18 | "Hearts and Bones" | 1983 | 5:38 |
| 19 | "Trailways Bus" | 1997 | 5:15 |

== Certifications ==
| Region | Certification | Certified units/sales |
|---|---|---|
| Australia (ARIA) | Platinum | 70,000^{^} |
| Canada (Music Canada) | Gold | 50,000^{^} |
| United Kingdom (BPI) | Gold | 100,000^{^} |
^{^} Shipments figures based on certification alone.
