= Sunshine (Gabrielle song) =

1999 single by Gabrielle

Single by Gabrielle

from the album Rise
- Released: 27 September 1999
- Length: 4:12
- Label: Go! Beat
- Songwriters: Gabrielle; Jonathan Shorten
- Producers: Jonathan Shorten; Richie Fermie

Gabrielle singles chronology
"Walk On By" (1997)	"Sunshine" (1999)	"Rise" (2000)

"Sunshine" is a song by English singer Gabrielle. It was written by Gabrielle and Jonathan Shorten for her third album, Rise (1999). Released as the album's lead single, the song became her sixth top-10 hit on the UK Singles Chart, peaking at number nine.

In 2019, DJ Spoony together with Katie Chatburn and the Ignition Orchestra featuring Gabrielle recorded an orchestral version of the Wookie remix for the UK garage covers album Garage Classical. In September 2019, NME included the Wookie remix of "Sunshine" in their "25 essential UK garage anthems" list.

== Track listings ==
UK CD1
No.	Title	Length
1.	"Sunshine" (radio edit)	3:39
2.	"Sunshine" (Frankie Knuckles classic club mix)	8:51
3.	"Sunshine" (Frankie Knuckles Mambo Sunset reprise)	7:26

UK CD2
No.	Title	Length
1.	"Sunshine" (radio edit)	3:39
2.	"Sunshine" (K-Gee edit)	4:21
3.	"Sunshine" (Wookie main mix)	5:15

UK 12-inch single
No.	Title	Length
1.	"Sunshine" (Frankie Knuckles Mambo Sunset reprise)	7:26
2.	"Sunshine" (Freezzy Jam mix)	7:12
3.	"Sunshine" (Wookie main mix)	5:15
4.	"Sunshine" (K-Gee mix)	4:31

UK cassette single and European CD single
No.	Title	Length
1.	"Sunshine" (album version)	4:13
2.	"Sunshine" (Frankie Knuckles classic radio)	4:13

== Credits and personnel ==
Credits are lifted from the Rise album booklet.

Studios

- Produced at Trident Studios (London, England)
- Mixed at The Church (London, England)

Personnel

- Gabrielle – writing, vocals, backing vocals
- Jonathan Shorten – writing, keyboards, string arrangement, production
- Mary Pearce – backing vocals
- Linda Muriel – backing vocals
- Chris Ballin – backing vocals
- Chris Newton – backing vocals
- Paul Noble – bass, guitars
- Richie Fermie – drum programming, production
- The London Session Orchestra – strings, brass
- Howard Gott – violin
- Lucy Wilkins – violin
- Everton K C Nelson – violin
- Sophie Sirota – violas
- Sarah Wilson – cello
- Jason Hazeley – string arrangement, brass arrangement
- John Brough – mixing

== Charts ==
=== Weekly charts ===
Chart (1999–2000)	Peak position
Europe (Eurochart Hot 100)	42
Netherlands (Single Top 100)	98
Scotland Singles (OCC)	19
UK Singles (OCC)	9
UK Hip Hop/R&B (OCC)	2

=== Year-end charts ===
Chart (1999)	Position
UK Singles (OCC)	155

== Certifications ==
Region	Certification	Certified units/sales
United Kingdom (BPI)	Gold	400,000^{‡}
^{‡} Sales+streaming figures based on certification alone.
