= List of UK Independent Singles Chart number ones of 2001 =

These are the Official Charts Company UK Official Indie Chart number one hits of 2001.

Issue date	Song	Artist
6 January	"Can We Fix It?"	Bob the Builder
13 January	"It's the Way You Make Me Feel"	Steps
13 January	"It's the Way You Make Me Feel"	Steps
20 January	"Buck Rogers"	Feeder
27 January	"Buck Rogers"	Feeder
3 February	"Oh No"	Mos Def with Pharoahe Monch & Nate Dogg
10 February	"Shining Light"	Ash
17 February	"Stutter"	Joe
24 February	"The Call"	Backstreet Boys
3 March	"Stutter"	Joe
10 March	"The Vision"	Mario Più Pts. DJ Arabesque
17 March	"The Vision"	Mario Più Pts. DJ Arabesque
24 March	"Plug In Baby"	Muse
31 March	"Mr. Writer"	Stereophonics
7 April	"Mr. Writer"	Stereophonics
14 April	"Burn Baby Burn"	Ash
21 April	"Flesh"	Jan Johnson
28 April	"Straight Up (No Bends)"	Brian Harvey
5 May	"Dream On"	Depeche Mode
12 May	"Strange World"	Push
19 May	"Pissing in the Wind"	Badly Drawn Boy
26 May	"Ya Don't See the Signs"	Mark B & Blade
2 June	"Star 69"	Fat Boy Slim
9 June	"No Flow"	Lisa Roxanne
16 June	"Romeo"	Basement Jaxx
23 June	"Have a Nice Day"	Stereophonics
30 June	"Romeo"	Basement Jaxx
7 July	"Hard to Explain"/"New York City Cops"	The Strokes
14 July	"Turn"	Feeder
21 July	"Pop"	NSYNC
28 July	"Pop"	NSYNC
4 August	"Do the Lollipop"	Tweenies
11 August	"I Feel Loved"	Depeche Mode
18 August	"Hidden Place"	Björk
25 August	"Superstylin'"	Groove Armada
1 September	"Superstylin'"	Groove Armada
8 September	"Superstylin'"	Groove Armada
15 September	"Mambo No. 5"	Bob the Builder
22 September	"Mambo No. 5"	Bob the Builder
29 September	"Mambo No. 5"	Bob the Builder
6 October	"Chain Reaction"/"One for Sorrow"	Steps
13 October	"Chain Reaction"/"One for Sorrow"	Steps
20 October	"Chain Reaction"/"One for Sorrow"	Steps
27 October	"I'm a Slave 4 U"	Britney Spears
3 November	"I'm a Slave 4 U"	Britney Spears
10 November	"I'm a Slave 4 U"	Britney Spears
17 November	"Last Nite"	The Strokes
24 November	"Hotel Yorba"	The White Stripes
1 December	"Hyper Music / Feeling Good"	Muse
8 December	"ResuRection"	PPK
15 December	"Handbags and Gladrags"	The Stereophonics
22 December	"Handbags and Gladrags"	The Stereophonics
29 December	"How Wonderful You Are"	Gordon Haskell

== See also ==
- 2001 in music
