= Rise (Gabrielle album) =

1999 studio album by Gabrielle

- North American cover, the international edition has the album’s text in center with a reflection.

Studio album by Gabrielle
- Released: 18 October 1999
- Length: 42:45
- Labels: Go! Beat; Universal
- Producers: Jonny Dollar; Richie Fermie; Julian Gallagher; Simon Richmond; Jonathan Shorten; Richard Stannard; Ferdy Unger-Hamilton

Gabrielle chronology
Gabrielle (1996)	Rise (1999)	Dreams Can Come True, Greatest Hits Vol. 1 (2001)

Singles from Rise
- 1. "Sunshine" Released: 27 September 1999; 2. "Rise" Released: 24 January 2000; 3. "When a Woman" Released: 5 June 2000; 4. "Should I Stay" Released: 23 October 2000; 5. "Out of Reach" Released: 9 April 2001

Rise is the third studio album by English singer and songwriter Gabrielle. It was released by Go! Beat Records on 18 October 1999 in the United Kingdom. The album produced several successful singles, including the UK top 10 hit " Sunshine," the UK number-one title track, the top 10 follow-up "When a Woman," the UK top 20 single "Should I Stay" and the later hit "Out of Reach" which earned Platinum certification and achieved strong international chart performance.

Critics generally praised Rise as a polished and sophisticated adult pop and soul album, highlighting Gabrielle’s smooth vocal performance and the production’s blend of classic soul, orchestration, and contemporary influences, though some noted inconsistencies and weaker tracks. Commercially, it was a major success, debuting at number one on the UK Albums Chart, achieving 4× Platinum status, and becoming Gabrielle's biggest international success, with strong chart performances and certifications across several European territories.

== Promotion ==
Rise was preceded by the single "Sunshine," which became a UK top 10 hit. The album's follow-up single, "Rise," was released in 2000 and became another hit single for Gabrielle's biggest hit since "Dreams" (1993), reaching number one on the UK Singles Chart and achieving strong international success, including top 10 placements in Ireland, New Zealand, Norway, Austria, Switzerland, and Sweden, while also charting in Australia and Germany.

The follow-up single "When a Woman" continued the album's commercial performance, reaching the UK top 10 and charting across several European territories, though with more modest international impact "Should I Stay" was released later in 2000 as the third single from the album and charted in the UK top 20. In 2001, "Out of Reach" was released as part of the Bridget Jones's Diary soundtrack and later included on the reissued edition of Rise. It became one of Gabrielle's most successful singles, reaching number 4 in the UK and achieving Platinum certification, while also charting strongly in Australia, Ireland, New Zealand, and across Europe.

== Critical reception ==
Professional ratings
Review scores
Source	Rating
AllMusic	3.5/5 stars
MTV Asia	8/10
NME	2.5/5 stars
Q	3/5 stars

Charlotte Robinson of PopMatters highlighted Rise as a strong adult pop record, praising its blend of "orchestrated pop, adult contemporary ballads, and slick soul" and Gabrielle's "smooth, relaxed vocals" and expressive delivery. She commended the production for combining traditional pop and soul influences with contemporary touches, arguing that elements such as hip-hop beats, strings, and acoustic textures help keep the album "fresh and interesting." Ming Kang from MTV Asia similarly praised the album's use of "retrospective beats" alongside modern production, particularly on "When a Woman," suggesting that Gabrielle's voice and "old-school soul" sensibility suit its smooth, club-oriented sound.

AllMusic critic Jose F. Promis characterised the album as "sophisticated, mellow British soul-pop" with a light 1960s influence, describing the it overall as "a good album." Q editor Paul Elliott declared Rise as Gabrielle's strongest album, crediting Johnny Dollar's production for its polished and cohesive sound. He observed that while tracks such as "Falling" and "When a Woman" were "horribly contrived," the album's slower material better suited Gabrielle's "warm, breathy vocals." NME was more critical, describing Rise as largely pleasant but uneven, noting that much of the album was considered "disappointingly uninspired and lazily derivative." However, the magazine still acknowledged Gabrielle's vocal performance as retaining "that superstar quality," marked by "vulnerability and sincerity" that continues to define her appeal.

== Commercial performance ==
Rise was a major commercial success for Gabrielle and marked her international breakthrough as an album-selling artist, entering the UK Albums Chart at number one, while also topping the UK R&B Albums Chart. It became her first and only UK chart-topping album and went on to achieve 4× Platinum certification in the United Kingdom, with certified sales of 1.2 million copies.

Internationally, Rise achieved success across Europe and selected overseas markets, though it did not match its UK performance. It peaked at number 4 in Denmark, number 6 in Ireland, number 7 in Norway, number 9 in New Zealand, number 17 in Austria, number 19 in Germany, number 19 in Switzerland, and number 23 in the Netherlands, while reaching number 116 in Australia. The album also received Gold certifications in Germany and Switzerland and Platinum status in New Zealand, alongside broader European sales exceeding one million copies.

== Track listing ==
Rise – Standard edition
No.	Title	Writer(s)	Producer(s)	Length
1.	"Sunshine"	Gabrielle; Jonathan Shorten	Shorten; Richie Fermie (co.)	4:10
2.	"Rise"	Gabrielle; Ollie Dagois; Bob Dylan; Ferdy Unger-Hamilton	Jonny Dollar; Simon Richmond	3:39
3.	"When a Woman"	Gabrielle; Julian Gallagher; Richard Stannard	Gallagher; Stannard	3:11
4.	"Tell Me What You Dream"	Gabrielle; Gallagher; Stannard	Gallagher; Stannard	4:03
5.	"5 O'Clock"	Gabrielle; Dagois; Unger-Hamilton	Dagois; Unger-Hamilton	3:36
6.	"Should I Stay"	Gabrielle; Jonathan Sharp	Dollar; Richmond	3:59
7.	"Over You"	Gabrielle; Shorten	Shorten; Fermie (co.)	4:21
8.	"Falling"	Gabrielle; Gallagher; Stannard	Gallagher; Stannard	3:21
9.	"If You Love Me"	Gabrielle; Shorten	Shorten	3:56
10.	"Independence Day"	Gabrielle; Sharp	Shorten; Fermie (co.)	4:35
11.	"Gonna Get Better"	Gabrielle; Shorten; Roger Drakes	Shorten	3:59

Rise – UK reissue bonus tracks
No.	Title	Writer(s)	Producer (s)	Length
12.	"Out of Reach"	Gabrielle; Shorten	Shorten	3:18
13.	"There's Nothing I Won't Do for You"	Gabrielle; The Boilerhouse Boys	Shorten	4:10
14.	"Rise" (acoustic version)	Gabrielle; Ollie Dagois; Bob Dylan; Ferdy Unger-Hamilton		3:55
15.	"Rise" (enhanced video)
16.	"Sunshine" (enhanced video)
17.	"When a Woman" (enhanced video)

Rise – Japan bonus tracks
No.	Title	Writer(s)	Producer(s)	Length
12.	"There's Nothing I Won't Do for You"	Gabrielle; The Boilerhouse Boys	Shorten; Fermie	4:10
13.	"Make You Wanna Holler"	Gabrielle; Ashley Beadle; Marc Woodford	Beadle; Woodford	4:44

== Rise Underground ==
Rise Underground

Remix album by Gabrielle
- Released: 27 November 2000
- Recorded: 1998–1999
- Genre: UK garage
- Length: 73:43
- Labels: Go Beat; Universal

Rise Underground – Remix edition
No.	Title	Writer(s)	Producer(s)	Length
1.	"Sunshine" (Wookie Dub Mix)	Gabrielle; Jonathan Shorten	Shorten; Richie Fermie^{[a]}; Wookie^{[b]}	4:26
2.	"Rise" (Artful Dodger Above Board Vox)	Gabrielle; Ollie Dagois; Bob Dylan; Ferdy Unger-Hamilton	Jonny Dollar; Simon Richmond; Artful Dodger^{[b]}	3:43
3.	"When a Woman" (Restless Natives Groove Mix)	Gabrielle; Julian Gallagher; Richard Stannard	Gallagher; Stannard; Restless Natives^{[b]}	3:57
4.	"5 O'clock" (Sunship Vocal Mix)	Gabrielle; Dagois; Unger-Hamilton	Dagois; Unger-Hamilton; Ceri Evans^{[b]}	3:44
5.	"Should I Stay" (K-Warren Dub)	Gabrielle; Jonathan Sharp	Dollar; Richmond; K-Warren^{[b]}	4:54
6.	"Over You" (Ed Case & Carl H Dub)	Gabrielle; Shorten	Shorten; Fermie^{[a]}; Zed Bias^{[b]}; Dave Jones^{[b]}	4:00
7.	"Independence Day" (Ed Case & Carl H Dub)	Gabrielle; Sharp	Shorten; Fermie^{[a]}; Carl H; Ed Case^{[b]}	3:01
8.	"Independence Day" (Ed Case & Carl H Remix)	Gabrielle; Sharp	Shorten; Fermie^{[a]}; Carl H; Ed Case^{[b]}	3:29
9.	"When a Woman" (Restless Natives Dub Mix)	Gabrielle; Julian Gallagher; Richard Stannard	Gallagher; Stannard; Restless Natives^{[b]}	1:55
10.	"If You Love Me" (Bump and Flex Dub Mix)	Gabrielle; Shorten	Shorten; Bump & Flex^{[b]}	4:28
11.	"Gonna Get Better" (D.E.A. Vocal)	Gabrielle; Shorten; Roger Drakes	Shorten; D.E.A. Project^{[b]}; DJ Para^{[b]}; Lloyd-E^{[b]}; R. Lally^{[b]}	4:03
12.	"Over You" (Zed Bias Dub)	Gabrielle; Shorten	Shorten; Fermie^{[a]}; Bias^{[b]}; Jones^{[b]}	4:21
13.	"If You Love Me" (Bump and Flex Vocal Mix)	Gabrielle; Shorten	Shorten; Bump & Flex^{[b]}	4:11
14.	"Tell Me What You Dream" (M Dubs Vocal Mix)	Gabrielle; Gallagher; Stannard	Gallagher; Stannard; Dennis MDubs^{[b]}	5:07
15.	"Sunshine" (Wookie Main Mix)	Gabrielle; Jonathan Shorten	Shorten; Richie Fermie^{[a]}; Wookie^{[b]}	4:26
16.	"5 O'clock" (Architechs Mix)	Gabrielle; Dagois; Unger-Hamilton	Dagois; Unger-Hamilton; Architechs^{[b]}	4:39
17.	"Falling" (Stanton Warriors Remix)	Gabrielle; Gallagher; Stannard	Gallagher; Stannard; Stanton Warriors^{[b]}	4:53
18.	"Gonna Get Better" (D.E.A. Dub)	Gabrielle; Shorten; Roger Drakes	Shorten; D.E.A. Project^{[b]}; DJ Para^{[b]}; Lloyd-E^{[b]}; R. Lally^{[b]}	4:36

Notes

- ^{^[a]} signifies a co-producer
- ^{^[b]} signifies an additional producer

== Charts ==
=== Weekly charts ===
Weekly chart performance for Rise
Chart (1999–2000)	Peak position
Australian Albums (ARIA)	116
Austrian Albums (Ö3 Austria)	17
Danish Albums (Hitlisten)	4
Dutch Albums (Album Top 100)	23
European Albums (Music & Media)	13
German Albums (Offizielle Top 100)	19
Irish Albums (IRMA)	6
New Zealand Albums (RMNZ)	9
Norwegian Albums (VG-lista)	7
Scottish Albums (Official Charts)	1
Swiss Albums (Schweizer Hitparade)	19
UK Albums (Official Charts)	1
UK R&B Albums (Official Charts)	1

=== Year-end charts ===
2000 year-end chart performance for Rise
Chart (2000)	Position
Danish Albums (Hitlisten)	68
European Albums (Music & Media)	30
German Albums (Offizielle Top 100)	67
New Zealand Albums (RMNZ)	47
Swiss Albums (Schweizer Hitparade)	56
UK Albums (OCC)	15

2001 year-end chart performance for Rise
Chart (2001)	Position
UK Albums (OCC)	39

== Certifications ==
Certifications of Rise, with sales where available
Region	Certification	Certified units/sales
Denmark	—	19,168
Germany (BVMI)	Gold	150,000^{^}
New Zealand (RMNZ)	Platinum	15,000^{^}
Switzerland (IFPI Switzerland)	Gold	25,000^{^}
United Kingdom (BPI)	4× Platinum	1,200,000
Summaries
Europe (IFPI)	Platinum	1,000,000^{*}
^{*} Sales figures based on certification alone.^{^} Shipments figures based on certification alone.
