= Bridget Jones's Diary: Music from the Motion Picture =

2001 soundtrack album

Soundtrack album by Various artists
- Released: 16 April 2001
- Length: 59:54
- Label: Mercury
- Producer: Nick Angel

Singles from Bridget Jones's Diary: Music from the Motion Picture
- 1. "Out of Reach" Released: 9 April 2001; 2. "It's Raining Men" Released: 30 April 2001

Bridget Jones's Diary: Music from the Motion Picture is the soundtrack album to the 2001 film Bridget Jones's Diary, directed by Sharon Maguire. It was released on 16 April 2001 by Mercury Records. The album features two hit songs that were released as singles, "Out of Reach" by Gabrielle and "It's Raining Men" by Geri Halliwell. Bridget Jones's Diary was nominated for the 2002 Grammy Award for Best Compilation Soundtrack for Visual Media. Following the success of the compilation, a second soundtrack was released, titled Bridget Jones's Diary 2: More Music from the Motion Picture and Other V.G. Songs.

== Promotion ==
"Out of Reach" by English singer Gabrielle was released as the soundtrack's lead single on 9 April 2001. It peaked at number one in Portugal, number two in New Zealand, and number four on the UK Singles Chart, also reaching the top ten in several other countries. The tenth-most-successful single of 2001 in New Zealand, it had sold 645,000 copies by March 2021, according to the Official Charts Company (OCC).

"It's Raining Men," a cover of the 1982 The Weather Girls song by former Spice Girls member Geri Halliwell, was released on 30 April 2001. Halliwell's version received positive reviews by music critics and experienced international success. In the United Kingdom, the song debuted at number-one on the UK Singles Chart and stayed there for two weeks. It became Halliwell's fourth consecutive number-one single in the UK, selling 155,000 units in its first week. Overall the single went on to sell 440,000 copies in Britain alone, becoming the 13th best seller of 2001. In France, it was certified Diamond by the Syndicat National de l'Édition Phonographique (SNEP).

== Critical reception ==
Professional ratings
Review scores
Source	Rating
AllMusic	3/5 stars

AllMusic editor Brad Kohlenstein noted that the "soundtrack assembles a cavalry of strong female artists." He found that "despite several edgy performers, the collection has an easy listening feel. It lacks the feel-good hits common to successful soundtracks and may have been well served to trade in some of the sentiment for a little more fun. However, each selection feels right for the film. The album is nostalgic while still in vogue, full of both kitsch and ardor, just like any romantic comedy should be." Rainer Henze from laut.de rated the album three out of five stars and called it "music for Sunday afternoons and black-and-white flick. Subtly unobtrusive for the most part. An okay soundtrack to a nice movie to an excellent book, then." In a retrospective review, The Daily Tribune wrote: "The Bridget Jones's Diary OST is packed with nostalgic gems like Gabrielle's "Out of Reach" and Geri Halliwell's "It’s Raining Men." Listening to it instantly transports us back to the early 2000s, and we're not complaining."

== Chart performance ==
A major success, Bridget Jones's Diary reached number one of the albums charts in Australia, Austria, Denmark, the Netherlands, New Zealand, Norway, and Spain. It also topped the UK Compilation Chart and peaked within the top ten on the majority of all other charts it appeared on. On 6 July 2001, it was certified triple Platinum by the British Phonographic Industry (BPI).

== Track listing ==
Bridget Jones's Diary track listing
No.	Title	Writer(s)	Performer(s)	Length
1.	"Out of Reach"	Louise Bobb; Jonathan Shorten	Gabrielle	3:18
2.	"Respect"	Otis Redding	Aretha Franklin	2:22
3.	"It's Raining Men"	Paul Jabara; Paul Shaffer	Geri Halliwell	4:11
4.	"Have You Met Miss Jones?"	Lorenz Hart	Robbie Williams	2:30
5.	"I'm Every Woman"	Nickolas Ashford; Valerie Simpson	Chaka Khan	4:04
6.	"Don't Get Me Wrong" (UK special edition bonus track)	Chrissie Hynde	The Pretenders	3:49
7.	"Kiss That Girl"	Sheryl Crow	Sheryl Crow	3:13
8.	"Killin' Kind"	Shelby Lynne	Shelby Lynne	4:36
9.	"Someone Like You"	Van Morrison	Dina Carroll	3:22
10.	"Not of This Earth"	Robbie Williams; Guy Chambers	Robbie Williams	4:41
11.	"Can't Take My Eyes Off You" (UK special edition bonus track)	Bob Crewe; Bob Gaudio	Andy Williams	2:58
12.	"Love"	Rosey; Darryl Swann	Rosey	3:38
13.	"Stop, Look, Listen (To Your Heart)"	Thom Bell; Linda Creed	Diana Ross & Marvin Gaye	2:48
14.	"Dreamsome"	Shelby Lynne; Jay Joyce; Dorothy Overstreet	Shelby Lynne	4:12
15.	"It's Only a Diary"	Patrick Doyle	Patrick Doyle	4:24
16.	"Pretender Got My Heart"	Karen Poole; Shelly Poole; Martin; Hogarth	Alisha's Attic	4:06
17.	"All by Myself"	Eric Carmen; Sergei Rachmaninoff	Jamie O'Neal	4:35
18.	"Woman Trouble" (UK special edition bonus track)	Craig David; Peter Devereux; Craig Robbie Elkins; Mark Hill	Artful Dodger & Robbie Craig featuring Craig David	3:08
19.	"Ring Ring Ring"	Aaron Soul; Brisco; Jeilan	Aaron Soul	3:53
Total length:				59:54

== Charts ==
=== Weekly charts ===
Weekly chart performance for Bridget Jones's Diary: Music from the Motion Picture
Chart (2001–2002)	Peak position
Australian Albums (ARIA)	1
Austrian Albums (Ö3 Austria)	1
Belgian Albums (Ultratop Flanders)	5
Belgian Albums (Ultratop Wallonia)	5
Canadian Albums (Billboard)	13
Czech Albums (ČNS IFPI)	8
Danish Albums (Hitlisten)	1
Dutch Albums (Album Top 100)	1
European Albums (Music & Media)	3
Finnish Albums (Suomen virallinen lista)	11
French Albums (SNEP)	6
German Albums (Offizielle Top 100)	3
Hungarian Albums (MAHASZ)	3
New Zealand Albums (RMNZ)	1
Norwegian Albums (VG-lista)	1
Polish Albums (ZPAV)	2
Spanish Albums (AFYVE)	1
Swedish Albums (Sverigetopplistan)	3
Swiss Albums (Schweizer Hitparade)	8
UK Compilation Albums (Official Charts)	1
UK Soundtrack Albums (Official Charts)	4
US Billboard 200	36
US Soundtrack Albums (Billboard)	14

=== Year-end charts ===
Year-end chart performance for Bridget Jones's Diary: Music from the Motion Picture
Chart (2001)	Position
Australian Albums (ARIA)	11
Austrian Albums (Ö3 Austria)	26
Belgian Albums (Ultratop Flanders)	77
Canadian Albums (Nielsen SoundScan)	112
Danish Albums (Hitlisten)	17
Dutch Albums (Album Top 100)	23
European Albums (Music & Media)	24
French Albums (SNEP)	88
German Albums (Offizielle Top 100)	47
Irish Albums (IRMA)	8
New Zealand Albums (RMNZ)	23
Spanish Albums (AFYVE)	14
Swedish Albums (Sverigetopplistan)	30
Swiss Albums (Schweizer Hitparade)	53
Worldwide Albums (IFPI)	30

== Certifications ==
Certifications for Bridget Jones's Diary: Music from the Motion Picture
Region	Certification	Certified units/sales
Australia (ARIA)	2× Platinum	140,000^{^}
Brazil (Pro-Música Brasil)	Gold	50,000^{*}
Canada (Music Canada)	Gold	50,000^{^}
Denmark (IFPI Danmark)	Gold	25,000^{^}
France (SNEP)	Gold	100,000^{*}
Netherlands (NVPI)	Gold	40,000^{^}
New Zealand (RMNZ)	Gold	7,500^{^}
Poland (ZPAV)	Gold	50,000^{*}
Spain (Promusicae)	Platinum	100,000^{^}
Sweden (GLF)	Gold	40,000^{^}
Switzerland (IFPI Switzerland)	Gold	20,000^{^}
United Kingdom (BPI)	3× Platinum	900,000^{^}
Summaries
Europe (IFPI)	2× Platinum	2,000,000^{*}
^{*} Sales figures based on certification alone.^{^} Shipments figures based on certification alone.

== Sequel album ==
Bridget Jones's Diary 2: More Music from the Motion Picture and Other V.G. Songs

Soundtrack album by Various artists
- Released: 29 October 2001
- Length: 72:53
- Label: Mercury
- Producer: Dave Allen

=== Track listing ===
Bridget Jones's Diary 2 track listing
No.	Title	Writer(s)	Performer(s)	Length
1.	"Me and Mrs. Jones"	Kenny Gamble; Leon Huff; Cary Gilbert	The Dramatics	3:58
2.	"Someone Like You"	Van Morrison	Van Morrison	4:05
3.	"My Lovin' (You're Never Gonna Get It)"	Denzil Foster; Thomas McElroy; James Brown; Fred Wesley; John Starks	En Vogue	4:41
4.	"My Funny Valentine"	Richard Rodgers; Lorenz Hart	Elvis Costello	4:12
5.	"Ain't No Mountain High Enough"	Nickolas Ashford; Valerie Simpson	Diana Ross	3:31
6.	"Yes"	David McAlmont; Bernard Butler	McAlmont and Butler	4:30
7.	"Woman"	Neneh Cherry; Cameron McVey; Jonathan Sharp	Neneh Cherry	4:27
8.	"Without You"	Pete Ham; Tom Evans	Nilsson	3:19
9.	"Do What You Gotta Do"	Jimmy Webb	Nina Simone	3:00
10.	"Say What You Want"	Johnny McElhone; Sharleen Spiteri	Texas	3:51
11.	"Don't Get Me Wrong"	Chrissie Hynde	The Pretenders	3:03
12.	"Out of Reach" (acoustic version)	Gabrielle Bobb; Jonathan Shorten	Gabrielle	3:49
13.	"Will You Love Me Tomorrow"	Carole King; Gerry Goffin	The Shirelles	2:41
14.	"Let's Get It On"	Marvin Gaye; Ed Townsend	Marvin Gaye	3:57
15.	"Waterfalls"	Marqueze Etheridge; Lisa Lopes; Organized Noize	TLC	3:33
16.	"Angels"	Robbie Williams; Guy Chambers	Robbie Williams	4:22
17.	"It Should Have Been Me"	William "Mickey" Stevenson; Norman Whitfield	Yvonne Fair	3:33
18.	"Ooo Baby Baby"	Smokey Robinson; Pete Moore	Smokey Robinson & The Miracles	2:45
19.	"I Don't Want to Talk About It"	Danny Whitten	Dina Carroll	5:27
20.	"Passionate Kisses"	Lucinda Williams	Mary Chapin Carpenter	5:36
Total length:				72:53

=== Charts ===
Weekly chart performance for Bridget Jones's Diary 2: More Music from the Motion Picture and Other V.G. Songs
Chart (2001)	Peak position
Austrian Albums (Ö3 Austria)	67
German Albums (Offizielle Top 100)	97
