= Rise (Gabrielle song) =

2000 single by Gabrielle

Single by Gabrielle

from the album Rise
- Released: 24 January 2000
- Genre: R&B
- Length: 3:41
- Label: Go! Beat
- Songwriters: Gabrielle; Ollie Dagois; Ferdy Unger-Hamilton; Bob Dylan
- Producer: Jonny Dollar

Gabrielle singles chronology
"Sunshine" (1999)	"Rise" (2000)	"When a Woman" (2000)

"Rise" is a song by English singer Gabrielle. It was written by Gabrielle, Ollie Dagois and Ferdy Unger-Hamilton and produced by Jonny Dollar for her same-titled third studio album (1999). Notable for a rare authorised use of a Bob Dylan sample, it takes extensively from his 1973 song "Knockin' on Heaven's Door". Dylan liked "Rise" so much he allowed Gabrielle to use the sample free, while receiving a co-writer credit for providing the song's chord progression and vocal sample.

Released as the second single from the album, the song reached number one on the UK Singles Chart for two weeks in January 2000, becoming her second chart-topper. "Rise" also reached number one in Ireland and charted highly in Austria, Iceland, Norway and New Zealand, where it reached number two in April and May 2000 and ended the year as the country's third-best-selling single.

== Music video ==
The music video for "Rise" features Gabrielle as a spectator viewing a boxing match. The video was directed by Kevin Godley and was shot in late 1999.

== Track listings ==
UK CD: 1
No.	Title	Length
1.	"Rise" (album version)	3:41
2.	"Rise" (Deep Dish Hi-Rise remix edit)	6:53
3.	"Rise" (Artful Dodger Above Board Vox mix)	5:01

UK CD: 2
No.	Title	Length
1.	"Rise" (album version)	3:41
2.	"Rise" (Mash Up Matt Darey remix)	8:36
3.	"Dreams" (original mix)	6:23

UK 12-inch single
No.	Title	Length
1.	"Rise" (Deep Dish Hi-Rise remix edit)	6:53
2.	"Rise" (Artful Dodger Legal dub mix)	5:04
3.	"Rise" (Mash Up Matt Darey remix)	8:36
4.	"Rise" (album version)	3:41

UK cassette single
No.	Title	Length
1.	"Rise" (album version)	3:41
2.	"Rise" (Deep Dish Hi-Rise radio edit)	3:59

European and Australian CD single
No.	Title	Length
1.	"Rise"	3:41
2.	"Dreams"	3:42
3.	"Give Me a Little More Time"	4:55

Germany maxi-CD single
No.	Title	Length
1.	"Rise"	3:41
2.	"Gonna Get Better"	4:01
3.	"Dreams"	3:42
4.	"Rise" (Terry Lee Brown Jr.'s vocal edit)	3:56
5.	"Rise" (Artful Dodger Legal dub mix)	5:04

US 12-inch single
No.	Title	Length
1.	"Rise" (Pop-Troneek extended remix)	8:40
2.	"Rise" (Pop-Troneek radio edit)	3:57
3.	"Rise" (Deep Dish Hi-Rise remix)	9:55
4.	"Rise" (album version)	3:41

== Credits and personnel ==
Credits are lifted from the Rise album booklet.

Studios

- Produced at Westside Studios (London, England)
- Mixed at Master Rock Studios (London, England)

Personnel

- Bob Dylan – writing ("Knockin' on Heaven's Door")
- Gabrielle – writing, vocals
- Ferdy Unger-Hamilton – writing
- Ollie Dagois – writing
- Sharon Scott – backing vocals
- Toyin Adekale – backing vocals
- Derrick Cross – backing vocals
- Doctor Gregory X – Hammond
- The London Session Orchestra – strings
- Jonny Dollar – all other instruments, production
- Simon Richmond – all other instruments, co-production
- Wil Malone – string arrangement
- Craig Silvey – mixing

== Charts ==
=== Weekly charts ===
Chart (1999–2000)	Peak position
Australia (ARIA)	76
Austria (Ö3 Austria Top 40)	5
Belgium (Ultratop 50 Flanders)	12
Belgium (Ultratop 50 Wallonia)	38
Czech Republic (IFPI)	13
Europe (Eurochart Hot 100)	8
Finland (Suomen virallinen lista)	17
France (SNEP)	35
Germany (GfK)	16
Hungary (Rádiós Top 40)	6
Iceland (Íslenski Listinn Topp 40)	12
Ireland (IRMA)	1
Netherlands (Dutch Top 40)	13
Netherlands (Single Top 100)	14
New Zealand (Recorded Music NZ)	2
Norway (VG-lista)	5
Poland Airplay (Music & Media)	3
Scottish Singles Sales (Official Charts)	2
Sweden (Sverigetopplistan)	24
Switzerland (Schweizer Hitparade)	11
UK Singles (Official Charts)	1
UK Hip Hop/R&B (Official Charts)	1
US Dance Club Songs (Billboard)	13

=== Year-end charts ===
Chart (2000)	Position
Belgium (Ultratop 50 Flanders)	72
Europe (Eurochart Hot 100)	37
Germany (Media Control)	98
Ireland (IRMA)	28
Netherlands (Dutch Top 40)	80
Netherlands (Single Top 100)	77
New Zealand (RIANZ)	3
Switzerland (Schweizer Hitparade)	56
UK Singles (OCC)	13

== Certifications ==
Region	Certification	Certified units/sales
New Zealand (RMNZ)	Gold	5,000^{*}
United Kingdom (BPI)	Platinum	647,000
^{*} Sales figures based on certification alone.

== Release history ==
Region	Date	Format(s)	Label(s)	Ref(s).
United Kingdom	24 January 2000	CD; cassette	Go! Beat	
United States	11 July 2000	Rhythmic contemporary; contemporary hit radio	Universal	
