= Wheatus discography =

- Studio albums: 5
- EPs: 2
- Live albums: 2
- Singles: 8
- Music videos: 15

American rock band Wheatus has released five studio albums, two EPs and eight singles.

== Albums ==
=== Studio albums ===
List of studio albums, with selected details, chart positions and certifications
Title	Details	Peak chart positions								Certifications (sales threshold)
Title	Details	US	AUS	AUT	NL	NZ	SWE	SWI	UK	Certifications (sales threshold)
Wheatus	Released: August 15, 2000; Label: Columbia (CK 62146); Format: CD, CS, DL	76	55	7	96	48	44	22	7	BPI: Platinum; RMNZ: Platinum
Hand Over Your Loved Ones (Note: Hand Over Your Loved Ones was re-released under the name Suck Fony after Wheatus left Columbia Records)	Released: September 8, 2003; Label: Columbia (COL 509846); Format: CD, DL	—	—	—	—	—	—	—	—	
Too Soon Monsoon	Released: October 18, 2005; Label: Montauk Mantis (MMR CD002); Format: CD, DL	—	—	—	—	—	—	—	—	
Pop, Songs & Death	Released: November 13, 2012; Label: Blacktop, Montauk Mantis (BTR022); Format: CD, DL, LP	—	—	—	—	—	—	—	—	
The Valentine LP	Released: August 2, 2013; Label: Blacktop, Montauk Mantis (BTR039); Format: CD, CS, DL, LP	—	—	—	—	—	—	—	—	
"—" denotes releases that did not chart or were not released in that territory.

=== Re-recordings ===
List of re-recorded studio albums, with selected details
Title	Details
Wheatus 2020	Released: December 1, 2023; Label: Montauk Mantis; Format: DL, LP

=== Live albums ===
List of live albums
Title	Details
Live 2015	Release date: April 28, 2016; Label: Montauk Mantis; Format: DL
Wheatus M (Live in America)	Release date: April 10, 2020; Label: Format:

== EPs ==
List of extended plays
Title	Details
Lemonade	Release date: June 28, 2004; Label: Montauk Mantis; Format: DL
Live at XM	Release date: December 14, 2004; Label: Montauk Mantis; Format: DL
Just a Dirtbag Christmas	Release date: October 13, 2023; Label: Sony Music, Montauk Mantis; Label: DL, streaming

== Singles ==
List of singles, with selected chart positions and certifications
Year	Title	Peak chart positions										Certifications (sales threshold)	Album
Year	Title	US Bub.	AUS	AUT	BEL	GER	IRE	ITA	NZ	SWI	UK	Certifications (sales threshold)	Album
2000	"Teenage Dirtbag"	24	1	1	1	2	2	38	27	3	2	ARIA: 3× Platinum; BPI: 5× Platinum; BVMI: 3× Gold; GLF: Gold; IFPI AUT: Platinum; IFPI SWI: Gold; RMNZ: 5× Platinum	Wheatus
2001	"A Little Respect"	—	—	19	44	32	5	28	41	84	3	BPI: Silver	Wheatus
2001	"Leroy"	—	47	—	—	—	—	—	—	—	—		Wheatus
2002	"Wannabe Gangstar"	—	—	—	—	—	43	—	—	—	22		Wheatus
2003	"American in Amsterdam"	—	—	—	—	—	—	—	—	—	59		Hand Over Your Loved Ones
2005	"The Story of William McGovern" (Note: "The Story of William McGovern" was featured on the reissue of the "Hand Over Your Loved Ones" album, which was released under the name "Suck Fony".)	—	—	—	—	—	—	—	—	—	—		Hand Over Your Loved Ones
2005	"BMX Bandits"	—	—	—	—	—	—	—	—	—	— (Note: "BMX Bandits" did not enter the UK Singles Chart, but peaked at number 44 on the UK Independent Singles Chart.)		Too Soon Monsoon
2006	"The London Sun"	—	—	—	—	—	—	—	—	—	—		Too Soon Monsoon
2011	"The Story of the Eggs"	—	—	—	—	—	—	—	—	—	—		Pop, Songs & Death: Vol. 2 — The Jupiter EP
2012	"Lemonade"	—	—	—	—	—	—	—	—	—	—		Hand Over Your Loved Ones
2014	"Only You" (featuring Josh Devine and Sandy Beales)	—	—	—	—	—	—	—	—	—	—		The Valentine LP
2014	"Holiday"	—	—	—	—	—	—	—	—	—	—		The Valentine LP
2016	"Tipsy"	—	—	—	—	—	—	—	—	—	—		Non-album singles
2018	"Lullaby"	—	—	—	—	—	—	—	—	—	—		Non-album singles
2020	"Mope"	—	—	—	—	—	—	—	—	—	—		Wheatus 2020
2020	"Spyder Nate Webb Is Cookin for You"	—	—	—	—	—	—	—	—	—	—		Non-album single
2021	"Through"	—	—	—	—	—	—	—	—	—	—		Wheatus 2020
2021	"Temporary Song"	—	—	—	—	—	—	—	—	—	—		Wheatus 2020
2021	"F.B.S.M."	—	—	—	—	—	—	—	—	—	—		Wheatus 2020
2022	"People"	—	—	—	—	—	—	—	—	—	—		Wheatus 2020
2022	"Mullet"	—	—	—	—	—	—	—	—	—	—		Wheatus 2020
2022	"Satan's Orders"	—	—	—	—	—	—	—	—	—	—		Wheatus 2020
2022	"Semolina"	—	—	—	—	—	—	—	—	—	—		Wheatus 2020
2023	"Starstruck"	—	—	—	—	—	—	—	—	—	—		Non-album single
2023	"Dead Again"	—	—	—	—	—	—	—	—	—	—		Wheatus 2020
2023	"Dark Day"	—	—	—	—	—	—	—	—	—	—		Wheatus 2020
2026	"Analog Summer"	—	—	—	—	—	—	—	—	—	—		Non-album single
"—" denotes releases that did not chart

== Music videos ==
Year	Video	Director
2000	"Teenage Dirtbag"	Jeff Gordon
2001	"A Little Respect"	The Malloys
2002	"Wannabe Gangster"	Jeff Gordon
2002	"Leroy"	Mark Hartley
2003	"American in Amsterdam"	Mat Kirkby
2005	"BMX Bandits"	Stuart MacKay-Smith
2006	"The London Sun"	Brendan B. Brown
2006	"Something Good"	Brendan B. Brown
2008	"Change The World (Black Precedent)" (Wheatus x MC Lars)	Matthew Milligan
2008	"Real Girl"	Brendan B. Brown
2011	"The Story of the Eggs"	Antony Lane
2011	"Invasion of the Not Quite Dead" (MC Frontalot featuring Wheatus)	Antony Lane
2012	"Lemonade" (The Lego Videos #1)	Oliver Broadbent
2014	"Only You" (The Lego Videos #2)	Oliver Broadbent
2014	"Holiday" (The Lego Videos #3)	Oliver Broadbent
2016	"Break It Don't Buy It" (Live from Glasgow)	Ian Vaughan Jones
2017	"Tipsy" (2017 Tour Video)	Crazy D. Lane
