= Danielle Taylor =

Danielle Taylor may refer to:

- Danielle Taylor (fighter) (born 1989), American mixed martial artist
- Danielle Taylor (footballer) (born 1984), New Zealand football player
- Danielle Taylor (musician), American singer-songwriter
