= Fragile – Handle with Care =

Studio album by Cristy Lane
- Released: September 1981
- Recorded: June 1981
- Studio: Woodland (Nashville, Tennessee)
- Genre: Country; country pop
- Label: Liberty; LS
- Producer: Don Grierson; Bob Jenkins; Ron Oates; Lee Stoller

Cristy Lane chronology
I Have a Dream (1981)	Fragile – Handle with Care (1981)	One Day at a Time (1981)

Singles from Fragile – Handle with Care
- 1. "Cheatin' Is Still on My Mind" Released: August 1981; 2. "Lies on Your Lips" Released: December 1981; 3. "Fragile – Handle with Care" Released: April 1982

Fragile – Handle with Care is a studio album by American Christian and country singer Cristy Lane. It was released in September 1981 via Liberty and LS Records and contained 11 tracks. It was the seventh studio album of Lane's music career and second to be issued on the Liberty label. Three singles were spawned from the project, including "Cheatin' Is Still on My Mind" and "Lies on Your Lips". Both songs made the top 40 on the American country chart.

== Background and content ==
Cristy Lane first had commercial success in country music during the late 1970s with songs like "Let Me Down Easy" and "I Just Can't Stay Married to You". In 1980, she had the biggest hit single of her career with the Christian song One Day at a Time". The song became a number one hit. Before transitioning completely into the Christian market, she continued recording country-pop material for the next several years while at Liberty Records.

Her next studio album, Fragile – Handle with Care was recorded in a similar country-pop style. It contained a total of 11 tracks. Included were covers of Hot's "Angel in Your Arms", Connie Smith's "Once a Day" and The Four Preps' "Love of the Common People". A re-recorded version of "One Day at a Time" is also featured. The project was recorded in June 1981 at the Woodland Sound Studios, located in Nashville, Tennessee. The sessions were mostly produced by Ron Oates and Bob Jenkins, with executive production credits being given to Don Grierson and Lee Stoller (Lane's husband and manager).

== Release and chart performance ==
Fragile – Handle with Care was released in September 1981 on Liberty Records and LS Records. It was Lane's second studio release with the label and the seventh of her recording career. The album was originally distributed as a vinyl LP and a cassette. The album was her fourth to reach the Billboard Top Country Albums chart, peaking at number 43 in 1981. Three singles were spawned that became charting singles. In August 1981, "Cheatin' Is Still on My Mind" was issued as the record's first single. The song became a top 40 hit after it reached number 38 on the Billboard Hot Country Songs chart. It was followed by "Lies on Your Lips", which was issued as a single in December 1981. The song peaked at number 22 on the Billboard country songs chart in 1981. The title track was issued as the project's final single in April 1982 and reached number 52 on the Billboard country chart.

== Track listing ==
Side one (vinyl and cassette versions)
No.	Title	Writer(s)	Length
1.	"Fragile – Handle with Care"	Don Huber; Rick Kelly	3:19
2.	"The Angel in Your Arms"	Tom Brasfield; Herbert Clayton Ivey; Terrence Woodford	3:15
3.	"Midnight Blue"	Melissa Manchester; Carole Bayer Sager	3:35
4.	"Lies on Your Lips"	Jim Dowell; Larry Shell	2:16
5.	"I've Really Got the Blues"	Robert Jenkins	2:56

Side two (vinyl and cassette versions)
No.	Title	Writer(s)	Length
1.	"Cheatin' Is Still on My Mind"	Jenkins	2:34
2.	"Once a Day"	Bill Anderson	2:27
3.	"Too Soon to Know"	Don Gibson	3:28
4.	"Tangerine"	Frank Casuer; Jim Foster; Chapin Hartford	3:05
5.	"Love of the Common People"	John Hurley and Ronnie Wilkins	3:30
6.	"One Day at a Time"	Kris Kristofferson; Marijohn Wilkin	3:29

== Personnel ==
All credits are adapted from the liner notes of Fragile – Handle with Care.

Musical personnel

- Eddie Bayers – Drums
- Jerry Carrigan – Drums
- Doug Clements – Background vocals
- Larry Byrom – Guitar
- Ray Edenton – Acoustic guitar
- Mary Fielder – Background vocals
- Jim Glaser – Background vocals
- Lloyd Green – Steel guitar
- Leo Jackson – Guitar
- Sheri Kramer – Background vocals
- The Shelly Kurland Strings – Strings
- Cristy Lane – Lead vocals
- Linda Lange – Background vocals
- Patti Leatherwood – Background vocals
- Anne Marie – Background vocals
- Donna McElroy – Background vocals
- Farrell Morris – Percussion
- Roger Morris – Keyboards
- Ron Oates – Keyboards
- Jack Ross – Bass
- Steve Schaeffer – Bass
- Dale Sellers – Guitar
- Donna Sherridan – Background vocals
- Muscle Shoals Horns – Horn
- Lisa Silver – Background vocals
- John Stacy – Drums
- James Stroud – Drums
- Bobby Taylor – Horn
- Diane Tidwell – Background vocals
- Pete Wade – Acoustic guitar
- Bergan White – Background vocals
- Bob Wray – Bass
- Reggie Young – Acoustic guitar

Technical personnel

- Bob Jenkins – Producer
- Don Grierson – Executive producer
- Steve Ham – Engineering
- Les Ladid – Engineering
- Mike Leech – Arrangement
- Ron Oates – Producer, arrangement
- Lee Stoller – Executive producer, manager

== Charts ==
Chart (1981)	Peak position
US Top Country Albums (Billboard)	43

== Release history ==
Region	Date	Format	Label	Ref.
United States	September 1981	Cassette; Vinyl	LS Records; Liberty Records	
