= Yclept =

Yclept is an archaic English word meaning "by the name of".

Example: “A man yclept John”

Yclept may also refer to

- Yclept, album by the band Dome
- Yclept, the first band of musician Chris Jay
- Yclept Yarbro, a newsletter by the writer Chelsea Quinn Yarbro
