= Live at XM =

EP by Wheatus
- Released: 15 December 2004
- Recorded: 2004
- Genre: Rock
- Length: 23:40
- Label: Montauk Mantis
- Producer: Brendan B. Brown

Wheatus chronology
Lemonade (2004)	Live at XM (2004)	Too Soon Monsoon (2005)

Live at XM is an EP by Wheatus released on 15 December 2004 and exclusively available at Apple's iTunes Store. It features five songs from a live performance that was part of an hour-long Wheatus special, broadcast by XM Satellite Radio. The song 'Lemonade' on the EP was dedicated to Brendan B. Brown's neighbors.

The EP was removed from iTunes at an unknown date, and is not otherwise available.

== Track listing ==
1. "The Deck" (Live) – 4:31
2. "Anyway" (Live) – 5:33
3. "Hey, Mr. Brown" (Live) – 3:09
4. "Teenage Dirtbag" (Live) – 6:01
5. "Lemonade" (Live) – 4:26
