= Fony =

Fony may refer to:

- Fony, Hungary, a small village in Hungary
- Suck Fony, a 2005 album by Wheatus
- Fony, a record label founded by composer John Oswald
