= Cheatin' Is Still on My Mind =

"Cheatin' I Still on My Mind"

Single by Cristy Lane

from the album Fragile – Handle with Care
- B-side: "Just a Mile from Nowhere"
- Released: August 1981
- Recorded: June 1981
- Studio: Woodland (Nashville, Tennessee)
- Genre: Country; country pop
- Length: 2:34
- Label: Liberty
- Songwriter: Robert Jenkins
- Producers: Don Grierson; Bob Jenkins; Lee Stoller

Cristy Lane singles chronology
"Love to Love You" (1981)	"Cheatin' I Still on My Mind" (1981)	"Lies on Your Lips" (1981)

"Cheatin' Is Still on My Mind" is a song written by Robert Jenkins that was originally recorded by American Christian and country singer Cristy Lane. It was released as a single via Liberty Records in 1981 and it became a top 40 single on the American country music chart. It was also released on Lane's seventh studio album titled Fragile – Handle with Care.

== Background, recording and chart performance ==
By 1980, Cristy Lane had success as a country music singer with several top ten hits, along with the number one single "One Day at a Time". Lane recorded several singles in the years that followed for Liberty Records, including "Cheatin' Is Still on My Mind". The song was composed by Robert Jenkins. She recorded the track at the Woodland Studios, located in Nashville, Tennessee. Taking place in June 1981, the session was produced by Robert Jenkins (credited as "Bob Jenkins"), along with assistance from Don Grierson and Lane's husband (and manager) Lee Stoller.

In August 1981, "Cheatin' Is Still on My Mind" was issued as a single, on the Liberty label. It was Lane's third single release with Liberty. The song became her second single since 1977 to miss the top 20 on the Billboard Hot Country Songs chart, peaking at number 38 in 1981. The song also climbed to number 46 on the Canadian RPM Country Songs chart, becoming her final charting single there. Also in 1981, the song was issued on Lane's seventh studio album titled Fragile – Handle with Care.

== Track listing ==
7" vinyl single

- "Cheatin' Is Still on My Mind" – 2:34
- "Just a Mile from Nowhere" – 3:15

== Charts ==
Chart (1981)	Peak position
Canada Country Songs (RPM)	46
US Hot Country Singles (Billboard)	38
