= Danielle Taylor (musician) =

American singer-songwriter

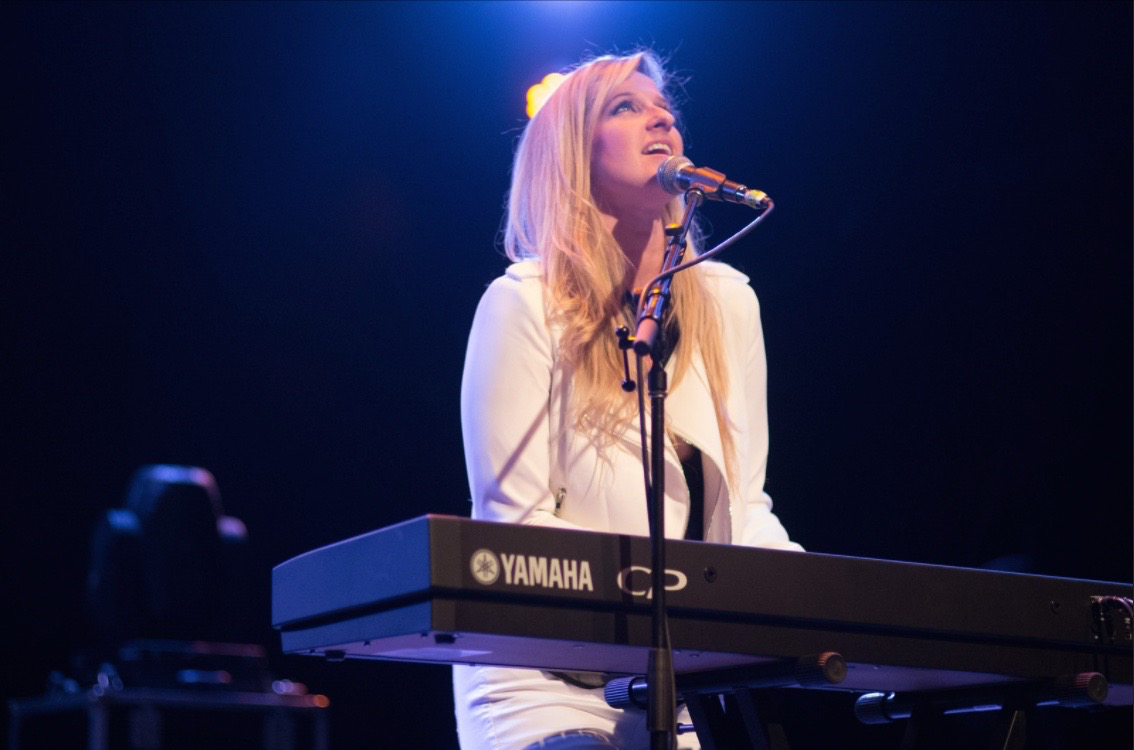
- Taylor at the Saban Theater

Background information
- Born: San Diego, California, United States
- Occupations: Musician, singer-songwriter
- Instruments: Vocals, piano
- Years active: 2008–present
- Labels: SonyRED
- Website: danielletaylormusic.com

Danielle Taylor is an American singer-songwriter who has recorded two EPs (Don't Turn On The Light and The Chase) and one solo album titled, 1440. She has worked with former SVP of Epic Records, Don Grierson and has recorded with Grammy winner, Erich Talaba. Her second AC/pop record, "The Chase", was released through SonyRED on March 31, 2015, and was signed to several licensing deals including (TLC, OWN, E!TV, Oxygen, VH1, Showtime, The Discovery Channel Network and MTV). Her most recent issue, 1440, was self released on August 6, 2016, and later added to SiriusXM in November that same year. Taylor currently lives in Riverside, California, and tours up and down the Pacific Coast year round, regularly serving as direct support to nationally recognized and award-winning artists.

== Early life ==
Danielle Taylor was born in San Diego, California and is the oldest of three daughters. Her parents encouraged her to learn music at an early age. By the time she was eight, Taylor was singing in the Fletcher Hills Elementary School choir and was taking lessons on the clarinet for classical performance. In 1995, Taylor's family moved from San Diego to Granada Hills, where she attended Patrick Henry Middle School. She joined the school band and was referred to College of the Canyons' Youth Philharmonic directed by Robert Lawson (her later professor and Music Department chair at Ventura College). Taylor then attended Granada Hills High School; joining the Highlander Band, with whom she later performed at the 2002 Paralympics.

The day following her high school graduation, Taylor left home due to rising tensions with her mother. Though she continued to pursue studies with the clarinet at California State University, Northridge and later Pierce Community College, she struggled to balance work and school and subsequently quit her full-time job. Struggling to make ends meet, she found herself unemployed and eventually homeless. Taylor lived in her car, struggling to find solid ground for five months. With no discernible direction, she moved North to Ventura, California and enrolled into the music program at Ventura Community College where she again encountered Robert Lawson. With Lawson's guidance, Taylor continued her efforts as a clarinetist – rejoining the College of the Canyon Philharmonic as first chair.

Over the next year, Taylor again failed to balance work and school and so, with only an Associates degree, she dropped out of college, dropping music along with it.

== Career ==
=== 2005–08: Career beginnings ===
Taylor floundered, working the occasional odd job until she connected with an employee at Silver Star Mercedes-Benz, who helped her secure employment in their internet department. It was in this unassuming job that Taylor would again find her passion for music. She began to lament about her desire to get back into it, only this time, as a singer. A co-worker knew a producer named Dennis Weber who agreed to meet with Taylor and chat about the music business and her possible place in it. Following this meeting, she decided to take up a new instrument and try her hand at songwriting.

She put a wanted advertisement on Craigslist and soon after was the owner of a 1901 Cable Company grand upright that she named Ella. Using the knowledge gained from her schooling as a clarinetist, Taylor taught herself the basics of piano, practicing for hours on end. Eventually, the loud sounds emanating from her thin apartment walls led her to an all too familiar homeless state. With her new piano in storage, along with the rest of her belongings, Taylor became more determined than ever to make something of herself. She continuously spoke of her passion for music, trying to connect with anyone who would listen.

In 2008, another co-worker put her in touch with the Senior Vice President of Sony/ATV Music Publishing, Kathleen Carey. Carey listened to Taylor's early demo and provided advice, encouragement and feedback. This encounter motivated Taylor to start performing her material in venues throughout both Ventura and Los Angeles counties. She performed at all the hotspots, joined ASCAP and attended their regular songwriter-mixers where she learned about TAXI.

=== 2011–13: Don't Turn on the Light ===
In 2011, Taylor met Chris Jay and Aaron Goldberg of the band, Army of Freshmen who agreed to produce her debut release, Don't Turn on the Light. In late 2012, Taylor performed for her first national audience as she opened for Jonny Lang. She then became a TAXI member, attended the yearly convention and met former Senior Vice President of Epic Records, Don Grierson who agreed to mentor her.

As she worked with Grierson to hone her songwriting skills, she continued to serve as direct support to several established artists.

To date she has opened for: Aaron Carter, Ari Hest, Colby O'Donis, David Cassidy, Dick Dale, John Ondrasik, Howie Day, Leon Russell, Lisa Loeb, Marc Broussard, Marc Cohn, Steve Tyrell, Wilson Phillips, Striking Matches, Jonny Lang, Kate Voegele, Tyler Hilton and Crystal Bowersox.

=== 2014–15: The Chase ===
In late 2014, Taylor connected with Grammy award-winning engineer and producer, Erich Talaba who produced her second EP, The Chase. Prior to its completion, Taylor caught the attention of SonyRED representative Garrett Clark. She signed a distribution deal in late 2014, released "Fearless", the first single off her record on December 31 and released the full EP on March 31, 2015.

=== 2016 – present: 1440 ===
In early 2016, Taylor recorded her first album, the 11 song, 1440. Taylor returned to Erich Talaba for production and the record was released in August 2016. In November 2016, Taylor signed a licensing deal with SiriusXM and several of her songs can be heard on SXM's 'strong vocalist' station, Velvet. Videos for "So What" and "RSVP" can be viewed on Taylor's YouTube or VEVO Channels.

== Discography ==
Year	Album	Information
2011	Don't Turn on the Light	Written by Danielle Taylor, Produced by Chris Jay and Aaron Goldberg of Army of Freshmen
2015	The Chase	Written by Danielle Taylor, Produced by Erich Talaba
2016	1440	Written by Danielle Taylor, Produced by Erich Talaba

== Accolades and nominations ==
- 2010 – Ventura County Star – Featured Article
- 2010 – Ventura County Reporter – Featured Article
- 2012 – Ventura County's Best Female Solo Artist – Nominated
- 2015 – 360 Magazine – Featured Article
- 2015 – Tersichore – Featured Review
- 2015 – Tilting Windmill Studios – Featured Review
- 2015 – DJ Jennder – Featured Review
- 2015 – Mark Weber Music Blog – Featured Review
- 2016 – Album/CD Release Review – Featured Article
- 2016 – The Young Folks Interview – Featured Article
