= Lies on Your Lips =

Single by Cristy Lane

from the album Fragile – Handle with Care
- B-side: "I've Really Got the Blues"
- Released: December 1981
- Recorded: June 1981
- Studio: Woodland (Nashville, Tennessee)
- Genre: Country; country pop
- Length: 2:16
- Label: Liberty
- Songwriter(s): James Dowell; Larry Shell
- Producer(s): Don Grierson; Ron Oates; Lee Stoller

Cristy Lane singles chronology
| "Cheatin' Is Still on My Mind" (1981) | "Lies on Your Lips" (1981) | "Fragile – Handle with Care" (1982) |

"Lies on Your Lips" is a song written by James Dowell and Larry Shell. It was originally recorded by American Christian and country singer Cristy Lane. It was released as a single via Liberty Records in 1981 and it became a top 40 single on the American country music chart. It was also released on Lane's seventh studio album titled Fragile – Handle with Care.

== Background, recording and chart performance ==
During the late 1970s and early 1980s, Cristy Lane had country music success with several top ten hits, along with the number one single "One Day at a Time". Lane recorded several singles in the years that followed for Liberty Records, including "Lies on Your Lips". The song was composed by James Dowell and Larry Shell. She recorded the track at the Woodland Sound Studios, located in Nashville, Tennessee. Taking place in June 1981, the session was produced by Ron Oates, along with assistance from Don Grierson and Lane's husband (and manager) Lee Stoller.

"Lies on Your Lips" was first released on Lane's seventh studio album titled Fragile – Handle with Care. In December 1981, "Lies on Your Lips" was issued as a single, on the Liberty label. It was Lane's fourth single release with Liberty. The song became her third single since 1977 to miss the top 20 on the Billboard Hot Country Songs chart, peaking at number 22 in 1982. It was Lane's final single to reach the top 40 on the chart. The song was reviewed by Billboard magazine in 1981. "Powerful tracks behind Lane add a welcome punch to her performance and provide effective contrast to her soft-spoken vocal," they wrote.

== Track listing ==
7" vinyl single

- "Lies on Your Lips" – 2:16
- "I've Really Got the Blues" – 2:58

== Charts ==
| Chart (1981–82) | Peak position |
|---|---|
| US Hot Country Singles (Billboard) | 22 |
