= BMX Bandits =

BMX Bandits may refer to:

- BMX Bandits (band), a Glaswegian guitar pop band
- BMX Bandits (film), a 1983 Australian children's movie featuring Nicole Kidman
- "BMX Bandits", a 2005 song from Wheatus' album TooSoonMonsoon which alludes to the film
