= Kevin Interdonato =

American actor

Kevin Interdonato (b. April 5, 1979) is an American actor. He began his career on the East Coast, an Actor known for his work on the rising Indie film scene in NYC, Philadelphia and NJ. From 2001, his Television roles on The Sopranos, Law And Order, CSI:NY, and being nationwide finalist in Producer Joel Silver's "Next Action Star", only added to his resume of Acting in many Award-Winning Independent Films. He is of Italian descent.

Interdonato attended Howell High School and Brookdale Community College.

An abrupt leave from the business to fulfill his military obligations led Kevin to a tour of duty in Baghdad, Iraq in 2004–05. Upon his return, Kevin eased back into film after contemplating his leave from the business. His work thereafter in the following years on the Indie Film scene led to being honored at the 2008 Garden State Film Festival, where he was awarded the "Robert Pastorelli Rising Star Award".

Kevin's continued work in Dramatic and Comedic roles garnered him recognition at numerous Film Festivals throughout the U.S., and was highlighted in IFQ magazine as "The New Badass of Indie Film" for his portrayal of Nazo in the award-winning feature film Blue Collar Boys.

Currently, Kevin is Acting, Writing, Producing and Directing several projects, including upcoming TV Series' Dirty Dead Con Men', and the feature film, Bad Frank which hit the film festival circuit in 2017. He is starring alongside Kevin Bacon in the Showtime series City on a Hill.
