= Bad Frank =

- Directed by: Tony Germinario
- Written by: Tony Germinario
- Starring: Kevin Interdonato; Amanda Clayton; Tom Sizemore
- Cinematography: Mike Hechanova
- Release date: 2017
- Running time: 103 minutes
- Country: United States
- Language: English
- Budget: $80,000

Bad Frank is a 2017 independent action film written and directed by Tony Germinario. It stars Kevin Interdonato, Amanda Clayton and Tom Sizemore.

== Plot ==
After having sex with his wife, seemingly nice guy Frank is having trouble because he's out of his meds. In the meantime, his friend Travis (Brandon Heitkamp) asks him if he'll ride along as backup while he does a job. Frank is reluctant, but agrees ("This is the last time!"). Meeting up with two other men, Mickey (Tom Sizemore) and Niko (Russ Russo), we find out Frank and Mickey have a history. Two other men show up, and we find out it's a drug buy. After some racist banter, Mickey and Niko shoot both men and steal the drugs.

Frank is fighting with his wife, Gina (Amanda Clayton), because of stress over witnessing the shootings and because he still can't get his meds. He meets Travis in a bar and tells him he is going to the police. After returning home, he finds Niko is already there, on the back porch talking to his wife. Frank flips out and tells his wife not to talk to strangers. Pissed, Gina takes the truck and goes to visit her friend, Travis' wife. Once there, Niko shows up again, and with Frank on the phone, Niko abducts her.

Frank goes to his father, Charlie (Ray "Boom-Boom" Mancini), a retired police officer, and asks him for help. They are estranged, because Frank has a history with alcohol, drugs, and violence. When Charlie refuses to help, Frank attacks the bouncer and beats him. Now we begin to find out about "Bad Frank." Frank begins drinking, and we learn through several different voices that Frank used to be some kind of enforcer for Mickey.

In order to force Mickey to give him back his abducted wife, Frank abducts Mickey's daughter Crystal (Lynn Mancinelli). After a phone call to Mickey, Frank and Crystal get drunk, and we find out more about Frank's association with Mickey. Mickey meanwhile has taken Travis prisoner, and shows him a cellphone video of Travis having sex with Gina. Mickey threatens to tell Frank that Travis has had sex with his wife, and reveals more of Bad Frank's past.

Finally Frank and Mickey meet up to exchange hostages. Frank has seen the video, and tells Mickey that he has taken everything from him. He breaks Crystal's neck; Travis bumps Mickey so that Mickey has to shoot Travis first, which gives Frank time to get to Mickey. Frank beats Mickey to death, then, covered in blood, tells Gina he wants to try to start over. The film ends with Frank driving off with Gina crying, still tied up in the back of his truck.

== Cast ==
- Kevin Interdonato as Frank "Bad Frank", an ex-enforcer.
- Amanda Clayton as Gina, Frank's wife, who does not know about Frank's past.
- Tom Sizemore as Mickey Duro, Frank's former employer in crime.
- Brandon Heitkamp as Travis, Frank's friend, who also does not really know about Frank's past.
- Russ Russo as Niko, Mickey's current enforcer.
- Ray Mancini as Charlie, Frank's father and retired heavy-handed police officer.
- Lynn Mancinelli as Crystal Duro, Mickey's daughter.

== Production ==
Bad Frank was reportedly shot for $80,000. The film was shot around Mendham.

== Reception ==
Morbidly Beautiful writes, "In many respects, Bad Frank is a 'perfect storm,' in which the hard work of all of the production staff and the actors combine to create a tense and entertaining thrill ride that will have you biting your nails in anticipation of what will happen in the next scene." Courtney Button of Starburts, although not finding the film original nor subtle, especially in the end, stated: 'With strong performances and some solid direction, Bad Frank is enjoyable and compelling through its first half but starts to fall apart in the final act. " A review at Jo Blo recommendet the films to viewers who are "into retro-killer-kidnap comeuppance".
