= The Bet (2016 film) =

- Theatrical poster
- Directed by: Ryan Ederer
- Written by: Chris Jay; Aaron Goldberg
- Produced by: Reza Riazi; Chris Jay; Aaron Goldberg
- Starring: Alex Klein; Amanda Clayton; Brian Allen; Michael Consiglio; Yassir Lester; Jeremiah Watkins; Paul Natonek; Stacey Kaney; Nikki Leigh; Katie Hilliard; Dallas Page; Jake Roberts; Gerry Bednob; Tommy Dreamer; Roddy Piper
- Cinematography: John Schmidt
- Edited by: Taylor Smith
- Music by: Michael J. Leslie
- Production companies: Balding Penguin; Goldy Jay Productions
- Distributed by: Screen Media Films
- Release date: July 2016
- Running time: 78 minutes
- Country: United States
- Language: English

The Bet is a 2016 American comedy film directed by Ryan Ederer and written by Chris Jay and Aaron Goldberg. The film features appearances from several professional wrestlers and is also the final film of Roddy Piper.

== Plot ==
A loser in life and love, Denton Baker gets into a high stakes bet where he has one summer to find, and hook up with, every girl he had a crush on from 1st to 12th grade. If he succeeds, he can win back the company that his father, Mr. Baker had stolen from him by a former friend, Mr. Lucas. With the help of his well meaning but overzealous best friends, Jackson Price, Ed McDoogle and Wiggins, Denton sets out to win the bet, which becomes even more difficult when he falls in love with his 2nd grade crush, Amanda Morrison.

== Cast ==
- Alex Klein as Denton Baker
- Amanda Clayton as Amanda Morrison
- Brian Allen as Jackson Price
- Michael Consiglio as Brandon Lucas
- Yassir Lester as Ed McDoogle
- Jeremiah Watkins as Wiggins
- Paul Natonek as Serj
- Stacy Kaney as Denise Davids
- Dallas Page as Mr. Baker
- Jake Roberts as Mr. Lucas
- Nikki Leigh as Kendra McNulty
- Gerry Bednob as Bob
- Roddy Piper as Mr. Jablonski
- Chris Jay as Scott Quaker
- Dave England as Coffee Shop Employee
- Maureen Shea as Carli Lombardo
- Amanda Cerny as Mrs. McDoogle
- Mindy Robinson as Mrs. Lucas
- Chuck D as Charles McD
- Katie Hilliard as Hayley Matthews
- Erin Marie Hogan as Kaylee Listwan
- Dian Bachar as Angry Video Store Customer
- Meredith Barnett as Danielle
- Julia Cho as Emily Michaels
- Tommy Dreamer as The Umpire
- Larry Longstreth as Delivery Man
- Ali Rose as Sarah Dawn Samuels

== Production ==
The Bet was written by Chris Jay and Aaron Goldberg, members of the rock band Army of Freshmen. The script was inspired by their own experience in searching out and meeting girls on whom they once had crushes in school. They enlisted Reza Riazi, who had worked on one of the band's previous videos, to produce the film. A lifelong wrestling fan, Jay personally sought out and met with Roddy Piper, whose involvement ultimately led to Dallas Page and Jake Roberts joining the film. The rest of the cast was rounded out by actors and comedians, many of whom were personal friends of the filmmakers.

The Bet was filmed entirely in the city of Ventura, California over 13 days in January and February 2014. Many of the locations used have direct connections to Jay and Goldberg, including both of their actual homes, the office where Jay worked, the video store where both Jay and Goldberg had once worked, and the city park where their softball team played.

== Music ==
The Bet features several original comedy songs written by Jay and Goldberg, as well as songs from a diverse group of artists including Matt Pryor of The Get Up Kids, Victor Krummenacher of Camper Van Beethoven, Zebrahead, Punchline, Jonny Polonsky, The K.G.B., Kyle, AMFX, Phil Cody and Army of Freshmen. The soundtrack was released digitally on iTunes and Spotify.

== Release ==
After completion of post-production The Bet received offers from multiple independent film distribution companies, ultimately signing with Screen Media Films in March 2016. The film's first trailer was released on May 3, 2016, and the film was released on July 26, 2016 on all digital VOD platforms.
