= Pop, Songs & Death =

Duo of EPs by Wheatus

The Lightning EP

EP by Wheatus
- Released: 2 June 2009
- Recorded: November 2008–March 2009
- Genre: Alternative rock
- Length: 39:00
- Label: Montauk Mantis
- Producer: Brendan B. Brown

Wheatus chronology
Too Soon Monsoon (2005)	The Lightning EP (2009)	The Jupiter EP (2010)

The Jupiter EP

EP by Wheatus
- Released: 23 December 2010
- Recorded: July 2009–September 2010
- Genre: Alternative rock
- Length: 43:00
- Label: Montauk Mantis
- Producer: Brendan B. Brown

Wheatus chronology
The Lightning EP (2009)	The Jupiter EP (2010)	The Valentine LP (2013)

Pop, Songs & Death is a duo of EPs released by American rock band Wheatus. The first EP, entitled The Lightning EP, was released in June 2009. The second EP, entitled The Jupiter EP, was released in December 2010. The EPs were released as an album, Pop, Songs & Death, in November 2012.

== Background ==
Following the release of Too Soon Monsoon, the band completed a series of extensive tours, which lasted until the summer of 2008. During this time, guitarist and vocalist Brendan B. Brown began writing more material, and in Autumn 2008, the band returned to the recording studio. The material was recorded in DSD, and thus can be downloaded in this audiophile format for playback on PlayStation 3 and modern SACD players. The band decided against another full-length release, and instead chose to issue the songs they had recorded as a series of EPs, entitled the Pop, Songs and Death series. first EP, entitled The Lightning EP, was announced for released in May 2009, and was expected for release on June 1. However, due to numerous technical difficulties including a server crash and difficulty in processing different file types, the album wasn't released until 1:30AM on June 2. The EP was made available using a donation-based system. If the customer donated $5 or less, they would simply receive the six songs contained on the EP. However, if they donated more than $5, they would receive two bonus tracks plus PDF files containing comic strip adaptations of the songs "Real Girl" and "From Listening To Lightning". In December 2009, a physical release of The Lightning EP was made available. The physical release was limited to 500 copies, and contained the deluxe eight-track EP, plus two further bonus tracks not available anywhere else; a DVD containing an exclusive making-of documentary, four-song live set and three music videos; physical copies of the comic strip adaptations of "Real Girl" and "From Listening to Lightning"; plus a hand-signed poster and an individually numbered presentation box.

After touring to promote the EP, the band returned to the studio to record further demos and improve tracks they had previously recorded. In March 2010, Brown announced via his Twitter page that a second EP, entitled The Jupiter EP, would be released in May, using the same format of release as the first EP. However, due to the death of one of the tour personnel, and a series of further tour dates being scheduled, the EP was indefinitely delayed. Brown kept fans informed of the EP's progress, until the EP was finally released for download on December 23, 2010. In a similar format, if the customer donated $5 or less, they would simply receive the six songs contained on the EP. However, if they donated more than $5, they would receive two bonus tracks, plus a PDF file containing the comic strip adaptation of "Bridges To Jupiter". In July 2011, a physical release of The Jupiter EP was made available. The physical release was limited to 500 copies, and contained the deluxe eight-track EP, two further bonus tracks not available anywhere else; a DVD containing an exclusive making-of documentary, music videos to accompany each of the six tracks on the EP, a four-song live set and further bonus content; a physical copy of the comic strip adaptation of "Bridges To Jupiter"; plus a hand-signed poster and an individually numbered presentation box.

In October 2011, the band announced that they would be touring the United Kingdom and thus, a release of both EPs in the UK would accompany the tour. This time, however, the EPs would be packaged together as one album, simply entitled Pop, Songs & Death. The standard edition of the album includes two discs, each containing one respective six-track EP. The deluxe edition of the album includes four discs, containing both deluxe ten-track EPs, both limited edition bonus DVDs, all three physical comic adaptations, plus both hand-signed posters and exclusive content for the UK. A further edition of the album, printed on two 180g vinyl records, was made available via Blacktop Records (Canada) on November 13, 2012. This edition will contain the twelve tracks from the standard versions of each EP, plus individually numbered deluxe gatefold packaging.

The cover artwork of The Lightning EP is a recreation of Ricky Kasso murdering his friend Gary Lauwers in June 1984. Brown stated in a 2011 interview that he had been bullied by Kasso, and the murder (which occurred only blocks away from Brown's home) inspired "From Listening To Lightning", as well as the band's 2000 hit "Teenage Dirtbag".

== Track listing ==
The Lightning EP

1. "From Listening to Lightning" – 11:22
2. "You and Your Stoopid Guitar" – 3:53
3. "Real Girl" – 5:17
4. "Now" – 3:51
5. "If You Need a Friend" – 6:52
6. "Texas" – 7:44
The Lightning EP bonus tracks

Deluxe download bonus tracks

1. "Lemonade" (live in rehearsal) – 5:43
2. "Hometown" (live in rehearsal) – 6:49

Physical edition bonus tracks

1. "Lemonade" (live in rehearsal) – 5:43
2. "Hometown" (live in rehearsal) – 6:49
3. "Real Girl" (acoustic) – 5:28
4. "From Listening to Lightning" (acoustic) – 11:45

Physical Edition Bonus DVD

1. "The Making of The Lightning EP"
2. "Now" (live performance)
3. "From Listening to Lightning" (live performance)
4. "Texas" (live performance)
5. "If You Need a Friend" (live performance)
6. "Real Girl" (music video)
7. "From Listening to Lightning" (music video)
8. "Texas" (music video)

The Jupiter EP

1. "A Fisherman with a Clock" – 7:57
2. "The Story of the Eggs" – 8:25
3. "Freedom Song" – 6:27
4. "So Old N' Told" – 7:00
5. "Dream About the Devil" – 6:48
6. "Bridges to Jupiter" – 8:53
The Jupiter EP bonus tracks

Deluxe download bonus tracks

1. "Pretty Girl" (acoustic) – 4:42
2. "Freak On" (acoustic) – 4:43

Physical edition bonus tracks

1. "Pretty Girl" (acoustic) – 4:42
2. "Freak On" (acoustic) – 4:43
3. "So Old N' Told" (original demo) – 3:32
4. "Dream About the Devil" (original demo) – 3:13

Physical edition bonus DVD

1. "The Making of The Jupiter EP"
2. "A Fisherman with a Clock" (music video)
3. "The Story of the Eggs" (music video)
4. "Freedom Song" (music video)
5. "So Old N' Told" (music video)
6. "Dream About the Devil" (music video)
7. "Bridges to Jupiter" (music video)
8. "Lemonade" (live performance)
9. "Hometown" (live performance)
10. "Dynomite Satchel of Pain" (live performance)
11. "American in Amsterdam" (live performance)
12. "Hidden Content"

Pop, Songs & Death

1. "From Listening to Lightning" – 11:22
2. "You and Your Stoopid Guitar" – 3:53
3. "Real Girl" – 5:17
4. "Now" – 3:51
5. "If You Need a Friend" – 6:52
6. "Texas" – 7:44
7. "A Fisherman with a Clock" – 7:57
8. "The Story of the Eggs" – 8:25
9. "Freedom Song" – 6:27
10. "So Old N' Told" – 7:00
11. "Dream About the Devil" – 6:48
12. "Bridges to Jupiter" – 8:53
