= Wheatus =

American rock band

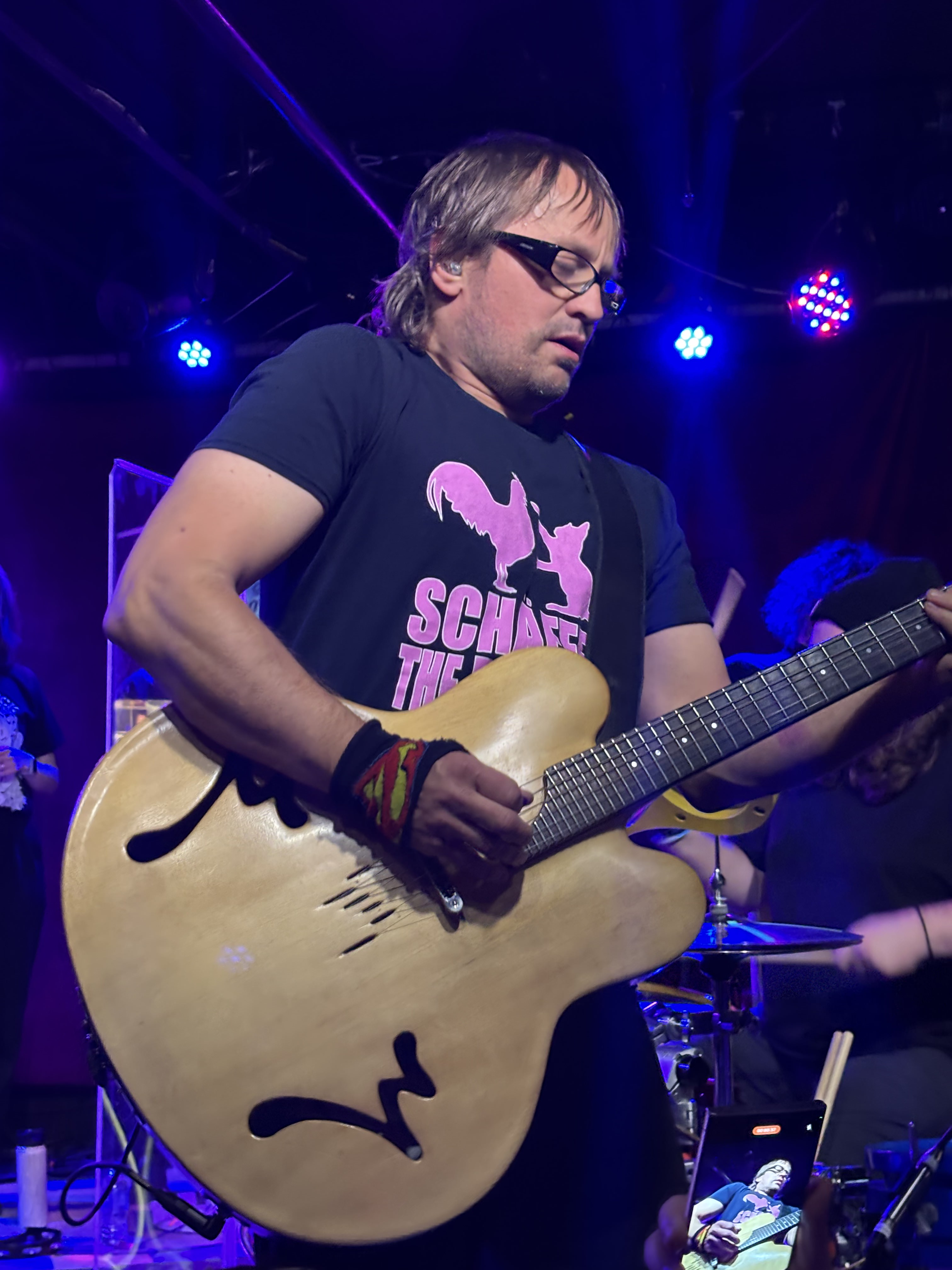
- Wheatus frontman, Brendan B. Brown, performing in 2025

Background information
- Origin: New York City, U.S.
- Genres: Alternative rock; pop rock; power pop
- Years active: 1995–present
- Labels: Columbia; Sony; Montauk Mantis; Ineffable
- Members: Brendan B. Brown; Matthew Milligan; Brandon Ticer; Dustyn Murphy; Joey Slater; Gabrielle Sterbenz
- Past members: See members section
- Website: wheatus.com

Wheatus is an American rock band from New York City, formed in 1995. Their 2000 single, "Teenage Dirtbag" and 2001 cover version of Erasure's "A Little Respect" charted worldwide. Their self-titled album was certified platinum in the United Kingdom.

== History ==
=== 1995–2002: Formation and Wheatus ===
Wheatus was formed in 1995 by Brendan Bernard Brown, who plays guitar and sings, on the Lower East Side of New York City. Brown began by writing a few songs and subsequently enlisted his brother Peter on drums, Rich Liegey on bass and backing vocals, and Philip A. Jimenez on various percussion instruments, keyboards, harmonica, samples, and special effects. The band derives its name from the nickname "wedus" given to the Brown brothers by their father when they were children. In 1999, they hired New York producer Ray Maiello, who booked them at New York's Luna Lounge for regular appearances. Maiello distributed the group's self-produced debut album, including to major record labels and to A&R executive Kevin Patrick from Columbia Records. Maiello then arranged for Patrick to see the band play at the Mercury Lounge, and Patrick subsequently signed Wheatus to a multi-album deal, with Maiello as the band's manager. Their self-titled debut album was released on August 15, 2000, and spawned their first and most successful hit, "Teenage Dirtbag", which charted at No. 1 in Australia and the United Kingdom. Their second single, a cover of Erasure's "A Little Respect", peaked at No. 3 on the UK Singles Chart. The third single from the album, a double A-side of "Leroy" and "Wannabe Gangstar", was less successful, reaching No. 23 on the UK Singles Chart. Another song from the album, "Punk Ass Bitch", was bought by the creators of Jackie Chan Adventures and reworked as "Chan's the Man", the end credits theme for the program's first season.

=== 2002–2005: Hand Over Your Loved Ones and Suck Fony ===
Wheatus began work on their second album in 2002, with Brendan enlisting his sister Liz and the band's merchandiser, Kathryn Froggatt, as backing vocalists. Shannon Harris of Relish, a group that had supported Wheatus on their earlier tours, was also added to the band as keyboardist. When the album, Hand Over Your Loved Ones, was released in 2003, it received little promotion in the UK and was not issued in the US. In October 2004, the band decided to leave their record label and form their own, Montauk Mantis. During this time, they enlisted Michael Bellar as a replacement for Harris. In February 2005, Wheatus re-released Hand Over Your Loved Ones under the new title Suck Fony. It included the new tracks "William McGovern" and a cover of Pat Benatar's "Hit Me with Your Best Shot".

=== 2005–2007: Lineup changes and Too Soon Monsoon ===
Bassist Mike McCabe left the band in March 2005, shortly after the release of Suck Fony; he was replaced by Nicolas diPierro. The band subsequently began recording a new album in April 2005, and three months later, the first single, "BMX Bandits", was released. In October 2005, the band's third studio album, Too Soon Monsoon, was issued. Since early 2010, it has been available via a "pay what you want" donation scheme via the band's official website. Days after the release, Bellar left the band, and Gerard Hoffmann replaced him. A second single, "The London Sun", was released in February 2006. diPierro departed the band and was replaced by bassist Matt Milligan. A further lineup change occurred in May 2006, when drummer Pete Brown quit music to get married. He was replaced with Kevin Garcia, leaving Brendan Brown as the only remaining original member. The next lineup change occurred five days later, when Froggatt left the band due to pregnancy. She was replaced by Connie Renda, who, in turn, traded places with Missy Heselton. In February 2007, Wheatus joined the UK leg of the Get Happy Tour, along with founders Bowling for Soup and Army of Freshmen and British pop-punk band Son of Dork, for a sold-out 13-show tour. Liz Brown and Missy Heselton both left the group around this time.

=== 2007–2012: Pop, Songs & Death ===
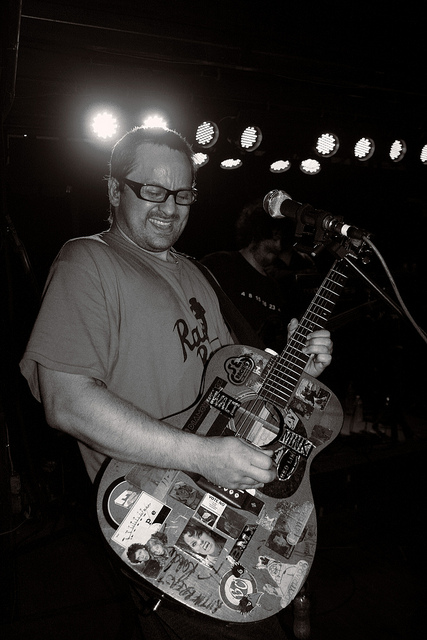
Brendan B. Brown performing with Wheatus in 2010

Wheatus began recording new material in October 2007. Its release was carried over until February 2008, when a video for the song "Real Girl" was uploaded to YouTube. In March, the band performed several shows in the US and also announced dates for an acoustic performance in the UK. In October, they completed a tour of the UK, during which some of the new material was showcased in acoustic form. In November, the band returned to the recording studio and set a release date for a six-track EP, entitled Pop, Songs & Death, Vol 1: The Lightning EP. In early 2009, Brown composed music for April Showers, a film that deals with the Columbine High School massacre. On June 1, 2009, The Lightning EP was expected for release, but it was not available until June 2 due to a series of technical difficulties, including a server crash on the band's website. In January 2010, Wheatus began a worldwide theater tour, with dates spanning the US, UK, and Austria. They were supported by nerdcore rapper MC Frontalot. In April 2010, Brown announced via his Twitter page that Pop, Songs & Death, Vol. 2: The Jupiter EP was scheduled for release in May 2010. However, this was pushed back to December 23, 2010.

In November 2012, the EPs were released together as the band's fourth studio album, Pop, Songs and Death.

=== 2012–2014: The Valentine LP ===
Following a re-release of the single "Lemonade", supported by the first of three Lego videos created by Oliver Broadbent, Wheatus released their fifth studio album, The Valentine LP, in 2013. Brown described it as a set of "post-apocalyptic love songs", adding that he delved into the concept of "reconstituting society, fighting zombies, and trying to maintain some kind of romantic relationship at the same time".

An album sampler was released on YouTube on July 27, 2013, while full tracks from the record were uploaded between August 14 and September 9. The Valentine LP was released on August 2, 2013, through the band's website, with a vinyl version shipping in late 2013. The digital version of the album includes a PDF entitled "Valentine Comic", with concept art depicting a zombie apocalypse love story, designed by graphic artist Ecol (Eric Collins). In September and October 2013, the band toured the UK. Before the tour, long-term drummer Kevin Garcia left and was replaced by William Tully.

Following the album's release, Wheatus recorded a new single, "Only You", a collaboration with two members of One Direction's band, bassist Sandy Beales and drummer Josh Devine. The single was released on July 6, 2014. The collaboration came about as a result of One Direction covering "Teenage Dirtbag" on their Where We Are Tour. The Valentine LP was released on CD through Blacktop Records in the UK in 2014, with three bonus tracks: "Only You", a single mix of "Holiday", and an acoustic version of "Only You".

=== 2014–present: Sixth studio album, classic lineup reunion ===
Since 2014, Wheatus has been in the process of recording a sixth studio album. Tentatively titled Beasts of the Unknown, Brown has stated that the direction of the record will be "80's metal", inspired by the bands he grew up listening to as a teenager. The first track from the album, "Zelda", first appeared in the band's live setlist in late 2014. Recording was due to take place in late 2015, until plans for a tour celebrating the fifteenth anniversary of their debut album were announced. During this time, drummer William Tully left, and Leo Freire replaced him. Joey Slater also replaced Karlie Bruce after she left for a second time. Wheatus then toured with Busted on their 2016 Pigs Can Fly arena tour.

In late 2016, Brown stated in an interview, "Album [seven] is almost ready to be recorded, and we'll be working on that over the winter and hope to have that done by 2017". He also mentioned that twenty songs had been written for the release, and the band was aiming to record them all before the start of the year. "Tipsy" was released as the album's lead single on December 22, 2016. After announcing a further UK tour for April and May 2017, Brown stated that recording had again halted. During this time, keyboardist Mark Palmer left the band, with Brandon Ticer brought in as his replacement. Karlie Bruce returned on backing vocals after a three-year absence, joining Gabrielle Sterbenz and Joey Slater. On June 8, 2018, "Lullaby" was released as the album's second single. A further new song, "Michelle", was first performed live in September 2018.

In November 2018, Wheatus returned to the UK to tour as a support act for A. In early 2019, the band provided direct support to Mike Doughty on the first leg of his twenty-fifth anniversary tour of Soul Coughing's Ruby Vroom, their first full US tour in many years. For these shows, drummer Madden Klass replaced Freire. Brown, Milligan, and Klass also sat in as members of Doughty's band for the duration of the tour.

In early 2019, Wheatus announced plans for their first world tour since 2000, playing in the US and South Africa as well as 48 dates across Germany, the Netherlands, and the UK. On April 5, 2019, they played a special show at the Mercury Lounge in New York, which featured two sets: one with the current lineup and one from the "classic" lineup, with Peter Brown, Mike McCabe, Phil Jimenez, Liz Brown, and Kathryn Froggatt performing together for the first time since 2003. During the Welsh dates of the band's world tour, Brown expressed support for Scottish and Welsh independence from the UK, showing up at a "Yes" rally march.

As well as continuing to record their sixth album, Brown stated that the band was in the midst of preparing a 20th-anniversary expanded edition of their self-titled debut album, due out in 2020 alongside a 20th-anniversary tour. A 20th-anniversary re-recording of their debut, titled Wheatus 2020, was released in December 2023.

In October 2023, Wheatus returned to Sony to release a five-track EP titled Just a Dirtbag Christmas. Drummer Dustyn Murphy joined the band in August 2024. On November 15, 2025, the band announced that their original, longtime percussionist/multi-instrumentalist, Phil Jimenez, would be rejoining them on their upcoming tour of the UK and Ireland, after a 22-year absence.

"Teenage Dirtbag" achieved a resurgence in the 2020s, becoming trendy and memefied on social media.

== Band members ==
=== Current ===
- Brendan B. Brown – lead vocals, guitars (1995–present)
- Matthew Milligan – bass (2006–present)
- Gabrielle Aimée Sterbenz – backing vocals (2011–present)
- Joey Slater – backing vocals (2015–present)
- Brandon Ticer – keyboards (2017–present)
- Dustyn Murphy – drums (2024–present)

=== Past ===
Drums

- Peter McCarrick Brown (also backing vocals, turntables, and samples) (1995–2006)
- Kevin Joaquin Garcia (2006–2013)
- James Williams (touring replacement for Kevin Garcia) (2011)
- William Tully (2013–2014)
- Leo Freire (2015–2022)
- Madden Klass (drums/percussion) (2019–2022)
- KC Marotta (2022–2024) percussion (2024)
- Gui Fuentes – drums (2024)

Keyboards

- Philip A. Jimenez – percussion, samples, turntables, keyboards, harmonica, banjo, special effects, multiple other instruments (1995–2003; occasional collaborator 2025–present)
- Shannon Patrick Harris (2002–2004)
- Michael Bellar (2004–2005)
- Gerard Charles Hoffmann (2005–2011)
- Ken Flagg (2011)
- Mark Palmer (2011–2016)

Bass

- Rich Liegey (also backing vocals) (1995–2000)
- Mike Joseph McCabe (also backing vocals) (2000–2005)
- Nicolas DiPierro (2005–2006)

Backing vocals

- Elizabeth Grace Brown (2002–2007; 2014)
- Kathryn Elizabeth Froggatt (2002–2006)
- Vanessa Jimenez (2003)
- Melissa "Missy" Heselton (2006–2007)
- Constance Renda (2006)
- Johanna Cranitch (2007–2011)
- Georgia Haege (2007–2008)
- Dani Elliott (2011)
- Delaney Gibson (2011)
- Karlie Bruce – backing vocals (2012–2014; 2017–2019)

== Discography ==
- Wheatus (2000)
- Hand Over Your Loved Ones (2003)
- Too Soon Monsoon (2005)
- Pop, Songs & Death (2012)
- The Valentine LP (2013)
- Wheatus 2020 (2023)
