= Amanda Clayton =

American actress

- Born: Johnston, Rhode Island, U.S.
- Occupation: Actress
- Years active: 2006–present

Amanda Clayton is an American actress, known for her roles as Alex Montgomery in the Oprah Winfrey Network prime time soap opera, If Loving You Is Wrong, and as Catherine "Cathy" Ryan in the Showtime crime drama series, City on a Hill.

== Life and career ==
Clayton was born in Johnston, Rhode Island. She studied at the University of Rhode Island and later moved to New York City to attend New York Conservatory for Dramatic Arts in 2005. She made her film debut in 2006, playing a supporting role in the independent film December Ends. In 2012, Clayton landed the supporting role of Sarah Carter in the Disney adventure film John Carter. She later went to appear in guest starring roles on The Mentalist and Rizzoli & Isles.

In 2014, she was cast as a lead, alongside Edwina Findley, Heather Hemmens, Zulay Henao, and April Parker Jones in the Oprah Winfrey Network prime time soap opera If Loving You Is Wrong. The series ended in 2020 after five seasons. Later in 2014, she was cast opposite Miles Teller and Katey Sagal in the biographical drama film Bleed For This about boxer, Vinny Pazienza.

In addition to Bleed For This, Clayton is the female lead in two additional feature-length films set for release in 2016, the comedy, The Bet and the drama, Bad Frank. In 2017, she played the leading role in the Lifetime Movie Cradle Swapping, and the following year in Mommy's Little Angel.

In 2018, Clayton was cast in the Showtime drama series, City on a Hill. She left the series after the second season in 2021. In 2026, she made her directorial debut with the true-crime biopic, Lupo.

== Filmography ==
=== Film ===
Year	Film	Role	Notes
2006	December Ends	Nicole	
2006	Goomar	Goomar	Short film
2010	Two Years	Short film	Short film
2012	John Carter	Sarah Carter	
2012	Little Red Elephant	Riley	Short film
2016	The Bet	Amanda Morrison	
2016	Bleed for This	Doreen Pazienza	
2017	Bad Frank	Gina Pierce	IndieFEST Film Award for Best Supporting Actor; Nominated — World Music & Independent Film Festival Award for Best Actress; Nominated — International Filmmaker Festival of World Cinema, Milan for Best Actress in a Feature Film
2017	Cradle Swapping	Alicia	
2018	Mommy's Little Angel	Nikki Bilson	Television film
2018	Dirty Dead Con Men	Lori	Also producer
2023	The Bastard Sons		Producer
2024	Beyond the Rush	Tristan Grievess	
2025	Topper	Allie	
2025	Marshmallow	Deputy Maxwell	
2026	Lupo	Cynthia Rulli	Also director, writer and producer

=== Television ===
Year	Title	Role	Notes
2012	The Mentalist	Kelly Burbage	Episode: "Red Dawn"
2012	Rizzoli & Isles	Valentina Smith	Episode: "Over/Under"
2013	Victorious	Tilda	Episode: "The Slap Fight"
2014	The Soul Man	Sandi	Episode: "Back in the Day"
2014–2020	If Loving You Is Wrong	Alex Montgomery	Series regular, 108 episodes
2015	Constantine	Renee	Episode: "Quid Pro Quo"
2016	Major Crimes	Lisa Cornell	Episode: "N.S.F.W."
2016	Rosewood	Jodi Carvel	Episode: "Tree Toxins & Three Stories"
2017	NCIS: New Orleans	Eliza West	Episode: "Follow the Money "
2017	NCIS: Los Angeles	Anna Ross	Episode: "The Silo"
2019—2022	City on a Hill	Catherine "Cathy" Ryan	Series regular, 18 episodes
2023	NCIS	Lieutenant Rachel Donahue	Episode: "Head Games"
2024	9-1-1	Walter's Lawyer	Episode: "Confessions"
2025	NCIS: Origins	Detective Fields	Episode: "End of the Road"
