= Wheatus (album) =

2000 studio album by Wheatus

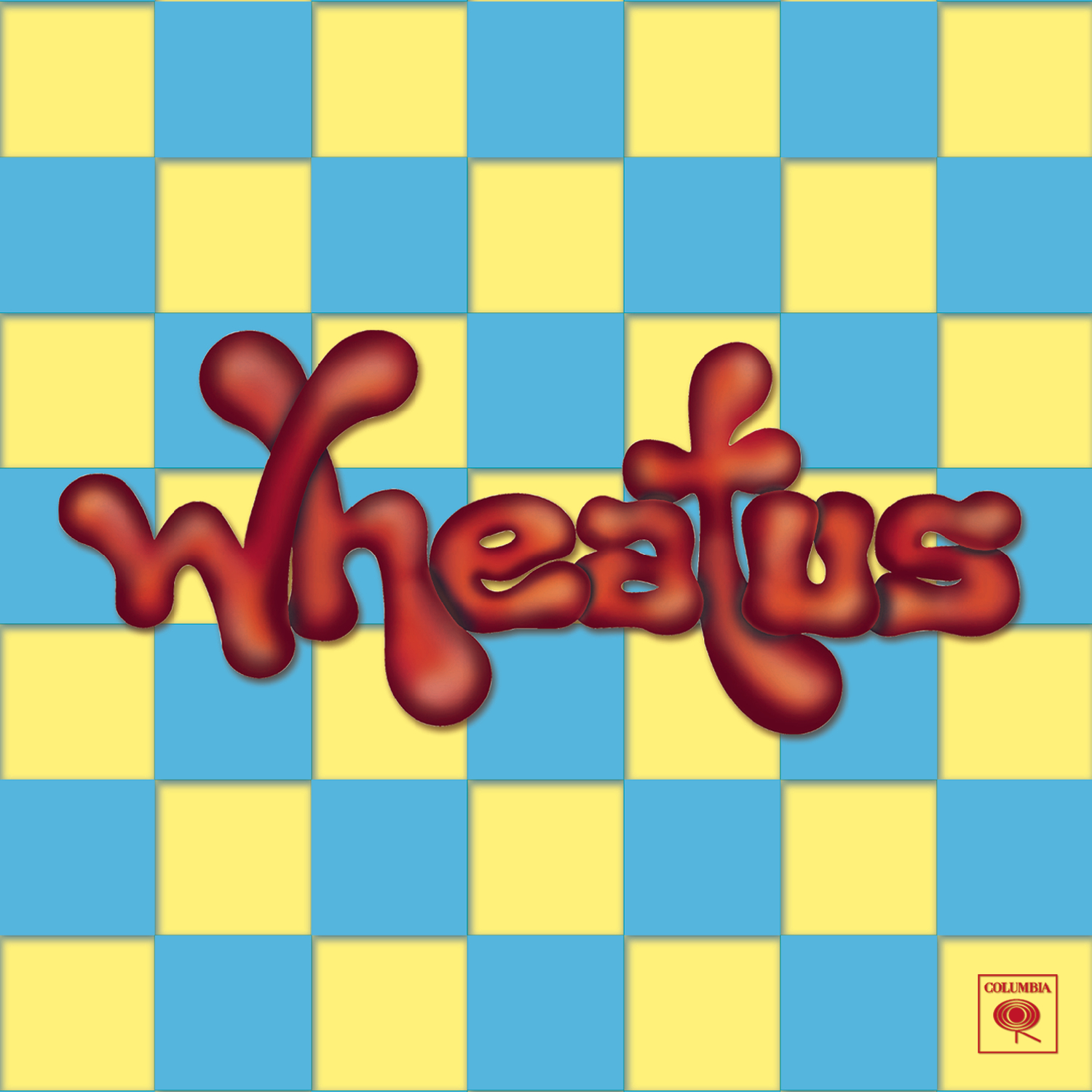

Studio album by Wheatus
- Released: August 15, 2000
- Recorded: April 1999 – April 2000
- Studios: Brendan B. Brown's mother's basement Northport, New York
- Genres: Pop rock; pop-punk; alternative rock
- Length: 33:14
- Label: Columbia
- Producers: Wheatus, Philip A. Jimenez

Wheatus chronology
Wheatus (2000)	Hand Over Your Loved Ones (2003)

Singles from Wheatus
- 1. "Teenage Dirtbag" Released: June 20, 2000; 2. "A Little Respect" Released: July 2, 2001; 3. "Wannabe Gangstar" / "Leroy" Released: January 22, 2002

Wheatus is the debut studio album by the American rock band Wheatus, released by Columbia Records on August 15, 2000. Written mostly by guitarist and vocalist Brendan B. Brown, it was recorded in the basement of Brown's mother's house, and self-produced by the band with the help of multiple mixing engineers and George Marino as mastering engineer.

In June 2000, "Teenage Dirtbag" was released as the album's first single, and peaked at number 7 on the Billboard Alternative Airplay Chart and number 2 on the UK Singles Chart. "A Little Respect", an Erasure cover, was released as the second single in July 2001. "Wannabe Gangstar"/"Leroy", a double A-side single, was released in January 2002 as the final single.

== Background ==
Wheatus formed in 1995 after guitarist and vocalist Brendan B. Brown left the skate-pop band Mr. Jones to write his own material. Brown brought in his younger brother, Peter, to play drums and Rich Liegey to play bass. Peter enjoyed the songs Brendan had written. Multi-instrumentalist and engineer Phil A. Jimenez wanted to work with Brown after hearing "Teenage Dirtbag", The energy "of the pop elements" in addition to "the story-telling and the social commentary" made Jimenez feel like he "really wanted to be a part of [the band]."

== Composition ==
All of the material on Wheatus was written by Brendan B. Brown, except for "Punk Ass Bitch", which was written by bassist Rich Liegey, and their cover of Erasure's "A Little Respect", which was written by Vince Clarke and Andy Bell. The song titles came to Brown first with the subject matter following as he considered the name "an emotional blueprint". Brown mentioned that the beat in "Teenage Dirtbag" was "sort of a hip-hop thing" and that the guitars "are definitely heavy metal". Brown had the chorus melody and the "oh yeah" section before finishing the song's lyrics, it was "one of those once-in-a-lifetime melodies that works for every reason." Brown claimed the song was autobiographical, however, none of the band members "wound up getting the girl in the end. So I guess that's the inspiration—the hope that that happens to someone someday."

Talking about "Truffles" and "Wannabe Gangstar", Brown explained that when you're younger "You can't do anything [...]. You have no power; you have no resources. You're subject to everyone else's crap". "Sunshine", the first song written for the album, was Brown realizing he was working for the wrong kind of people. "Hump'Em N' Dump'Em" was written when the Senate was thinking of impeaching the president. "Hey, Mr. Brown" was written after Brown was not being paid for something he had done. "Love Is a Mutt from Hell" was about a dysfunctional romance. "Wannabe Gangster" was inspired by "white, middle class glorification of inner city problems", according to Brown.

== Recording ==
Using the knowledge he gained from being in his former band, Wheatus was recorded in the basement of Brown's mother's house. A control room was set up in the dining room, with a one hundred-foot cable leading down to the basement. Wheatus was produced and engineered by Wheatus and Philip A. Jimenez. One of the reasons the band self-produced the album was their idea to take specific sounds from different genres and include them into songs. Brown explained that "When you're a small band and nothing's going on for you, you can't explain to somebody bigger than you [...] what you want to do. They just won't care." New York-based band Soul Coughing had a big influence on the production of the album.

Despite the multitude of electric guitar tones, no electric guitars were used in the recording process. The tones originate from Brown's acoustic Martin guitar, which is set up through two preamplifiers which are connected to their own power amplifiers. Brown can swap between the preamplifiers with the aid of an expression pedal so that he is able to "swell into a distortion sound while fading out the clean tone". Brown claimed he does not know "[that] many guitar players", thus he took three different guitar sounds that he enjoyed and merged them into his sound. Jimenez provided percussion, harmonica and banjo. David Thoener mixed almost all of the tracks apart from "Wannabe Gangstar", which was mixed by Brown, and "A Little Respect", which was mixed by Richard A. LaSalvia. The album was mastered by George Marino at Sterling Sound in New York.

== Release ==
Wheatus was named artist of week at billboardtalentnet.com in February 2000. In March, Wheatus signed to Columbia. Liegey left the band prior to the release of Wheatus and was replaced by Mike McCabe in July, who left his job as a flight attendant to join the band. "Teenage Dirtbag" was released as a single on July 18. The music video, directed by Jeff Gordon, was nominated for Best Video at the Kerrang! Awards. The song was given extra promotion due to its inclusion on the soundtrack to the film Loser (2000). According to an issue of Billboard dated July 2000 Wheatus was the most-download artist at billboardtalentnet.com. In the same issue, it mentioned that the band's debut album was planned to be called Teenage Dirtbag and was set for release on August 1. Instead, Wheatus was released through Columbia on August 15. (Note: US Columbia 62146) In September, the band toured the US.

Wheatus toured the UK in April 2001. "A Little Respect" was released as a single on July 2. The music video, directed by Brendan Malloy, is about how a boyfriend fails to impress his girlfriend until Wheatus stages a private concert for the pair. It features Shawn Hatosy and Brittany Murphy. Wheatus tour the UK again in November and December 2001. A double A-side single of "Wannabe Gangstar" and "Leroy" was released on January 22, 2002. The music video for "Wannabe Gangstar" was directed by Gordon, while the video for "Leroy" was directed by Mark Hartley. A remixed version of "Wannabe Ganstar" featuring Iron Maiden vocalist Bruce Dickinson was released earlier on January 7. In March, Brown asked Shannon Harris to join the band as a keyboardist. Tired of being a session musician, Harris accepted. Harris moved to New York and lived with Brown. The band toured the UK in June.

== Reception and legacy ==
Professional ratings
Review scores
Source	Rating
AllMusic	4/5 stars
ChartAttack	favorable
Consequence of Sound	favorable
Drowned in Sound	6/10
Entertainment Weekly	C
Exclaim!	favorable
NME	2/5 stars
Ox-Fanzine	Unfavorable
PopMatters	favorable

"Teenage Dirtbag" reached number two on the UK Singles Chart and number seven on the US Alternative Songs chart. Wheatus charted at number 76 in the US and number seven in the UK. In February 2001, the "Teenage Dirtbag" single was certified silver in the UK and in the following month it was certified gold. The album was certified silver in the UK in April 2001. The following month, it was certified gold in the UK. "A Little Respect" peaked at number 3 in the UK. By August, the album had sold one million copies worldwide. "Wannabe Gangstar"/"Leroy" peaked at number 22 in the UK.

In July 2013, the album was certified platinum in the UK, as was the "Teenage Dirtbag" single. The single is also certified three times platinum in Australia. In July 2014, the "A Little Respect" single was certified silver. By August 2015, the album had sold over five million copies worldwide. Discussing the album's legacy, Brown revealed that the recognition "did not initially happen in America. At home we were a bit under the radar. Most people at the label didn't really understand how we fitted, or didn't fit, into what was happening in music at the time." The band played the album in full in the UK in September and October with support from Mike Doughty and The Hipstones.

== Track listing ==
All songs written by Brendan Brown, except where noted.

No.	Title	Writer(s)	Length
1.	"Truffles"		2:10
2.	"Sunshine"		3:16
3.	"Teenage Dirtbag"		4:07
4.	"A Little Respect"	Vince Clarke, Andy Bell	3:19
5.	"Hump'Em n' Dump'Em"		3:38
6.	"Leroy"		3:19
7.	"Hey, Mr. Brown"		2:10
8.	"Love Is a Mutt from Hell"		4:23
9.	"Punk Ass Bitch"	Rich Liegey	3:09
10.	"Wannabe Gangstar"		3:45

B-sides
1. "I'd Never Write a Song About You" – 3:38
2. "Pretty Girl" – 4:29
3. "Hey, Mr. Brown" (with Club Audience) – 2:22
4. "Sunshine" (remix) – 2:52
5. "A Little Respect" (David Thoener mix #1) – 3:25
6. "Teenage Dirtbag" (live at the chapel) – 4:43
7. "Leroy" (live at the chapel) – 3:40
8. "Wannabe Gangstar" (live at the chapel) – 4:01
9. "Truffles" (live at the chapel) – 3:51
10. "Sunshine" (X-ecutioners remix) – 2:52
11. "Pretty Girl" (live at the chapel) – 5:01
12. "Wannabe Gangstar" (Soulchild radio remix)
13. "Wannabe Gangstar" (featuring Bruce Dickinson)
14. "Leroy" (Brendan's mix)
15. "Leroy" (live from V festival, 2001)
16. "Hey, Mr. Brown" (live from V festival, 2001)
17. "Pretty Girl" (Virgin radio acoustic version)
18. "Hey, Mr. Brown" (live in Australia) – 2:11
19. "Leroy" (edit) – 3:05

== Personnel ==
Personnel per booklet.

Wheatus

- Brendan B. Brown – vocals, guitar
- Rich Liegey – vocals, bass guitar
- Peter Brown – drums, backing vocals, additional percussion
- Philip A. Jimenez – percussion, keyboards, harmonica, banjo

Additional musician

- Pippi Longscratchings – scratching on "Teenage Dirtbag"

Production

- Wheatus – producer, engineer
- David Thoener – mixing (except "Wannabe Gangstar" and "A Little Respect")
- Brendan B. Brown – mixing on "Wannabe Gangstar"
- Richard A. LaSalvia – mixing on "A Little Respect"
- George Marino – mastering
- Gary Montalvo – art direction, design
- Gail Marowitz – art direction
- Raphael Fuchs – photographs
- Jeffrey Bender – photographs

== Charts ==
=== Weekly charts ===
Chart (2001)	Peak position
Australian Albums (ARIA)	55
Austrian Albums (Ö3 Austria)	7
Belgian Albums (Ultratop Flanders)	18
Belgian Albums (Ultratop Wallonia)	25
Canadian Alternative Albums (Nielsen Soundscan)	27
Dutch Albums (Album Top 100)	96
German Albums (Offizielle Top 100)	13
Irish Albums (IRMA)	13
New Zealand Albums (RMNZ)	48
Scottish Albums (Official Charts)	5
Swedish Albums (Sverigetopplistan)	44
Swiss Albums (Schweizer Hitparade)	22
UK Albums (Official Charts)	7
UK Rock & Metal Albums (Official Charts)	1
US Billboard 200	76

=== Year-end charts ===
Chart (2001)	Position
Austrian Albums (Ö3 Austria)	45
Belgian Albums (Ultratop Flanders)	73
German Albums (Offizielle Top 100)	53
UK Albums (OCC)	65

== Certifications ==
Region	Certification	Certified units/sales
New Zealand (RMNZ)	Platinum	15,000^{‡}
United Kingdom (BPI)	Platinum	300,000^{^}
^{^} Shipments figures based on certification alone.^{‡} Sales+streaming figures based on certification alone.

== Wheatus 2020 ==
Wheatus 2020

Studio album (re-recorded) by Wheatus
- Released: December 1, 2023
- Recorded: 2020–2023
- Genres: Alternative rock; pop rock; pop-punk
- Length: 33:14
- Labels: Montauk Mantis; Ineffable
- Producer: Brendan B. Brown

Wheatus chronology
M (Live in America) (2020)	Wheatus 2020 (2023)

Singles from Wheatus 2020
- 1. "Teenage Dirtbag" / "Mope" Released: August 15, 2020; 2. "Sunshine" / "Through" Released: February 28, 2021; 3. "I'd Never Write a Song About You" / "Temporary Song" Released: May 1, 2021; 4. "Hump'Em n' Dump'Em" / "F.B.S.M." Released: May 15, 2021; 5. "Truffles" / "People" Released: January 21, 2022; 6. "Love Is a Mutt from Hell" / "Mullet" Released: May 13, 2022; 7. "Hey Mr. Brown" / "Satan's Orders" Released: September 13, 2022; 8. "Leroy" / "Semolina" Released: November 11, 2022; 9. "Wannabe Gangstar" / "Dead Again" Released: March 24, 2023; 10. "Pretty Girl" / "Dark Day" Released: October 20, 2023

Wheatus 2020 is a re-recording of Wheatus' self-titled debut album, released on December 1, 2023, via the band's own Montauk Mantis Records. Every track was released as a single prior to the album.

The idea to re-record the album came when the band found out that Sony had lost the master tapes for the album, after originally planning a 20th anniversary re-release. The first single, being a re-recording of "Teenage Dirtbag," was released in April 2020, which according to singer Brendan Brown, was released on the "twenty-years-to-the-day anniversary of when we delivered it to Sony music."

The tracks "A Little Respect" and "Punk Ass Bitch" are the only two excluded from the re-recording, with the B-sides "Pretty Girl" and "I'd Never Write a Song About You" taking their places. 10 new original tracks are also included, with Brown confirming they were initially unfinished tracks that "sounded like they belonged on Album 1."

=== Track listing ===
All songs written by Brendan B. Brown, except where noted.

No.	Title	Writer(s)	Length
1.	"Truffles"		2:18
2.	"Sunshine"		3:29
3.	"Teenage Dirtbag"		4:25
4.	"Pretty Girl"		4:37
5.	"Hump'Em n' Dump'Em"		3:41
6.	"Leroy"		3:21
7.	"Hey, Mr. Brown"		2:09
8.	"Love Is a Mutt from Hell"		4:22
9.	"I'd Never Write a Song About You"		3:42
10.	"Wannabe Gangstar"		3:55
11.	"Mope"		3:38
12.	"Semolina"	Brown; Joey Slater	3:50
13.	"Temporary Song"		4:05
14.	"People"		2:57
15.	"Through"	Slater	3:33
16.	"Satan's Orders"		2:23
17.	"Mullet" (ft. Schaffer the Darklord)		4:15
18.	"F.B.S.M."	Brown; Slater; Karlie Bruce; Leo Freire; Madden Klass; Matthew Milligan; Gabrielle Sterbenz; Brandon Ticer	3:44
19.	"Dead Again"		2:55
20.	"Dark Day"		5:05
Total length:			60:12

=== Personnel ===
Personnel per album's liner notes.

- Brendan B. Brown – vocals, guitar, percussion, production, engineering, mixing, art direction
- Sandy Beales – bass (13)
- Declan Brown – drums (10)
- Fiona Brown – guitar (10)
- Seamus Brown – bass (10)
- Josh Devine – drums, percussion (13); shaker (2); engineering
- Leo Freire – drums, percussion; backing vocals (7, 8)
- Kevin Garcia – percussion (18)
- Philip A. Jimenez – percussion, harmonica, accordion (4, 6); mixing
- Madden Klass – drums (15)
- Matthew Milligan – bass; scratching (3); engineering
- Joey Slater – backing vocals, engineering, art direction
- Gabrielle Sterbenz – backing vocals, engineering
- Brandon Ticer – keyboards; banjo (2)
- Levi Wilson – engineering
- Paul Gold – mastering
