= Danielle Taylor (footballer) =

New Zealand footballer

Personal information
- Full name: Danielle Taylor

International career
| Years | Team | Apps | (Gls) |
| 2003–2007 | New Zealand | 5 | (1) |

Danielle Taylor is a former association football player who represented New Zealand at international level.

Taylor made her Football Ferns début in a 0–0 draw with Korea Republic on 23 March 1996, and finished her international career with five caps and one goal to her credit.
