= Hand Over Your Loved Ones =

Studio album by Wheatus
- Released: September 8, 2003; February 14, 2005 (Suck Fony)
- Recorded: June 2002 – June 2003
- Genre: Pop rock
- Length: 48:42; 55:52 (Suck Fony)
- Labels: Columbia; Montauk Mantis (Suck Fony)
- Producer: Brendan B. Brown

Wheatus chronology
Wheatus (2000)	Hand Over Your Loved Ones (2003)	Lemonade (2004)

Suck Fony cover

Professional ratings
Review scores
Source	Rating
AllMusic	(Suck Fony)
entertainment.ie	(Hand Over Your Loved Ones)
The Guardian	(Hand Over Your Loved Ones)
Leeds Music Scene	(Suck Fony)
Melodic	(Hand Over Your Loved Ones)

Hand Over Your Loved Ones (re-released as Suck Fony) is the second studio album by American rock band Wheatus.

== Background ==
Hand Over Your Loved Ones, according to frontman Brendan B. Brown, is "a really glossy pop record that had a lot of radio friendly singles on it."

== Release ==
The album was released on September 8, 2003 by Columbia Records. Due to conflicts between the band and their record label, the album was poorly promoted, failed to sell well and only one single, "American In Amsterdam", was released from it. Free from their contract with Sony, Wheatus released five songs from the album on iTunes as The Lemonade EP in 2004.

The album was re-released on February 14, 2005 under the name Suck Fony, on the band's own record label Montauk Mantis Productions, after they decided to leave Sony BMG. The re-released version includes two new tracks, including the original composition "William McGovern", and the Pat Benatar cover "Hit Me with Your Best Shot". The album is currently available directly from the band's official website for $10, and is available to download in various formats using a 'pay what you want' donation system where the customer can donate any amount to purchase the album. The album's title is a spoonerism of the phrase "Fuck Sony". A T-shirt was available for a period of time from the band's website with the album logo on the front.

== Track listing ==
=== Hand Over Your Loved Ones ===
1. "American in Amsterdam" – 3:58
2. "The Song That I Wrote When You Dissed Me" – 4:04
3. "Anyway" – 4:09
4. "Freak On" – 4:44
5. "Lemonade" – 3:22
6. "The Deck" – 2:38
7. "Fair Weather Friend" – 3:25
8. "Randall" – 4:18
9. "Whole Amoeba" – 3:07
10. "Dynomite Satchel of Pain" – 14:57

=== Suck Fony ===
1. "The Deck" – 2:37
2. "Lemonade" – 3:23
3. "Hit Me with Your Best Shot" – 3:22
4. "Anyway" – 4:08
5. "Freak On" – 4:44
6. "William McGovern" – 3:48
7. "American in Amsterdam" – 3:57
8. "Fair Weather Friend" – 3:25
9. "Randall" – 4:18
10. "Whole Amoeba" – 3:08
11. "The Song That I Wrote When You Dissed Me" – 4:02
12. "Dynomite Satchel of Pain" – 4:17
- Hidden tracks

13. "The Song That I Wrote When You Dissed Me" (Demo #1) – 3:21
14. "The Song That I Wrote When You Dissed Me" (Demo #2) – 3:45

== Personnel ==
Band

- Brendan B. Brown – lead vocals, guitar, samples, tambourines, shakers
- Peter Brown – drums, backing vocals, turntables
- Mike McCabe – bass guitar, backing vocals
- Shannon Harris – Rhodes piano, clavinet, piano, Hammond organ, tambourines

Other

- Liz Brown – backing vocals
- Kathryn Froggatt – backing vocals
- Philip A. Jimenez – banjo, turntables
- David Froggatt – whistling, kookaburra
- Rakiem Walker – saxophone
- Gerald Thomas – baritone sax
- Michael Lewis – trumpet
- Benjamin Morss – Rhodes piano
- Bendji – timbales

== Charts ==
=== Singles ===
Year	Song	UK Singles	UK Rock
2003	"American in Amsterdam"	59	10
