= The Valentine LP =

Studio album by Wheatus
- Released: August 2, 2013
- Recorded: November 2012 – May 2013
- Genre: Alternative rock
- Length: 44:33
- Label: Montauk Mantis
- Producer: Brendan B. Brown

Wheatus chronology
Pop, Songs & Death (2012)	The Valentine LP (2013)	Live 2015 (2015)

The Valentine LP is the fifth studio album by American rock band Wheatus.

== Background ==
The album is a set of "post-apocalyptic love songs", according to frontman Brendan B. Brown. Brown delved into the concept of "reconstituting society, fighting zombies, and trying to maintain some kind of romantic relationship at the same time." The album's sound is reminiscent of 1970s-era the Who, Rush and AC/DC.

== Release ==
Wheatus released an album sampler for The Valentine LP through YouTube on July 27, 2013, and subsequently released the full tracks between August 14 and September 9. The album was released on August 2, 2013, as digital download (mp3 and FLAC) through the band's website, with a vinyl version shipping in late 2013. The digital version of the album includes a pdf entitled "Valentine Comic", with concept art for the album, depicting a zombie apocalypse love story. The concept art was designed by graphic artist Ecol (Eric Collins).

"Only You" was released as a single on July 6, 2014. The song was a collaboration between Brendan Brown and two members of One Direction, bassist Sandy Beales and drummer Josh Devine. The song came about after One Direction was playing Wheatus' "Teenage Dirtbag" live. In September and October, Wheatus went on a tour of the UK. The Valentine LP was released on CD through Blacktop Records in the UK in 2014 with three bonus tracks: "Only You", a single mix of "Holiday" and an acoustic version of "Only You".

== Track listing ==
All songs written by Brendan B. Brown.

1. "The Fall in Love" – 6:00
2. "Fourteen" – 3:35
3. "Holiday" – 2:59
4. "Break It Don't Buy It" – 3:57
5. "Valentine" – 4:55
6. "Mary Mary Sea Serpent" – 3:55
7. "Marigold Girl" – 4:27
8. "Lady Adelaide" – 3:18
9. "That's True" – 6:51
10. "Love Is Too Expensive" – 4:41

UK CD bonus tracks

11. "Only You" – 3:12
12. "Holiday" (single mix) – 3:22
13. "Only You" (acoustic) – 3:07

== Personnel ==
- Brendan B. Brown – vocals, electric and acoustic guitars
- Matthew Milligan – electric and upright basses
- Kevin Garcia – drums and percussion
- Gabrielle Sterbenz – backing vocals
- Karlie Bruce – backing vocals
- Mark Palmer – keyboards (tracks 1, 2, 4, 7, 10)
- Ken Flagg – keyboards (tracks 3, 5, 7)
- Michael Bellar – keyboards (track 5)
- Liz Brown – backing vocals (track 5)
- Corn Mo – accordion (track 6)
- John N Wlaysweski – guitar solo (track 10)
- Jack Hsu – erhu (track 4)
- Philip A Jimenez – jingle bells (track 4)

All songs produced, arranged and engineered by Brendan B. Brown at Mashed Postudios. Mixed and mix-mastered by Philip A. Jimenez at Gordo Studios, Huntington, NY.
