= Josh Devine =

English drummer

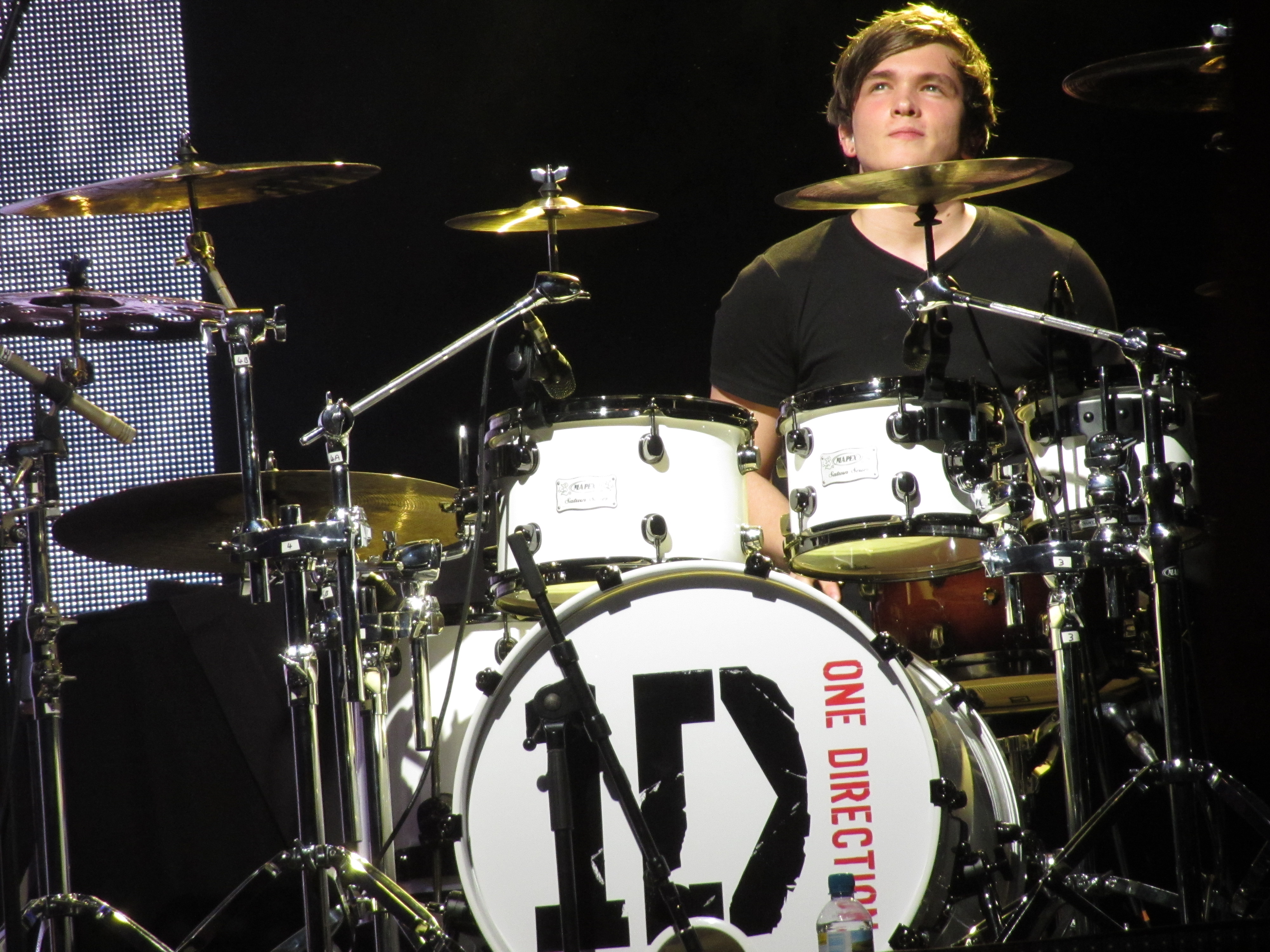
- Josh Devine – One Direction Up All Night Tour

Background information
- Born: Joshua John Devine; 9 July 1991 (age 35); Bournemouth, England
- Genres: Pop; pop rock; electronica
- Occupations: Singer; songwriter; drummer
- Instruments: Drums, vocals, guitar, piano
- Years active: 2011–present

Joshua John Devine (born 9 July 1991) is an English-born American session drummer, singer, and songwriter. He is known for being the live drummer of One Direction.

Devine received his US citizenship in Nashville, Tennessee on January 18, 2023.

== Personal life ==
Devine grew up in Bournemouth, England, but later moved to The Midlands during secondary school. Devine's father Mick was in the '80s rock band Seven growing up, which inspired his musical interests at a young age. Devine began experimenting with drumming at the age of three years, and later got gifted his first drum set from his parents on his fourth birthday.

== Career ==
=== Music ===
In 2011, Devine found out about the audition opportunity for One Direction through a friend of his on Facebook. He was selected on the very first audition, and has since performed with them on every show.

Devine has collaborated with many other acts as well as working as a session drummer. Amongst them, a cover of "Uptown Funk" by Mark Ronson and Bruno Mars alongside Lia Marie Johnson, Jamieboy, and Josh Golden. He later went on to collaborate with singer & songwriter Ollie Green to create the Through The Fire EP in August 2015.

On 1 January 2017 Josh announced the beginning of his new band, Evaride, along with guitarist Hayden Maringer and singer Sean Michael Murray. They released their debut single later that year.

In May 2018 he formed ZFG with guitarist Trev Lukather, vocalist Jules Galli and bassist Sam Porcaro. ZFG debuted with their own material in 2019 and announced some live dates supporting The Winery Dogs in USA and headlining in Europe. In early 2020 the group was renamed "Levara" and Porcaro left the group. Their debut album was launched on May 14, 2021.

The group split up shortly after the release of the album, due to personal conflicts. On February 9, 2026 the group announced via Instagram that they had reformed and were working on new material.

Devine currently works as a session musician, recently as drummer for Nashville based folk group Seaforth and rock singer Robin McAuley.

== Discography ==
=== Extended plays ===
Title	Year	Peak chart positions	
Title	Year	US	US Pop
"Through The Fire"	2015	—	—

=== Music videos ===
Year	Title	Director	Notes
2015	"Here To Stay (feat. Ollie Green)"	John Anthony Villalobos	Produced by Create Studios
2015	"Through The Fire (feat. Ollie Green)"	Chris David	Produced by Create Studios
