= Too Soon Monsoon =

Studio album by Wheatus
- Released: October 18, 2005
- Recorded: April–June 2005
- Genre: Alternative rock
- Length: 50:08
- Label: Montauk Mantis

Wheatus chronology
Live at XM (2004)	Too Soon Monsoon (2005)	Pop, Songs & Death (2009)

Professional ratings
Review scores
Source	Rating
Allmusic	4/5 stars
Melodic	3/5 stars
Splendid	(unfavorable)

Too Soon Monsoon is the third studio album released by American rock band Wheatus. It was released on October 18, 2005 in the United States and on October 24, 2005 in the United Kingdom by the band's own label, Montauk Mantis.

== Track listing ==
1. "Something Good" – 5:18
2. "In the Melody" – 3:22
3. "BMX Bandits" – 3:08
4. "The London Sun" – 4:32
5. "I Am What I Is" – 3:59
6. "The Truth I Tell Myself" – 5:33
7. "Hometown" – 5:30
8. "Desperate Songs" – 3:09
9. "This Island" – 6:04
10. "Who Would Have Thought?" – 3:56
11. "No Happy Ending Tune" – 5:37
- Digital Deluxe Edition Bonus Tracks

12. "BMX Bandits" [Live@XM Radio] – 3:13
13. "The London Sun" [Live@XM Radio] – 4:17

== Personnel ==
- Brendan B. Brown – vocals, lyrics, guitar
- Elizabeth Grace Brown – backing vocals
- Kathryn Elizabeth Froggatt – backing vocals
- Peter Brown – drums, percussion, turntables, backing vocals
- Nicolas DiPierro – bass, backing vocals (track 4)
- Gerald Charles Hoffman keyboards, additional percussion

== Charts ==
=== Singles ===
Year	Song	UK Ind.
2005	"BMX Bandits"	44
