= Chris Jay =

American musician

- Born: Christopher Thomas Jurewicz; Cape May, New Jersey, U.S.
- Genres: Power pop; pop punk; alternative rock
- Occupations: Musician; songwriter; actor; record producer
- Instruments: Vocals; guitar
- Years active: 1997–present
- Website: armyoffreshmen.com

Chris Jay is a musician, songwriter, screenwriter, producer, actor, journalist and podcaster best known as the frontman and founder of the rock band Army of Freshmen and for co-writing and acting in the comedy film The Bet.

== Career ==
=== Musical career ===
Chris Jay was born Chris Jurewicz in Cape May, New Jersey. He attended high school at Lower Cape May Regional where his parents were both music teachers. They also owned and operated a small music store, Mr. J's Music Shop in the North Cape May section of Lower Township, New Jersey which was connected to Jay's childhood home. He formed his first band, Yclept, while still in high school and performed throughout South Jersey including opening for one of his heroes, Arlo Guthrie, a show which the 16-year-old Jay booked and promoted himself. Upon graduation he moved by himself to Ventura, California where he formed the band, Army of Freshmen in 1997. Army of Freshmen are still active and have played over 1,500 shows in 43 states and 11 countries and released 5 full-length albums. Jay himself has been involved in the writing, producing and recording of over 1,500 songs, with several of those appearing in films and on television.

=== Film career ===
Chris Jay and fellow Army of Freshmen member Aaron Goldberg wrote the screenplay for the full-length comedy film The Bet, which was released on July 26, 2016. Jay and Goldberg co-produced the film under their production company, Goldy Jay Productions.

In 2009, Jay was a featured extra in the horror film The Telling. Jay along with other AOF members Aaron Goldberg and Kai Dodson can be seen multiple times in the movie's opening sequence which was filmed at the Playboy Mansion and stars Hugh Hefner's then-girlfriends Holly Madison and Bridget Marquardt of The Girls Next Door.

Jay's work on The Telling led to his being cast in the comedy Beer Pong Saved My Life playing the role of “Frat Boy.” In addition to the acting role, he co wrote the movie's theme song.

Jay appears as an extra in the Las Vegas crowd sequence of the final fight in the sixth Rocky film, Rocky Balboa. Jay is involved in the boxing industry, competing as an amateur and professional, as well as training and managing professional fighters, handling publicity for promotional companies and providing on camera commentary for boxing events.

=== Journalism ===
Jay has been a freelance writer, primarily covering music and sports, for the Ventura-based weekly newspaper, The VC Reporter since 1999. He's interviewed hundreds of artists and his more recent work can be found archived at the paper's website.
