= Teenage Dirtbag =

2000 single by Wheatus

Single by Wheatus

from the album Wheatus
- B-side: "I'd Never Write a Song About You"; "Pretty Girl"; "Hey Mr Brown"; "Sunshine" (remix)
- Released: June 20, 2000
- Recorded: February–March 2000
- Genre: Pop rock; power pop; alternative pop; alternative rock; pop-punk
- Length: 4:07
- Label: Columbia
- Songwriter: Brendan B. Brown
- Producers: Wheatus; Philip A. Jimenez

Wheatus singles chronology
"Teenage Dirtbag" (2000)	"A Little Respect" (2001)

Music video
- "Teenage Dirtbag" on YouTube

Alternative cover
- UK single cover

"Teenage Dirtbag" is a song by American rock band Wheatus. It was released on June 20, 2000, serving as the band's debut single and as the lead single from their self-titled debut album (2000). The song was written by guitarist and vocalist Brendan B. Brown and was inspired by a childhood experience of his.

In the United States, "Teenage Dirtbag" peaked at number seven on the Billboard Modern Rock Tracks chart. It was also successful worldwide, especially in Australia, where it spent four weeks at number one, ended 2000 as the country's second-best-selling single, and received a triple platinum sales certification. Elsewhere, the song reached number one in Austria and Flanders and peaked at number two in the United Kingdom, where it was certified quadruple platinum in 2024. It had sold five million copies worldwide as of 2014.

== Background ==
"Teenage Dirtbag" is about a childhood experience that guitarist and vocalist Brendan B. Brown had. In a 2012 interview with Tone Deaf, he said:

It came from the summer of 1984 on Long Island, when I was 10 years old. That summer in the woods behind my house, there was a Satanic, drug-induced ritual teen homicide that went down; and the kid who did it was called Ricky Kasso, and he was arrested wearing an AC/DC T-shirt. That made all the papers, and the television, obviously; and here I was, 10 years old, walking around with a case full of AC/DC and Iron Maiden and Metallica – and all the parents and the teachers and the cops thought I was some kind of Satan worshipper. So that's the backdrop for that song.

Brown also added that the song's sing-along chorus remains an act of defiance: "so when I sing: 'I'm just a teenage dirtbag', I'm effectively saying: 'Yeah, fuck you if you don't like it. Just because I like AC/DC doesn't mean I'm a devil worshipper, and you're an idiot.' That's where it comes from." In the same interview, regarding the possible reasons for its continued success, Brown recalled his father's words: "Every teenager has to go through that 'being an outsider' thing, at least a little bit. So that story is still the same for people, even if it's thirty years after I went through it."

The song's vocals are all performed by Brown, including a segment in falsetto. When the group arranged a joint tour with MC Frontalot, MC Frontalot contributed a nerdcore rap verse to the song, as did MC Lars.

The song grew to become a veritable outsider anthem and Wheatus' biggest hit.

== Critical reception ==
Ayhan Sahin of Billboard magazine reviewed the song favorably, calling it a "gritty, on-the-edge track" and saying that its "keen melody, inventive production, and cool lyric about those who have felt like underlings during high school will entice listeners who prefer hanging out behind the gym with a smoke to Latin club." He went on to say that it "stands strongly on its own as an emphatic anthem and a song many teens will be proud to push hard from their car speakers." In June 2013, Australian radio station Triple J ranked "Teenage Dirtbag" as number 82 on their "Twenty Years of Triple J's Hottest 100". The song was ranked number 69 on the "Top 100 Greatest Pop Songs of All Time" countdown by British music channel The Hits.

== Commercial performance ==
In the United Kingdom, the song peaked at number two on the UK singles chart, staying there for two weeks and kept off the top spot by Atomic Kitten's "Whole Again". It spent four weeks at number one in Australia and also topped the charts in Austria and Flanders. Despite being a chart success in the UK, Europe and Australia, it failed to appear on the US Billboard Hot 100, but it did peak at number seven on the Billboard Modern Rock Tracks chart. In March 2011, the song returned to the UK Singles Chart at number 43 and climbed to number 35 the following week, nearly 11 years after its initial release. Bigtop40.com suggested that this was due to a promotion on iTunes. The song has re-entered the top 40 of the UK Singles Chart on multiple occasions, including in March 2011, April 2012, and November 2023. By 2014 the track had sold five million copies worldwide.

== Censorship ==
The second verse of the song originally began with the lyrics, "Her boyfriend's a dick / He brings a gun to school". Radio edits usually omitted the word dick or edited it so that it sounded like the less offensive prick, and most modern versions of the song have the words gun to school covered by turntable scratching sounds. Some versions also edit the lines "And he'd simply kick / My ass if he knew the truth", to remove the word ass. When asked why gun is frequently censored, Brown stated that it is because the day he presented the song to the band's record label was around the time of the first anniversary of the Columbine High School massacre. The song was re-recorded and re-released in 2020, retaining the original lines.

== Music video ==
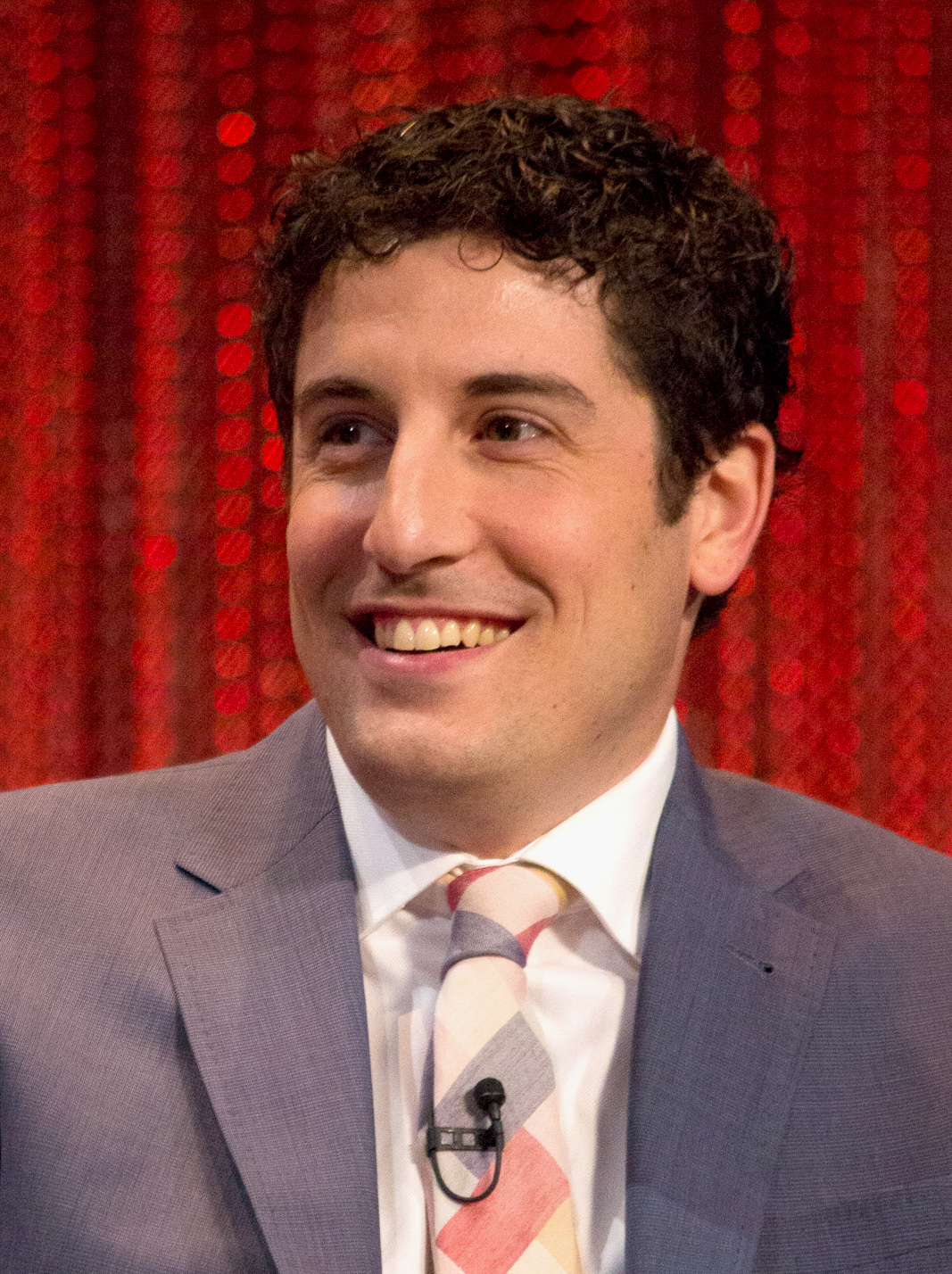
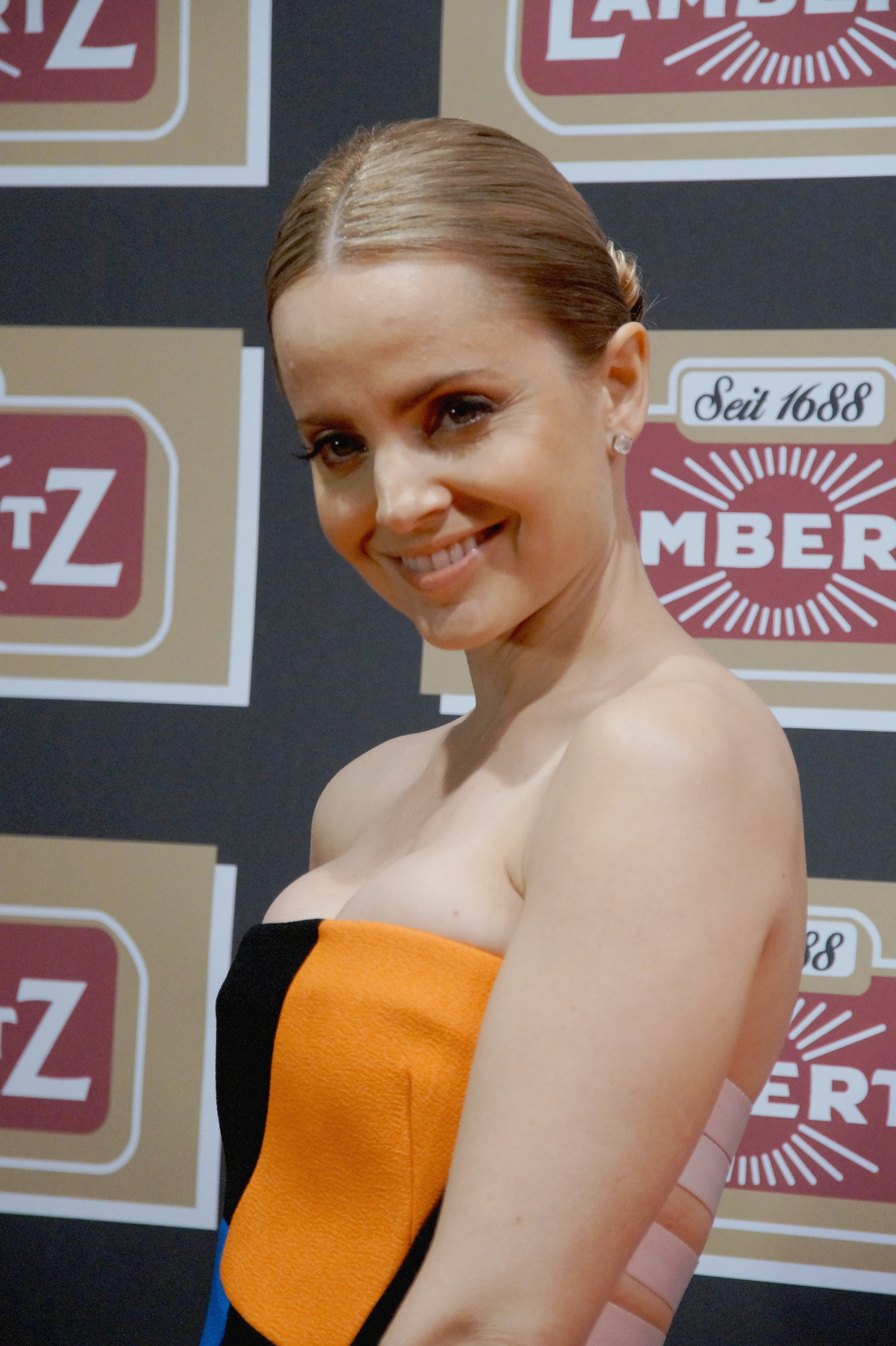
The main characters in the video were played by Jason Biggs (left, pictured in 2014) and Mena Suvari (right, pictured in 2016).

The music video for "Teenage Dirtbag", directed by Jeff Gordon, is based on the 2000 film Loser, which the song is featured in, and tells a different story from the film based on the song's lyrics. Jason Biggs plays a nerdy character and Mena Suvari is the love interest who unexpectedly invites the protagonist to an Iron Maiden concert, and in the end scene they dance together on prom night.

In some cases, the beginning and the end of the video were deleted: The full version of the video begins with Biggs falling asleep while doing his homework and ends with a large glitter ball falling from the ceiling and striking him on the head. He then wakes up, revealing his brief romance with Suvari to have been all a dream. The video was nominated for Best Video at the Kerrang! Awards.

== Rerecording ==
As the multitrack masters to "Teenage Dirtbag" were lost, Wheatus rerecorded it in 2016. Brown said they felt "compelled to recreate them so that, if for no other reason, we could own a copy". Wheatus took lengths to rerecord every element, including the distorted snare drum caused by a recording error in the original. Brown estimated that it took two years to recreate the song.

== Other versions ==
=== Sega Bodega cover ===
In May 2020, Sega Bodega released a cover of "Teenage Dirtbag" as part of his Reestablishing Connection EP.

=== Christmas version ===
In October 2023, Wheatus released a Christmas-themed version of "Teenage Dirtbag" titled "Christmas Dirtbag", which was included on their Just a Dirtbag Christmas extended play. The lyrics describe someone who believed that Santa Claus had forgotten about them. An animated music video honoring Wheatus's recently deceased dog, Buddy, was released to accompany "Christmas Dirtbag".

=== Cat Burns cover ===
In November 2024, English singer-songwriter Cat Burns released a cover of "Teenage Dirtbag", which had been part of the set list for her "Early Twenties" tour.

=== Cavetown and Chloe Moriondo cover ===
In October 2021, English singer-songwriter Cavetown and American singer-songwriter Chloe Moriondo released a cover of "Teenage Dirtbag". It was followed by an acoustic version in November 2021.

== Track listings ==
Australian CD single

1. "Teenage Dirtbag" – 4:01
2. "I'd Never Write a Song About You" – 3:38
3. "Pretty Girl" – 4:29

UK CD single

1. "Teenage Dirtbag" (explicit album version) – 4:01
2. "I'd Never Write a Song About You" – 3:38
3. "Hey Mr Brown" (with club audience) – 2:22
4. "Teenage Dirtbag" (CD extra video) – 3:57

UK cassette single

1. "Teenage Dirtbag" (explicit album version) – 4:01
2. "I'd Never Write a Song About You" – 3:38
3. "Hey Mr Brown" (with club audience) – 2:22

European CD single

1. "Teenage Dirtbag" (explicit album version) – 4:01
2. "I'd Never Write a Song About You" – 3:38

European maxi-CD single

1. "Teenage Dirtbag" (explicit album version) – 4:01
2. "I'd Never Write a Song About You" – 3:38
3. "Sunshine" (remix) – 2:52

== Charts ==
=== Weekly charts ===
Chart (2000–2001)	Peak position
Australia (ARIA)	1
Austria (Ö3 Austria Top 40)	1
Belgium (Ultratop 50 Flanders)	1
Belgium (Ultratop 50 Wallonia)	3
Denmark (Tracklisten)	6
Europe (Eurochart Hot 100)	3
Finland (Suomen virallinen lista)	9
France (SNEP)	62
Germany (GfK)	2
Ireland (IRMA)	2
Italy (FIMI)	38
Netherlands (Dutch Top 40)	13
Netherlands (Single Top 100)	14
New Zealand (Recorded Music NZ)	27
Norway (VG-lista)	6
Poland Airplay (Music & Media)	10
Scottish Singles Sales (Official Charts)	2
Sweden (Sverigetopplistan)	2
Switzerland (Schweizer Hitparade)	3
UK Singles (Official Charts)	2
US Bubbling Under Hot 100 (Billboard)	24
US Modern Rock Tracks (Billboard)	7

=== Year-end charts ===
Chart (2000)	Position
Australia (ARIA)	2
US Modern Rock Tracks (Billboard)	41

Chart (2001)	Position
Australia (ARIA)	28
Austria (Ö3 Austria Top 40)	4
Belgium (Ultratop 50 Flanders)	2
Belgium (Ultratop 50 Wallonia)	22
Europe (Eurochart Hot 100)	13
Germany (Media Control)	7
Ireland (IRMA)	5
Netherlands (Dutch Top 40)	65
Netherlands (Single Top 100)	88
Sweden (Hitlistan)	19
Switzerland (Schweizer Hitparade)	22
UK Singles (OCC)	9

=== Decade-end charts ===
Chart (2000–2009)	Position
Australia (ARIA)	17
UK Singles (OCC)	42

== Certifications ==
Region	Certification	Certified units/sales
Australia (ARIA)	3× Platinum	210,000^{^}
Austria (IFPI Austria)	Platinum	50,000^{*}
Belgium (BRMA)	Platinum	50,000^{*}
Denmark (IFPI Danmark)	Gold	45,000^{‡}
Germany (BVMI)	2× Platinum	1,200,000^{‡}
New Zealand (RMNZ)	5× Platinum	150,000^{‡}
Norway (IFPI Norway)	Gold	
Sweden (GLF)	Platinum	30,000^{^}
Switzerland (IFPI Switzerland)	Gold	25,000^{^}
United Kingdom (BPI)	5× Platinum	3,000,000^{‡}
Summaries
Worldwide	—	5,000,000
^{*} Sales figures based on certification alone.^{^} Shipments figures based on certification alone.^{‡} Sales+streaming figures based on certification alone.

== Release history ==
Region	Date	Format(s)	Label(s)	Ref.
United States	June 20, 2000	Alternative radio	Columbia	
United States	June 26, 2000	Mainstream rock; active rock radio	Columbia	
United States	July 10, 2000	Hot adult contemporary radio	Columbia	
United States	August 1, 2000	Contemporary hit radio	Columbia	
United Kingdom	February 5, 2001	CD; cassette	Columbia	
