= Army of Freshmen =

American rock band

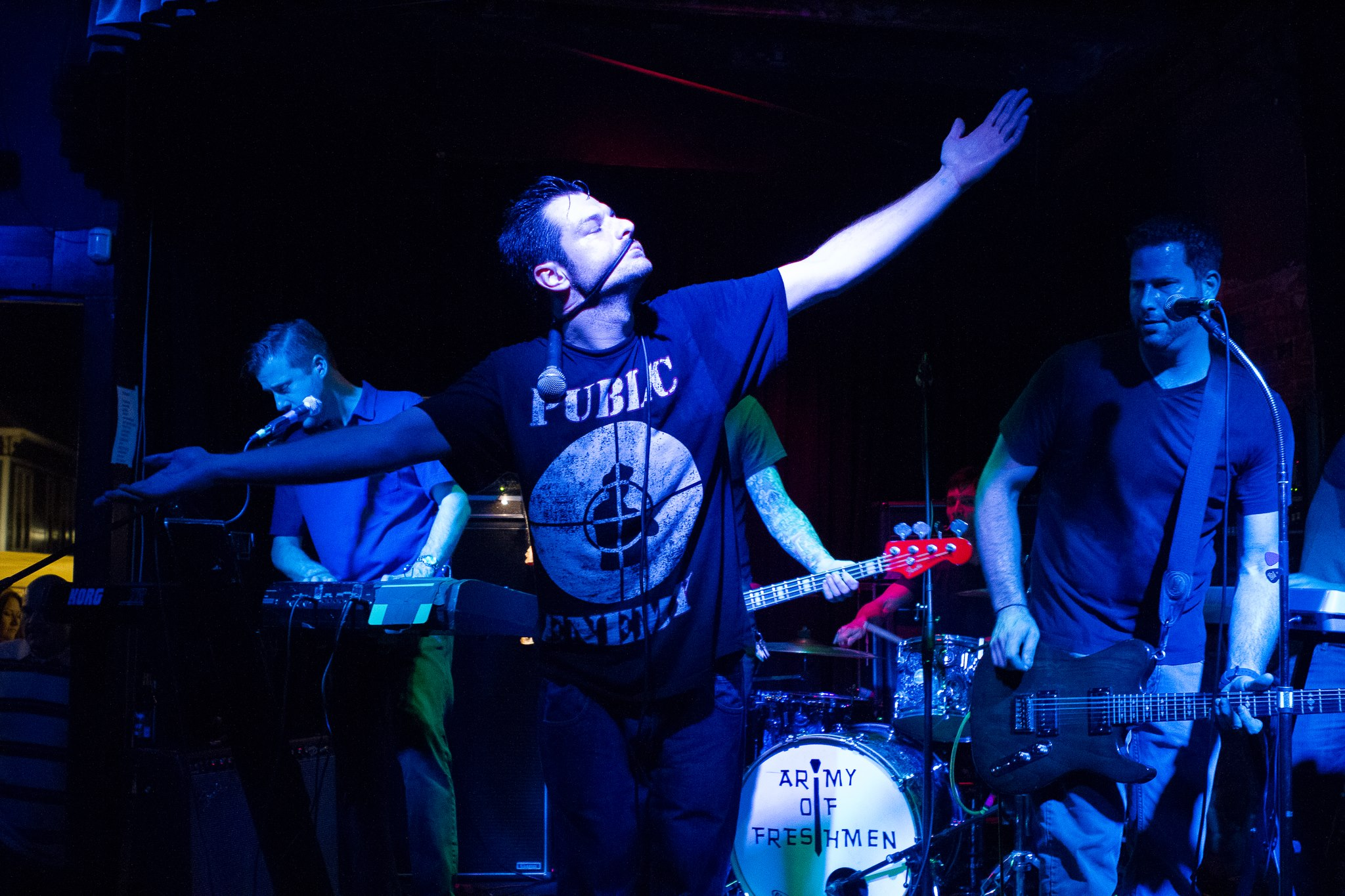
- Army of Freshmen performing live in 2013.

Background information
- Origin: Ventura, California, U.S.
- Genres: Power pop; pop punk; alternative rock
- Years active: 1997–present
- Labels: Blue Hand; 33rd Street; Brand New Hero; Arkive; French Hours
- Members: Chris Jay; Aaron Goldberg; Owen Bucey; Dan Clark; Kai Dodson; Mike Milligan
- Past members: James Schlachter; Mike Rini; Oné Nielsen; Jon Blackburn
- Website: armyoffreshmen.com

Army of Freshmen is an American rock band formed in Ventura, California in 1997. They have performed over 1,500 shows in 13 countries and 43 US states. The band have released three albums and four singles since their first release in 2001. They have also signed with multiple record companies, including Blue Hand Records and 33rd Street Records.

During time on tour, the band was introduced to Bowling for Soup, and both bands later became the co-creators of the Get Happy Tour that launched in 2006.

Due to the 2008 financial crisis, the band suffered with finding a record label that would sign them. However, they took matters into their own hands with seeking additional crowd funded projects including acoustic EPs, writing and film production.

== History ==
=== Early years (1997–2000) ===
Following his graduation from Lower Cape May Regional High School in Cape May, New Jersey, Chris Jay moved by himself to Ventura, California with the goal of starting a band. Having written hundreds of songs, Jay started out playing solo acoustic at local open mics and coffeehouses.

Jay officially formed Army of Freshmen at the end of 1997 with Owen Bucey, Aaron Goldberg, Dan Clark, Oné Nielsen, Mike Rini and Jon Blackburn all of whom he met at a Ventura coffeehouse he performed at regularly. Jay's new bandmates were all recent graduates of Buena High School and Ventura High School. The band initially performed as Chris Jay and the Army of Freshmen but after a few months of local shows, they began going by just Army of Freshmen. Initially Goldberg and Clark played trumpet and trombone while Jay played guitar but the band moved Clark to keyboard and Goldberg to guitar which created the dual keyboard-driven pop punk that the band is known for. In 1998, the band release their first CD, Ribcage Radio. By 2000, the band went on their first tour, 2 weeks on the east coast, in the same minivan Jay left home in. The tour was booked completely independent of any manager, label or agent.

=== Army of Freshmen (2001–2003) ===
On the strength of a 3-song demo and a large Ventura area fan base, in 2000, the band was discovered by music manager, Rod Ensminger, who signed them to his label, Blue Hand Records. In 2001 the band released their self-titled debut which was produced by Jay Ferguson, a member of the 60's rock band Spirit.

To support their debut full-length release, Army of Freshmen toured in the summer of 2001 on the Moto Music Madness Tour, a freestyle motocross meets music tour that played over 50 dates across the USA including a handful of dates on the Warped Tour.

At the end of 2002, Nielsen left the band and was replaced by Kai Dodson, a Ventura musician who was close friends with the band. Around the same time, the band was signed to a label in Japan who released their self-titled album in that country in 2003. To support the release Army of Freshmen was invited to play Summersonic, a major music festival in Japan alongside major artists like Radiohead and The Doors. This led to Army of Freshmen's first international attention when, despite being the least known act at the festival, their set received rave reviews in the Japanese music press.

While on a few random dates of the 2003 Warped Tour, Army of Freshmen met Bowling for Soup who would become close friends and collaborators. Bowling For Soup invited Army of Freshmen on their 2003 fall tour. Initially just booked to be on a few shows, Bowling for Soup, insisted that Army of Freshmen stay on for the entire tour, an act that Jay described as, "An above and a beyond act of kindness that totally changed our band's career."

=== Beg, Borrow, Steal (2004–2005) ===
The band signed with 33rd Street Records, an indie label which was owned by Tower Records and entered the studio to record their second album, Beg, Borrow, Steal in late 2003. The album included the single "Get Um Up," which spent 5 weeks in the top 20 on the U.S. Alternative radio specialty charts.

Following the release of Beg, Borrow, Steal in 2004, the band returned to Japan supporting The Living End.

While on the Warped Tour in 2004, drummer Mike Rini left the band abruptly at one of the tour's Canadian dates. Mike Milligan, a drummer from Chicago whose previous band had played several shows with Army of Freshmen, joined shortly thereafter.

After the Warped Tour, the band toured the United Kingdom for the first time. A compilation by Brand New Hero Records featuring Army of Freshmen songs, entitled Casino Chips and Sunset Strips, was released in the UK to coincide with the tour. The tour ended with Army of Freshmen being asked to open for Bowling for Soup for three of that band's tour dates in the United Kingdom.

In 2005 the band did a headlining summer tour still in support of Beg, Borrow, Steal and returned to the United Kingdom that fall for a sold-out tour opening for Bowling for Soup. In support of the tour, they released an EP, At the End Of the Day, which was recorded in Texas and produced by Jaret Reddick of Bowling for Soup.

=== Under the Radar (2006–2007) ===
In 2006, the band released their third album, Under the Radar, which featured the single, "Juliet". The dodgeball themed video received moderate play on United Kingdom music channels like Kerrang and Scuzz TV. The record would be their first with their longtime producer, Jay Ruston.

In the summer of 2006, Army of Freshmen and Bowling for Soup created and appeared on the Get Happy Tour, a popular package tour that traveled the United States in 2006 and 2007, the United Kingdom twice in 2007 and also did a short European run in 2017. The tour featured fan interaction events and a family-friendly show. Other bands that appeared alongside AOF and BFS on the various Get Happy Tours included The Bloodhound Gang, Zebrahead, Wheatus, Son of Dork, Punchline, Lucky Boys Confusion, Quiet Drive and Melee.

2007 proved to be Army of Freshmen busiest year with multiple tours in the United Kingdom, their first UK festival appearance at the Download Festival, their first trip to mainland Europe supporting Reel Big Fish and the previously mentioned Get Happy Tours which played to sold-out venues in the United Kingdom.

=== Above The Atmosphere (2008–2009) ===
The band's fourth album, Above the Atmosphere, was released in 2008 and the single "No One's Famous" again received airplay on UK Television. The band did their first ever headline tours of the United Kingdom in the spring and fall and again appeared at the Download Festival. They did a headline tour that summer in the United States.

After years of touring independently and surviving primarily on merchandise sales, just as Army of Freshmen was set to sign to major label Universal Republic Records, the global economic crisis hit. The label froze all signings for the remainder of the year and the A&R man who was negotiating the deal was laid off shortly thereafter. In addition, a new indie label the band had just begun working with folded suddenly leaving the band responsible for debt the label incurred in the band's name.

In May 2009, the band toured China for the first time where they played to the biggest crowds of their career appearing at the Midi Festival and Zebra Festival where they were the only artist from the US to perform.

=== Close Encounter EP (2010–2011) ===
The band released the Close Encounter EP in 2010. The EP was available for download for a pay-what-you-like model. The video for the EP's single, "Body Parts" received minor airplay on United Kingdom video channels. The band returned to the United Kingdom for a short headline tour and an appearance at the Sonisphere Festival at Knebworth, England.

In the spring of 2011, Army of Freshmen opened the main stage at the Groezrock Festival in Belgium. In addition to Groezrock, they performed at the Artefacts Festival in France, the Paaspop Festival in the Netherlands and headlined a week of shows in the United Kingdom.

At the end of 2011, the band returned to the United Kingdom for their 10th visit, this time touring with Zebrahead.

=== Happy To Be Alive (2012–2016) ===
The band's fifth record, Happy To Be Alive, was self-released in 2012 and was crowd-funded. Fans who contributed to the making of the record received an acoustic EP, Campfire Classics. Despite Happy To Be Alive receiving the best reviews of their career which cited the record's lyrical maturity and less pop-punk direction, the record failed to sell well or receive much attention outside of the band's most hardcore fans. Army of Freshmen only toured once in support of the record, with a 2014 tour in the United Kingdom with Lit. After the Lit tour, the band went on hiatus for the first time since their inception, though it was not officially announced. During this time, band members engaged in a variety of side projects, including Jay and Goldberg writing, co-producing, and releasing the independent comedy film, The Bet.

=== Continued activity (2017–present) ===
In a surprise announcement on September 22, 2017, Army of Freshmen released the news that they would be celebrating their 20th Anniversary in February 2018 with the return of the Get Happy Tour in the United Kingdom. Army of Freshmen once again joined Bowling for Soup and special guests, The Aquabats for the first Get Happy Tour in 11 years. The band also played an anniversary show in their hometown (Ventura, CA) in October 2018.

In late 2019 and early 2020, the band released three new singles, "Well May Her World Go Round," "Everything is Beautiful," and "Promise." Recorded by John Sveiven at Arkive Studios in Ventura, these recordings marked the first release of new Army of Freshmen music since 2012's Happy to Be Alive.

In April 2022, the band opened for Nerf Herder for two Californian dates. On September 14, 2024, the band performed a 25th anniversary show in Ventura.

== Other ventures ==
Active Side Projects

Kai Dodson currently performs and records with the indie rock band, Curtsy who have released two full-length records.

Owen Bucey occasionally performs solo and is releasing his debut solo EP in 2018.

Chris Jay and Dan Clark host the bi-weekly podcast, Fresh Talk which covers music, movies, TV and current events. Other Army of Freshmen members frequently guest on the podcast.

Inactive Side Projects

Along with several other Ventura area musicians, Army of Freshmen performed occasionally as Big Band, a 12 piece, double drummer cover band. Big Band was joined onstage at performance by Chuck D of Public Enemy who performed Bring The Noise with the band in 2011.

Kai Dodson, Aaron Goldberg and Owen Bucey formed the band, The Calamity, a pop rock band which had Goldberg playing drums and Dodson playing guitar and Bucey on lead vocals. The band released two full-length records before disbanding.

In Army of Freshmen's early days, Jay, Goldberg and Bucey performed in a parody hillbilly band, The Anal Retentive Mississippi Scavenger Hunt.

Army of Freshmen wrote several parody reggae songs and created a band, S-Dub which performed at least once.

Film

Chris Jay and Aaron Goldberg wrote the screenplay and co-produced the raunchy comedy film, The Bet which was released in 2016. Army of Freshmen members can be seen throughout the film as extras. Jay appears in the film as the character, Scott Quaker. Several Army of Freshmen songs are on the film's soundtrack and Jay and Goldberg wrote and performed several original comedy songs for the film.

Jay and Goldberg wrote the screenplay, Wedding or Not, which is in pre-production and scheduled to begin filming in the summer and fall of 2020.

Jay and Goldberg wrote and produced a pilot for an animated adult cartoon show parodying the life of Frank Sinatra, The Spank Finatra Show. They recorded several parody songs for the show.

Army of Freshmen wrote and performed the original theme song for the children's film, Adventures of a Teenage Dragon Slayer.

Army of Freshmen wrote and performed the original theme song for the indie comedy film, Beer Pong Saved My Life which Jay had a small cameo in.

Members of Army of Freshmen can be seen in the background of the opening sequence of the indie horror movie, The Telling as party goers at the Playboy Mansion.

Chris Jay wrote the treatment to the Bowling For Soup video, High School Never Ends and Army of Freshmen appear in the video.

Production

Chris Jay and Aaron Goldberg have produced and co-written with several artists in different genres including Adam Mcdonough, Delaney Gibson, Tom Oconnor, Sarah Ashleigh, Michelle Dawn Mooney, Jeff Hershey and The Heartbeats, Narrowcast, Exit4, Lost, Ten Four and Out, New Liberty, Albright, AMFX, Plunket and more.

Beach Boys Lawsuit

Chris Jay is a frequent contributor to the VC Reporter, a weekly newspaper in print and online in Ventura County and has interviewed hundreds of artists. In 2003 he was sued for 10 million dollars by Mike Love of the Beach Boys over an article he wrote on Love and his fronting current line up of the Beach Boys despite having no original members. The case never went to trial and was settled out of court, but all the members of Army of Freshmen had to give depositions during the discovery period of the case. Most Army of Freshmen fans and even Beach Boys fans are unaware that the lawsuit ever existed as it was settled out of court by before any media was made aware of the suit.

== Band members ==
Current members

- Chris Jay - vocals
- Aaron Goldberg - guitar, vocals
- Owen Bucey - keyboard, vocals
- Dan Clark - keyboard, mini moog
- Kai Dodson - bass
- Mike Milligan - drums

Former members

- James Schlacter - drums (Happy To Be Alive)
- Mike Rini - drums (Self Titled, Beg, Borrow, Steal)
- Oné Nielsen - bass (Self Titled)
- Jon Blackburn - drums (early shows)

== Discography ==
- Ribcage Radio (1998)
- Army of Freshmen (2001)
- Beg, Borrow, Steal (2004)
- At the End of the Day EP (2005)
- Under the Radar (2006)
- Above The Atmosphere (2008)
- Close Encounter EP (2010)
- Happy To Be Alive (2012)
- Acoustic EP: Volume 1 (2019)
