= Don Grierson (music executive) =

British music industry executive (d. 2019)

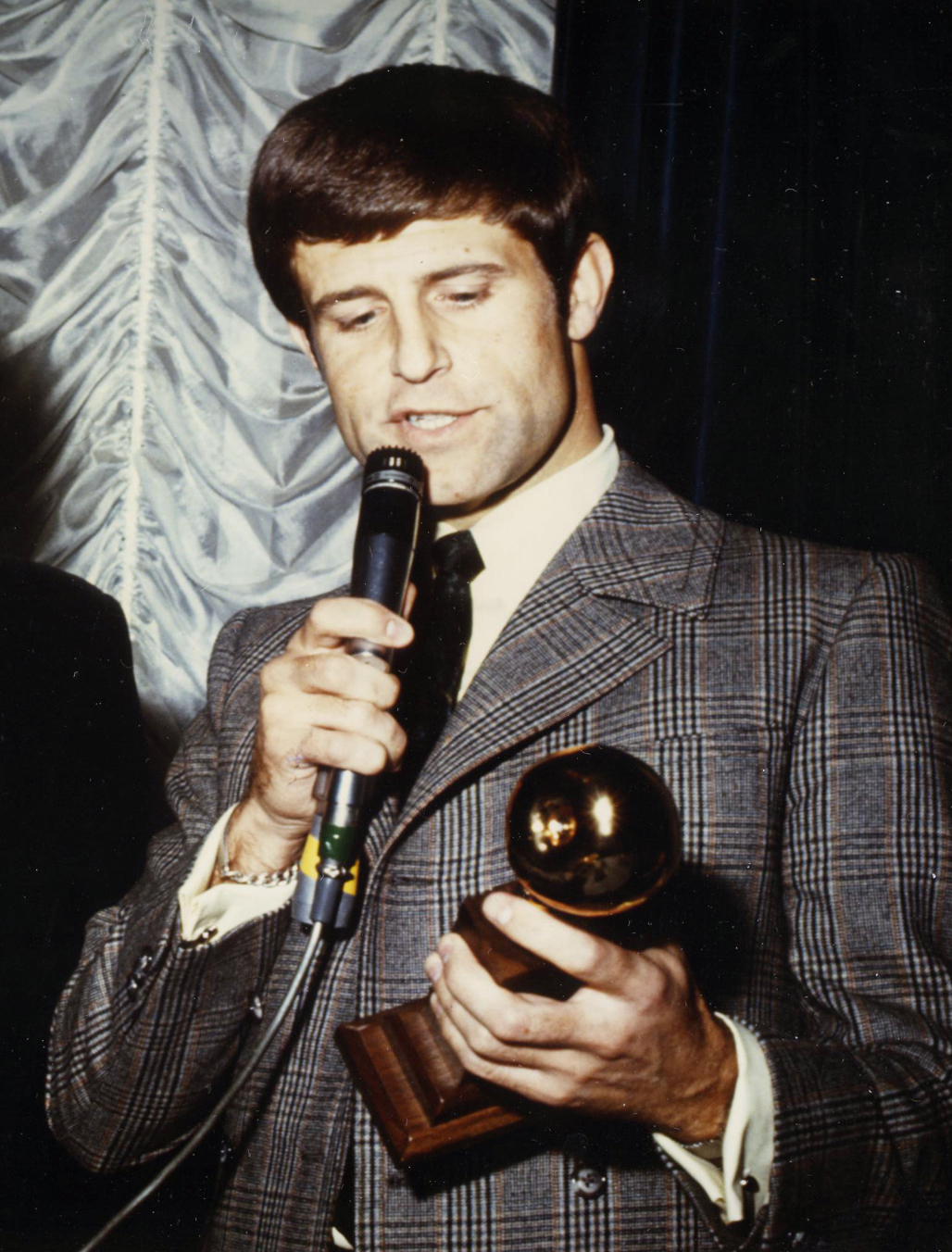
- Grierson accepting the Golden Apple Award in 1968
- Born: 1941 or 1942; Bradford, Yorkshire, England
- Died: 5 January 2019 (aged 77)
- Occupation: Music industry executive
- Years active: 1964–2019
- Website: dongrierson.com

Don Grierson (30 August 1941 – 5 January 2019) was a British-born music industry executive best known for receiving the Golden Apple Award from the Beatles and signing Celine Dion to her first US recording contract.

== Early life ==
Don Grierson was born in Bradford, Yorkshire, England and grew up in the small town of Dubbo, New South Wales, Australia. He was born to Monica Linden, a novelist and Leslie, a department store manager. After the war years, Grierson, his parents and younger brother immigrated to Australia, where he attended a public school until he was 16 years old.

After leaving school, Grierson held several local job positions that would eventually lead to his main career. He attended a small radio school in Sydney, Australia for six months. Grierson befriended the DJ of his hometown radio station and was later hired as a junior announcer and DJ there. During Grierson's four year employment at the station, he created and held the music director position to emphasize the importance of music in his community.

Grierson also worked with a local band, The Saints (not to be confused with the later, more famous Australian band), in his extra time, acting as manager, driver and roadie. The band's gigs mainly consisted of small events that were similar to community dances.

== Career ==
=== Early career ===
Originally a disc jockey at the age of 18, Grierson began his US music industry career by doing record promotions for various labels, including Capitol, Apple, Chess/Checker/Cadet and MGM Records.

Once Grierson, a fanatic lover of all types of music and particularly actual record labels, moved to the United States, he found a job at a one-stop record store where he was exposed to many artists and labels that he had been distanced from. A year later, Grierson obtained his first promotion opportunity at independent record distributor, Record Merchandising, where he covered Southern California for two years. After six months in the U.S. Marine Reserves, Grierson was hired and spent four years as the West Coast Promotion Manager for Capitol Records.

=== Apple Records and the Beatles ===
As the West Coast promotions manager for Capitol Records, Grierson had the opportunity to work on the promotion of the Beatles' releases in the United States. Grierson was instrumental in the promotion of all of the Beatles' albums and singles from 1966 to 1969 and helped contribute to the band's success.

On 31 October 1968, Grierson received the Golden Apple Award for his outstanding promotion of the initial launch of four simultaneous Apple Records singles. Known as "Our First Four", the singles were the Beatles' "Hey Jude", Mary Hopkin's "Those Were the Days", Jackie Lomax's "Sour Milk Sea" and the Black Dyke Mills Band's "Thingummybob". The award was presented personally by George Harrison and was the only Golden Apple Award ever presented by Apple Records.

=== Discovering Celine Dion ===
From 1970 to 1974, Grierson was the A&R Coordinator, West Coast, for RCA Records. In 1974, he returned to Capitol Records, as Manager, International Promotion and A&R. His first signing in that role was Little River Band, from Australia. In 1976, he was promoted to head Capitol's Merchandising and Advertising Department.

In 1978, Grierson was promoted to Vice President, Head of A&R of Capitol Records' newly formed second label, EMI America Records. During his time with EMIA, Grierson worked with a wide range of artists, including Michael Johnson, Kim Carnes, Sheena Easton, Kate Bush, Cliff Richard, J. Gells Band, Dottie West and Kenny Rogers.

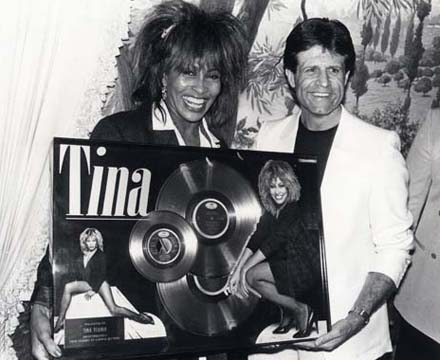
Grierson with Tina Turner

In 1982, Grierson returned to Capitol Records as the Vice President, Head of A&R. There, Grierson signed and helped guide acts including Heart (He found four of Heart's Top 10 singles on their first Capitol album), Joe Cocker, Freddie Jackson, Melba Moore, Melissa Morgan (found her number one R&B single "Do Me Baby") Steve Vai, Megadeth, W.A.S.P., and George Clinton. Grierson assisted in the careers of artists such as Tina Turner, Bob Seger, Anne Murray, The Motels, Duran Duran, The Power Station, Crowded House, Poison and The Smithereens.

In 1987, Grierson left Capitol Records and accepted the position of Senior Vice President, Head of A&R for Epic Records. (Then CBS Records, later to become Sony Music), based in New York City. Sony Canada, was looking to sign and promote Celine Dion via an American record label and presented her to Columbia Records and Epic Records. While Columbia passed on the artist, Grierson believed in her potential and offered to release her on Epic Records. Her single, “Where Does My Heart Beat Now” reached No. 4 in January 1991.

At Epic, Grierson worked closely with Cheap Trick and found their number one single "The Flame". Grierson was also involved with established artists Gloria Estefan, Cyndi Lauper and The Jacksons. He and his A&R staff signed acts such as Living Colour, Indigo Girls, Allman Brothers Band, Alice Cooper, Social Distortion, Firehouse, Suicidal Tendencies, Front 242, Ottmar Liebert and Joe Satriani. Grierson also directed label supervision for the soundtracks of feature films: Hook (Universal Pictures, Steven Spielberg, dir.), Bugsy (TriStar Pictures, Barry Levinson, dir.), Tap (TriStar Pictures, Nick Castle, dir.), Queens Logic (New Visions Pictures, Steve Rash, dir.) and Iron Eagle (TriStar Pictures, Sidney J. Furie, dir.).

=== Drive Entertainment ===
In 1993, Grierson co-founded Drive Entertainment, "a company with emphasis on classic artists and niche market catalog exploitation". The company re-packaged, re-mastered and created liner notes for more than 140 albums by artists such as Billie Holiday, Count Basie, Duke Ellington, Glenn Miller, Coleman Hawkins, and Charlie Parker.

=== Grierson Consulting ===
In 1998, Grierson re-entered the mainstream music business to run his own independent consultant company, working both in the United States and overseas. Grierson has worked with many up and coming artists including Tara Macri, Michael Sullivan, Danielle Taylor, Amy Sky, Molly Gutman and others. Grierson executive produced an album with former American Idol contestant Jon Peter Lewis, as well as executive producing a major album project for Vietnamese superstar, Yenn. He consulted with developing artists (including John Peter Lewis, Tara Macri, Michael Sullivan, Danielle Taylor, Molly Gutman and Anika Paris) managers and small labels.

Grierson also worked as a music supervisor for independent films, was on the board of advisors for MusicBizPro, India and Artistsintersect.com. His consulting work was also profiled in the book Making Your Mark In Music/ Stage Performance Secrets written by Anika Paris.

Grierson was a long time voting member of NARAS/The Grammys.

=== Other work ===
Grierson was also the co-author of the book It All Begins with the Music: Developing Successful Artists and Careers for the New Music Business, along with the veteran music journalist Dan Kimpel. The book was published by Cengage Learning in March 2009. It featured interviews with artists, managers and executives who discuss how to make an impact in today's music business. The book provided an examination of the new methods by which recording artists are discovered, developed, and nurtured in the modern music industry.

Grierson was an instructor at the Musicians Institute's College of Contemporary Music in Los Angeles, California.

== Death ==
Don Grierson died on 5 January 2019, at the age of 77.
