= Lou Bega discography =

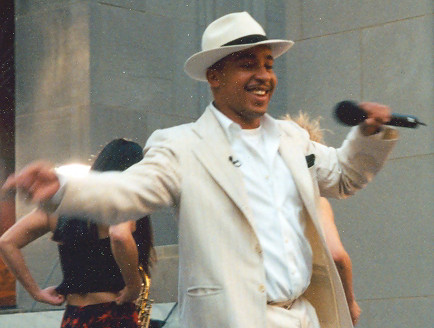
- Studio albums: 6
- Compilation albums: 4
- Singles: 17
- Music videos: 18
- Promotional singles: 3

This is the discography of German singer Lou Bega.

== Albums ==
=== Studio albums ===
Title	Album details	Peak chart positions										Certifications
Title	Album details	GER	AUS	AUT	CAN	FIN	FRA	NOR	SWI	UK	US	Certifications
A Little Bit of Mambo	Released: 19 July 1999; Label: Lautstark, BMG, RCA; Format: CD, LP, cassette, digital download	3	19	1	1	1	8	3	1	50	3	BVMI: Gold; ARIA: Platinum; IFPI AUT: Gold; IFPI SWI: Platinum; MC: 5× Platinum; RIAA: 3× Platinum; SNEP: 2× Gold
Ladies and Gentlemen	Released: 28 May 2001; Label: BMG; Format: CD, LP, cassette, digital download	54	—	31	—	—	109	—	23	—	—	
Lounatic	Released: 10 May 2005; Label: DA, Big; Format: CD, LP, digital download	—	—	—	—	—	—	—	—	—	—	
Free Again	Released: 21 May 2010; Label: DA; Format: CD, digital download	—	—	—	—	—	—	—	78	—	—	
A Little Bit of 80s	Released: 28 June 2013; Label: Sony Music; Format: CD, digital download	—	—	—	—	—	—	—	—	—	—	
90s Cruiser	Released: 27 August 2021; Label: Universal Music; Format: CD, digital download	91	—	—	—	—	—	—	—	—	—	
"—" denotes a recording that did not chart or was not released in that territory.

=== Compilation albums ===
- King of Mambo (2002)
- Mambo Mambo – The Best of Lou Bega (2004)
- Beautiful World – A Little Collection of Lou Bega's Best (2013)
- Best of – Seine größten Hits (2016)

== Singles ==
Title	Year	Peak chart positions										Certifications	Album
Title	Year	GER	AUS	AUT	FIN	FRA	NZ	SWE	SWI	UK	US	Certifications	Album
"Mambo No. 5 (A Little Bit of...)"	1999	1	1	1	1	1	1	1	1	1	3	BVMI: 3× Platinum; ARIA: 4× Platinum; BPI: 3× Platinum; IFPI AUT: 2× Platinum; IFPI SWE: 3× Platinum; IFPI SWI: 2× Platinum; RMNZ: 3× Platinum; SNEP: Diamond	A Little Bit of Mambo
"I Got a Girl"	1999	19	31	19	2	5	48	12	20	55	—	IFPI SWE: Gold	A Little Bit of Mambo
"Tricky, Tricky"	1999	—	—	—	—	—	—	55	—	—	74		A Little Bit of Mambo
"Mambo Mambo"	2000	—	—	—	—	11	—	—	—	—	—	SNEP: Silver	A Little Bit of Mambo
"Gentleman"	2001	35	—	16	—	54	—	—	62	—	—		Ladies and Gentlemen
"Just a Gigolo"	2001	94	—	—	—	—	—	—	—	—	—		Ladies and Gentlemen
"Bachata"	2006	100	—	—	—	69	—	—	—	—	—		Lounatic
"You Wanna Be Americano"	2006	—	—	—	—	—	—	—	—	—	—		Lounatic
"Conchita"	2007	—	—	—	—	—	—	—	—	—	—		Lounatic
"Boyfriend"	2010	71	—	—	—	—	—	—	—	—	—		Free Again
"Sweet Like Cola"	2010	38	—	—	—	—	—	—	—	—	—		Free Again
"This Is Ska"	2011	—	—	—	—	—	—	—	—	—	—		Non-album single
"Give It Up"	2013	—	—	—	—	—	—	—	—	—	—		A Little Bit of 80s
"Scatman & Hatman" (with Scatman John)	2019	—	—	—	—	—	—	—	—	—	—		90s Cruiser
"Buena Macarena"	2021	—	—	—	—	—	—	—	—	—	—		90s Cruiser
"Bongo Bong"	2021	—	—	—	—	—	—	—	—	—	—		90s Cruiser
"Let's Get the Fiesta Started"	2021	—	—	—	—	—	—	—	—	—	—		90s Cruiser
"—" denotes a recording that did not chart or was not released in that territory.

=== Promotional singles ===
List of singles, showing year released and album name
Title	Year	Album
"Mambo No. 5 (A Little Bit of Monica)"	2010	Non-album singles
"Chocolata"	2010	Non-album singles
"It's Christmas Time"	2010	Non-album singles

== Music videos ==
Year	Title	Director(s)
1999	"Mambo No. 5 (A Little Bit of...)"	Jorn Heitmann
1999	"I Got a Girl"	–
1999	"Tricky, Tricky"	–
2000	"Mambo Mambo"	–
2001	"Gentleman"	–
2001	"Just a Gigolo"	–
2006	"Bachata"	–
2006	"C'est la Vie" (featuring Edvin Marton)	–
2006	"The Streets of Roundswell" (featuring Daniel McCreadie)	–
2006	"You Wanna Be Americano"	–
2007	"Conchita"	–
2010	"Boyfriend"	Dave Coba
2010	"Sweet Like Cola"	Oliver Sommer
2013	"Give It Up"	–
2019	"Scatman & Hatman" (featuring Scatman John)	–
2021	"Buena Macarena"	–
2021	"Bongo Bong"	–
2021	"Let's Get the Fiesta Started"	–

=== Music video appearances ===
Year	Title	Director(s)	Notes
2000	"I Wanna Be Like You"	Volker Hannvacker	Disney video from the PC game The Jungle Book
