= Edle von Webenau =

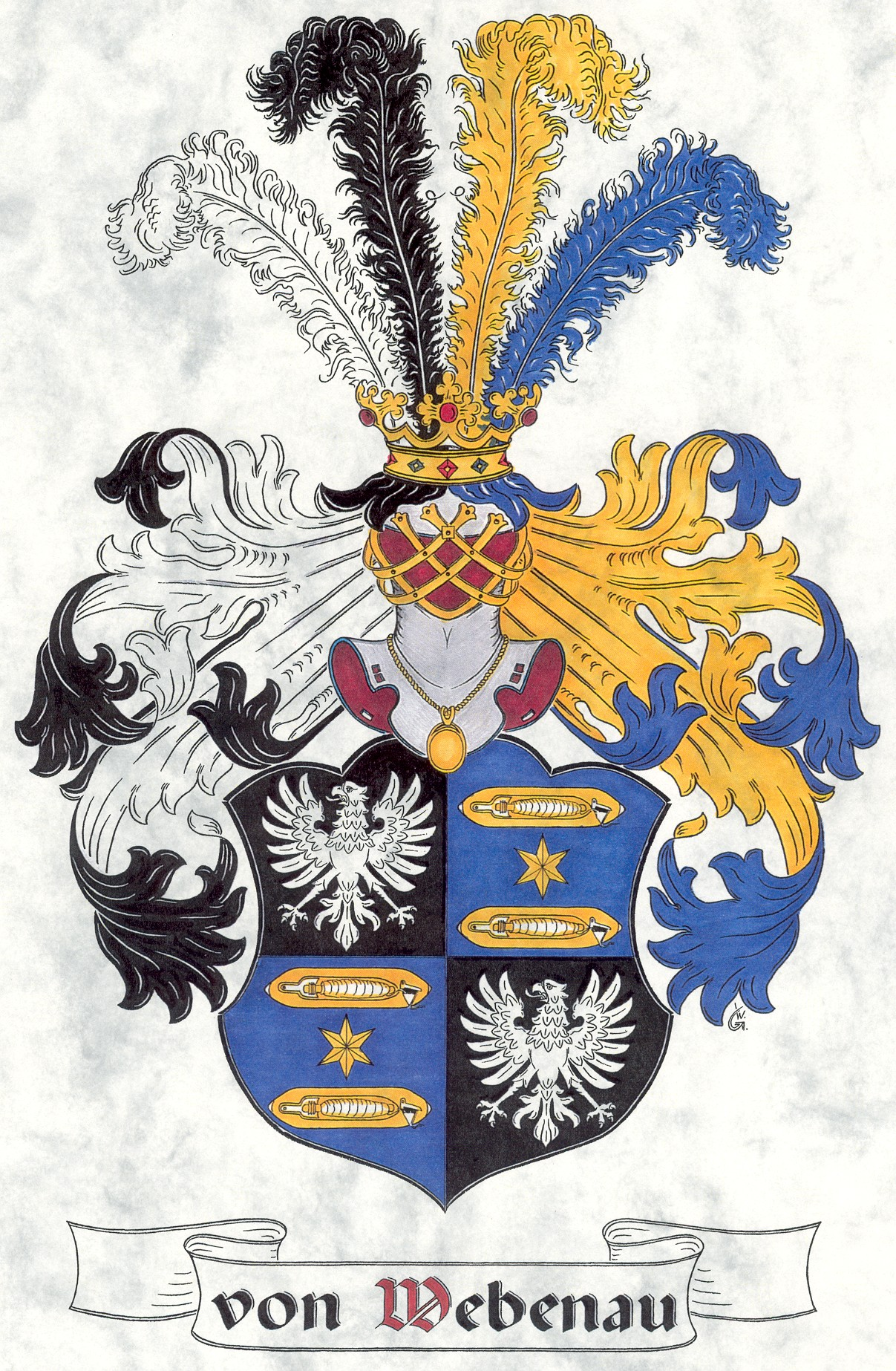
Coat of arms

The Edlen von Webenau are a family from Austria.

== Descendants ==
- Viktor Weber Edler von Webenau (* 13 November 1861 in Neuhaus; † 6 May 1932 in Innsbruck), General in the Austro-Hungarian army while World War I, military governor of Montenegro between 1916 and 1917 and head of the Austro-Hungarian armistice commission (Armistice of villa Giusti)
- Julie von Webenau née Baroni-Cavalcabò, (* 16 October 1813 in Lemberg; † 2 July 1887 in Graz), composer, student of Mozart's son Franz Xaver Wolfgang Mozart, Robert Schumann dedicated his Humoresque to her
- Vilma von Webenau, (* 15 February 1875 in Constantinople; † 9 October 1953 in Vienna), composer, first student of Arnold Schoenberg, granddaughter of Julie von Webenau, daughter of Arthur Weber Edler von Webenau, k. & k. counsellor in Constantinople
- Wolfgang Webenau, (* 31 July 1970 in Augsburg), German record producer (Syndicate Musicproduction), e.g. for Lou Bega and Compay Segundo (Buena Vista Social Club)
