= Bachata =

Bachata may refer to:

- Bachata (music), a musical genre which originated in the Dominican Republic
  - Traditional bachata, a subgenre of bachata music
  - Bachata (dance), a dance form
- Bachatón, a hybrid bachata/reggaeton music style
- "Bachata" (song), a song by Lou Bega
- "La Bachata", a song by Manuel Turizo
- Bachata: A Social History of a Dominican Popular Music

== See also ==
- Bachata Rosa, the fifth studio album by Dominican singer-songwriter Juan Luis Guerra and his group 4.40
- "Bachata en Fukuoka", single released by Juan Luis Guerra for his album A Son de Guerra
