= Boyfriend (Lou Bega song) =

Single by Lou Bega

from the album Free Again
- Released: 7 May 2010
- Genre: Pop
- Length: 2:51
- Label: DA
- Songwriter(s): Achim Kleist; Lou Bega; Lucas Finn; Max Lengert; Wolfgang V. Webenau
- Producer(s): Syndicate Musicproduction

Lou Bega singles chronology
"Conchita" (2007)	"Boyfriend" (2010)	"Sweet Like Cola" (2010)

"Boyfriend" is a single by Lou Bega from his fourth album Free Again.

== Music video ==
The music video for "Boyfriend" is directed by Dave Coba and recorded in Berlin in the old Film Noir style. Lou Bega stated that playing a double role in the video "hasn't been easy".

== Track listing ==
CD single

1. "Boyfriend" – 2:51
2. "Lucky Punch" – 2:31

== Charts ==
Chart performance for "Boyfriend"
Chart (2010)	Peak position
Belgium (Ultratip Bubbling Under Flanders)	19
Germany (GfK)	71
