= Bob the Builder: The Album =

2001 studio album by Bob the Builder

Studio album by Bob the Builder
- Released: 5 October 2001
- Label: BBC Worldwide Music
- Producers: Paul K Joyce; Grant Mitchell

Bob the Builder chronology
Bob the Builder: The Album (2001)	Never Mind the Breeze Blocks (2008)

Singles from Bob the Builder: The Album
- 1. "Can We Fix It?" Released: 2000; 2. "Mambo No. 5" Released: 2001

Bob the Builder: The Album is the debut album of Bob the Builder, the fictional character from the BBC children's television series of the same name. Bob is voiced by actor Neil Morrissey.

It features the two UK number one singles "Can We Fix It?" and "Mambo No. 5".

== Track listing ==
1. "Can We Fix It?"
2. "Mambo No. 5"
3. "Bob's Line Dance"
4. "Right Tool for the Job"
5. "Let's Get Busy"
6. "What Can I Be (Spud's Song)"
7. "Blonde Haired Gal in a Hard Hat (Wendy's Song)"
8. "Dizzy!"
9. "Super Spud (Spud's Dub)"
10. "No One Can Dig It Like We Do"
11. "No Prob Bob"
12. "Crocodile Rock" - Bob the Builder & Elton John

== Personnel ==
- Neil Morrissey - lead and backing vocals, voices of Bob, Roley, Lofty, Farmer Percy Pickles and Scruffty
- Kate Harbour - backing vocals, voices of Wendy, Dizzy, Mrs. Potts, Mrs. Percival and Pilchard
- Rob Rackstraw - backing vocals, voices of Scoop, Muck, Spud, Travis, Mr. Bernard Bentley and Squawk
- Neol Davies - additional backing vocals
- Paul Holmes - additional backing vocals
- Kathy Staley - additional backing vocals
- Pete Simpson - additional backing vocals
- Mike Ward - additional backing vocals
- Shaun Ward - additional backing vocals, additional programming (tracks 6, 7)
- Grant Mitchell - additional backing vocals, keyboards, bass, drum programming, guitar, production
- Graham Dickson - additional backing vocals, recording, mixing, guitar (track 9), milk bottles (track 7)
- Kevin Browne - guitar (tracks 1, 4, 11)
- Paul Joyce - production, keyboards, drums, guitars
- Adam Drake - guitar (tracks 6, 7, 8, 10)
- Simon Woodgate - keyboards, bass, drum programming (track 4)
- Elton John - guest vocals, piano, keyboards (track 12)
- Gus Dudgeon - additional vocals (track 12)

== Charts ==
=== Weekly charts ===
Chart (2001–02)	Peak position
Australian Albums (ARIA)	1
Belgian Albums (Ultratop Flanders)	44
Irish Albums (IRMA)	59
New Zealand Albums (RMNZ)	32
Scottish Albums (Official Charts)	7
UK Albums (Official Charts)	4
US Independent Albums (Billboard)	24

=== Year-end charts ===
Chart (2001)	Position
Australian Albums (ARIA)	25
UK Albums (OCC)	94
