= Free Again (Lou Bega album) =

Studio album by Lou Bega
- Released: 21 May 2010
- Genre: Latin pop
- Length: 39:21
- Label: DA
- Producer: Achim Kleist and Wolfgang von Webenau (Syndicate Musicproduction)

Lou Bega chronology
Lounatic (2005)	Free Again (2010)	A Little Bit of 80s (2013)

Singles from Free Again
- 1. "Boyfriend" Released: 7 May 2010; 2. "Sweet Like Cola" Released: 23 July 2010

Free Again is the fourth album by German singer Lou Bega, released on 21 May 2010 in Germany, Austria and Switzerland. It has since been released in other countries.

== Track listing ==
1. "Boyfriend" – 2:51
2. "Sweet Like Cola" – 3:23
3. "Mommy Is Hot" – 3:50
4. "Jump Into My Bed" – 3:32
5. "I'm a Singer" – 3:10
6. "Beautiful World" – 3:21
7. "A Man Is Not a Woman" – 2:55
8. "My Day" – 3:08
9. "Lucky Punch" – 2:30
10. "You're a Liar" – 2:42
11. "1 No. 1" – 1:59
12. "Ballin'" – 3:34
13. "Josephine's Jeans" – 3:00

== Personnel ==
Adapted from AllMusic.

- Petra Bonmassar – vocals
- André Carol – trumpet
- Hans-Philipp Graf – mastering
- Roman Lüth – composer, instrumentation, producer
- Wolfgang Webenau – producer, instrumentation
- Fritz Michallik – programming, instrumentation, producer
- Bridger Fogle – choir, chorus
- Alex Heil – artwork
- Max Lengert – composer
- Massimiliano Emili – guitar
- Lucas Finn – composer
- Billy King – choir, chorus
- Lou Bega – liner notes
- Achim Kleist – producer, instrumentation
- Jörg Sander – guitar

== Charts ==
Chart performance for Free Again
Chart (2010)	Peak position
Swiss Albums (Schweizer Hitparade)	78
