= You Wanna Be Americano =

Single by Lou Bega

from the album Lounatic
- Released: 3 November 2006
- Genre: Latin pop, jazz
- Length: 3:11
- Label: Da Music
- Songwriters: Nicola Salerno; Renato Carosone; Lou Bega
- Producer: Goar B

Lou Bega singles chronology
"Bachata" (2006)	"You Wanna Be Americano" (2006)	"Conchita" (2007)

"You Wanna Be Americano" is a song by Lou Bega. It is a cover version of the Italian song "Tu vuò fà l'americano" by Renato Carosone. Bega's version starts with an excerpt from "The Star-Spangled Banner". "You Wanna Be Americano" peaked at number 25 on the Italian Singles Chart.

== Track listings ==
CD single

1. "You Wanna Be Americano" – 3:11
2. "Return of "A Little Bit"" – 3:49

Maxi-single

1. "You Wanna Be Americano" (album version) – 20:12
2. "You Wanna Be Americano" (Danny Labana remix) – 3:11
3. "You Wanna Be Americano" (Tommy Gunn remix) – 3:00
4. "Bachata" (Tommy Gunn – Raggatone remix) – 13:37
5. "Call Your Name" – 2:52

== Charts ==
Chart performance for "You Wanna Be Americano"
Chart (2006)	Peak position
Italy (FIMI)	25
