= Danielle O'Brien =

Australian ice dancer

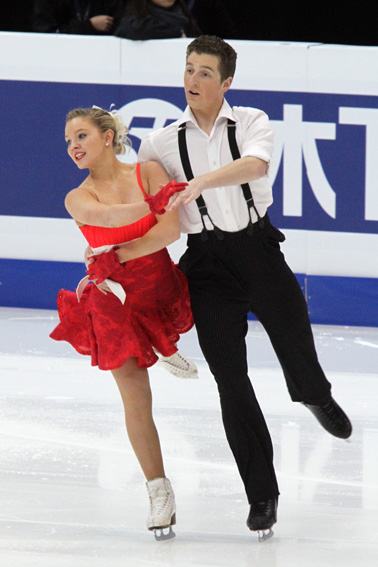
- O'Brien/Merriman in 2011.

Personal information
- Born: 7 February 1990 (age 36) Sydney
- Height: 150 cm (4 ft 11 in)

Figure skating career
- Country: Australia
- Partner: Gregory Merriman
- Skating club: Sydney FSC
- Began skating: 1997
- Retired: April 11, 2014

Danielle O'Brien (born 7 February 1990) is an Australian former competitive ice dancer. With partner Gregory Merriman, she is a six-time Australian senior national champion and three-time junior national champion. They have competed at the World Championships and Four Continents Championships since 2008, and have competed at three World Junior Championships. They became the first Australian ice dancers to reach the free dance at a World Championships.

== Career ==
Danielle O'Brien teamed up with Gregory Merriman, who also skated at the Canterbury Olympic Ice Rink, in April 1998. They were coached by Australian ice dancing champion Monica MacDonald in Sydney, Australia. In the 2009–10 season, they trained with former World champion Victor Kraatz and Maikki Kraatz. O'Brien/Merriman withdrew from the 2009 Nebelhorn Trophy, the final qualifying opportunity for the 2010 Winter Olympics, due to Merriman's diagnosis of pericarditis, a viral infection in the sac surrounding the heart.

In the 2010–11 season, O'Brien/Merriman began training part-time in Bloomfield Hills, Michigan under coaches Anjelika Krylova, two-time World champion, and Pasquale Camerlengo. They relocated to Detroit to train there full-time in late 2011. Although Merriman's heel of his boot separated during the preliminary round at the 2012 World Championships, they placed eighth out of 23 couples and qualified for the short dance, where they placed 20th and qualified for the free. O'Brien/Merriman became the first Australian team to qualify for the free dance at a World Championships. They finished 20th overall.

In 2012–13, O'Brien/Merriman finished 7th at the US International Classic, 4th at the 2012 Ondrej Nepela Memorial, 8th at the 2012 NRW Trophy and 4th at the 2012 Ice Challenge. In January 2013, they became the first Australian ice dancers to medal at an International event when they took bronze at the Toruń Cup in Poland. In February, O'Brien/Merriman competed at the 2013 Four Continents Championships where they finished with a personal best placement of eighth. They did not qualify for the 2013 World Championships due to new TES requirements.

The 2013 Nebelhorn Trophy was the last chance to qualify for the Olympics; O'Brien/Merriman finished sixth and earned a place for Australia in the Olympic ice dancing event. At the 2014 Winter Olympics, they advanced to the free dance and finished 20th. They retired from competition on April 21, 2014.

== Programs ==
(with Merriman)

Season	Short dance	Free dance
2013–2014	Quickstep: Cotton Club Stomp 1; Foxtrot: The Mooche by John Barry; Charleston: Cotton Club Stomp 2 by Duke Ellington; Cotton-Eyed Joe; Old Country Waltz	Thunder and Blazes; Goofus performed by Sounds of the Circus South Shore Concert Band; Complainte de la Butte by Rufus Wainwright; The Southerner performed by The Merle Evans Circus Band
2012–2013	Cotton-Eyed Joe; Old Country Waltz	Thunder and Blazes; Goofus performed by Sounds of the Circus South Shore Concert Band; Complainte de la Butte by Rufus Wainwright; The Southerner performed by The Merle Evans Circus Band
2011–2012	Mambo Mambo by Latin Soul Syndicate; Samba: Ay Mama (Dance mix)	In the Mood by Glenn Miller; Moonlight Serenade performed by Frank Sinatra; Sing, Sing, Sing by Benny Goodman
2010–2011	Waltz from Cousins by Erich Kuenzel; Quickstep: Dancing Fool by Barry Manilow	Boxes; After Car; Trust Me; Golf by Marvin Hamlisch
	Original dance	
2009–2010	Australian aboriginal music: Yulara by Scott Wilson and James Drury; Warrama by David Hudson; Kikin Kooka's by Scott Wilson and James Drury	Great Balls of Fire by Jerry Lee Lewis; Love Potion No. 9 by The Clovers; Shout by The Isley Brothers
2008–2009	Lindyhop; Swing Sing, Sing, Sing by Louis Prima; This Business of Love (from The Mask)	Beethoven's Last Night Overture; The Dark; Ouverture by Trans-Siberian Orchestra
2007–2008	Australian Aboriginal music: Forest Phunk; Yulara by S. Wilson, J. Drury, Turtle on Yulara	Mamma Mia musical by ABBA: Overture, Prologue; SOS; Mamma Mia
2006–2007	Argentinos by C. Novell; Hey Sexy Lady by Birch and Morrisen	King Swing by Swing City Giants; This Business of Love (from The Mask); Hey Pachuco by Crown Review
2005–2006	Mambo: Johnny's Mambo by Michael Lloyd; Cha Cha: Sway by Michael Buble; Samba	King Swing by Swing City Giants; This Business of Love (from The Mask); Hey Pachuco by Crown Review
2004–2005	George of the Jungle; Pink Panther Henry Mancini	White Stones by Secret Garden, Rolf Lovland: Steps; Windancer; Moving
2003–2004		White Stones by Secret Garden, Rolf Lovland: Steps; Windancer; Moving

== Results ==
(with Merriman)

Results
International
Event	04–05	05–06	06–07	07–08	08–09	09–10	10–11	11–12	12–13	13–14
Olympics										20th
Worlds				27th	25th	25th	27th	20th		24th
Four Continents				10th	10th	10th	9th	9th	8th	7th
Ice Challenge									4th	
Nebelhorn						WD	15th			6th
NRW Trophy									8th	
Ondrej Nepela							10th		4th	
Skate Down Under										1st
Toruń Cup									3rd	
U.S. Classic									7th	
Volvo Cup										12th
International: Junior
Junior Worlds	26th	23rd	20th							
JGP China	10th									
JGP Japan		11th								
JGP Taiwan			10th							
National
Australian Champ.	1st J.	1st J.	1st J.	1st	1st	1st	1st	1st	1st	1st
JGP = Junior Grand Prix; WD = Withdrew
