= Mirror to the Sky (song) =

Song by Yes

from the album Mirror to the Sky
- Released: 19 May 2023 (album version); 23 February 2024 (single version)
- Recorded: 2022
- Studio: Yes HQ, Curtis Schwartz Studio
- Genre: Progressive rock
- Length: 13:54 (album version); 7:05 (single edit)
- Label: Sony Music
- Songwriters: Jon Davison; Steve Howe
- Producer: Steve Howe

"Mirror to the Sky" is a song by the British progressive rock band Yes, the track was first released on the band's 23rd studio album Mirror to the Sky, released in May 2023. It is a near-14-minute recording, described as "sweeping and cinematic".

== Composition ==
"Mirror to the Sky" refers to tikkun olam and anima mundi in its lyrics. It also features orchestral passages composed by Paul K Joyce.

The track's near-14-minute length has been described as a representation of Yes' return to their trademark progressive rock format. It has also been identified as the centerpiece to the Mirror to the Sky album. The song's arpeggios and multilayered vocals have been likened to material from the band's Tales from Topographic Oceans record. A seven-minute single edit was released on 23 February 2024.

== Reception ==
It was described as a "prog epic" by music writer Howard Whitman. Writer David Pearson described the song as "atmospheric and sonically superb". Wesley Derbyshire noted that guitarist Steve Howe's use of delays and reverb was "extremely evident", and potentially designed for the Dolby Atmos and 5.1 Surround Sound release. Hugh Fielder of Classic Rock enjoyed the track, stating how guitarist Steve Howe has "clearly been energised and has grown in confidence", allowing the track to spread over 14 minutes after some "fine introductory guitar" and "skedaddling bass runs by Sherwood".

== Personnel ==
Yes

- Jon Davison – co-lead and backing vocals, acoustic guitars [Martin MC28, Taylor 714]
- Steve Howe – guitars [Fender steel, Fender Telecaster, Martin MC28 and 12 String], co-lead and backing vocals
- Geoff Downes – synthesizers, piano
- Billy Sherwood – bass guitar, vocals
- Jay Schellen – drums and percussion

Additional musicians

- FAMES Studio Orchestra
- Oleg Kondratenko – conductor
- Paul K. Joyce - orchestral arrangements

Production

- Steve Howe – producer
- Curtis Schwartz – engineering, mixing
