= Lope Balaguer =

Dominican singer (1925–2015)

José Manuel López Balaguer (born August 22 1925, in Santiago de los Caballeros – died January 29 2015, in Santo Domingo) also known as Lope Balaguer, was a Dominican singer; he was nephew of Dominican president Joaquín Balaguer and cousin of the musicians Johnny Pacheco and Nelo López. He married Flor de Oro Trujillo, daughter of dictator Rafael Trujillo.

== Biography ==
Lope Balaguer debuted in 1940 as a singer in the radio. In 1944 in Bonao he did his first presentation in the radio station The Voice of the Yuna, with the San José orchestra, with which in the following year under the direction of the composer and Cuban pianist Julio Gutiérrez debuted in the Coffee Ariete in Santo Domingo. HILL Magazine chose him as the best singer of the country and gave him the nickname of The tenor of the youth. In the same year he travelled to Cuba, where he acted in nocturnal clubs of Havana and the radio, and is where he took the artistic name of Lope Balaguer.

In Puerto Rico he enjoyed of the success of The Escambrón, and in 1946 the magazine Living room Fígaro chose him as best singer of the year alongside Manuel Hernández in Santo Domingo. In 1947 it was conceded to him an agreement with the radio station The Voice of the Yuna (from 1949, The Dominican Voice). He had done tours to Puerto Rico, Venezuela, Colombia, Guatemala, El Salvador, Panama, Haiti, Guadeloupe, Martinique and United States.

In 1946, Lope Balaguer recorded his first disks with Luis Benjamín in Puerto Rico. With the orchestra of Antonio Morel, records a disk with Dominican songs. His more sounded successes were Never Have said you of Pope Molina, Neither Neither Steps by Luis Kalaff, Sands of the desert of Héctor Cabral and Rafael Columbus, Follow me of Manuel Troncoso, Then married me by tí of Rafael Solano, An unforgettable day by Pedro Vilar and Of meat or iron of Fernando Arias. In general, he recorded 28 disks of vinyl, 5 CDs and recently several CDs of audio.

== Ancestors ==
Ancestors of Lope Balaguer

16. (Spain) José Manuel López
8. (Spain) Carlos López López
17. (Spain) Encarnación López
4. José Manuel López Rodríguez
9. Petronila Rodríguez
2. Armando Pompeyo López Bonilla
10. Carlos Antonio Bonilla Bidó
5. Rosa Justa Capitolina Bonilla Tavares
11. Engracia Tavares Tavares
1. José Manuel López Balaguer
12. (Spain) José Antonio Balaguer
6. Joaquín Jesús Balaguer Lespier
13. Isabel Lespier
3. Carmen Celia Balaguer Ricardo
14. Colonel Manuel de Jesús Ricardo
7. Carmen Celia Ricardo Heureaux (half-cousin of Ulises Heureaux)
30. (France) Pierre-Alexandre Heureaux (grandfather of Ulises Heureaux)
15. Rosa Amelia Heureaux Domínguez; (half-aunt of Ulises Heureaux)
31. Josefa Domínguez

Source
Instituto Dominicano de Genealogía (Cápsulas genealógicas)

== Discography ==
- Confession of Love (with Pope Molina) (1950)
1. Confession of Love
2. Like this it is the Life
3. Footprints of Pain
4. Easy to Remember
5. Súplica
6. By All the Ways
7. Injure me Again
8. Crooked child
9. It laughs
10. Now That Are Alone
11. Call me
12. The Torrent
- Headcount (with the Orchestra of Ángel Bussi) (1950)
1. Headcount
2. And Anybody More than Me
3. The Goblin
4. Liar With me
5. It is Curious
6. Preciosidad
7. Goodbye Mine life
8. In An Odd World
9. The Kiss That Gave Me
10. Mannequin
11. Days of School
12. Yours
- Lope Balaguer and the Saint Orchestra José (with Pope Molina) (1960)
1. Apparition
2. The Mortgage
3. Corazonada
4. You know Why
5. Papers
6. Always You
7. I Am That
8. In the Darkness
9. Each Day More and more
10. It was Your Fault
11. If Some Time
12. I Need you
- Serrana (With the Orchestra of Ángel Bussi) (1960)
1. Serrana
2. It wanted to Be
3. It returns to My
4. Paradise Dreamed
5. Dry leaf
6. Yours
7. Selfishness
8. To the Return
9. They see
10. Distrust
11. My Adoration
12. Missed Meeting
- There will be A New World By Love (1968)
- Lope Balaguer of Today and of Always (1969)
1. Why you Cry?
2. It has to Be
3. It is Well
4. As it Treats A Woman
5. It takes My Love
6. Sea of Sleeplessness
7. You Do not abandon Me
8. I am to Your Order
9. My Glory
10. That Romance
- Album of Gold (1975)

Disk 1

1. Peregrina Without Love
2. The Reason
3. My Glory
4. There is A lot That Forget
5. You Do not abandon Me
6. Follow me
7. By Love
8. Selfishness
9. Sands of the Desert
10. Crooked child

Disk 2

1. I crossed the Border
2. Never I Have Said it to You
3. Flor of Naranjo
4. In the Darkness
5. They see
6. Paradise Dreamed
7. Have Jealousies
8. Serrana
9. To the Return
10. When Me Besas
- I Seat me Well With you (1976)
1. I Seat me Well With you
2. An Unforgettable Day
3. Of Which Voucher That Want You
4. The Reason
5. I crossed the Border
6. When it Go back the Snow
7. As it Treats to A Woman
8. So Alone A Poor Corazón
9. Adultery
10. No Me Arrepiento of the Affection That Gave You
- Those Years Forty... (1977)
1. That Is missing You Do Me
2. Free soul
3. Embrace me Like this
4. Yours lies
5. Black night
6. Last night I Spoke With the Moon
7. Thank you
8. Reality
9. No longer I Go back to Want
10. I Do not have to Go back
11. The Night, the Moon and I
12. You Do not go You
- Spectacular (1977)
1. It wanted to With you
2. Absence
3. A Woman
4. Something Goes
5. When it Rains
6. I offer By You
7. Amnesia
8. The Love Is One
9. Ojalá
10. I Do not have Corazón
- Album of Gold (1980)

Disk 1

1. When it Go back the Snow
2. By Love
3. Have Jealousies
4. So Alone A Poor Corazón
5. Crooked child
6. As it Treats A Woman
7. Sands of the Desert
8. Paradise Dreamed
9. They see
10. Selfishness

Disk 2

1. To the Return
2. Flor of Naranjo
3. Serrana
4. You Do not go You
5. I Do not go back to Want
6. I Seat me Well With you
7. The Night, the Moon and I
8. Last night I Spoke With the Moon
9. Embrace me Like this
10. Of Which Voucher That Want You
- My Life Is A Song (1988)
1. My Life Is A Song
2. Confession / The Casita
3. It finish
4. Small Mine
5. Without You
6. Different Love
7. Of Which Way Want Me
8. What will be of My
9. When you Arrived You
10. Potpourri in Do Lower
11. Old Letter
12. Ternezas
13. You Do not go You More
14. The Nightingale Bohemio
15. It is With You
- Album of Gold (1990)
1. To the Return
2. Flor of Naranjo
3. They see
4. Serrana
5. Paradise Dreamed
6. Selfishness
7. Sands of the Desert
8. Crooked child
9. As it Treats to A Woman
10. So Alone A Poor Corazón
11. By Love
12. Have Jealousies
13. When it Go back the Snow
