= Hall Park Academy =

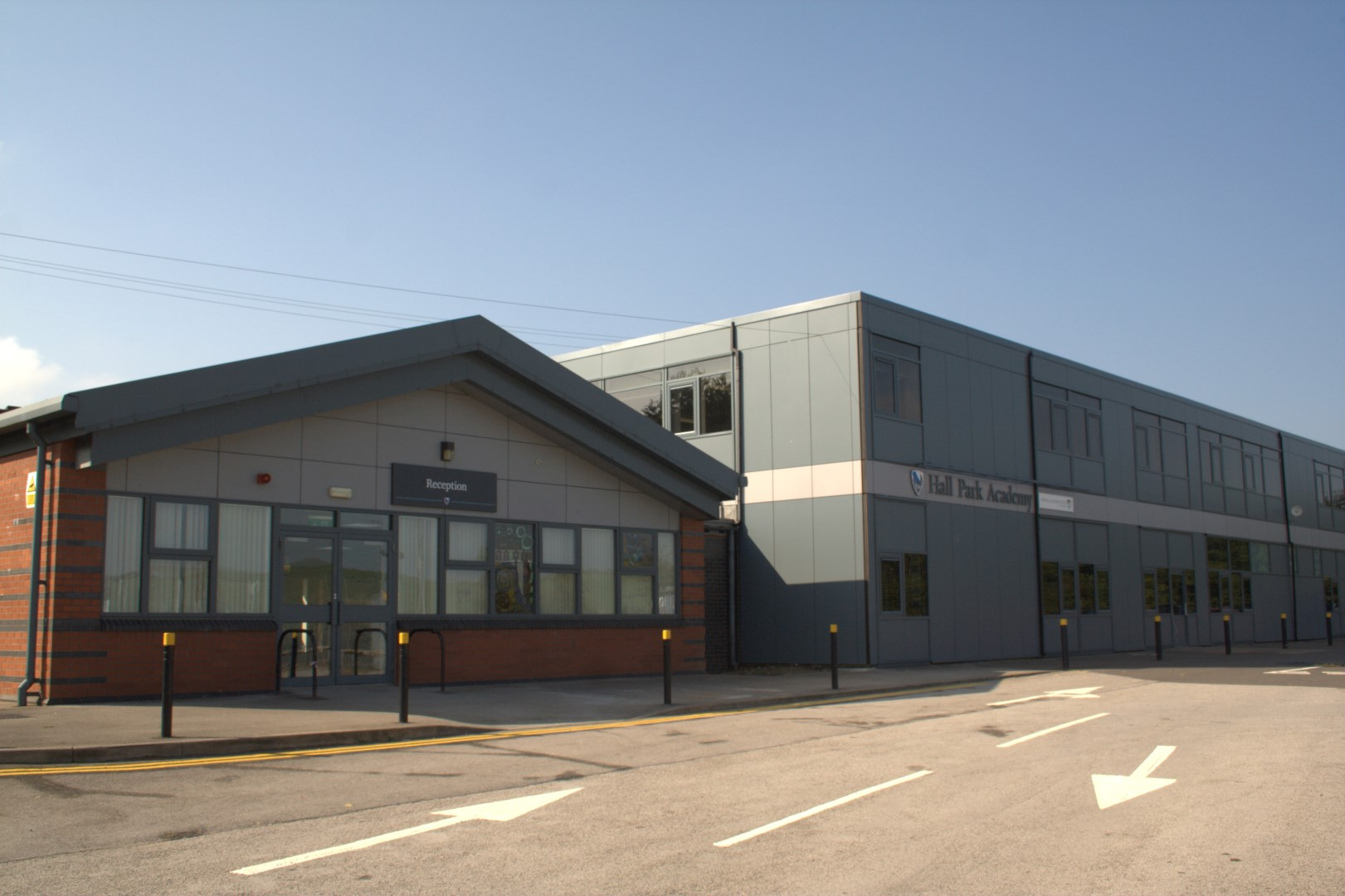
- Main reception area and school building

Location
- Mansfield Road; Eastwood, Nottinghamshire, NG16 3EA; England
- Coordinates: 53.01969°N 1.31288°W

Information
- Type: Academy
- Trust: Redhill Academy Trust (2014–)
- Department for Education URN: 140992 Tables
- Ofsted: Reports
- Executive Head: Andrew Burns
- Headteacher: David Crossley
- Gender: Coeducational
- Age: 11 to 18
- Houses: Astle, Collier, Erewash, Lawrence,
- Website: http://www.hallparkacademy.org.uk/

Hall Park Academy (formerly Eastwood Comprehensive School) is a coeducational secondary school and sixth form located in Eastwood in the English county of Nottinghamshire.

Previously a community school administered by Nottinghamshire County Council, Eastwood Comprehensive School converted to academy status on 1 July 2014 and was renamed Hall Park Academy. The school is now sponsored by the Redhill Academy Trust, however Hall Park Academy continues to coordinate with Nottinghamshire County Council for admissions.

Hall Park Academy offers GCSEs, BTECs and NVQs as programmes of study for pupils, while students in the sixth form have the option to study from a range of A Levels and further BTECs.

== History ==
=== Technical school ===
The school was known as Eastwood Hall Park Secondary Technical School, a technical-grammar school, which opened in 1957.

== Notable former pupils ==
=== Eastwood Comprehensive School ===
- Samit Patel, cricketer
- Lone (musician), electronic musician

=== Hall Park Technical Grammar School ===
- Stuart Boam, who was a centre-back for Middlesbrough
- Alan Buckley, who was a striker for Walsall
- Paul K. Joyce (head boy in 1975), composer who wrote Can We Fix It? (reached number 1 in 2000) for Bob the Builder
