= Pérez Prado Plays Mucho Mambo for Dancing =

Studio album by Pérez Prado and His Orchestra
- Released: 1950
- Genre: Mambo
- Label: RCA Victor

Pérez Prado Plays Mucho Mambo for Dancing is an album by Pérez Prado and His Orchestra. It was released in 1950 on the RCA Victor label. The album includes Prado's Mambo No. 5.

In December 1950, Bob Goddard in the St. Louis Globe-Democrat described the album as "scorching" and concluded: "It's utterly impossible to sit still while any of this is going on."

In a 2024 ranking of the 600 greatest Latin American albums, Pérez Prado Plays Mucho Mambo for Dancing was ranked No. 42. Reviewer Ernesto Martín del Campo called it one of the "fundamental albums of Latin music," one that "invites both sweaty dancing and attentive listening."

== Track listing ==
Side A

1. Mambo No. 8
2. Pachito E-Che
3. Oh Caballo

Side B

1. Pianolo
2. Mambo No. 5
3. Babarabatiri
