= Bachata (song) =

Single by Lou Bega

from the album Lounatic
- Released: May 29, 2006
- Genre: Latin pop
- Length: 3:22
- Label: Da Music / Unicade Music
- Songwriter(s): Lou Bega; Markus Schwarz; Sandra Schorlemmer; Sascha Vasic; Tino Behrendt
- Producer(s): Goar B

Lou Bega singles chronology
"Just a Gigolo / I Ain't Got Nobody" (2001)	"Bachata" (2006)	"You Wanna Be Americano" (2006)

"Bachata" is a song by Lou Bega. It was the first single from his third album Lounatic. The song features background vocals by the Ukrainian girl group Alibi. The song is about dancing bachata on a party and the erotic effect of this dance.

== Chart performance ==
Chart (2006)	Peak position
France	69
Germany	100
Netherlands	88

== Track listing ==
CD single

1. "Bachata" (Radio Mix) - 3:22
2. "Why Don't You" - 3:10

Maxi single

1. "Bachata" (Radio Mix) - 3:22
2. "Bachata" (Acoustic Mix) - 3:09
3. "Bachata" (Tommy Gunn Remix) - 3:28
4. "Bachata" (Latin Version) - 3:10
5. "Bachata" (Club Version) - 3:24
6. "Why Don't You" - 3:10

Special French edition

1. "Bachata" (Radio Mix) - 3:22
2. "Bachata" (Acoustic Mix) - 3:09
3. "Return of "A Little Bit"" - 3:49
4. "Bachata" (Music Video) - 3:22
