= Mirror to the Sky =

Studio album by Yes
- Released: 19 May 2023
- Recorded: 2022
- Studios: Curtis Schwartz Studio (Ardingly, West Sussex); FAMES Project Studio (orchestra) (Skopje, North Macedonia)
- Genre: Progressive rock
- Length: 47:08 (Original Album); 63:35 (with disc 2)
- Labels: InsideOut Music; Sony Music
- Producer: Steve Howe

Yes chronology
The Quest (2021)	Mirror to the Sky (2023)	Yessingles (2023)

Singles from Mirror to the Sky
- 1. "Cut from the Stars" Released: 10 March 2023; 2. "All Connected" Released: 26 April 2023; 3. "Circles of Time" Released: 24 May 2023

Mirror to the Sky is the twenty-third studio album by English progressive rock band Yes, released on 19 May 2023 by InsideOut Music and Sony Music.

It is their first studio album with American drummer Jay Schellen as a full-time member following the death of long-time Yes drummer Alan White in 2022 (and the first without White since 1972's Close to the Edge), to whom the album is dedicated; Schellen had frequently filled in as drummer for White since 2016, and had performed percussion as a guest on the band's previous album, 2021's The Quest.

Yes started work on the album shortly before the release of The Quest in October 2021. Like for its predecessor, guitarist Steve Howe resumed his role as producer, and the FAMES Orchestra in North Macedonia provided orchestral arrangements by Paul K. Joyce on some songs. The album was released on CD, LP, Blu-ray, and digital platforms, with some editions containing additional artwork by long-time Yes cover artist Roger Dean. It received positive reviews from critics, some of whom considered the album superior to its recent predecessors.

== Background and recording ==
In October 2021, the Yes line-up of guitarist Steve Howe, drummer Alan White, keyboardist Geoff Downes, lead vocalist Jon Davison, and bassist Billy Sherwood, with Jay Schellen guesting on percussion, released The Quest. In the same month Downes revealed that the group had already discussed ideas for a follow-up album, to which Sherwood confirmed in May 2022 that work on it was underway. Later in May 2022, Yes announced that White would sit out of the upcoming 2022 world tour to commemorate the fiftieth anniversary of Close to the Edge (1972), due to illness. White died three days later and Schellen, who had been handling most of the band's live work since 2016, took over on the drums. In February 2023, Yes announced that Schellen had become a full-time member.

When work on the album began the band still had a lot of potential musical ideas to develop, partly due to the amount of time spent away from recording during the COVID-19 pandemic. Howe said the group were in a strong "creative zone" at the time, and approached Mirror to the Sky in a similar way to The Quest, but wanted the new album not to be a mere repeat of the last. They started with two ideas for songs that they wanted to turn into longer pieces, which became the 13-minute track "Mirror to the Sky" and the 9-minute "Luminosity". Yes recorded the album in 2022, with Sherwood and Schellen recording their respective parts in California. Like its predecessor, Howe resumed his role as producer and the FAMES Orchestra in North Macedonia provide orchestral arrangements by Paul K. Joyce on some songs. The band also continued to work with engineer and mixer Curtis Schwartz at his studio in Ardingly, West Sussex.

== Artwork ==
The artwork was produced by the band's longtime cover artist Roger Dean. His design was inspired by a story that video game designer Henk Rogers had told him, which involved Rogers paddling to the middle of a lake at night during a camping trip. When the ripples of the water had settled, Dean said that "the lake became a perfect mirror to a very brilliant night sky", an experience that Rogers said was like being in space. The idea caught Dean's imagination and wanted to portray such a concept into one of his designs. He added: "I started with a horizon low down with a lot of sky but then I realised, no, I'll show with ocean in the main area with a sky just a sliver, enough to show it is mirrored. Then I decided to put in a rock formation–a viewing point for the sky." An early design of the band's logo for the cover featured a colour scheme and texture based on the Nebra sky disc, an artefact from the Early Bronze Age discovered in Germany in 1999 that Howe had suggested to Dean. It was not used as the colours did not complement the rest of the design. Dean was able to visit the group in Ardingly several times as he lives nearby.

== Songs ==
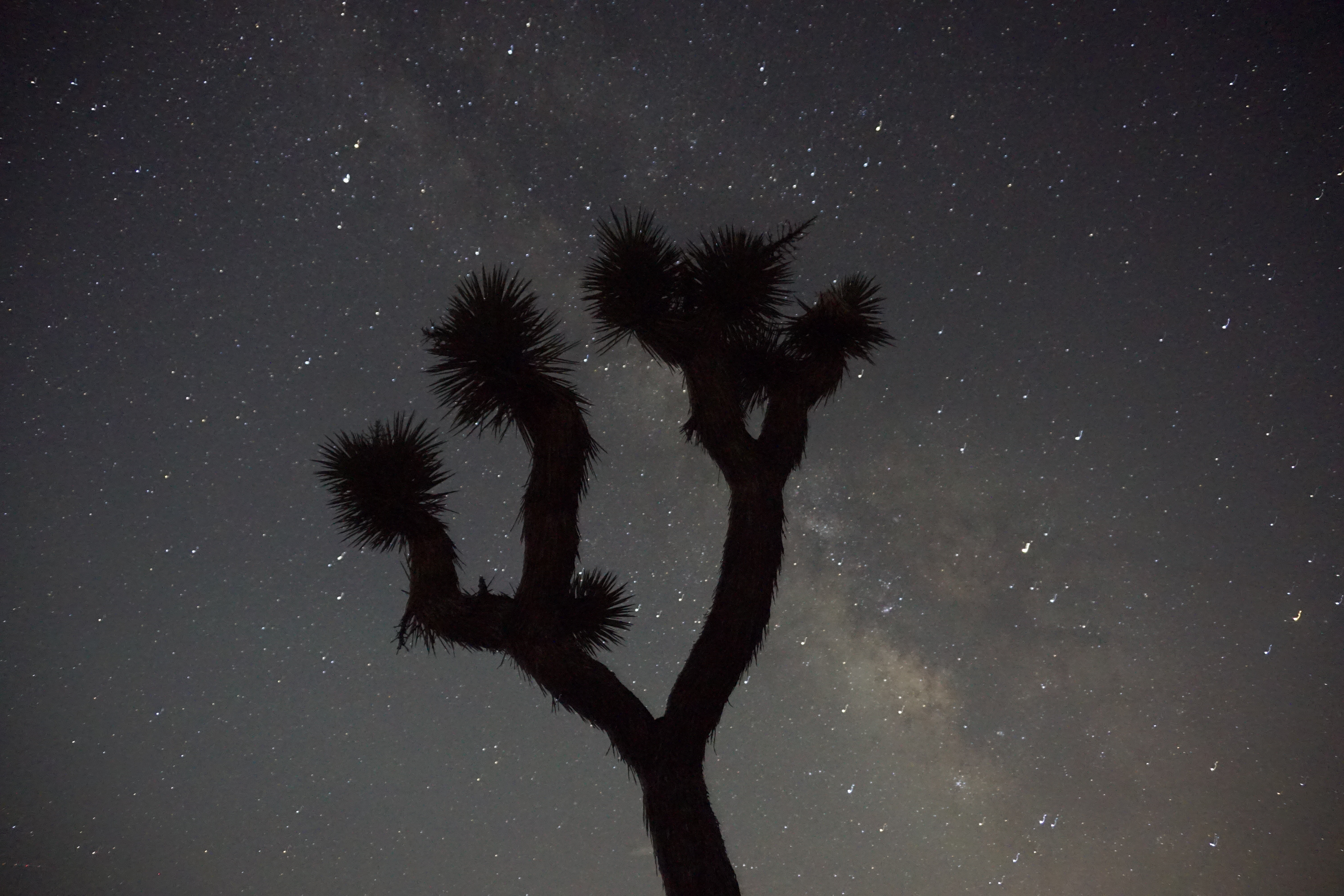
"Cut from the Stars" was inspired by vocalist Jon Davison's visit to Joshua Tree National Park at night with his family

"Cut from the Stars" was primarily inspired by Davison's first visit to a dark-sky preserve at Joshua Tree National Park with his brother and father, who encouraged him to appreciate nature. Davison praised Sherwood's instrumental ideas he had for the song, and the "twinkling" sound it portrayed to Davison made him write words relating to the sky. Davison took Sherwood's initial parts and rearranged them using audio editing software to make a new arrangement, after which the band built on it and reproduced their respective parts. Howe took what was the song's bridge and made it an instrumental outro. Howe said the track is the most different of all the album's tracks in terms of guitar styles, using an analogue pedal board that had an automatic double wah-wah effect.

The 9-minute "All Connected" was co-written by Davison, Howe, and Sherwood. Davison credited ideas from Howe that were used for the introduction and ending, and for Sherwood's vocal and lyrical contributions. The pair approached the song's lyrical themes in different ways; Davison said Sherwood took on a more "technological and physical" aspect, whereby he looked at it from a metaphysical view.

The group produced two versions of "Luminosity", having felt a new arrangement was needed after recording the first. It features Howe playing an autoharp. Its initial title was "Luminous", but it was subsequently changed after Howe, Davison, and Sherwood expanded on the initial arrangement that they had worked out and made it what Howe described as "a bigger tune".

"Living Out Their Dream" features an introduction that Howe considered reminiscent of The Rolling Stones, and said the song has a slight tongue-in-cheek lyric. He said that everything that the lyrics describe actually happened, whether it was something he read about or was present at the time. One specific incident that inspired his lyrics was a visit to a steak and seafood restaurant where a wedding was taking place.

"Circles of Time" originated from a musical idea of Davison's that Howe insisted to put on the album. The group made several arrangements of the song, including one featuring a church organ, but decided to strip it back to its more minimal form.

An early title to "Magic Potion" was "It's a Good Day to Be Had by All", but Howe changed it as it sounded too similar to "It Will Be a Good Day" from The Ladder (1999).

== Release ==
An update about the album came in January 2023, when Dean unveiled sketches for the cover of a new Yes album on his Facebook page. A major update arrived in the March 2023 edition of Prog magazine, which featured an interview with Howe who spoke about the album. On 10 March, Yes officially announced Mirror to the Sky on social media and their official website YesWorld, revealing the cover art, release date, and track listing. They announced that the album will be dedicated to White. On the same day, the opening track, "Cut from the Stars", was released as a digital single. The second track, "All Connected", was released as a single on 26 April.

== Reception ==
Professional ratings
Review scores
Source	Rating
Sonic Perspective	8.8/10
Classic Rock	3.5/5 stars
Riff Magazine	8/10
Spill Magazine	4.5/5

Gary Graff gave a positive review for Ultimate Classic Rock, hailing the album as "even better" than The Quest with the group adopting a more aggressive and "muscular" sound. He felt Downes was "strangely absent" from the album and considered his role as a supporting player as opposed to handling lead riffs and melodies. Nonetheless, Graff wrote the album "gives us every reason to hope this is the beginning of a prolific new era for the band." David Gill gave the album 8/10 for Riff magazine. He wrote the album sees Yes return to its golden era, creating a "remarkable piece of nostalgia" while sounding "fresh and vibrant". He praised the well-constructed arrangements and some "epic" lyrics in the title track and "Luminosity". Spill Magazine gave it a 4.5 out of 5 stating "Yes has come together to produce a strong, uplifting, and very positive album accompanied by some exceptional musicianship. Each member demonstrates what they do best. When you have an album with several songs that are over eight minutes, everyone has the chance to really shine in their own way."

== Track listing ==
Mirror to the Sky track listing
No.	Title	Writer(s)	Length
1.	"Cut from the Stars"	Jon Davison; Billy Sherwood	5:25
2.	"All Connected"	Davison; Steve Howe; Sherwood	9:02
3.	"Luminosity"	Davison; Howe; Sherwood	9:04
4.	"Living Out Their Dream"	Howe; Geoff Downes	4:45
5.	"Mirror to the Sky"	Davison; Howe	13:53
6.	"Circles of Time"	Davison	4:59
Total length:			47:08

Bonus disc
No.	Title	Writer(s)	Length
7.	"Unknown Place"	Howe	8:15
8.	"One Second Is Enough"	Howe	4:04
9.	"Magic Potion"	Howe	4:08
Total length:			16:27; 63:35

== Personnel ==
Yes

- Jon Davison – lead vocals (tracks 1, 3, 5, 6), vocals (2, 7), duet vocals (tracks 4, 8–9), acoustic guitars : [Martin MC28 (tracks 5), Taylor 714 (tracks 5, 6)]
- Steve Howe – guitars [Fender Stratocaster through analog pedalboard (track 1), Fender steel (tracks 2–5, 9), Fender Telecaster (tracks 2, 5, 9), Fender Stratocaster (track 2–4, 7, 9), Steinberger 6 string (tracks 2), Martin MC38SH (tracks 2, 4, 7, 9), Gibson ES175D (tracks 4, 6, 7, 9), Les Paul Junior (tracks 4, 7, 8), Martin MC28 and 12 String (track 5), Sho Bud Pro 1 pedal steel (tracks 6, 8), Martin SOM 45 (track 7), Kohno Model 10 classical guitar (track 7), Steinberger electric 12 string (track 8), Gibson ES Artist (track 8)], Banjo guitar [Gibson Banjo guitar (track 3)], mandolin [F4 mandolin (track 3)], autoharp (track 3), vocal duet (tracks 4, 8, 9), vocals (track 5, 7)
- Geoff Downes – organ (tracks 1–2, 4, 7–8), synthesizers (tracks 1, 3–5, 9), piano (tracks 3–5, 8–9), keyboards (tracks 2, 7), Minimoog (track 3), celeste (track 3)
- Billy Sherwood – bass guitar (1–5, 7–9), vocals (tracks 1–3, 5–7)
- Jay Schellen – drums and percussion (1–5, 7–9)

Additional musicians

- FAMES Studio Orchestra (tracks 1–3, 5, 6)
- Oleg Kondratenko – conductor (tracks 1–3, 5, 6)
- Paul K. Joyce – orchestral arrangements

Production

- Steve Howe – producer
- Curtis Schwartz – engineering, mixing
- Roger Dean – cover art, logo

== Charts ==
Chart (2023)	Peak position
Austrian Albums (Ö3 Austria)	53
Belgian Albums (Ultratop Flanders)	93
Belgian Albums (Ultratop Wallonia)	55
Dutch Albums (Album Top 100)	84
French Albums (SNEP)	99
German Albums (Offizielle Top 100)	12
Hungarian Albums (MAHASZ)	31
Italian Albums (FIMI)	61
Japanese Albums (Oricon)	24
Japanese Hot Albums (Billboard Japan)	35
Polish Albums (ZPAV)	62
Portuguese Albums (AFP)	35
Scottish Albums (Official Charts)	6
Spanish Albums (Promusicae)	99
Swiss Albums (Schweizer Hitparade)	9
UK Albums (Official Charts)	30
UK Progressive Albums (Official Charts)	1
UK Rock & Metal Albums (Official Charts)	4
US Top Album Sales (Billboard)	22
US Indie Store Album Sales (Billboard)	20
