= Ladies and Gentlemen (Lou Bega album) =

Studio album by Lou Bega
- Released: 28 May 2001
- Genre: Latin pop
- Length: 50:11
- Label: BMG
- Producer: Zippy Davids; Goar B; Axel Breitung; Donald Fact; Peter Hoff; DJ Thomilla

Lou Bega chronology
A Little Bit of Mambo (1999)	Ladies and Gentlemen (2001)	King of Mambo (2002)

Singles from Ladies and Gentlemen
- 1. "Gentleman" Released: 30 April 2001

Professional ratings
Review scores
Source	Rating
AllMusic	link
laut.de	link

Ladies and Gentlemen is the second album by Lou Bega, released in 2001.

== Track listing ==
1. "Just a Gigolo/I Ain't Got Nobody" – 3:49
2. "You Are My Sunshine" – 3:30
3. "Calling Her" – 0:52
4. "God Is a Woman" – 4:05
5. "Club Elitaire" – 5:03
6. "Money" – 3:08
7. "Lady" – 3:27
8. "Gentleman" – 3:26
9. "People Lovin' Me" – 3:51
10. "Crash" – 1:10
11. "Shit Happens" – 3:23
12. "Angelina" – 3:17
13. "Yeah Yeah" – 3:51
14. "My Answering Machine" – 0:50
15. "Lonely" – 3:39
16. "Baby Keep Smiling" (featuring Compay Segundo) – 3:36

== Credits ==
- Vocals: Lou Bega (main performer), Compay Segundo
- Producer: Frank Lio, Axel Breitung, Peter Hoff, Donald Fact, DJ Thomilla, Goar B, Zippy Davids
- Guitar: Uwe Metzler
- Keyboards: Peter Hoff, DJ Thomilla
- Harp: Andreas Vollenweider
- Horn: Till Brönner
- Horn arrangements: Till Brönner
- Backing vocals: Axel Breitung, David Whitley, Peter Hoff
- Engineering: Peter Hoff, Till Brönner
- Mixing: Peter Hoff
- Scratching: DJ Thomilla
- Cover art: Ronald Reinsberg
- Styling: Angelika M. Zwerenz

== Charts ==
Chart performance for Ladies and Gentlemen
Chart (2001)	Peak position
Austrian Albums (Ö3 Austria)	31
French Albums (SNEP)	109
German Albums (Offizielle Top 100)	54
Swiss Albums (Schweizer Hitparade)	23
