= Philbert Frog =

- Genre: Children
- Created by: Vincent James
- Written by: Phil Jackson
- Directed by: Vincent James
- Voices of: Rob Rackstraw
- Narrated by: Rob Rackstraw
- Opening theme: Philbert, Philbert the Frog!
- Composer: Paul K. Joyce
- Country of origin: United Kingdom
- Original language: English
- No. of seasons: 1
- No. of episodes: 13

Production
- Executive producer: Heather Pedley
- Producer: Vincent James
- Production location: UK
- Running time: 5 minutes

Original release
- Network: CBBC and TCC
- Release: 24 September – 17 December 1993

Philbert Frog is a British children's animated television series made by Fat City Films and produced by Heather Pedley and Philbert Frog Ltd. Created by Vincent James, it was first shown on the BBC on 24 September 1993 and ended on 17 December.

Philbert Frog is a forgetful, enthusiastic and silly frog who lives in the fictional Noggit Wood. Each episode sees him implicate himself and his pals in adventures of varying lunacy. His friends include Herbert Hedgehog, Melvin Mouse, Willie Worm (who once tried to tunnel to Mars), Monty Mole, Oscar Owl, Bertie Bird, and Tiffany Tortoise (who is quite sensible).

The series ran for 13 5-minute episodes and later aired on TCC and in several countries such as ABC in Australia.

== Episode list ==
1. Philbert Frog Super Hero (24 September 1993)
2. Philbert and the Sleepless Night (1 October 1993)
3. Philbert and the Dinosaur (8 October 1993)
4. Philbert builds a House (15 October 1993)
5. Philbert goes to the Moon (22 October 1993)
6. Philbert the Artist (29 October 1993)
7. Philbert and the Race (5 November 1993)
8. Philbert Frog and the Giant Ape (12 November 1993)
9. Exotic Frog (19 November 1993)
10. Philbert and the Swimming Adventure (26 November 1993)
11. Philbert the Detective (3 December 1993)
12. Philbert Frog forgets to Hop (10 December 1993)
13. Philbert and the Snowy Day (17 December 1993)

== Credits ==
Scripts
Phil Jackson
Animation
Mark Mason Tony Garth Animation Ltd
Storyboards and Layouts
Jez Hall, Vincent James, Paul Salmon
Backgrounds
Michelle Graney, Aileen Raistrick

== Other adaptations ==
Five spin-off books by Vincent James were published by Hazar Publishing in the same year.

- Philbert Frog — The Naughty Cousin
- Philbert Frog — The Wishing Wand
- Philbert Frog Loses his Memory
- Philbert Frog — The Sunny Day
