= Can We Fix It? =

Theme song of television programme Bob the Builder

Single by Neil Morrissey as Bob the Builder

from the album Bob the Builder: The Album
- B-side: "Bob's Line Dance"
- Released: 4 December 2000
- Genre: Children's; novelty
- Length: 3:09
- Label: BBC
- Songwriter: Paul K. Joyce
- Producer: Grant Mitchell

Bob the Builder singles chronology
"Can We Fix It?" (2000)	"Mambo No. 5" (2001)

"Can We Fix It?" is the theme song from the British children's animated television programme Bob the Builder. It was written by Paul K. Joyce and produced by Hot Animation. Vocals on the song are provided by Neil Morrissey, who voiced Bob at the time of the track's recording. It was released as a single on 4 December 2000 in the United Kingdom.

"Can We Fix It?" became the UK Christmas number-one single of 2000, beating Westlife's "What Makes a Man" to the top spot and ending the group's run of seven consecutive number-one singles. It was the biggest-selling single of 2000 in the United Kingdom, appearing at number 10 on the decade-end chart in 2009. The song has sold over one million copies in the United Kingdom according to the Official Charts Company. In August 2001, the song was released in Australia and reached number one that September, becoming the ninth-best-selling single of the year there.

A second single by Bob the Builder, "Mambo No. 5", with the lyrics adapted from Lou Bega's 1999 hit version, also reached number one on the UK chart in September 2001. An album entitled The Album followed, which debuted at number four on the UK Albums Chart.

== Critical reception ==
The song was rated 8/10 by Stylus Magazine, saying "kids TV themes getting to number one is a thing to be savoured, especially when a), it stops pretentious tosh like "Stan" from reigning at the top of the charts and b), when it actually has a much better 2-step beat than any of the garage number ones from the previous 18 months."

NME named it one of the worst songs of the 2000s. Staff writer Jamie Milton said: "When you become a parent, you tacitly sign up to watch an endless amount of children's TV. [...] But nothing excuses a throwaway, novelty kids TV song about a builder fixing things, managing to shift over a million copies, becoming the highest-selling song of 2000 and the first Christmas number one of the '00s. There's innocent fun, and then there's ruining a new millennium before it's barely begun." Milton said the worst part of the song was its "constant, cheap garage beat, the audio equivalent of someone drilling a hole in your conscience."

== Track listings ==
UK and Australian CD single

1. "Can We Fix It?"
2. "Bob's Line Dance"
3. "Can We Fix It?" (karaoke version)
4. "Can We Fix It?" (video)

UK cassette single

1. "Can We Fix It?"
2. "Bob's Line Dance"

== Personnel ==
Personnel are adapted from the UK cassette single sleeve.

- Paul K. Joyce – writing
- Neil Morrissey – vocals
- Grant Mitchell – production, arrangement
- Graham Dickson – mixing, engineering

== Charts ==
=== Weekly charts ===
Chart (2000–2001)	Peak position
Australia (ARIA)	1
Europe (Eurochart Hot 100)	6
Ireland (IRMA)	3
Scottish Singles Sales (Official Charts)	1
UK Singles (Official Charts)	1
UK Indie (Official Charts)	1

=== Year-end charts ===
Chart (2000)	Position
Ireland (IRMA)	41
UK Singles (OCC)	1

Chart (2001)	Position
Australia (ARIA)	9
Europe (Eurochart Hot 100)	90
Ireland (IRMA)	67
UK Singles (OCC)	72

=== Decade-end charts ===
Chart (2000–2009)	Position
UK Singles (OCC)	10

== Certifications ==
Region	Certification	Certified units/sales
Australia (ARIA)	2× Platinum	140,000^{^}
United Kingdom (BPI)	Platinum	600,000^{^}
^{^} Shipments figures based on certification alone.

== Release history ==
Region	Date	Format(s)	Label(s)	Ref(s).
United Kingdom	4 December 2000	BBC	CD; cassette	
Australia	13 August 2001	BBC; Universal Music Australia	CD	
