= Luis Kalaff =

- Born: Luis Kalaff Pérez; October 16, 1916; Pimentel, Duarte, Dominican Republic
- Died: July 2, 2010 (aged 93) Santo Domingo, Dominican Republic
- Genres: merengue
- Occupations: Singer, composer, guitarist, songwriter
- Instruments: Vocals, guitar
- Years active: 1939-2010

Luis Kalaff (October 11, 1916-July 2, 2010) was a Dominican singer, composer and guitarist.

== Life and career ==
His father, Juan Kalaf, was of Lebanese origins. His mother was Bernavelina Perez.

He joined the band "Los Alegeres Dominicanos" and at some time traveled to the United States. Through a contract with Peer International Corp. he had joined an American record label. Ballroom Dance Magazine described him as being proficient in merengue music. Deborah Pancini Hernández, author of Bachata: A Social History of a Dominican Popular Music, described him as "popular".

In 1958 he moved to New York City.

Kalaff used boogaloo and merengue as influences in his work. Other artists like Celia Cruz and Julio Iglesias began playing songs written by Kalaff. The Dominican Studies Institute of City University of New York stated that Kalaff "popularized típico merengue in New York during the 1950s". In 2000, Kalaff was inducted into the International Latin Music Hall of Fame.
