= Tricky, Tricky =

Single by Lou Bega

from the album A Little Bit of Mambo
- Released: 7 December 1999
- Genre: Latin pop
- Length: 3:17 (radio version); 5:10 (extended mix)
- Label: Lautstark; BMG; RCA
- Songwriter(s): Lou Bega; Zippy Davids; Frank Lio; Donald Fact
- Producer(s): Goar B; Frank Lio; Donald Fact

Lou Bega singles chronology
"I Got a Girl" (1999)	"Tricky, Tricky" (1999)	"Mambo Mambo" (2000)

"Tricky, Tricky" is a song released by Lou Bega in 1999 from his debut album A Little Bit of Mambo. It charted on the US Billboard Hot 100 and Sweden, though was overshadowed by the hit "Mambo No. 5". The lyrics tell of a woman that likes to spend a lot of money, and how the relationship between her and a man will not work.

== Track listing ==
Maxi single

1. "Tricky, Tricky" (Radio Version) – 3:17
2. "Tricky, Tricky" (Extended Mix) – 5:10
3. "Tricky, Tricky" (Tricky Club Mix) – 5:28
4. "Tricky, Tricky" (Instrumental) – 3:17

== Charts ==
Chart performance for "Tricky, Tricky"
Chart (2000)	Peak position
Canada (Nielsen SoundScan)	18
Sweden (Sverigetopplistan)	55
US Billboard Hot 100	74
US Pop Airplay (Billboard)	20
