= I Got a Girl (Lou Bega song) =

1999 single by Lou Bega

Single by Lou Bega

from the album A Little Bit of Mambo
- Released: 30 August 1999
- Length: 3:04 (radio version); 5:02 (extended mix)
- Label: Lautstark; BMG; RCA
- Songwriters: Lou Bega; Zippy Davids; Frank Lio; Donald Fact
- Producers: Goar B; Frank Lio; Donald Fact

Lou Bega singles chronology
"Mambo No. 5" (1999)	"I Got a Girl" (1999)	"Tricky, Tricky" (1999)

Music video
- "I Got a Girl" on YouTube

"I Got a Girl" is a song by German singer Lou Bega. The single was the successor to his greatest hit "Mambo No. 5" and released as the second single from his debut album, A Little Bit of Mambo (1999). In the song, Bega tells that "he's got girlfriends all over the world." It was certified gold in Sweden.

== Track listing ==
- Maxi single
1. "I Got a Girl" (radio version) – 3:04
2. "I Got a Girl" (original radio version) – 3:21
3. "I Got a Girl" (extended mix) – 5:02
4. "I Got a Girl" (club mix) – 5:31
5. "I Got a Girl" (instrumental version) – 3:04

== Charts ==
=== Weekly charts ===
1999–2000 weekly chart performance for "I Got a Girl"
Chart (1999–2000)	Peak position
Australia (ARIA)	31
Austria (Ö3 Austria Top 40)	19
Belgium (Ultratop 50 Flanders)	9
Belgium (Ultratop 50 Wallonia)	13
Europe Radio Top 50 (Music & Media)	29
Europe Border Breakers (Music & Media)	1
Finland (Suomen virallinen lista)	2
France (SNEP)	5
Germany (GfK)	19
Ireland (IRMA)	23
Italy (FIMI)	25
Italy Airplay (Music & Media)	5
Netherlands (Dutch Top 40)	26
Netherlands (Single Top 100)	31
New Zealand (Recorded Music NZ)	48
Sweden (Sverigetopplistan)	12
Switzerland (Schweizer Hitparade)	20
UK Singles (Official Charts)	55

2026 weekly chart performance for "I Got a Girl"
Chart (2026)	Peak position
Moldova Airplay (TopHit)	36

=== Monthly charts ===
Monthly chart performance for "I Got a Girl"
Chart (2025)	Peak position
Moldova Airplay (TopHit)	76

=== Year-end charts ===
1999 year-end chart performance for "I Got a Girl"
Chart (1999)	Position
Europe Border Breakers (Music & Media)	20
Sweden (Hitlistan)	74

2000 year-end chart performance for "I Got a Girl"
Chart (2000)	Position
Europe Border Breakers (Music & Media)	41
France (SNEP)	56

== Certifications ==
Certifications for "I Got a Girl"
Region	Certification	Certified units/sales
Sweden (GLF)	Gold	15,000^{^}
^{^} Shipments figures based on certification alone.
