= Vilma von Webenau =

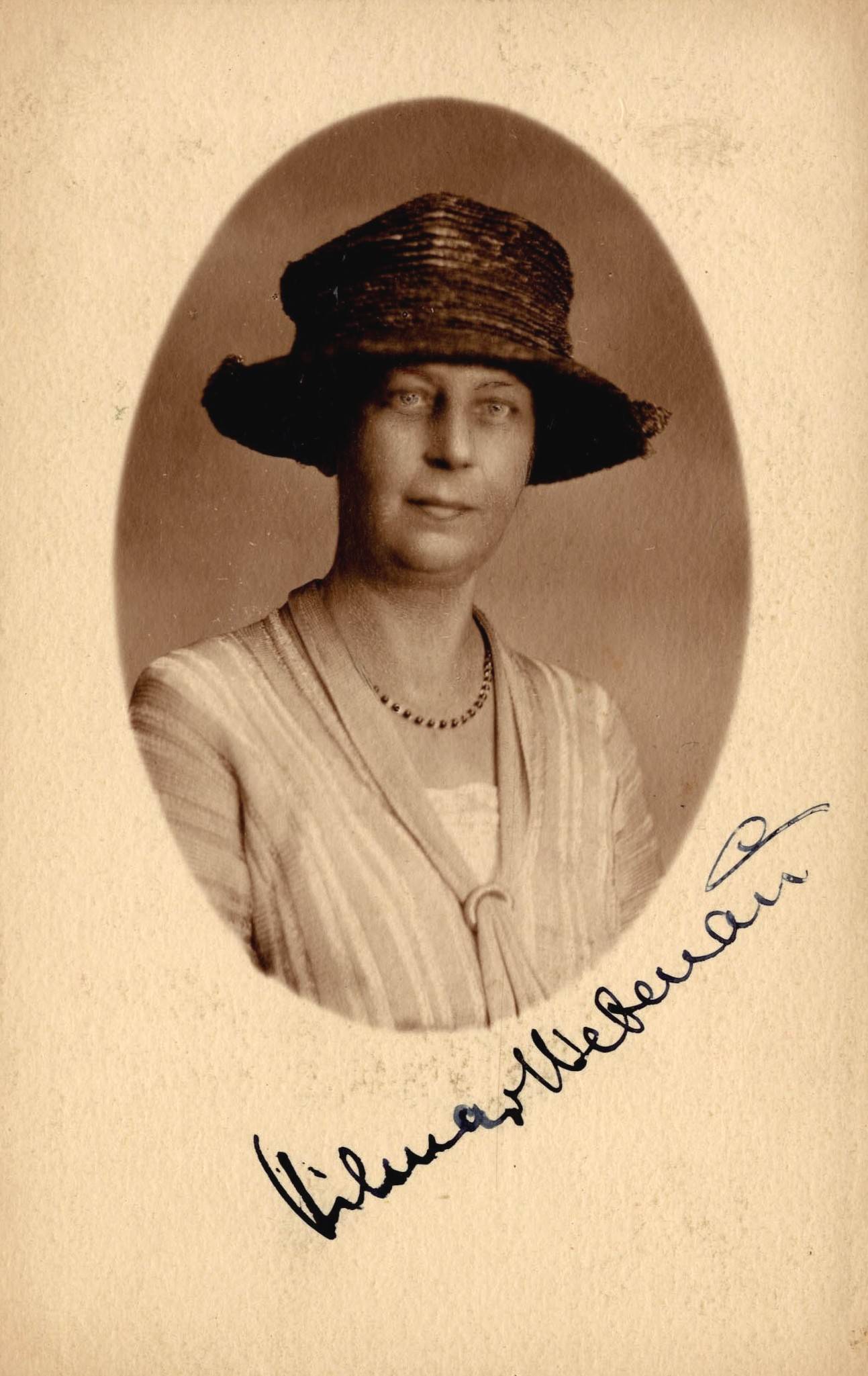
Vilma von Webenau

Vilma von Webenau, (born 15 February 1875 in Constantinople; died 9 October 1953 in Vienna), composer, first student of Arnold Schoenberg, granddaughter of Julie von Webenau, daughter of Arthur Weber Edler von Webenau, k. & k. counsellor in Constantinople.
