= Syndicate Musicproduction =

Syndicate Music Production

Background information
- Origin: Munich, Bavaria, Germany
- Genres: Pop, rock, film music, advertising
- Occupation: Record producers
- Years active: 1993–present
- Members: Achim Kleist a.k.a. Frank Lio; Wolfgang von Webenau a.k.a. D.Fact
- Website: syndicatemusic.de

Syndicate Music Production was founded in 1993 by the German producer and songwriter Achim Kleist (a.k.a. Frank Lio). In 1998, he was joined by partner Wolfgang von Webenau (a.k.a. D. Fact). The company's headquarters and studios are located near Munich (Germany), where productions and compositions for pop, rock, film and advertising are produced. Syndicate Musicproduction's biggest success was with the single "Mambo No.5" by Lou Bega and the follow-up album "A Little Bit Of Mambo". It went on to sell more than 20 million copies.

== Success Story ==
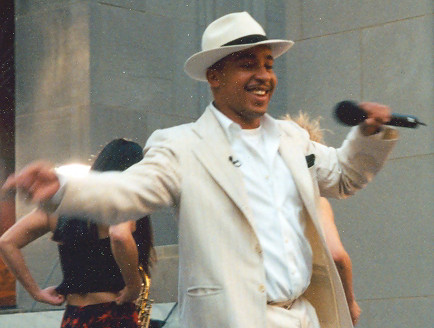
Lou Bega (1999)

Syndicate Music has received over 60 gold and platinum awards for its various productions and has had more than 70 Top 10 hits in the international charts. Achim Kleist and Wolfgang von Webenau were both nominated for the German Echo Award in 2000 as best producers. Their roster of artists were honoured with awards such as the Latin Music Award, the World Music Award and the Echo, as well as a Grammy nomination for Lou Bega.

== Artists ==
The Syndicate team has written and produced e.g. for following artists:

- Lou Bega
- Worlds Apart
- DJ Bobo
- DJ Ötzi
- Right Said Fred
- Compay Segundo from the Buena Vista Social Club

== Film Music ==
Their work can be found in the following films:

- Madagascar (DreamWorks)
- Stuart Little (Sony Pictures)
- Just Visiting (Buena Vista)

or in TV series such as:

- Ally McBeal
- Lizzie McGuire
- The Simpsons
- The Office (U.S. TV series)
