= A Little Bit of Mambo =

Studio album by Lou Bega
- Released: 19 July 1999
- Recorded: 1999
- Genres: Latin pop; mambo
- Length: 43:04
- Labels: Lautstark; BMG; RCA
- Producers: Frank Lio; Goar B; Donald Fact

Lou Bega chronology
A Little Bit of Mambo (1999)	Ladies and Gentlemen (2001)

Alternative cover
- French edition

Singles from A Little Bit of Mambo
- 1. "Mambo No. 5 (A Little Bit Of...)" Released: 19 April 1999; 2. "I Got a Girl" Released: 30 August 1999; 3. "Tricky, Tricky" Released: 7 December 1999; 4. "Mambo Mambo" Released: 5 June 2000

Professional ratings
Review scores
Source	Rating
AllMusic	3/5 stars
Entertainment Weekly	B+
Los Angeles Daily News	2.5/4 stars
Los Angeles Times	1.5/4 stars
The Village Voice	(choice cut)

A Little Bit of Mambo is the debut studio album by German singer Lou Bega. It was released on 19 July 1999 through Lautstark. The album and Bega's career were propelled by the success of the single "Mambo No. 5 (A Little Bit Of...)", which became an international hit and reached No. 1 in several countries.

== Track listing ==
International edition track listing
No.	Title	Length
1.	"Mambo No. 5 (A Little Bit Of...)"	3:39
2.	"Baby Keep Smiling"	3:10
3.	"Lou's Café"	0:59
4.	"Can I Tico Tico You"	2:52
5.	"I Got a Girl"	3:13
6.	"Tricky, Tricky"	3:24
7.	"Icecream"	3:48
8.	"Beauty on the TV-Screen"	4:03
9.	"1+1=2"	4:02
10.	"The Most Expensive Girl in the World"	3:44
11.	"The Trumpet Part II"	6:03
12.	"Behind Stage"	1:17
13.	"Mambo Mambo"	3:00

- The Japanese edition has "Mambo No. 5 (A Little Bit Of...)" (Light Mix) as track 14, featuring Stephen Powell.

French edition track listing
No.	Title	Length
1.	"Mambo Mambo" (radio version)	3:00
2.	"Mambo No. 5 (A Little Bit Of...)"	3:39
3.	"Baby Keep Smiling"	3:10
4.	"Lou's Cafe"	0:59
5.	"Can I Tico Tico You"	2:52
6.	"I Got a Girl"	3:13
7.	"Tricky, Tricky"	3:24
8.	"Icecream"	3:48
9.	"Beauty on the TV-Screen"	4:03
10.	"1+1=2"	4:02
11.	"The Most Expensive Girl in the World"	3:44
12.	"The Trumpet"	6:03
13.	"Behind Stage"	1:17
14.	"Mambo Mambo" (original version)	4:00

== Personnel ==
All music and lyrics by Lou Bega, Zippy Davids, Frank Lio and Donald Fact, except: Track 1 – "Mambo No. 5 (A Little Bit Of...)": music by Pérez Prado, lyrics by Lou Bega and Zippy Davids; Track 4 – "Can I Tico Tico You": music by Zequinha Abreu, lyrics by Lou Bega, Zippy Davids, Frank Lio and Donald Fact.

- Vocals: Lou Bega (main performer)
- Producer: Goar B, Frank Lio, Donald Fact
- Guitar: Goar B, Matthias Borst
- Piano: Donald Fact, Frank Lio, Mickey O'Connell
- Electronic keyboard: Donald Fact, Frank Lio
- Brass: Claus Reichstaller, Axel Kuhn, Hans Bettinger, Felice Civitareale, Black II Black
- Organ: Stefan Schrupp
- Harmonica: Christofer Kochs
- Harp: Christofer Kochs, Erik Uher
- Percussion: Zippy Davids
- Background vocals: Zippy Davids
- Audio mastering: Leon Zervos
- Speaking: Lisa Cash, Kai Taschner
- Cover art: Ronald Reinsberg, Stefano Boragno, Gabo, Angelika M. Zwerenz, Lou Bega
- Styling: Angelika M. Zwerenz, Munich

== Charts ==
=== Weekly charts ===
Weekly chart performance for A Little Bit of Mambo
Chart (1999–2000)	Peak position
Australian Albums (ARIA)	19
Austrian Albums (Ö3 Austria)	1
Belgian Albums (Ultratop Flanders)	17
Belgian Albums (Ultratop Wallonia)	43
Canadian Albums (Billboard)	1
Dutch Albums (Album Top 100)	17
Finnish Albums (Suomen virallinen lista)	1
French Albums (SNEP)	8
German Albums (Offizielle Top 100)	3
Hungarian Albums (MAHASZ)	1
New Zealand Albums (RMNZ)	28
Norwegian Albums (VG-lista)	3
Scottish Albums (Official Charts)	91
Swedish Albums (Sverigetopplistan)	20
Swiss Albums (Schweizer Hitparade)	1
UK Albums (Official Charts)	50
US Billboard 200	3

=== Year-end charts ===
1999 year-end chart performance for A Little Bit of Mambo
Chart (1999)	Position
Australian Albums (ARIA)	53
Austrian Albums (Ö3 Austria)	15
German Albums (Offizielle Top 100)	47
Swiss Albums (Schweizer Hitparade)	23
US Billboard 200	61

2000 year-end chart performance for A Little Bit of Mambo
Chart (2000)	Position
Canadian Albums (Nielsen SoundScan)	116
French Albums (SNEP)	63
US Billboard 200	36

== Certifications ==
Certifications for A Little Bit of Mambo
Region	Certification	Certified units/sales
Australia (ARIA)	Platinum	70,000^{^}
Austria (IFPI Austria)	Gold	25,000^{*}
Canada (Music Canada)	5× Platinum	500,000^{^}
France (SNEP)	2× Gold	200,000^{*}
Germany (BVMI)	Gold	250,000^{^}
Mexico (AMPROFON)	Platinum+Gold	225,000^{^}
Singapore (RIAS)	Gold	7,500
Spain (Promusicae)	Gold	50,000^{^}
Switzerland (IFPI Switzerland)	Platinum	50,000^{^}
United States (RIAA)	3× Platinum	3,300,000
Summaries
Europe (IFPI)	Platinum	1,000,000^{*}
^{*} Sales figures based on certification alone.^{^} Shipments figures based on certification alone.
