= Gentleman (Lou Bega song) =

Single by Lou Bega

from the album Ladies and Gentlemen
- Released: April 30, 2001
- Genre: Latin pop
- Length: 3:40
- Label: Unicade Music / BMG
- Songwriters: Axel Breitung; Lou Bega; Zippy Davids
- Producers: Goar B Axel Breitung; Zippy Davids; Peter Hoff

Lou Bega singles chronology
"Mambo Mambo" (2000)	"Gentleman" (2001)	"Just a Gigolo / I Ain't Got Nobody" (2001)

"Gentleman" is a song by Lou Bega. It was the first single from his album Ladies and Gentlemen.

In fact, the song "Gentleman" is a parody, because a real gentleman doesn't claim to be a gentleman. The song is about gentlemen nowadays, how to become a gentleman and how to become entitled to be a gentleman.

— Lou Bega on the song "Gentleman"

== Chart performance ==
Chart (2001)	Peak position
Austria	16
France	54
Germany	35
Poland	30
Switzerland	62

== Track listing ==
Maxi single

1. "Gentleman" (Radio Edit) - 3:40
2. "Gentleman" (Alternative Radio Edit) - 3:40
3. "Gentleman" (Latin Version) - 3:41
4. "Club Elitaire" (Album Version) - 5:05
5. "Soon" (Short Cuts from the Forthcoming Lou Bega Album) - 3:40
