= Julie von Webenau =

German-Austrian composer (1813–1887)

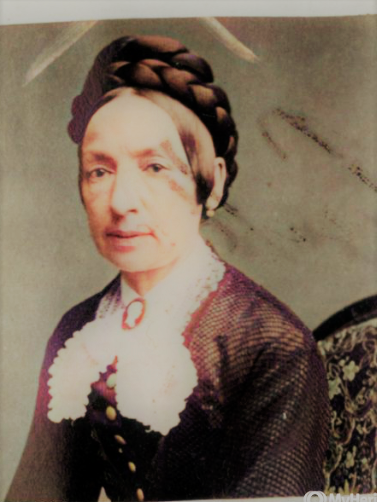
- Julie von Webenau in 1887
- Born: Julie Baroni-Cavalcabò; October 16, 1813; Lemberg, Austrian Empire (today part of Ukraine)
- Died: July 2, 1887 (aged 73); Graz, Austria
- Occupation: composer
- Spouses: Arthur Weber Edler von Webenau (1838–1841); Johann Alois Ritter von Britto (1842–1877)
- Relatives: Vilma von Webenau (granddaughter)

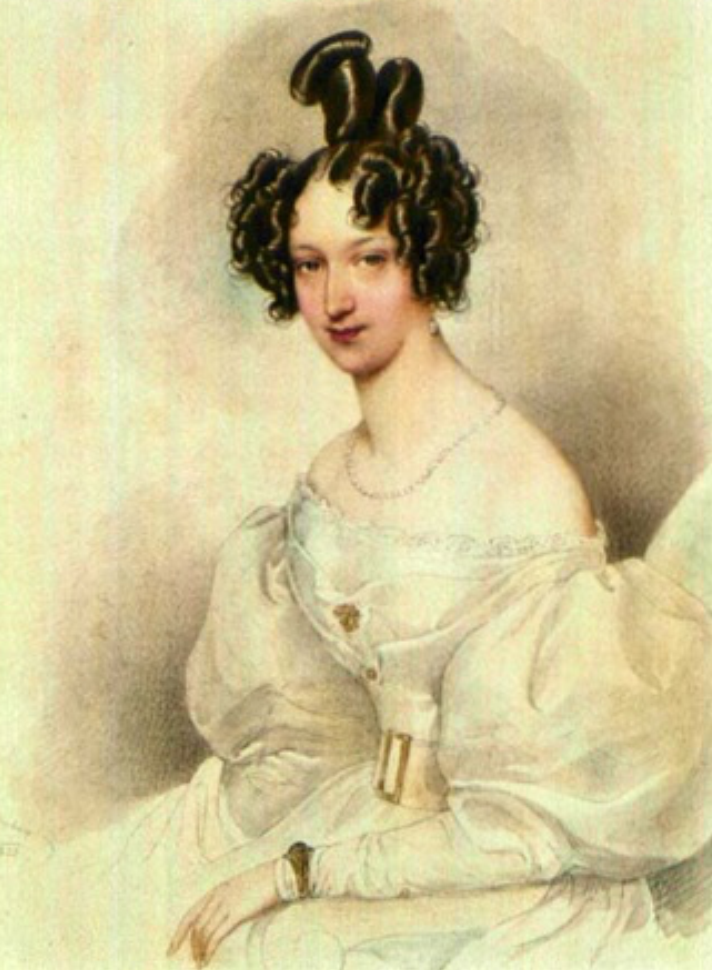
von Webenau depicted in a portrait by Josef Kriehuber

Julie von Webenau (née Baroni-Cavalcabò; October 16, 1813 – July 2, 1887) was a German-Austrian composer.

== Life ==
von Webenau was born to the government council member Ludwig Cajetan Baroni-Cavalcabò (1765-1847) and the amateur singer Josephine Baroni-Cavalcabò (1788-1860) in Lemberg, Austrian Empire (modern-day Lviv, Ukraine). She had a sister, Laura, and a brother, Adolf. In Lemberg, she was a student of Franz Xaver Wolfgang Mozart, of whom her mother had a close relationship with. Under Mozart's tutelage, she published her first songs under her maiden name. Mozart took her to Leipzig to further continue her education, and eventually introduced her to composer and pianist Robert Schumann in 1835. Schumann championed von Webenau's work, as he dedicated his Humoresque op. 20 to von Webenau in 1839 as well as his other compositions L'Adieu et le Retour and Morceaux de Fantaisie pour Pianoforte op. 25 to Schumann, the latter of which was published in March 1840.

== Personal life ==
On March 29, 1838, in Lemberg, she married Wilhelm Weber Edler von Webenau (1796–1841), a lawyer and member of the legislative court commission in Vienna. She moved to Vienna with Wilhelm in the same year. The couple had a son, Arthur Weber Edler von Webenau, who became the imperial and royal embassy counselor in Constantinople. Wilhelm died on August 16, 1841.

In July 1842, she married Johann Alois Ritter von Britto, a Brazilian Legation Secretary, in the St. Stephen's Cathedral in Vienna. The couple had two daughters and a son. von Britto died in 1877, after which von Webenau lived with her sister, Laura.

Her granddaughter was the composer Vilma von Webenau.

== Music ==
- op. 1 - Variation for piano (May 1830)
- op. 2 - Caprice for piano No. 1
- op. 3 - Piano Sonata in E flat major, published by Breitkopf & Härtel, Leipzig, 1830
- op. 4 - Fantasy in C minor for piano
- op.5 - Introduction et Rondeau for piano (December 1830)
- op. 6 - Die Grabesrose for bass, baritone or alto ("You Grabesrose rooted well"), poem by Anastasius Grün from the sheets of love (November 1837)
- op.8 - Allegro di Bravura for piano (July 1834)
- op. 9 - Farewell!, Poem by Heinrich Heine ("Beautiful cradle of my sorrows"), dedicated to the singer Francilla Pixis (December 1836)
- op. 10 - Three German songs, published by Friedrich Hofmeister, Leipzig 1836
- op. 11 - The Unnamed, poem by Johann Ludwig Uhland ("On the summit of a mountain") (May 1838)
- op.12 - Capriccio No. 2 in A major for piano, dedicated to Sigismund Thalberg (February 1837)
- op. 13 - Equestrian song for bass or baritone ("We walk through life") (May 1837)
- op. 15 - Dispute and Atonement, duet for soprano and bass ("Schnür 'Dein Bund because for hiking"), text by Karl Simrock (November 1837)
- op. 16 - Il rimprovero, song in A flat minor, text by Iacopo Vittorelli, self-published, undated
- op. 17 - It sails gently on silver waves, text by Anastasius Grün (from the leaves of love ) (November 1838)
- op.18 - Caprice for piano No. 3 (February 1838), published by Pietro Mechetti quondam Carlo, Vienna 1838
- op.19 - Fantasy in E minor for piano, published by Artaria, Vienna 1838
- op. 21 - The young man and the nymph ("He stood there pensively, at the hot spring") (April 1838)
- op. 22 - Why?, Lied in D flat major, text by Ludwig Bechstein (“You ask why only complaints”), published by Anton Diabelli, Vienna 1838
- op. 23 - Your picture, text by Franz Freiherr von Dingelstedt, Vienna 1839
- op. 24 - To the Swallows (August 1842)
- op. 25 - L'Adieu et le Retour. Morceaux de Fantaisie pour Pianoforte, dedicated to Robert Schumann (March 1840)
- op. 26 - Au Bord du Lac, Morceau de Salon (May 1843)
- op. 27 - Nocturne (October 1843)
- op. 28 - Morceaux de Salon (September 1844)
- op. 29 - Barcarolle for piano
- op. 30 Two songs, published by AO Witzendorf, Vienna, undated
- Shepherd's Lament, poem by Johann Wolfgang von Goethe, Vienna 1829
- La Chasse
- Own railway (August 1840)
- Ask the moon, cycle of four songs Julie of Webenaus (Why?, Resteigne train, The Modest, The Lead Cherin Night Song), orchestrated by Catherine Blassnigg, Monika Ciernia, Philipp Hribernig and Stefano Penzo (UA Vienna in 2013 by the Academic Symphony Orchestra of the University of Economics, Lt. George Jackson).
