= Mambo No. 5 =

1949 instrumental mambo song by Dámaso Pérez Prado

Song by Pérez Prado
- Released: 1950
- Recorded: 1949
- Genre: Mambo; jive
- Length: 2:48
- Songwriter: Dámaso Pérez Prado

"Mambo No. 5" is an instrumental mambo and jazz dance song originally composed and recorded by Cuban musician Dámaso Pérez Prado in 1949 and released the next year. German singer Lou Bega sampled the original for a new song released under the same name on his 1999 debut album, A Little Bit of Mambo. In 2026, Pérez Prado's original recording of the song was selected by the Library of Congress for preservation in the National Recording Registry for its "cultural, historical or aesthetic importance in the nation's recorded sound heritage."

== Lou Bega version ==
"Mambo No. 5 (A Little Bit Of...)"

Single by Lou Bega

from the album A Little Bit of Mambo
- Released: 19 April 1999
- Genre: Latin pop; dance-pop
- Length: 5:14 (extended version); 3:39 (album version)
- Label: Ariola; RCA
- Songwriters: Lou Bega; Dámaso Pérez Prado; Zippy Davids
- Producers: Goar B; Frank Lio; Donald Fact; Peter Meisel

Lou Bega singles chronology
"Mambo No. 5 (A Little Bit Of...)" (1999)	"I Got a Girl" (1999)

Music video
- "Mambo No. 5" on YouTube

German singer Lou Bega recorded a cover of the song and released it in April 1999 as the first single from his debut album, A Little Bit of Mambo (1999). His version became a summer hit during 1999 in most of Europe. Later that year, it experienced success in the United Kingdom, North America, and Oceania. In France, it set a record by staying at number one for 20 weeks. The song reached number three on the US Billboard Hot 100 on 2 November 1999, giving Bega his only top-40 and top-ten hit in the United States. Radio play made up most of the track's performance on the chart, as the song was released as a vinyl single and vinyl maxi-single but not as a CD single or cassette single during its chart run. The Lou Bega version was number-one on the Hot 100's component chart for airplay for six weeks. Meanwhile, a knock-off cover from "Latin Lou and the Mambo All Stars" made the top 40 on the chart for sales, reaching number 33.

=== Critical reception ===
Elisabeth Vincentelli from Entertainment Weekly rated the song with a B minus, adding, "All of a sudden, mambo is hot again, and the unlikely city of Munich is on the Latin-music map. For this we have to thank the Ugandan-Italian Bega and his German producing team, who have hit pay dirt by tacking new lyrics onto an old Pérez Prado song. While purists scream murder, the upbeat tune and bouncy, '80s-style synthesizers will rule weddings for years to come."

=== Copyright dispute ===
The song became the subject of a seven-year copyright trial between Prado's estate, the music publisher Peermusic, and Bega's producers. Bega had only used riffs (which by German law cannot be registered for copyright) from Prado's original and written the entire lyrics, so Bega's producers went to court in order to gain access to all the song's proceedings from Peermusic representing Prado's estate. However, after seven years the Federal Court of Justice of Germany ruled in favor of Peermusic and Prado's estate in 2008, based upon the fact that Bega's producers had sought a royalty agreement with Peermusic prior to releasing the song. Because of Bega's significant contributions to his version, the court's final ruling declared it a new song co-written by Prado and Bega.

=== Music video ===
The accompanying music video for "Mambo No. 5", directed by Joern Heitmann, features Lou Bega singing and dancing with flappers. An alternate music video aired on Disney Channel, featuring clips from various Disney films and television series, with newly recorded lyrics by Bega dealing with the featured characters.

=== Disney Mambo #5 ===
Lou Bega also recorded a version of the song for Walt Disney Records, titled "Disney Mambo #5", which was released in February 2000. The lyrics were rewritten to be more child-friendly, replacing the girls' names with those of characters like Mickey Mouse, Minnie Mouse and Goofy, as well as altering references to sex and alcohol. The song was released on the albums Radio Disney Jams, Vol. 2 and La Vida Mickey.

A music video was also created for play on Disney Channel, featuring Bega performing the song with a jazz ensemble interspersed with footage of Mickey and his friends from the Mickey Mouse Works TV show. It was also shown theatrically in front of Disney's The Tigger Movie, and was later included on the VHS/DVD releases of Fun and Fancy Free and A Goofy Movie.

=== Track listings ===
- CD single
1. "Mambo No. 5" (radio edit) – 3:39
2. "Mambo No. 5" (extended mix) – 5:14
3. "Mambo No. 5" (enhanced CD-ROM video) – 3:42
- Maxi single
1. "Mambo No. 5" (radio edit) – 3:39
2. "Mambo No. 5" (extended mix) – 5:14
3. "Mambo" (Havanna club mix) – 5:48
4. "Mambo" (The Trumpet) – 6:01
- 7-inch 45 rpm single
1. "Mambo No. 5" (radio edit) – 3:39
2. "Beauty on the TV-Screen" – 4:03

=== Charts ===
==== Weekly charts ====
Weekly chart performance for "Mambo No. 5 (A Little Bit Of...)"
Chart (1999)	Peak position
Australia (ARIA)	1
Austria (Ö3 Austria Top 40)	1
Belgium (Ultratop 50 Flanders)	1
Belgium (Ultratop 50 Wallonia)	1
Canada (Nielsen SoundScan)	1
Canada CHR (Nielsen BDS)	1
Canada Top Singles (RPM)	1
Canada Adult Contemporary (RPM)	1
Canada Dance/Urban (RPM)	1
Czech Republic (IFPI)	1
Denmark (Tracklisten)	1
Europe (European Hot 100)	1
Finland (Suomen virallinen lista)	1
France (SNEP)	1
Germany (GfK)	1
Greece (IFPI)	1
Hungary (Mahasz)	1
Iceland (Íslenski Listinn Topp 40)	1
Ireland (IRMA)	1
Italy (Musica e dischi)	1
Italy Airplay (Music & Media)	1
Netherlands (Dutch Top 40)	1
Netherlands (Single Top 100)	1
New Zealand (Recorded Music NZ)	1
Norway (VG-lista)	1
Spain (Promusicae)	1
Scottish Singles Sales (Official Charts)	1
Sweden (Sverigetopplistan)	1
Switzerland (Schweizer Hitparade)	1
UK Singles (Official Charts)	1
US Billboard Hot 100	3
US Adult Contemporary (Billboard)	26
US Adult Pop Airplay (Billboard)	2
US Dance Singles Sales (Billboard)	26
US Pop Airplay (Billboard)	1
US Rhythmic Airplay (Billboard)	1
US Top 40 Tracks (Billboard)	1

==== Year-end charts ====
1999 year-end chart performance for "Mambo No. 5 (A Little Bit Of...)"
Chart (1999)	Position
Australia (ARIA)	1
Austria (Ö3 Austria Top 40)	1
Belgium (Ultratop 50 Flanders)	2
Belgium (Ultratop 50 Wallonia)	4
Brazil (Crowley)	14
Canada Top Singles (RPM)	7
Canada Adult Contemporary (RPM)	22
Canada Dance/Urban (RPM)	6
Europe (Eurochart Hot 100)	2
Europe Airplay (Radio Top 50)	4
Europe Border Breakers (Media & Media)	2
France (SNEP)	1
Germany (Media Control)	1
Netherlands (Dutch Top 40)	4
Netherlands (Single Top 100)	1
New Zealand (RIANZ)	1
Romania (Romanian Top 100)	3
Spain (AFYVE)	1
Sweden (Hitlistan)	6
Switzerland (Schweizer Hitparade)	1
UK Singles (OCC)	4
UK Airplay (Music Week)	32
US Billboard Hot 100	42
US Adult Top 40 (Billboard)	30
US Mainstream Top 40 (Billboard)	19
US Rhythmic Top 40 (Billboard)	38

2000 year-end chart performance for "Mambo No. 5 (A Little Bit Of...)"
Chart (2000)	Position
Europe (Eurochart Hot 100)	86
France (SNEP)	82
US Adult Top 40 (Billboard)	53
US Mainstream Top 40 (Billboard)	70

==== Decade-end charts ====
Decade-end chart performance for "Mambo No. 5 (A Little Bit Of...)"
Chart (1990–1999)	Position
Austria (Ö3 Austria Top 40)	39
Belgium (Ultratop 50 Flanders)	37
Canada (Nielsen SoundScan)	18
Netherlands (Dutch Top 40)	23

=== Certifications and sales ===
Certifications for "Mambo No. 5 (A Little Bit Of...)"
Region	Certification	Certified units/sales
Australia (ARIA)	4× Platinum	280,000^{^}
Austria (IFPI Austria)	2× Platinum	100,000^{*}
Belgium (BRMA)	3× Platinum	150,000^{*}
Denmark (IFPI Danmark)	Platinum	90,000^{‡}
France (SNEP)	Diamond	1,500,000
Germany (BVMI)	7× Gold	2,100,000^{‡}
Italy	—	150,000
Italy (FIMI) sales since 2009	Gold	35,000^{‡}
Mexico (AMPROFON)	3× Platinum+Gold	210,000^{‡}
Netherlands (NVPI)	Platinum	75,000^{^}
New Zealand (RMNZ)	3× Platinum	30,000^{*}
New Zealand (RMNZ) Reissue	3× Platinum	90,000^{‡}
Spain (Promusicae) Physical release	Gold	25,000^{^}
Spain (Promusicae) Digital release	Platinum	60,000^{‡}
Sweden (GLF)	3× Platinum	90,000^{^}
Switzerland (IFPI Switzerland)	2× Platinum	100,000^{^}
United Kingdom (BPI) 1999 release	Platinum	850,000
United Kingdom (BPI) 2010 release	3× Platinum	1,800,000^{‡}
United States	—	3,100,000
^{*} Sales figures based on certification alone.^{^} Shipments figures based on certification alone.^{‡} Sales+streaming figures based on certification alone.

=== Release history ===
Release dates and formats for "Mambo No. 5 (A Little Bit Of...)"
Region	Date	Format(s)	Label(s)	Ref.
Germany	19 April 1999	CD	Ariola	
Finland	10 May 1999	CD	Lautstark; BMG	
Sweden	10 May 1999	CD	Lautstark; BMG	
United States	17 August 1999	12-inch vinyl	RCA	
United Kingdom	23 August 1999	CD; cassette	RCA	
Japan	22 September 1999	CD	Lautstark; BMG	

== Bob the Builder version ==
"Mambo No. 5"

Single by Bob the Builder

from the album Bob the Builder: The Album
- B-side: "Super Spud" (Spud's dub)
- Released: 3 September 2001
- Length: 3:25 (album version); 3:14 (radio edit)
- Label: BBC
- Songwriter: Paul K. Joyce
- Producer: Grant Mitchell

Bob the Builder singles chronology
"Can We Fix It?" (2000)	"Mambo No. 5" (2001)	"Big Fish Little Fish" (2008)

On 3 September 2001, BBC Worldwide released a novelty version of the song sung by British actor Neil Morrissey, who provided the voice of Bob for children's television show Bob the Builder. It features background vocals from Rob Rackstraw and Kate Harbour, who voiced several other characters on the show. This cover radically changed the lyrics to fit the theme of the show, making numerous references to construction, repairs and roadway maintenance, as well as the show's characters. The women's names from Bega's version are also replaced with types of construction supplies and building tasks, such as timber, a saw, waterproofing and tiling.

=== Chart performance ===
On 9 September 2001, the song debuted at number one on the UK singles chart, becoming Bob the Builder's second number-one single on the listing after "Can We Fix It?". In doing so, Bob became the first novelty act to top the UK chart with more than one single. Following the 11 September attacks, the song was removed from the BBC Radio 2 playlist due to its lyrics about building construction, with the station's executive music producer Colin Martin describing the song as being "too frivolous in light of the news that was breaking". The song earned a gold certification from the British Phonographic Industry (BPI) on 12 October 2001 for shipping over 400,000 units. At the end of 2001, it was ranked as the UK's 17th-best-selling single.

In Ireland, the song first appeared on the Irish Singles Chart at number 13 on 13 September and peaked at number four the following week. It remained in the top 50 for 10 weeks in total. At the end of the year, the song came in at number 42 on Ireland's year-end chart. "Mambo No. 5" debuted at number three on the Australian Singles Chart on 4 November 2001 and reached number two on 18 November. After staying at the position for another week, the song descended the chart, spending nine more weeks in the top 50. It was Australia's 26th-most-successful hit of the year and shipped over 70,000 copies, allowing it to receive a platinum certification from the Australian Recording Industry Association (ARIA).

=== Track listing ===
- CD and maxi-CD single
1. "Mambo No. 5"
2. "Super Spud" (Spud's dub)
3. "Mambo No. 5" (karaoke mix)
4. "Mambo No. 5" (video CD-ROM)

=== Charts ===
==== Weekly charts ====
Weekly chart performance for "Mambo No. 5"
Chart (2001)	Peak position
Australia (ARIA)	2
Ireland (IRMA)	4
Scottish Singles Sales (Official Charts)	1
UK Singles (Official Charts)	1
UK Indie (Official Charts)	1

==== Year-end charts ====
Year-end chart performance for "Mambo No. 5"
Chart (2001)	Position
Australia (ARIA)	26
Ireland (IRMA)	42
UK Singles (OCC)	17

=== Certifications ===
Certifications and sales for "Mambo No. 5"
Region	Certification	Certified units/sales
Australia (ARIA)	Platinum	70,000^{^}
United Kingdom (BPI)	Gold	400,000^{^}
^{^} Shipments figures based on certification alone.

=== Release history ===
Release dates and formats for "Mambo No. 5"
Region	Date	Format(s)	Label(s)	Ref.
United Kingdom	3 September 2001	CD; cassette	BBC	
Australia	22 October 2001	CD	Universal Music Australia	

== Ome Henk parody ==
In 1999, Dutch TV character Ome Henk (Frank van der Plas) took a parody of the song called "Mambo Nr 6" to number 17 on the Dutch Top 40. The lyrics referred to the medicine prescribed to him, which causes hallucinations of the girls he mentions in the song. A parody of commercials for the fictional product is also heard.

== Legacy ==
- The original recording by Pérez Prado was inducted into the Latin Grammy Hall of Fame in 2001.
- This song was initially selected as the theme song of the 2000 Democratic National Convention, but this plan was scrapped due to the possibility of people associating the song with Monica Lewinsky, who had a central role in the Clinton–Lewinsky scandal, with the chorus, "A little bit of Monica in my life".
- The Lou Bega version has become associated with the England cricket team and Test cricket after it was used by UK broadcaster Channel 4 as the theme for their live coverage of England Test matches between 1999 and 2005; the music also accompanied the return of cricket to the channel during the 2021 India–England series. Having been particularly famous during the 2005 Ashes series won by England, the song is still played today by the England cricket fans, the 'Barmy Army'.
- Mambo V (Michael Dobson), a character in Ninjago, is named after the song.
- The Florida Panthers, a National Hockey League team, play the song after they score their fifth goal in a game
- Prado's version is sampled in the title track of Karol G's Tropicoqueta.
- The song was used in The Boys episode "King of Hell" the playing in the van's radio, filling the awkward silence.
