= Bachata: A Social History of a Dominican Popular Music =

Bachata: A Social History of a Dominican Popular Music is a 1995 non-fiction book by Deborah Pacini Hernández, published by Temple University Press.

== Background ==
The author wanted to write a book about merengue music, but changed her focus to bachata while visiting the Dominican Republic for research purposes.

== Content ==
"Music and Dictatorship," the second chapter, described the genre under the rule of Rafael Trujillo. The dictator preferred merengue over bachata and pushed the former to be more prominent.

The conclusion gives a comparison between the subject to other popular music in other countries.

== Reception ==
Gage Averill of New York University concluded that overall the work is "remarkable and readable", although it is "uneven in places".

John Charles Chasteen of the University of North Carolina at Chapel Hill praised the book for being "lucid" and reflecting the author's knowledge of the subject.

Suzel Ana Reily of Queen's University, Belfast described the book as "an important contribution" about the subject.
