= Mambo Mambo =

Single by Lou Bega

from the album A Little Bit of Mambo
- Released: 5 June 2000
- Genre: Latin pop; mambo
- Length: 3:00 (original version); 3:17 (radio version)
- Label: Lautstark; BMG; RCA
- Songwriters: Lou Bega; Zippy Davids; Frank Lio; Donald Fact
- Producers: Goar B; Frank Lio; Donald Fact

Lou Bega singles chronology
| "Tricky, Tricky" (1999) | "Mambo Mambo" (2000) | "Gentleman" (2001) |

"Mambo Mambo" is Lou Bega's fourth single from his album A Little Bit of Mambo. It became a hit on the French singles chart where it peaked at number 11 and was certified Silver, and in the Walloon singles chart where it peaked at number 25.

== Track listing ==
CD single

1. "Mambo Mambo" (radio version) – 3:17
2. "Baby Keep Smiling" (album version) – 3:10

== Charts ==
Chart performance for "Mambo Mambo"
| Chart (2000) | Peak position |
|---|---|
| Belgium (Ultratip Bubbling Under Flanders) | 15 |
| Belgium (Ultratop 50 Wallonia) | 25 |
| France (SNEP) | 11 |
