= Paul K. Joyce =

- Born: Paul Kevin Joyce; July 1957 (age 69)
- Occupations: Composer, producer, orchestrator, arranger and conductor
- Instrument: Keyboards
- Years active: 1990–present

Paul Kevin Joyce (born July 1957) is a British composer, producer, orchestrator, arranger and conductor. He is known for his music for theatre and television, including the 2005 BBC TV film The Snow Queen and the 2008 British TV film Clay. He wrote "Can We Fix It?", the theme song to the children's television programme Bob the Builder that became the bestselling single of 2000 in the UK.

== Early life ==
He attended Hall Park Technical Grammar School in Eastwood, Nottinghamshire, where he was head boy in 1975. From Trent Polytechnic, he gained a BSc in Applied Biology.

== Career ==
Earlier in his career, Joyce was a member of synthpop trio Sense, produced by Soft Cell's Dave Ball. Following tours with Depeche Mode and Kim Wilde, they had a hit in France with their single, "Jamie". The band released their only album, Hold On, in 1983.

His first television work was the animation Coconuts (ITV 1990). He has since written music for numerous TV series and films including Noddy's Toyland Adventures (BBC TV 1992–99), The Worst Witch (ITV 1998–2000), The Snow Queen (BBC 2005), Philbert Frog (BBC 1993), Clay (BBC film 2008), Diggit (ITV 1998–2001), Knight School (CITV 1997–1998), Slim Pig (CITV 1996) and Fimbles (BBC 2002–2005). His theme song for Bob the Builder ("Can We Fix It?") became a hit single and sold more than a million copies in the UK, for which Joyce received an Ivor Novello Award on 24 May 2001. He would go on to score the Bob the Builder series for the first nine seasons.

Joyce also composes for theatre, notably for a staging of Quatermass and the Pit in a UK quarry in 1997. Joyce has staged his oratorio version of Hans Christian Andersen's The Snow Queen at London's Barbican Hall (2003), Cadogan Hall (2004), and the Hall for Cornwall (2011). A dramatized television production of The Snow Queen featuring Joyce's music was commissioned by the BBC; it premiered on BBC One on Christmas Day in 2005 and proved to be the most popular children's show of the year.

He collaborated with Steve Howe on Howe's solo album Time, released November 2011 on Warner Classics.

Joyce co-executive produced a feature film script based on Non-Stop, the science fiction novel by Brian Aldiss. He developed an adaptation of the life story of war correspondent, Clare Hollingworth, known for scooping the beginning of the Second World War in 1939. In 2019, Joyce premiered a new contemporary orchestral work, Celestial, of songs and music featuring the poems of the late Johnnie Douglas-Pennant. Celestial is narrated by actor Michael Sheen and features Steve Howe on guitar and soundscapes by Chris Watson.

In 2020, Howe asked Joyce to contribute orchestrations to a new Yes album, The Quest, where he worked with the FAMES orchestra. A 2021 commission from the British Medical Association to compose a work to honour all health care workers who died during the COVID-19 pandemic resulted in "We Will Remember, We Can't Forget", featuring the Royal Philharmonic Orchestra, Burntwood School Chamber Choir and soloists. Joyce was a guest speaker at the Soundsgate Composers' Summit in Prague in April 2022 and, in May, was recording with the FAMES orchestra in Skopje. Joyce and the FAMES orchestra again worked on Yes's next album, due 2023, Mirror to the Sky.
