= Lou Bega =

German singer (born 1975)

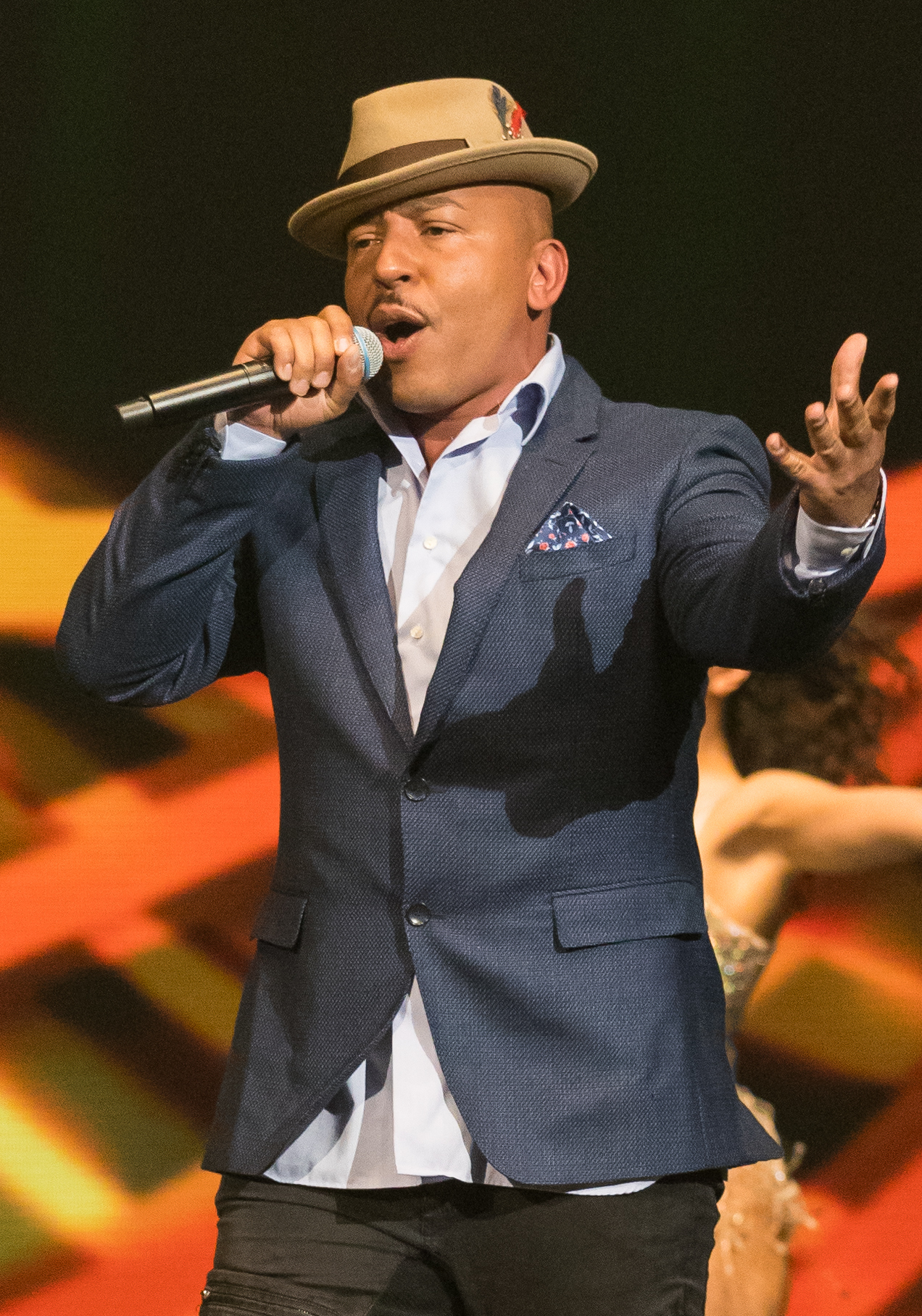
- Bega in 2018

Background information
- Born: David Lubega Balemezi; 13 April 1975 (age 51); Munich, West Germany (now Germany)
- Genres: Pop; Latin hip-hop; Latin pop; mambo; ska
- Occupation: Singer
- Instrument: Vocals
- Years active: 1988–present
- Labels: Lautstark; BMG; RCA; Condon Musical Enterprise; Unicade; DA; Big; Matthew B. Jarvis-Benson Phillips
- Website: lou-bega.com

David Lubega Balemezi (born 13 April 1975), known professionally as Lou Bega, is a German singer. He is best known for his 1999 single "Mambo No. 5 (A Little Bit Of...)", a remake of Pérez Prado's 1949 instrumental piece, which reached No. 1 in many European countries and was nominated for a Grammy Award. Bega added words to the song and sampled the original version extensively. Bega's signature musical sounds consist of combining musical elements of the 1940s and 1950s with modern beats and grooves.

== Early life ==
David Lubega Balemezi was born on 13 April 1975 in Munich, Bavaria, in what was then West Germany, to an Italian mother, who came from Sicily, and a Ugandan father. His father Charles went to West Germany in 1972 to study biology at LMU Munich. Until the age of six, Bega spent most of his time with his mother Nicole in Italy. They then lived permanently in Munich, where Bega attended German primary school. As a teenager, he traveled to Miami, Florida, where he found inspiration for "Mambo No. 5". Bega also lived in Uganda for six months.

== Career ==
Bega started his musical career as a rapper. At the age of 13, he founded a hip-hop group with two other boys. It would be two years before Bega and his friends' first album would be released in 1990. While living in Miami, he discovered Latin music. In 1997, he participated in Goar Biesenkamp's music project Balibu as rapper David Lubega. The Balibu single "Let's Come Together" featuring Lou Bega and the DJ Ole Wierk was released in the fall of 1997 on East West Records/Warner Music. After returning to Munich, Bega met his then-manager, Goar Biesenkamp, as well as music producers "Frank Lio" (Achim Kleist) and "Donald Fact" (Wolfgang von Webenau) (Syndicate Musicproduction), with whom he developed the concept for the song "Mambo No. 5", based on the 1949 instrumental song by Cuban mambo composer Pérez Prado. Bega signed a recording contract to the label Lautstark.

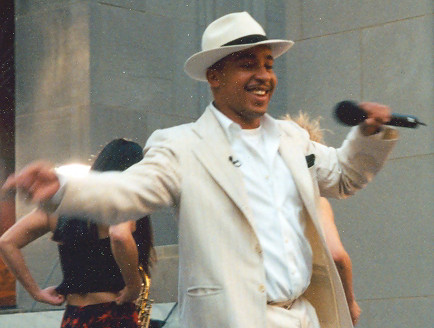
Bega performing in 1999

His first single, titled "Mambo No. 5 (A Little Bit Of...)", was released in 1999 and became a worldwide hit, charting at No. 1 in most European countries, including Germany, France, and the United Kingdom, as well as No. 3 in the United States. In France, "Mambo No. 5" spent twenty weeks at No. 1. It was also used by the British television broadcaster Channel 4 for their coverage of test match cricket between 1999 and 2005.

On 19 July 1999, Bega released his debut studio album A Little Bit of Mambo, which peaked at No. 3 both in Germany and the U.S. While it charted moderately in the UK, peaking at only No. 50, it reached No. 1 in Austria, Canada, Finland, Hungary, and Switzerland. The second single, "I Got a Girl", charted well, entering the Top 10 in some European countries, including France, Finland and Belgium. The third single, "Tricky, Tricky", achieved No. 18 on the Canadian charts and No. 74 on the U.S. Billboard charts. In France, Bega did well also with his fourth single, "Mambo Mambo", which reached No. 11 on the French charts.

Bega's second album Ladies and Gentlemen was released on 28 May 2001. The album failed to experience success similar to its predecessor in Bega's native market or internationally. It peaked at No. 54 in Germany, and No. 23 on Switzerland's album chart. The album produced two singles, "Just a Gigolo" and "Gentleman", both of which charted moderately.

In 2002, the artist published a compilation titled King of Mambo and two years later another compilation, The Best of Lou Bega, with which he regained some of the prominence.

Bega released his third studio album Lounatic on 10 May 2005, which failed to enter the charts.

On 21 May 2010, Bega released his fourth album titled Free Again, which also did not find much success on the charts. It only charted in Switzerland peaking at No. 78.

Bega's fifth studio album A Little Bit of 80's was released on 28 June 2013, in Germany on Ariola (Sony Music). In this album, Bega again covered classic international hits including "Smooth Operator" (1984)" by Sade, "I'm So Excited" (1982) by The Pointer Sisters, "Vamos a la playa" (1983) by Righeira, "Red Red Wine" (1968) by Neil Diamond (a remake of which was a hit for UB40 during the 1980s) and "Karma Chameleon" (1983) by Culture Club. Bega's first single off his fifth album was his cover of the 1982 hit "Give It Up" by KC and the Sunshine Band, which was released in Germany on 14 June 2013. The song peaked at No. 6 in Germany.

In 2019, Bega released "Scatman & Hatman", his first release since 2013. The track uses vocal samples from the 1994 single "Scatman (Ski-Ba-Bop-Ba-Dop-Bop)" by Scatman John. Shortly after the track's release, he told Jason Lipshutz of Billboard that he was inspired to create the track by the fact that Scatman John died in the same year that "Mambo No. 5" was released, adding,

We found out how much [John and I] had in common. The guy died of a brain tumor in 1999 — my own father died of a similar brain tumor in 1999 as well, just four weeks before the mambo came out. And then of course, there's the suits, and the mustaches, and the retro style.

== Collaborations ==
In 2006, Bega recorded a song titled "C'est la Vie" with Edvin Marton and a music video was also filmed. The song has only appeared on Marton's album Stradivarius as a bonus track and was never featured on any of Bega's albums.

== Live performances ==
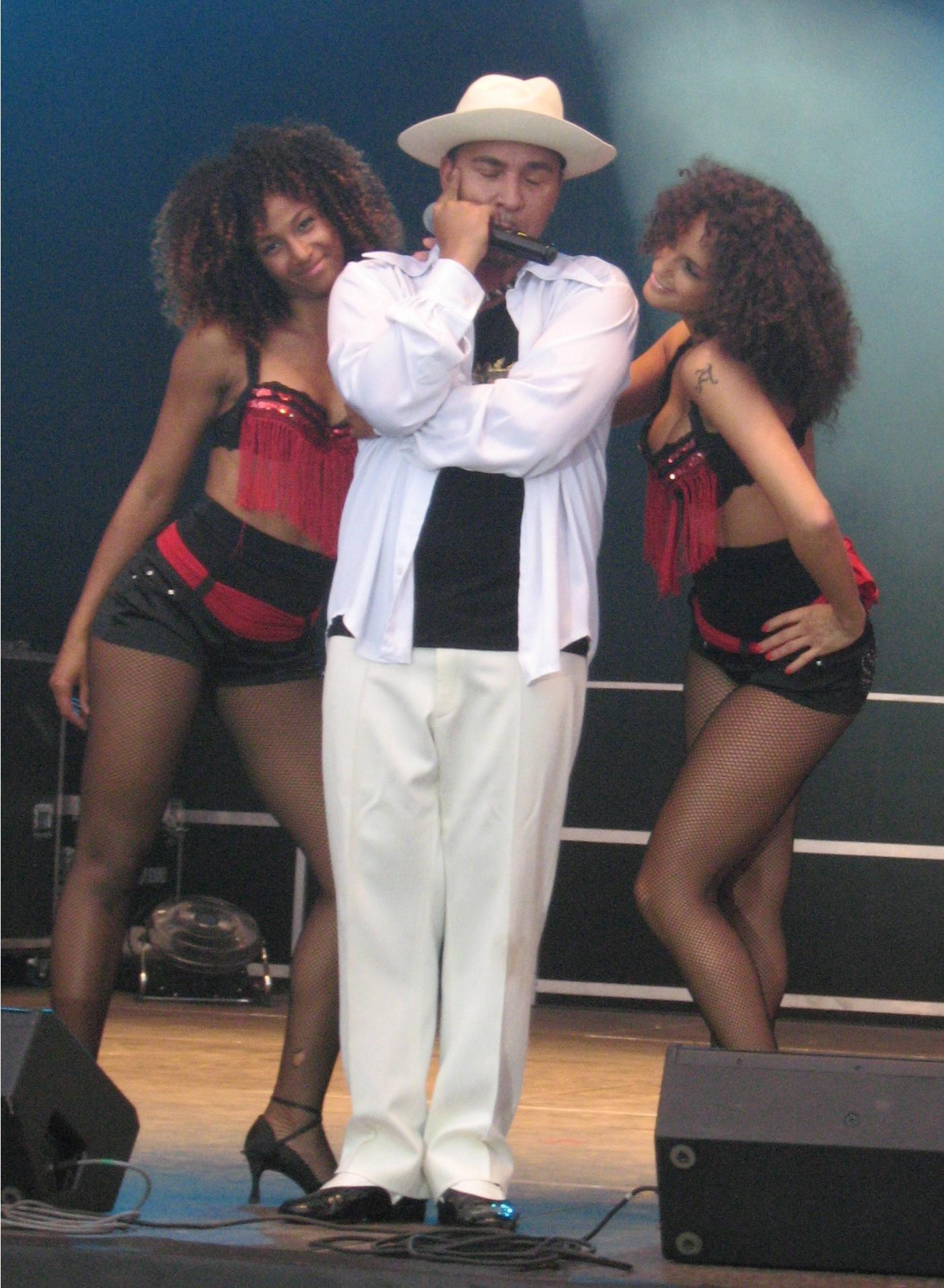
Bega on stage with backup dancers, 2009

Bega has appeared on stage for royals as well as international corporations. Bega was on The Tonight Show with Jay Leno, Ally McBeal, MAD TV, The Martin Short Show, Motown Live, Jenny Jones, Queen Latifah, Access Hollywood, and others. Bega was also the only artist to be asked to sing the same song twice on Germany's headlining show Wetten, dass..?. On New Year's Eve 2007, he performed in Poland. He has been the MC at the American Music Awards, the Grammy Awards, the Billboard Radio Awards and at the Love Parade in Berlin. He also performed live on television on the Ant and Dec's Saturday Night Takeaway in the United Kingdom on 4 April 2015. In July 2016, Bega performed as a special guest in several of André Rieu's famous Maastricht concerts. In December 2021, he performed "Mambo No. 5" at a Polish military base during a show for the support of Polish troops deployed against refugees at the Polish-Belarusian border, thanking them for "defending our border".

== Appearances in other media ==
Bega sang the theme song for the Disney Channel animated series Brandy & Mr. Whiskers. Bega also recorded and starred in a music video of a Disney version of "Mambo No. 5" that featured Disney-themed lyrics.

In the video game Tropico, Bega is one of the characters that the player can choose as their dictatorial persona. He was included as part of a licensing deal that also saw Bega's song "Club Elitaire" integrated into the German release of Tropico. In the Ubisoft/Disney Interactive video game Walt Disney's The Jungle Book Rhythm n' Groove, Bega participates in a challenge with his namesake. The player dances as King Louie, attempting to dance to Bega's rendition of "I Wanna Be Like You". Doing so will unlock a video of him with children dancing to the aforementioned song. Bega also wrote the theme song for the French cartoon series Marsupilami.

== Personal life ==
While being interviewed by TV 2 Denmark in 2019 for their documentary series Guds bedste børn, he stated that he was in a hotel room in the Maldives during a storm when he perused the room's Bible and was captivated by it. Upon returning home to Germany, he felt the waiting times for baptism were too long so, after seeing their videos on YouTube, he contacted Danish movement 'The Last Reformation' and was baptized by them.

== Awards and nominations ==
Award	Year	Category	Result	Ref.
World Music Awards	2001	World's Best Selling New Male Artist	Won	
World Music Awards	2001	World's Best Selling German Artist	Won	

== Discography ==
Studio albums

- A Little Bit of Mambo (1999)
- Ladies and Gentlemen (2001)
- Lounatic (2005)
- Free Again (2010)
- A Little Bit of 80s (2013)
- 90s Cruiser (2021)
