= Gabrielle discography =

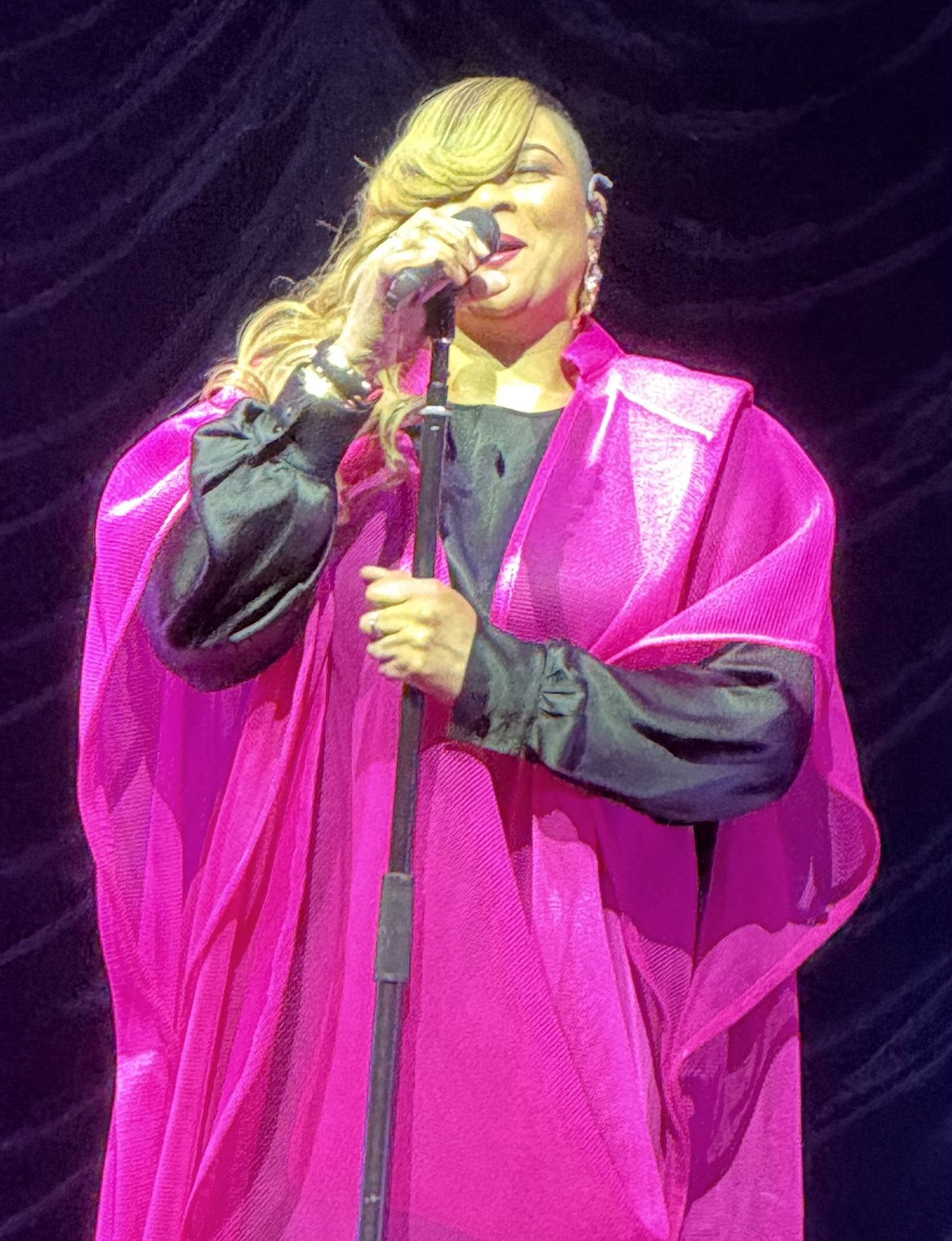
- Gabrielle in 2025.
- Studio albums: 8
- Compilation albums: 3
- Singles: 29
- Music videos: 24

The discography of Gabrielle, an English singer, consists of eight studio albums, three greatest-hits compilations, 30 singles and a number of other appearances.

Her debut single "Dreams" topped the UK Singles Chart in June 1993. Other notable singles include "Going Nowhere", "Give Me a Little More Time", "Walk On By" and "If You Ever" – a duet with East 17. After a few fallow years, Gabrielle made a comeback with "Rise", which in 2000 became her second British number-one single. The album of the same name also reached the top spot in the UK Albums Chart, where it stayed for three weeks. "Out of Reach" from the soundtrack to the film Bridget Jones's Diary reached number four on the UK Singles Chart. Gabrielle's greatest-hits collection Dreams Can Come True, Greatest Hits Vol. 1 was released in 2001.

== Albums ==
=== Studio albums ===
List of albums, with selected chart positions and certifications
Title	Album details	Peak chart positions								Certifications
Title	Album details	UK	AUS	AUT	GER	IRE	NLD	SWE	SWI	Certifications
Find Your Way	Released: 18 October 1993; Label: Polygram (#828 441-4); Formats: CD, cassette	9	95	—	72	—	87	56	—	BPI: Gold
Gabrielle	Released: 27 May 1996; Label: Polygram (#828 724-4); Formats: CD, cassette	11	138	—	—	—	80	—	—	BPI: Platinum
Rise	Released: 18 October 1999; Label: Go Beat (#547 768-2); Formats: CD, cassette	1	116	17	19	6	23	—	19	BPI: 4× Platinum
Play to Win	Released: 17 May 2004; Label: Universal (#986 653-1); Formats: CD, digital download	10	—	72	98	43	—	—	70	BPI: Gold
Always	Released: 1 October 2007; Label: Universal (#1720375); Formats: CD, digital download	11	—	—	—	79	—	—	—	
Under My Skin	Released: 17 August 2018; Label: BMG (#538393252); Formats: CD, vinyl, digital download, streaming	7	—	—	—	—	—	—	—	
Do It Again	Released: 5 March 2021; Label: BMG (#538670112); Formats: CD, digital download, streaming	4	—	—	—	—	—	—	—	
A Place in Your Heart	Released: 10 May 2024; Label: BMG; Formats: CD, LP, digital download, streaming	30	—	—	—	—	—	—	—	
"—" denotes releases that did not chart or were not released

=== Compilation albums ===
Title	Album details	Peak chart positions						Certifications
Title	Album details	UK	AUS	AUT	GER	IRE	NLD	Certifications
Dreams Can Come True, Greatest Hits Vol. 1	Released: 12 November 2001; Label: Polygram (#589 734-2); Formats: CD, Cassette, LP	2	97	59	46	3	15	BPI: 5× Platinum
Now and Always: 20 Years of Dreaming	Released: 25 November 2013; Label: Island (#3757245); Formats: CD, digital download	38	—	—	—	—	—	BPI: Gold
Dreams: The Best Of	Released: 6 May 2016; Label: Spectrum Music (#0075366711); Formats: CD, digital download	—	—	—	—	—	—	BPI: Silver
"—" denotes releases that did not chart or were not released

=== Remix albums ===
List of albums, with selected chart positions and certifications
Title	Album details	Peak chart positions
Title	Album details	UK
Rise Underground	Released: 2000; Label: Go Beat (#549 284-2); Formats: CD, cassette	175

== Singles ==
=== As lead artist ===
List of singles as lead artist, with selected chart positions and certifications, showing year released and album name
Title	Year	Peak chart positions										Certifications	Album
Title	Year	UK	AUS	AUT	GER	IRE	NL	NZ	SWE	SWI	US	Certifications	Album
"Dreams"	1993	1	2	10	14	2	7	36	5	10	26	BPI: Platinum; ARIA: Platinum; RMNZ: Gold	Find Your Way
"Going Nowhere"	1993	9	77	—	57	18	38	—	—	22	—		Find Your Way
"I Wish"	1993	26	—	—	—	—	—	—	—	—	52		Find Your Way
"Because of You"	1994	24	152	—	—	—	—	—	—	—	—		Find Your Way
"Give Me a Little More Time"	1996	5	70	—	—	9	36	40	35	—	—	BPI: Gold	Gabrielle
"Forget About the World"	1996	23	143	—	—	—	—	—	—	—	—		Gabrielle
"If You Really Cared"	1996	15	—	—	—	—	—	—	—	—	—		Gabrielle
"If You Ever" (duet with East 17)	1996	2	—	—	31	4	38	—	5	20	—	BPI: Platinum	Gabrielle
"Walk On By"	1997	7	—	—	—	—	96	—	—	—	—		Gabrielle
"Sunshine"	1999	9	—	—	—	—	98	—	—	—	—	BPI: Gold	Rise
"Rise"	2000	1	76	5	16	1	14	2	24	11	—	BPI: Platinum; RMNZ: Gold	Rise
"When a Woman"	2000	6	124	—	65	27	59	—	—	30	—	BPI: Silver	Rise
"Should I Stay"	2000	13	—	—	—	—	—	—	—	—	—		Rise
"Out of Reach"	2001	4	9	52	71	3	12	2	8	8	—	BPI: 2× Platinum; ARIA: Platinum; RMNZ: Platinum	Bridget Jones's Diary and Rise
"Don't Need the Sun to Shine (To Make Me Smile)"	2001	9	98	68	88	17	77	13	—	56	—		Dreams Can Come True: Greatest Hits Vol. 1
"Stay the Same"	2004	20	—	—	—	47	—	—	—	—	—		Play to Win
"Ten Years Time"	2004	43	—	—	—	—	—	—	—	—	—		Play to Win
"Why"	2007	42	—	—	—	—	—	—	—	—	—		Always
"Every Little Teardrop"	2007	—	—	—	—	—	—	—	—	—	—		Always
"Say Goodbye"	2013	—	—	—	—	—	—	—	—	—	—		Now and Always: 20 Years of Dreaming
"Show Me"	2018	—	—	—	—	—	—	—	—	—	—		Under My Skin
"Shine"	2018	—	—	—	—	—	—	—	—	—	—		Under My Skin
"Under My Skin"	2018	—	—	—	—	—	—	—	—	—	—		Under My Skin
"This Christmas"	2018	—	—	—	—	—	—	—	—	—	—		Non album single
"Every Step"	2019	—	—	—	—	—	—	—	—	—	—		Under My Skin
"Stop Right Now"	2021	—	—	—	—	—	—	—	—	—	—		Do It Again
"Can't Hurry Love"	2021	—	—	—	—	—	—	—	—	—	—		Do It Again
"A Place in Your Heart"	2024	— (Note: "A Place in Your Heart" did not enter the UK Singles Chart Top 100 but debuted and peaked at number 99 on the UK Singles Downloads Chart Top 100 on 16 February 2024.)	—	—	—	—	—	—	—	—	—		A Place in Your Heart
"Sorry"	2024	—	—	—	—	—	—	—	—	—	—		A Place in Your Heart

=== As featured artist ===
Title	Year	Peak chart positions		Album
Title	Year	UK	NZ	Album
"Perfect Day" (among various artists)	1997	1	—	—N/a
"Best Friend" (Mark Morrison with Gabrielle and Conner Reeves)	1999	23	50	Innocent Man
"As Far As The Eye Can See"	2003	—	—	The Chicken Shed Album
"Wake Up The Morning" (Gregg Kofi Brown featuring Gabrielle and Des'ree)	2005	—	—	Together as One
"Hollywood" (Naughty Boy featuring Gabrielle)	2013	—	—	Hotel Cabana
"All Together Now" (among The Peace Collective)	2014	70	—	—N/a
"With a Little Help from My Friends" (among NHS Voices)	2018	—	—	—N/a
"Sunshine" (DJ Spoony featuring Gabrielle)	2019	—	—	Garage Classical
"Sad Song" (JP Cooper featuring Gabrielle)	2025	36	—	'Just a Few Folk'
"—" denotes a title that did not chart, or was not released in that territory

== Music videos ==
Year	Song	Director(s)
1993	"Dreams"	Kate Garner
1993	"Going Nowhere"	
1993	"I Wish"	
1994	"Because of You"	
1996	"Give Me a Little More Time"	
1996	"Forget About the World"	Howard Greenhalgh
1996	"If You Really Cared"	
1997	"Walk on By"	John Maybury
1999	"Sunshine"	
2000	"Rise"	Kevin Godley
2000	"When a Woman"	Max & Dania
2000	"Should I Stay"	
2001	"Out of Reach"	Kevin Godley
2001	"Don't Need the Sun to Shine"	Max & Dania
2004	"Stay the Same"	Mike Lipscombe
2004	"Ten Years Time"	Urban Strom
2007	"Why"	
2007	"Every Little Teardrop"	Andy Hilton
2013	"Say Goodbye"	Monte De Costa
2018	"Show Me"	Dan Massie
2018	"Shine"	Dan Massie
2019	"Every Step"	
2021	"Stop Right Now"	Dynamic Cut Films
2021	"Can't Hurry Love"	David Lopez-Edwards; Dynamic Cut Films
