= Now and Always: 20 Years of Dreaming =

Compilation album by Gabrielle
- Released: 18 November 2013
- Recorded: 1993–2013
- Genre: Pop; R&B
- Length: 91:03
- Label: Island; Go Beat!
- Producer: The Boilerhouse Boys; Jonny Dollar; Jon Douglas; J. Dunne; Richie Fermie; Nicholas Foster; Julian Gallagher; J. Hirst; Jake Isaac; Paul Jervier; Steve Jervier; Sonny J. Mason; George McFarlane; Naughty Boy; Simon Richmond; Mike Rose; Jonathan Shorten; Richard Stannard; Syience; Jonathan Wales

Gabrielle chronology
Always (2007)	Now and Always: 20 Years of Dreaming (2013)	Under My Skin (2018)

Singles from Now and Always: 20 Years of Dreaming
- 1. "Say Goodbye" Released: 25 November 2013

Now and Always: 20 Years of Dreaming is a compilation album by English recording artist Gabrielle. It was released on 18 November 2013 through Island Records to coincide with the release of her debut single, "Dreams", twenty years ago. Conceived after a lengthy break, during which Gabrielle had considered retirement, she worked with several new collaborators on the new material on the album, including producers Jake Isaac, Sonny J. Mason, Naughty Boy, Syience as well as J. Hirst and J. Dunne and songwriter Emeli Sandé.

The album consists of 34 tracks, including most of Gabrielle's singles, a number of album tracks, remixes from her remix album Rise Underground, and seven brand new tracks. Naughty Boy's reworking of "Dreams" was made available on iTunes ahead of the album's release, with options to purchase it either as a standalone track or to receive it as an immediate download when pre-ordering the album, while "Say Goodbye" was released as a digital-only single on the same day as the album. The album debuted and peaked at number 38 on the UK Albums Chart.

== Critical reception ==
Professional ratings
Review scores
Source	Rating
Evening Standard	3/5 stars

Evening Standard editor Rick Pearson gave Now and Always: 20 Years of Dreaming a mixed-to-positive review, awarding it three out of five stars and framing it as a career-spanning retrospective released two decades after Gabrielle's debut. He noted that the set combines her best-known material with seven new tracks that introduce a slightly rockier edge, alongside remixes by contemporary producers. Pearson concluded that while the compilation contains standout moments such as "Give Me a Little More Time," it is uneven overall, with some weaker selections, and functions primarily as a solid but inconsistent collection aimed at longtime fans.

== Commercial performance ==
Now and Always: 20 Years of Dreaming debuted and peaked at number 38 on the UK Albums Chart and number 51 on the Scottish Albums Chart. In the United Kingdom, it reached Silver status on 10 May 2019 and was eventually certified Gold by the British Phonographic Industry (BPI) on 30 July 2021, indicating combined sales and streaming equivalent of 100,000 units in the United Kingdom.

== Track listing ==
Now and Always: 20 Years of Dreaming – CD 1
No.	Title	Writer(s)	Producer(s)	Length
1.	"Say Goodbye"	Gabrielle; Paddy Byrne	Syience	3:36
2.	"Rise"	Gabrielle; Ollie Dagois; Bob Dylan; Ferdy Unger-Hamilton	Jonny Dollar; Simon Richmond	3:40
3.	"When a Woman"	Gabrielle; Julian Gallagher; Richard Stannard	Gallagher; Stannard	3:12
4.	"Knew Me"	Gabrielle; Reginald Perry	Syience	3:39
5.	"Give Me a Little More Time"	Gabrielle; Ben Barson; Andy Dean; Ben Wolff	The Boilerhouse Boys	4:56
6.	"Dreams" (featuring Naughty Boy)	Gabrielle; Tim Laws	Richie Fermie; Naughty Boy	3:46
7.	"Heartbreaker"	Gabrielle; Ben Barson; Andy Dean; Ben Wolff	The Boilerhouse Boys	3:05
8.	"Show Me What You Got"	Gabrielle; Sonny J. Mason Osuji; Jaiden Roston	Sonny J. Mason	4:08
9.	"It Takes Time"	Gabrielle; Daniel J. Baker; Lisa Bennington; Johnny Dunne; Joe Hirst; Emeli Sandé	J. Hirst; J. Dunne	4:06
10.	"Walk On By"	Burt Bacharach; Hal David	The Boilerhouse Boys	3:20
11.	"Out of Reach"	Gabrielle; Shorten	Shorten	3:18
12.	"Now and Always"	Gabrielle; Jake Isaac	Isaac	4:35
13.	"Fallen Angels"	Gabrielle; Shorten	Shorten	3:36
14.	"Holding on for You"	Gabrielle; Perry	Syience	2:46
15.	"Sunshine"	Gabrielle; Jonathan Shorten	Shorten; Fermie^{[a]}	4:12
16.	"Dreams"	Gabrielle; Laws	Fermie	3:46
17.	"Closure"	Gabrielle; Gallagher	Gallagher	3:46

Now and Always: 20 Years of Dreaming – CD 2
No.	Title	Writer(s)	Producer(s)	Length
1.	"If You Ever" (with East 17)	Carl Martin	Mike Rose; Nicholas Foster	4:15
2.	"Falling"	Gabrielle; Gallagher; Stannard	Gallagher; Stannard	3:21
3.	"Going Nowhere"	Gabrielle; George McFarlane	Jonathan Wales; Paul Jervier; Steve Jervier	3:49
4.	"I Wish"	Gabrielle; Jon Douglas	Douglas	4:48
5.	"I Remember"	Gabrielle; Gallagher; Tom Brock; Robert Relf	Gallagher	3:03
6.	"Because of You"	Gabrielle; McFarlane; Raymond St. John	McFarlane	3:49
7.	"Don't Need the Sun to Shine (To Make Me Smile)"	Gabrielle; Shorten	Shorten	3:29
8.	"Should I Stay"	Gabrielle; Jonathan Sharp	Dollar; Richmond	3:56
9.	"All I Want"	Gabrielle; Gallagher	Gallagher	3:46
10.	"Why"	Gabrielle; Barson; Dean; Wolff	The Boilerhouse Boys	3:13
11.	"Ten Years Time"	Gabrielle; Shorten	Shorten	4:14
12.	"Forget About the World"	Gabrielle; Barson; Dean; Wolff	The Boilerhouse Boys	4:15
13.	"Every Little Teardrop"	Gabrielle; Gallagher	Gallagher	3:25
14.	"Show Me Love"	Gabrielle; Gallagher	Gallagher	3:15
15.	"Sunshine" (Wookie Main Mix)	Gabrielle; Shorten	Shorten; Fermie^{[a]}; Wookie^{[b]}	4:27
16.	"Rise" (Artful Dodger Above Board Vox Mix)	Gabrielle; Dagois; Dylan; Unger-Hamilton	Dollar; Richmond; Artful Dodger^{[b]}	3:46
17.	"Forget About the World" (Daft Punk Mix)	Gabrielle; Barson; Dean; Wolff	The Boilerhouse Boys; Daft Punk^{[b]}	6:47

Notes

- ^{^[a]} signifies co-producer
- ^{^[b]} signifies additional producer

== Charts ==
Weekly chart performance for Now and Always
Chart (2013)	Peak position
Scottish Albums (OCC)	51
UK Albums (OCC)	38
UK Album Downloads (OCC)	22

== Certifications ==
Certifications of Now and Always, with sales where available
Region	Certification	Certified units/sales
United Kingdom (BPI)	Gold	100,000^{‡}
^{‡} Sales+streaming figures based on certification alone.
