= Every Little Teardrop =

Every Little Teardrop may refer to:

- "Every Little Teardrop", single by Gallagher and Lyle B. Gallagher, G. Lyle 1977
- "Every Little Teardrop", Always (Gabrielle album)
