= Halo James =

British pop group

- Origin: London, England
- Years active: 1988–1991
- Label: Epic
- Past members: Christian James (vocals); Ray St. John (guitar); Neil Palmer (keyboards)

Halo James were a British pop group active from 1988 to 1991. They are best known for their hit single, "Could Have Told You So", which reached number 6 in the UK Singles Chart in 1990.

== Career ==
=== Formation ===
Halo James formed in London in 1988. The band was fronted by session vocalist Christian James (born 21 December 1962) and included Ray St. John as guitarist and songwriter, formerly of Latin soul band Pride, and Neil Palmer on the keyboard, formerly a member of the short-lived synth-rock act Atomage and dance duo Two People. The sound incorporated elements of soft rock, soul and synth-pop. The band was originally established as a side-project to St. John’s songwriting career after a chance meeting between St. John and James in the studio, after which James introduced Palmer to the project.

=== Chart success ===
The band was signed to Epic Records by Muff Winwood in August 1988 and were perhaps best known for their second single "Could Have Told You So". Released at Christmas in 1989, the single was a major success all over Europe, bringing the band to international audiences. "Could Have Told You So" reached No. 6 on the UK Singles Chart in early 1990 and the band performed the hit on Top of the Pops.

Their sole album Witness was acclaimed by music critics, reaching No. 18 on the UK Albums Chart and selling over 100,000 copies in its first year of release,. with four singles. Subsequently, "Could Have Told You So" regularly appeared on compilation albums throughout both the 1980s and 1990s.

=== Disbandment and aftermath ===
During work on their second album, Epic Records were taken over by Sony, and due to various structuring and personnel changes within the company Halo James could not fulfil their earlier success. The group disbanded in 1991, despite having songs already written for their second album.

James continued as a session vocalist for a couple of years. However, in the late 1990s he eventually abandoned his singing career to become a freelance writer. Originally intended for Halo James’s unreleased second album, James and St. John’s cowritten song "Mission of Love" became a UK Top 30 hit for Jason Donovan in 1992. St. John, who had previously co-written Sade's 1984 hit "Smooth Operator" prior to forming Halo James, still remains active as a songwriter, and has written hit songs for several other worldwide artists, including Snoop Dogg and Gabrielle. Palmer worked with Melanie between 1996 and 2001, and with Haddaway between 2002 and 2003; in 2004 he started a popular music shop in London called Rockbottom, but this closed in 2011. He is now the pianist for singer Xavier Naidoo.

== Discography ==
=== Singles ===
Year	Single	Peak chart positions				Album
Year	Single	UK	IRE	BEL (FLA)	GER	Album
1989	"Wanted"	45	—	—	—	Witness
1989	"Could Have Told You So"	6	3	50	48	Witness
1990	"Baby"	43	—	—	—	Witness
1990	"Magic Hour"	59	—	—	—	Witness
1990	"Wanted" (reissue)	89	—	—	—	Witness
"—" denotes single that did not chart or was not released.

=== Albums ===
- Witness – Epic 466761 – UK No. 18 – 1990
