= David Cracknell =

British journalist

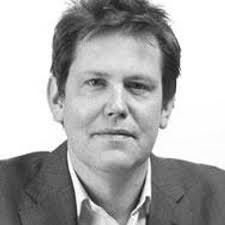
- Occupation: Journalist
- Known for: Former political editor of The Sunday Times

David Cracknell is a former journalist in the United Kingdom. Formerly political editor of The Sunday Times, he is head of a public relations firm, Big Tent Communications.

== Early life ==
Cracknell attended Forest School in London and Pembroke College, Oxford. While at Oxford, his short story Alternative Medicine was published by Margaret Drabble in the first series of The Mays.

== Journalism career ==
Prior to launching his own consultancy in 2008, he covered politics for newspapers for over 15 years, including stints at The Sunday Telegraph, Press Association and finally being political editor at The Sunday Times. He also helped found Sunday Business with Jeff Randall in 1998.

During his seven years as political editor of The Sunday Times, Cracknell contributed to "an extraordinary run of Whitehall scoops" which exposed Tony Blair's government.

On 23 May 2004, he revealed the doubts of Foreign Secretary Jack Straw that tactics in Iraq were "heavy handed".

Another big story came in April 2004 when he revealed a series of leaked cabinet papers on David Blunkett's plan to introduce compulsory ID cards.

On 8 August 2004, it was revealed that Sir David Omand, the UK's intelligence and security coordinator, had told a meeting of the British cabinet he was launching a major leak inquiry, which ended up costing an estimated £1 million.

Cracknell obtained a leaked document written by Alastair Campbell shortly before the 2005 general election which claimed that the Labour Party was "home and dry".

== Business career ==
Following his departure from The Sunday Times, he was a managing director at PR firm FD, formerly Financial Dynamics, as well as being chairman of its public affairs division, where he advised Northern Rock on its recovery plan following the bank being taken into public ownership.

He left in August 2008 to found his own communications firm, Big Tent Communications, of which he is managing director.

== Personal life ==
Cracknell lives in London and Rye, East Sussex and is married with three children.

In 2007 Cracknell played piano on a single by Gabrielle and Paul Weller called "Why".

== Notes ==
Media offices
Preceded by ?	Political Editor of The Sunday Times ?–2007	Succeeded by Jonathan Oliver
