= Ray St. John =

English songwriter (born 1953)

Raymond St. John (born 27 May 1953) is an English songwriter, record producer, and electric/acoustic guitarist. He is a former member of the Latin soul band Ariva, which developed into the funk band Pride, active from 1979 to 1982. Sade Adu was also a member of Pride in the early 1980s, and St. John is perhaps best known for co-writing her song "Smooth Operator".

After leaving Pride in 1983, St. John continued song-writing and then reformed the band again in 1984 with new songs and new members. It was here that he met vocalist Christian James, and session keyboard player Neil Palmer. The three went on to form the band Halo James, and were signed by Muff Winwood at Epic Records in 1988.

Their second single release "Could Have Told You So", reached No. 6 in the UK Singles Chart in February 1990 and became a major success all over Europe, bringing the band to international audiences. The band performed the hit on Top of the Pops and their sole album The Witness was acclaimed by music critics, and sold over 100,000 copies in its first year of release, peaking at No. 18 on the UK Albums Chart with 4 singles.

During work on their second album, Epic Records were taken over by Sony, and due to various structuring and personnel changes within the company Halo James could not fulfil their earlier success.

St. John remains active as a songwriter and producer, and has written hits for several other artists. St. John achieved international success with performers such as Snoop Dogg with "Perfect", Gabrielle with "Because of You", and Jason Donovan with "Mission of Love", and has cowritten with Dennis Morgan, Chris Braide, and Graham Stack.

St. John's songs have featured in films, commercials and TV shows.
