= Because of You (Gabrielle song) =

1994 single by Gabrielle

Single by Gabrielle

from the album Find Your Way
- Released: 14 February 1994
- Length: 3:49
- Label: Go! Beat
- Songwriters: Gabrielle; George McFarlane; Raymond St. John
- Producer: George McFarlane

Gabrielle singles chronology
"I Wish" (1993)	"Because of You" (1994)	"Give Me a Little More Time" (1996)

Music video
- "Because of You" on YouTube

"Because of You" is a song by English singer-songwriter Gabrielle. It was written by Gabrielle, George McFarlane, and Raymond St. John and produced by McFarlane for her debut studio album, Find Your Way (1993). Released as the album's fourth single on 14 February 1994, by Go! Beat, "Because of You" peaked at number 24 on the UK Singles Chart and number 25 in Iceland.

== Critical reception ==
Alan Jones from Music Week gave the song three out of five, writing that "Because of You" "is a gentle shuffle with widescreen orchestra and jangly acoustic guitar underpinning some excellent emoting from Gabrielle." He added, "Much in the mood of 'Dreams', though not so haunting, it is nonetheless a natural for the Top 20." James Hamilton from the Record Mirror Dance Update named it a "nagging typical ditty" in his weekly dance column.

== Music video ==
The accompanying music video for "Because of You" was directed by British photographer and artist Kate Garner and produced by Sarah Bayliss for Medialab. It was released on 14 February 1994 and features performance intercut with segments about relationships. Garner had previously directed the video for Gabrielles debut single, "Dreams".

== Track listings ==
UK CD1
No.	Title	Length
1.	"Because of You" (7-inch version)	3:49
2.	"Because of You" (Man. City mix)	5:49
3.	"Because of You" (Corporation Xpress)	6:05
4.	"Because of You" (Delta House of Funk vocal)	5:33
5.	"Because of You" (Delta Dubwize)	4:54
6.	"Because of You" (Wubble U mix)	6:59

UK CD2
No.	Title	Length
1.	"Because of You" (7-inch version)	3:49
2.	"Dreams" (live)	4:42
3.	"I Wish" (live)
4.	"Because of You" (live)	3:47

UK 12-inch single
No.	Title	Length
1.	"Because of You" (Man. City mix)	5:49
2.	"Because of You" (Corporation Xpress)	6:05
3.	"Because of You" (7-inch version)	3:49
4.	"Because of You" (Delta House of Funk vocal)	5:33
5.	"Because of You" (Delta Dubwize)	4:54

UK cassette single and European CD single
No.	Title	Length
1.	"Because of You"
2.	"Dreams" (live)

== Charts ==
Chart (1994)	Peak position
Australia (ARIA)	152
Europe (Eurochart Hot 100)	58
Europe (European Hit Radio)	34
Iceland (Íslenski Listinn Topp 40)	25
Scotland Singles (OCC)	18
UK Singles (OCC)	24
UK Airplay (Music Week)	14
UK Dance (Music Week)	6
UK Club Chart (Music Week)	10

== Release history ==
Region	Date	Format(s)	Label(s)	Ref.
United Kingdom	14 February 1994	12-inch vinyl; CD1; cassette	Go! Beat	
United Kingdom	21 February 1994	CD2	Go! Beat	
Australia	18 April 1994	CD; cassette	Go! Beat	
