= Stay the Same (Gabrielle song) =

2004 single by Gabrielle

Single by Gabrielle

from the album Play to Win
- B-side: "Letting Go"; "Play to Win"
- Released: 3 May 2004
- Length: 3:49
- Label: Go! Beat
- Songwriters: Gabrielle; Richard "Biff" Stannard; Julian Gallagher; Ferdy Unger-Hamilton; Dave Morgan
- Producers: Richard "Biff" Stannard; Julian Gallagher; Ferdy Unger-Hamilton

Gabrielle singles chronology
"Don't Need the Sun to Shine (To Make Me Smile)" (2001)	"Stay the Same" (2004)	"Ten Years Time" (2004)

"Stay the Same" is a song by British singer-songwriter Gabrielle. It was written by Gabrielle, Richard Stannard, Julian Gallagher, Ferdy Unger-Hamilton, and Dave Morgan, and produced by Stannard, Gallagher, and Unger-Hamilton for her fourth studio album Play to Win (2004). Selected as the album's lead single, it peaked at number 20 on the UK Singles Chart, number 47 on the Irish Singles Chart, and number 55 on the Romanian Top 100.

== Track listings ==
UK CD single
No.	Title	Writer(s)	Producer(s)	Length
1.	"Stay the Same"	Gabrielle; Julian Gallagher; Richard Stannard; Ferdy Unger-Hamilton; Dave Morgan	Gallagher; Stannard; Unger-Hamilton	3:49
2.	"Letting Go"	Gabrielle; Jonathan Shorten	Shorten	4:29

European maxi-CD single
No.	Title	Writer(s)	Producer(s)	Length
1.	"Stay the Same"	Gabrielle; Gallagher; Stannard; Unger-Hamilton; Morgan	Gallagher; Stannard; Unger-Hamilton	3:49
2.	"Letting Go"	Gabrielle; Shorten	Shorten	4:29
3.	"Play to Win"	Gabrielle; Gallagher; Stannard	Stannard	4:20

== Personnel ==
Personnel are taken from the UK CD single liner notes.

- Gabrielle – writing, vocals
- Richard "Biff" Stannard – writing, background vocals, production
- Julian Gallagher – writing, guitar, production
- Ferdy Unger-Hamilton – writing, production
- Dave Morgan – writing, guitar
- Sharon Murphy – background vocals
- Anthony Drennan – guitar
- Derrick Taylor – bass guitar
- Dylan Howe – drums
- Simon Hale – keyboards
- Mark "Spike" Stent – mixing
- Paul "Pdub" Walton – mixing
- David Treahearn – mixing
- Alvin Sweeney – recording, programming

== Charts ==
Chart (2004)	Peak position
Ireland (IRMA)	47
Romania (Romanian Top 100)	55
Scottish Singles Sales (Official Charts)	24
UK Singles (Official Charts)	20
