= I Wish (Gabrielle song) =

1993 single by Gabrielle

Single by Gabrielle

from the album Find Your Way
- B-side: "We Don't Talk"
- Released: 29 November 1993
- Genre: Soul
- Length: 4:49
- Label: Go! Beat
- Songwriters: Gabrielle; Jon Douglas
- Producer: Jon Douglas

Gabrielle singles chronology
"Going Nowhere" (1993)	"I Wish" (1993)	"Because of You" (1994)

Music video
- "I Wish" on YouTube

"I Wish" is a song by English singer-songwriter Gabrielle. It was written by Gabrielle and Jon Douglas for her debut album, Find Your Way (1993), while production was helmed by Douglas. Released as the album's third single on 29 November 1993 by Go! Beat, the song peaked at number 26 on the UK Singles Chart. In North America, "I Wish" reached numbers 26 and 52 on the US Cash Box Top 100 and Billboard Hot 100 charts and number 76 in Canada.

== Critical reception ==
Upon the release, Larry Flick from Billboard magazine wrote, "Top 40 follow-up to the breakthrough hit 'Dreams' shows Gabrielle in fine, feline voice, delivering sweetly romantic lyrics atop a plush shuffle beat. Coated with delicious strings and a light soul subtext, single has the strength to easily surpass its predecessor's chart peak and firmly establish Gabrielle as a radio star with a long and bright future." Alan Jones from Music Week gave it a score of four out of five, adding, "There's a surfeit of superior soul balladeering this week, and Gabrielle's is one of the best. it is likely to be huge." James Hamilton from the Record Mirror Dance Update described it as a "pleasant nasally crooned rolling swayer" in his weekly dance column. German band Culture Beat reviewed the song for Smash Hits, giving it three out of five.

== Music video ==
The accompanying music video for "I Wish" was directed by Max & Dania, a.k.a. Max Giwa and Dania Pasquini, and produced by Chris Symes for Propaganda Films. It was released on 29 November 1993 and is a funky version of Cinderella with The Posse members as the ugly sisters.

== Track listings ==
UK CD and 12-inch single
No.	Title	Length
1.	"I Wish" (7-inch mix)
2.	"I Wish" ('KC' R'n'B mix)
3.	"We Don't Talk" (Cleveland City house mix)
4.	"We Don't Talk" (Speechless mix)

UK 7-inch and cassette single; Japanese mini-CD single
No.	Title	Length
1.	"I Wish" (7-inch mix)
2.	"I Wish" ('KC' R'n'B mix)

European and Canadian CD single
No.	Title	Length
1.	"I Wish" (7-inch mix)	4:48
2.	"We Don't Talk" (Speechless mix)	4:33

US 12-inch single
No.	Title	Length
1.	"I Wish" (club mix)	5:05
2.	"I Wish" (radio mix)	3:55
3.	"I Wish" (instrumental)	4:44
4.	"I Wish" (club mix Brooklyn style)	5:26
5.	"I Wish" (radio mix Brooklyn style)	3:57

US cassette single
No.	Title	Length
1.	"I Wish" (radio mix)	3:55
2.	"I Wish" (radio mix Brooklyn style)	3:57
3.	"I Wish"	4:48
4.	"Dreams" (live)	4:40

== Charts ==
Chart (1993–1994)	Peak position
Canada Top Singles (RPM)	76
Europe (Eurochart Hot 100)	69
Europe (European AC Radio)	19
Europe (European Hit Radio)	23
Iceland (Íslenski Listinn Topp 40)	34
UK Singles (Official Charts)	26
UK Airplay (Music Week)	8
UK Dance (Music Week)	4
UK Club Chart (Music Week)	5
US Billboard Hot 100	52
US Hot R&B/Hip-Hop Songs (Billboard)	52
US Pop Airplay (Billboard)	30
US Rhythmic Airplay (Billboard)	25
US Cash Box Top 100	26

== Release history ==
Region	Date	Format(s)	Label(s)	Ref.
United Kingdom	29 November 1993	7-inch vinyl; 12-inch vinyl; CD; cassette	Go! Beat	
Japan	25 February 1994	Mini-CD	Go! Beat	
