= If You Really Cared =

Single by Gabrielle

from the album Gabrielle
- Released: 23 September 1996
- Length: 4:52
- Label: Go Beat; Universal
- Songwriters: Gabrielle; Benjamin Barson; Ben Wolff; Andrew Dean
- Producer: The Boilerhouse Boys

Gabrielle singles chronology
"Forget About the World" (1996)	"If You Really Cared" (1996)	"If You Ever" (1996)

Music video
- "If You Really Cared" on YouTube

"If You Really Cared" is the third single from English singer-songwriter Gabrielle's self-titled second album (1996). It was written by Gabrielle, Ben Barson of the Boilerhouse Boys, Ben Wolff and Andrew Dean. "If You Really Cared" was released in September 1996 by Go Beat and Universal, and returned Gabrielle to the top 20 of the UK Singles Chart, peaking at number 15.

== Critical reception ==
Caitlin Moran from Melody Maker praised the song as "an inner-London C&W smooch that builds and builds into a deliciously sparse crescendo." Another Melody Maker editor, Simon Price, named it one of the Singles of the Week, writing, "'If You Really Cared' is another gorgeous period piece (shades of Lorraine Ellison's "Stay with Me" this time). I've had it on Repeat eight times in a row and I'm not bored yet. I want her to marry me." A reviewer from Music Week gave it three out of five, adding, "Gabrielle shows her class with this timeless ballad which captures a vintage soulful sound, but remains distinctly modern."

== Track listings ==
UK CD:1 (GODCD 153)
No.	Title	Length
1.	"If You Really Cared" (radio edit)	3:52
2.	"Baby I've Changed" (Ole' Ruffneck sound)	4:53
3.	"Baby I've Changed" (Carl McIntosh)	5:48
4.	"Baby I've Changed" (D*Note remix)	5:48

UK CD:2 (GOLCD 153)
No.	Title	Length
1.	"If You Really Cared" (radio edit)	3:52
2.	"Give Me A Little More Time" (Def mix)	7:54
3.	"Give Me A Little More Time"	4:57
4.	"Dreams" (original and unreleased version)	6:21

UK cassette single (GODMCD 153)
No.	Title	Length
1.	"If You Really Cared" (radio edit)	3:52
2.	"Baby I've Changed" (Ole' Ruffneck sound)	4:53

== Charts ==
Chart (1996)	Peak position
Scotland Singles (OCC)	20
UK Singles (OCC)	15
UK Hip Hop/R&B (OCC)	3
