= Under My Skin (Gabrielle album) =

Studio album by Gabrielle
- Released: 17 August 2018
- Recorded: 2017–2018
- Genre: Pop; R&B
- Length: 44:49
- Label: BMG Rights
- Producer: Steve Chrisanthou; Ian Barter; Tim Larsson; Tobias Lundgren

Gabrielle chronology
Now and Always: 20 Years of Dreaming (2013)	Under My Skin (2018)	Do It Again (2021)

Singles from Under My Skin
- 1. "Show Me" Released: 26 April 2018; 2. "Shine" Released: 6 July 2018; 3. "Under My Skin" Released: 25 October 2018; 4. "Every Step" Released: 10 February 2019

Professional ratings
Review scores
Source	Rating
The Guardian	3/5 stars

Under My Skin is the sixth studio album by English singer and songwriter Gabrielle. It was released on 17 August 2018 via BMG Rights Management, her first studio record in 11 years since 2007's Always. Two singles have been released from the album; the lead single, "Show Me", was released on 26 April 2018. The second single "Shine", was released on 6 July 2018.

Gabrielle launched the new record with a sold-out show at London's Jazz Café on 8 May 2018.

== Reception ==
In a 3 out of 5 star review, Dave Simpson of The Guardian referred to the album as "a heartfelt comeback" that "makes it seem as if she never went away" and added that "the glossy pop-soul production is as catchy as her smashes" but that several songs "would be self-help manual material if they weren’t so passionately, sincerely sung". He concluded by explaining that "while more grit in the butter wouldn’t have gone amiss, Under My Skin returns to the sound that made Gabrielle famous".

== Track listing ==
Under My Skin – Standard Edition
No.	Title	Writer(s)	Producer(s)	Length
1.	"Under My Skin"	Gabrielle; Barter	Ian Barter	3:46
2.	"Thank You"	Gabrielle; Chrisanthou	Steve Chrisanthou	3:28
3.	"Show Me"	Gabrielle; Chrisanthou	Chrisanthou	3:29
4.	"Every Step"	Gabrielle; Barter	Barter	3:16
5.	"Stronger"	Gabrielle; Chrisanthou; Paul Siddall	Chrisanthou	4:23
6.	"Put Up a Fight"	Gabrielle; Barter	Barter	3:42
7.	"Signs"	Gabrielle; Barter	Barter	3:51
8.	"Breathe"	Gabrielle; Barter	Barter	3:57
9.	"Young and Crazy"	Gabrielle; Chrisanthou	Chrisanthou	3:18
10.	"Take a Minute"	Gabrielle; Chrisanthou	Chrisanthou	3:30
11.	"Won't Back Down"	Gabrielle; Sam Burgess	Barter	4:12
12.	"Shine"	Gabrielle; Tim Larsson; Tobias Lundgren	Larsson; Lundgren	3:57

Under My Skin – Deluxe Edition
No.	Title	Writer(s)	Producer(s)	Length
13.	"Like I Loved You"	Gabrielle; Larsson; Lundgren	Larsson; Lundgren	3:24
14.	"A Good Heart"	Gabrielle; Larsson; Lundgren	Larsson; Lundgren	3:51

== Personnel ==
Adapted from qobuz

- Gabrielle – vocals, backing vocals, composition
- Ian Barter – production, drums, guitar, bass guitar, keyboards, record engineering, composition
- Steve Chrisanthou – composition, production, guitar, bass guitar, mixing engineering, record engineering
- Tim Larsson – composition, production, piano, mix engineer, record engineering
- Tobias Lundgren – composition, production, guitar, mix engineering, record engineering
- Louise Hull – backing vocals
- Christian Burns – backing vocals
- Jennifer Kästel – backing vocals
- Jay Reynolds – mix engineering
- Guy Massey – mix engineering
- Dick Beetham – master engineering
- Chris Smith – drums
- Paul Siddall – keyboards
- Tim Kellet – brass
- Andy Thornton – bass guitar

== Charts ==
Chart (2018)	Peak position
Scottish Albums (OCC)	5
UK Albums (OCC)	7
UK Independent Albums (OCC)	1

== Release history ==
Region	Date	Format	Version	Label
Various	17 August 2018	digital download, audio streaming	Standard Edition	BMG Rights
UK	17 August 2018	CD, LP	Standard Edition	BMG Rights
Various	15 March 2019	digital download, audio streaming	Deluxe Edition	BMG Rights
