= Do It Again (Gabrielle album) =

Studio album by Gabrielle
- Released: 5 March 2021
- Recorded: 2020–2021
- Genre: Pop; R&B
- Length: 44:39
- Label: BMG
- Producer: Ian Barter

Gabrielle chronology
Under My Skin (2018)	Do It Again (2021)	A Place in Your Heart (2024)

Singles from Do It Again
- 1. "Stop Right Now" Released: 8 February 2021; 2. "Can't Hurry Love" Released: 26 March 2021

Professional ratings
Review scores
Source	Rating
Retro Pop	4/5 stars

Do It Again is the seventh studio album by English singer and songwriter Gabrielle. It was released on 5 March 2021 via BMG Rights Management and follows her 2018 collection Under My Skin. Primarily a covers album, Do It Again contains two new original songs and was officially announced on 7 February 2021. It was preceded by the release of lead single "Stop Right Now", which received its radio debut on 8 February during The Radio 2 Breakfast Show hosted by Zoe Ball.

== Background ==
Gabrielle appeared as a contestant on the second series of the reality competition The Masked Singer in early 2021. Under the guise of Harlequin, she performed cover songs each week and was finally "unmasked" during the semi-finals, finishing in fourth place. Shortly after her elimination, Gabrielle released the single "Stop Right Now" and announced that she was intending to release a new album featuring studio recorded versions of five of the six covers that she performed on the show, alongside other selected tracks and the original songs "Stop Right Now" and "Can't Hurry Love".

Of the album, Gabrielle stated: "I have loved putting my own stamp on the songs I sang on The Masked Singer along with some of my favourite covers and two new songs I wrote. The new single 'Stop Right Now' was written with Ben Cullum. It's a song I've wanted to release for a while and I would dance to it in my kitchen. I always felt it needed to see the light of day! I am so happy that day has come. I’m really excited for people to hear this album and I hope they enjoy my take on the covers and the new songs too."

Gabrielle intends to support the album on her Rise Again Tour in November 2021, which celebrates the 20th anniversary of her 1999 album Rise. The tour was originally planned to take place in 2020 but was delayed due to the COVID-19 pandemic.

== Critical reception ==
Awarding Do It Again four stars, Retro Pop called Gabrielle "one of Britain's most iconic voices" and noted that, "Classics like Smile, Teardrops and I’ll Be There sit alongside recent hits from Harry Styles, Billie Eilish and Rihanna for a collection that’s undeniably timeless."

== Track listing ==
No.	Title	Writer(s)	Original artist	Length
1.	"Killing Me Softly with His Song"	Charles Fox; Norman Gimbel; Lori Lieberman	Roberta Flack	4:24
2.	"Everything I Wanted"	Billie O'Connell; Finneas O'Connell	Billie Eilish	3:43
3.	"Falling"	Thomas Hull; Harry Styles	Harry Styles	4:14
4.	"Stop Right Now"	Louise Gabrielle Bobb; Ben Cullum		3:25
5.	"Teardrops"	Cecil Womack; Linda Womack	Womack & Womack	3:41
6.	"Proud Mary"	John Fogerty	Creedence Clearwater Revival	2:58
7.	"Bring It On Home to Me"	Sam Cooke	Sam Cooke	2:42
8.	"Can't Hurry Love"	Bobb; Ian Barter		3:47
9.	"Smile"	Charlie Chaplin	Nat King Cole	3:16
10.	"Diamonds"	Mikkel Eriksen; Sia Furler; Tor Hermansen; Benjamin Levin	Rihanna	3:51
11.	"I'll Be There"	Berry Gordy, Jr.; Bob West; Hal Davis; Willie Hutch	The Jackson 5	3:37
12.	"Fast Car"	Tracy Chapman	Tracy Chapman	5:01
Total length:				44:39

== Charts ==
Chart (2021)	Peak position
Scottish Albums (OCC)	6
UK Albums (OCC)	4
UK Independent Albums (OCC)	1
UK R&B Albums (OCC)	1

== See also ==
- List of UK Independent Albums Chart number ones of 2021
- List of UK R&B Albums Chart number ones of 2021
- List of UK top-ten albums in 2021
