= Ten Years Time =

2004 single by Gabrielle

Single by Gabrielle

from the album Play to Win
- B-side: "Baby, I Believe"
- Released: 2 August 2004
- Length: 3:44
- Label: Go! Beat
- Songwriters: Gabrielle; Jonathan Shorten
- Producer: Jonathan Shorten

Gabrielle singles chronology
"Stay the Same" (2004)	"Ten Years Time" (2004)	"You Used to Love Me" (2004)

"Ten Years Time" is a song by English singer Gabrielle. It was written by Gabrielle and Jonathan Shorten for her fourth studio album Play to Win (2004), while production was handled by Shorten. The second and final commercial single from album, it became Gabrielle's first single to miss the top forty of the UK Singles Chart, peaking at number 43, only spending a week inside the top 75. Irish singer-songwriter, Robert O'Connor, released a cover version of "Ten Years Time" as part of a double A-side single with the original composition "Spend the Night" in November 2006 in the UK and Ireland.

== Track listings ==
CD: 1 (UK)

No.	Title	Length
1.	"Ten Years Time" (7" Version)	3:44
2.	"Baby, I Believe"	3:56

CD: 2 (Germany)

No.	Title	Length
1.	"Ten Years Time" (7" Version)	3:44
2.	"Baby, I Believe"	3:56
3.	"Ten Years Time" (MaUVe Classic Vocal Mix)	7:48
4.	"Ten Years Time" (Video)	3:52

Promo CD (EU)

No.	Title	Length
1.	"Ten Years Time" (7" Version)	3:44
2.	"Ten Years Time" (MaUVe Radio Edit)	3:41
3.	"Ten Years Time" (MaUVe Classic Vocal Mix)	7:48
4.	"Ten Years Time" (MaUVe Classic Vocal Instrumental)	7:48

== Charts ==
Chart (2004)	Peak position
UK Singles (Official Charts)	43
