= Give Me a Little More Time =

1996 single by Gabrielle

Single by Gabrielle

from the album Gabrielle
- Released: 12 February 1996
- Genre: Pop; soul
- Length: 4:53
- Label: Go! Beat
- Songwriters: Gabrielle; Benjamin Barson; Ben Wolff; Andrew Dean
- Producer: The Boilerhouse Boys

Gabrielle singles chronology
"Because of You" (1994)	"Give Me a Little More Time" (1996)	"Forget About the World" (1996)

Music video
- "Give Me a Little More Time" on YouTube

"Give Me a Little More Time" is a song by English singer and songwriter Gabrielle, recorded for her self-titled second studio album (1996). Written by Gabrielle and Ben Barson with the Boilerhouse Boys, Ben Wolff, and Andrew Dean, it served as the album's lead single, released on 12 February 1996 by Go! Beat. "Give Me a Little More Time" returned Gabrielle to the top 10 of the UK Singles Chart, peaking at number five and spending 10 weeks inside the top 20. The song also peaked at number nine on the Irish Singles Chart and reached the top 40 in Iceland, Israel, the Netherlands, New Zealand, and Sweden. It was accompanied by a black-and-white music video. Melody Maker ranked "Give Me a Little More Time" number 18 on their list of the best singles of 1996.

== Critical reception ==
Larry Flick from Billboard magazine wrote, "Miles above 'Dreams' in song quality, this Go! Beat single shows Gabrielle in more flexible voice. The woman has clearly been working overtime on expanding her range and developing a unique approach to phrasing—and it shows. She's still got the street in her, to be sure, but this jam could easily broaden her reach beyond kids in the clubs and on the corner. The album mix surrounds her in Motown-styled echo, horns, and handclaps, with playful results." Caitlin Moran from Melody Maker named it "the direct sequel to 'What Becomes of the Broken Hearted'" and "a shiny pop miracle". In December 1996, Melody Maker ranked the song number eighteen in their list of "Singles of the Year", praising Gabrielle's "lovelorn 'been there' voice. A one-eyed Freda Payne for the New Labour era."

Alan Jones from Music Week commented, "Gabrielle has been away for some time and may have lost a little impetus but she certainly hasn't lost her talent, as her new single 'Give Me a Little More Time' amply demonstrates. She sings like an angel against a slowed-down Sixties Stax-style backing, with punchy brass and silky strings underpinning her charismatic vocals." Daisy & Havoc from the Record Mirror Dance Update gave the song a full score of five out of five, adding, "Gabrielle is back singing soul again, and old soul at that. She does it beautifully on the Album mix, which hums with some very old school atmosphere."

== Track listings ==
UK, Australian, and Japanese CD single
No.	Title	Length
1.	"Give Me a Little More Time" (edit)
2.	"Give Me a Little More Time" (Buckwild remix featuring OC)
3.	"Give Me a Little More Time" (Talvin Singh mix)
4.	"So Glad" (Delta 70 classic)

UK 12-inch single
No.	Title	Length
1.	"Give Me a Little More Time" (album version)
2.	"Give Me a Little More Time" (Buckwild remix)
3.	"Give Me a Little More Time" (Talvin Singh mix)
4.	"So Glad" (Delta 70 classic)

UK cassette single and European CD single
No.	Title	Length
1.	"Give Me a Little More Time" (edit)
2.	"So Glad" (Delta 70 classic)

US maxi-CD single
No.	Title	Length
1.	"Give Me a Little More Time" (LP version)	4:53
2.	"Give Me a Little More Time" (Morales club mix)	7:50
3.	"Give Me a Little More Time" (Morales dub mix)	9:51
4.	"Give Me a Little More Time" (Talvin Singh mix)	7:07
5.	"Forget About the World" (Daft Punk mix)	6:47
6.	"Dreams" (The Developed Arrested mix)	6:25

== Charts ==
=== Weekly charts ===
Chart (1996)	Peak position
Australia (ARIA)	70
Europe (Eurochart Hot 100)	24
Europe (European Dance Radio)	4
Iceland (Íslenski Listinn Topp 40)	21
Ireland (IRMA)	9
Israel (Israeli Singles Chart)	5
Netherlands (Single Top 100)	36
New Zealand (Recorded Music NZ)	40
Scottish Singles Sales (Official Charts)	4
Sweden (Sverigetopplistan)	35
UK Singles (Official Charts)	5
UK Dance (Official Charts)	34
UK Hip Hop/R&B (Official Charts)	2
UK Pop Tip Club Chart (Music Week)	18
US Bubbling Under Hot 100 (Billboard)	12
US Bubbling Under Hot R&B Singles (Billboard)	14
US Dance Club Songs (Billboard)	16
US Dance Singles Sales (Billboard)	27

=== Year-end charts ===
Chart (1996)	Position
UK Singles (OCC)	28
UK Airplay (Music Week)	2

== Certifications and sales ==
Region	Certification	Certified units/sales
United Kingdom (BPI)	Gold	422,000

== Release history ==
Region	Date	Format(s)	Label(s)	Ref.
United Kingdom	12 February 1996	12-inch vinyl; CD; cassette	Go! Beat	
Japan	17 May 1996	CD	Go! Beat	
United States	13 August 1996	Contemporary hit radio	Go! Discs; London	
