= Forget About the World =

Single by Gabrielle

from the album Gabrielle
- Released: 10 April 1996
- Length: 4:19
- Label: Go Beat; Universal
- Songwriters: Gabrielle; Ben Barson; Andy Dean; Ben Wolff
- Producer: The Boilerhouse Boys

Gabrielle singles chronology
"Give Me a Little More Time" (1996)	"Forget About the World" (1996)	"If You Really Cared" (1996)

Music video
- "Forget About the World" on YouTube

"Forget About the World" is a song by English singer-songwriter Gabrielle. It was written by Gabrielle along with Ben Barson, Andy Dean, and Ben Wolff for her self-titled second album (1996). "Forget About the World" did not perform as well as its predecessor "Give Me a Little More Time", peaking at number 23 on the UK Singles Chart. It was the lowest-charting single from Gabrielle.

The release included a remix by French electronic music duo Daft Punk. On their Alive 2006/2007 concert tour they created a mashup with "Aerodynamic", which was later released on the Alive 2007 live album.

== Critical reception ==
Caitlin Moran from Melody Maker wrote, "Firstly, 23? Twenty-three? That's where 'Forget About the World' charted at. Where's the justice in that? Gabrielle releases one of the sweetest, slinkiest summer ballads, with just the right about of melancholy and unease ribboning through it, and the bastard peaks at twenty three. I had a tenner on it going to Number One, and everything."

== Track listings ==
UK CD: 1 (GODCD 146)
No.	Title	Length
1.	"Forget About the World"	4:19
2.	"Forget About the World" (The Rollo & Sister Bliss mix)	4:55
3.	"Forget About the World" (Booker T. R&B mix)	5:42
4.	"Forget About the World" (Daft Punk 'Don't Forget The World' mix)	6:47
5.	"Forget About the World" (Matty's mix)	5:43

UK CD: 2 - Four Track EP (GOLCD 146)
No.	Title	Length
1.	"Forget About the World"	4:23
2.	"If You Really Cared" (acoustic)	4:12
3.	"People May Come" (acoustic)	4:45
4.	"Give Me a Little More Time" (acoustic)	4:22

UK cassette single (GODMCD 146)
No.	Title	Length
1.	"Forget About the World"	4:19
2.	"Forget About the World" (The Rollo & Sister Bliss mix)	4:55

== Charts ==
Chart (1996)	Peak position
Australia (ARIA)	143
Europe (Eurochart Hot 100)	89
Europe (European Dance Radio)	12
Israel (Israeli Singles Chart)	13
Scottish Singles Sales (Official Charts)	29
UK Singles (Official Charts)	23
