= Play to Win (Gabrielle album) =

Studio album by Gabrielle
- Released: 25 May 2004
- Length: 46:00
- Label: Go Beat; Universal
- Producer: Jonathan Shorten; Ferdy Unger-Hamilton; Julian Gallagher; Richard Stannard

Gabrielle chronology
Dreams Can Come True, Greatest Hits Vol. 1 (2001)	Play to Win (2004)	Always (2007)

Singles from Play to Win
- 1. "Stay the Same" Released: 3 May 2004; 2. "Ten Years Time" Released: 2 August 2004

Play to Win is the fourth studio album by the British singer Gabrielle. It was released by Go! Beat Records and Universal Music on 25 May 2004 in the United Kingdom. Gabrielle once again teamed with frequent collaborators Jonathan Shorten and trio Julian Gallagher, Richard Stannard, and Ferdy Unger-Hamilton to work on material for the record. Marking a departure from her usual R&B and pop style, the album incorporates elements of American Southern soul and country music. The track "Sometimes" was also featured on the soundtrack to the 2003 film Love Actually.

Critics gave Play to Win generally mixed but appreciative reviews, describing it as a subtle and more introspective reinvention of Gabrielle's sound, praising its warmth and consistency, while noting a lack of strong hooks and some repetition compared to her earlier work. Commercially, the album debuted at number 10 on the UK Albums Chart and reached the top 50 in several European territories, but it failed to match the success of her previous album Rise (1999). Play to Win produced two singles, including lead single and the top 20 hit "tay the Same."

== Critical reception ==
Professional ratings
Review scores
Source	Rating
AllMusic	3.5/5 stars

Jon O'Brien wrote that Play to Win marked a "subtle reinvention" for Gabrielle, praising its blend of country, Southern soul, indie, pop, and acoustic R&B influences and calling it her "most introspective, personal, and mature effort to date." He criticized the album's later tracks as becoming "a tad monotonous" and said it lacked the "immediacy and infectious hooks" of her previous releases. Hot Press editor Tanya Sweeney described Play to Win as a warm, understated album whose "simple, stripped-down style" complemented Gabrielle's consistent and emotive approach, praising tracks such as "Stay the Same", "No Big Deal", and "Sometimes." She wrote that although the album "seems devoid of surprises" at first, it gradually reveals its strengths, concluding that Gabrielle's "familiarity and consistency are powerful tools of choice."

== Commercial performance ==
Play to Win debuted at number 10 on the UK Albums Chart, becoming Gabrielle's fourth consecutive top-ten studio album in the United Kingdom. However, it failed to match the commercial success of her previous studio album, Rise (1999), which had topped the UK Albums Chart and achieved multi-platinum certification. Play to Win also reached number 14 on the Scottish Albums Chart and entered the top 50 in Ireland, peaking at number 43. Elsewhere in Europe, it charted at number 72 in Austria, number 70 in Switzerland, and number 98 in Germany. In the United Kingdom, Play to Win was certified Gold by the British Phonographic Industry (BPI) for shipments of over 100,000 copies.

== Track listing ==
Play to Win – International standard edition
No.	Title	Writer(s)	Producer (s)	Length
1.	"Ten Years Time"	Gabrielle; Jonathan Shorten	Shorten	4:14
2.	"Sometimes"	Gabrielle; Shorten	Shorten	3:54
3.	"Stay the Same"	Gabrielle; Julian Gallagher; Richard Stannard; Ferdy Unger-Hamilton; Dave Morgan	Gallagher; Stannard; Unger-Hamilton	3:49
4.	"You Used to Love Me"	Gabrielle; Gallagher; Stannard; Unger-Hamilton; Morgan	Gallagher; Stannard; Unger-Hamilton	4:11
5.	"No Big Deal"	Gabrielle; Gallagher; Stannard; Unger-Hamilton	Gallagher; Stannard; Unger-Hamilton	4:35
6.	"Latchkey Kid"	Gabrielle; Shorten	Shorten	4:24
7.	"Fallen Angels"	Gabrielle; Shorten	Shorten	3:36
8.	"Give and Take"	Gabrielle; Gallagher; Stannard; Unger-Hamilton; Morgan	Gallagher; Stannard; Unger-Hamilton	3:52
9.	"War of Two Minds"	Gabrielle; Shorten	Shorten	4:14
10.	"Picking Up the Pieces"	Gabrielle; Shorten	Shorten	4:51
11.	"Tumbling Down"	Gabrielle; Gallagher; Stannard; Unger-Hamilton	Gallagher; Stannard; Unger-Hamilton	4:33

Play to Win – UK special edition
No.	Title	Writer(s)	Producer (s)	Length
5.	"Play to Win"	Gabrielle; Gallagher; Stannard	Gallagher; Stannard; Unger-Hamilton	4:20
6.	"No Big Deal"	Gabrielle; Gallagher; Stannard; Unger-Hamilton	Gallagher; Stannard; Unger-Hamilton	4:35
7.	"Latchkey Kid"	Gabrielle; Shorten	Shorten	4:24
8.	"Fallen Angel"	Gabrielle; Shorten	Shorten	3:36
9.	"Give and Take"	Gabrielle; Gallagher; Stannard; Unger-Hamilton; Morgan	Gallagher; Stannard; Unger-Hamilton	3:52
10.	"War of Two Minds"	Gabrielle; Shorten	Shorten	4:14
11.	"Picking Up the Pieces"	Gabrielle; Shorten	Shorten	4:51
12.	"Tumbling Down"	Gabrielle; Gallagher; Stannard; Unger-Hamilton	Gallagher; Stannard; Unger-Hamilton	4:33
13.	"Letting Go" (Hidden track)	Gabrielle; Shorten	Shorten	4:29

== Charts ==
Chart performance for Play to Win
Chart (2004)	Peak position
Austrian Albums (Ö3 Austria)	72
German Albums (Offizielle Top 100)	98
Irish Albums (IRMA)	43
Scottish Albums (Official Charts)	14
Swiss Albums (Schweizer Hitparade)	70
UK Albums (Official Charts)	10

== Certifications ==
Certifications of Play to Win, with sales where available
Region	Certification	Certified units/sales
United Kingdom (BPI)	Gold	100,000^{^}
^{^} Shipments figures based on certification alone.
