= A Place in Your Heart =

Studio album by Gabrielle
- Released: 10 May 2024
- Genre: Pop; R&B
- Length: 43:21
- Label: Tag8 Music; BMG
- Producer: Ian Barter

Gabrielle chronology
Do It Again (2021)	A Place in Your Heart (2024)

Singles from A Place in Your Heart
- 1. "A Place in Your Heart" Released: 18 January 2024; 2. "Sorry" Released: 28 March 2024

A Place in Your Heart is the eighth studio album by English singer and songwriter Gabrielle. It was released on 10 May 2024 via BMG Rights Management and follows her 2021 covers collection Do It Again. It was preceded by the release of two singles, "A Place in Your Heart" and "Sorry".

== Critical reception ==
Professional ratings
Review scores
Source	Rating
The Independent	7/10
Retropop	4/5 stars

Retropop awarded 4 stars to the album and commended the "broad range of influences" on it while noting that it 'steps outside of all preconceived notions of a 'Gabrielle album' and offers up a body of work that feels current and relevant to the singer as she stands today". Naomi Clark of The Independent rated the album 7 out of 10 and called it "a varied offering full of soulful tracks". However, she felt that the album "narrowly falls short of the magic of her 90s classics" and was specifically critical of the song "Sorry", calling it "distinctly unoriginal" and "a middling pop ballad at best".

== Track listing ==
All tracks are written by Gabrielle and Ian Barter, and produced by the latter.

A Place in Your Heart track listing
No.	Title	Length
1.	"Sorry"	3:26
2.	"Miss You"	4:22
3.	"Won't Be There"	3:46
4.	"Good Enough" (featuring Mahalia)	3:41
5.	"Never"	3:38
6.	"Change"	3:34
7.	"A Place in Your Heart"	3:28
8.	"Rainbow"	3:15
9.	"Taken Over"	3:22
10.	"Lifeline"	3:25
11.	"Feel"	3:10
12.	"Conquer"	4:14
Total length:		43:21

== Personnel ==
- Gabrielle – songwriter, lead vocals, backing vocals
- Ian Barter – mastering engineer, mixing engineer, producer, drum programmer, electric guitar, keyboards, recording engineer, bass
- Alex Chalk and Marvin Francis – hair and makeup
- Jahméne – Photography & photo editing.
- Stefan Evans and Lewis Shaw – artwork text

== Charts ==
Chart performance for A Place in Your Heart
Chart (2024)	Peak position
Scottish Albums (OCC)	8
UK Albums (OCC)	30
UK Independent Albums (OCC)	1
