= Gabrielle (album) =

Studio album by Gabrielle
- Released: 27 May 1996
- Studio: Metropolis Studios, Chiswick, London; FM Studios; State 51, London
- Length: 60:09
- Label: Go! Beat; PolyGram
- Producer: The Boilerhouse Boys; Ashley Beedle; Nicholas Foster; Foster & McElroy; Mike Rose; Marc Woolford

Gabrielle chronology
Find Your Way (1993)	Gabrielle (1996)	Rise (1999)

Singles from Gabrielle
- 1. "Give Me a Little More Time" Released: 12 February 1996; 2. "Forget About the World" Released: 10 June 1996; 3. "If You Really Cared" Released: 23 September 1996; 4. "If You Ever" Released: 21 October 1996; 5. "Walk On By" Released: 20 January 1997

Professional ratings
Review scores
Source	Rating
AllMusic	link
Melody Maker	(favorable)

Gabrielle is the second studio album by the English R&B artist Gabrielle. It was released in 1996 and reached number 11 in the UK Albums Chart. The album was certified Platinum in the UK.

== Track listing ==
Gabrielle – Standard edition
No.	Title	Writer(s)	Producer(s)	Length
1.	"Forget About the World"	Gabrielle; Ben Barson; Andy Dean; Ben Wolff	The Boilerhouse Boys	4:15
2.	"People May Come"	Gabrielle; Barson; Dean; Wolff	The Boilerhouse Boys	4:29
3.	"I Live in Hope"	Gabrielle; Barson; Dean; Wolff	The Boilerhouse Boys	4:08
4.	"Baby I've Changed"	Gabrielle; Ashley Beedle; Marc Woolford	The Boilerhouse Boys; Beedle; Woolford	4:40
5.	"Give Me a Little More Time"	Gabrielle; Barson; Dean; Wolff	The Boilerhouse Boys	4:54
6.	"If You Really Cared"	Gabrielle; Barson; Dean; Wolff	The Boilerhouse Boys	4:51
7.	"There She Goes"	Gabrielle; Barson; Dean; Wolff	The Boilerhouse Boys	4:00
8.	"Our Love is Over"	Gabrielle; Barson; Dean; Wolff	The Boilerhouse Boys	5:13
9.	"If I Could"	Gabrielle; Denzil Foster; Thomas McElroy	Foster & McElroy	4:44
10.	"Alone"	Gabrielle; Barson; Dean; Wolff	The Boilerhouse Boys	3:09
11.	"Have You Ever Wondered"	Gabrielle; Barson; Dean; Wolff	The Boilerhouse Boys	3:57
12.	"So Glad"	Gabrielle; Barson; Dean; Wolff	The Boilerhouse Boys	4:05
13.	"Miracle"	Gabrielle; Foster; McElroy	Foster & McElroy	4:41

Gabrielle – UK bonus tracks
No.	Title	Writer(s)	Producer(s)	Length
14.	"If You Ever" (with East 17)	Carl Martin	Mike Rose; Nicholas Foster	4:17
15.	"Walk On By"	Burt Bacharach; Hal David	The Boilerhouse Boys	3:21
16.	"Forget About The World" (Remix by Trevor Horn)	Gabrielle; Barson; Dean; Wolff	The Boilerhouse Boys	4:22

Gabrielle – Japan bonus tracks
No.	Title	Writer(s)	Producer(s)	Length
14.	"Something To Talk About"	Gabrielle; Barson; Dean; Wolff	The Boilerhouse Boys	4:13

== Personnel ==
- Gabrielle – lead vocals
- Ben Barson – acoustic guitar, bass, Fender Rhodes, piano
- Matt Coldrick – guitar
- Geoff Dugmore – drums
- Luís Jardim – percussion
- Andy Caine, Tracy Ackerman – backing vocals
- The London Session Orchestra – strings
- Gavyn Wright – string conductor
- Nick Ingman – string arrangements
- Jamie Talbot, John Barclay, Pete Beachill, Phil Todd, Steve Sidwell – brass

Technical

- Christopher Marc Potter – recording, mixing
- Glen Luchford – cover photography

== Charts ==
=== Weekly charts ===
Weekly chart performance for Gabrielle
Chart (1996)	Peak position
Australian Albums (ARIA)	138
Dutch Albums (Album Top 100)	80
Scottish Albums (OCC)	16
UK Albums (OCC)	11
UK R&B Albums (OCC)	2

=== Year-end charts ===
Year-end chart performance for Gabrielle
Chart (1996)	Position
UK Albums (OCC)	51

== Certifications ==
Certifications of Gabrielle, with sales where available
Region	Certification	Certified units/sales
United Kingdom (BPI)	Platinum	300,000^{^}
^{^} Shipments figures based on certification alone.
