= Find Your Way =

Studio album by Gabrielle
- Released: 18 October 1993
- Length: 48:41
- Labels: Go! Beat; PolyGram
- Producers: Boilerhouse; Andy Cox; John Douglas; Richard Fermie; Paul & Steve Jervier; Tim Laws; David Steele; Jonathan Wales

Gabrielle chronology
Find Your Way (1993)	Gabrielle (1996)

Singles from Find Your Way
- 1. "Dreams" Released: 7 June 1993; 2. "Going Nowhere" Released: 20 September 1993; 3. "I Wish" Released: 29 November 1993; 4. "Because of You" Released: 14 February 1994

Professional ratings
Review scores
Source	Rating
AllMusic	3/5 stars
Music Week	4/5 stars
Select	2/5 medals
Smash Hits	3/5 stars

Find Your Way is the debut album by English R&B singer Gabrielle. It was released in 1993 and features her UK number one single, "Dreams", along with three further UK top 40 singles; "Going Nowhere", I Wish" and "Because of You". The album reached number nine on the UK Albums Chart.

== Track listing ==
Find Your Way – US Edition
No.	Title	Writer(s)	Producer (s)	Length
1.	"Going Nowhere"	Gabrielle; George McFarlane	Jonathan Wales; Paul Jervier; Steve Jervier	3:49
2.	"Who Could Love You More"	Gabrielle; Winston Sela	Andy Cox; David Steele	3:54
3.	"Find Your Way"	Gabrielle; Jon Douglas	Douglas	4:42
4.	"I Wanna Know"	Gabrielle; Ben Wolff; Andy Dean; Ben Barson	The Boilerhouse Boys	4:28
5.	"Dreams"	Gabrielle; Tim Laws	Richie Fermie	3:45
6.	"I Wish"	Gabrielle; Douglas	Douglas	4:48
7.	"We Don't Talk"	Gabrielle; Douglas	Douglas	4:34
8.	"Second Chance"	Gabrielle; Cox; Steele	Cox; Steele	3:24
9.	"Say What You Gotta Say"	Gabrielle; Wolff; Dean; Barson	The Boilerhouse Boys	3:43
10.	"Because of You"	Gabrielle; McFarlane	McFarlane	3:46

Find Your Way – UK Edition
No.	Title	Writer(s)	Producer (s)	Length
11.	"Inside Your Head"	Gabrielle; Laws	Laws	7:46

Find Your Way – Japan bonus track(s)
No.	Title	Writer(s)	Producer (s)	Length
11.	"Inside Your Head"	Gabrielle; Laws	Laws	5:47
12.	"Dreams" (Our Tribe House Mix)	Gabrielle; Laws	Fermie	6:44
13.	"Going Nowhere" (It's In The Post [Again] Mix)	Gabrielle; McFarlane	Wales; Jervier; Jervier	4:40

== Charts ==
=== Weekly charts ===
Weekly chart performance for Find Your Way
Chart (1993–94)	Peak position
Dutch Albums (Album Top 100)	87
German Albums (Offizielle Top 100)	72
Scottish Albums (Official Charts)	43
Swedish Albums (Sverigetopplistan)	56
UK Albums (Official Charts)	9

=== Year-end charts ===
Year-end chart performance for Find Your Way
Chart (1993)	Position
UK Albums (OCC)	97

== Certifications ==
Certifications of Find Your Way, with sales where available
Region	Certification	Certified units/sales
United Kingdom (BPI)	Gold	100,000^{^}
^{^} Shipments figures based on certification alone.
