= Why (Gabrielle song) =

Single by Gabrielle

from the album Always
- Released: 17 September 2007
- Recorded: 2007
- Length: 3:13
- Label: Go Beat; Universal
- Songwriter(s): Gabrielle; Paul Weller; Ben Wolff; Andy Dean
- Producer(s): The Boilerhouse Boys

Gabrielle singles chronology
"You Used to Love Me" (2004)	"Why" (2007)	"Every Little Teardrop" (2007)

Paul Weller singles chronology
"Are You Trying to Be Lonely?" (2007)	"Why" (2007)	"Echoes Round the Sun"/"Have You Made Up Your Mind" (2008)

"Why" is a song by English singer Gabrielle. It was written by Gabrielle, longtime collaborators Ben Wolff and Andy Dean, and Paul Weller for her fifth studio album, Always (2007). The song was one of the final songs recorded for the album and written around a sample of Weller's 1993 song "Wild Wood". Weller enjoyed Gabrielle's interpretation of the song so much, he recorded new vocals for the track following Gabrielle's recording of the original demo version of "Why". It also features David Cracknell, then political editor of The Sunday Times, on piano. Selected as the album's lead single, "Why" was released on 17 September 2007 as a digital download and one week later, on 24 September 2007, as a physical CD single. It charted at number 42 on the UK Singles Chart, her second consecutive single to miss the top 40.

== Music video ==
The music video for "Why" premiered on UK music channels on 31 August 2007. It features footage of Gabrielle and Weller in a recording studio producing and recording the song.

== Track listings ==
UK CD
No.	Title	Length
1.	"Why"	3:13
2.	"Nothing Hurts Like Goodbye"	4:33

== Charts ==
Chart (2007)	Peak position
UK Singles (OCC)	42
