= Going Nowhere =

1993 single by Gabrielle

Single by Gabrielle

from the album Find Your Way
- Released: 20 September 1993
- Genre: Soul
- Length: 3:50
- Label: Go! Beat
- Songwriters: Gabrielle; George McFarlane
- Producer: Peter Craigie

Gabrielle singles chronology
"Dreams" (1993)	"Going Nowhere" (1993)	"I Wish" (1993)

Music video
- "Going Nowhere" on YouTube

"Going Nowhere" is a song by English singer-songwriter Gabrielle. Written by Gabrielle and George McFarlane, and produced by Pete Cragie, the track appears on her debut studio album, Find Your Way (1993). Released as the album's second single on 20 September 1993 by Go! Beat, the song reached number nine on the UK Singles Chart and number 18 on the Irish Singles Chart. It also peaked at number three on the Canadian RPM Dance chart and at number 14 on the US Billboard Dance Club Play chart.

== Critical reception ==
In his weekly UK chart commentary, James Masterton wrote, "The girl and her eyepatch followup the summer's big No.1 'Dreams' with a track slightly more representative of her usual output and without the novelty value maybe not quite as big a hit." Editor Push from Melody Maker said, "Not a patch on 'Dreams'." Andy Beevers from Music Week gave the song a score of four out of five and named it Pick of the Week in the category of Dance, adding, "How do you follow up a debut hit as massive as 'Dreams'? Gabrielle wisely decides to stick to pretty much the same formula, delivering a distinctively sung, dead catchy song". He also noted, "However, this is no note-for-note rerun – the song is less overtly poppy than 'Dreams' and Steve Jervier's production gives it a street soul edge."

Tim Jeffery from the Record Mirror Dance Update described "Going Nowhere" as "a slow, soulful song aimed at the radio", and "not as innovative as 'Dreams' but sure to be another hit." Tom Doyle from Smash Hits gave it two out of five, saying that "it's not nearly as catchy" as her first single.

== Track listings ==
UK CD single
No.	Title	Length
1.	"Going Nowhere" (7-inch mix)	3:50
2.	"Going Nowhere" (It's in the Post (Again) mix)	4:39
3.	"Going Nowhere" (Assault on Battery mix)	4:32
4.	"Going Nowhere" (Law's House mix)	5:45
5.	"Going Nowhere" (Portishead mix)	5:01
6.	"Going Nowhere" (Red Underground (Again) mix)	5:16

UK 7-inch and cassette single, European CD single
No.	Title	Length
1.	"Going Nowhere" (7-inch mix)	3:50
2.	"Going Nowhere" (Portishead mix)	5:01

UK 12-inch single
No.	Title	Length
1.	"Going Nowhere" (Red Underground (Again) mix)	5:16
2.	"Going Nowhere" (It's in the Post (Again) mix)	4:39
3.	"Going Nowhere" (Developed Arrested (Again) mix)	5:19
4.	"Going Nowhere" (Law's House mix)	5:45
5.	"Going Nowhere" (Portishead mix)	5:01
6.	"Going Nowhere" (7-inch mix)	3:50

Australian CD single
No.	Title	Length
1.	"Going Nowhere" (7-inch mix)	3:50
2.	"Going Nowhere" (Law's House mix)	5:45
3.	"Going Nowhere" (It's in the Post (Again) mix)	4:39
4.	"Going Nowhere" (Portishead mix)	5:01

== Charts ==
Chart (1993–1994)	Peak position
Australia (ARIA)	77
Belgium (Ultratop 50 Flanders)	37
Canada Dance/Urban (RPM)	3
Europe (Eurochart Hot 100)	36
Europe (European Hit Radio)	12
Germany (GfK)	57
Iceland (Íslenski Listinn Topp 40)	15
Ireland (IRMA)	18
Israel (Israeli Singles Chart)	18
Netherlands (Dutch Top 40)	32
Netherlands (Single Top 100)	38
Switzerland (Schweizer Hitparade)	22
UK Singles (Official Charts)	9
UK Airplay (Music Week)	2
UK Dance (Music Week)	4
UK Club Chart (Music Week)	4
US Dance Club Songs (Billboard)	14
