= Always (Gabrielle album) =

Studio album by Gabrielle
- Released: 1 October 2007
- Length: 45:50
- Labels: Systemtactic; Go Beat; Universal
- Producers: Julian Gallagher; The Boilerhouse Boys

Gabrielle chronology
Play to Win (2004)	Always (2007)	Now and Always: 20 Years of Dreaming (2013)

Singles from Always
- 1. "Why" Released: 24 September 2007; 2. "Every Little Teardrop" Released: 3 December 2007

Always is the fifth studio album by English singer Gabrielle. It was released by Systemtactic Limited and Go! Beat Records on 1 October 2007 through Universal Music. Her first release in over three years, Gabrielle reteamed with longtime collaborators Julian Gallagher and The Boilerhouse Boys to work on the album. Always received positive reviews from music critics and entered the UK Albums Chart at number 11 and the UK R&B Album Chart at number 4. A supporting tour took place in February 2008.

== Critical reception ==
Professional ratings
Review scores
Source	Rating
AllMusic	3.5/5 stars
Digital Spy	4/5 stars

Nick Levine of Digital Spy praised Always as "the most innately Gabrielle record of her career," highlighting its emotional songwriting, warmth, and polished soul-pop production. While noting some lyrical limitations and weaker moments, he described the album as a classy return that demonstrated Gabrielle's strength in delivering "heartbreak in a dignified, unostentatious manner." BBC Music reviewer Ben Wood described Always as a departure from Gabrielle's previous "middle of the road" soul-pop, praising its "more eclectic, better-produced, funkier set of songs" and early 1970s soul influences. While noting that the lyrics could be a weakness, he concluded that the album was "a very pleasant surprise," highlighting its unexpected production choices and Gabrielle's distinctive vocal style.

AllMusic editor Jon O'Brien praised Always as a successful return to Gabrielle's retro soul-pop sound, describing it as featuring "some of the most inventive material of her 15-year career" and commending its "effortless blend of authentic soul and classy understated production." While he criticized the album's midsection for descending into "MOR territory" with "bland guitar ballads," he concluded that it showed Gabrielle "grow[ing] older gracefully, and on her own terms." Hot Press criticized Always for its repetitive lyrical themes and "equally stilted sound," arguing that Gabrielle's "charming voice" was "mostly mired in the unmemorable." The website's editorial team praised "Love Me Like You Do", "Closure", and "Why" as highlights, but concluded the album lacked strong songs comparable to "Rise" and "Dreams."

== Commercial performance ==
Always opened and peaked at number 11 on the UK Albums Chart and number 4 on the UK R&B Albums Chart, while also reaching number 27 in Scotland and number 79 in Ireland. It was Gabrielle's first studio album not to receive a UK certification and did not chart in several international territories where her earlier releases had previously charted, reflecting a more limited commercial impact compared to her prior work.

== Track listing ==
Always track listing
No.	Title	Writer(s)	Producer(s)	Length
1.	"Always"	Gabrielle; Julian Gallagher	Gallagher	4:15
2.	"Heartbreaker"	Gabrielle; Barson; Dean; Wolff	The Boilerhouse Boys	3:04
3.	"Why"	Gabrielle; Barson; Dean; Wolff	The Boilerhouse Boys	3:13
4.	"I Remember"	Gabrielle; Gallagher; Tom Brock; Robert Relf	Gallagher	3:03
5.	"Every Little Teardrop"	Gabrielle; Gallagher	Gallagher	3:25
6.	"I'm Not in Love"	Gabrielle; Gallagher	Gallagher	4:01
7.	"Love Me Like You Do"	Gabrielle; Barson; Dean; Wolff	The Boilerhouse Boys	3:22
8.	"Wiser"	Gabrielle; Gallagher	Gallagher	4:01
9.	"All I Want"	Gabrielle; Gallagher	Gallagher	3:46
10.	"It's Breaking My Heart"	Gabrielle; Gallagher	Gallagher	3:27
11.	"Cold Sober Moment"	Gabrielle; Gallagher	Gallagher	3:21
12.	"Show Me Love"	Gabrielle; Gallagher	Gallagher	3:15
13.	"Closure"	Gabrielle; Gallagher	Gallagher	3:46
Total length:				45:50

== Personnel ==
Adapted from AllMusic.

- Juan Alaya – guitar
- Mat Bartram – assistant engineer
- Mark Berrow – violin
- Rachel Bolt – viola
- Tom Brock – composer
- Gustav Clarkson – viola
- David "Crackers" Cracknell – piano
- Caroline Dale – cello
- David Daniels – cello
- Andy Dean – bass, composer, producer
- Liz Edwards Violin
- Gabrielle – composer, primary artist
- Dillon Gallagher – engineer
- Julian Gallagher – composer, drums, producer
- Simon Hale – piano, string arrangements, strings
- Ash Howes – mixing
- Richard Hynd – composer, keyboards, programming
- Garfield Jackson – viola
- Anders Kallmark – keyboards, mixing, programming
- Patrick Kiernan – violin
- Boguslaw Kostecki – violin
- Peter Lale – viola
- Chris Laurence – double bass
- Julian Leaper – violin
- William Lockhart – percussion, timpani
- Martin Loveday – cello
- Rita Manning – violin
- Christian Marsac – guitar, saxophone
- Perry Mason – leader, violin
- David McAlmont – background vocals
- Ally McErlaine – guitar
- Steve Morris – violin
- Everton Nelson – violin
- Tom Pigott-Smith – violin
- Chris Pitsillides – viola
- Chris Potter – engineer, mixing
- Steve Price – engineer
- Carmen Reece – background vocals
- Johnathan Rees – violin
- Robert Nelson Relf – composer
- Frank Ricotti – percussion
- Root – art direction, design
- Jackie Shave – violin
- Matthew Shave – photography
- Emlyn Singleton – violin
- Derrick Taylor – bass, violin
- Cathy Thompson – violin
- Christopher Tombling – violin
- Helen Tunstall – harp
- Lawrence Watson – photography
- Paul Weller – guitar, background vocals
- Bruce White – viola
- Ben Wiesner – drums
- Jonathan Williams – cello
- Ben Wolff – composer, drums, producer
- David Woodcock – violin
- Gavyn Wright – orchestra leader, violin
- Warren Zielinski – violin

== Charts ==
Weekly chart performance for Always
Chart (2007)	Peak position
Irish Albums (IRMA)	79
Scottish Albums (Official Charts)	27
UK Albums (Official Charts)	11
UK R&B Albums (Official Charts)	4
