= Dreams (Gabrielle song) =

1993 single by Gabrielle

Single by Gabrielle

from the album Find Your Way
- Released: 7 June 1993
- Genre: British soul; R&B; dance-pop; swingbeat
- Length: 3:44
- Label: Go! Beat
- Songwriters: Gabrielle; Tim Laws
- Producer: Richie Fermie

Gabrielle singles chronology
| "Dreams" (1993) | "Going Nowhere" (1993) |

Music video
- "Dreams" on YouTube

"Dreams" is a song by British singer and songwriter Gabrielle. It was written by Gabrielle and Tim Laws and produced by Richie Fermie for her debut studio album, Find Your Way (1993). Released by Go! Beat Records as Gabrielle's debut single, "Dreams" entered the UK Singles Chart at number two, which was the highest chart entry a debut act had obtained in the United Kingdom at that time before reaching number one for three weeks in June 1993. In the United States, the song peaked at numbers 26 and 27 on the Billboard Hot 100 and Cash Box Top 100, respectively, becoming Gabrielle's highest-charting song there. The song's accompanying music video was directed by Kate Garner.

"Dreams" is widely seen as Gabrielle's signature song, and its lyrics inspired the title of her greatest hits compilation Dreams Can Come True, Greatest Hits Vol. 1 (2001). The song is featured heavily in the 1999 Paul Thomas Anderson film Magnolia, where William H. Macy's downtrodden character Donnie Smith plays the song repeatedly as a motivational aid. In 2013, Gabrielle re-recorded the track with producer Naughty Boy for her compilation album Now and Always: 20 Years of Dreaming.

== Background and release ==
"I don't think Gabs had been in a studio before and I'm pretty sure Dreams was only her second ever recorded vocal, after the duet she did earlier with the other girl. I didn't have a vast amount of experience with singers then, but Gabs was awesome. She sang Dreams twice. I took the best bits and that was that. She didn't need fancy production techniques. She had the voice."

— Producer Tim Laws talking to The Guardian about the song.

Gabrielle used to perform at a London club called Moonlighting. One night after she'd performed Luther Vandross covers at the club, a woman told her, "This is as good as it's going to get for you." Disheartened by this, the singer went home and wrote the first lines of "Dreams" in her diary. Shortly after, Gabrielle and another singer, Jackie King from the club, got an opportunity to make a record in a studio in Byfleet, Surrey. Her boyfriend had paid for them to do it. Producer Tim Laws was impressed by her voice and asked if she could come back later on her own. The singer then performed the lyrics of "Dreams" over Laws' music which was a backing track, using a Korg M1 synthesiser for most of the parts – piano, bass, string line – with an Akai S900 firing off drum loops and hits.

The first version became a hit in nightclubs, being played by underground DJs. This version included a sample of the song "Fast Car" by Tracy Chapman, but because of copyright reasons, the sample had to be removed. After selling a few thousand copies, Gabrielle was signed to the Go! Beat label. Because the "Fast Car" sample had not been cleared, producer Richie Fermie recorded a new version of "Dreams", without the sample. This version went straight to number two on the UK Singles Chart as the highest charting debut single ever, before hitting number-one.

In a 1997 interview, Gabrielle said about making the song, "It wasn't until I took it home that I realised it was 'Fast Car' by Tracy Chapman and I thought, oh God, I love 'Fast Car,' but I don't think I could write anything original for it. And it wasn't until I had to go to the studio on the day, and I was on the train thinking, oh my God, I haven't written anything. So I opened up my notebook where, I keep my songs, and 'Dreams' was there, it was one of the songs I had written some time back."

== Critical reception ==
Larry Flick from Billboard magazine described the song as a "gloriously romantic, uplifting pop/dance shuffler" with a "wildly infectious chorus, delivered with a sly, feline grace." He commented further that a "interplay of contrasting elements like acoustic strumming, hip-hop-styled beats, and disco strings works surprisingly well". Tom Ewing of Freaky Trigger noted Gabrielle's voice as "soaked in personality" and complimented the production as "reassuringly professional, very close to the kind of powerpoint soul the Lighthouse Family would serve up later in the 90s." Dave Sholin from the Gavin Report felt the singer's "warm vocal style is just right to complement the hook-laden melody that she co-wrote." Irish Independent named it a "smooth debut pop single". Knight Ridder described it as "hypnotic". In his weekly UK chart commentary, James Masterton wrote that this is "another one of those records that is a hit almost before it even started." He also described it as a "haunting dreamy ballad" and "a unique record". Pan-European magazine Music & Media viewed it as "immaculate".

Alan Jones from Music Week said about the original 1992 release, "The soothing and gentle guitar intro to Tracy Chapman's 'Fast Car' underpins this superbly soulful dance cut, written and performed by a 22-year-old newcomer from Sydenham. Chiming synth strings and a Soul II Soul shuffle propel it along nicely, the uncluttered arrangement and production (by Unit 3) allowing her fine vocals room to breathe." He added, "Initially on a limited pressing of 1,500, which have now sold out, this is already getting specialist radio play, and could very easily explode as a major pop hit, given adequate distribution." Another Music Week editor, Andy Beevers, called the 1993 version "excellent". Mandi James from NME praised it, writing, "This is the sounds of blackness that will be drifting from sound systems nationwide by the end of summer. Swingbeat and soul, suckers, is back — and there's not a thing you can do about it." Marts Andrups from the Record Mirror Dance Update named it "a stunning debut with "summer hit" written all over it. Like a funky Tracy Chapman, there's a beautiful soul vocal over a deceptively simple acoustic guitar and string arrangement." Siân Pattenden from Smash Hits gave "Dreams" a score of four out of five, writing, "If you're a big girl and like soulful swishdance music, this'll be in your in-car CD player for 1,000 years. More or less. You've got to have dreams, she reckons, and it's true, children."

== Chart performance ==
In Europe, the song reached number one in the United Kingdom on 20 June 1993 and stayed there for three weeks. Before, it had entered the chart at number two. At that time, it was the highest chart entry a debut female solo act had scored in the UK. The single was a top-five hit in Ireland, Italy, Portugal and Sweden, as well as a top-10 hit in Austria, Belgium, Denmark, Finland, Iceland, the Netherlands and Switzerland. On the Eurochart Hot 100, "Dreams" reached its best position of number six on 14 August. It debuted on the chart at number 15 on 26 June, after charting in the UK and peaked eight weeks later. Outside Europe, the single peaked at number one on the US Billboard Dance Club Play chart and the Canadian RPM Dance/Urban chart. It also reached numbers 26 and 27 on the Billboard Hot 100 and Cash Box Top 100, becoming Gabrielle's highest-charting song in the US (and her only Top 40 hit in the US to date). In Australia, it peaked at number two on the ARIA Singles Chart. "Dreams" sold 513,000 copies in United Kingdom in 1993.

== Music video ==
The music video for "Dreams" was directed by British photographer, artist and singer Kate Garner. It received heavy rotation on MTV Europe in August 1993.

== Track listings ==
UK CD single
| No. | Title | Length |
|---|---|---|
| 1. | "Dreams" (7-inch version) | 3:44 |
| 2. | "Dreams" (The Developed Arrested mix) | 6:25 |
| 3. | "Dreams" (Our Tribe house mix) | 6:41 |
| 4. | "Dreams" (Dignity mix) | 5:44 |
| 5. | "Dreams" (Easy mix) | 5:39 |
| 6. | "Dreams" (Law's House) | 4:00 |
| 7. | "Dreams" (The Red Underground mix) | 6:16 |

UK 7-inch and cassette single; European CD single
| No. | Title | Length |
|---|---|---|
| 1. | "Dreams" | 3:44 |
| 2. | "Dreams" (Breakdown mix) | 3:54 |

UK and US 12-inch single
| No. | Title | Length |
|---|---|---|
| 1. | "Dreams" (The Developed Arrested mix) | 6:25 |
| 2. | "Dreams" (The Red Underground mix) | 6:16 |
| 3. | "Dreams" (Law's House) | 4:00 |
| 4. | "Dreams" (Our Tribe house mix) | 6:41 |
| 5. | "Dreams" (Dignity mix) | 5:44 |
| 6. | "Dreams" (7-inch version) | 3:44 |

US CD single
| No. | Title | Length |
|---|---|---|
| 1. | "Dreams" (7-inch version) | 3:44 |
| 2. | "Dreams" (Breakdown mix) | 3:53 |
| 3. | "Dreams" (acoustic version) | 3:51 |
| 4. | "Dreams" (Dignity mix edit) | 3:44 |
| 5. | "Dreams" (Easy mix edit) | 3:46 |

US cassette single
| No. | Title | Length |
|---|---|---|
| 1. | "Dreams" (7-inch version) | 3:41 |
| 2. | "Dreams" (Dignity mix) | 5:40 |

Australian CD single
| No. | Title | Length |
|---|---|---|
| 1. | "Dreams" (7-inch version) | 3:44 |
| 2. | "Dreams" (The Red Underground mix) | 6:16 |
| 3. | "Dreams" (Dignity mix) | 5:40 |
| 4. | "Dreams" (Our Tribe house mix) | 6:41 |

== Charts ==
=== Weekly charts ===
Weekly chart performance for "Dreams"
| Chart (1993–1994) | Peak position |
|---|---|
| Australia (ARIA) | 2 |
| Austria (Ö3 Austria Top 40) | 10 |
| Belgium (Ultratop 50 Flanders) | 6 |
| Canada Retail Singles (The Record) | 3 |
| Canada Top Singles (RPM) | 29 |
| Canada Dance/Urban (RPM) | 1 |
| Denmark (IFPI) | 8 |
| Europe (Eurochart Hot 100) | 6 |
| Europe (European Dance Radio) | 2 |
| Europe (European Hit Radio) | 2 |
| Finland (Suomen virallinen lista) | 9 |
| France (SNEP) | 11 |
| Germany (GfK) | 14 |
| Iceland (Íslenski Listinn Topp 40) | 10 |
| Ireland (IRMA) | 2 |
| Israel (Israeli Singles Chart) | 8 |
| Italy (Musica e dischi) | 4 |
| Netherlands (Dutch Top 40) | 6 |
| Netherlands (Single Top 100) | 7 |
| New Zealand (Recorded Music NZ) | 36 |
| Portugal (AFP) | 5 |
| Sweden (Sverigetopplistan) | 5 |
| Switzerland (Schweizer Hitparade) | 10 |
| UK Singles (Official Charts) | 1 |
| UK Airplay (Music Week) | 1 |
| UK Dance (Music Week) | 1 |
| UK Club Chart (Music Week) | 1 |
| US Billboard Hot 100 | 26 |
| US Dance Club Songs (Billboard) | 1 |
| US Dance Singles Sales (Billboard) | 7 |
| US Pop Airplay (Billboard) | 20 |
| US Rhythmic Airplay (Billboard) | 27 |
| US Cash Box Top 100 | 27 |

=== Year-end charts ===
1993 year-end chart performance for "Dreams"
| Chart (1993) | Position |
|---|---|
| Australia (ARIA) | 20 |
| Belgium (Ultratop) | 61 |
| Canada Dance/Urban (RPM) | 41 |
| Europe (Eurochart Hot 100) | 34 |
| Europe (European Hit Radio) | 10 |
| Germany (Media Control) | 68 |
| Iceland (Íslenski Listinn Topp 40) | 97 |
| Netherlands (Dutch Top 40) | 44 |
| Netherlands (Single Top 100) | 48 |
| Sweden (Topplistan) | 45 |
| UK Singles (OCC) | 5 |
| UK Airplay (Music Week) | 3 |
| UK Club Chart (Music Week) | 40 |
| US Dance Club Play (Billboard) | 45 |

1994 year-end chart performance for "Dreams"
| Chart (1994) | Position |
|---|---|
| Australia (ARIA) | 89 |
| Brazil (Crowley) | 92 |
| Canada Dance/Urban (RPM) | 5 |
| US Billboard Hot 100 | 75 |

== Certifications ==
Certifications and sales for "Dreams"
| Region | Certification | Certified units/sales |
|---|---|---|
| Australia (ARIA) | Platinum | 70,000^{^} |
| New Zealand (RMNZ) | Gold | 15,000^{‡} |
| United Kingdom (BPI) | Platinum | 1,000,000 |
^{^} Shipments figures based on certification alone.^{‡} Sales+streaming figures based on certification alone.

== Release history ==
Release dates and formats for "Dreams"
| Region | Date | Format(s) | Label(s) | Ref. |
|---|---|---|---|---|
| United Kingdom | 7 June 1993 | 7-inch vinyl; 12-inch vinyl; CD; cassette | Go! Beat | |
| Australia | 16 August 1993 | CD; cassette | Go! Beat; Polydor | |
| Japan | 25 October 1993 | Mini-CD | Go! Beat | |

== Other notable versions ==
- In 2017, UK producer Alex Ross released a cover, featuring vocals by Dakota and a rap verse from T-Pain. This version was certified silver by the BPI in 2023.
