= Gabrielle (singer) =

British singer (born 1969)

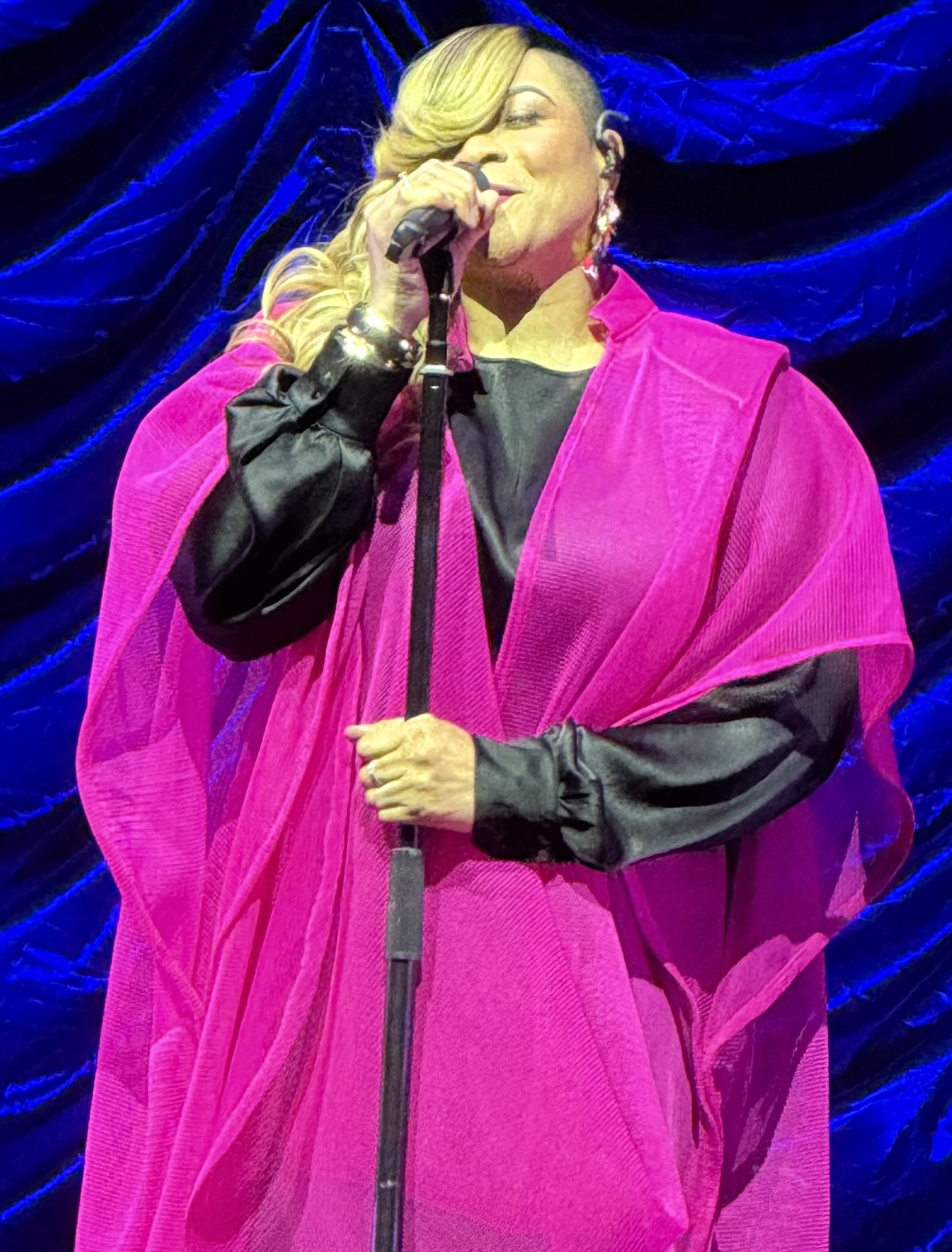
- Gabrielle in 2025

Background information
- Born: Louisa Gabriella Bobb; 19 July 1969 (age 57); Hackney, London, England
- Genres: R&B; pop; soul
- Occupation: Singer
- Years active: 1992–present
- Labels: Go Beat; Island; Universal
- Website: gabrielle.co.uk

Louisa Gabriella Bobb (born 19 July 1969), known professionally as Gabrielle, (Note: Gabrielle is the singer's stage name, derived from her middle name, "Gabriella") is a British singer and songwriter. Born in Hackney, London, she released her debut single, "Dreams", in 1993, and it topped the UK Singles Chart the same year. Her other singles include "Going Nowhere", "Give Me a Little More Time", "Walk On By", and "If You Ever" – a duet with East 17.

After a few inactive years, Gabrielle made a comeback with "Rise", which became her second UK number one, in 2000. Her album of the same name reached the top spot on the UK Albums Chart, where it stayed for three weeks. The song "Out of Reach", from the soundtrack to Bridget Jones's Diary, reached number four on the UK Singles Chart. She released the compilation Dreams Can Come True, Greatest Hits Vol. 1 in 2001.

== Early life ==
Gabrielle was born on 19 July 1969 in London, as Louisa Gabriella Bobb to parents from Dominica. She and her three brothers were brought up by their mother, Patricia. Gabrielle credited her mother for her love of soul and reggae music.

Gabrielle cited her high school teacher as one influence, saying that she was "inspired the moment her teacher asked her to construct her first poem. Her poetry began to develop into songs, and then she began to sing." Other inspirations came through in an eclectic collection of 1980s pop: Madonna, Culture Club, Haircut One Hundred, Duran Duran, Adam and the Ants and Wham!. "You know, it was all pop, and at the same time I was a huge Michael Jackson fan, so I had a big picture of him, you know, when he looked really beautiful, and he was dark chocolate and you just wanted to lick him, although they were innocent thoughts those days, when I was younger."

Gabrielle has had ptosis, the drooping of one eyelid, since childhood: in public, she covers her eye with sunglasses, an eyepatch, a hat or hair.

In school, Gabrielle suffered from depression and was sometimes suicidal. After finishing her A-levels, she abandoned an idea to study law and began singing in nightclubs.

== Career ==
=== 1993–1998: Find Your Way and Gabrielle ===
Gabrielle's real first name is Louisa, but she goes by a distorted version of her middle name, Gabriella. In an interview with Smooth Radio, she said: "I actually always thought I was Louise Gabrielle. But I’m actually Louisa Gabriella. 'Yes. Let’s call you Gabrielle. Let’s call you Gabrielle for now.' I was chuffed, because I didn’t have to make up a name. I was able to use my middle name. And that’s how it came about."

In June 1993, Gabrielle released her debut single, "Dreams", co-written by Gabrielle and Tim Laws and produced by Richie Fermie. In its earliest version, the song sampled the melody of Tracy Chapman's 1988 hit "Fast Car". This was later removed after copyright infringement. "Dreams" topped the UK Singles Chart for three weeks in June 1993, having entered the British charts at number 2, which was the highest chart entry a debut act had ever scored in the UK at that time. The song also peaked at number 26 on the Billboard Hot 100 chart in the US and at number-one on the Billboard Hot Dance Club Play chart. In Australia, the song made number two on the ARIA Chart. The second single "Going Nowhere" from the same album was written by Gabrielle and George McFarlane and produced by Pete Cragie. "Going Nowhere" reached number nine on the UK singles chart and number 18 ranking in Ireland. It was the second biggest hit from the album Find Your Way. In December 1993 Gabrielle released her third single from her debut album. "I Wish", written by Gabrielle and Jon Douglas, it was not as successful as its predecessors, which both reached the UK top ten. "I Wish" charted at number 26 on the UK singles chart. "Because of You" was the fourth and final single from Gabrielle's debut album Find Your Way. Written by Gabrielle, George McFarlane and Ray Saint John, "Because of You" peaked at number 24 on the UK Singles Chart. "Find Your Way" peaked at number nine on the UK Albums Chart.

Gabrielle released her self-titled second studio album in 1996, reaching number 11 in the UK Album Chart eventually going platinum. "Gabrielle" also reached number 80 on the MegaCharts in the Netherlands. The album's lead single "Give Me a Little More Time", returned Gabrielle to the UK top ten, peaking at five, spending ten weeks inside the UK top 20. The song also peaked at nine in Ireland. It is her fourth biggest selling single in the UK and has been certified silver. "Forget About the World" was released as the second single from the album. Written by Gabrielle, Wolff, Dean, Barson, who wrote previous single, "Give Me a Little More Time", "Forget About the World" did not perform as well as its predecessor, peaking at 23 in UK. It was the lowest charting single from the album and the only single to miss the top 15. The third single "If You Really Cared" was written by Gabrielle, Wolff, Dean, Barson, who wrote previous single, "Give Me a Little More Time" and "Forget About the World", "If You Really Cared" returned Gabrielle to the UK top 20 after the last single missed out. "If You Really Cared" peaked at 15 in the UK Singles Chart. Shai's "If I Ever Fall in Love" was covered in 1996 as a duet by East 17 and Gabrielle, and renamed "If You Ever". It reached number two in the UK and four in Latvia. It was also one of only three songs by Gabrielle to reach the top 20 in Australia, peaking at 16. It was the highest-charting single from both aforementioned albums. The song was also the 11th biggest selling boyband single of the 1990s in the UK selling 510,000 copies and has received a gold sales status certification. In 1997, UK singer Gabrielle released her version of "Walk On By" as the fifth and final single from her album. It reached number seven in the UK.

=== 1999–2001: Rise and Greatest Hits ===
Gabrielle began recording her third studio album Rise in 1998 through 1999. Rise was released on 18 October 1999 in the United Kingdom, and 15 August 2000 in the United States. The album became Gabrielle's biggest selling album to date with it becoming her only number one album. The album became a huge commercial success, spending three weeks at number one in the UK Albums Chart, and achieving 4× Platinum status. "Sunshine" was the album's first single and peaked at number nine in the UK giving her her sixth UK top ten hit. "Rise" was released as the album's second single. It was her second number one single in the UK (and thus far, last). Written by Gabrielle, Ollie Dagois, Ferdy Unger-Hamilton and Bob Dylan, and produced by Johnny Dollar, the song used a sample from Bob Dylan's "Knockin' on Heaven's Door". The song reached number one on the UK singles chart for two weeks in January 2000. The song has sold 460,000 copies in the UK as stated by the Official UK Charts Company making the song one of the 14th best selling of 2000 in the UK. The album of the same name also reached the top spot in the UK Albums Chart, where it stayed for three weeks. It spent 87 weeks in the charts. "When a Woman" was released as the third single from Rise in June 2000. The song reached number six on the UK Singles Chart and was the second-highest-charting single from the album. It became Gabrielle's eighth top ten hit. "Should I Stay" was released as a single in 2000 and was the fourth and final single released from the Rise album. The song charted at 13 in the UK Singles Chart, the fourth top 15 hit from the album. The video for the single is very moody and depicts the atmosphere of the song more so than having a linear storyline. In 2004, it was used in the second episode of the BBC drama serial Blackpool.

Gabrielle released her first greatest hits collection on 12 November 2001, entitled Dreams Can Come True, Greatest Hits Vol. 1. The album achieved success in the UK where it was certified as a four times platinum seller and became the fifth best selling album of 2001. It was also the 76th biggest selling album of that Decade in the UK. The lead single from the greatest hits album was "Out of Reach" which was also from the soundtrack to the film Bridget Jones's Diary. The song reached number four in the UK and nine in Australia, making it her second biggest hit in the country and also the 37th highest selling single of 2001. It remained on the chart there for more than 20 weeks. In New Zealand, the song was the tenth most successful single of 2001. The song has sold 320,000 copies in the UK as stated by the Official UK Charts Company. The second and final single from the album was "Don't Need the Sun to Shine (To Make Me Smile)". The single managed to peak at number nine in the UK Singles Chart, the song was also her eighth consecutive top 15 hit in the UK and her tenth top ten hit.

An arena tour of the United Kingdom followed in June 2002.

=== 2004–2008: Play to Win, Always and touring ===
Gabrielle once again teamed with frequent collaborators Jonathan Shorten and trio Julian Gallagher, Richard Stannard, and Ferdy Unger-Hamilton to work on her fourth studio album Play to Win. Released in May 2004, it reached number ten on the UK Albums Chart and was certified gold by the British Phonographic Industry (BPI). Elsewhere however, the album failed to chart noticeably. "Stay the Same," Play to Win's lead single, peaked at number 20 on the UK Singles Chart but became Gabrielle's lowest-charting single in eight years, albeit her tenth consecutive top twenty hit. Second and final single "Ten Years Time" missed the top 40. In support of the album, a UK concert tour followed.

In October 2007, Gabrielle's fifth studio album Always was released. While the album received positive reviews from music critics, its preceding single "Why," a duet with Paul Weller, failed to enter the top forty. Similarly, Always missed the top ten, peaking at number eleven on UK Albums Chart, and entered the UK R&B Album Chart at number 4. The final single from the album, "Every Little Teardrop" was released; however, it failed to chart. The same year, Gabrielle set off on a sell out UK tour of 14 dates which earned positive reviews on her performances. In mid-2008, she headlined the Zermatt Unplugged music festival along with Alanis Morissette, as well as the Birmingham Pride. In addition, Gabrielle won an Ivor Novello Award for Best Song Collection. and was also Al Green's special guest on the UK dates of his 2008 tour.

=== 2009–2012: Parenting career break ===
Gabrielle wanted to be closer to her two children, and so took a career break.

=== 2013–2020: Now and Always: 20 Years of Dreaming, and Under My Skin ===
Following a lengthy break, in November 2013, Gabrielle released the album Now and Always: 20 Years of Dreaming. Consisting of 34 tracks, including most of her singles, a number of album tracks, remixes from her remix album Rise Underground, and seven brand new tracks, the compilation was produced through Island Records to coincide with the release of her debut single, "Dreams", 20 years ago. The singer worked with several new collaborators on the new material on the album, including producers Naughty Boy and Syience as well as songwriter Emeli Sandé. In support of the album, a remix version of "Dreams" featuring Naughty Boy was released, while "Say Goodbye" served as the album's only single. A minor success, Now and Always: 20 Years of Dreaming peaked at number 38 on the UK Albums Chart. A headline UK tour promoting the album, entitled The 20 Years of Dreaming Tour, took place in March 2014.

Gabrielle released Under My Skin, her sixth studio album, worldwide on 17 August 2018. Her first studio album in 11 years, it marked her first album release through BMG Rights Management. The release of Under My Skin marked 25 years since the release of her debut single, "Dreams". Its release was preceded by lead single "Show Me".

=== 2021–present: Do It Again and A Place in Your Heart ===
In 2021, she participated in the second series of The Masked Singer as "Harlequin" and finished in fourth place. She then announced the release of her seventh studio album Do It Again for 5 March. Later that year Gabrielle appeared in Stormzy's music video for "Mel Made Me Do It".

Gabrielle's eighth studio album, A Place in Your Heart, was released in May 2024. Between March 2025, she embarked on "The Hits Live 2025" tour, which ran until the following month.

In 2026, she is due to support Rick Astley on his 'Reflection' tour

== Artistry ==
Gabrielle's first two studio albums were inspired by "classic soul connotations" such as Marvin Gaye, Barry White and Bobby Womack. However, the albums also contained influence "by early-'80s British pop" Soul II Soul, Lisa Stansfield and Mantronix. Gabrielle's third album Rise spoke of "optimism, romanticism, devotion, and a keen survival instinct". "Play to Win" incorporated a mix of genres. Gabrielle spoke about the album's influences saying "There's also a couple of songs which lean more to Country, so there will be a couple of surprises for them." She also talked about the genres on the album, saying, "There's nothing wrong with Country. Yeah, I'm a black woman, but I'd like to think that I can just sing 'songs'. This album is diverse but people buying my music can expect diverse music; it's about love, life and optimism."

== Personal life ==
Gabrielle has a son, born in 1995, and a daughter, born in 2003.

From 1992 to 1995, Gabrielle was in a relationship with Tony Antoniou, with whom she had her son. In 1995, Antoniou was arrested, and later convicted, for the murder of his stepfather; Antoniou killed Walter McCarthy, decapitated him and then dumped his body. Gabrielle was cleared of any involvement at all by police; in a 1999 interview, she shared, "When it first came out, there was no association with me,' she remembers. 'But once the press got wind of it and there was the major thing of me being questioned, my whole world just came in on me [...] It was made out that I went on the stand and said he didn't do it. I mean, the man confessed. But it was almost like I'd been (adopts whining voice) 'He couldn't possibly have done it".

Gabrielle developed obsessive–compulsive disorder after the murder; her condition worsened after she discovered Antoniou had stayed in her house while she was away and he was evading the police, and her refusal to drink outside of her home due to a fear of using the bathroom resulted in vocal cord nodules that temporarily rendered her unable to sing.

== Discography ==
=== Studio albums ===
- Find Your Way (1993)
- Gabrielle (1996)
- Rise (1999)
- Play to Win (2004)
- Always (2007)
- Under My Skin (2018)
- Do It Again (2021)
- A Place in Your Heart (2024)

=== Compilation albums ===
- Rise Underground (2000)
- Dreams Can Come True, Greatest Hits Vol. 1 (2001)
- Now and Always: 20 Years of Dreaming (2013)
- Dreams: The Best Of (2016)

== Awards ==
BRIT Awards

| Year | Nominee / work | Award | Result |
|---|---|---|---|
| 1994 | Herself | Best British Breakthrough | Won |
| 1994 | Herself | Best British Female | Nominated |
| 1997 | Herself | Best British Female | Won |
| 2000 | Herself | Best British Female | Nominated |

Black Music Awards

| Year | Nominee / work | Award | Result |
|---|---|---|---|
| 1994 | Herself | Best R&B Newcomer | Won |

Ivor Novello Awards

| Year | Nominee / work | Award | Result |
|---|---|---|---|
| 1994 | "Dreams" | Best Selling Song | Nominated |
| 1997 | "Give Me a Little More Time" | Most Performed Song | Nominated |
| 2000 | "Rise" | Best Contemporary Song | Nominated |
| 2001 | "Rise" | Most Performed Work | Nominated |
| 2002 | "Out of Reach" | Most Performed Work | Nominated |
| 2008 | Herself | Outstanding Song Collection | Won |

MOBO Awards

| Year | Nominee / work | Award | Result | Ref. |
|---|---|---|---|---|
| 1997 | "Give Me a Little More Time" | Best Single | Won | |
| 2000 | Rise | Best Album | Won | |
| 2000 | "Rise" | Best Single | Nominated | |
| 2000 | "Rise" | Best Video | Nominated | |

The Record of the Year

| Year | Nominee / work | Award | Result |
|---|---|---|---|
| 2000 | "Rise" | Record of the Year | Nominated |

Smash Hits Poll Winners Party

| Year | Nominee / work | Award | Result | Ref. |
|---|---|---|---|---|
| 1996 | Herself | Best Female Singer | Nominated | |
| 1996 | "If You Ever" | Best Single | Nominated | |

Urban Music Awards 2007 – Outstanding Achievement
